= National Dance Award (Spain) =

Artistic award in Spain

- Premio Nacional de Danza
- Awarded for: Creation and performance of dance works
- Sponsored by: Ministry of Culture and Sport
- Country: Spain
- Reward: €30,000
- First award: 1988
- Website: www.culturaydeporte.gob.es/cultura-mecd/areas-cultura/artesescenicas/premios/pn-danza/presentacion.html

The National Dance Award (Spanish: Premio Nacional de Danza) of Spain is an annual prize awarded by the Ministry of Culture since 1988 and regulated by the Royal Decree of 1995, along with the rest of the country's National Awards. It is granted by a jury and, since 2000, in two categories: Creation and Performance. Each confers a monetary prize of €30,000 (originally 2,000 pesetas).

== Recipients ==
- 1988: Antonio Gades
- 1989: Víctor Ullate
- 1990: Ana Laguna
- 1991: Cristina Hoyos
- 1992: Mario Maya
- 1993: Trinidad Sevillano
- 1994: Ramón Oller
- 1995: Antonio Canales
- 1996: Cesc Gelabert
- 1997: José Antonio Ruiz de la Cruz
- 1998: María Giménez
- 1999: José Carlos Martínez
- 2000: 10 & 10 Danza (Creation), María La Ribot (Performance)
- 2001: Manuel Segovia (Creation), Eva Yerbabuena (Performance)
- 2002: María Pagés (Creation), Ángel Corella (Performance)
- 2003: Nacho Duato (Creation), Sara Baras (Performance)
- 2004: Teresa Nieto (Creation), íida Gómez (Performance)
- 2005: Israel Galván (Creation), Lucía Lacarra (Performance)
- 2006: Ananda Dansa (Creation), Chevi Muraday (Performance)
- 2007: Carmen Werner Vallejo (Creation), Manuela Carrasco (Performance)
- 2008: Juan Carlos Santamaría (Creation), Javier Barón (Performance)
- 2009: Mal Pelo (Creation), Lola Greco (Performance)
- 2010: Àngels Margarit (Creation), Rocío Molina Cruz (Performance)
- 2011: Javier Latorre (Creation), Goyo Montero (Performance)
- 2012: Zenaida Yanowsky (Creation), Mónica Valenciano (Performance)
- 2013: Isabel Bayón (Creation), Marcos Morau (Performance)
- 2014: Daniel Abreu (Creation), Nazareth Panadero (Performance)
- 2015: La Intrusa (Creation), Rubén Olmo (Performance)
- 2016: Sol Picó (Creation), Joaquín De Luz (Performance)
- 2017: Kukai Dantza (Creation), Manuel Liñán (Performance)
- 2018: Antonio Ruz (Creation), Olga Pericet (Performance)
- 2019: Estévez/Paños y Compañía (Creation), Josefa Dácil González Ruiz (Performance)
- 2020: Jesús Carmona Moreno (Creation), Irache Ansa Santesteban (Performance)
- 2021: Sol León (Creation), Patricia Guerrero (Performance)
- 2022: Andrés Marín Pérez Vargas (Creation), Ana Francisca Morales Moreno (Performance)
- 2023 Rafaela Carrasco Rivero (Creation), Melania Olcina Yuguero (Performance)
- 2024 Luz Arcas (Creation), Lorena Nogal (Performance)
- 2025 Guillermo Weickert (Creation), Janet Novás (Performance)
