= Tablao Flamenco Cordobes =

The Tablao Flamenco Cordobes, founded in 1970 in Barcelona, is a venue dedicated to flamenco. Since then, it has promoted the dissemination and defence of 'arte jondo' in the tradition of singing cafés. Historical flamenco figures such as Camarón de la Isla, Farruco and Tomatito have performed there, as have contemporary artists including Jesús Carmona, Farruquito and Manuel Liñán. Since 1973, the Mezquita de Plata award has recognised artists, institutions and individuals who promote flamenco. The venue itself has also received various awards and has become an iconic space on Las Ramblas.

== History ==
It was founded in 1970 by the guitarist Luis P. Adame and his wife, the dancer Irene Casares García (stage name: Irene Alba).

Having trained in classical guitar and violin at the Madrid Conservatory, Luis Adame developed his professional career as a flamenco guitarist, performing in Seville and Madrid's tablaos. Together with Irene Alba, a classically trained dancer who also pursued a career as a flamenco dancer with the companies of José Greco and Marienma, he formed a company that began performing in Catalonia.

Following a performance in Salou, businessmen Andrés Durán and Joan Gaspart offered them a partnership to manage a new venue on Las Ramblas: the Tablao Flamenco El Cordobés. The venue had been created by Matías Colsada, a businessman from Paralelo, in honour of the bullfighter Manuel Benítez ‘El Cordobés’. Adame and Alba changed the name to 'Tablao Flamenco Cordobes' without an accent.

The opening show starred La Chunga, followed by other renowned artists: Camarón, Farruco, Chocolate, Manuela Carrasco, Antonio Gades, Fernanda and Bernarda de Utrera, and Miguel Poveda.

Juan de Dios Ramírez Heredia was a key supporter from the outset, broadcasting many of the shows live on his programme Crónica Flamenca on Radio Nacional de España.

In the 1980s, Mila de Vargas, the sister of Luis Adame and a dancer with the Spanish National Ballet, joined the tablao. Luis Adame's daughter, María Rosa Pérez, also joined the dance troupe during this period while studying law.

In the 1990s, the Adame family purchased the building from Matías Colsada and began renovating it, adding a restaurant. Eva la Yerbabuena and Israel Galván, among others, performed there. They had the support of the mayor at the time, Pasqual Maragall.

At the beginning of the 21st century, there was a generational change. María Rosa Pérez took over the management of Tablao Flamenco Cordobes, working alongside her brother Luis to adapt the family business to the digital age.

To celebrate its 40th anniversary in 2010, the Tablao Flamenco Cordobes Foundation was established.

In 2024, El Duende, a new venue also located on Las Ramblas and focused on new talent, was opened.

The following year, Tablao Flamenco Cordobes celebrated its 55^(th) anniversary with a special programme. The series of performances was inaugurated by Jesús Carmona and Benois de la Danse, who led the show Senderos Flamencos. This featured Alfonso Losa, José Maya, Águeda Saavedra, Juan Tomás de la Molía, Mercedes de Córdoba, Karime Amaya, Yoel Vargas, Juan de Juan, Paula Comitre, Belén López, Miguel Ángel Heredia, Adela Campallo and Ángel Reyes.

The 55^(th) anniversary saw the third generation of the family join the management team in the form of Curro Sánchez, son of María Rosa and a Law and International Trade graduate.

== The Mezquita de Plata Awards ==
The Mezquita de Plata is an award presented by Tablao Flamenco Cordobes to individuals or institutions that have made significant contributions to the promotion of flamenco. The first edition was held in 1973, when the award was presented to Joaquín Barraquer. Since the second edition in 1995, when Pasqual Maragall received the Mezquita de Plata, there have been a number of nominations and awards. These include FECAC (the Federation of Andalusian Cultural Entities in Catalonia) and Turismo Barcelona (in 2000); Cristina Hoyos (in 2011), who received the award from Joan Manuel Serrat. In 2015, Antonio Fernández Díaz 'Fosforito', Taller de Músics, Institut del Teatre and Juan de Dios Ramírez Heredia received the award. In 2017, it was presented to the Farruco and Galván families by La Chana. In 2025, the award went to Jesús Carmona and Manuela Carrasco.

== Acknowledgements ==
- Luis P. Adame, named ‘Concierge of Honour’ by the Asociación de la Llaves de Oro, which brings together tourism professionals from around the world (2013)
- Farruquito and his choreography, produced by Tablao Flamenco Cordobes, Critics' Award (2015)
- Highest score from the Club de Calidad del Flamenco (Flamenco Quality Club) (2017)
- Tripadvisor Travellers' Choice Award (2025)
- Twinning with the Peña ‘Perla de Cádiz’ (2025)
- ‘Best Tablao in the World’ at the tenth edition of the “Silverio Franconetti” International Flamenco Awards, organised by the Andalusian Flamenco School
