= Alicia Morales =

Spanish flamenco singer (born 1981)

- Born: Alicia Morales Sánchez
- Occupation: Singer

Alicia Morales Sánchez (La Zubia, Andalusia, 1981), known artistically as Alicia Morales, is a flamenco singer from Spain.

== Artistic career ==
Alicia Morales was born in La Zubia, Granada province, on August 14, 1981. Her first steps as a singer were linked to family parties and gatherings. During her adolescence, she began her artistic journey alongside her sisters before performing solo in the caves of Sacromonte, notably at La Zambra, La Rocío, and Venta del Gallo. During these years, she trained with masters such as Miguel Burgos 'el Cele', Antonio 'el Colorao', Curro Albayzín, Segundo Falcón, and Luis 'el Zambo'.

In 1995, at the age of 14, she released her first album, Herencia andalusí, sharing vocals with her sister Clara Morales. In 2011, she won the first prize in the Young Flamenco Singers Competition of the Granada Provincial Council. In 2013, she participated in the show De orilla a orilla alongside José Luis Ortiz Nuevo and Miguel Ochando. In 2014, she collaborated with Cristina Cruces in illustrating the conference Sound records of La Niña de los Peines. In 2018, she presented the project Entre primas at the Flamenco Festival in London with guitarist Antonia Jiménez and percussionist Nasrine Rahmani. That same year, she premiered the show Zorongo gitano at the Museum of the Sacromonte Caves in Granada. In 2016, she was recognized with the Miguel Hernández award for her career and dedication.

In 2019, she released her first solo album, La novia de cristal, an album dedicated to her homeland, Granada, where Morales stands out for her knowledge and vocal qualities. In 2020, she premiered the show Salitre alongside Paco Vidal, Paola Almodóvar, and Niño Ruven. In 2021, she performed Disobedient at the Federico García Lorca Cultural Center alongside pianist, Alfonso Aroca. Later that year, she appeared on the show Foro Flamenco on Canal Sur with Antonio Ortega and David de Arahal. In 2022, she participated in the Granada Music and Dance Festival —commemorating the 100th anniversary of the 1922 Cante Jondo Competition— alongside Naike Ponce, Sergio 'el Colorao' and Ismael 'el Bola'; and in the Poetry in the Laurel Festival featuring actor José Sacristán. In 2023, she was a guest artist in the show Musa mía by dancer Sara Jiménez, part of the MiraDas FlamenKas series at the Pilar Miró Cultural Center in Madrid. In 2024, she was one of the performers at the IV cycle of concerts Neguan Flamenco.

== Reception ==
- "The 'crystal bride' [...] is a 100% Granada work, both in its concept and in the development and the human group involved in it" (Diario de Sevilla).
- "Not only because the singer has a deep historical knowledge of Granada's flamenco heritage, but because she defends it with emotional dedication and musical creativity, typical of someone who already has a personal seal. It is 20th-century Granada flamenco from África Vázquez to Enrique Morente, interpreted with the sensitivity and voice of a 21st-century artist" (Claude Worms).
- "The singer's name was Alicia Morales. It was a voice straight out of Andalusia – different from the church-muscled American melisma, more feral and desperate, pressing beyond where you would think it could go, the voice climbing like a vine, creating new space for every branching figure." (Jeffrey Gray, PN Review)

== Discography ==
- 1995: Herencia andalusí
- 2019: La novia de cristal
