= René Robert (photographer) =

Swiss photographer (1936–2022)

- Born: 4 March 1936; Fribourg, Switzerland
- Died: 20 January 2022 (aged 85); Paris, France
- Occupation: Photographer

René Robert (4 March 1936 – 20 January 2022) was a Swiss photographer who specialized in photographing flamenco artists.

== Life and career ==
Born in 1936 in Fribourg, Robert discovered photography at the age of 12. He had a three-year apprenticeship in Lausanne before working for a press agency in Geneva. In the mid-1960s, he moved to Paris, where he met a Swedish dancer who introduced him to the flamenco. In 1967, he became one of the great portrait photographers. He photographed personalities such as Paco de Lucía, Israel Galván, and Rocío Molina Cruz in black-and-white.

== Death ==
On the evening of 19 January 2022, Robert was walking through the Place de la République in Paris when he suddenly had a heart attack and collapsed on the sidewalk on Rue de Turbigo. Despite Robert lying motionless and on the pavement for nine hours, no-one stopped to assist him or called for help, until eventually a homeless person called the emergency services. Robert died of hypothermia on 20 January 2022, at the age of 85.

His death was subsequently the subject of media debate around public indifference to street people.

== Personal life ==
He is survived by his daughter Dorothee Mazet, who lives in Serifontaine, France.

== Publications ==
- La rage & la grâce, les flamencos (2001)
- Flamenco attitudes (2003)

== Exhibitions ==
- "Un itinéraire en flamenco" (2015, Carré d'Art, Nîmes)
- Third Biennial of Flamenco Art (2017, Palais de Chaillot, Paris)
- "Chaillot, mémoire de la danse" (2018, Palais de Chaillot, Paris)
- "La caméra au rythme du flamenco" (2019, Espace Cosmopolis, Nantes).

== Public collections ==
- Bibliothèque nationale de France
