= Isabel Bayón Gamero =

Spanish Flamenco dancer

- Born: 13 May 1969 (age 56); Sevilla, Spain
- Occupation(s): Flamenco dancer, choreographer, teacher
- Career
- Dances: Flamenco
- Website: www.isabelbayon.es

Isabel Bayón Gamero (born 13 May 1969), known in flamenco dance circles as Isabel Bayón, is a flamenco dancer, choreographer and teacher of flamenco dance, winner of the Spanish National Dance Award in 2013 (Premio Nacional de Danza 2013) in the category of interpretation. Nowadays, she combines her artistic career and teaching in the María de Ávila Royal Dance Conservatory (Real Conservatorio de Danza María de Ávila) in Madrid.

She has taken part of in many flamenco festivals of dance and music not only in Spain, but also in many other countries.

== Biography and professional career ==
Isabel Bayón was born in Seville in 1969. She started her connection with dancing at the age of five in Matilde Coral Dance Academy. She continued her studies in this field until she graduated with a degree in Spanish dance (Danza Española) in the conservatories of Seville and Córdoba when she was 16 years old. Moreover, she also learned other dance styles, such as ballet, regional dance or contemporary dance.

== 1970s ==
In the '70s, she performed for the first time in her career. Her debut was in a tribute show to Antonio Ruiz Soler, El Bailarín, released by himself. In 1979, she took part as a guest artist in the Flamenco Dance Congress Tribute to Antonio Mairena (Congreso Flamenco Homenaje a Antonio Mairena). This Congress and its performances took place in the Reales Alcázares of Seville.

== 1980s ==
During the '80s, she was soloist flamenco dancer in the First Biennial of Flamenco in Seville (Bienal de Flamenco de Sevilla) with her show Flamenco Vivo. She had also started her tour with this show in Italy at the time, hand in hand with the artists Manolo Marín and Milagros Mengíbar. In 1984, she took part in Madrid Flamenco Summit (Cumbre Flamenca de Madrid), organized by the Spanish Ministry of Culture in the capital of Spain.

== 1990s ==
In 1990, she was accepted as a soloist flamenco dancer in Manolo Marín's Company, acting in the show called "A Contratiempo". Two years later, she joined as a soloist flamenco dancer to the show "Azabache", performed during the Universal Exposition of Seville in 1992. In 1994, she joined the Andalusian Dance Company (Compañía Andaluza de Danza), which is the Company directed by Mario Maya. With it, she was on tour around Europe and Spain during 1995 with the shows De lo Flamenco and Réquiem. In 1996, she was accepted in the Flamenco Company "Escena Flamenca" (Flamenco Scene), in which she performed the show "Picasso Flamenco", a tribute to the painter from Malaga. She was invited by the flamenco singer Miguel Poveda to join him in the Festival Grec in Barcelona, in 1997. She also took part as a guest artist in La huella de la Argentinita, led by José Luis Ortiz. She performed in El Flamenco viene del sur in collaboration with Israel Galván, a show released in Teatro Central of Seville in 1998. In 1999, she collaborated as a choreographer in two shows: The first one was "Oripandó" for the National Ballet of Spain (Ballet Nacional de España), led by Aida Gómez. The second one was a piece of the show "Encuentro" for the Andalusian Dance Company (Compañía Andaluza de Danza), in which she took part simultaneously as a guest artist in the show "Elegía Andaluza".

== 2000s to 2010 ==
In 2000 she took part as guest artist in the show Bachdaliana from Fernando Romero's Company for the 11th Biennial of Flamenco of Seville (XIª Bienal de Arte Flamenco de Sevilla). In the context of the 12th Biennial of Flamenco of Seville (XIIª Bienal de Arte Flamenco de Sevilla), in 2002, the dancer introduced her own flamenco dance company, named Isabel Bayón Compañía Flamenca. There, she also released her show Del Alma. Afterwards, she took that show to the Jerez Flamenco Festival (Festival de Jerez) and to the Torino Flamenco Festival (Festival de Turín), in Italy. In the 13th Biennial of Flamenco of Seville (XIIIª Bienal de Arte Flamenco de Sevilla) she starred and choreographed the show La Mujer y el Pelele, led by Pepa Gamboa. In 2005, she took part as a guest artist in the shows "Notas al Pié", from Javier Barón's Company, released in Jerez Flamenco Festival. In the same year, she participated in the show Y la Batita de Cola, released in the New World Flamenco Festival in San Francisco (USA). In 2006, within the 14th Biennial of Flamenco of Seville (XIVª Bienal de Arte Flamenco de Sevilla) she received a Giraldillo Award for the best show, called "La Puerta Abierta". In 2007 she set up the Flamenco Dance Academy ADOS (Escuela de Baile Flamenco ADOS) together with Ángel Atienza, who is the current Academy director. In the same year, she started to teach in the María de Ávila Royal Dance Conservatory (Real Conservatorio de Danza María de Ávila) in the Community of Madrid. In 2008 she was awarded again with another Giraldillo Award in the 15th Biennial of Flamenco of Seville (XVª Bienal de Arte Flamenco de Sevilla), this time in the Magical Moment Biennial (Momento Mágico Bienal 2008) in 2008, happened during her show La tórtola Valencia for the beginning and development of the last soleá, in special collaboration with Matilde Coral and Miguel Poveda. During ¡FLAMENCO! Dance Festival of Rome, in 2009, she gave a masterclass and performed in two shows: "Tan Solo Flamenco" and "La Puerta Abierta". She released in the Biennial of Flamenco of Seville (XIIIª Bienal de Arte Flamenco de Sevilla) her show En la horma de sus zapatos. This show made her be awarded again with the Giraldillo Award, this time for the dancing.

== 2011 to present ==
In February 2011 she received the special Award "Day of Andalusia" (Galardón del Día de Andalucía) for her professional career within the flamenco world. In 2012 she got involved in the show Lo Real/ Le réel/ The Real, choreographed by Israel Galván and released in the Royal Theatre of Madrid (Teatro Real de Madrid). This show was also performed in the 4th Dutch Flamenco Biennale of The Netherlands in 2013. There, Isabel also gave a masterclass. The flamenco dancer released in February of the same year a new show from her own company called "Caprichos del Tiempo". This show turned out to be awarded with the Critics Awards (Premio de la Crítica) of the 17th Flamenco Festival of Jerez. This award is given once a year by the Flamencology Journal, a journal made by the Chair of Flamencology, the study of flamenco music and dance, of Jerez. At the end of this year she received the Spanish National Dance Award (Premio Nacional de Danza) in the category of interpretation awarded by the Spanish Ministry of Education, Culture and Sport (Ministerio de Educación, Cultura y Deporte). This award is worth €30 000. In 2014 she received another two awards: the first one was from the Press Association of Sevilla (Asociación de la Prensa de Sevilla), that gave her the Clavel de la Prensa Award, an award that gives recognition to remarkable public figures of the city of Seville. The second one was the "Fuera de Serie" Award, from Expansión magazine, in the category of dance, with which they recognise the success of different professionals in their respective field in a national or international context within the year. In July 2015 she was a teacher in one of the summer courses organized by Pablo de Olavide University of Sevilla. The course was called "El compás del tiempo del baile flamenco: Historia, evolución y realidad". In 2016, in the Biennial of Flamenco of Seville (Bienal de Arte Flamenco de Sevilla), the flamenco dancer was directed by Israel Galván with whom she released the show Dju-Dju.

Nowadays, Isabel Bayón continues to teach in the Royal Dance Conservatory (Real Conservatorio de Danza in Madrid, as a professor of Flamenco Techniques, Flamenco Methods and Flamenco Teaching, Analysis and Practice of Flamenco Repertoire. However, she has not put her professional career aside. She has been invited to participate in the White Night of Flamenco in Cordoba (XI Noche Blanca del Flamenco de Córdoba) that will take place next June. There, she will perform in her show Lo esencial. Moreover, the flamenco dancer is involved in the creation of a new personal show that will be releasing in September, in the Biennial of Flamenco of Seville (Bienal de Arte Flamenco de Sevilla). This show is named "Yo Soy".

== Teaching ==
- Masterclass di Baile: ¡BAILE!, ¡FLAMENCO! Festival de Roma, September 2009.
- Masterclass in the 4th Dutch Flamenco Biennale in The Netherlands, 2013.
- Summer courses in Pablo de Olavide University, "El compás del tiempo del baile flamenco: Historia, evolución y realidad", July 2015.

Current professor of María de Ávila Royal Dance Conservatory (Real Conservatorio de Danza María de Ávila)

== Shows as a guest artist or in collaboration ==
- Flamenco Vivo, 1986.
- A Contratiempo, from Manolo Marín, 1990.
- Azabache, 1992.
- De los Flamencos, from Mario Maya, 1994–5.
- Requiem, from Mario Maya, 1994–5.
- Picasso Flamenco, "Escena Flamenca" Company, 1996.
- Festival del Grec in Barcelona, with Miguel Poveda, 1997.
- La huella de Argentinita, de Jose Luis Ortiz, 1997. Guest artist.
- El Flamenco viene del sur, Ciclo Flamenco 1998.
- Los gitanos cantan y bailan a Lorca, 1998.
- Solo por Arte, 1998. Guest artist.
- Elegía Andaluza, 1999. Guest artist.
- Oripandó, choreography for the National Ballet (Ballet Nacional de España), 1999.
- Encuentro, choreography for the Andalusian Dance Company as a guest artist, 1999.
- Bachdaliana, from Fernando Romero's Company, 2000. Guest artist.
- Notas al Pié, Javier Barón, 2005. Guest artist.
- Y la Batita de Cola, 2005.
- Lo real/Le réel/The Real, from Israel Galván, 2012.
- La que está cayendo, choreography, 2013.
- Dju-Dju, from Israel Galván, 2016.

== Personal shows ==
- Del alma, 2002.
- La mujer y el pelele, 2004.
- La puerta abierta, in collaboration with Miguel Poveda, 2006.
- La Tórtola Valencia, 2008.
- Tan Solo Flamenco, 2009.
- En la horma de sus zapatos, 2010
- Caprichos del Tiempo, 2013.
- Dju-Dju, directed by Israel Galván, 2016.
- Lo essential, 2017.
- Currently working in the show "Yo soy" for the 20th Biennial of Flamenco Dance of Sevilla, 2018.

== Honors and awards received ==
- Finalist of the Certamen Giraldillo del Baile, organized by the town council of Seville, 1988.
- Giraldillo Award for the best show in the 14th Biennial of Flamenco of Seville (XIVª Bienal de Arte Flamenco de Sevilla), 2006 – Show: La puerta Abierta, in collaboration with the guest artist Miguel Poveda and led by Pepa Gamboa.
- Giraldillo Award for the Magical Moment Biennial 2008 en the 15th Biennial of Flamenco of Seville (XVª Bienal de Arte Flamenco de Sevilla), 2008 – Show: La tórtola Valencia, for the beginning and development of the last soleá, in special collaboration with Matilde Coral and Miguel Poveda.
- Giraldillo Award for the dancing, 2010 – Show: "En la horma de su zapato».
- Critics Award (Premio de la Crítica) in the 17th Flamenco Festival of Jerez, March 2013 - Show: "Caprichos del tiempo".
- Spanish National Dance Award (Premio Nacional de Danza) in the category of interpretation awarded by the Spanish Ministry of Education, Culture and Sport (Ministerio de Educación, Cultura y Deporte), 2013.
- "Clavel de la Prensa" Award from the Press Association of Sevilla (Asociación de la Prensa de Sevilla), 2014.
- "Fuera de Serie" Award in Dance category from Expansión Magazine.
