= Belén Maya =

Spanish flamenco dancer, choreographer and educator

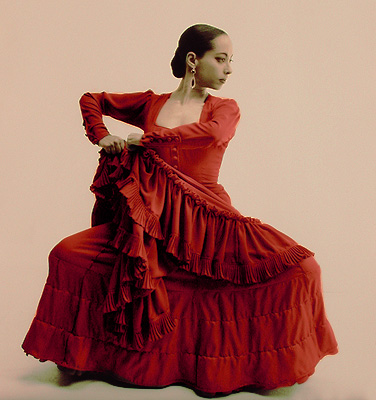
- Born: 1966 (age 59–60); New York City, United States
- Career
- Dances: flamenco

Belén Maya (born 1966) is a Spanish flamenco dancer, choreographer and educator.

== Biography ==
Belén Maya is the daughter of Mario Maya, a Romani flamenco dancer, and Carmen Mora, also a flamenco dancer. She was born in New York City while her parents were on tour performing. Maya began dancing while still young and studied classical, Hindu and contemporary dance in Italy, Germany and England. She also studied at the Amor de Dios school in Madrid with teachers including Goyo Montero. She joined the Spanish National Ballet, later joining her father's company. She then formed her own company, going on tour in Japan; she next joined the Andalusian Dance Company.

In 1995 she was chosen as one of the representatives of the new aesthetics of flamenco in Flamenco, a documentary by Carlos Saura. According to Saura, "it doesn't seem like flamenco," which is why he justified the choice to put her on the film's promotional poster.

In 1997, she formed a company with singer Mayte Martín which performed at major festivals in 2002 and 2003. She studied with Juan Carlos Lérida.

In 2014, her show Los Invitados received the Critic's Award at the Festival de Jerez. In 2015, she was chosen as the best dancer at the Premios Flamenco Hoy by the Crítica Nacional de Flamenco.

Maya recently stopped performing to focus on lectures on contemporary flamenco and gender issues, particularly in the United States.
