= José María Gallardo Del Rey =

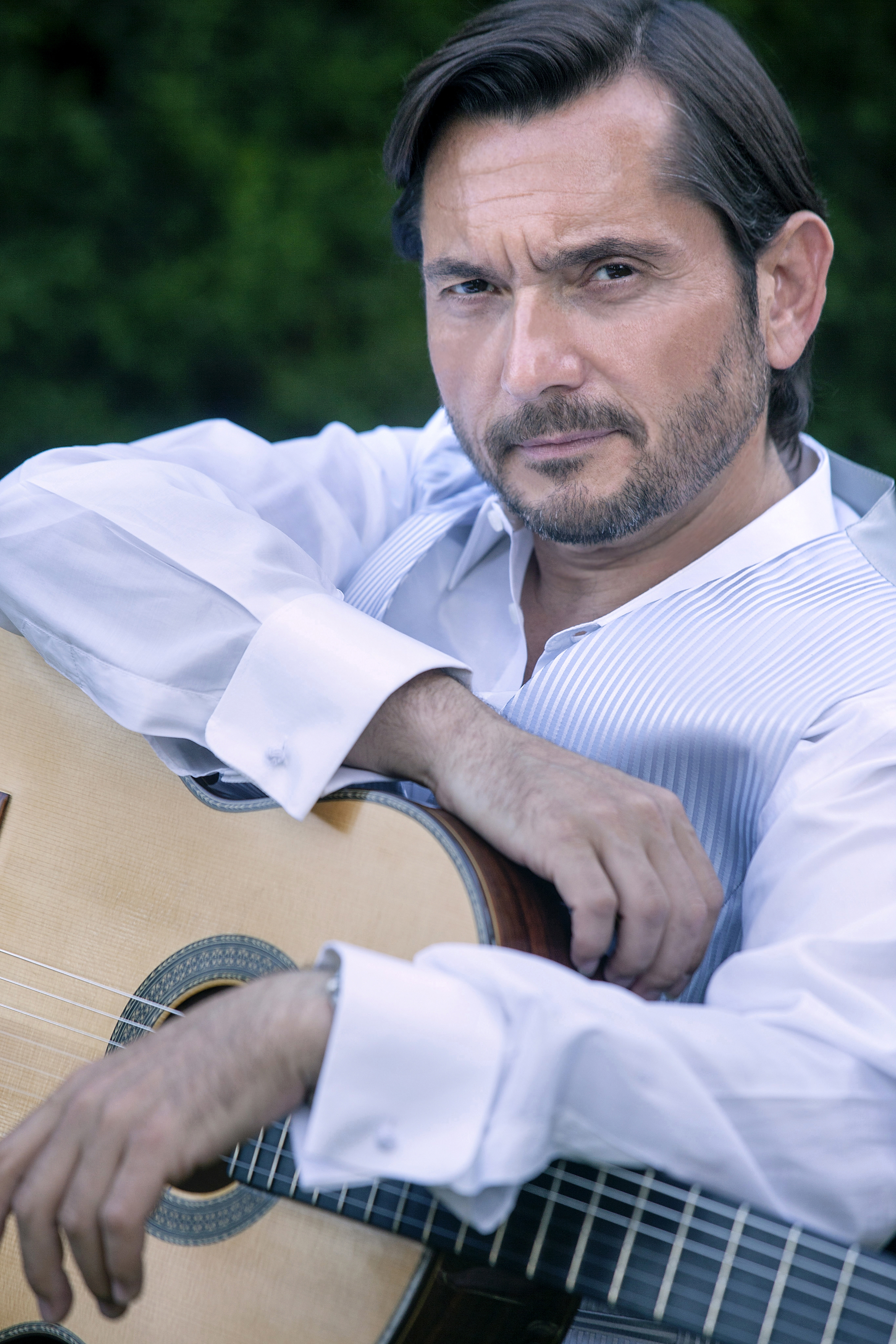

Background information
- Born: May 18, 1961 (age 64); Barcelona, Spain
- Origin: Seville, Spain
- Genres: Classical; flamenco; chamber; symphonic
- Occupations: Composer, guitarist, record producer, editor
- Years active: 1970–present
- Labels: Gallardo Del Rey Ediciones; Deutsche Grammophon
- Website: www.gallardodelrey.com

José María Gallardo del Rey (born 18 May 1961) is a Spanish musician, guitarist and composer. He has received international awards, both as a performer and for his compositions.

== Career ==
Born in Seville, Spain, Gallardo del Rey started his career at the age of nine. His training as a classical guitarist has been enriched by his intense relationship with the world of flamenco.

The combination of both styles has created a unique way to interpret and understand Spanish music, which contributed to projects like: his work as adviser to Paco de Lucía in his debut with the Concierto de Aranjuez (Japan 1990); Pasión Española with Plácido Domingo, which won the Latin Grammy Award in 2008; Habanera Gipsy (2010), with Elina Garança; and Caprichos Líricos with Teresa Berganza.

In 2003, Gallardo del Rey composed his Lorca Suite as a tribute to Federico García Lorca and based on the poet's folk song compilations Canciones Españolas Antiguas, for which he composed harmonisations and link passages that fuse classical and flamenco techniques. His composition Glosas, commissioned by SLO Symphony Artistic Director Michael Nowak, received its premiere in March 2011.

He has worked with Yehudi Menuhin, Jean-Pierre Rampal, Seiji Ozawa, John Williams (guitarist), Kaori Muraji, John Axelrod, Sir Neville Marriner, Philippe Entremont, Leo Brouwer, Michael Nowak, Karel Mark Chichon, Elton John, Ros Marbá, García Asensio, Josep Pons, and José Ramón Encinar.

Gallardo del Rey has recorded sixteen albums: as a soloist, with his chamber orchestra La Maestranza and in many collaborations. His music has been choreographed by dancers such as María Pagés, Víctor Ullate and Lola Greco.

== Discography ==
- Suite Sevilla (1993), JMS France – with Rafael Riqueni.
- Al Aire Español (1996).
- Concierto Romántico (1996), SLO, EEUU – with SLO Symphony, Michael Nowak (conductor).
- La Maestranza (1999), Mandala, France – with La Maestranza Chamber Group.
- The Trees Speak (2004), Deutsche Grammophon.
- Rodrigo Guitar Concertos (1999), Classic FM – with Orquesta Nacional de España, Rafael Frühbeck de Burgos (director).
- 14 Maneras De echarte De Menos (2006), Deutsche Grammophon – with Ezequiel Cortabarría (flute).
- Noches De San Lorenzo (2013), AE Ediciones.
- Pasión Española (2008), Deutsche Grammophon – with Orquesta de la Comunidad de Madrid, Miguel Roa (conductor), Plácido Domingo (tenor).
- Reyana (2010), AE Ediciones, Mexico – with Anabel García del Castillo (violin).
- Habanera – Canción Del Amor (2010), Deutsche Grammophon – with Elīna Garanča (mezzo-soprano), Alberto Barletta (flute), Enrico Maria Baroni (clarinet), Roberto Vozmediano (cajón), Geri Brown (viola), Massimo Macri (cello), Cesare Maghenzani (double bass).
- My Spain (2011), Deutsche Grammophon – with La Maestranza Chamber group.
- Glosas (2013), SLO 2013 EEUU – with SLO Symphony, Michael Nowak (conductor), Anabel García del Castillo (violin).
- Reyana plays Rossini/Carrulli (2014), Editorial Reyana – with Anabel García Del Castillo (violin).
- Diego de Araciel, obras de cámara para cuerdas (2014), SEM – with Cuarteto Canales.
- Lo Cortés No Quita Lo Gallardo (2015), Editorial Reyana – with Miguel Ángel Cortés (guitar).
- Sakura Variations (2016), Gallardo Del Rey Ediciones – with Ayaka Tanimoto (mezzo-soprano).
