= Lorena Nogal =

Spanish dancer and choreographer (born 1984)

- Born: 1984 (age 41–42); Barcelona, Spain
- Occupations: Dancer; choreographer

Lorena Nogal (born 1984) is a Spanish dancer and choreographer; a longtime member of La Veronal, she works with Marcos Morau as a performer and choreographic assistant and co-founded HOTEL Col·lectiu Escènic in 2018. She won Spain's 2024 National Dance Award in the performance category.

== Early life and training ==
Nogal was born in Barcelona in 1984 and began studying Spanish dance with Eulàlia Blasi, first wanting to dance sevillanas and later adding ballet and contemporary dance; at 12, she failed her first entrance examinations at the Institut del Teatre but passed a second attempt two months later. (Note: El Periódico gives 1984 as Nogal's birth year; RTVE gives 1985.) She graduated as a dancer from the Institut del Teatre in 2005 and also trained with the IT Dansa company.

== La Veronal ==
Nogal and Marcos Morau first competed against each other at the Certamen Coreográfico de Salt, where he won first prize and she placed second; a few months later they began rehearsing Suecia, the first piece in La Veronal's ten-part series based on countries. She became a dancer and choreographic assistant on the company's own productions and on works for the Royal Danish Ballet, Beijing Dance Theater, Gothenburg Opera Dance Company, the Spanish National Dance Company and Scapino Ballet Rotterdam; she also teaches Kova, a movement language developed with La Veronal. In April 2022, she was one of eight dancers in Pasionaria at London's Sadler's Wells, where a review identified her as Morau's choreographic assistant.

== HOTEL and other collaborations ==
Nogal helped start HOTEL Col·lectiu Escènic in 2018 with fellow Institut del Teatre graduates, a project built around collaborations with artists from other disciplines; she also collaborated with flamenco dancer Paula Comitre on Alegorías, el límite y sus mapas, presented at the Théâtre national de Chaillot in Paris in 2022. In 2025, HOTEL's Habitación 444: aquí, performed by Nogal with Robert Gómez, Anna Hierro, Èlia López and Álvaro Esteban, used organic materials and textures to examine the relationship between bodies and architecture.

== Solo choreography ==
Nogal made her solo debut with the short piece El elogio de la fisura in 2021 at Temporada Alta and Sismògraf Olot. In 2025, her solo PICASSa was produced by Graner and the Museu Picasso for the Grec Festival and performed at the museum. She premiered her first full-length solo, La protagonista, at Centro Danza Matadero in June 2026; the piece explores inherited memory and uses texts by Pol Guasch.

== Awards ==
Nogal was named best female dancer at the 2016 Premios de la Crítica de Cataluña for her performances in Marcos Morau's Vorònia and Zelenstova. She won best female dance performer at the 2024 Talía Awards for Firmamento, which also received the award for best dance show. In October 2024, she received the National Dance Award for performance, while Luz Arcas received the creation award; each prize carried €30,000.
