= Luz Arcas =

Spanish dancer, choreographer and stage director (born 1983)

- Born: María Luz Arcas López; 1983 (age 42–43); Málaga, Spain
- Occupations: Dancer; choreographer; stage director

María Luz Arcas López (born 1983), known as Luz Arcas, is a Spanish dancer, choreographer and stage director who founded the contemporary dance company La Phármaco in 2009. She received the El Ojo Crítico dance award in 2015 and Spain's National Dance Award for Creation in 2024, the latter after completing the trilogies Bekristen: Tríptico de la prosperidad and Ciclo de los milagros.

== Early life and training ==
Arcas was born in Málaga in 1983, studied choreography and performance at the Conservatorio Superior María de Ávila and stage direction at the Real Escuela Superior de Arte Dramático in Madrid, and trained in flamenco, classical Indian dance and contemporary dance in Brussels, Amsterdam and Berlin; she founded La Phármaco in 2009.

== Early career ==
In 2018 Arcas and Abraham Gragera created Una gran emoción política for the Centro Dramático Nacional, based on María Teresa León's autobiography Memoria de la melancolía; it premiered at Madrid's Teatro Valle-Inclán on 26 September with 13 dancers, actors and musicians.

== Mariana and Todas las santas ==
Arcas's book Pensé que bailar me salvaría was published in 2022, the year she premiered Mariana at the Seville Flamenco Biennial and Todas las santas at the Cádiz Ibero-American Theatre Festival. Based on the lives of Salvadoran performers Egly Larreynaga and Alicia Chong, Todas las santas was Arcas's first stage work to give text a central role and used their stories to ask who is sanctified and who deserves that status.

In Mariana, Arcas performs as the sole dancer alongside five musicians and uses female working animals in Andalusian culture to examine labour, dependency and violence; she described the physical language as cuerpo jondo, an internal and hybrid form developed without using a mirror. Writing for Tanz International, Arnd Wesemann described her work as drawing on regional dance traditions and transposing them into the present. In 2023 she directed Sarah Kane's 4.48 Psychosis at the Teatro Español, with Natalia Huarte as the sole performer in a staging centred on a bed, medication and a sink.

== Bekristen and Ciclo de los milagros ==
Arcas developed Bekristen: Tríptico de la prosperidad over five years through La domesticación (2019), Somos la guerra (2021) and La buena obra (2023), presenting the nearly three-hour trilogy at Teatros del Canal during the 41st Festival de Otoño. Its title means 'Christians' in Fang, and the final piece used eight performers aged between 60 and 80, many of them non-professionals, to address the abandonment of elderly people in care homes during the COVID-19 pandemic.

Arcas grouped Toná, Trilla and Mariana in Ciclo de los milagros and presented the three works together at Teatro de la Abadía in March 2025; Trilla, her collaboration with the musician Le Parody, combines folk and electronic music.

== Later work ==
Arcas presented La cosa y la fuerza with Rafael SM Paniagua, a response to Goya's print series The Disasters of War and Simone Weil's account of force in the Iliad. Tierras raras premiered at Teatros del Canal on 30 May 2025 during the Madrid en Danza festival, with Arcas dancing alongside La Merce, Danielle Mesquita, Javiera Paz and Raquel Sánchez, and singing by Perrate.

Morphine premiered at Teatro de la Abadía in January 2026 as a solo combining Andalusian ritual, popular Mediterranean religious culture, family memory and the writing of Emmy Hennings. The 55-minute work used dramaturgy by Pedro G. Romero and took its title from a Hennings poem; its three sections move from pendulum-like gestures to a table owned by Arcas's great-great-uncle and a final mirror.

In May 2026 the Spanish National Dance Company premiered Masa, Arcas's work for 23 dancers based on Elias Canetti's Crowds and Power, as part of the double bill Struere at Centro de Danza Matadero. Writing in eldiario.es, Pablo Caruana Húder described Masa as a study of the collective body in which movement and energy pass between dancers, and noted Arcas's rejection of conventional ballet shapes.

== Awards ==
Arcas's earlier prizes include Injuve and Málaga Crea in 2009, the El Ojo Crítico dance award and the Lorca best female dance performer award in 2015, and the 2023 Godot Award for best dance production for Mariana; she was a finalist for best female dance performer at the Premios Max in 2017 and 2022. In 2024 she won the National Dance Award for Creation, a €30,000 prize awarded by Spain's Ministry of Culture.
