= Antonio Canales =

Antonio Canales may refer to:

- Antonio Canales Rosillo (1802–1852), Mexican politician, surveyor, and military officer
- Antonio Canales (flamenco) (born 1961), flamenco dancer and choreographer
