= Antonia Jiménez =

Spanish Flamenco Guitarist and Composer

Antonia Jiménez (born 1972) is an inland flamenco guitarist and composer, considered to be one of the most prominent Spanish women in that field.

She was born in El Puerto de Santa María and studied guitar with Antonio Villar from a young age. She accompanied flamenco singers and dancers in Andalusia, later moving to Madrid. She became an accompanist for the Nuevo Ballet Español and Arrieritos dance companies. She also pursued further studies in guitar with Enrique Vargas.

Jiménez has accompanied singers including Carmen Linares and Juan Pinilla and dancers including Merche Esmeralda, Olga Pericet, Rocío Molina, Manuel Liñán and Belén Maya. She performed in dancer Marco Flores' show De Flamencas and created her own production Dos Tocaoras, where she performed with Marta Robles.

On International Women's Day in 2005, Jiménez and Robles accompanied Carmen Linares in the show La Diosa Blanca, the first time two women flamenco guitarists performed together on stage.
