= Antonio Canales (flamenco) =

Spanish flamenco dancer

- Born: Antonio Gómez de los Reyes; 3 December 1961 (age 64); Seville, Spain

Antonio Gómez de los Reyes known as Antonio Canales is a male flamenco dancer and choreographer born in Seville.

== Biography ==
He was born in Seville in 1961. He began his studies at the Spanish National Ballet. In 1981, signed by Víctor Ullate, he became a solo dancer at the Spanish National Ballet in Madrid.

In 1985, he moved to Paris where he joined the company of Maguy Marin. Maguy Marin opened the doors for him to the world of dance on an international level. He has shared the stage with dancers such as Rudolf Nureyev, Maya Plisetskaya, Carla Fracci, Vladimir Vasilev, Fernando Bujones, Peter Schaufuss, Sylvie Guillem, Patrick Dupond and Julio Bocca.

In 1992 he set up his own company and he debuted in Bilbao with the choreographies: A Ti, Carmen Amaya and Siempre Flamenco. In January 1992 he participated in the gala Gigantes de la Danza, at the Teatro de los Campo Elíseos, in Paris. The same year on the celebrations of the Fifth Centenary of the discovery of America, he performed at the World Financial Center in New York, at the Holland Festival in the Netherlands and at the Metki Hall in Tokyo.

In 1993, he premiered Torero at the Theater Place D, Arts of Montreal where he began a long tour at cities of Canada. His show Torero was nominated for an Emmy award and in the same year, Antonio Canales was awarded the National Dance Award.

In 1994 and 1995 he was invited to participate in the gala Estrellas de Montreal, in Canada, and in 1997 he participated in the Gala of the Stars organized by the Ballet of Monte Carlo.

In the 1995 edition of the EMMY awards, the TVE performance of the choreography of Antonio Canales, "TORERO" was nominated by Spain in the category of "Artistic Presentation", remaining semifinalist.

In February 1996, Antonio Canales was awarded with the NATIONAL DANCE PRIZE of 1995 at the National Auditorium (Mexico).

In 1996, the Torero choreography was awarded with the silver medal at FIPA 96 (Biarritz). In the same year, Antonio Canales premiered his production Gitano in which Sara Baras was an invited artist. This show was presented at the Bienal de Flamenco de Sevilla and toured at the Festival de Otoño in Madrid in the Albéniz Theater, the Champs Elysees Theater.

In January 1997, he was the representative of dance in Europe, within the framework of the Gala of Stars of Dance.

In November 1998, due to the Autumn Festival of Madrid he opened a new show named Bengues. It was the fruit of the first collaboration between Antonio Canales (choreography) and D. Lluis Pasqual (stage direction). That same year, fulfilling an order from the National Ballet of Spain, he performed the choreography, Grito, which was presented in February 1998 at the City Center in New York.

In the first edition of the MAX Awards for Performing Arts, by the Autor Foundation and SGAE, Antonio Canales was awarded the prize for the best dance performance for his work Gitano.

In June 1998, he debuted at the Teatro Apolo in Madrid with his choreography Raiz. In that period, the Municipal School of Antonio Canales was born. (Escuela Municipal de Danza Antonio Canales). Today they study more than three hundred children, and in which today continues working.

In July 13, 1999, on the musical nights "MURALLA DE AVILA" he premiered his new choreography: Fuerza Latina. In the same year, he received the MAX award as Best Dance Performer. Combining his performances, and during the months of September and October, Antonio Canales shot his second film entitled Vengo by Tony Gatlif as the protagonist. In 1999 he was awarded with the medal of Andalusia, for artists who have helped to spread the name of their land around the world. In December, he made his debut at the Teatro de la Zarzuela in Madrid as a guest artist of the National Ballet of Spain performing a choreography that he created for this occasion, entitled A blinds. At the same time ended his third choreography for the BNE Mirabraso.

In 2000, he made his debut in Zaragoza at the Teatro Principal Cinderella. In the month of July, the Festival of Classical Theater of Mérida, chose a choreography for the inauguration of Prometheus Festival which was broadcast live on the international channel of TVE and on TV2. In September the Flamenco Festival of the Seville Bienal closed at the Teatro de la Maestranza with the show Bailaor. In the 4th edition of the Max Performing Arts Awards, Antonio Canales received the award for the best dance performer.

In 2001, he made his 4th choreography for the BNE A tientas under the direction of Elvira de Andrés.

In March 2002, the first novel by Antonio Canales Sangre de Albero was published. In April, the company's 10th anniversary commemorated with the re-release of the show Torero and a selection of numbers from the works A ti Carmen Amaya, The House of Bernarda Alba, Gitano and Bailaor.

In 2003, he premiered at the Lope de Vega theater in Seville, Ojos Verdes. Work dedicated to the poet and rancher, Fernando Villalón. In the fourth edition of the MAX Awards he is again awarded the "Best Dance Artist" Award.

In 2004 he premiered the work Carmen Carmela, based on the work of Prosper Mérimée with music by Bizet and arrangements for flamenco guitar under the direction of Miguel Narros. In the same year he participated in the XIII Flamenco Bienal of Seville with Paco de Lucía, Tomatito and Eva Yerbabuena.

In 2005 he premiered the work Sangre de Oedipus at the Classic Theater Festival of Mérida. In the same year he participated as himself in the film “Iberia” directed by Carlos Saura. The film was premiered in November 2005.

At the end of 2006 he presented his work Musical Flamenco Los Grandes in the auditorium of the University of las Palmas. Also, he participated for the second time in the El Flamenco comes from the South. In the same year, he attended the Albuquerque USA Flamenco Festival.

In 2007, he was invited to participate in the International Festival of Cante de las Minas 2007. The same year he returned to Madrid after 2 seasons of absence from the capital with the debut of his show Los Grandes.

In 2009, he traveled to Caracas in Venezuela with the staging of La Casa de Bernarda Alba and Flamenco Puro, in two presentations at the Teresa Carreño Theater. Also, he was a special guest for the Madrid 2009 Dance Marathon.

In 2010, Antonio Canales traveled to Guanajuato when he was invited to participate in the Exhibition for the Bicentennial of the Independence of Mexico, with the show Solitudes of stone and sky. In November of the same year he participated as guest artist in the gala of the FEHR awards. During the following years he had taken his version of the House of Bernarda Alba and the Flamenkura work, to the stages. In collaboration with the Cervantes Institute, he had carried out projects such as Cuenta Con Migo amigo, where through stories he explained to the children what Flamenco is. In March 2010, he represented for 2 years the show MANO A MANO with the young dancer Amador Rojas, beginning with the Palau de la Música Catalana of Barcelona.

== Filmography ==
- 1989 Montoyas y Tarantos, as Diego Taranto, Directed by Vicente Escrivá
- 1993 Una gloria nacional (TV Series)
- 1996 Faces of Dance, Directed by Bernar Hébert
- 2000 Vengo, as Caco, Directed by Tony Gatlif
- 2005 Iberia, as himself, Directed by Carlos Saura
- 2007 Ekipo Ja, as Bailarín, Directed by Juan Muñoz
- 2015 Maldita venganza, as El Brujo, Directed by David Chamizo

== Awards ==
- 1988 Italian Prize Mavisela as the "Best Dancer"
- 1990 Mejor Bailarin Internacional in Mexico City
- 1995 Nomination for the 1995 Emmy Awards
- 1995 National Dance Award for the “Torero” show.
- 1999 Medal of Andalusia for his contribution to the dissemination of the culture of the state abroad.
- 2000 Max Awards “Best Dance Performer”
- 2003 Max Awards “Best Dance Artist”
