= La Chunga =

Spanish artist (1938–2025)

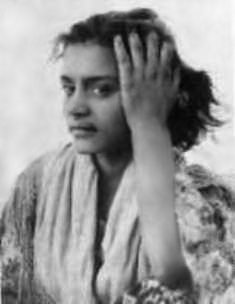
- Picture of La Chunga
- Born: Micaela Flores Amaya; 1938; Marseille, France
- Died: 3 January 2025 (aged 87)
- Occupations: flamenco dancer, naive artist
- Years active: 1944–2025
- Spouse: José Luis Gonzalvo
- Children: 1
- Relatives: Carmen Amaya (maternal cousin)

Micaela Flores Amaya (1938 – 3 January 2025), better known by the stage name La Chunga, was a Spanish flamenco dancer, and painter of naïf art.

== Early life ==
Micaela Flores Amaya was born in Marseille, France, in 1938, although the exact date of her birth remains unknown. Her parents were Andalusian Romanis, who emigrated to France during the Spanish Civil War. When she was less than a year old, her family moved to Barcelona. Additionally, she was the sister of flamenco dancer Lorenza Flores Amaya, "La Chunguita", and cousin of famed flamenco dancer Carmen Amaya.

La Chunga started dancing when she was six years-old in the "Ca La Rosita", a well-known bodega for the Romanì community in El Poble-Sec. It was at this time she was discovered by painter Francisco "Paco" Rebés, during one of her improvised street performances. Rebés would later take her under his tutelage, and assume the role of her godfather.

== Career ==
La Chunga became the 'muse' of several writers, including Blas de Otero, Rafael Alberti, José Manuel Caballero Bonald, and León Felipe, as well as several painters, including Pablo Picasso, Salvador Dalí, and the aforementioned Francisco Rebés, who made her an attractive character for intellectuals and encouraged her to paint. A 1958 photo shows Salvador Dalí inviting her to make art by dancing on a blank canvas. During intervals, Dali would paint beneath her feet. She was known for her barefoot style of flamenco dance and described as "The Barefoot Dancer". She was admired by Picasso as a "shining naif". She also exhibited in several galleries in Paris and Madrid. After then, Chunga participated in many tours and some films.

In 1970, she began collaborating with guitarist Luis Adame and was the artist who inaugurated the Tablao Flamenco Cordobes on Las Ramblas in Barcelona.

== Personal life and death ==
La Chunga married director José Luis Gonzalvo, and they had a daughter, Pilar.

La Chunga died on 3 January 2025, at the age of 87.

== Filmography ==
- Tip on a Dead Jockey (1957) directed by Richard Thorpe
- Back to the Door (1959) directed by José María Forqué
- El último verano (1961) by Juan Bosch
- Juan Pedro the Scyther ( (1969) by José Luis Gonzalvo
- "Cierto reflejos: La Chunga" (1978) by Mario Gomez Martin
- Vampire in Venice (1988) by Augusto Caminito
- Papa Piquillo (1998) by Alvaro Saenz de Heredia

== Prizes ==
- Medalla de Oro del Círculo de Bellas Artes de Madrid,
- Medalla Oro de la Asociación de la Prensa de Sevilla
- Trofeo Delfín de Alicante
- Premio del Ayuntamiento de Alicante
- Premio Cidale de los Almendros.
