= Igor Yebra =

Spanish freelance ballet dancer (born 1974)

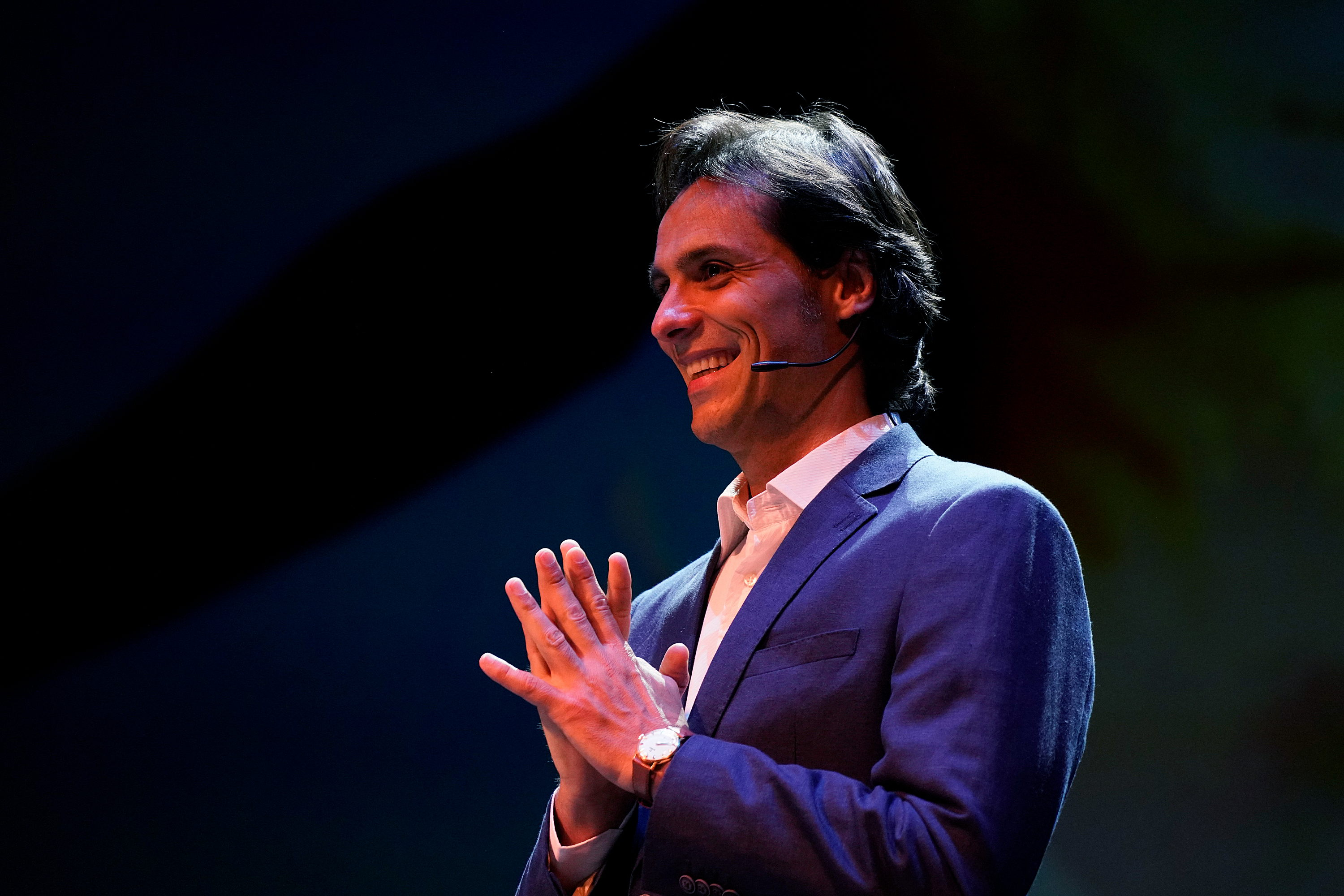
- Igor Yebra in 2020
- Born: Igor Yebra Iglesias; August 1, 1974 (age 51); Bilbao (Biscay), Spain
- Education: Victor Ullate
- Known for: Ballet
- Awards: Eurovision Grand Prix

Igor Yebra Iglesias (born August 1, 1974, Bilbao) is a Spanish freelance ballet dancer.

== Early life ==
Igor Yebra was born in Bilbao, Spain, and was encouraged to start dancing by his parents, two music and dance enthusiasts who named him Igor in honour of the title character in Borodin's opera.

Surrounded by ballet and music during his childhood, primarily due to his parents' dance school, Igor never considered becoming a professional dancer and, just like other Spanish children, he dreamed of being a football player. It was only after his parents took him to see Aram Khachaturyan's ballet Spartacus, starring the Bolshoi's principal Vladimir Vasiliev, that he became aware of the masculinity that ballet could have, and started attending classes locally. He then moved to Madrid where he entered Victor Ullate's dance school and started formal training at the considerably late age of 13.

== Career ==
Igor has trained with a multitude of Spanish teachers including Karemia Moreno, Lázaro Carreño, Pino Alosa and Ángela Santos. He started dancing professionally with Ullate's company, Ballet de la Comunidad de Madrid while still a student in Madrid. He graduated with honours from the Real Conservatorio Profesional de Danza.

Igor remained with the company for six years, eventually becoming a principal. During this time he danced various contemporary and neo-classical ballets, including pieces from choreographers Van Manen, Rudi van Dantzing, Jan Linkens, Nils Christie, Amodio, Balanchine, Micha Van Hoecke y and Ullate himself.

Yebra started his career as a freelance dancer at the end of 1996 and joined Australian Ballet as a guest, despite receiving offers from recognized companies like the New York City Ballet, Ballet Estable del Teatro Colón, Scottish Ballet and American Ballet Theatre.

He is mostly recognized as a danseur noble and it is from the time he left Ullate's company that he managed to expand his classical and romantic repertoire to include various choreographed versions of Giselle, Don Quixote, La Sylphide, Romeo and Juliet, Swan Lake, Coppélia, Les Sylphides, The Nutcracker, The Sleeping Beauty and variations from Le Corsaire and La Bayadère. His contemporary repertoire is an array of neoclassical-type ballets, including George Balanchine's Theme and Variations, Concerto Barroco, Allegro Brillante and Tschaikovsky Pas de Deux.

He has appeared as a guest artist with Aterballetto, Ballet à l'opera de Nice, Ballet Nacional de Cuba, Ballet Nacional de Venezuela, Kremlin Ballet Theatre, the Bolshoi, the Kirov, Scottish Ballet, Rome Opera Ballet, Australian Ballet, Lithuanian National Opera and Ballet Theatre and the Arena di Verona Ballet and is a guest principal with the Ballet de l'Opéra National de Bordeaux.

As from 2001 he is a permanent guest and principal dancer with the Ballet de l'Opéra National de Bordeaux and the Rome Opera Theatre Ballet.

January 2004 marked his debut at the Kremlin Theatre dancing the title role in Sergei Prokofiev's ballet Ivan the Terrible, and making him the first non-Russian to dance such role.

He has created roles in various pieces including Carmen, La Traviata, Aida, The Dying Swan and Don José.

In February 2018, Igor Yebra took over as the new artistic director of the Nacional Ballet Sodre (BNS) Ballet, succeeding Julio Bocca.[x]

== Personal life ==
He married Basque television presenter Anne Igartiburu in September 2004, from who he separated soon after, in December 2005.

Igor realised one of his biggest dreams in 2006 when he opened a dance school in his hometown of Bilbao.

He is a football fan and supporter of his local team "Athletic Bilbao".

== Awards ==
- The Jury's Special Contemporary Prize at the Eurovision Grand Prix for Young Dancers, Paris, 1989.
- Best Dancer of the Year Award by "DANZA & DANZA Magazine", Italy, 1996.
- Second Male Prize at The II International "Maya Plisetskaya" Ballet Competition, 1996.
- Leonidas Massine Award, Italy, 2003.
