= Eva Yerbabuena =

Spanish flamenco dancer

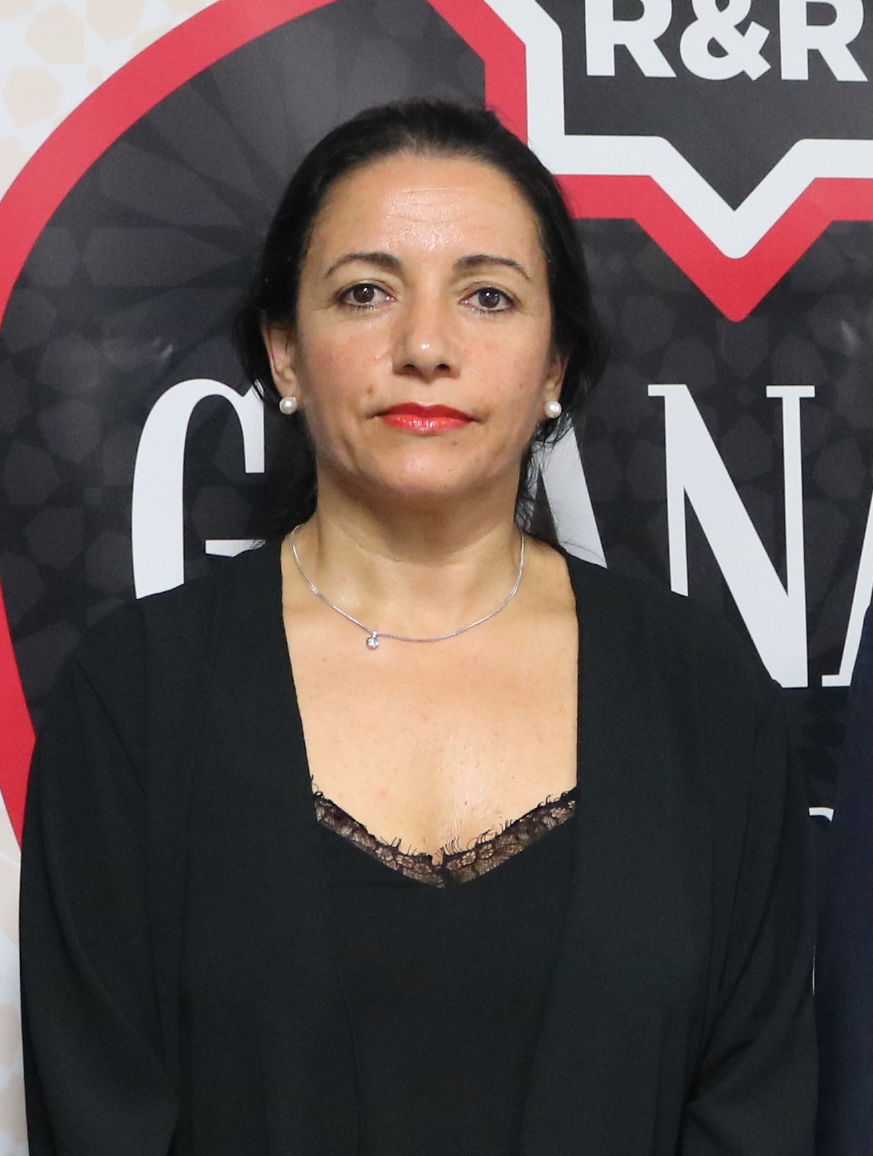
- Eva Yerbabuena in 2017
- Born: Eva María Garrido García; 1970 (age 55–56); Frankfurt, Germany

Eva María Garrido García, known professionally as Eva Yerbabuena, is a Spanish flamenco dancer. She formed her own dance company in 1998 and won Spain's National Dance Award (Premio Nacional de Danza) in 2001. She is considered one of flamenco's leading performers.

== Biography ==
Yerbabuena was born in Frankfurt, Germany in 1970, but fifteen days after her birth was taken by her parents to their hometown of Ogíjares in Granada, Spain, where she grew up with her grandparents until she was ten years old. At age 11 she began her dance career by taking flamenco classes. At the age of 12, she began to dance with Enrique "El Canastero", Angustillas "La Mona" and Mario Maya. Her professional career began at 15.

She studied dramatic arts with Juan Furest and Jesús Domínguez. Afterwards she travelled to Cuba to learn choreography from Johannes García. She was given the name "Yerbabuena" by a friend, Francisco Manuel Díaz, after a flamenco singer named Fransquito Yerbabuena. She has collaborated with Manolete, Merche Esmeralda, Javier Latorre, Joaquín Cortés, Mikhail Baryshnikov and Pina Bausch. Eva Yerbabuena Ballet Flamenco was established in 1998 including her guitarist and husband Paco Jarana as musical director.

She is married with the guitarist Paco Jarana, who is part of her shows as a musician and composer. The couple has two daughters.

== Career ==
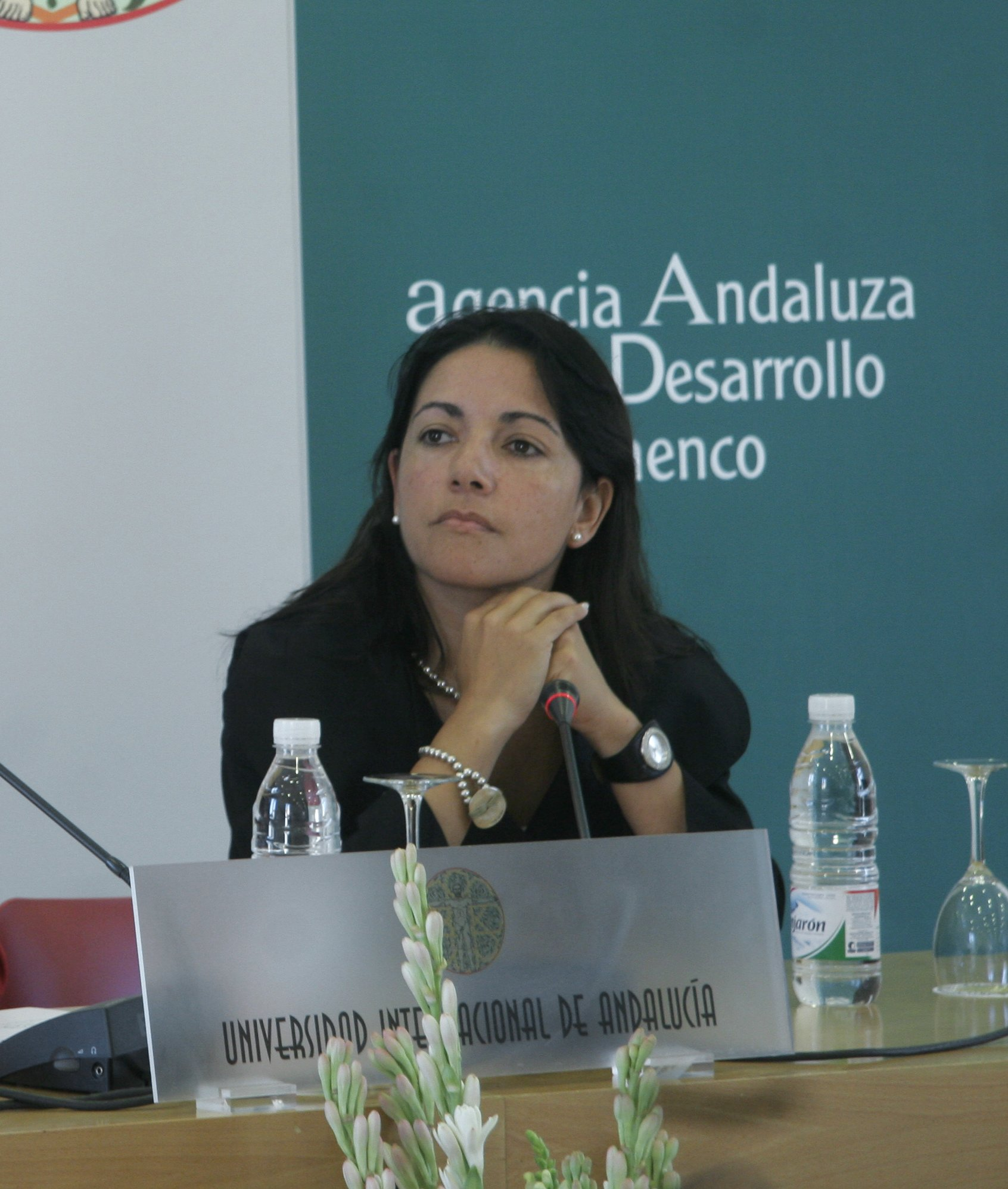
Eva la Yerbabuena in a lecture in 2007

In 1985, she started to work in Rafael Aguilar's company for the Diquela de la Alhambra show. In 1987, she joined Paco Moyano's company, with which she performed Ausencia, A tomar café and De leyenda.

In the 1990s, he was part of the dance troupe in La fuerza del destino, by Javier Latorre, and version of El amor brujo ballet by Manolete. She also participated in Mujeres, by Merche Esmeralda and worked with Joaquín Cortés in Jóvenes Flamencos.

In 1997 she created the choreography of the show La garra y el ángel.

In 1998 she performed at the City Center in New York and at the Teatro Real in Madrid as a guest artist of the Ballet Nacional de España, playing A mi niña Manuela. That same year she established her own company, Eva Yerbabuena Ballet Flamenco, with which she performed at the X Bienal de Flamenco de Sevilla to premiere her first production, Eva. In addition, she appeared together with Mijaíl Barýshnikov in Wuppertal on the occasion of the 25th anniversary of his company, where she had the opportunity to share stage with Marie-Claude Pietragalla, Ana Laguna and Sylvie Guillem.

In 2000 she premiered 5 mujeres 5 at the Teatro Lope de Vega in Seville, during the XI Bienal de Flamenco. It was his first work "with an argument" that she choreographed and also the first in which she hired a stage director, Hansel Cereza, of La Fura dels Baus.

In 2002 she participated in the second edition of the Flamenco Festival, held in New York. In October that year, she premiered La voz del silencio at the XII Bienal de Flamenco. The show, directed by Cereza, combined the poetry of Pablo Neruda and Luis Cernuda with flamenco music and dance.

In 2004, also as part of the Bienal de Flamenco de Sevilla, she premiered her fourth show A cuatro voces.

In 2005, she participated in the Fall for Dance festival in New York.

In early 2006, she toured extensively in Asia and Oceania, performing at theaters in Hong Kong, Tokyo and New Zealand. In October of the same year, she presented El huso de la memoria at the XIV Bienal de Flamenco. This work was also exhibited at the London Flamenco Festival in 2007. Yerbabuena participated again in this festival in 2009, with Lluvia, and ¡Ay! in 2013.

In 2016 she premiered Apariencias at the Festival de Jerez.

Eva Yerbabuena has also worked in cinema. In 1997 she participated in the documentary Flamenco Women, directed by Mike Figgis and, in 2001, in the film Hotel, by the same director.

== Films ==
In 1997 she appeared in Mike Figgis' documentary, Flamenco Women. In 2001 she featured in Figgis' film, Hotel. She also participated in Pulse: A Stomp Odyssey(2002) performing a Petenera with guitarist Paco Jarana that Variety described as the film's "showstopper"

== Awards ==
In 1999, 2000 and 2001, She won the award “Flamenco Hoy” to the best flamenco dancer given by “Crítica Nacional de Flamenco”.

In 2000, she was awarded the prize “Mejor Compañía” by “Flamenco Hoy” .

In 2000, she received the prize “Revelación ” by “El Público de Canal Sur”.

In 2001, she won the National Dance Award.

In 2002, she received Giraldillo Award to the best dancer.

In 2003, she won Time Out Award.

In 2005, she received “Mejor Intérprete de Danza and Mejor Espectáculo de Danza por Eva, a cal y canto” by Max Awards.

In 2007, she was given the “Medalla de Andalucía”.

In 2025, she won the 2025 Laurence Olivier Award Outstanding Achievement in Dance.
