= El Cordobés =

Spanish bullfighter

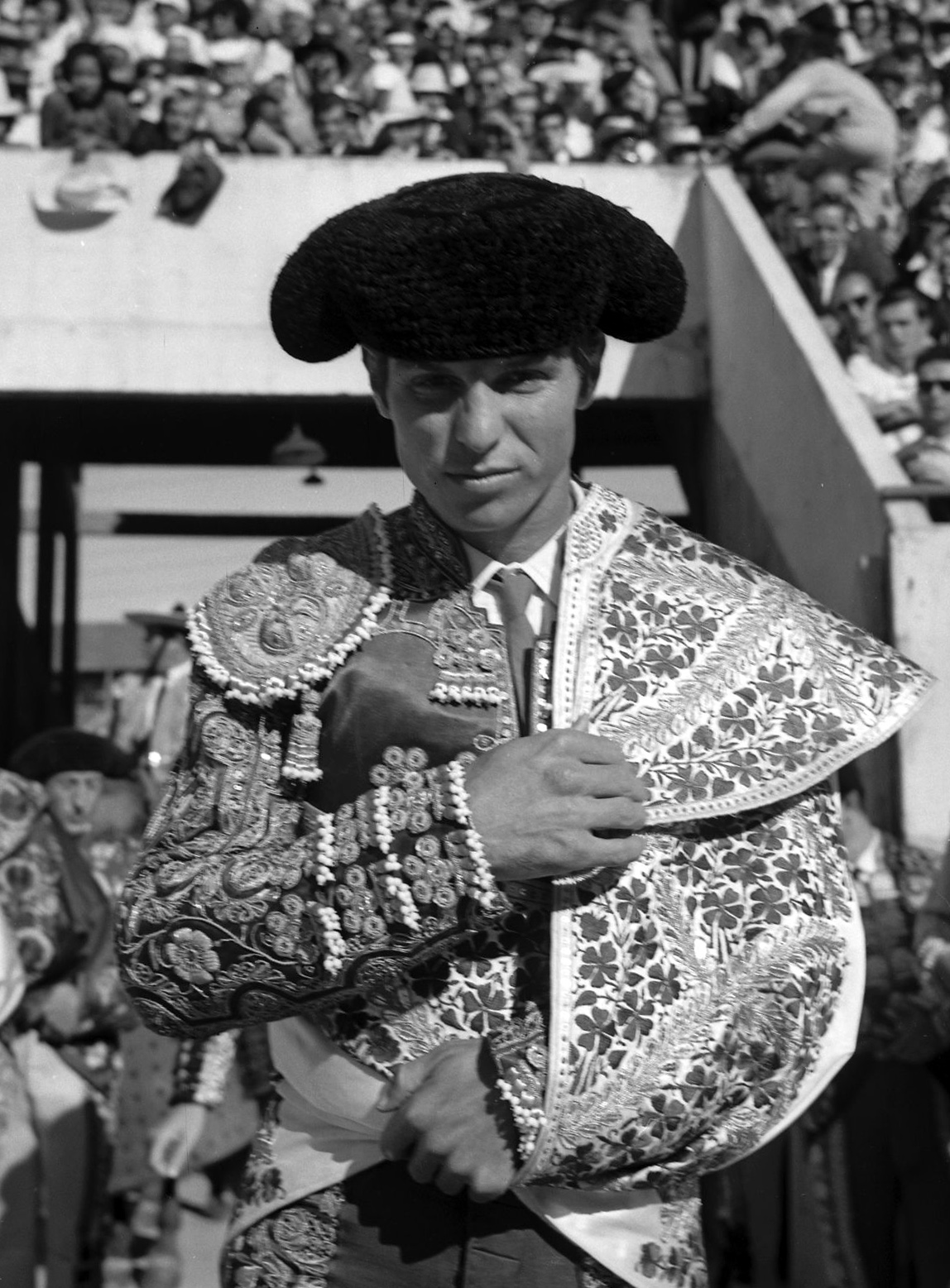
- El Cordobés on 19 September 1966

Personal information
- Nickname: El Cordobés (The Cordovan)
- Nationality: Spanish
- Born: Manuel Benítez Pérez; 4 May 1936 (age 89) Palma del Río, Andalusia, Spain
- Occupation(s): Matador, actor, bullfighter

Sport
- Sport: Bullfighting

Manuel Benítez Pérez (born 4 May 1936), more commonly known as El Cordobés (The Cordovan), is a Spanish matador, and actor active in the 1960s who brought an unorthodox acrobatic and theatrical style to the bullring.

== Career ==
One of the original techniques practiced by El Cordobés was first shown at Anjucar. He waved his banderilla (Columpio) away, broke his banderillas down to 'pencil length', and standing with his back to the bull as it charged, moved his right leg out moments before the bull was upon him, causing the bull to swerve and allowing El Cordobés a moment to slam in the banderillas from just behind the left horn. This maneuver was repeated in bullfights across Spain, sometimes with even more dangerous variations, such as standing with his back to the barerra and driving in the banderillas after the horns passed either side of him. On May 20, 1964, when he made his first appearance at Las Ventas in Madrid, the bullfight ended with the near-fatal goring of El Cordobés on the horns of the bull Impulsivo. Twenty-two days later El Cordobés fought again.

By the time of his first retirement, in 1971, El Cordobés had become the highest-paid matador in history. After eight years of retirement, he returned to bullfighting in 1979. Following an incident in 1983, when a bull that he was about to fight killed an espontáneo (bystander who jumps into bullring), El Cordobés was criticized by the press for allowing it to happen.

El Cordobés continued to make occasional appearances as a matador until 2000, when he retired permanently. He also acted in several motion pictures. El Cordobés lives in near seclusion near Córdoba. In 2016 he appeared with the woman bullfighter Conchi Ríos and Antonio Puerta in Cehegín in Murcia.

== In art, entertainment, and media ==
An early biography, Or I'll Dress You in Mourning, by journalists Larry Collins and Dominique Lapierre, was published in 1968 by Simon & Schuster. In 1966, Italian-French singer Dalida released an album titled "El Cordobes" with the first track called Manuel Benitez "El Cordobes". The song is available in two languages: Spanish and French. El Cordobés' story was also the basis for the musical Matador (1987) by Mike Leander and Eddie Seago. Poet Mike O'Connor included "Canción del Cordobés", about the matador's breakout performances in Mexico City in 1964, in his poetry volume When the Tiger Weeps, (2005). A song titled "El Cordobés" was performed by the Norwegian rap artist Diaz.

One of Barcelona's most iconic tablaos, the Tablao Flamenco Cordobes, opened in 1970 and named after the bullfighter El Cordobes, who was at the height of his fame at the time.

== See also ==
- List of bullfighters
