= Anne Igartiburu =

Spanish Basque television presenter and actress (born 1969)

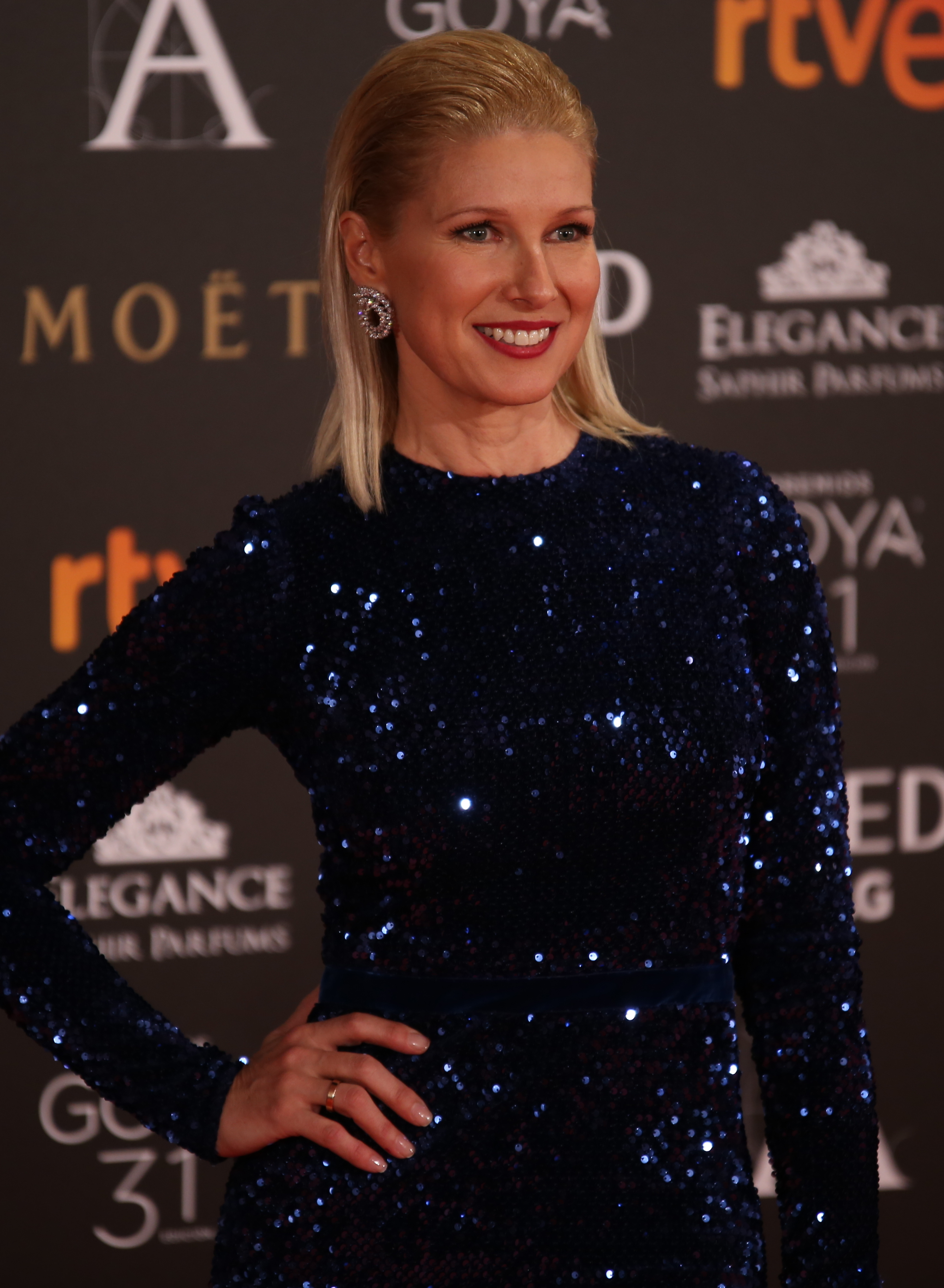
- Born: Anne Igartiburu Verdes; 18 February 1969 (age 57); Elorrio (Biscay), Spain
- Occupations: Television presenter, actress
- Years active: 1993–present
- Spouses: Igor Yebra (m. 2004–2006) Pablo Heras-Casado (m. 2015)
- Children: 3

Anne Igartiburu Verdes (born 18 February 1969 in Elorrio, Biscay, Spain) is a Basque television presenter and actress.

== Biography ==
She studied Industrial Marketing. She started working in the local television of Mondragón in 1993. She then worked in Euskal Telebista, and later in Telecinco, hosting Una pareja feliz alongside Antonio Hidalgo in the 1994–95 season.

Since 1997, Igartiburu has presented daily celebrity news programme Corazón on Televisión Española, except for a period in 2012–13 when she presented daily infotainment show +Gente. From 2005 to 2009 she hosted the Spanish adaptation of Dancing with the Stars (¡Mira quién baila!). In 2006 she hosted the special show Gala 50 años de TVE, which celebrated the 50th anniversary of TVE, alongside Laura Valenzuela and Paula Vázquez.

Since 2005, Igartiburu has presented the annual New Year's Eve celebration broadcast for TVE live from Madrid's Puerta del Sol. Igartiburu has also been associated with the Eurovision Song Contest: she was the Spanish spokesperson in the 2002, 2003 and 2004 contests, and she hosted the Spanish national final in 2010, 2011, 2012, 2014, and 2016.

=== Personal life ===
She was married to ballet dancer Igor Yebra from 2004 to 2006. Igartiburu has two adopted daughters, Noa (born 2000 in India) and Carmen (born 2011 in Vietnam). In 2015, she married conductor Pablo Heras-Casado. On 13 June 2016 she gave birth to their first baby son, Nicolás.

== Filmography ==
=== Television ===
Year	TV program	Notes
1993	Boulevard	
1994–1995	Una pareja feliz	With Antonio Hidalgo.
1994	Vamos a montar el Belén	
1995	La gran oportunidad	With Patxi Alonso.
1996	Hau da marka	With Klaudio Landa.
1997	El imperdible	
1997	Maridos y mujeres	With Alonso Caparrós.
1997–2012, 2013–present	Corazón	
2005–2009	¡Mira quién baila!	
2005–present	New Year's Eve celebration yearly broadcast for TVE	With a yearly co-host.
2010	Destino Oslo, La Gala de Eurovisión 2010	
2010	Cántame cómo pasó	
2010	Un beso y una flor	
2011	Destino Eurovisión	
2012	Eurovisión:Pastora Soler	
2012–2013	+Gente	
2014	Mira quién va a Eurovisión	
2016	Objetivo Eurovisión	
2021	Mask Singer: Adivina quién canta	Season 2 contestant; competed as "Monstruita"
2021	Duelo en las alturas	

=== Film ===
Year	Film	Role	Director
1996	Adiós tiburón	Elena	Carlos Suárez
1996	Menos que cero	Radio journalist	Ernesto Talleria
1997	Suerte	Amaia	Ernesto Talleria
2003	El lápiz del carpintero	Izarne	Antón Reixa
2009	Zorion perfektua	Ainhoa	Jabi Elortegi

== Awards ==
- Antena de Oro (2005)
