= Goyo Montero =

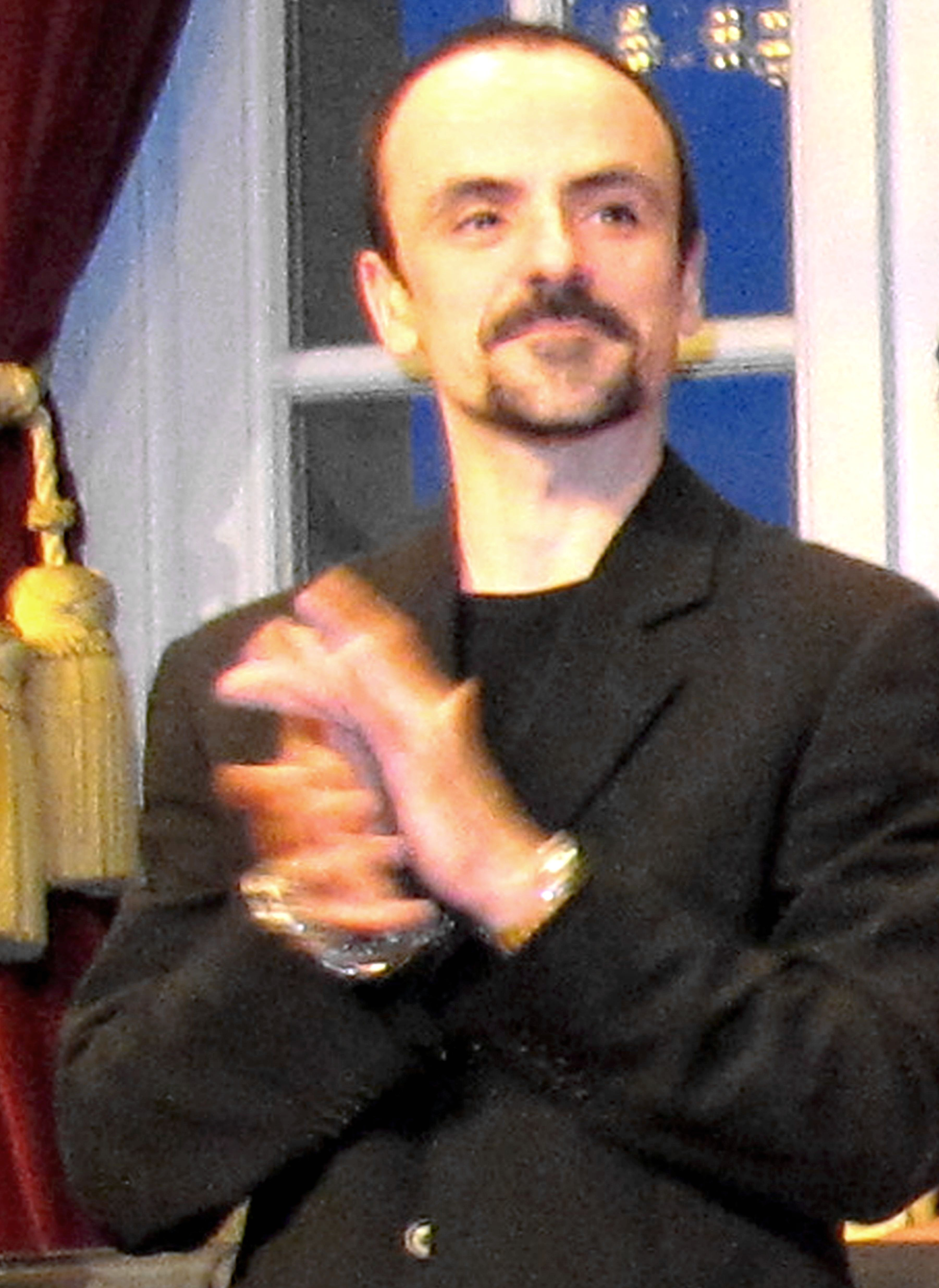
Goyo Montero Morell

Goyo Montero Morell (born 1975 in Spain, Madrid) is a Spanish ballet dancer, a ballet director and a choreographer.

Born in 1975 in Madrid, Spain. He was formed by Carmen Roche and completed his studies at the Royal Conservatory for Professional Dance in Madrid and the School of the National Ballet of Cuba. Among others he received the following awards as a dancer: Winner of the Prix de Lausanne in 1994 and gold medal and Grand Prix at the International Ballet Competition of Luxembourg. Critics of Dance Europe Magazine nominated him Best Dancer of the season 2003/2004.

Goyo Montero was Principal Dancer at the Deutsche Oper Berlin (from 1999 to 2004) and Soloist at the Oper Leipzig, Staatstheater Wiesbaden and the Royal Ballet of Flanders. He has been invited among others as guest soloist with the National Ballet of Mexico, the Perth City Ballet and the Ballet d‘Europe.

As choreographer he created pieces for Les Ballets de Monte-Carlo, São Paulo Companhia de Dança, Royal Ballet London, Zurich Ballet, Acosta Danza, Perm Opera Ballet/Diana Vishneva Context Festival, National Ballet Sodre, Maggio Danza, Compañia Nacional de Danza, Deutsche Oper Berlin, Opera of Kiel, Ankara and Izmir State Ballet, Modern Dance Turkey, the Company Gregor Seyffert, Ballet Carmen Roche, Cuban National Ballet, and the Ballet de Teatres de la Generalitat Valenciana.

With his choreographies Goyo Montero took part in different festivals, amongst others in Havana (XX International Ballet Festival), Florence (71st Maggio Musicale Fiorentino), Granada (International Festival of Dance and Music), Zaragoza (Expo Zaragoza), Madrid (Madrid en Danza and Veranos de la Villa), Tokyo (Expo Aichi Tokio Forum), Russia (Chekhov International Theatre Festival Moscow and Diana Vishneva's Context Festival) and Holland Dance Festival.

Goyo Montero's choreography “Imponderable” for Acosta Danza had its world premiere in September 2017 at Sadler's Wells London and is since then part of the worldwide tour of this company. His creation “Asunder”, created for Diana Vishneva's Context Festival, has been presented in November 2017 at the Stanislawski Theatre Moscow, the Mariinsky Theatre St. Petersburg and in Sadler's Wells London. “Asunder” got furthermore nominated in 2019 as Best Choreography for the Russian Golden Mask Award."

With season 2008/2009 Goyo Montero is ballet director and principal choreographer of Nuremberg Ballet. Until today the ballet director has developed and staged 20 creations for his company in Nuremberg.

Since 2019 Goyo Montero is also Resident Choreographer of Acosta Danza.

A long term partnership exists between Goyo Montero and the Prix de Lausanne. In 2012 and 2017 Goyo Montero has been member of the jury at the Prix de Lausanne. From 2013 until 2016 his choreographies have been part of the contemporary repertoire of this competition. In 2018 Goyo Montero created together with 51 students from the partner companies of the Prix the new choreography “Pulse”, set to music by Owen Belton. In 2017 his creations have been part of the Beijing International Ballet und Choreography Competition in China.

Among his awards as Choreographer: In 2006 the award “Villa de Madrid” (the 1st award of the Iberoamerican competition of Choreography), the Villanueva award by the UNEAC (Union of Writers, Critics and Artists of Cuba) and the award “Teatro de Madrid”.

In 2009 Goyo Montero has been awarded with the cultural prize of the Chamber of Industry and Commerce of Middle Franconia. In 2012 Goyo Montero got awarded by the Spanish Ministry of Culture with the Premio Nacional de Danza. In 2014 Goyo Montero received the Bavarian Culture Award. In 2018 the ‘Deutscher Tanzpreis’ (German Dance Award) has been presented to Ballet Nuremberg under the directorship of Goyo Montero for outstanding development in dance.

International Dance Magazines repeatedly nominated Goyo Montero as choreographer (amongst others "Choreographer of the Year 2014" in Dance for You) as well as for his works (amongst others nominations) as Best Choreography for "Sleeping Beauty" as best Italian production in 2008“ by Danza & Danza; for his ballet "Romeo and Juliet" with Compañia Nacional de Danza in Dance for you and Dance Europe (2012/2013); as well as for "Black Bile" (2014), "Cyrano" (2015) and "Don Quijote" (2017) in Dance Europe. Dance Europe's "Critics' Choice" nominated Goyo Montero in 2018 as Best Ballet director of the year.
