= Doña Mencía =

- Municipality
- Seal

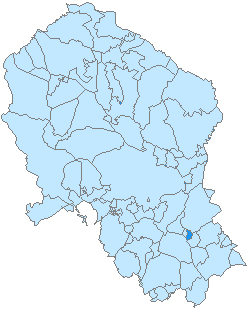
- Coordinates: 37°33′N 4°21′W
- Country: Spain
- Province: Córdoba
- Municipality: Doña Mencía

Area
  - Total: 15 km^{2} (5.8 sq mi)
- Elevation: 590 m (1,940 ft)

Population (2025-01-01)
  - Total: 4,465
  - Density: 300/km^{2} (770/sq mi)
- Time zone: UTC+1 (CET)
  - Summer (DST): UTC+2 (CEST)
- Website: www.donamencia.es

Doña Mencía is a municipality located in the province of Córdoba, Spain. According to the 2024 census (INE), the city has a population of 4478. It is located in the comarca Subbética, at an altitude of 590 meters.

== Notable people ==
- Niño Ruven (born 1997), musician and composer

== See also ==
- List of municipalities in Córdoba
