= Lola Greco =

Spanish choreographer and dancer

Maria Dolores Greco Arroyo widely known as Lola Greco (born 1964) is a Spanish ballerina and choreographer. After training with the Ballet Nacional de España (Spanish National Ballet), she joined the company, gaining the rank of prima ballerina when she was just 19. In 1983 she made her first appearance in Paris. She went on to dance in the company created by her father, José Greco, touring the United States. In 1999, she created her own company. In the early 2000s she returned to the National Ballet, both as a performer and a choreographer. Before leaving the stage, in 2009 she took the leading role in Miguel Narros' Flamenco work Fedra, choreographed by Javier Latorre. That year she was honoured with the Spanish National Dance Award for performance.

== Early life ==
Born in Madrid in 1964, Dolores Greco Arroyo is the daughter of the celebrated Italian-born Flamenco dancer Constanzo José Greco and his wife the dancer Aurelia Arroyo Garrido, generally known as Lola de Ronda. She was one of the couple's three children. When she was 14, she was admitted to the school of the Spanish National Ballet which led to her being engaged by the company.

== Career ==
At the Spanish National Ballet, Greco was promoted to solo dancer when she was 17 and to prima ballerina when 19. Internationally, she first appeared in Salome at the Paris Opera in 1983 and at Milan's La Scala in I vespri siciliani in 1990. She has appeared in Medeo with José Granero, as Julieta in Felipe Sánchez's Los Tarantos and in José Antonio Ruiz's Laberinto. She has also appeared widely in the United States, touring with her father José Greco.

In 1998, together with her sister Carmela, she established her own company and toured Italy. She has successfully collaborated with the choreographer Philippe Talart. In December 2001 in Valencia with the Spanish National Ballet, she danced to the music of Concierto de Aranjuez in a presentation celebrating the 100th anniversary of Joaquin Rodrigo. Before retiring from the stage, in 2009 she took the leading role in Miguel Narros' Flamenco work Fedra, choreographed by Javier Latorre.

== Awards ==
In 2009. Lola Greco was honoured with the Spanish National Dance Award for performance.
