= Vengo (film) =

- Directed by: Tony Gatlif
- Written by: Tony Gatlif; David Trueba
- Produced by: Tony Gatlif; Luis Ángel Bellaba
- Starring: Antonio Canales
- Cinematography: Thierry Pouget
- Edited by: Pauline Dairou
- Music by: Tony Gatlif
- Production company: Princes Films
- Release date: 2000
- Running time: 90 minutes
- Countries: France; Spain; Germany; Japan
- Languages: French; Spanish

Vengo is a 2000 Spanish-French-German-Japanese film directed and written by Tony Gatlif. It is a musical drama about two Andalusia gypsy families locked in an age-old struggle for power. The film features a performance by Spanish flamenco singer Maria del Carmen Salazar ("La Caita").

== Plot ==
With flamenco dancing as the backdrop and cultural theme, the primary storyline centres around a feud between Spanish Gypsies. Caco (played by Antonio Canales) as the main character, must fight for his family's honor and safety.

== Cast ==
- Antonio Canales: Caco
- Orestes Villasan Rodriguez: Diego
- Antonio Dechent: Primo Alejandro
- Bobote: Habib
- Juan Luis Corrientes: Primo Tres

== Reception ==
Vengo was selected as closing film at the 57th Venice International Film Festival in 2000.
