= Lucía Lacarra =

Spanish ballet dancer

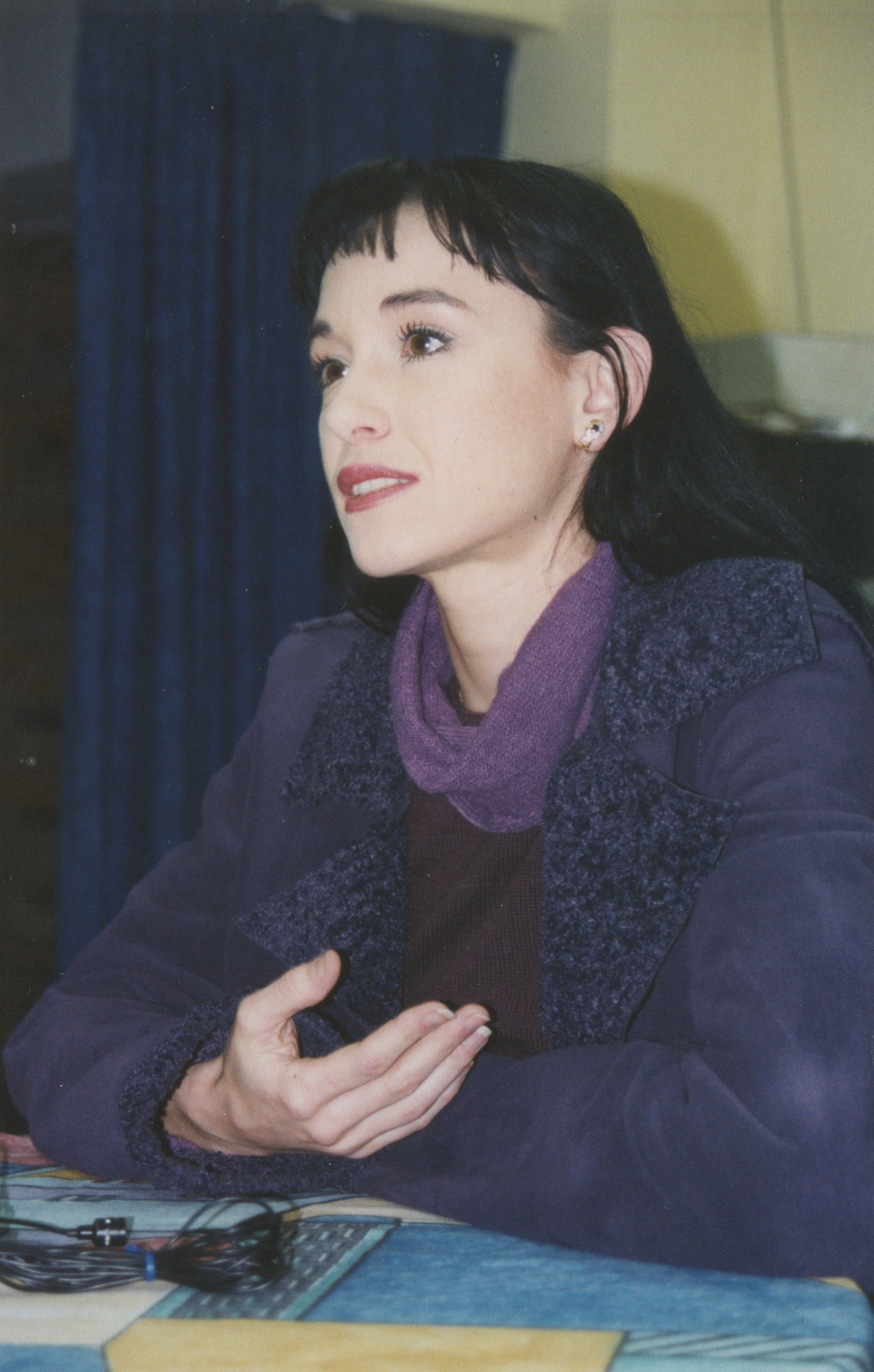
- Lucía Lacarra in 2003
- Born: 24 March 1975 (age 50); Zumaia, Gipuzkoa
- Occupation: Ballerina
- Years active: 1985-present
- Organizations: Ballet National de Marseille; San Francisco Ballet; Bayerisches Staatsballett
- Awards: Nijinsky Award (2002); Prix Benois de la Danse (2003); Dancer of the Decade (2011)

Lucía Lacarra (born 24 March 1975) is a Spanish ballet dancer who has been a principal with the Bayerisches Staatsballett (Bavarian State Opera Ballet) from 2002 to 2016. A recipient of the Prix Benois de la Danse, she was named the Dancer of the Decade in 2011, at the World Ballet Stars Gala in Saint Petersburg.

== Early life ==
Born in the Basque town of Zumaia, Gipuzkoa, Lacarra was interested in dance from an early age but only received training from the age of 10 when a ballet school opened in her hometown. After participating in a summer course run by Rosella Hightower, she studied for three years with Mentxu Medel in San Sebastián before attending Víctor Ullate's school in Madrid, along with Tamara Rojo and Angel Corella. She soon became a member of his Ballet de Victor Ullate, dancing George Balanchine's Allegro Brillante when she was 15, as well as other modern abstract ballets.

== Career ==
After four seasons with Ullate, she moved to Roland Petit's Ballet de Marseille as a principal, dancing leading Esmeralda in his Notre Dame de Paris. Over the next three years, she created roles in seven other Petit ballets including Le Guépard where she danced Angélique, and Le jeune homme et la mort where she partnered with Nicolas Le Riche. In 1997, she joined the San Francisco Ballet where she performed in various classical and contemporary works, taking the title role in Helgi Tómasson's Giselle (1999). There, she paired with the Frenchman, Cyril Pierre.

"I love to do bad stuff! I don't want to get typecast in goody roles." (Lucía Lacarra, 2001)

In 2002, Lacarra moved to Munich where she became a principal with the Bayerisches Staatsballett, partnering Cyril Pierre with whom she has participated in guest performances around the world. In recent years, she has created the roles of Princess Natalia and of Princess Odette in John Neumeier's Illusions – Like Swan Lake, Katharina in John Cranko's The Taming of the Shrew and Hippolyta/Titania in Neumeier's A Midsummer Night's Dream. She left the company in 2016 at the end of Ivan Liška's directorship. From 2007, she began a dancing partnership with Marlon Dino which led to their marriage in 2010. They divorced in 2017. Her partner is Matthew Golding (2019-present).

== Awards ==
In 2002, Lacarra received the Nijinsky Award. In 2003, at a gala in Moscow's Bolshoi Theatre she was awarded the Prix Benois de la Danse as best female dancer for her role of Tatjana in Cranko's Onegin. In 2011, at the World Ballet Stars Gala in St Petersburg, she was named the Dancer of the Decade.
