= Ana Laguna =

Spanish-Swedish ballet dancer (born 1954)

Ana Maria Laguna Caso
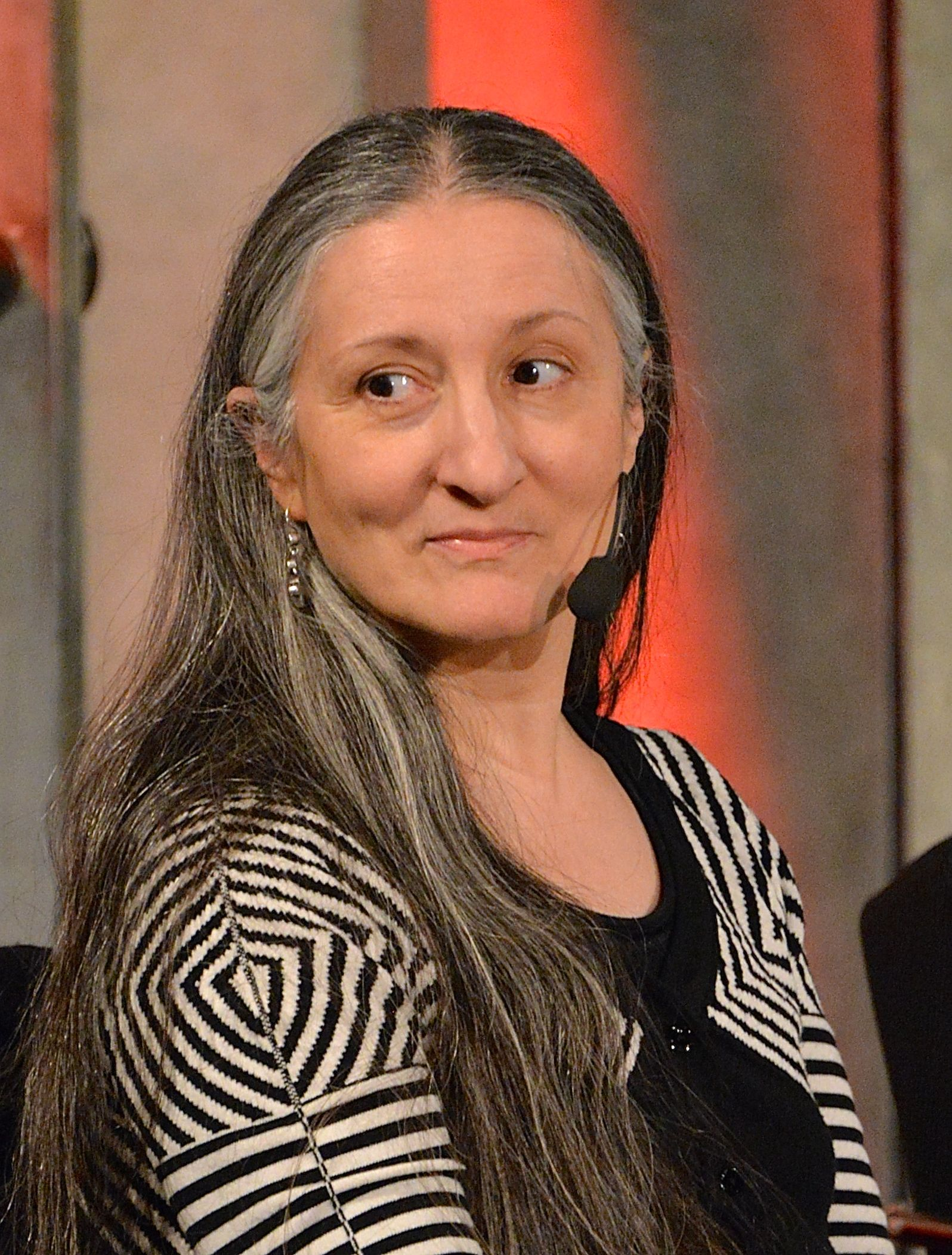
- Born: 16 May 1954 (age 72); Zaragoza, Spain
- Occupation: Ballerina

Ana Laguna (born 16 May 1954) is a Spanish-Swedish ballet dancer, court dancer and professor. She has danced throughout the world with such legends as Rudolf Nureyev and Mikhail Baryshnikov earning prizes for her performances from France, Italy, Monaco, Russia, Spain, Sweden and the United States.

== Biography ==
Ana Maria Laguna Caso was born 16 May 1954 in Zaragoza, Spain. Laguna grew up in Spain, beginning her ballet studies with Maria de Avila and by age eighteen was dancing at the Real Ballet de Cámara (The Royal Chamber Ballet). In 1973, she was offered work at the Cullberg Ballet in Sweden and was soon starring in many productions of the company. Her breakthrough performance to international recognition occurred in the 1976 production of St. George and the Dragon by the choreographer Mats Ek, whom she later married. In the 1980-1981 season, she performed with Nederlands Dans Theater, but returned to Cullberg for the opportunity to dance in two works she had long coveted, Sonate à Trois by Béla Bartók and choreographed by Maurice Béjart and Miss Julie by Ture Rangströn and choreographed by Birgit Cullberg. Though she had only two and a half weeks to learn Miss Julie, her performance with Rudolf Nureyev was one of her career highlights. Other high-profile roles include the title role in Ek's Giselle (1982), which was created by him for her and for which she also received the French Video Dance Prize for the best interpretation of Giselle in a TV version. Carmen was another of the dancer's favorite roles to perform for which she won an Emmy Award.

In 1993, she left Cullberg's company and began working independently. In 2001, her performance of Andromaque earned critical acclaim. She has danced throughout the world in performances with Mikhail Baryshnikov and worked in many productions including film, television and live dance, as well as serving as a choreographic assistant with a variety of companies and countries such as Nederlands Dans Theater and the Spanish National Dance Company, as well as with her husband. She has worked as a professor, on the Swedish National Council for Dance Education, and in 2006 was the first dancer outside the Royal Ballet to be appointed as an official Court Dancer.

== Awards ==
- France Video Dance Prize (1983) for Giselle
- Swedish Carina Ari Medal (1987)
- Spanish National Dance Award (1990)
- Monegasque Nijinski Lifetime Achievement Prize (2006)
- Swedish Royal Court Dancer (2006)
- Spanish Gold Medal for Merit in Fine Arts (2010)
- Italian 42nd Positano Leonide Massine lifetime achievement dance prize (2014)
- Russian Prize Benois-Moscow Miassine-Positano (2015)

== Filmography ==
- Speak Up! It's So Dark (1993)

=== Television ===
- Giselle (1982) (TV Movie)
- Svansjön (1990) (TV Movie)
- Carmen (1994) (TV Movie)
- Place (2009) (TV Movie)
- Gammal och dörr (2012) (TV Movie)

== Sources ==
- Snodgrass, Mary Ellen (8 June 2015). The Encyclopedia of World Ballet. Rowman & Littlefield Publishers. ISBN 978-1-4422-4526-6.
