= Rocío Molina Cruz =

Spanish flamenco dancer and choreographer (born 1984)

Rocío Molina
- Born: Rocío Molina Cruz; 1984 (age 41–42); Torre del Mar, Spain
- Occupations: Dancer; choreographer
- Awards: National Dance Award (2010); Silver Lion, Venice Biennale (2022)

Rocío Molina Cruz (born 1984), known as Rocío Molina, is a Spanish flamenco dancer (bailaora) and choreographer. She won Spain's National Dance Award in the performance category in 2010, and in 2022 she became the first flamenco artist to receive the Silver Lion of the Venice Biennale's dance festival. An associate artist of the Théâtre national de Chaillot in Paris, she has created works including Caída del cielo (2016), Grito pelao (2018), made with the singer Sílvia Pérez Cruz, Carnación (2022) and Calentamiento (2025).

== Early life and training ==
Molina was born in 1984 in Torre del Mar, a coastal town in the municipality of Vélez-Málaga, the daughter of a cook and a housewife. She first danced at the age of three, trained in Málaga and continued her studies at the Real Conservatorio de Danza in Madrid. She joined the company of María Pagés in 2001, making her first choreography for its show Las cuatro estaciones, and finished at the conservatory in 2002; at 21 she presented Entre paredes, her first work as a creator, and in 2011 she received the gold medal of the province of Málaga.

== Career ==
At the 2006 Festival de Jerez, Molina premiered El eterno retorno, a work inspired by texts by Friedrich Nietzsche with musical direction by Juan Carlos Romero, stage direction by Pepa Gamboa and the participation of Teresa Nieto and Pasión Vega; that year she also presented Turquesa como el limón, shown at Madrid's Teatro Pradillo, and won the outstanding dancer award at the Certamen de Coreografía de Danza Española y Flamenco and the Flamenco Hoy critics' prize for breakthrough dancer. Almario followed in 2007 and Cuando las piedras vuelen in 2009. Further works included Oro viejo (2008), Vinática (2010), Danzaora y vinática (2011), Afectos (2012) and Bosque Ardora (2014).

On 30 November 2010, the Ministry of Culture awarded Molina the National Dance Award in the performance category, with the creation prize going to Àngels Margarit; the jury cited "her contribution to the renewal of flamenco art and her versatility and strength as a performer". At 26 she was the youngest flamenco dancer to receive the award and the first winner from Málaga, and The New York Times had included her among the world's best dancers in 2009; months before the prize, Mikhail Baryshnikov had knelt at her feet after one of her performances in New York.

The Théâtre national de Chaillot in Paris first presented Molina in 2008 with Mujeres, and she returned with Cuando las piedras vuelen in 2009 and the solo Danzaora at the theatre's first Biennale d'art flamenco in 2013; at the second edition, in March 2015, she danced alongside hip-hop dancer Honji Wang in Sébastien Ramirez's Fealhikum and revived Bosque Ardora. An associate artist of Chaillot from the 2015–2016 season, she presented two public improvisations in its Grand Foyer, created Caída del cielo there in November 2016, took part in the third Biennale d'art flamenco in 2017 with Afectos, alongside the singer Rosario La Tremendita, and in the fourth, in 2020, with Impulso, a performance evening with guest artists. In 2015 she won the Max Award for best choreography.

=== Caída del cielo ===
Caída del cielo earned Molina the 2017 Max Awards for best female dance performer and best choreography. In October 2017 she performed it in London, as Fallen from Heaven, at the Barbican as part of the Dance Umbrella festival; The Guardian's reviewer wrote that in the work Molina "pushes herself and her language to sexual and theatrical extremes". The performance won her the Outstanding Female Modern Performance award at the British National Dance Awards for 2018, presented by The Critics' Circle in February 2019, the first time a flamenco artist won one of the awards.

=== Grito pelao ===
Molina premiered Grito pelao at the Festival d'Avignon in July 2018, a collaboration with the singer Sílvia Pérez Cruz and dramaturgy by Carlos Marquerie; the autobiographical piece dealt with her wish to become a mother, she performed it pregnant after in vitro fertilisation, and her mother, Lola Cruz, also appeared on stage. The premiere ended in an ovation. At the 2019 Max Awards, held in Valladolid, Grito pelao won the award for best dance show and Pérez Cruz collected the one for best musical composition; Molina, who did not attend the ceremony, dedicated the prize "to all mothers".

In January 2022 the Venice Biennale announced that Molina would receive its Silver Lion for dance; she learned of the award while travelling to the Festival de Nîmes, where she was to present Al fondo riela. On 27 July she presented the world premiere of Carnación, with the singer Niño de Elche, at the festival; writing in El País, Roger Salas reported that most of the audience stood and roared its approval. In December 2022 Spain's Council of Ministers awarded her the Gold Medal of Merit in the Fine Arts on the proposal of the culture minister, Miquel Iceta. In 2023 she won the Talía Award for best female dance performer for Vuelta a Uno, the closing piece of her trilogy about the guitar, at the awards' first edition, held at Madrid's Teatro Español.

Calentamiento premiered at Madrid's Centro de Danza Matadero in November 2025. At the fourth Talía Awards, held at the Teatros del Canal in May 2026, it swept the dance categories, winning best female dance performer and best choreography for Molina and best dance show.

== Personal life ==
Molina lives and works at La Aceitera, a farmhouse and studio in Bollullos de la Mitación, in the province of Seville. She has a daughter, Juana, born after in vitro fertilisation, and has spoken publicly about raising her as a single mother. She identifies as a lesbian, and appears every year in El Mundo's list of Spain's most influential LGBTI people.
