= Niño Ruven =

Spanish bassoonist

- Born: Ruven Jiménez Urbano; 25 March 1997 (age 29); Doña Mencía, Spain
- Education: University of Córdoba, Spain
- Occupations: Musician, bassoonist, composer, music director, research
- Musical career
- Genres: New flamenco, classical music
- Instruments: Bassoon, tenoroon, duduk
- Years active: 2011–present
- Website: www.ninoruven.com

Ruven Jiménez Urbano (Doña Mencía, 1997), known by his stage name Niño Ruven, is a Spanish musician and composer specialized in flamenco. He has established himself as one of the leading and innovative bassoonists of his generation, being the creator and the only worldwide exponent of the flamenco bassoon.

== Biography ==
Niño Ruven was born in Doña Mencía, south of Spain, on 25 March 1997, although he has resided in the city of Lucena for a good part of his life. His stage name comes from the way his family has always referred to him. He debuted as a soloist at thirteen, moment in which he began to compose his first works. His artistic sensitivity can be appreciated in several recitals and competitions related to the classical world, from which he will gradually move away. In 2014, he obtained his first recognition, the Special Jury Award of the 1st Seville Double Reed Society Competition, awarded for his «outstanding performance and musical talent». In 2016, an American publisher specialized in double reed instruments published his compositional work as "something totally different, original and challenging". He said goodbye to everything which is considered to be orthodox that year and started an unprecedented enterprising career in the history of music, combining both facets with the fascinating world of flamenco.

=== 2006–2016: Artistic beginnings ===
He began his musical learning at the age of nine in the Conservatory of Music in Lucena, where he had his first encounter with the bassoon. He assures in several interviews that he did not know it previously and that he has always thought that the instrument chose him instead. During this decade, he learned with numerous instrumental chamber formations and orchestras from all over the national territory. In 2015, he finished his professional studies as one of the winners of the Germán Romero Bellido Award, with one of the best records in his year, and continued his higher studies in the Conservatory of Music in Navarra, north of Spain, where he received honors in 2016.

=== 2017–2020: The Birth of Flamenco bassoon ===
On 2 June 2017 Al Toque del Fagot Flamenco came to light, a work in which Niño Ruven details the results of his research, creating a new playing technique to incorporate his instrument within the framework of flamenco for the first time. This research aimed to expose the particular architecture of this art, becoming the first methodology for flamenco instrumentalists related to aesthetics and the interpretation of the genre. After its publication, Trevco Music Publishing awarded him the distinction of Creator of the Flamenco Bassoon.

The singular sound of his flamenco bassoon was not heard until a month later, on 2 July 2017 through an intimate show at the Doña Mencía Castle in tribute to Camarón de la Isla who, according to the interpreter himself, made him «fall in love with flamenco». The culture councilor of said town presented the event explaining: «This invention grows out of his need for expression. It emerges as flamenco does, out of his own heart». A few days, after showing his innovation, he received one of the Cruzcampo Foundation awards that supports Southern Spain Talent. This recognition allowed him to collaborate in some symphonic shows as well as with the flamenco singer José Mercé.

On 30 August 2018 he continued the presentation of his flamenco bassoon in front of double reed instrumentalists, within the activities of the XLVII Congress of the International Double Reed Society in Granada. Bassoonists and oboists from all over the world saw him off with great acclaim and several international critics placed him as the ambassador of Andalusian culture and one of the most innovative bassoonists so far. The Australasian Double Reed Society specialized magazine, called "Reeding Matter", selected his participation as one of the most representative ones in these international conferences.

On 9 August 2019 he finished his debut at the Catedral of Cante during the LIX International Festival of Cante de las Minas in La Unión in front of the flamenco audience. With all this, he finished the production of the short film El Nacimiento del Fagot Flamenco (in English, The Birth of Flamenco Bassoon), also recorded at the Lucena Peña Flamenca —the third oldest one in the world— together with the guitarist Luis Calderito, where he summarizes his creative conception and how this original premiere was organised.

This audiovisual is the first one to be shared publicly, since during the subsequent years Niño Ruven made sure that no one heard his flamenco bassoon. In this way, as ExpoFlamenco puts it, «the young musician from Córdoba places this instrument in the front line of flamenco». On 14 May 2020, he performed a virtual show within the Música en Segura Festival in tribute to the victims of COVID-19. On 4 September he closed the cycle of concerts "Latidos Flamencos" at the Alcázar de los Reyes Cristianos in Córdoba with a show in homage to Enrique Morente. In addition, he has collaborated this month in the "Música para mis Oídos" programme in Canal Sur channel together with the singer Manuel Lobo.
