= Olga Pericet =

Spanish flamenco and contemporary dancer

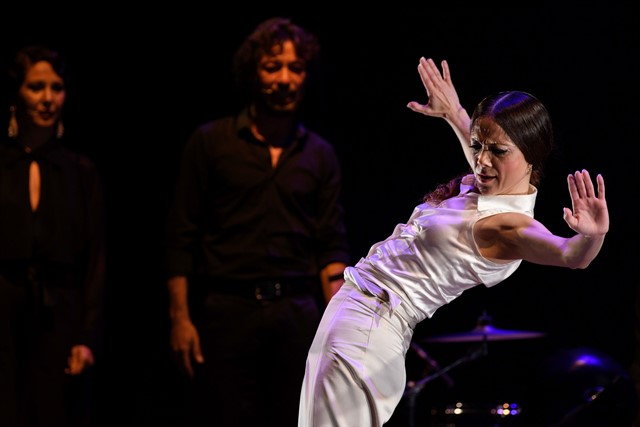
- Olga Pericet in 2018
- Born: 1975 (age 49–50); Córdoba, Spain
- Occupation(s): Dancer and choreographer
- Website: olgapericet.com/bio.html

Olga Pericet (born 1975) is a Spanish flamenco and contemporary dancer and choreographer.

She appeared in Flamenco de raíz (2012), which was nominated to five Goya Awards. In 2014 she won the Premio Ojo Crítico. In 2018 she was awarded by the Premio Nacional de Danza alongside Antonio Ruz.
