= Javier Latorre =

Spanish dancer and choreographer (born 1963)

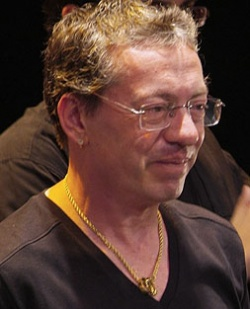
Javier Latorre

Javier Antonio García Expósito (known as Javier Latorre; born 1963, in Valencia, Spain) is a dancer and choreographer. He debuted at the age of 16 in the National Lyric Company. In 1979, he joined the Ballet Nacional de España, as soloist under the direction of Antonio Gades. After receiving an award as the Festival d'Avignon, he founded in 1988 in Cordoba the Ziryab Danza of which he was director, choreographer and dancer. He had considerable success with the show Hijas del Alba. A year later, he received three national awards at the Concurso Nacional de Arte Flamenco. In 1990, he toured with the show La fuerza del destinoall over Europe, and participated as a guest artist with Mario Maya in Diálogos del Amargo. He collaborated on Concierto flamenco para un marinero en tierra with Vicente Amigo before winning the first prize in dance at the Festival del Cante de las Minas in 1994.

== Choreography and interpretations ==
- 1989 "Hijas del Alba" Ziryab-Danza
- 1990 "La Fuerza del Destino" Ziryab-Danza
- 1990 "Buscando a Carmen". Serie TV Canal Sur
- 1994 "Lances del Arenal". Fundación Cristina Heeren
- 1995 "Movimiento Flamenco. Cía. Antonio Marquez
- 1995 "Guernica". Cía Antonio Canales
- 1997 "Omega". Enrique Morente.Lagartija-Nick
- 1997 "Musa Gitana. Cía. Paco Peña.
- 1998 "Poeta". Ballet Nacional de España
- 1998 "Ombra". La Fura dels Baus
- 1998 "Luz de Alma". Ballet Nacional de España
- 1998 "Cosas de Payos". Cía Andaluza de Danza
- 2000 "Ambivalencia". Cía. Javier Latorre
- 2000 "Requiem por Antonio". Cía Javier Latorre
- 2000 "5 Mujeres 5". Cía. Eva Yerbabuena
- 2001 "Pura Intención". Prod. Gran Teatro de Córdoba
- 2002 "Rinconete y Cortadillo". Compañía Javier Latorre
- 2003 "Andanzas". Cía. Somorrostro. Taller de Musics
- 2003 "Penélope". Ballet Español de Murcia
- 2003 "Inmigración". Cía. Angeles Gabaldón
- 2004 "El Loco". Ballet Nacional de España
- 2004 "Triana, en el nombre De La Rosa". Cía Javier Latorre
- 2004 "Tarantos, el musical". Prod. Focus
- 2005 "El Celoso". Ballet Español de Murcia
- 2006 "Por qué se frotan las patitas?". Musical Cine. Prod. Tesela P.C.
- 2006 "Inconnexus XXI". Cía. Somorrostro. Taller de Musics
- 2006 "Requiem por la Tierra". Cía. Paco Peña
- 2006 "Homenaje a Fosforito". Prod. Gran Teatro de Córdoba
- 2006 "Doña Francisquita". Zarzuela, Prod. Teatro Villamarta, Jerez
- 2007 "Homenaje al Concurso Nacional de Córdoba". Prod. Gran Teatro de Córdoba
- 2007 "4 Poetas en Guerra". Cía. Shoji Kojima
- 2007 "Femenino Plural". Cía. Angeles Gabaldón
- 2008 "Viva Jerez". Musical Prod. Teatro Villamarta, Jerez
- 2008 "El Bateo y De Madrid a París". Zarzuela Prod. Teatro de la Zarzuela
- 2008 "El Indiano". Cía. David Morales
- 2008 "Hijas del Alba". Ballet Español de Murcia
- 2009 "Fedra". Prod. Faraute-Macandé
- 2009 "Mi Ultimo Secreto". Cía. Mercedes Ruiz
- 2009 "Cálida Hondura". Cía. Daniel Navarro
- 2009 "De Córdoba a Cádiz" y "De Aquí y de Allá". Prod. Tablao El Cordobés"
- 2009 "Amor de Solana". Talleres coreográficos Centro Andaluz de Danza
- 2009 "5 Piezas". Talleres coreográficos Institut del Teatre, Barcelona
- 2009 "Flamenco, Flamenco". Musical cine. Carlos Saura
- 2009 "La Celestina". Cía. Shoji Kojima
- 2010 “El duende y el reloj”. Cía Javier Latorre
