= Israel Galván =

Spanish flamenco dancer (born 1973)

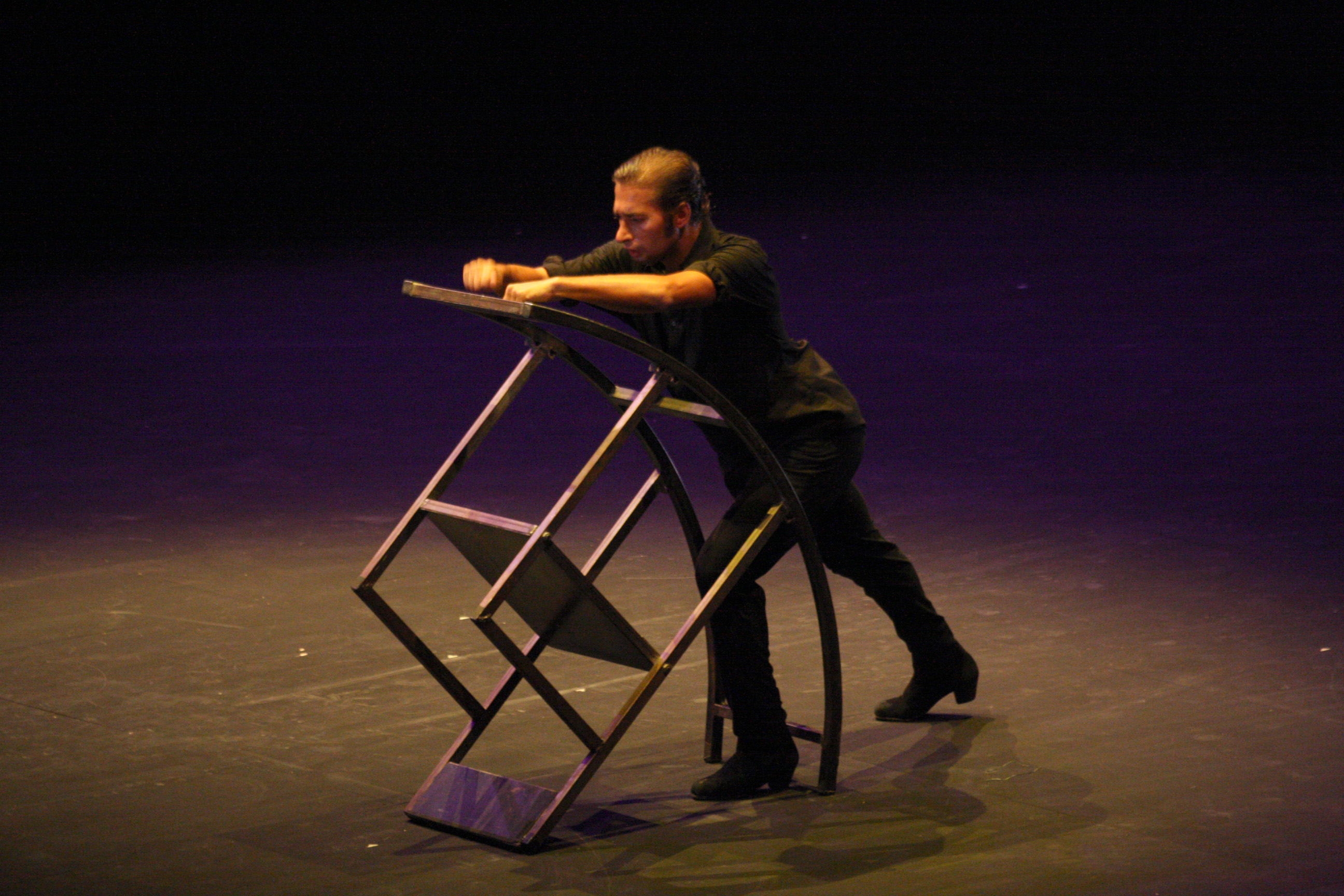
Israel Galván

Israel Galván Reyes (born 1973 in Seville) is a Spanish flamenco dancer (bailaor) and choreographer. He grew up learning and dancing with his father, the dancer José Galván, and his mother, Eugenia Reyes.

He became a celebrity in flamenco thanks to his dancing steps with complicated feet movements, showing rapid-fire footwork punctuated by moments of stillness and silence. His art is a kind of avantgarde flamenco. He has been awarded several dance prizes.

== Career ==
- In 1994 he joined the Compañia Andaluza de Danza directed by Mario Maya, and over the next decade won just about every top flamenco prize possible, including the Giradillo prize at Seville's flamenco Biennal, the Flamenco Hoy critics’ award for best dancer of the year, which he received in both 2001 and 2005. In the same year he also won Spain's national dance prize for the creative renewal of the Flamenco and in 2008 Premio Ciutat de Barcelona.
- After forming his own company in 1998 to create his first work Mira Los Zapatos Rojos, his reputation as a risk taker increased with each new work. Metamorphosis, his flamenco version of Kafka’s novelette; Arena, his dramatic and surprising choreography based on bull fighting; La Edad de Oro, in which he clings to references tracking the normal approaches and shuns "Age"; Tabula Rasa in which he turns the canon upside down to offer his conceptualist and baroque vision of flamenco; Solo, his most experimental and risky piece in which silence plays as music. And his personal and so impacting vision of «the Apocalypse», El Final de este estado de cosas redux, premiered at the Operahouse La Maestranza in Seville (Summer 2008).
- In each of his works, Israel Galván has collaborated with classic flamenco artists including Fernando Terremoto, Inés Bacan, Bobote, El Electrico, and contemporary flamenco innovators including Enrique Morente, Gerardo Núñez, Miguel Poveda, Diego Carrasco, Diego Amador, Alfredo Lagos, and other contemporary musicians.
- His work 'Lo Real/ Le Réel/ The Real' in 2013 was controversial: The standing ovation from the crowd that packed the Stasschouwburg in Amsterdam, was in marked contrast to the more conservative and hostile reaction to the premiere in Madrid. This was attributable to its treatment of a sensitive and emotive subject, the Nazi Holocaust against the gypsies. In addition, Galván's performance was controversial, his body expressing the role in a sort of body art or actionism of the body with certain self-inflicted violence. He changed his physique for this show, continuing that Kafkaesque process he undertook some years before with 'La metamorfosis'. And he's a victim of extermination. One who fights, who rebels, who swells with pride, who expresses his grief, who swears vengeance... but a victim who falls prey to death.
- In Madrid, on 27 June 2014, the world premiere of the genre-bordering work "Torobaka" (a word play from the Spanish words "toro" (bull) and "vaca" (cow as an allusion to the sacred cow in Indian culture) took place. Israel Galván appeared there together with Akram Khan, English choreographer and dancer with Bengali roots. Both were accompanied by polyphonic music with elements of Gregorian chorales, liturgical chants, Hindu songs, and the sounds of Anda Jaleo.
- Also in 2014, Israel Galván published his work "FLA.CO.MEN". On his website it is said to be a concert. In this piece, Galván deconstructs the flamenco and reunites it humorously. The music is partly free jazzy to experimental, but also traditional.
- Premios Max is the most important theatre award in Spain. In 2014, Israel Galván won the award in the 3 categories Coreografía, Interpretación and Espectáculo for his work 'Lo Real'. In 2015 he won the award in the category Bailarín Principal in his work FLA.CO.MEN. Rocío Molina and Olga Pericet also won the award.
- On 6 May 2017 Israel Galván performed the world premiere of "La Fiesta" in the Austrian city St. Pölten. In this creation nine dancing voices and singing bodies meet and give themselves in high notes to the energy of their meeting.
- In 2021, during a dialogue with theatre scholar Octavian Saiu, Galván said that he always wanted to be a dancer. He mentioned that he could still remember the "smell of the night" from the first flamenco show that he watched as a child.

== Awards ==
- 1995: Premio Vicente Escudero
- 1996: Premio Desplante
- 1996: Premio del II Concurso de Jóvenes Intérpretes
- 2001: Premio Flamenco
- 2023: Critics' Circle National Dance Award: Outstanding Male Modern Performance
- 2004: Premio Flamenco Hoy
- 2004: Giraldillo
- 2005: Premio Nacional de Danza
- 2005: Premio Flamenco Hoy
- 2006: Premio Flamenco Hoy
- 2006: Giraldillo
- 2007: Premio Ciutat de Barcelona Dansa
- 2008: Giraldillo
- 2009: Gran Prix de la Danse
- 2009: Madroño Flamenco
- 2011: Premio Max de las artes escénicas
- 2012: Medalla de oro de las Bellas Artes
- 2012: Bessie Award (USA)
- 2012: Premios Max
- 2014: Premis de la Crítica
- 2014: Premios Max
- 2014: Premio Flamenco Hoy
- 2015: Medalla de Andalucía
- 2015: National Dance Awards (UK)
- 2015: Ordre des Arts et des Lettres (France)
- 2015: Premios Max
- 2015: Designación por parte de la UNESCO para la realización del Manifiesto Oficial del Día Internacional de la Danza (29 April)
- 2015: Premio de la Crítica
- 2015: Clavel de la Prensa
- 2016: Critics' Circle National Dance Award: Special award for exceptional artistry
