= Spanish National Dance Company =

Performing group, based in Madrid

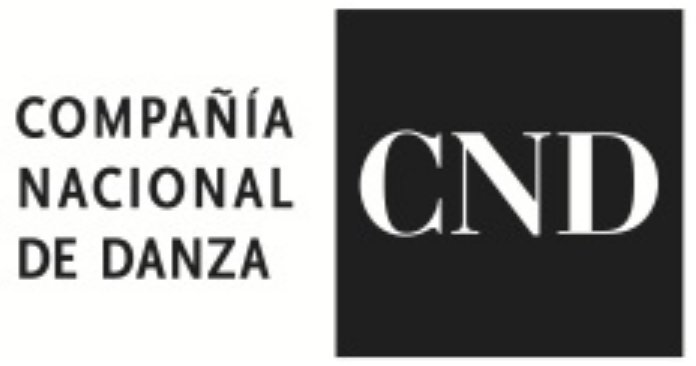

General information
- Name: Spanish National Dance Company
- Local name: Compañía Nacional de Danza
- Previous names: Ballet Nacional de España Clásico
- Year founded: 1979
- Principal venue: Spain
- Website: cndanza.mcu.es

Artistic staff
- Artistic Director: Muriel Romero

The Spanish National Dance Company (Spanish: Compañía Nacional de Danza, CND) was founded in 1979 under the name Ballet Nacional de España Clásico. Its first director was dancer Victor Ullate, followed by Maria de Avila, Ray Barra, Maya Plisetskaya, Nacho Duato (1990 – July 2010), Hervé Palito, José Carlos Martínez (December 2010 – 2019), and Joaquín de Luz.

In 2018 it was announced that the company would be moving to the railway museum, near the centre of Madrid.

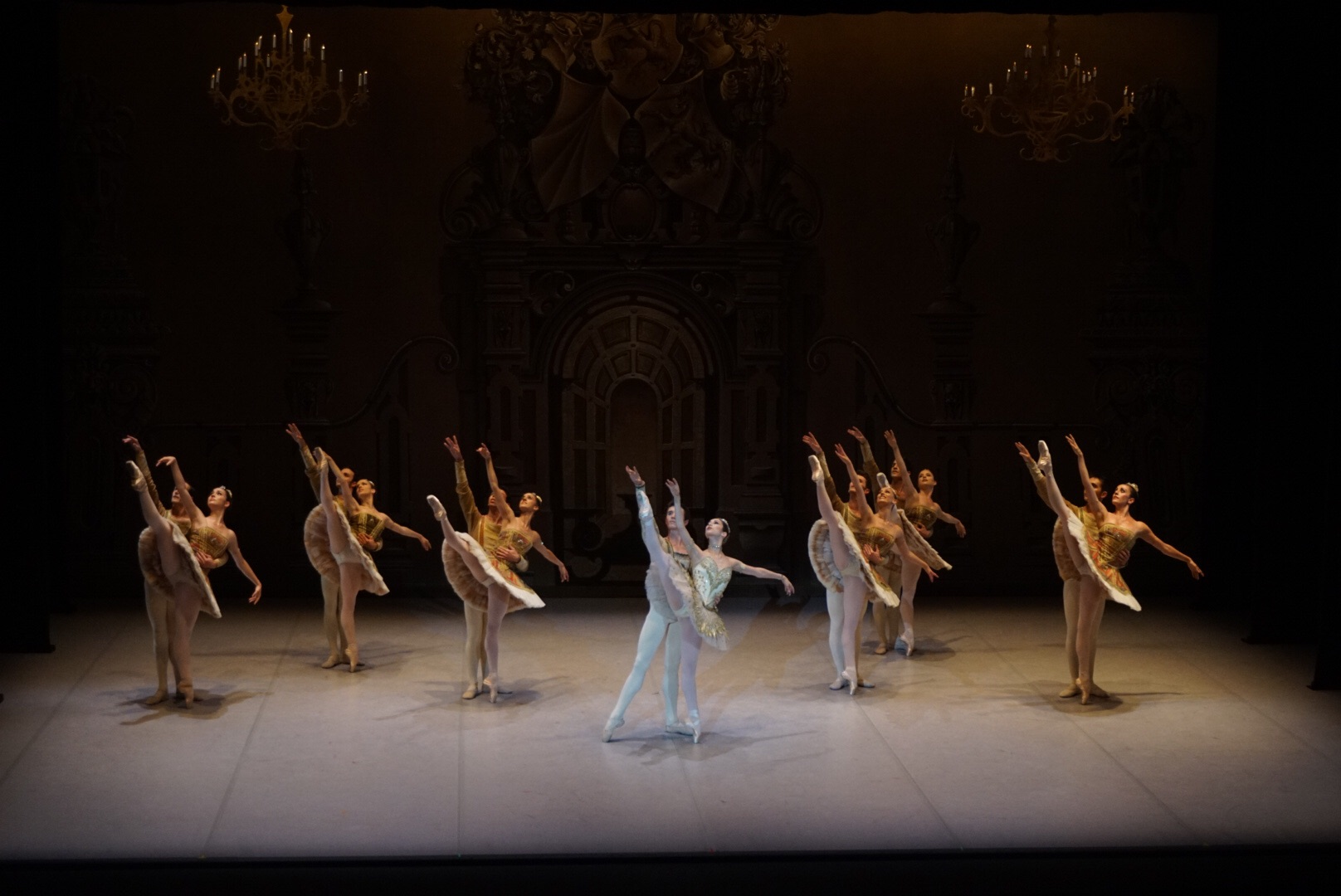
Spanish National Dance Company, 2015

== See also ==
- Ballet Nacional de España
- Teatro de la Zarzuela
