= Mario Maya =

Spanish flamenco dancer (1937–2008)

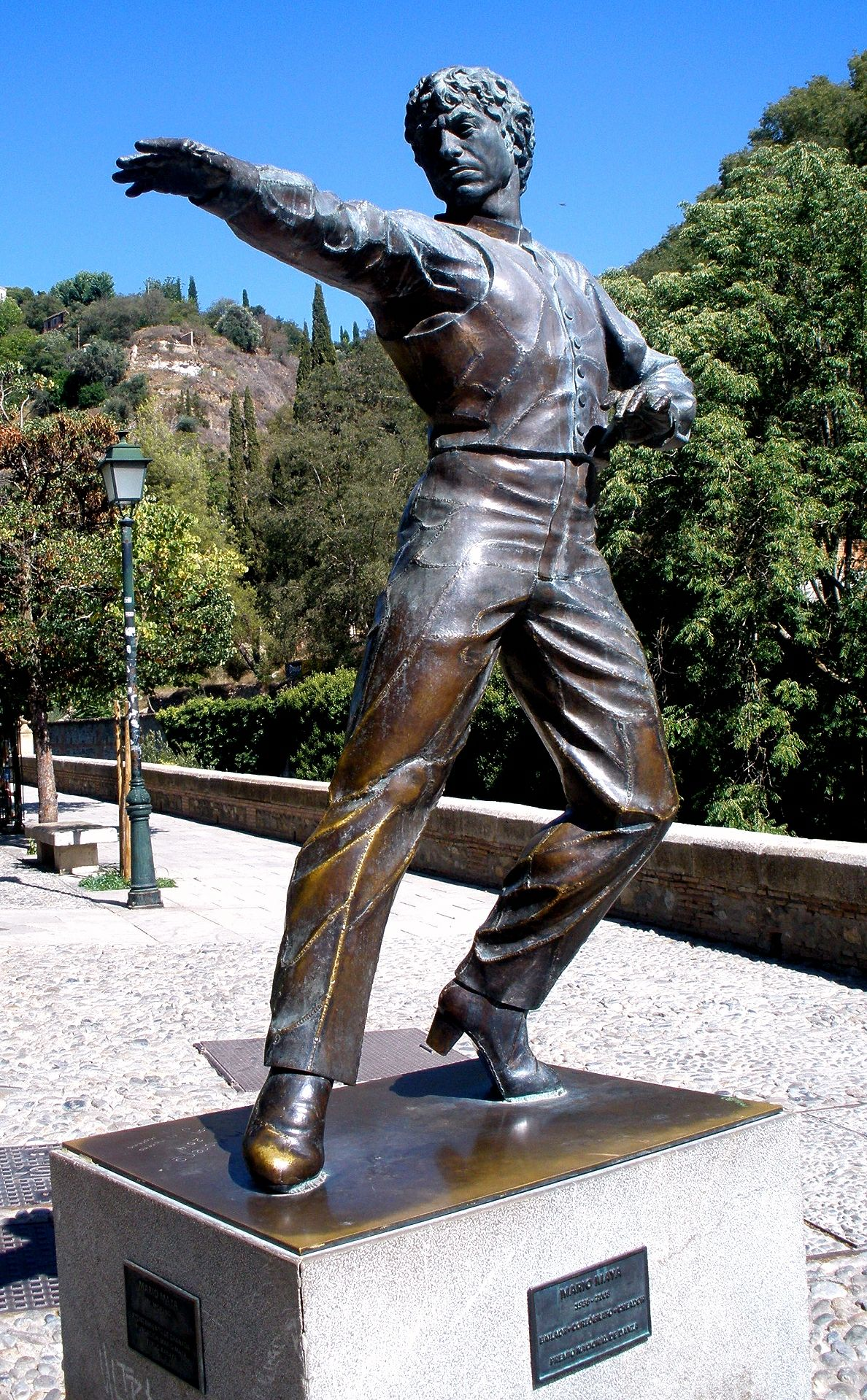
Statue of Maya in Granada

Mario Maya (1937 – September 27, 2008) was a Spanish flamenco dancer who directed the Andalusian Dance Company at the Andalusian Dance Centre.

== Biography ==
He was born in Córdoba in 1937 to a Romani family, but grew up in the Sacromonte of Granada.

He set up his own school in Seville in 1983 and, ten years later, presented his new company ‘Flamenco Mario Maya’ at the Alcalá Palace Theatre in Madrid. Between 1994 and 1997 he directed the Andalusian Dance Company at the Andalusian Dance Centre.

He took part in Carlos Saura’s 1995 film Flamenco. Some of his most important works include Ceremonial (1974), Camelamos Naquerar (1976), ¡Ay Jondo! (1977), El Amargo (1986), El Amor Brujo (1987) and Réquiem (1994).

Maya died of cancer in Seville on September 27, 2008.

== Awards ==
- National Dance Award (1971)
- Juana la Macarrona Award (1977)
- Andalusian Silver Medal (1986)
- National Dance Award (1992)
- Giraldillo (2008)

== See also ==
- List of dancers
