= Víctor Ullate =

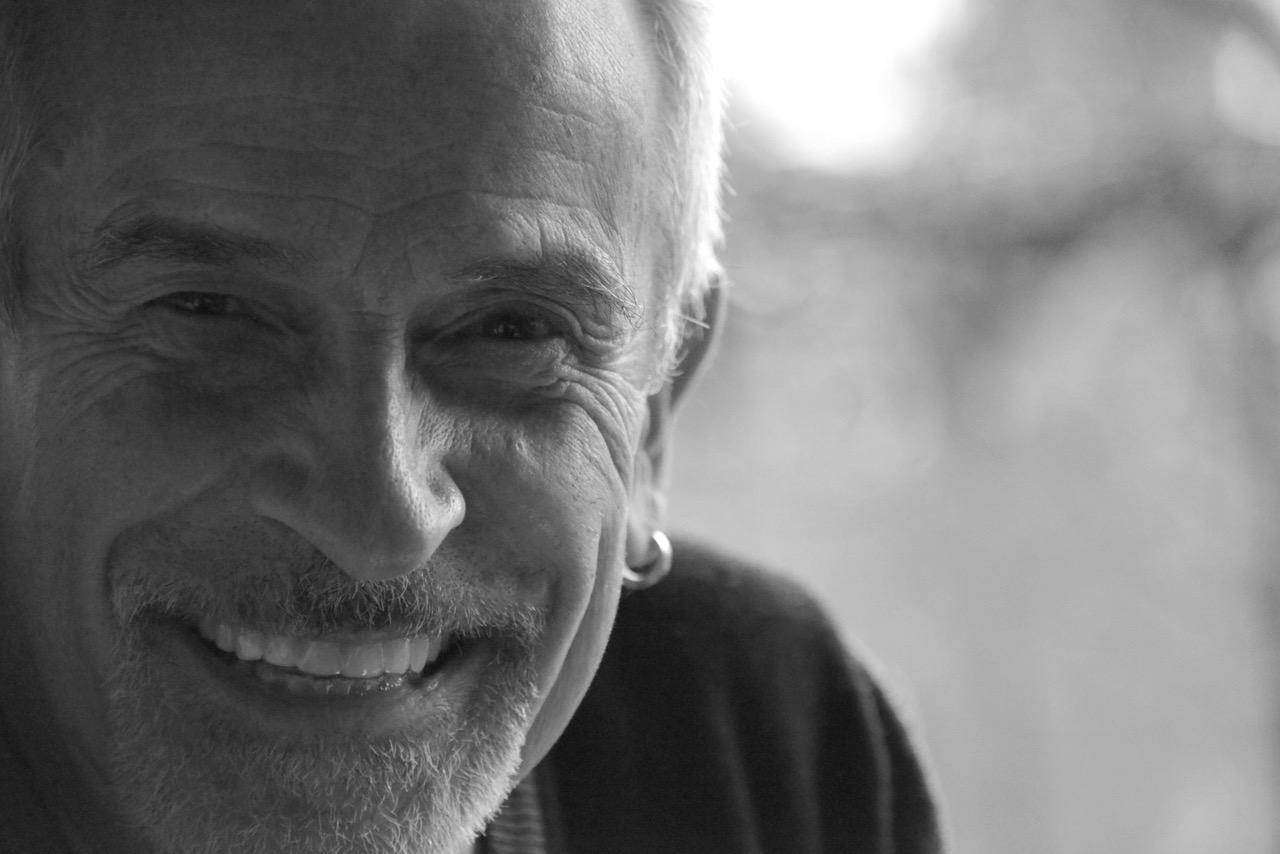
Víctor Ullate (2020)

Víctor Ullate (born 9 May 1947, Zaragoza, Spain) is a dancer, choreographer, ballet director and ballet teacher.

== Early life and education ==
He studied dance with María de Avila and at the École supérieure de danse de Cannes Rosella Hightower. He began his professional career in 1962 at the age of 15 in the company of the worldwide sought-after Spanish dancer Antonio Ruiz Soler.

== Career ==
=== Dancer ===
Three years later he was engaged by Maurice Béjart in his Ballet du XXième Siècle as a Principal Dancer. In the fourteen years of collaboration, Béjart created a number of roles for him, among others Ni fleurs, ni couronnes (1967), Offrande chorégraphique (1970), Nijinsky, Clown de Dieu (1971), Golestan (1973), I trionfi di Petrarca (1974); In Maurice Béjart's Gaîté parisienne (1978) an autobiographical ballet, he incorporated the role of Béjart.

=== Artistic Director and Choreographer ===
In 1979 the Spanish government commissioned him to found the country's first classical ballet company, today Compañia Nacional de Danza, of which he was artistic director for four years. In 1983 he opened his first own school, the Centro de Danza Víctor Ullate, and in 1988, with the support of the Ministry of Culture, he founded the Víctor Ullate Ballet. officially Spain's first private dance company, of which he has been director for more than 30 years.

He brought works by Maurice Béjart, George Balanchine, Hans van Manen, Nils Christe, Jan Linkens, Micha van Hoecke to the stage for his audiences in Spain, South America, Russia, and many European countries. He worked on classics of the repertoire including Les Sylphides, Giselle (after Jules Perrot) and Don Quixote (after Marius Petipa and Alexander A. Gorski), and premiered more than 40 of his own choreographies, often with reference to Spanish music and culture. Some of his most successful pieces choreographed for his own company are: El Amor Brujo (1994),Ven Que Te Tiente (1996), Jaleos(1996), Seguiriya(2000), La Inteligencia de Las Flores(2001), El sur(2005), Samsara(2006), Wonderland (2010), Carmen (2017), finally Antigona (2019, together with choreographer Eduardo Lao). His works are an original combination of classical and neoclassical ballet and flamenco, combining Spanish traditional and classical music.

=== Teacher ===
His efforts for individual advancement and the base of technical ability are met by the successes of such personalities as Angel Corella, Lucía Lacarra, Carlos Lopez, Joaquín De Luz, Tamara Rojo, Igor Yebra, Itziar Mendizabal, Sol León and José Carayol to name just a few of the most internationally known names of the ballet world. In 32 years many hundreds of pupils were starting into a professional dance career after graduating from his school. With the aim of enabling talents without financial resources a universal training for the dance profession and promoting classical ballet in all its forms of expression in Spain, he set up a foundation in 2000. After decades of fruitful work, he closed his ballet company in 2019., the other institutions finally fell victim to the cultural and political change in Spain in 2019–2020.

== Awards ==
Víctor Ullate has received numerous awards, including the Spanish Dance Prize (1989), the Medalla de Oro de las Bellas Artes (1996), he renowned Medalla Festival de Granada (1998), the Culture Prize of the City of Madrid in the ›Dance‹ category (2003), the »Autor-Autor« Award (2007), the MAX Honorary Award (2008), the MAX Award for his creation Wonderland as best dance production (2011). In 2013 he was awarded the »Gran Cruz de la Orden del Dos de Mayo« by the City of Madrid, and in 2016 the »Medalla de Oro al Mérito del Trabajo« by the Council of Ministers of Spain. In 2014 he was made an honorary member of the Academy of Performing Arts. In 2024 by the government of Aragon he was honored with the Medalla al Mérito Cultural de Aragón.

Víctor Ullate has three sons, Patrick Ullate, Víctor Ullate Roche and Josué Ullate.
