= La Danse (film) =

La Danse: The Paris Opera Ballet
- Theatrical release poster
- Directed by: Frederick Wiseman
- Release dates: 11 September 2009 (Venice); 7 October 2009 (France)
- Running time: 159 minutes
- Country: France
- Language: French

La Danse: The Paris Opera Ballet (French: La danse - Le ballet de l'Opéra de Paris) is a 2009 French documentary film directed by Frederick Wiseman. Besides aiming to reveal "how the company functions as an organic whole", the film follows the production of seven ballets by the Paris Opera Ballet. The ballets featured are:

- Genus (Wayne McGregor)
- La maison de Bernarda (Mats Ek)
- Le songe de Médée (Angelin Preljocaj)
- Paquita (Pierre Lacotte, after Joseph Mazilier and Marius Petipa)
- Orpheus und Eurydike (Pina Bausch)
- Roméo et Juliette (Berlioz) (Sasha Waltz)
- The Nutcracker (Rudolf Nureyev version)

The film proceeds without commentary, and there are no voiceovers.

Dancers from the Paris Opera Ballet who appear in the film include the étoiles Kader Belarbi, Jérémie Bélingard, Émilie Cozette, Aurélie Dupont, Mathieu Ganio, Dorothée Gilbert, Marie-Agnès Gillot, Manuel Legris, Nicolas Le Riche, Agnès Letestu, José Martinez, Hervé Moreau, Delphine Moussin, Clairemarie Osta, Benjamin Pech, Laetitia Pujol and Wilfried Romoli, and the premiers danseurs Yann Bridard, Stéphane Bullion, Isabelle Ciaravola, Nolwenn Daniel, Christophe Duquenne, Eve Grinsztajn, Mathias Heymann, Mélanie Hurel, Myriam Ould-Braham, Karl Paquette, Stéphane Phavorin, Stéphanie Romberg, Emmanuel Thibault and Muriel Zusperreguy.

== Reception ==
On the review aggregator website Rotten Tomatoes, the film holds an approval rating of 87%, based on 54 reviews, with an average rating of 7.6/10.
