= Danseur étoile =

Highest title for a ballet dancer

Danseur étoile (for men) or danseuse étoile (for women), literally "star dancer", is the highest rank a dancer can reach at the Paris Opera Ballet. It is equivalent to the title "principal dancer" used in English or to the title "primo ballerino" or "prima ballerina" in Italian.

The term étoile had been used to designate the best soloists of the Paris Opera Ballet since the 19th century, but it was only in 1940 that ballet master Serge Lifar decided to codify the title at the top of the company's hierarchy. Unlike all lower ranks in the Ballet (quadrille, coryphée, sujet, premier danseur), promotion to étoile does not depend on success in the annual competitive examinations. Dancers have to perform in leading roles, sometimes for many years, before they can be accorded the rank by the director of the Paris Opera, after nomination by the head of the ballet (directeur de la danse), in recognition of outstanding excellence and merit.

There is no specific rule regarding the nomination. Étoiles are usually chosen from among the premiers danseurs (the highest rank achievable through examinations), but exceptionally some dancers, such as Manuel Legris or Laurent Hilaire, have been promoted directly from the lower rank of sujet. The nominations were initially made in an administrative setting, then later backstage with the curtain closed. They now take place at the end of a performance, with the curtain open.

The title is conferred for life and is therefore kept after retirement, which is set at a maximum age of 42, like for all other dancers of the Paris Opera Ballet. The maximum number of active danseurs étoiles within the company, originally limited to four, has progressively increased over time and is nowadays set at eighteen. The institution has hosted several invited étoiles, though the invitation remains extremely rare and is reserved for principal dancers of notably high acclaim around the world.

== List of étoiles ==
By year of nomination (first date, second date corresponding to year of resignation or retirement):

- 1940–1960: Lycette Darsonval
- 1940–1944: Solange Schwarz–after the première of Entre deux rondes by Serge Lifar. The nomination occurred on stage (but with the curtain closed).
- 1941–1946: Serge Peretti first male "étoile"
- 1941–1956: Yvette Chauviré after the premiere of Istar by Serge Lifar
- 1946–1959: Michel Renault at age 18
- 1946–1949: Roger Fenonjois
- 1947–1951: Roger Ritz after the premiere of Palais de Cristal by George Balanchine
- 1947–1957: Christine Vaussard
- 1947–1960: Alexandre Kalioujny
- 1948–1957: Micheline Bardin
- 1948–1963: Max Bozzoni
- 1949–1957: Nina Vyroubova from outside the company
- 1950–1959: Liane Daydé at age 19
- 1952–1960: Madeleine Lafon
- 1953–1953: Jean Babilée nominated only 4 years after entering the company, left 9 months later to found his own company.
- 1953–1964: Youly Algaroff
- 1954–1967: Jean-Pierre Andréani
- 1955–1958: Peter van Dijk from outside the Company
- 1957–1961: Marjorie Tallchief from outside the Company
- 1956–1972: Claude Bessy
- 1957–1961: George Skibine
- 1958–1971: Josette Amiel
- 1961–1964: Flemming Flindt
- 1960–1977: Claire Motte
- 1961–1972: Attilio Labis after a performance of Pas de Dieux by Gene Kelly, called for by André Malraux
- 1961–1974: Jacquline Rayet after a performance of Giselle
- 1964–1986: Cyril Atanassoff
- 1964–1978: Christine Vlassi
- 1965–1983: Nanon Thibon
- 1966–1969: Jean-Pierre Bonnefous
- 1968–1983: Noëlla Pontois
- 1969–1989: Georges Piletta
- 1969–1983: Wilfride Piollet
- 1970–1980: Claudette Scouarnec from the Opéra Comique dance troupe
- 1971–1989: Jean-Pierre Franchetti
- 1971–1989: Michaël Denard
- 1972–1989: Patrice Bart
- 1972–1983: Ghislaine Thesmar
- 1972–1990: Jean Guizerix
- 1974–1980: Carolyn Carlson
- 1976–1980: Dominique Khalfouni
- 1977–1998: Charles Jude
- 1977–1992: Florence Clerc
- 1978–1993: Claude de Vulpian
- 1980–1988: Patrick Dupond
- 1981–1996: Jean-Yves Lormeaux
- 1981–1999: Élisabeth Platel
- 1982–1996: Monique Loudières
- 1983–1997: Françoise Legrée
- 1984–1989: Sylvie Guillem
- 1985–2001: Isabelle Guérin
- 1985–2007: Laurent Hilaire
- 1986–2009: Manuel Legris
- 1988–2005: Élisabeth Maurin
- 1989–2008: Kader Belarbi
- 1990–1999: Marie-Claude Pietragalla
- 1993–2001: Carole Arbo
- 1993–2001: Fanny Gaïda
- 1993–2014: Nicolas Le Riche
- 1997–2013: Agnès Letestu
- 1997–2010: José Martinez
- 1998–2015: Aurélie Dupont
- 2000–2008: Jean-Guillaume Bart
- 2002–2012: Clairemarie Osta
- 2002–2017: Laëtitia Pujol
- 2004–2018: Marie-Agnès Gillot
- 2004–2025: Mathieu Ganio
- 2005–2008: Wilfried Romoli
- 2005–2011: Delphine Moussin
- 2005–2016: Benjamin Pech
- 2006–2018: Hervé Moreau
- 2007–2023: Émilie Cozette
- 2007–2017: Jérémie Bélingard
- 2007–2026: Dorothée Gilbert
- 2009–2014: Isabelle Ciaravola
- 2009–present: Mathias Heymann
- 2009–2018: Karl Paquette
- 2010–2022 : Stéphane Bullion
- 2012–2018: Josua Hoffalt
- 2012–2025: Ludmila Pagliero
- 2012–2024: Myriam Ould-Braham
- 2013–2021: Eleonora Abbagnato
- 2013–2022: Alice Renavand
- 2014–present: Amandine Albisson
- 2015–2024: Laura Hecquet
- 2016–present: Germain Louvet
- 2016–present: Léonore Baulac
- 2017–present: Hugo Marchand
- 2018–present: Valentine Colasante
- 2020–present: Paul Marque
- 2021–present: Sae Eun Park
- 2022: François Alu
- 2023–present: Hannah O'Neill
- 2023–present: Marc Moreau
- 2023–present: Guillaume Diop
- 2024–present: Bleuenn Battistoni
- 2024–present: Roxane Stojanov
- 2026–present: Thomas Docquir
