= Stéphane Bullion =

French ballet dancer (born 1980)

Stéphane Bullion (born 8 April 1980) is a retired French Étoile dancer of the Paris Opera Ballet.

== Background ==
Born in Lyon, Bullion started dance lessons at the age of eleven and entered the Paris Opera Ballet School at fourteen (1994). He joined the corps de ballet in 1997. During his school years, he danced twice at the school annual performance (1996 and 1997), in Serge Lifar's Le Chevalier et la demoiselle and George Balanchine's Western Symphony. He became a Coryphée in 2001, Sujet in 2002 and Premier danseur in 2007.

He was appointed Étoile, the highest rank in the company, in 2010, after his performance as Solor in Rudolf Nureyev's version of La Bayadère. Bullion officially retired from the Paris Opera Ballet after a performance of Mats Ek's Another Place on 4 June 2022.

== Career ==
Bullion danced the Faun in Vaslav Nijinsky's L'après-midi d'un faune, based on Claude Debussy's Prélude à l'après-midi d'un faune, while still a Coryphée in 2001. He was chosen by Yury Grigorovich for the title role in Ivan the Terrible and made his debut on 6 January 2004. However, in late December 2003 Bullion had been diagnosed with testicular cancer. Three days after his debut as Ivan the Terrible he underwent surgery, followed by four months of chemotherapy. He returned to the stage during a tour to Japan in July 2004. In October 2004 he made his debut in the principal male role in Jerome Robbins' Glass Pieces. For the most part Bullion continued to be cast in leading villain roles in the Nureyev's versions of the classics (Abderam in Raymonda, Tybalt in Romeo and Juliet and Rothbart in Swan Lake). His promotion to Premier danseur in 2007 gave him access to romantic roles such as Armand in John Neumeier's The Lady of the Camellias, Jean de Brienne in Nureyev's Raymonda and Albrecht in Patrice Bart's version of Corrali-Perrot's Giselle. After reaching the status of Étoile he continued performing principal roles in the Nureyev repertoire, including Siegfried in Swan Lake, as well as Lucien d'Hervilly in Pierre Lacotte's Paquita.

A tall and powerful dancer, he was, from the beginning of his career, often chosen by choreographers to create or introduce their ballets to the Paris Opera Ballet's repertoire.

World premieres: AndréAuria (Edouard Lock - 2002), MC14/22, Ceci est mon corps (2004), Ananda in Siddharta (2009) (Angelin Preljocaj), Répliques (2009) and Sept mètres et de mi au-dessus des montagnes (2017) (Nicolas Paul), Eros in Psyché, (Alexei Ratmansky - 2011), Vaudémont (the prince) in The Nutcracker (Sidi Larbi Cherkaoui, Edouard Lock and Arthur Pita) in Iolanta-The Nutcracker directed by Dmitri Tcherniakov, 2016, Play (Alexander Ekman - 2017)

First interpreter at the Paris Opera Ballet: Morel (Proust or the heart's intermissions - Roland Petit- 2007), L’homme (The House of Bernarda - Mats Ek - 2008), l’Ame - (Third Symphony of Gustav Mahler - John Neumeier - 2009), Mikado (Kaguyahime - Jiří Kylián - 2010), Die Grosse Fuge and Die Verklärte Nacht (Anne Teresa de Keersmaeker- 2015), Polyphonia (Christopher Wheeldon- 2015), Titania's Cavalier A Midsummer Night's Dream (George Balanchine - 2017)

Stéphane Bullion was a favourite of choreographer Roland Petit (Proust or the Heart's Intermissions, Le Loup, L’Arlésienne, Le Jeune Homme et la Mort, Carmen, Notre-Dame de Paris), Angelin Preljocaj (MC14/22, Le Songe de Médée, Siddharta, Le Parc), Nicolas Le Riche (Caligula), John Neumeier (The Lady of the Camellias, The Third Symphony of Gustav Mahler) and others.

Acknowledged as a fine partner, he danced with guest ballerinas at the Paris Opera Ballet in Rudolf Nureyev's ballets: with Svetlana Zakharova from the Bolshoi Ballet in La Bayadère as Solor and in Swan Lake as Rothbart. He also partnered Maria Alexandrova from the Bolshoi Ballet in Raymonda as Abderam and Ulyana Lopatkina from the Mariinsky Ballet as Rothbart in Swan Lake. With the Lyon Opera Ballet, he danced Don José in Roland Petit's Carmen with Polina Semionova (American Ballet Theatre and Staatsballett Berlin).

International invitations: In 2007, French choreographer Jean-Guillaume Bart asked him to dance Conrad, the main role in Le Corsaire, for the premiere of his production of the ballet in Yekaterinburg (Russia). Additionally, as an international guest with various ballet companies, he was invited by choreographer Yury Grigorovich to dance Ivan in Ivan the terrible at the Mariinsky Theatre with the Kremlin Ballet in 2005. Other invitations included performing Jerome Robbins' In the Night in 2013 at the Teatro dell'Opera di Roma, where he also danced the main role in Le Parc by Angelin Preljocaj in 2016 and Roland Petit's Le Jeune Homme et la Mort in 2017. Bullion also toured with the Rome company in Le Jeune Homme et la Mort. In Austria, he danced Prince Siegfried in Rudolf Nureyev's Swan Lake at the Vienna State Opera in 2015 with Royal Ballet principal dancer Marianela Núñez.

French photographer Anne Deniau created a project around Stéphane Bullion dancing on a beach 24 hours in a row which resulted in a bilingual book and a film in 2012, 24 Hours in a Man's Life.

He is Chevalier of Arts and Letters

== Repertoire ==
Main roles (Paris Opera Ballet) :

- George Balanchine: Agon, Brahms-Schoenberg Quartet, Concerto Barocco, Jewels, The Four Temperaments, A Midsummer Night's Dream, Symphony in C, La Valse, Stravinsky Violin Concerto
- Patrice Bart: La Petite danseuse de Degas
- Pina Bausch: Orpheus und Eurydike, Rites of Spring
- Maurice Béjart: L'Oiseau de feu, Le Mandarin merveilleux, Boléro
- Kader Belarbi: Wuthering Heights
- Rafael Bonachela: AB [Intra]
- Sidi Larbi Cherkaoui, Edouard Lock and Arthur Pita: The Nutcracker in Iolanta-The Nutcracker directed by Dmitri Tcherniakov
- Carolyn Carlson: Signes
- Dimitri Chamblas and Boris Charmatz: À bras-le-corps
- John Cranko: Onegin
- Birgit Cullberg: Miss Julie
- Nacho Duato: White Darkness
- Jean Coralli and Jules Perrot: Giselle
- Mats Ek: Apartment, The House of Bernarda; Another Place
- Alexander Ekman: Play
- Yury Grigorovich: Ivan the Terrible
- Marco Goecke: Dogs Sleep
- Anne Teresa De Keersmaeker: Die Grosse Fuge, Verklärte Nacht
- Jiří Kylián: Doux Mensonges, Kaguyahime, Symphony of Psalms
- Pierre Lacotte: Paquita; The Red and the Black
- Sol León and Paul Lightfoot: Sleight of Hand
- Nicolas Le Riche: Caligula
- Serge Lifar: Les Mirages; Suite en blanc, Phèdre
- Édouard Lock: AndréAuria
- Michel Fokine: Petrouchka
- Kenneth MacMillan: L'histoire de Manon, Mayerling
- José Martinez: Children of Paradise
- Vaslav Nijinsky: L'après-midi d'un faune
- John Neumeier: The Lady of the Camellias; The Third Symphony of Gustav Mahler
- Rudolf Nureyev: La Bayadère; Cinderella; Don Quixote; Swan Lake; The Sleeping Beauty; Raymonda; Romeo and Juliet
- Nicolas Paul: Répliques, Sept mètres et demi au-dessus des montagnes
- Roland Petit: L'Arlésienne; Proust or the Heart's Intermissions; Le Loup; Le Jeune Homme et la Mort; Carmen; Notre-Dame de Paris (The Hunchback of Notre-Dame)
- Angelin Preljocaj: Le Parc, Le Songe de Médée; MC 14/22 "ceci est mon corps"; Siddharta
- Alexei Ratmansky: Psyché
- Jerome Robbins: Afternoon of a faun; Glass Pieces; In the Night, Fancy Free
- Christopher Wheeldon: Polyphonia

== Filmography ==
Documentary

- Serge Lifar Musagète - Dominique Delouche, 2005
- Serge Peretti: Le Dernier Italien - Dominique Delouche (DVD Etoiles pour l'exemple n°3)
- La Danse (documentary directed by Frederick Wiseman), 2009
- Agnès Letestu: L'Apogée d'une étoile - Marlène Ionesco, 2013 (Delange Productions)

Movie

- Aurore - Nils Tavernier, 2006
- 24 hours in a man's life - Anne Deniau, 2012

Paris Opera Ballet

- MC14/22 "Ceci est mon corps" - Angelin Preljocaj (Opus Arte-2004)
- Proust ou les intermittences du cœur - Roland Petit (Bel Air Classiques-2007)
- La Dame aux camélias - John Neumeier (Opus Arte-2008)
- Hommage à Jerome Robbins- Jerome Robbins (Bel Air Classiques-2008)
- Siddharta - Angelin Preljocaj (Arthaus Muzik-2010)
- Caligula - Nicolas Le Riche (Idéale Audience-2011)
- Third Symphony of Gustav Mahler - John Neumeier (CLC Productions-2013)
- L'histoire de Manon - Kenneth MacMillan (2015)
- Anne Teresa De Keersmaeker à l'Opéra de Paris - Die Grosse Fuge & Verklärte Nacht (Idéale Audience-2015)
- Iolanta - The Nutcracker directed by Dmitri Tcherniakov, choreography by Sidi Larbi Cherkaoui, Edouard Lock and Arthur Pita (Bel Air Media-2016)
- A Midsummer Night's Dream - George Balanchine (Telmondis-2017)
- Play - Alexander Ekman (Bel Air Media, 2017)
- Thierrée/Shechter/Pérez/Pite - The Male Dancer d'Iván Pérez (Bel Air Media 2018)
- Hommage à Jerome Robbins - Fancy Free (Telmondis, 2018)
- Gala inaugural des 350 ans de l'Opéra de Paris - Carmen (Roland Petit) and The Lady of the Camellias (John Neumeier) - pas de deux with Eleonora Abbagnato (Bel Air Media, 2018)
- Gala d'ouverture de la saison de danse - "In The Night" (Jerome Robbins) (Opéra National de Paris, 2021)
- Notre-Dame de Paris - Roland Petit - (Telmondis and Opéra National de Paris, 2021)
- Roméo et Juliette - Rudolf Nureyev - (La Belle Télé and Opéra National de Paris, 2021)
- Le Rouge et le Noir - Pierre Lacotte (Telmondis, 2021)
