= Andrey Klemm =

Russian born ballet dancer and teacher

Andrey Eduardovich Klemm (Андрей Эдуардович Клемм) (born 1967) is a Russian born ballet dancer, ballet teacher, author and choreographer.

== Early life and education ==
Klemm was born in Moscow on April 30, 1967. His father, Eduard Stanislavovich Klemm, was an architect and his mother Alexandra Pavlovna Klemm worked in the television industry in Moscow.

Andrey Klemm began his ballet training at the age of nine at the Bolshoi Ballet Academy in Moscow and moved to the school with permanent residence at the age of ten.

While there, Klemm studied for many years with Professor Alexander Bondarenko among other notable teachers, and was awarded a Red diploma of special distinction upon graduation in 1985.

== Career ==
After graduation Klemm was invited by director Natalia Kasatkina to join The Moscow Classical Ballet, During his tenure, he was promoted to soloist and danced with the company until 1994. Klemm continued his studies with ballet master Naum Azarin-Messerer, also from 1992 to 1994 Klemm studied to be a ballet teacher at The Russian Institute of Theatre Arts (GITIS).

From 1994-1997 he danced at the Bonn Opera House (Oper der Stadt Bonn) with Valery Panov as director.

In 1996 Klemm began teaching master classes in major cities in the United States. Following this time in 1997, he joined the Berlin State Opera (Staatsballet Berlin (formerly Deutsche Staatsoper Opera) as a dancer and then as a teacher and ballet master from 2001-2007. Coinciding with this time period from 2001 through 2006, Klemm successfully completed professorship studies at the Natalia Nesterova University of Moscow with Professor Anatoly Borzov.

In 2007, Klemm was appointed ballet professor at the Opera National de Paris. In 2008 Mikhail Baryshnikov attended a series of classes with Klemm.

Klemm has served as a regular guest teacher at The Bolshoi Theater, Stuttgart Ballet, The Saxon State Opera in Dresden, Dusseldorf Opera House, The Vienna State Opera, The Dutch National Ballet, The Tokyo City Ballet, Tokyo Ballet, The Royal Ballet in London, as well as at the performing arts theater Tanztheater Wuppertal Pina Bausch. He appeared as one of the ballet masters in the film “Pina” which is a 2011 German 3D documentary film about the contemporary dance choreographer Pina Bausch. When Klemm taught class to her company at the Tanztheater Wuppertal in Germany, Pina Bousch frequently enjoyed observing.

Since 2014 Klemm has been a ballet master at the International Ballet Competition Youth America Grand Prix.

In 2018 and 2019 Klemm taught at The World Ballet Festival in Tokyo Japan which was organized by NBS. He continued to perform occasionally with The Paris Opera Ballet, and for choreographers as he did in Mats Ek's “Bernarda's House”, With the Paris Opera Ballet Klemm performed as Monsieur Duval in John Neumeier's Lady of the Camellias, 2018–19, He performed Pierre Lacotte's Paquita for the Bolshoi tour as well as several others works.

In October 2021 Klemm performed again with the Paris Opera Ballet dancing the role of Le Marquis de la Mole in Le Rouge et le Noir of Pierre Lacotte.

Klemm has created many ballet class DVDs as well as Youtube ballet classes. Some of his classes are streamed on World ballet class.

Throughout the course of the COVID pandemic Klemm produced twelve live workshops which were streamed online for students in many different countries. In 2020 his ”Le cours d’après” class was filmed on the Passerelle Leopold Sedar-Senghor bridge in Paris with Etoiles of Paris Opera, Hugo Marchand and Paul Marque and premiere danseuse Sylvia Saint-Martin. Louis Lancien, also from the Paris Operawas the piano accompanist.

During the pandemic, Klemm also created classes online for the Royal Ballet of London. These were recorded by The Royal Ballet and used exclusively for their dancers.

In August 2021 Klemm also created and taught classes for Le Grand Stage a classical dance workshop in Paris. He has brought these workshops to many cities in Europe, and to Japan and China. Klemm has also taught masterclasses for Staatsballet Berlin, Les Ballets de Monte-Carlo, Ballet Russo Barcelona and Stage de danse Mansle and Athens Ballet school. He has been a Guest Ballet teacher for The Royal Opera as well as La Scala di Milano. He continues as a ballet professor at The Paris Opera Ballet.

For the past several years Klemm has been part of the Paris Opera's "Tous à l'opéra!" program.

Klemm's repertoire includes the ballets of Marius Petipa, Lev Ivanov, Natalia Kasatkina, Vladimir Vassiliev, Pierre Lacotte, Valerie Panov, Vamos, George Balanchine, Maurice Bejart, Rudolf Nureyev, Roland Petit, Kenneth McMillan, Alberto Alonso, Patrice Bart, William Forsythe, Vladimir Vassilyov, Vladimir Malachov, John Neumeier, and Mats Ek.

== Publications ==
- Classe, first published in France in 2018
- Classe was also published in Russia in 2020, it was also printed in English with the name Ballet Class

== Videography ==
- Masterclasses with Andrey Klemm, streamed on worldballetclass, 2020.
- Masterclass with Andrey Klemm on DVD produced by Andrey Klemm in 2009
- Little Ballerina on DVD produced in 2010 by Andrey Klemm.
- Sur Les Pointes with Etoile Isabelle Ciaravola on DVD produced by Andrey Klemm in 2013.
- Ballet class with Andrey Klemm and Amandine Albisson on DVD produced by Andrey Klemm in 2015.
- Lesson at the Opera Paquita variation Andrey Klemm and Antoine Kircher on DVD produced by Andrey Klemm in 2018
- Class at the Opera with Hannah O’Neill produced by Andrey Klemm in 2018 on DVD, streamed by worldballetclass 2020.
- Ballet Class In Paris Opera- Andrey Klemm produced by Andrey Klemm in 2019.
- Masterclass with Andrey Klemm for Rostov Theatre Ballet Company, Second Ballet festival of Olga Spesivtseva
- Andrey Klemm Lockdown Ballet Class with Chloe Reveillon for worldwide ballet class 2020.
- Le cours d' apres ballet class produced by Andrey Klemm in Paris France ( 2020.)

== CD’s; all produced by Andrey Klemm ==
- Ballet Class Music Volume 1 Produced in Paris, France (2013)
- Ballet Class music 2 Produced in Paris France (2015)
- Ballet Class Music 3 Produced in Paris France (2017)
- Ballet Class music 4 Le cours d'après Produced in Paris France (2020

== Choreography ==
- Clara danse sur “ Casse-Noisette”, La March Prodiges
- Clara danse sur “La Moldau”- Prodiges 3
