= Irina Laurenova =

Irina Laurenova is a Belarusian ballerina. She was born in Ros', Belarus and studied at the Minsk Ballet Academy. She has been dancing with the Royal Swedish Ballet since 2004 and in 2007 was appointed second soloist. Prior to her employment in Sweden, Laurenova worked with the Bolshoi Ballet in Poznań, Poland, the Ballet Theatre in Minsk and the Ballet Theatre of Trier, Germany. In addition, she has performed as a guest dancer in appearances and festivals throughout the world, including: Belgium, Canada, China, France, Hong Kong, Japan, the Netherlands, Spain, Switzerland and Thailand.

She has played many roles throughout her career, including performances in works such as The Firebird, Don Quixote, Swan Lake, and the ballet based on the novel Zorba the Greek, among many others. At the Royal Ballet, her main roles have been as Anitra / Ingrid in John Neumeier's choreography of Peer Gynt, as Gamzatti in La Bayadere choreographed by Natalia Makarova, in Rättika by Mats Ek, and as the Snow Queen in Pär Isberg's choreography of The Nutcracker. In Isberg's Nutcracker, she has also performed the role of Aunt Brown Other starring roles have been as Kristin in Miss Julie choreographed by Birgit Cullberg, as Anna Soifa Ramström in Gustav III by choreographer Patrice Bart, as the Bird of Paradise in Pär Isberg's choreography of the ballet based on the story of Pippi Långstrump, in Before Nightfall with Nils Christe's choreography, in Kazimirs Colours choreographed by Mauro Bigonzetti, in Cendrillon by choreographer Jean-Christophe Maillot, in Degenerator (choreographed by Gunnlaugur Egilsson, and many others.
