= Laetitia Pujol =

French ballet dancer (born 1975)

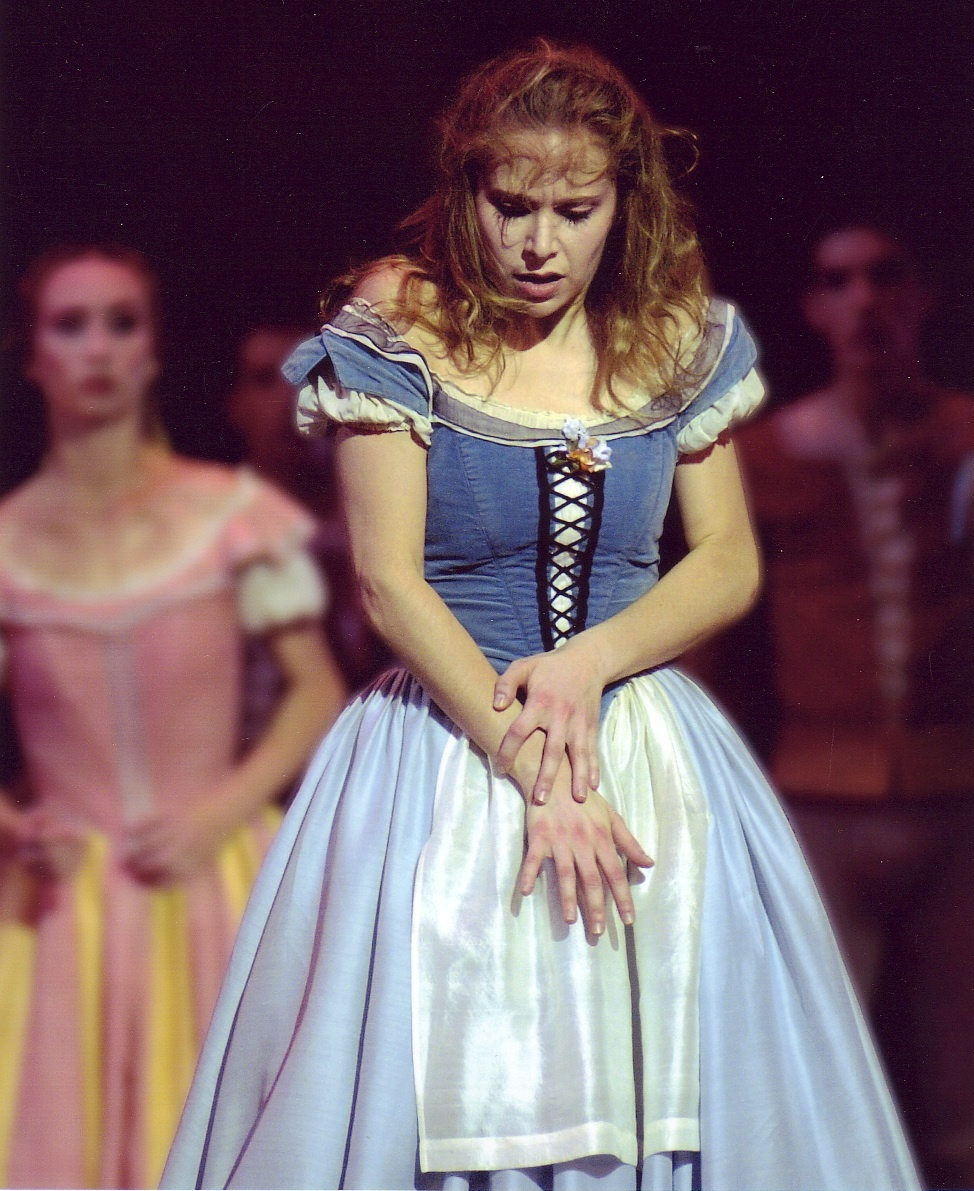
Laetitia Pujol dancing Giselle (2012)

Laetitia Pujol (born 8 October 1975) is a French ballet dancer. She joined the Paris Opera Ballet in 1993, becoming a principal in 2000 and a star (étoile) in 2002.

== Early life ==
Born in Toulouse, she started to dance ballet when she was eight but was not admitted to the Conservatoire régional de Toulouse until 1992. After she won first prize at the Lausanne Ballet Competition the following year, she was able to proceed immediately to the final year of the Paris Opera Ballet School. There she danced Lise in Claude Bessy's La fille mal gardée. Pujol graduated in 1993 at the age of 18.

== Career ==
After joining the Paris Opera's corps de ballet, she became a principal in 2000, which provided opportunities for her to dance Polyhymnia in George Balanchine's Apollo, Catherine in Kader Belarbi's Wuthering Heights, Henriette in Raymonda and Clara in The Nutcracker. Jiri Kylian chose her to dance the pas de trois in the First Act of Pierre Lacotte's adaptation of Paquita.

In May 2002, after she stood in for Clairemarie Osta, dancing Kitri for the first time in Rudolf Nureyev's Don Quixote, Pujol received the prestigious title of étoile. More recent additions to her repertoire include leading roles in Balanchine's ballets Symphony in C, The Four Temperaments, Concerto Barocco, Tschaikovsky Pas de Deux, Agon and Serenade. She has also danced Nathalie in José Martinez' Les Enfants du paradis, the title role in John Neumeier's Sylvia and the Young Girl in Roland Petit's Le Loup.

Pujol retired from the Paris Opera Ballet on 23 September 2017, following a performance of Balanchine's "Emeralds" and the final pas de deux from Neumeier's Sylvia.

== Awards ==
In addition to the Lausanne medal in 1992, Laetitia Pujol has received the Silver Medal (juniors) at the 1994 Varna International Competition and, in 1997, the Prix du Cercle Carpeaux.
