= Sae Eun Park =

South Korean ballet dancer

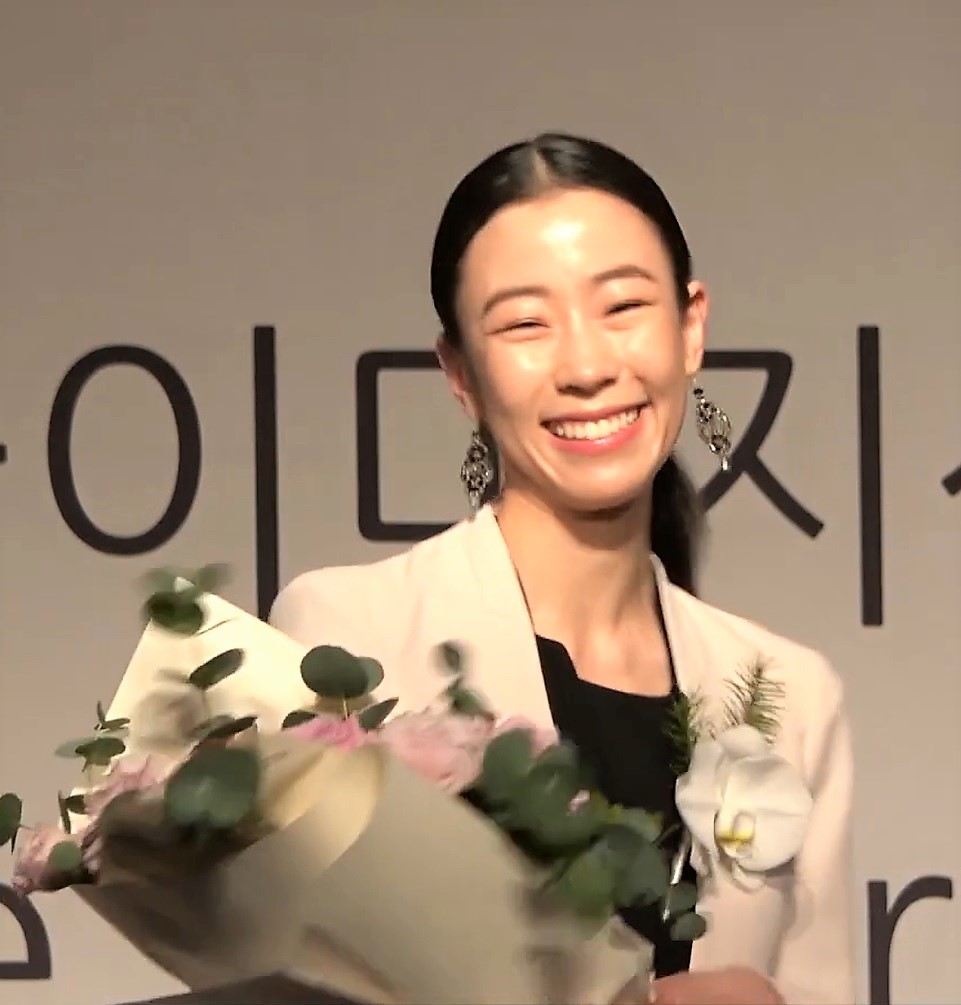
- Sae Eun Park receiving a Korea Image Award in 2019
- Born: December 1989 (age 36); Seoul, South Korea
- Education: Korea National University of Arts
- Occupation: Ballet dancer
- Career
- Current group: Paris Opera Ballet
- Former groups: ABT II; Korea National Ballet

Sae Eun Park (Korean: 박세은; born December 1989) is a South Korean ballet dancer. Following stints at ABT II and Korea National Ballet in her early career, she joined the Paris Opera Ballet in 2011. She is the company's first Korean female full-time member. In 2021, she became the first dancer from Asia to reach the rank of étoile at the company.

== Early life ==
Park was born in Seoul in December 1989. She started ballet at 10, and studied at Korea National University of Arts. She was mainly trained in the Vaganova method, before Kim Yong-geol, a former Korean Paris Opera Ballet dancer and a professor at the university introduced her to the French style. In 2006, she won the silver medal in the junior division USA International Ballet Competition in Jackson, Mississippi.

== Career ==
In 2007, she competed at the Prix de Lausanne and received a scholarship to American Ballet Theatre's second company, ABT II. In May 2009, she returned to her home country and joined the Korea National Ballet, where she became a soloist and performed main roles. In 2010, she won the first prize at the Varna International Ballet Competition.

In 2011, Park joined the Paris Opera Ballet with a fixed-term contract as a corps de ballet dancer. A year later, she became a permanent member, after ranking first among 130 applicants in an audition, making her the first Korean woman to dance with the company full-time. In 2013, she was promoted to coryphée. She also received the Prix Du Cercle Carpeaux, and was the first Korean recipient of the award. The following year, she became a sujet. In December 2014, she danced as Naila in Jean-Guillaume Bart's La Source, thus becoming the first Asian dancer to perform a lead role in Paris Opera Ballet's history. In 2015, she performed at Mariinsky Theatre in St Petersburg, Russia.

In 2017, Park was named première danseuse, the second highest rank in the company. She is the first Korean and second Asian to reach this rank. In 2018, she was awarded the Prix Benois de la Danse for her performance in "Diamonds" from Balanchine's Jewels. She is the fourth Korean to win the award, after Kang Sue-jin, Kim Joo-won and Kim Kimin. In June 2021, following a performance of Nureyev's Romeo and Juliet, in which she portrayed Juliet, she was named étoile by Paris Opera director Alexander Neef, at the suggestion of director of dance Aurélie Dupont. She is the first dancer from Asia and one of only a few foreigners to hold the title.
