= Eurovision Young Dancers 1991 =

International youth dance competition

Date and venue
- Final: 5 June 1991
- Venue: Helsinki City Theatre; Helsinki, Finland

Organisation
- Organiser: European Broadcasting Union (EBU)
- Executive supervisor: Frank Naef

Production
- Host broadcaster: Yleisradio (YLE)
- Producer: Anna-Kaarina Kiviniemi
- Director: Izan Lewenstam
- Executive producer: Aarno Cronvall
- Presenters: Taina Elg; Heikki Värtsi

Participants
- Number of entries: 15
- Number of finalists: 8
- Debuting countries: Bulgaria
- Non-returning countries: Austria; Canada; United Kingdom
- Participation map: frameless}} Participating countries Did not qualify from the semi-final Countries that participated in the past but not in 1991

Vote
- Voting system: A professional jury chose the top 3 participants.
- Winning dancers: Spain; Amaya Iglesias

Eurovision Young Dancers 1991 was the 4th edition of Eurovision Young Dancers, held on 5 June 1991 at the Helsinki City Theatre in Helsinki, Finland, and presented by Taina Elg and Heikki Värtsi. It was organised by the European Broadcasting Union (EBU) and host broadcaster Yleisradio (YLE).

Dancers representing fifteen countries took part in the competition, with eight of them participating in the televised final. Bulgaria made their début (making this the first Eurovision event to feature a former Warsaw Pact country ahead of the Eurovision Song Contest 1994), while Austria, Canada and United Kingdom chose not to send an entry. However, the Austrian broadcaster ÖRF and the Canadian CBC broadcast the event.

Each participating broadcaster could send one or two dancers, male or female, who could perform one or two dances.

The winner was Amaya Iglesias representing Spain, with Emmanuel Thibault representing France placing second, and Johan Kobborg representing Denmark placing third.

== Location ==
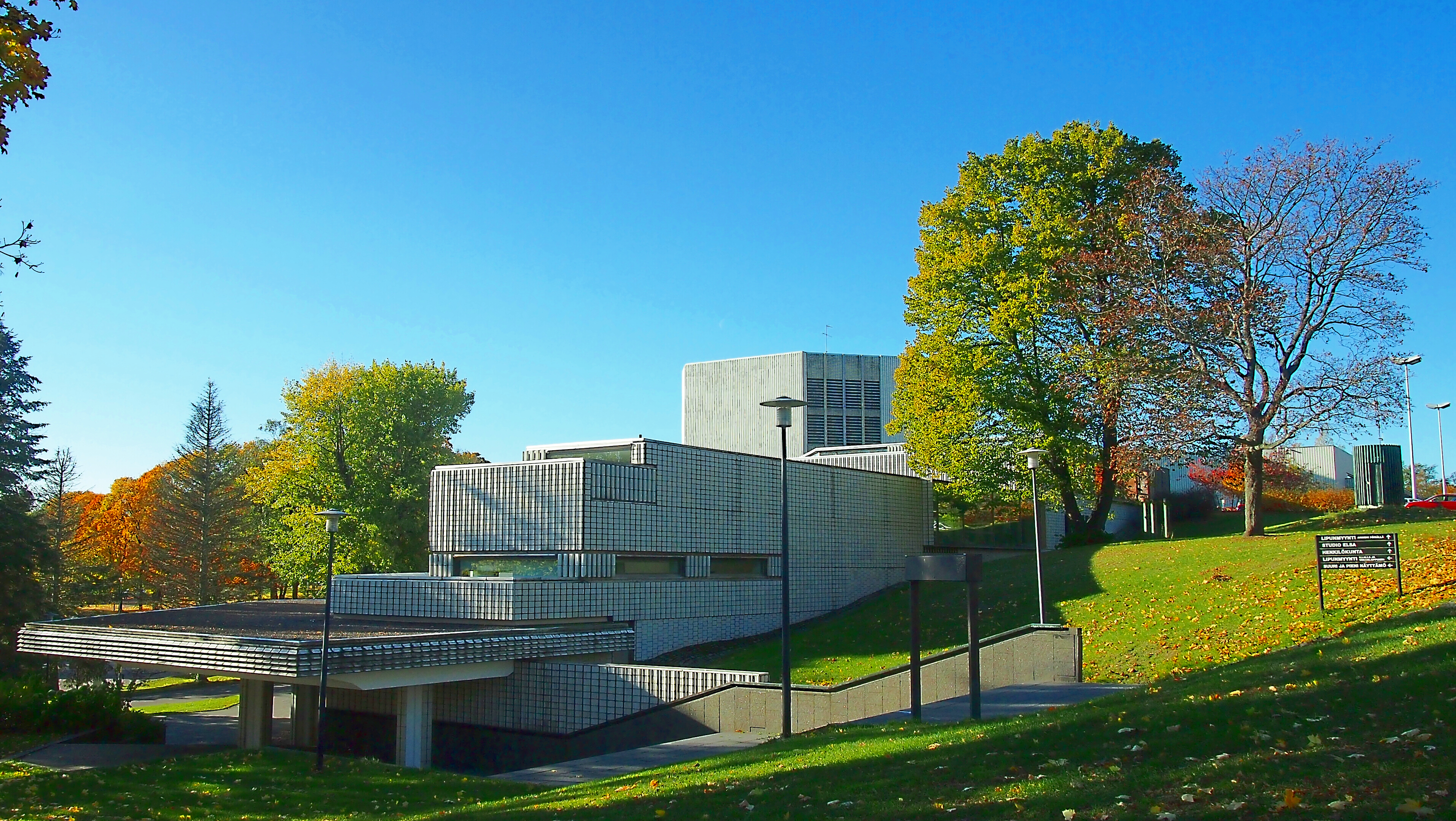
Helsinki City Theatre

Helsinki City Theatre, was the host venue for the 1991 edition of Eurovision Young Dancers.

== Format ==
The format consists of dancers who are non-professional and between the ages of 16–21, competing in a performance of dance routines of their choice, which they have prepared in advance of the competition. All of the acts then take part in a choreographed group dance during 'Young Dancers Week'.

Jury members of a professional aspect and representing the elements of ballet, contemporary, and modern dancing styles, score each of the competing individual and group dance routines. The overall winner upon completion of the final dances is chosen by the professional jury members.

During the interval a documentary by Finnish journalist Eila-Maija Mirolybov about the early stages of the competition and the dancers who did not reach the final was broadcast.

== Participants and results ==
=== Preliminary round ===
Broadcasters from fifteen countries took part in the preliminary round of the 1991 contest, of which eight qualified to the televised grand final. The following participants failed to qualify.

Country	Broadcaster	Dancer(s)	Dance	Choreographer
Italy	RAI	Alen Bottaini	Grand pas classique	V. Gsovsky
Belgium	RTBF	Vanessa Eertmans	Concerto for Harpsichord and Strings in D minor	D. Sonnenbluck
Finland	YLE	Titta-Tuulia Karhunen and Pasi Sinisalo	Le Corsaire	M. Petipa
Portugal	RTP	Sonia Lima	Don Quixote	M. Petipa
Norway	NRK	Ingrid Trøite Lorentzen	Don Quixote	M. Petipa
Cyprus	CyBC	Hélène O'Keefe	Glorianna, Hymne à la femme	N. Mújaszí
Yugoslavia	JRT	Ana Pavlovic	Coppelia	K. Damjanov

=== Final ===
Awards were given to the top three participants. The table below highlights these using gold, silver, and bronze. The placing results of the remaining participants is unknown and never made public by the European Broadcasting Union.

R/O	Country	Broadcaster	Dancer(s)	Dance	Choreographer	Result
	Spain	TVE	Amaya Iglesias	Variations from "La Grisi"	L. de Ávila	1
	France	FR3	Emmanuel Thibault	La Sylphide	F. Taglioni	2
	Denmark	DR	Johan Kobborg	La Sylphide	A. Bournonville	3
	Bulgaria	BNT	Diliana Nikiforova	The Sleeping Beauty	M. Petipa	
	Germany	ZDF	Celia Volk	Le Corsaire	M. Petipa	
	Netherlands	NOS	Boris de Leeuw	Prelude to a Kis	P. de Ruiter	
	Sweden	SVT	Kim Saveus	Le Corsaire	M. Petipa	
	Switzerland	SRG SSR	Sarah Locher	The Sleeping Beauty	M. Petipa	

== Jury members ==
The jury members consisted of the following:

- Finland – Jorma Uotinen (Head of Jury)
- France – Josette Amiel
- Denmark – Frank Andersen
- Romania/France – Gigi Căciuleanu
- Germany – Peter Van Dyk
- France – André-Philippe Hersin
- Switzerland – Heinz Spoerli
- Sweden – Gösta Svalberg
- Spain – Víctor Ullate

== Broadcasting ==
The 1991 Young Dancers competition was broadcast in 17 countries including Austria and Canada. Known details on the broadcasts in each country, including the specific broadcasting stations and commentators are shown in the tables below.

Broadcasters in participating countries
Country	Broadcaster	Channel(s)	Commentator(s)	Ref(s)
Belgium	RTBF	Télé 21 (Note: Deferred broadcast on 6 June at 20:00 (CEST))	Benoît Jacques de Dixmude	
Bulgaria	BNT			
Cyprus	CyBC	RIK		
Denmark	DR	DR TV (Note: Delayed broadcast on 9 June at 21:50 (CET))	Niels Oxenvad	
Finland	YLE	TV1		
France	FR3 (Note: Delayed broadcast on 7 June at 22:45 (CET))		Alain Duault	
Germany	ZDF (Note: Delayed broadcast at 22:25 (CET))			
Italy	RAI			
Netherlands	NOS	Nederland 3	Boris de Leeuw	
Norway	NRK	NRK Fjernsynet		
Portugal	RTP			
Spain	TVE			
Sweden	SVT	Kanal 1	Jacob Dahlin	
Switzerland	SRG SSR	SRG Sportkette		
Switzerland	SRG SSR	SSR Chaîne Sportive	Jean-Pierre Pastori	
Switzerland	SRG SSR	TSI Canale Sportivo		
Yugoslavia	JRT	TV Beograd 1 (Note: Deferred broadcast on 6 June at 8:30 (CEST))		
Yugoslavia	JRT	HTV 1 (Note: Deferred broadcast on 28 July at 22:40 (CEST))		

Broadcasters in non-participating countries
Country	Broadcaster	Channel(s)	Commentator(s)	Ref(s)
Austria	ORF	FS2 (Note: Delayed broadcast in a shortened format on 22 June at 15:00 (CET))		
Canada	CBC			

== See also ==
- Eurovision Song Contest 1991
