= Hugo Marchand =

French ballet dancer

- Born: 7 December 1993 (age 32); Nantes, France
- Education: Nantes Conservatory; Paris Opera Ballet School
- Occupation: ballet dancer
- Career
- Current group: Paris Opera Ballet

Hugo Marchand (born 7 December 1993) is a French ballet dancer. He joined the Paris Opera Ballet in 2011 and was named étoile in 2017, at age 23.

== Early life ==
Marchand was born in Nantes. He trained at Nantes Conservatory, before leaving home to study at the Paris Opera Ballet School for four years. He stated that he "didn't like the atmosphere or the rigid structure very much".

== Career ==
In 2011, Marchand joined the Paris Opera Ballet. In 2014, he won the third prize at the Varna International Ballet Competition. The same year, he was spotted by Benjamin Millepied, who had just become the director of dance, and Marchand began understudying for lead roles, which led to his debuts in The Nutcracker, La Bayadère and Balanchine's Theme and Variations. Marchand was promoted every year under Millepied's tenure, and the pattern continued after Aurélie Dupont took over.

In March 2017, Marchand was promoted to étoile following his unexpected debut as James in Lacotte's La Sylphide when the company was touring in Japan. Months later, he was awarded Prix Benois de la Danse for his performance as Romeo in Nureyev's Romeo and Juliet. His repertory includes classical ballets, as well as works by Millepied, George Balanchine, Jerome Robbins, John Cranko, Rudolf Nureyev and William Forsythe.

In 2021, his memoir Danser was published. Marchand stated he thought he was too young to write one but the editor told him she "wanted to hear the voice of a young person talking about following their passion, and what the costs were of that". He wrote it with the help of Caroline de Bodinat. Later that year, he worked with colleague Hannah O'Neill on a pas de deux for Gagosian Premieres.

== See also ==
- List of dance personalities
- List of French writers
- List of people from Nantes
