= Attilio Labis =

French ballet dancer (1936–2023)

Attilio Labis (5 September 1936 – 26 January 2023) was a French ballet dancer and teacher. He was regarded as a star of the Paris Opera.

== Early life ==
Attilio Labis was born in 1936 to a Sicilian father and French mother. He began his training at the Opéra de Paris when he was nine years old and rose through the ranks of the school.

== Dance career ==
In 1952, Labis was accepted into the corps de ballet Paris Opera Ballet, but in 1958 he had to join the military. Upon the completion of his military service, he came back and successfully auditioned for a "Premier Danseur" (First soloist) position after only one week of training. He was promoted to "Danseur Étoile" (principal dancer) approximately one year later, after André Malraux saw him dance "Pas de Dieux", a choreography by Gene Kelly, and recommended he be promoted. He performed as a Danseur Étoile (principal dancer) in the Paris Opera Ballet from 1960 to 1972, then taught the company as a ballet teacher until his retirement.

Labis was regarded as having brought many technical innovations to the French school, including more acrobatic steps in solos and duets, and moving the foot higher to the "retiré au genou" (knee height) position for pirouettes, from the old "à la cheville" (ankle height) position.

Labis often performed with his wife, "Étoile" Christine Vlassi, as well as with other "Étoiles" such as Margot Fonteyn and Claude Bessy.

He originated the role of Siegfried in the Vladimir Bourmeister staging of Swan Lake at the Paris Opera Ballet.

== Death ==
Labis died on 26 January 2023, at the age of 86.

== Filmography ==
Labis appeared in several films and television series, including L' Âge en fleur (1975), Le Spectre de la danse (1986), and Les Cahiers retrouvés de Nina Vyroubova.

== Choreography ==
- Romeo & Juliet (full-length), music by S. Prokofiev, with Christiane Vlassi and Attilio Labis
- Arcades, set to 3 overtures by Berlioz, danced by Christiane Vlassi & Attilio Labis
- Spartacus (full-length) Chorégraphie Attilio Labis, interpreté par Attilio Labis and Christiane Vlassi
- Sarabande, danced by Attilio Labis, Claude Bessy, Georges Piletta, Patrick Frantz, Christiane Vlassi
- Swan Lake, danced by Margot Fonteyn, Attilio Labis, Christiane Vlassi
- Coppélia, danced by par Christiane Vlassi and Attilio Labis
- Passion, pas de deux, music by Charles Dumont
- Romeo & Juliet, pas de deux, music by Tchaikovsky
