= Michaël Denard =

German-born French dancer and stage actor (1944–2023)

- Born: 5 November 1944; Dresden, Gau Saxony, Germany
- Died: 17 February 2023 (aged 78)
- Occupations: Dancer; Actor

Michaël Denard (5 November 1944 – 17 February 2023) was a French dancer and stage actor.

== Biography ==
Born in Dresden on 5 November 1944 to a German mother and French father, Denard lived as a baby in his hometown during its bombardment. He began dancing in the corps de ballet of the Capitole de Toulouse in 1963 and for the Opéra national de Lorraine in 1964. In 1966, he was invited to the Jeunesses musicales de France by Pierre Lacotte, where he danced with Ghislaine Thesmar for the first time. At the end of 1966, he joined the Paris Opera Ballet, where he quickly rose through the ranks. On 19 December 1969, he danced with Lynn Seymour in Swan Lake at the Deutsche Oper Berlin.

Denard briefly worked in television and cinema. He was also the first guest to appear on Maritie and Gilbert Carpentier's show, Numéro un.

Denard retired from ballet in 1989 and began to take on dancing roles as an actor, such as Le Martyre de saint Sébastien directed by Robert Wilson.

Michaël Denard died on 17 February 2023, at the age of 78.

== Filmography ==
=== Film ===
- La Rumba (1987)

=== Television ===
- Chouette, chat, chien… show (1980)
- La Garçonne (1988)
- Les Filles du Lido (1995)

== Distinctions ==
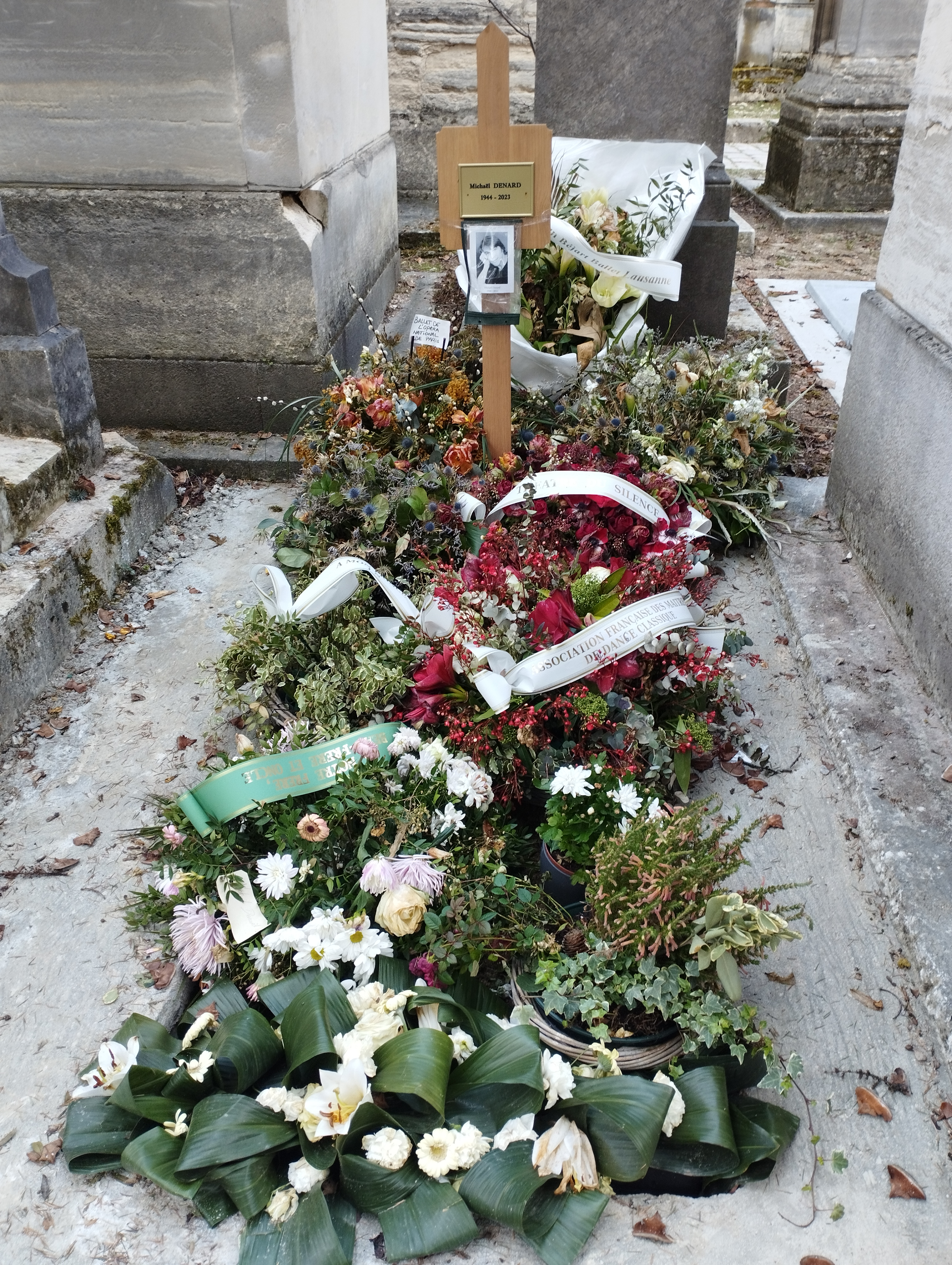
Grave in Père Lachaise Cemetery (Paris).

- Knight of the Legion of Honour
- Officer of the Ordre des Arts et des Lettres
- Officer of the Ordre national du Mérite (2004)
