= Valentine Colasante =

French ballet dancer

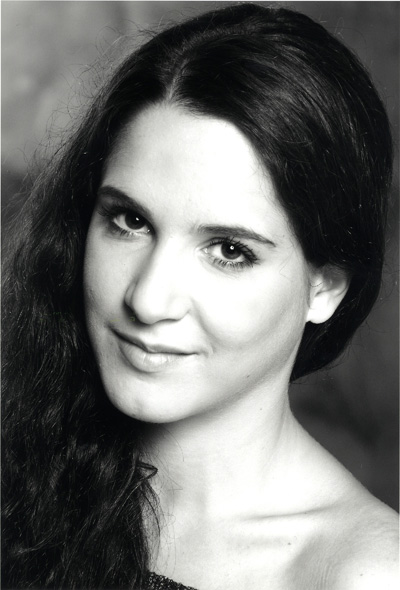
- Born: March 5, 1989 (age 36); Paris, France
- Occupation: Ballet dancer
- Years active: 2006-present
- Career
- Current group: Paris Opera Ballet
- Dances: Ballet

Valentine Colasante (born 5 March 1989) is a French ballet dancer. She is an étoile at the Paris Opera Ballet.

== Biography ==
Colasante was born in Paris to a ballet teacher mother and jazz pianist father, both originally from Italy. She entered the Paris Opera Ballet School in 1998 and entered the Paris Opera Ballet in 2006, at the age of 17. Colasante was promoted to Coryphée in 2010 and sujet the following year. She was named Première danseuse in 2013. Her first major role is Theme and Variations. She worked with Aurélie Dupont for that role.

In January 2018, Colasante danced the role of Kitri in Don Quixote with three days notice, and partnered with Karl Paquette. The show was Paquette's last Don Quixote. Following her performance, Dupont, now the artistic director, promoted Colasante to the rank of étoile on stage. She has danced classical productions, such as the title role in Cinderella and Myrtha in Giselle, as well as modern pieces such as Pina Bausch's Le Sacre du printemps and William Forsythe's In the Middle, Somewhat Elevated. Colasante was Paquette's partner when he bid farewell.

== Selected repertoire ==
- The Second Variation in La Bayadère
- Brahms–Schoenberg Quartet
- Bella Figura
- The title role in Cinderella
- Concerto Barocco
- Dances at a Gathering
- Kitri in Don Quixote
- Myrtha in Giselle
- In Creases
- In the Middle, Somewhat Elevated
- "Rubies" from Jewels
- Lescaut's Mistress in Manon
- The title role in Raymonda
- The Chosen One in Le Sacre du printemps
- Odette/Odile, the Pas de trois and The Spanish Dance in Swan Lake
- Effie in La Sylphide
- Theme and Variations
- Prudence in La Dame aux camélias
