= Paul Marque =

French dancer

- Born: 12 April 1997 (age 27); Dax, Landes, France
- Education: Paris Opera Ballet School
- Occupation: ballet dancer
- Career
- Current group: Paris Opera Ballet

Paul Marque (born 12 April 1997) is a French ballet dancer . In December 2020, he was named an étoile (literally, "star"), the highest rank of the Paris Opera Ballet.

== Biography ==
Paul Marque was born in Dax, Landes and began dancing at the age of four with jazz dance at the studio, "On Stage" in Dax, directed by Laetitia Michel. Born to a father who is a radiologist and a mother who was a radiologist in the army, he is one of four children. At the age of seven, he discovered ballet when he began attending Nicole Cavallin's school of dance in Biarritz.

In January 2008, at the age of ten, he entered the Paris Opera Ballet School before graduating to the Paris Opera Ballet. He was promoted to the rank of coryphée, the second of five ranks within the Paris Opera Ballet, in 2016. He won the gold medal at the Varna International Ballet Competition in 2016.

In 2017, Marque was promoted to the rank of sujet. He also won the Prix de l'Association pour le rayonnement de l'Opéra national de Paris, which is an annual prize from the non-profit group that promotes the works and dancers of the Paris Opera Ballet. Marque was again promoted in 2018 to the rank of premier danseur, the second highest rank within the Paris Opera Ballet.

On 13 December 2020, at 23 years old, Marque was promoted to the highest rank of étoile, literally "star", of the Paris Opera Ballet, based upon the recommendation of Aurélie Dupont, dance director of the Paris Opera. The announcement was made following a performance of Rudolf Nureyev's production of La Bayadère. In that performance, Marque danced in the role of the Golden Idol, which is a secondary role in that ballet. The Paris Opera was closed to the public due to the COVID-19 pandemic, so that show was performed without a live audience, but was watched by 10,000 spectators in an online broadcast on the streaming platform L’Opéra chez soi, which was launched a few days prior.

== Répertoire ==
After starting with the Paris Opera Ballet, Marque has danced in a number of productions, notably, Cinderella, Swan Lake, Giselle, La Sylphide, The Nutcracker, Don Quixote, and La Bayadère. Other works he has danced in include Blake Works I by William Forsythe in 2016, Undoing World by Bruno Bouché in 2017, and Dogs Sleep by Marco Goecke in 2019.

Marque has also danced in A Midsummer Night's Dream by George Balanchine in 2017, and in two choreographies of Jerome Robbins: The Goldberg Variations in 2016 and Fancy Free in 2018.
