= Guillaume Diop =

French ballet dancer (born 2000)

- Born: 2000 (age 24–25); Paris, France
- Education: Paris Opera Ballet School
- Occupation: ballet dancer
- Years active: 2018–present
- Career
- Current group: Paris Opera Ballet

Guillaume Diop (born 2000) is a French ballet dancer. He joined the Paris Opera Ballet in 2018, and was promoted to étoile in March 2023, becoming the first black person to reach a principal rank in the company's history.

== Early life and education ==
Diop was born in the 18th arrondissement of Paris, to a French mother and a Senegalese father. His father works for Aeroméxico, and his mother for the local council in Gennevilliers, a suburb of Paris.

Diop began dancing at age four. He started training at a local conservatory at age eight, then a regional conservatory at age ten. At age twelve, he entered the Paris Opera Ballet School, where he trained for six years and graduated first in his class.

When he was 16, Diop attended a summer intensive at the Alvin Ailey American Dance Theater in New York. As a teenager, Diop battled with anorexia.

== Career ==
In 2018, Diop joined the Paris Opera Ballet. In September 2020, in response to the Paris Opera's inaction following the George Floyd protests, Diop, along with the four other black dancers of the company, wrote a manifesto titled "De la question raciale à l'Opéra de Paris", which questioned certain practices within the opera house and called for urgent changes to address racial discrimination. The manifesto was sent to all of the employees of the opera, and over 400 of them, about a quarter of the employees, signed the manifesto. The company responded with a report on diversity at the opera house, which was published in February 2021. Alexander Neef, the general director of Paris Opera, announced actions to tackle racist caricatures in classic ballet.

In 2021, he made his debut as Romeo in Nureyev's Romeo and Juliet, as a replacement for an injured Germain Louvet, and opposite Léonore Baulac's Juliet. At the time, he held the lowest rank of quadrille, and became the first quadrille to dance a lead role in a major full-length work since Mathilde Froustey in 2003. He also danced the Wedding pas de deux from The Sleeping Beauty, for the company's Young Dancer programme.

In 2022, Diop was promoted to coryphée. He took on more lead roles including Basilio in Don Quixote, Solor in La Bayadère and Prince Siegfried in Swan Lake, filling in for more senior dancers who were indisposed. He also appeared in Gerard & Kelly's video Panorama. Diop was promoted to sujet, third of the five ranks, in 2023.

In March 2023, the 23-year-old Diop was promoted to étoile, the highest rank at the Paris Opera Ballet, after dancing as Albrecht in Giselle during a tour to Seoul, South Korea. Unusually, he skipped the rank of premier danseur. Diop also became the first dancer with black ancestry to reach this rank in the company's history.

In 2024, Diop performed in the Olympic Opening ceremony in Paris, where he danced a solo on the rooftop of the Hôtel de Ville. He also served as an episodic guest judge on Drag Race France, and starred in a campaign for Jacquemus' collaboration with Nike.

== Awards and honours ==
In 2021, Diop was awarded the Cercle Carpeaux Dance Prize, awarded to outstanding young corps de ballet dancers of the Paris Opera Ballet.

In 2022, Diop was listed among "30 under 30" by the French edition of Vanity Fair. In 2023, he was one of Dance Magazine's "25 to Watch".
