= Michel Renault =

French ballet dancer, choreographer and teacher (1927–1993)

- Born: 1927; Paris, France
- Died: 29 January 1993 (aged 65–66); Paris, France
- Occupations: Ballet dancer, choreographer, teacher
- Years active: 1944–1987
- Known for: Premier danseur étoile of the Paris Opera Ballet

Michel Renault (1927 – 29 January 1993) was a French ballet dancer, choreographer and teacher. After the Second World War he was one of the leading male stars of the Paris Opera Ballet.

== Early life ==
Renault was born in Paris in 1927, and began studying dance at an early age. He entered the Paris Opera Ballet School at the age of eleven, where his teachers included Gustave Ricaux, Albert Aveline, and Carlotta Zambelli. Renault joined the Paris Opera Ballet in 1944, during the Nazi occupation of France. Two years later he became premier danseur étoile at the age of eighteen, the youngest dancer in the company's history to hold the title.

== Career ==
Renault was closely associated with choreographer Serge Lifar, whose neo-classical style strongly influenced his own dancing. He performed in many of Lifar's ballets, including Les Mirages, Chevalier et la Demoiselle and Guignol et Pandore. He also danced in classics such as Giselle and Sylvia.

In 1947, balletmaster George Balanchine selected Renault for all his productions at the Opera, including Apollo, Serenade, Le Baiser de la Fée, and Palais de Cristal. He appeared with the Opera during its 1948 tour to the United States and later danced internationally, including tours of North Africa, Canada, and South America.

After leaving the Paris Opera in 1959, Renault toured with ballerina Liane Daydé and later joined the Ballet Classique de Serge Lifar. From the 1960s onward, he taught widely, including at the School of American Ballet and the New York City Ballet, as well as the Briansky Ballet Center in Saratoga Springs, New York.

== Later life and death ==
Renault retired from dancing in the mid-1960s and turned to choreography for Paris cabarets. He became a respected teacher at the Paris Opera Ballet School from 1972 until his retirement in 1987. He died of hepatitis in Paris on 29 January 1993 at the age of 65.
