= Clairemarie Osta =

French ballet dancer

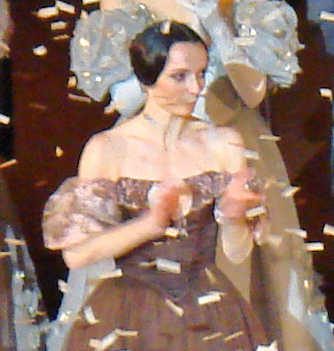
- Osta at the curtain call of Onegin
- Born: 10 July 1970 (age 55); Nice, France
- Education: Conservatoire de Nice; Conservatoire de Paris; Paris Opera Ballet School
- Occupation: ballet dancer
- Spouse: Nicolas Le Riche
- Children: 2
- Career
- Former groups: Paris Opera Ballet

Clairemarie Osta (born 1970) is a French ballet dancer who performed with the Paris Opera Ballet as an étoile. In 2017, she became the head of the ballet department at the Royal Swedish Ballet School.

== Early life and training ==
Osta was born in Nice, and started ballet at age 5. She trained at the Conservatoire de Nice, and then the Conservatoire de Paris. In 1987, she enrolled in Paris Opera Ballet School, at the encouragement of Roland Petit, and trained there for a year.

== Career ==
Osta joined the Paris Opera Ballet in 1988. In 1994, she won third prize at the Varna International Ballet Competition. In 2002, at age 32, Osta was named étoile after a performance of Paquita. Choreographers she had worked with include Rudolf Nureyev, Carolyn Carlson, John Neumeier, Jiří Kylián, Jerome Robbins, Roland Petit, Mats Ek and William Forsythe. Osta retired from the Paris Opera Ballet in 2012, following a performance of Manon.

Osta became the director of choreographic studies at Conservatoire de Paris in 2013, then ran the L’Atelier d’Art Chorégraphique between 2015 and 2017. In 2017, she became the head of ballet at Royal Swedish Ballet School in Stockholm. Osta is a recipient of the Chevalier des Arts et des Lettres and Chevalier de la Légion d'honneur.

== Personal life ==
Osta is married to Nicolas Le Riche, previously an étoile at the Paris Opera Ballet and now head of the Royal Swedish Ballet. They have two daughters.
