= Marie-Agnès Gillot =

French ballet dancer

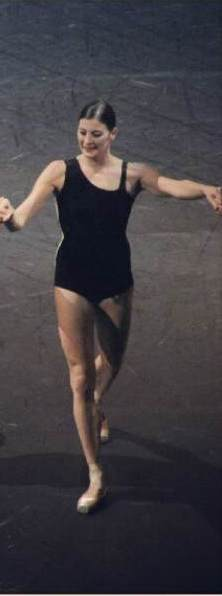
- Gillot in 2013
- Born: 7 September 1975 (age 50); Caen, France
- Occupations: Ballet dancer; Choreographer
- Years active: 1990-present
- Height: 175 cm (5 ft 9 in)
- Children: 1
- Career
- Former groups: Paris Opera Ballet

Marie-Agnès Gillot (born in 1975) is a French ballet dancer and choreographer. She danced with the Paris Opera Ballet as an étoile. She is also POB's first in-house female dancer to choreograph for the company.

== Early life ==
Gillot was born in Caen, to an accountant and a physical therapist. She started In 1985, at age 9, she left home to train at Paris Opera Ballet School.

When Gillot was 12, she grew 12 centimetres in a year, and was diagnosed with double scoliosis. Fearing a surgery would leave her disabled, she opted to wear a brace instead. She wore it for 6 years, only remove it when she was dancing, and hid it from her peers.

== Career ==
=== As dancer ===
In 1990, at age 15, Gillot joined the Paris Opera Ballet's corps de ballet. She is the youngest-ever dancer to do so. She was promoted to coryphée in 1992. She obtained her teaching certification at age 18. At first, she was only cast in minor, non-dancing role. Therefore, she flew to New York, hoping to audition for New York City Ballet. However, Manuel Legris contacted her, and convinced her to return to Paris. She got more roles after she returned.

Gillot was promoted to sujet in 1994. In 1999, she was named première danseuse. She stayed in that position for five years, but had danced lead roles including the title role in Paquita and Odette/Odile in Swan Lake.

Initially, Gillot wasn't interested in contemporary roles, but choreographers, including William Forsythe and Mats Ek created roles for her when she wasn't cast in classical roles. Eventually, she became the company's exemplar for contemporary works.

In 2004, following a performance of Carolyn Carlson's Signes, she was named étoile. She is the first dancer to achieve the rank of étoile following a contemporary work. She was promoted at age 28, which was relatively late. Her repertoire include works by Rudolf Nureyev, George Balanchine and Jerome Robbins. She had originated works for choreographers including Jiří Kylián, Wayne McGregor, Anne Teresa de Keersmaeker and Crystal Pite.

In 2018, following a performance of Pina Bausch's Orpheus and Eurydice, Gillot retired from Paris Opera Ballet, as she was 42, the retirement age at the company, a rule which Gillot found "stupid." She had plans to perform in contemporary works following her retirement.

=== As choreographer ===
Gillot first choreographed in 2007. Her first work is a piece with Dresden Semperoper Ballett principal Jiri Bubenicek, which was performed in festivals. She had since choreographed for Conservatoire de Paris, a hip-hop group and several pieces for television. She was later commissioned by the Paris Opera Ballet, making her the first in-house female dancer to choreograph for the company. Her piece, Sous Apparence, premiered in 2012. In 2023 she worked with Charlotte Dauphin on the film Barre. They both reunited in 2024 for a unique performance of Dauphin's piece The Future of Statues at Musée de l'Orangerie in Paris.

== Style ==
Choreographer Wayne McGregor commented she could "do anything choreographically that you throw at her, and then more." Carolyn Carlson, who created Signes, the piece that led to Gillot's promotion, said Gillot was "especially gifted in a cosmic, mystic realm, capable of transforming that mysticism into movement." Dance Magazine called her "powerfully athletic and spiritually enraptured."

== Other ventures ==
=== Fashion ===
She was part of the luxury French brand Céline's Spring/Summer 2015 campaign, shot by Juergen Teller : "I thought of it more as a dialogue between three artists." she declared.

Before that, she was the image of Repetto and appeared in several fashion editorials - alone or together with other principal dancers of Paris Opera Ballet (shot by Philippe Robert in 2008, by Soan & Seng in 2015).

She confirmed her interest into fashion participating in a film by Daniel Askill : "Even where the dancer is more conventionally dressed, the film and choreography work their own transformations. Paris Opera ballerina Marie-Agnès Gillot wears a black lace dress from McQueen, yet as she dances it becomes the shroud of a dying swan, a goth ballgown, the robes of a flying angel".

"Gillot held court as the Grand Master of the Grand Temple" in Gareth Pugh's Fall 2016 show that took place at the art deco Freemasons’ Hall in Covent Garden during London Fashion Week.

=== Activism ===
As an activist, Gillot became involved with children's causes, AIDS, cancer, and women's issues. As an ambassador of Doctor Jacques Leibowitch's ICCARRE (Intermittent, in Canny short Cycles, Antiretrovirals may Retain Efficiency), she performed, alongside Marianne Faithfull and the sisters, Katia and Marielle Labèque, at the Jean-Paul Gaultier headquarters in 2015.

== Personal life ==
Gillot has a son, whom she chose to raise on her own.

== Awards and honours ==
- Prix Benois de la Danse, 2005
- Chevalier des Arts et des Lettres
- Ordre national du Mérite
