= Hannah O'Neill =

New Zealand ballet dancer

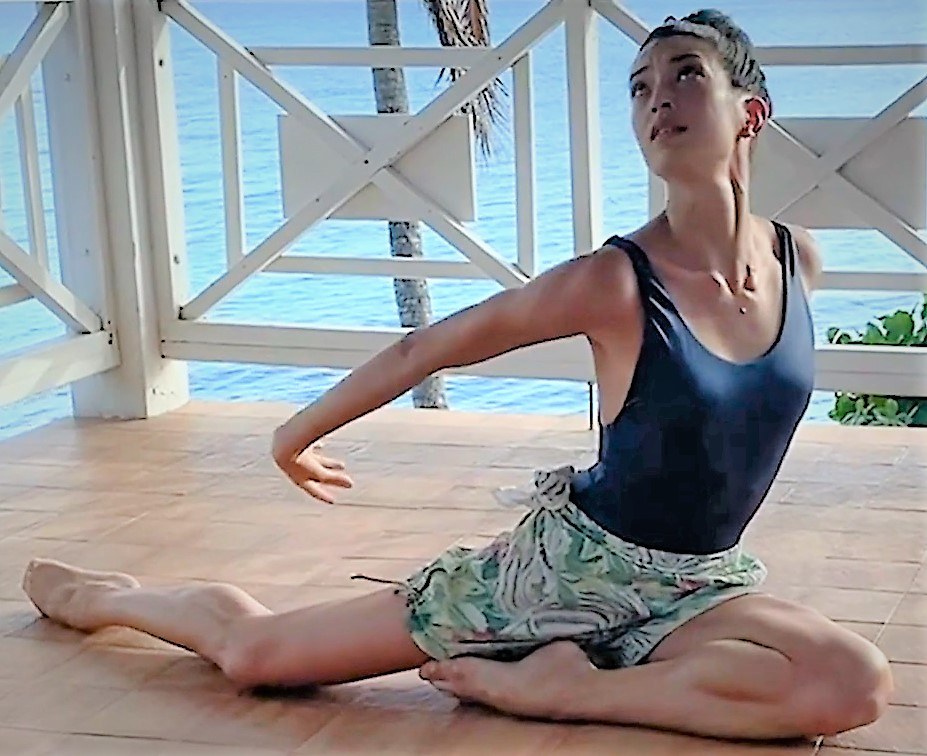
- O'Neill dances for Swans for Relief in 2020
- Born: 8 January 1993 (age 33); Tokyo, Japan
- Education: Australian Ballet School
- Occupation: Ballet dancer
- Years active: 2011–present
- Dancing career
- Current group: Paris Opera Ballet

Hannah O'Neill (born January 8, 1993) is a New Zealand ballet dancer who is an étoile with the Paris Opera Ballet.

== Early life ==
O'Neill was born in Japan to a Japanese mother, Sumie, and a New Zealand father, Chris, a professional rugby player. She has two younger brothers. O'Neill started dancing when she was three years old.

From 1998 to 2007, O'Neill studied at the Kishibe Ballet Studio in Tokyo, Japan. When she turned eight, she moved with her family to Auckland, New Zealand. There, she attended Parnell District School and Epsom Girls' Grammar School. She studied ballet at the Mt Eden Ballet Academy and then in 2008, at the age of 15, moved to Melbourne to study at the Australian Ballet School. In 2011 she graduated as dux of the ballet school.

== Career ==
In 2009, O'Neill won the Prix de Lausanne, the world’s most prestigious competition for young dancers. The next year, she won first place in the senior woman's section at the Youth America Grand Prix in New York. Following these achievements, she passed Paris Opera Ballet's external audition in July 2011 and was accepted into its corps de ballet with a seasonal contract. In August 2012 she was offered a second short-term contract with the company.

Succeeding in the external audition in July 2013, O'Neill was offered a life-time contract. Now a regular member of the Paris Opera Ballet, O'Neill moved up through the ranks, being promoted in each Paris Opera Ballet internal promotion contest from 2013 to 2015. On 3 November 2015, she was ranked first in the Paris Opera Ballet internal promotion contest. Consequently, since 1 January 2016 she danced as a premiere danseuse, the second highest rank in the company.

In spring 2015, O'Neill danced the role of Odette/Odile in Swan Lake which is normally reserved for étoiles. Her second leading role as a premiere danseuse was the title role in Giselle.

In 2020, O'Neill danced The Swan in Misty Copeland's fundraiser, Swans for Relief, a response to the impact of the COVID-19 coronavirus pandemic on the dance community, with funds going to participating dancers' companies and other related relief funds.

In March 2023, O'Neill was promoted to the rank of danseuse étoile at the Paris Opera Ballet.

== Repertoire ==
- Odile-Odette in Swan Lake
- Giselle, Myrtha in Giselle
- Gamzatti in La Bayadère
- Paquita in Paquita
- Ballet Imperial
- The Sylph, Effie in La Sylphide
- Titania in Balanchine's A Midsummer Night's Dream
- The Lady of the Camellias
- Ballet Imperial
- Carmen in Roland Petit's Carmen
- M in Mats Ek's Carmen

== Awards ==
O'Neill was the winner of the Prix de Lausanne in 2009 and of the Youth America Grand Prix in 2010. In 2014, she won the silver medal at Varna International Ballet Competition, the oldest and one of the most prestigious ballet competitions in the world. In 2016, she received the Best Female Dancer award at the Benois de la Danse competition for her performance in the title role of the ballet Paquita. She is the first New Zealand and second Japanese-born recipient of the award, after Mariko Kida.
