= Le jeune homme et la mort =

- Choreographer: Roland Petit
- Libretto: Jean Cocteau
- Premiere: 25 June 1946; Théâtre des Champs-Élysées, Paris
- Original ballet company: Ballets des Champs-Élysées
- Design: Georges Wakhévitch

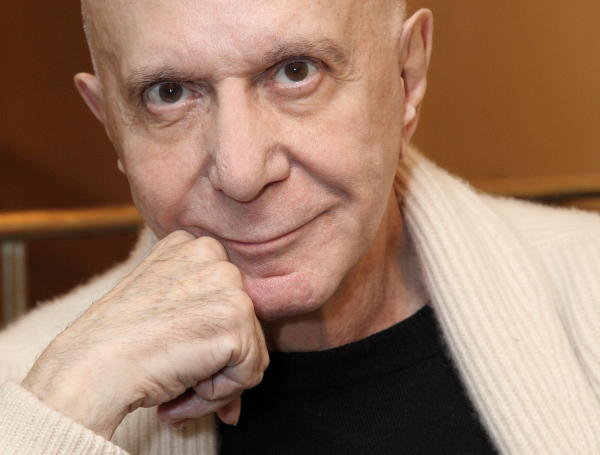
Roland Petit in 2009

Le Jeune Homme et la Mort is a ballet by Roland Petit, choreographed in 1946 to Bach's Passacaglia and Fugue in C Minor, BWV 582, with a one-act libretto by Jean Cocteau. It tells the story of a young man driven to suicide by his faithless lover. Sets were by Georges Wakhévitch and costumes variously reported as being by Karinska or Cocteau. Petit is purported to have created Le Jeune Homme et la Mort for his wife-to-be Zizi Jeanmaire, but it was danced by Jean Babilée and Nathalie Philippart at its 25 June 1946 premiere at the Théâtre des Champs-Élysées with costumes by Tom Keogh.

In 1951, Petit staged the ballet at American Ballet Theatre. In 1966, he filmed the ballet in France with Rudolf Nureyev and Zizi Jeanmaire.

Le Jeune Homme et la Mort was revived by Mikhail Baryshnikov at the American Ballet Theatre in 1975 and in the 1985 movie White Nights, in arrangements by Petit for Baryshnikov. It has been in the repertoire of the Paris Opera Ballet since 1990 and was danced at its premiere there by Kader Belarbi. It has also been danced by the Ballet National de Marseilles (1984), the Berlin Opera Ballet (1985), the Boston Ballet (1998), the Bolshoi Ballet (2009), the Mariinsky Ballet (late 1990s, revival 2012) and the English National Ballet (2018).

== Original cast ==
- Nathalie Philippart
- Jean Babilée

== Revivals ==
=== La Scala Ballet, Teatro degli Arcimboldi, Milan, March 2006 ===
- Darcey Bussell
- Roberto Bolle

=== Sadler's Wells, November 2006 ===
- Darcey Bussell
- Igor Zelensky
