= Alice Renavand =

French ballet dancer

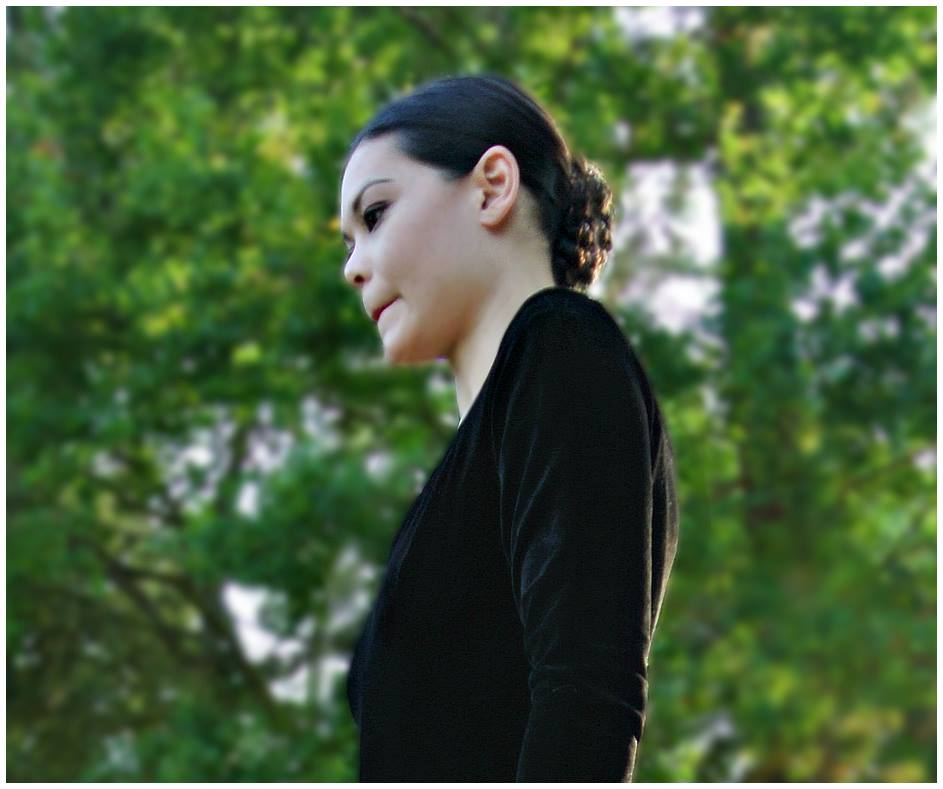
Alice Renavand in 2014

Alice Renavand is a French ballet dancer. After joining the Paris Opera Ballet in 1997, she became a principal in 2012 and a star (danseuse étoile) in December 2013. Shortly afterwards, she was described as having "la beauté du diable" (the beauty of the devil) as Lizzie in Fall River Legend.

== Early life ==
Born in Paris, Renavand has a French father and a Vietnamese mother. Her decision to take up ballet resulted from her father's suggestion that she should make a list of what she would like to do with her spare time. As her first choice was dancing, she took lessons at the Conservatoire de Garches. In 1989, only a few months later, she was admitted to the Paris Opera Ballet School at the age of nine, receiving the support and friendship of Claude Bessy.

== Career ==
After graduating from the Ballet School, Renavand joined the Paris Opera Ballet in 1997. Although she progressed well in the corps de ballet, she had a rough time for the first few years putting on too much weight. Thanks to the encouragement of Brigitte Lefèvre, she was able to revitalize her approach, losing 20 kilograms (44 lb) in a year. Further support came from Angelin Preljocaj in 2004 who allowed her to replace an injured colleague as Creüse in his Le Songe de Médée, giving her more confidence in her abilities. She was then invited by Pina Bausch to dance Eurydice in her Orphée et Eurydice. In the following year, she was given roles in Maurice Béjart's The Rite of Spring, William Forsythe's Approximate Sonata and The Vertiginous Thrill of Exactitude, Jiří Kylián's Bella Figura and Rudolf Nureyev's Don Quixote in which she performed The Street Dancer.

Renavand won the Association pour le rayonnement de l'Opéra national de Paris (AROP) prize in 2008. That year, she danced roles in The Rite of Spring, The House of Bernarda, In the Middle, Somewhat Elevated, Kaguyahime, Phèdre, Les Enfants du paradis, The Three-Cornered Hat, Genus, La Bayadère, Cinderella, Le Jeune homme et la mort, Siddharta, and Psyché. In 2012, she was promoted to principal (première danseuse), performing the roles of Kitri in Nureyev's Don Quixote and the Mistress of Lescaut in Kenneth MacMillan's L'histoire de Manon. In December 2013, she was elevated to the rank of star (danseuse étoile) after dancing the main female role for the first time in Preljocaj's Le Parc.

Renavand was injured on stage during her retirement performance of Giselle on 13 July 2022. She returned to the stage of the Opéra Bastille the following season to give a final performance of Béjart's Boléro on 28 May 2023.
