= Jérémie Bélingard =

French ballet dancer

Jérémie Bélingard (born 19 August 1975 in Paris) is a French ballet dancer who performed with the Paris Opera Ballet as an Étoile. He joined the company at age eighteen in 1991, and became an étoile in March 2007.

Bélingard formally retired from the Paris Opera stage following a performance of Scary beauty, one of his own creations, on 13 May 2017.
