= Agnès Letestu =

French ballet dancer (born 1971)

Agnès Letestu (born 1 February 1971) is a French prima ballerina.

== Biography ==
She decided to start ballet when she saw her first ballet on TV (Swan Lake). Then she had the opportunity to start ballet as a hobby, and her teacher, Mr. Bertin, persuaded her to audition for the Opéra Ballet School which she joined when she was 10. She was a shy but graceful pupil and was destined to be at the top of the company. Agnes entered the Paris Opera Ballet company in 1987 at the age of 16, became Coryphée in 1988, Sujet in 1989 and première danseuse in 1993. She demonstrated her talents to this major ballet company and was named étoile after a performance of Swan Lake in October 1997. As of 2009, Agnes Letestu was nearly at the end of her ballerina career (she was then 38) but she hopes to continue to live her passion for ballet through teaching to the youngest. In October, 2013, she appeared in 'La Dame aux Camelias' at The Paris Opera Ballet in her farewell performance for the company, portraying Marguerite Gautier to great acclaim.

== Among her roles of soloist ==
In the Middle, Somewhat Elevated (Forsythe), Etudes (Lander), Gamzatti in La Bayadère (Petipa/ Nureyev), Glass Pieces (Robbins), Serenade (Balanchine), Le Jeune homme et la Mort (Petit), Bathilde/Myrtha in Mats Ek's Giselle, Odette/Odile in Swan Lake, Terpsichore in Apollo, The pas de deux in Agon.; Marguerite Gautier in La Dame aux Camelias.

== Awards ==
- 1989 : Golden Medal of the Eurovision Dance Prize.
- 1990 : Gold Medal of the Varna International Ballet Competition.
- 2007 : Prix Benois de la Danse.
