= Symphony in C (ballet) =

Ballet by George Balanchine

- Choreographer: George Balanchine
- Music: Georges Bizet
- Premiere: July 28, 1947; Palais Garnier, Paris
- Original ballet company: Paris Opera Ballet
- Design: Leonor Fini
- Genre: Neoclassical ballet

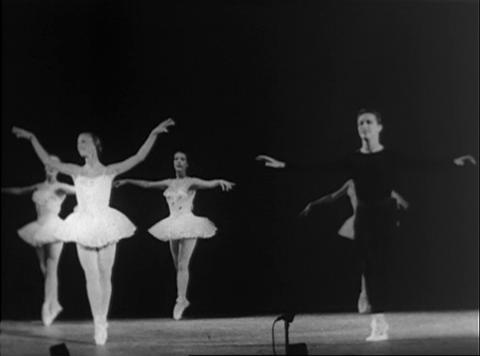
Excerpt from a performance of Symphony in C (NYCB), 1951

Symphony in C, originally titled Le Palais de Cristal, is a ballet choreographed by George Balanchine, to Georges Bizet's Symphony in C. The ballet was originally created for the Paris Opera Ballet, and premiered on July 28, 1947, at the Palais Garnier.

== Production ==
External videos
- Joseph Gordon on George Balanchine's SYMPHONY IN C: Anatomy of a Dance, YouTube video
- Sara Mearns on SYMPHONY IN C: Anatomy of a Dance, YouTube video
- "Le Palais de cristal" (Symphony in C) - George Balanchine, YouTube video

Georges Bizet (1838 – 1875) wrote Symphony in C when he was 17-year-old student, and the score was not found until 1933. Composer Igor Stravinsky informed choreographer George Balanchine about this discovery. In 1947, as a guest ballet master at the Paris Opera Ballet, Balanchine choreographed the ballet, then titled Le Palais de Cristal, to "showcase for the talent of the whole company." Balanchine paid homage to Léo Staats, a French choreographer he admired. According to NYCB, Balanchine created the ballet within two weeks. The following year, he restaged the ballet for Ballet Society, under the title Symphony in C, and this version was featured in New York City Ballet's first program. Choreographer Jerome Robbins was in the audience, and decided to join the company after seeing the ballet.

The ballet has four movements, each featuring a principal couple, two demi-soloist couples and the corps de ballet. In the finale, the whole cast appears on stage. When NYCB was based at the New York City Center, the stage was too small for the entire cast to appear in the finale, but this became possible when the company moved to the New York State Theater.

Symphony in C had since entered the repertories of Royal Danish Ballet, Dutch National Ballet, Stuttgart Ballet, The Royal Ballet, Kirov Ballet and the American Ballet Theatre.

=== Costumes ===
In the original Paris version, each movement references a gemstone, including Rubies, Black Diamonds, Emeralds and Pearls, with the dancers wearing red, black, green and white costumes, designed by Leonor Fini. Balanchine later used this idea again in Jewels.

In 1950, NYCB started donning black-and-white costumes designed by Barbara Karinska. In 2012, NYCB commissioned Marc Happel to design costumes for the ballet that had a "more modern, yet still timeless look". He kept the black and white scheme, and used crystals provided by Swarovski.

The Royal Ballet's production uses costumes and sets by former artistic director Anthony Dowell. Like the Karinska design, men are dressed in black, and women are in white tutus.

== Casts ==
- World premiere: Lycette Darsonval, Alexandre Kalioujny, Tamara Toumanova, Roger Ritz, Micheline Bardin, Michel Renault, Madeleine Lafon, Max Bozzoni
- Ballet Society staging: Maria Tallchief, Nicholas Magallanes, Tanaquil Le Clercq, Francisco Moncion, Beatrice Tompkins, Herbert Bliss, Elise Reiman, John Taras
- American Ballet Theatre premiere: Paloma Herrera, Ethan Stiefel, Nina Ananiashvili, Jose Manuel Carreño, Ashley Tuttle, Angel Corella, Sandra Brown, Sascha Radetsky
- New York City Ballet in Paris (2016): Tiler Peck, Andrew Veyette, Teresa Reichlen, Tyler Angle, Alston Macgill, Anthony Huxley, Brittany Pollack, Taylor Stanley

== Video recordings ==
- 2014: A Paris Opera Ballet performance at the Opéra Bastille with principal dancers Amandine Albisson, Ludmilla Pagliero, Mathieu Ganio, Karl Paquette, Valentine Colasante, Nolwenn Daniel, Audric Bezard, Vincent Chaillet, Arthus Raveau, and Emmanuel Thibault and the Paris Opera Orchestra and Chorus, conducted by Philippe Jordan (as the first part of a double bill with Ravel's Daphnis et Chloé, choreographed by Benjamin Millepied).
- 2016: A NYCB touring performance at Théâtre du Châtelet, Paris, was filmed and released through PBS' Great Performances and on a DVD titled New York City Ballet in Paris.
- 2018: NYCB released a video recording of the first movement, featuring Ashley Bouder and Joseph Gordon, in his New York City debut of the role, in response to performance cancellations due to the coronavirus pandemic.
