= Isabelle Ciaravola =

French ballet dancer

Isabelle Ciaravola (born March 12, 1972) is a French ballet dancer. From 1990, she danced with the Paris Opera Ballet where she rose to the top rank of étoile in 2009. Since retiring from the stage in February 2014, she has devoted most of her time to teaching.

== Early life ==
Born in Ajaccio on March 12, 1972, to Christian and Paulette Ciaravola, she began ballet classes as a child in her native Corsica before she was identified at the age of 13 as having exceptional promise while on a course in continental France. As a result, she studied under Christiane Vaussard at the Conservatoire de Paris, winning the First Prize in 1988 at the age of 16. She joined the Paris Opera Ballet School, where she graduated two years later.

== Career ==
Ciaravola became a member of the Paris Opera Ballet in 1990, only the second Corsican to do so, after Marie-Claude Pietragalla. It was quite some time before her talents were fully recognized. Only in 2003 did she become a première danseuse which allowed her to dance as a leading soloist, with opportunities for deciding which works she wanted to pursue. Among her preferences were Roland Petit's Clavigo, John Neumeier's Lady of the Camellias and Troisième Symphonie de Gustav Mahler, and Kenneth MacMillan's L'Histoire de Manon.

In addition to roles in the classical works, since 2004 she danced the leads in Patrice Bart's La Petite danseuse de Degas, George Balanchine's Emeraudes/Joyaux, Serenade, Liebeslieder Walzer and The Four Temperaments and as Nikiya in Rudolf Nureyev's La Bayadère. In 2009, after the first performance of John Cranko's, Oneguin, Ciaravola and her dance partner, Mathias Heymann, were promoted to étoile. She taught at the Ballet Masterclasses in Prague.

== Future plans ==
Ciaravola had ankle surgery in 2010. After being a member of the Paris ballet for 24 years, she retired from the stage in February 2014 receiving a thirty-minute standing ovation. She hoped to contribute her wide experience and repertoire by teaching new entrants to the profession. She is now associated with the Prix Isabelle Ciaravola which is designed to provide encouragement to young ballet dancers.

== Awards ==
Ciaravola has received the following awards and decorations:

- 1988: First prize, Conservatoire de Paris
- 2011: Chevalier des arts et des lettres
- 2012: Chevalier de la légion d'honneur
