= José Carlos Martínez (dancer) =

Spanish ballet dancer and choreographer

José Carlos Martínez (born 29 April 1969 in Cartagena) is a Spanish dancer and choreographer. He was a danseur étoile of the Paris Opera Ballet and artistic director of the Spanish National Dance Company. He became the director of dance at Paris Opera Ballet in December 2022.

Throughout his career, he has won numerous ballet awards and competitions, such as the Prix Benois de la Danse, the Gold medal of the Varna International Ballet Competition, and a scholarship of Prix de Lausanne, among the most prestigious dance competitions in the world. The Japanese Shinshokan Dance Magazine recognized him as one of the best dancers of his era.

Martínez studied dance with Pilar Molina in Cartagena, before attending the École supérieure de danse de Cannes Rosella Hightower. In 1987, he won a scholarship from Prix de Lausanne and entered the Paris Opera Ballet School. He joined the Paris Opera Ballet in 1988 and was named Danseur Étoile in 1997. In 1992, he was awarded the Gold medal of the Varna International Ballet Competition and in 1999, he received the Premio Nacional de Danza.

He danced the major classical ballets such as Swan Lake, Giselle, Don Quixote, La Bayadère, The Sleeping Beauty, Raymonda, Paquita, The Nutcracker, La Sylphide, Romeo and Juliet, as well as neoclassical ballets by Frederick Ashton, George Balanchine, Kenneth MacMillan, Yury Grigorovich, Antony Tudor, Serge Lifar, Harald Lander, and John Cranko. Martínez also danced contemporary pieces by Maurice Béjart, John Neumeier, Mats Ek, William Forsythe, Jiří Kylián, Martha Graham, Roland Petit, and Pina Bausch.

He performed internationally as guest artist with renowned dance companies including: the Bolshoi Ballet, Mariinsky Ballet, Ballet Nacional de Cuba, English National Ballet, La Scala Theatre Ballet, Tokyo Ballet, Ballet de Bordeaux, Teatro dell'Opera di Roma, the Berlin Staatsoper, and l'Opéra de Nice.

In 2008, initiating a series of shows under the artistic project José Martínez in Compañía, Martínez's project showcased in Spain numerous Spanish soloists who had carried out their careers abroad. The shows included renowned dancers Lucía Lacarra, Tamara Rojo, Alicia Amatrian, and Iván Gil-Ortega, as well as provided an opportunity to lesser-known young Spanish dancers to dance in their home country again.

In 2002, Martinez began choreographing, completing eight ballets since and receiving the Prix Benois de la Danse as choreographer for Les Enfants du Paradis in 2009. His latest, from 2010, entitled Marco Polo, the last Mission was commissioned by the Ballet of Shanghai during the Shanghai World's Fair.

In December 2010, Martinez was named artistic director of the Spanish National Dance Company. He held the post for eight years. In October 2022, the Paris Opera Ballet announced that he is scheduled to become the director of dance, effective in December.

In 2025 and 2026, Martinez staged Don Quixote ballet after Petipa and Gorsky at Brno and Belgrade respectively.

== Awards ==
- 1987 Prix de Lausanne
- 1992 Gold medal of the Varna International Ballet Competition
- 1991 Prix de l'AROP
- 1992 Prix Carpeaux
- 1988 Premio Danza e Danza de la Critica Italiana
- 1988 Premio Léonide Massine-Positano (Italy) for The Three-Cornered Hat
- 1999 Premio Nacional de Danza de España
- 2000 Gold medal of the city of Cartagena
- 2005 Prix Elegance et Talent France/Chine
- 2005 Premio de las Artes Escenicas (Valencia)
- 2009 Prix Benois de la Danse for Les Enfants du Paradis
- Officier des Arts et Lettres .

== Filmography ==
- 2003 Paquita, Paris Opera Ballet
- 2005 Swan Lake, Paris Opera Ballet
- 2005 Appartement, Paris Opera Ballet
- 2006 Sylvia, Paris Opera Ballet
- 2008 La Dame aux Camélias, Paris Opera Ballet
- 2011 Coppélia, Paris Opera Ballet
- 2011 La Petite danseuse de Degas, Paris Opera Ballet
