= Emmanuel Thibault =

French dancer (born 1974)

Emmanuel Thibault (born 1974) is a French ballet dancer who danced with the Paris Opera from 1990 to 2017.

After early studies with Max Bozzoni, he was admitted to the Paris Opera Ballet School and was educated there.

At the age of fifteen, Thibault joined the Paris Opera, thereupon becoming a student of the ballerina Noëlla Pontois, with whom he continues to work to this day. Appointed Soloist (sujet) at the age of seventeen, he was appointed Principal (premier danseur) following the Internal Promotion Contest (Concours interne de promotion) on December 23, 2004.

Since 2004, Thibault has been working closely with the première danseuse Myriam Ould-Braham, and has danced with her all over Europe.

== Awards ==
- Silver medal, Concours international de danse de Paris – 1990
- Gold, Eurovision Young Dancers' Competition, Helsinki – 1991
- Prix Espoir, Association pour le Rayonnement de l’Opéra de Paris (AROP) – 1994
- Silver medal – Varna Competition (date unknown), Prix de l’AROP – 2002
- Léonide Massine Prize (with Myriam Ould-Braham) – 2005.

== Principal roles ==
- The Faun in Jerome Robbins's ‘The Four Seasons’;
- ‘Le Spectre de la rose’ by Michel Fokine, staged by Pierre Lacotte;
- Puck in John Neumeier's ‘Midsummer Night's Dream’;
- Grand pas de Trois in ‘Paquita’ by Marius Petipa, staged by Pierre Lacotte;
- Bronze Idol, in ‘La Bayadère’, staged by Rudolf Nureyev;
- Grand pas de trois in Act I of ‘The Swan Lake’, staged by Rudolf Nureyev;
- The Bluebird, in ‘The Sleeping Beauty’ by Marius Petipa, staged by Rudolf Nureyev;
- Peasant Pas de deux in ‘Giselle’ by Jules Perrot, staged by Patrice Bart;
- Mercutio in ‘Romeo and Juliet’, choreography by Rudolf Nureyev;
- Basilio in ‘Don Quixote’, staged by Rudolf Nureyev; The Bluebird in Carla Fracci's Staging of "The Sleeping Beauty" at the Rome Opera; Prince Désiré in the Inoue Ballet Foundation's staging of "The Sleeping *Beauty" at Tokyo, the Prince in the Inoue Ballet Foundation's staging of "Cendrillon" at Tokyo; Colas in Frederick Ashton's staging of "La Fille mal gardée" for the Paris Opera.

== Films ==
- Serge Peretti, le dernier des Italiens, film by Dominique Delouche (Le Tambourin)
- Paquita, Grand pas de trois, Act I (Paris Opera Ballet, Lacotte), with Mlles. Daniel and Hurel
- The Swan Lake, Grand pas de trois, Act I (Paris Opera Ballet, Nureyev) with Mlles. Daniel and Gilbert
- Jewels, Pas de trois, Emeralds Section (Paris Opera Ballet, Balanchine) with Mlles. Abbagnato and Daniel.
- Giselle, Pas de deux des Paysans (with Myriam Ould-Braham) (Paris Opera Ballet, Perrot/Bart)
