= Patrice Bart =

French dancer and choreographer (1945–2025)

- Born: 30 July 1945; Paris, France
- Died: 6 October 2025 (aged 80); Falaise, France
- Education: Paris Opera Ballet School
- Occupations: Dancer; Choreographer

Patrice Bart (French: [patʁis baʁ]; 30 July 1945 – 6 October 2025) was a French dancer and choreographer.

== Life and career ==
Born in Paris on 30 July 1945, Bart entered dance school at the age of 12. He entered stardom in 1969 at the Moscow International Ballet Competition as principal dancer, where he won the gold medal. He was named danseur étoile in 1972 in Swan Lake. He went on to become a star dancer at the Paris Opera Ballet from 1987 to 2011. His ballet style was similar to that of Rudolf Nureyev. In addition to dancing, he notably choreographed La Petite Danseuse de Degas in 2003.

Bart died in Falaise on 6 October 2025, at the age of 80.

== Distinctions ==
- Prix Nijinski (1974)
- Knight of the Legion of Honour
- Officer of the Ordre national du Mérite
- Officer of the Ordre des Arts et des Lettres
