= Kader Belarbi =

French ballet dancer

Kader Belarbi (born 1962) is a French ballet dancer, choreographer and director. He spent his whole career in the Paris National Opera Ballet, between 1980 and 2008, and belongs to the company’s “Nureyev generation”, having been made an étoile (principal) by Rudolf Nureyev in 1989.

Since 2012, he has been Director of Dance at the Toulouse Capitol Theatre, heading the Capitol Ballet.

== Career ==
Belarbi’s repertoire as a dancer includes a wide range of classical as well as neoclassical and contemporary works, a number of which he premiered for prominent contemporary choreographers in Paris and as a guest artist in other companies. He himself choreographed around forty works. In the past few years, he has undertaken to revisit the academic repertoire, bringing le Corsaire to France and producing a revised version of Giselle.

On 1 February 2011, he was appointed Director of Dance at the Théâtre du Capitole. He took up his post as Director of Ballet du Capitole on 1 August 2012. He was Director of Dance at the Théâtre du Capitole from 2012 to 2023.

== Choreographies ==
Paris National Opera Ballet

- 1991: Giselle et Willy
- 1997: Salle des pas perdus
- 1998: les Saltimbanques
- 2002: Hurlevent
- 2008: Formeries

Grands Ballets canadiens (Montreal)

- 2004: les Épousés
- 2005: la Bête et la Belle

National Ballet of China

- 2007: Entrelacs

Grand Théâtre de Genève Ballet

- 2007: le Mandarin merveilleux

Toulouse Capitol Ballet

- 2010: Liens de table
- 2010: À nos amours
- 2011: la Reine morte
- 2012: Étranges Voisins
- 2013: le Corsaire
- 2014: Bach-Suite III
- 2015: Giselle
- 2016: Mur-Mur
