= Claude Bessy (dancer) =

French ballet dancer (1932–2026)

Claude Bessy

Claude Bessy (21 October 1932 – 23 April 2026) was a French ballerina, ballet master of the Paris Opera Ballet (1970–1971), and director of the Paris Opera Ballet School (1972–2004).

== Life and career ==
Bessy was born Claude Jean Andrée Durand in Paris on 21 October, 1932. She later took the surname of her grandfather, the actor Paul Bessy. Bessy trained at the Paris Opera Ballet School from the age of ten, the youngest student ever admitted, and joined the Paris Opera Ballet at age 13, the youngest danseuse ever admitted. In 1956, she was promoted to étoile, the Ballet's highest rank. Bessy was closely associated with Serge Lifar and created leading roles in his 1951 Snow White, 1955 Noces fantastiques, and 1958 Daphnis and Chloe. She worked with John Cranko, who made his 1955 La Belle Hêlène on her, and George Skibine, who made a second Daphnis and Chloe based on Bessy in 1959.

She was featured in Gene Kelly's film Invitation to the Dance (1956), and four years later he created Pas de dieux at the Paris Opera for her. She also made many television appearances. Bessy staged ballets for the Comédie Française and Opéra Comique, danced for the musical My Fair Lady (1984), and staged the ballets of Lifar throughout Europe.

As director of the Paris Opera Ballet School beginning in 1972, she introduced profound reforms to the teaching regime which led to the birth of a new generation of highly technical dancers like Sylvie Guillem, Patrick Dupond, Élisabeth Platel, and Marie-Claude Pietragalla, and succeeded in organising the construction of a new school building in Nanterre inaugurated in 1987.

Bessy was named to France's Ordre national du Mérite (dignity of the Grand Cross, its highest class), in 2009.

Bessy died at her home in the Paris suburb of Chatou on 23 April 2026, at the age of 93.

== Publications ==
- Danseuse étoile, 1961
- Claude Bessy présente les Ballets classiques de sa vie, Ed. Hors Collection, 2009. ISBN 978-2-258-07839-0

== Honors ==
- Pavlova Prize (1961)
- Légion d'honneur (1972).
