= Nicolas Le Riche =

French ballet dancer

Nicolas Le Riche (born 29 January 1972, in Sartrouville, Yvelines) is a French ballet dancer, choreographer and ballet director.

== Biography ==
Le Riche entered the Paris Opera Ballet school at age ten and joined the corps de ballet six years later; his first ròle was in Gsovsky's Grand Pas Classique. He was promoted to sujet in 1990 and premier danseur in 1991. Balletmaster Rudolf Nureyev cast him as Mercutio and subsequently Romeo in his version of Romeo and Juliet, also in his Raymonda; he then performed in Nijinska's Le Train Bleu, in Robbins' In the Night, Neumeier's Vaslaw, Lander's Etudes, Nureyev's La Bayadère, Nijinsky's Afternoon of a Faun, Mats Ek's version of Giselle, Boléro by Maurice Béjart and Petit's Le Jeune Homme et la Mort and Les Forains.

He was promoted to the Paris Opera Ballet's highest rank, that of étoile (literally, star), after his debut in the róle of Albrecht in the traditional version of Giselle. He performed A Suite of Dances as guest artist at New York City Ballet's Jerome Robbins celebration in June 2008. As choreographer he has made ballets since 2001, including Caligula to Vivaldi's The Four Seasons in 2005. World-renowned choreographers such as Mats Ek, Jiri Kylian, William Forsythe and John Neumeier have created works especially for Le Riche. He has danced on prestigious stages such as The Royal Opera House in London, the Bolshoi Theatre in Moscow, the Mariinsky Theatre in Saint Petersburg, La Scala in Milan and the Royal Danish Opera in Copenhagen.

Nicolas Le Riche retired from the Paris Opera Ballet following a gala performance on 9 July 2014. He has henceforth primarily been working as a choreographer. In 2015 he created and served as the co-director of L'Atelier de l'Art Chorégraphique (LAAC) at the Théâtre des Champs-Elysées in Paris, after which he entered the position as head of the Royal Swedish Ballet in Stockholm by August 2017.

== Awards ==
- 1995 : Prix Benois de la Danse
- Nijinsky Award
- Chevalier of Arts and Letters

== Articles ==
- Royal Ballet guest principals, Ballet Magazine
- Telegraph, 13 November 2005
- Fascineshion interview
