= Myriam Ould-Braham =

French ballet dancer (born 1982)

Myriam Ould-Braham (born January 1982) is a French ballet dancer. After joining the Paris Opera Ballet in 1999, she became a première danseuse (principal) in 2005 and was elevated to the rank of étoile (star) in 2012.

== Early life ==
Born in Paris, Ould-Braham's father is Algerian, her mother French. Taking an early interest in gymnastics in Algiers, she later turned to dance, finding it was more fun to move about with music. In 1993 she began ballet lessons with Yvonne Goubé at the Salle Pleyel before attending the Conservatoire de Paris in 1995. The following year, she was admitted to the Paris Opera Ballet School where she was awarded the Chausson d'Or prize. In 1998, with the school troupe, she danced La Sylphide in David Lichine's Le Bal des cadets and in 1999, she performed Gourouli in Albert Aveline's Les Deux Pigeons.

== Career ==
Ould-Braham joined the Paris Opera Ballet in 2001. She was soon selected to take part in Roland Petit's Les Forains, to dance Aurore in The Sleeping Beauty and the Pas de Deux in the Coralli/Perrot version of Giselle.

After being promoted to première danseuse in 2005, her repertoire included Lise in Frederick Ashton's La Fille mal gardée, Calliope in George Balanchine's Apollo, and Naïla in Jean-Guillaume Bart's La Source. She has also enjoyed the role of Manon in Kenneth MacMillan's L'histoire de Manon as well as the Neo-Classical ballets of William Forsythe and Wayne McGregor.

At the curtain call on 18 June 2012, following her performance as Lise in La Fille mal gardée, Myriam Ould-Braham was elevated to the rank of étoile.

Ould-Braham retired from the Paris Opera Ballet following a performance of the title role in Giselle on 18 May 2024.

Ould-Braham has received three major awards: Cercle Carpeaux Prize (2002), Leonide Massine Positano Dance Award (2005), and AROP Prize (2005).
