= Aurélie Dupont =

French ballet dancer and director

Aurélie Dupont (born 15 January 1973 in Paris) is a French ballet dancer who performed with the Paris Opera Ballet as an Étoile.

She began her career in dance in 1983 when she entered the Paris Opera Ballet School (L’École de danse de l’Opéra de Paris). She joined the company at age sixteen in 1989, and became a première danseuse in December 1996. Dupont was promoted to star dancer (Étoile) in 1998 after her performance as Kitri in Paris Opera Ballet's revival of Nureyev's production of Don Quixote. She has also starred in Paris Opera Ballet's revival of Nureyev's version of The Sleeping Beauty.

In 2010, Cédric Klapisch released a documentary about Dupont, L'espace d'un instant, which had been made over the previous two years.

Dupont formally retired from the Paris Opera stage following a performance of Kenneth MacMillan's Manon on 18 May 2015. It was announced on 5 Feb 2016 that she would be the next director of dance for the Paris Opera Ballet after the resignation of Benjamin Millepied. In June 2022, Dupont announced that she would leave the company the following month.

== Repertoire ==
Dupont's repertoire includes:

- Don Quixote
- La Bayadère
- Sylvia
- Giselle
- Swan Lake
- Romeo and Juliet
- The Sleeping Beauty
- Raymonda
- Les Sylphides
- La Sylphide
- The Four Temperaments
- Manon
- Onegin

== Awards ==
- 1992 : Gold medallist at the Varna International Ballet Competition (category juniors)
- 1993 : Winner of the French Prix du Cercle Carpeaux
- 1994 : Winner of the AROP (Association pour le rayonnement de l'Opéra national de Paris)
- 2002 : Prix Benois de la Danse
- 2005 : Chevalier of the Ordre des Arts et des Lettres

== Media ==
=== Book ===
- Dupont, Aurélie (2024). N’oublie pas pourquoi tu danses (Memoir) (in French). Paris: Albin Michel. ISBN 978-2-226-48691-2. — Covers her training and dancing career.

=== Documentary ===
- Klapisch, Cédric (2010). Aurélie Dupont, l’espace d’un instant (in French). Paris: Les Films d’ici / Ce qui me meut. Duration 55 min – via Slice (YouTube).

=== Performances ===
Paris Opera Ballet

- 1999: The Sleeping Beauty, vers. by Rudolf Nureyev, with Manuel Legris.
- 2002: Don Quixote, vers. by Rudolf Nureyev, with Manuel Legris.
- 2004: La Sylphide, vers. by Pierre Lacotte, with Mathieu Ganio.
- 2005: Sylvia, vers. by John Neumeier.
- 2010: Siddharta, by Angelin Preljocaj, with Nicolas Le Riche.
- 2012: La Bayadère, vers. by Rudolf Nureyev, with Josua Hoffalt.
- 2012: Romeo and Juliet, by Sasha Waltz, with Hervé Moreau.
- 2015: L'histoire de Manon, by Kenneth MacMillan, with Roberto Bolle — farewell performance.

Other

- 2019: Written on Water (dance film), by Pontus Lidberg, with Alexander Jones (Ballett Zürich).
