= Paris Opera Ballet =

French ballet company

- Logo of the Paris Opera

General information
- Name: Paris Opera Ballet
- Local name: Ballet de l'Opéra national de Paris
- Previous names: Académie Royale de Musique; Académie Impériale de Musique; Théâtre National de l'Opéra
- Year founded: 1661; 365 years ago
- Principal venue: Palais Garnier, Place de l'Opéra, Paris, 9th arrondissement, France
- Website: www.operadeparis.fr

Senior staff
- Administrator: Flavien Moglia
- Director: José Martínez

Other
- Associated schools: Paris Opera Ballet School
- Formation: Étoile; Premier Danseur; Sujet; Coryphée; Quadrille

The Paris Opera Ballet (French: Ballet de l'Opéra national de Paris) is a French ballet company that is an integral part of the Paris Opera. It is the oldest national ballet company, and many European and international ballet companies can trace their origins to it. It is still regarded as one of the most prominent ballet companies in the world, together with the Bolshoi Ballet in Moscow and the Royal Ballet in London.

Since December 2022, the company has been under the direction of José Martínez, the director of dance. The ballet company consists of 154 dancers, among them 17 Danseurs Étoiles. The principal dancers give 180 dance performances each year, primarily at the Palais Garnier.

Just as prestigious as the Paris Opera Ballet is its dance school, the Paris Opera Ballet School (French: École de danse de l'Opéra national de Paris), considered to be one of the world's best dance schools. Its former pupils have won a record of 20 Benois de la Danse awards. The school celebrated its tercentennial in 2013.

The competition for admission to both institutions is extremely fierce. For a dancer to enter the Paris Opera Ballet, it is almost compulsory to be admitted to the Paris Opera Ballet School, to pass the annual competitive examinations in May, and to attend at least the final two classes. 95 percent of the admitted dancers in the Paris Opera Ballet are French.

== History ==
=== Naming ===
The Paris Opera Ballet has always been an integral part of the Paris Opera, which was founded in 1669 as the Académie d'Opéra (Academy of Opera), although theatrical dance did not become an important component of the Paris Opera until 1673, after it was renamed the Académie Royale de Musique (Royal Academy of Music) and placed under the leadership of Jean-Baptiste Lully. The Paris Opera has had many different official names during its long history, but since 1994, it has been called the Opéra National de Paris (Paris National Opera).

=== Background ===
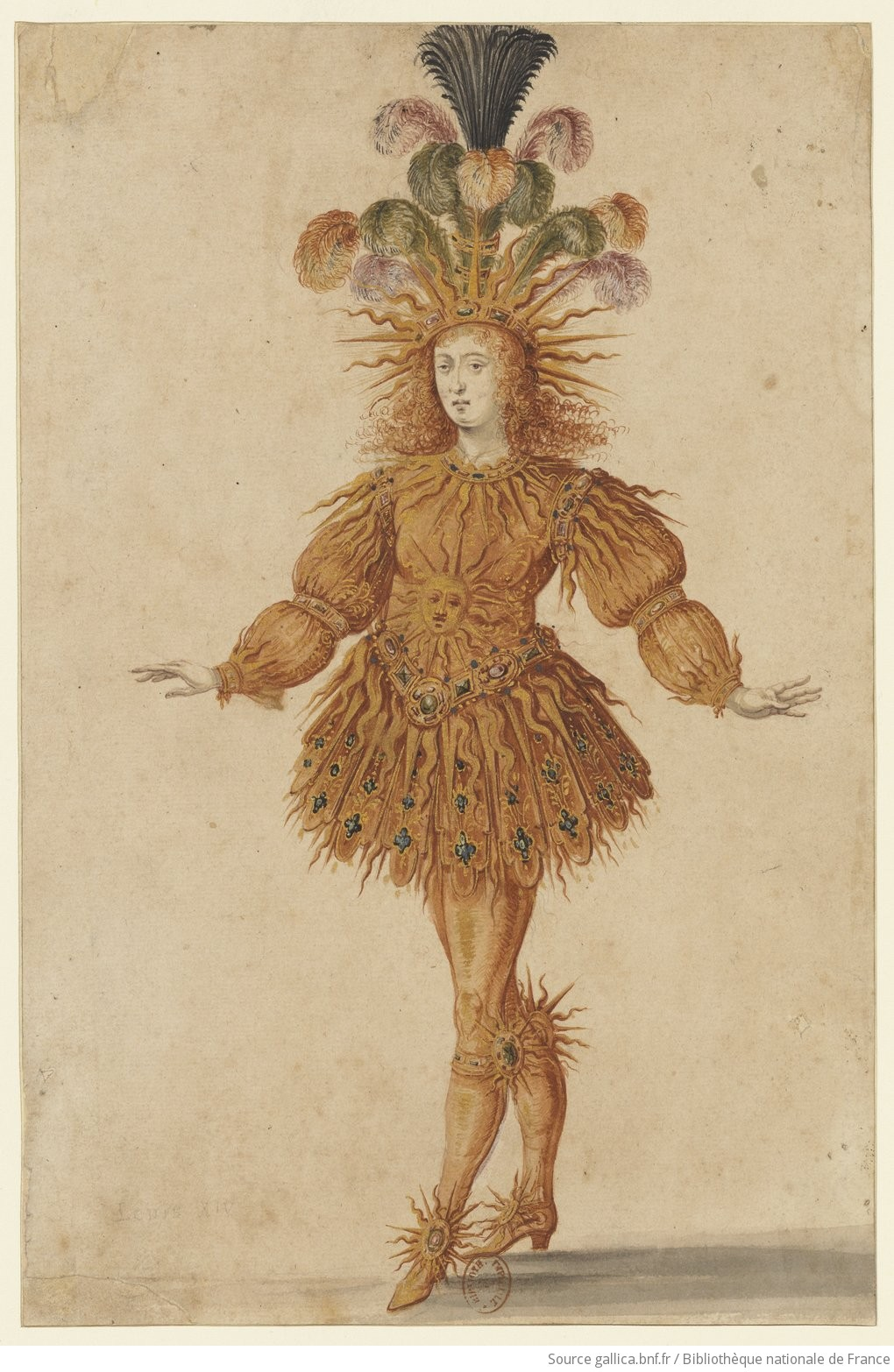
Louis XIV as Apollo in the Ballet Royal de la Nuit (1653)

The Paris Opera Ballet had its origins in the earlier dance institutions, traditions and practices of the court of Louis XIV. Of particular importance were the series of comédies-ballets created by Molière with, among others, the choreographers and composers Pierre Beauchamps and Jean-Baptiste Lully. The first was Les Fâcheux in 1661 and the most important, Le Bourgeois gentilhomme in 1670. Many of these were also performed by Molière's company at the public Théâtre du Palais-Royal in Paris, which was later to become the first permanent home of the opera company and the opera ballet.

Also in 1661, Louis XIV had founded the Académie Royale de Danse (Royal Academy of Dance) in an effort "to improve the quality of dance instruction for court entertainments". Members of the academy, as well as the dance teachers who were certified by it, and their students, participated in creating the ballets for the court, Molière, and later the opera. In 1680, Beauchamps became the chancellor (director) of the Académie Royale de Danse. Although the Académie Royale de Danse and the Opera were closely connected, the two institutions remained separate, and the former disappeared with the fall of the monarchy in 1792.

=== Founding and early history ===
On 28 June 1669, Louis XIV granted a privilege to the poet Pierre Perrin giving him a monopoly to form a separate academy for the performance of opera in French. The first production of the company founded by Perrin, the Académie d'Opéra (Academy of Opera), was Pomone, which was first performed on 3 March 1671 at the Jeu de Paume de la Bouteille and included ballets choreographed by Anthoine des Brosses.

In 1672, Lully purchased Perrin's privilege and also obtained new letters patent limiting the use of musicians and dancers by other French companies. With Anthoine des Brosses and Lully as choreographers and Carlo Vigarani as stage designer, Lully's company, now called the Académie Royale de Musique, produced Lully's first opera, Les fêtes de l'Amour et de Bacchus (a pastorale) in November 1672 at the Jeu de Paume de Béquet. This work consisted primarily of excerpts from Lully's prior court ballets connected with new entrées choreographed by des Brosses. A crucial difference, however, from the previous court ballets was that the members of the court no longer participated, and all of the dancers were professionals.

Lully's next production, Cadmus et Hermione (27 April 1673), the first tragédie lyrique (with a libretto by Philippe Quinault), also premiered at the Jeu de Paume de Béquet and was choreographed by Anthoine des Brosses. Pierre Beauchamps, who had been working with Molière at the Palais-Royal, joined Lully's company in June 1673 (not long after Molière's death), when Lully took over the Palais-Royal theatre, forcing Molière's troupe to move to the Théâtre Guénégaud. Lully and Quinault continued to collaborate on a series of successful productions, in the process creating a new genre of French opera in which dance interludes played an important part in the musical drama. The ballets for these works were created by Beauchamps, des Brosses, and d'Olivet. Jean-Baptiste Dubos explains that Beauchamps and des Brosses were responsible for the ballets ordinaires, while d'Olivet specialized in ballet-pantomime:

Lully paid such great attention to the ballets mentioned here that he engaged for their choreography a 'maître de danse particulier' named d'Olivet. It was he, and not des Brosses or Beauchamps, whom Lully engaged for the 'ballets ordinaires', who composed the ballets of the infernal scenes of Psyché and Alceste. It was also d'Olivet who composed the ballet of the old men in Thésée, of the baneful dreams in Atys, and of the tremblers in Isis. This last was composed solely of pantomimic gestures by men seized with cold, and he did not introduce a single usual dance step into it.

Initially the dancers of the Paris Opera Ballet were all male. Mademoiselle de la Fontaine (1665–1738) became the first professional ballerina when she danced in the premiere of Lully's ballet Le Triomphe de l'Amour on 21 January 1681. Pierre Beauchamps continued to collaborate with Lully at the Paris Opera until Lully's death in 1687.

=== Subsequent history ===
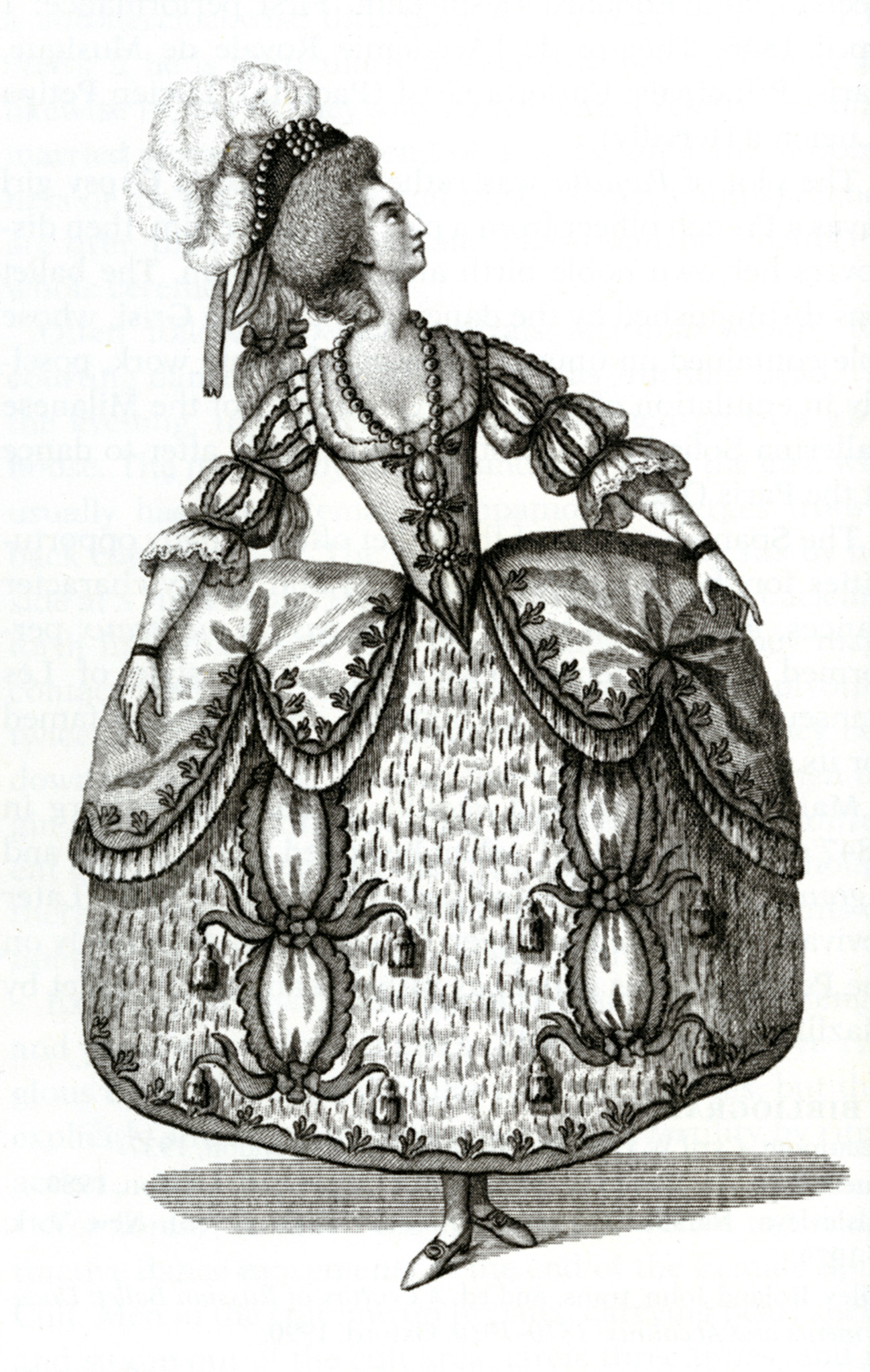
Adelaïde Simonet as the Princess in the pantomime-ballet Ninette à la cour, first produced by the Paris Opera Ballet in 1778 with choreography by Maximilien Gardel, as performed in London in 1781

The 18th century saw the creation of an associated school, now referred to as the Paris Opera Ballet School (French: École de Danse de l’Opéra de Paris), which opened in 1713. The operas of Rameau, and later Gluck, raised standards for the dancers. Jean-Georges Noverre was a particularly influential ballet master from 1776 to 1781. He created the ballet Les petits riens in 1778 on Mozart's music. Maximilien Gardel was ballet master from 1781, with his brother Pierre Gardel taking over after Maximilien's death in 1787. Pierre Gardel survived the Revolution creating ballets such as La Marseillaise and Offrande à la Liberté. He remained the ballet master until 1820 and continued to work up to 1829.

In 1820, Pierre Gardel was succeeded as ballet master by Jean-Louis Aumer, who was however highly criticized for using too much mime and failing to use choreography which furthered plot or character. In 1821, the company moved to a new house, the Salle Le Peletier, where Romantic ballet was born. In 1875, the company moved to the Palais Garnier, where it continues to perform.

=== Serge Lifar as ballet director ===
In 1929, Jacques Rouché invited 24-year-old dancer Serge Lifar to become the maitre de ballet of the Paris Opéra Ballet, which had fallen into decline in the late 19th century.

As ballet master from 1930 to 1944, and from 1947 to 1958, he devoted himself to the restoration of the technical level of the Opéra Ballet, returning it to its place as one of the best companies in the world.

Lifar gave the company a new strength and purpose, initiating the rebirth of ballet in France, and began to create the first of many ballets for that company. During his three decades as director of the Paris Opéra Ballet, Lifar led the company through the turbulent times of World War II and the German occupation of France. Lifar brought the Paris Opéra Ballet to America and performed to full houses at the New York City Center. Audiences were enthusiastic and had great admiration for the company of dancers.

=== Era of Rudolf Nureyev ===
In the world of ballet, Rudolf Nureyev is regarded as the greatest classical dancer ever and as one of the most preeminent choreographers. In 1983, Rudolf Nureyev was appointed director of the Paris Opera Ballet, where, as well as directing, he continued to dance and to promote younger dancers.

The top female ballet dancer at that time, if not of all times, was Sylvie Guillem, who was nominated principal dancer at the age of 19 by Rudolf Nureyev in 1984. They were an exceptional dance couple. The years of Nureyev marked a golden era of the Paris Opera Ballet.

=== Brigitte Lefèvre ===
Brigitte Lefèvre, director from 1995 to 2014, with Patrice Bart as maitre de ballet from 1990 to 2011, succeeded to maintain the high standard that Nureyev has set.

Brigitte Lefèvre invited some of the most preeminent choreographers, such as William Forsythe, Angelin Preljocaj, Saburo Teshigawara, and John Neumeier.

=== Transition ===
There were turbulent times for the company with Benjamin Millepied, director of the Paris Opera Ballet from November 2014 until he quit on 15 July 2016. There were two stumbling blocks with Millepied, a French dancer and choreographer, who left France in 1993, at the age of 16, got his main professional education as a dancer and choreographer in the United States and came back to France in 2014 as newly appointed director of the Paris Opera Ballet. The first one was that Millepied wanted the Paris Opera Ballet dancers to interpret La Bayadère, a classic ballet choreographed by Rudolf Nureyev in 1992, like a contemporary ballet. To achieve this goal, he had already hired guest principal dancers to present La Bayadère.

The other stumbling block was that Millepied had broken the hierarchy of the "Danseurs Étoiles" dancing the leading roles, as he had chosen for the cast of his first contemporary ballet creation "Clear, Loud, Bright, Forward" (the first one in his time as director) out of the 154 danseurs a "dream team" of 16 dancers which he considered to be the fittest to put to practice his ideas and visions (on the programming, the dream team was named "United visual artists"). Karl Paquette, principal dancer, said in an interview that he had never felt as bad in his 30 years at the Paris Opera Ballet as he had the past 6 months. Stéphane Bullion, principal dancer, added that it was clear that things could not be straightened out.

Stéphane Lissner, the Paris Opera director who hired Benjamin Millepied in January 2013 — and who has final authority on decisions about budget, hiring and promotion — said at a news conference at the Palais Garnier on Thursday 4 February 2016 that he had no regrets about that choice. “He leaves too soon, but others leave too late.” Lissner added, “I think that the two jobs, director of dance and a choreographer who is more and more in demand, not just at the Opera, raised a certain number of questions.”

=== Aurélie Dupont ===
Aurélie Dupont took over the direction of the ballet company on 1 August 2016. She was Danseuse Étoile from 1994 to 2015.

Dupont was the inspiration behind the Cédric Klapisch film about the star, considered the grande dame of the Paris Opera Ballet.

Dupond is stepped down from the position on 31 July 2022, as announced in June of that year.

=== José Martínez ===
José Martínez took over the company in December 2022.

== Hierarchy ==
The hierarchy of the Paris Opera Ballet is very strict. For a dancer, it is virtually compulsory to enter first the Paris Opera Ballet School. As Mathilde Froustey put it: "You cannot get into the company if you have not done the school". The competition for admission to both institutions is extremely fierce, as well as the competition for the highest ranks in the ballet company.

More than 90 percent of the candidates don't pass the Ballet School entrance examination, and 20 percent of its pupils have to leave at the end of the year after failing the annual competitive examinations ("les concours annuels") in May. Only 5 to 20 percent of the Ballet School graduates are accepted in the Paris Opera Ballet, initially as dancers on trial (the "stagiaires").

To become a regular member of the Paris Opera Ballet as "Quadrille" (fifth and lowest rank in the hierarchy), one has to pass the annual competitive examination in November. Promotion to the next rank depends exclusively on success in the following annual competitive examinations ("les concours internes de promotion") in front of a board of judges. To achieve the highest rank as Danseur Étoile (only by nomination), dancers have to perform in leading roles as "Premier Danseur" for many years before being nominated due to outstanding excellence and merit.

== Small scandals and the lost generation ==
As the Paris Opera Ballet has a large quantity of first-class French dancers, there are hard times for those who have not been promoted to the highest ranks as dancers or have not been appointed afterwards to positions for which they would have been extremely qualified.

Mathilde Froustey, Sujet from 2005 till 2013, left the Paris Opera Ballet in July 2013 and joined the San Francisco Ballet as a principal dancer because there was no chance for her becoming eventually Danseuse étoile (principal dancer) in this company. In November 2014 Benjamin Millepied, a former principal dancer of the New York City Ballet and French, took over the direction of the company and promised a change: "They asked for a change and they will get a change." When Benjamin Millepied nominated for the first (and only) time a "Danseuse étoile", Laura Hecquet was chosen. Laura Hecquet and Mathilde Froustey were described in the press as "the lost generation" of dancers working up the ranks who have become soloist (Sujet) but have been unlucky for years as far as climbing up the last step of the career ladder is concerned.

The Paris Opera Ballet School has churned out some of the most famous dancers of all time, such as Sylvie Guillem and Laurent Hilaire.

Yet Sylvie Guillem, being principal dancer since 1984, left the company in 1989 at the age of 24 because she wanted more freedom, the right to perform with other companies, an arrangement the management of the Paris Opera Ballet declined.

Laurent Hilaire was highly appreciated as principal dancer. After his farewell as a dancer he continued his career in the company attaining in 2011 the second-highest position as "Maitre de ballet associated to the direction". Laurent Hilaire was the favourite of Brigitte Lefèvre, director of the ballet, and Nicolas Joel, director of the Paris Opera at the time. In January 2013 Stéphane Lissner the new director of the Paris Opera (in the hierarchy above the Paris Opera Ballet's director) appointed Benjamin Millepied. Hilaire announced in May 2014 his departure and quit the company in July. The Paris Opera Ballet's new director Benjamin Millepied on his part stayed only two seasons and was followed in August by Aurélie Dupont, who was as Danseuse étoile the Grand-dame of the Paris Opera Ballet.

== Paris Opera Ballet School ==
The Paris Opera Ballet School (French: École de danse de l'Opéra national de Paris) is one of the most preeminent dance schools in the world. It has six classes for boys and girls separately named sixième division to première division.

In 1987, the Paris Opera Ballet School moved from the Palais Garnier (where most of the Paris Opera ballets take place) to a new building located 10 kilometres west of the centre of Paris, in Nanterre. The new dance school building was designed by Christian de Portzamparc. Since 1995, the Paris Opera Ballet School has been a boarding school. Nowadays, from 8 a.m. until noon, all pupils attend school classes leading to the obtention of the French baccalauréat (the bac), the general qualification for university entrance in France.

Among the dancers of the Paris Opera Ballet, 95 percent have attended the Paris Opera Ballet School. To describe it differently, for a young dancer to be accepted in the Paris Opera corps de ballet, it is virtually obligatory to enter the Paris Opera Ballet School and attend at least the final two classes (deuxième et première division). More than 90 percent of the candidates do not pass the entrance examination. Even some of the dancers who have later become premiers danseurs (first soloists) or danseurs étoiles (principal dancers) of the Paris Opera Ballet passed the entrance examination only on the second attempt, or were accepted only as fee-paying pupils.

== Choreographers ==
Choreographers associated with the Paris Opera Ballet and works created for the Paris Opera Ballet are:

- Jean Dauberval: La Fille mal gardée (1789).
- Pierre Gardel: Télémaque (1790), Psyché (1793), Le Jugement de Pâris (1793), La Dansomanie (1800)
- Louis Milon: Les Noces de Gamache (1801, in collaboration with Gardel)
- Philippe Taglioni: La Sylphide (1832)
- Jules Perrot: Giselle (1842)
- Jean Coralli: Giselle (1842)
- George Balanchine: Le Palais de cristal (Symphony in C) (1947)
- Carlo Blasis
- Arthur Saint-Léon: Coppélia (1870)
- Louis Meranté: Sylvia (1876)
- Serge Lifar: Les Créatures de Prométhée (1929), Icare (1935), Istar (1941), Suite en blanc (1943)
- Kenneth MacMillan: Métaboles (1978), Les Quatre Saisons (1978)
- Rudolf Nureyev: Raymonda (1983), Swan Lake (Le Lac des cygnes) (1984), Romeo and Juliet (1984), The Nutcracker (1985), La Bayadère (1992)
- Maurice Béjart: Arepo (1986)
- William Forsythe: In the Middle, Somewhat Elevated (1987), Woundwork I, Pas./Parts (1999), Blake Works I (2016)
- Angelin Preljocaj: Le Parc (1994), Annonciation (1996), MC/14-22 (Ceci est mon corps) (2004), Le Songe de Médée (2004)
- Roland Petit: Notre-Dame-de-Paris (1965), Clavigo (1999)
- Pina Bausch: Le Sacre du printemps (1997), Orpheus et Eurydice (2005)
- Wayne McGregor: Genus (2007), L'Anatomie de la sensation (2011)
- Sasha Waltz: Romeo and Juliet (2007)
- Saburo Teshigawara: Air (2003), Darkness is Hiding Black Horses (2013)
- John Neumeier: La Dame aux Camélias (2006), Song of the Earth (2015)

== Dancers ==
There are five ranks of dancers in the Paris Opera Ballet; from highest to lowest they are: Danseur Étoile, premier danseur, sujet, coryphée, and quadrille. Promotions to the higher rank depend on success in the annual competitive examinations, except for danseurs étoiles who are nominated by the Director of the Opera, on a proposal from the Director of the Ballet.

=== Étoiles ===
Name	Nationality	Training	Joined POB	Promoted to Étoile	Other companies (incl. guest performances)
Amandine Albisson	France	Art et Danse studio Paris Opera Ballet School	2006	2014	Hamburg Ballet
Bleuen Battistoni	France	Ecole Guillemette Meyrieux Conservatoire de Paris; Paris Opera Ballet School	2017	2024	
Léonore Baulac	France	Conservatoire de Paris Paris Opera Ballet School	2008	2017	
Valentine Colasante	France	Paris Opera Ballet School	2006	2018	
Guillaume Diop	France	Paris Opera Ballet School	2018	2023	
Dorothée Gilbert	France	Toulouse National Conservatoire Paris Opera Ballet School	2000	2007	Stuttgart Ballet
Mathias Heymann	France	Academie Danse Attitude Paris Opera Ballet School	2004	2009	American Ballet Theatre
Germain Louvet	France	Paris Opera Ballet School	2011	2014	
Hugo Marchand	France	Nantes Conservatory Paris Opera Ballet School	2011	2017	Hong Kong Ballet La Scala Theatre Ballet
Paul Marque	France	Paris Opera Ballet School	2014	2020	
Marc Moreau	France	Paris Opera Ballet School	2004	2023	
Hannah O'Neill	France	New Zealand; Japan	Kishibe Ballet Studio Mt Eden Ballet Academy Australian Ballet School	2013	2023
Sae Eun Park	South Korea	Korea's National Academy of Ballet Korea National University of Arts; ABT Studio Company	2011	2021	Korea National Ballet
Roxane Stojanov	France; North Macedonia	Paris Opera Ballet School	2013	2024	

The maximum number of active danseurs étoiles within the company, originally limited to four, has progressively increased over time and is nowadays set at sixteen. The title is conferred for life and is therefore kept after retirement, which is set at a maximum age of 42, as for all other dancers of the Paris Opera Ballet.

=== Notable former dancers ===
Former dancers, by year of company entrance:
- 1726-1751: Marie Camargo
- 1727-1741: Marie Sallé
- 1749-1782: Gaétan Vestris
- 1772-1816: Auguste Vestris
- 1826-1837: Pauline Leroux
- 1832-1837: Marie Taglioni
- 1839-1868: Lucien Petipa
- 1858-1862: Emma Livry
- 1870: Giuseppina Bozzacchi
- 1894-1930: Carlotta Zambelli
- ?-1923: Antonine Meunier
- 1951: Frances Davis
- 1942-1951: Jacqueline Moreau
- 1947-?: Michel Descombey
- 1990-2017 Emmanuel Thibault

Former étoiles, by year of nomination:

- 1940-1960: Lycette Darsonval
- 1941-1945: Yvette Chauviré
- 1946-1959: Michel Renault
- 1953-1953: Jean Babilée
- 1956-1975: Claude Bessy
- 1957-1961: Marjorie Tallchief
- 1961-1964: Flemming Flindt
- 1961-1972: Attilio Labis
- 1964-1986: Cyril Atanassoff
- 1969-1983: Wilfride Piollet
- 1972-1985: Ghislaine Thesmar
- 1972-1990: Jean Guizerix
- 1976-1980: Dominique Khalfouni
- 1980-1997: Patrick Dupond
- 1981-1999: Élisabeth Platel
- 1982-1994: Monique Loudières
- 1984-1989: Sylvie Guillem
- 1985-2001: Isabelle Guérin
- 1985-2007: Laurent Hilaire
- 1986-2009: Manuel Legris
- 1989-2008: Kader Belarbi
- 1990-1998: Marie-Claude Pietragalla
- 1993-2014: Nicolas Le Riche
- 1997-2011: José Martinez
- 1997-2013: Agnès Letestu
- 1998-2015: Aurélie Dupont
- 2002-2017: Laetitia Pujol
- 2002-2012: Clairemarie Osta
- 2004-2018: Marie-Agnès Gillot
- 2004-2025: Mathieu Ganio
- 2009-2018: Karl Paquette
- 2009-2014: Isabelle Ciaravola
- 2012-2018: Josua Hoffalt
- 2012-2024: Myriam Ould-Braham
- 2012-2025: Ludmila Pagliero
- 2013-2021: Eleonora Abbagnato
- 2013-2022: Alice Renavand

== See also ==
- History of ballet
- List of productions of Swan Lake derived from its 1895 revival
- Rudolf Nureyev
