= Mats Ek =

Swedish choreographer and stage director (born 1945)

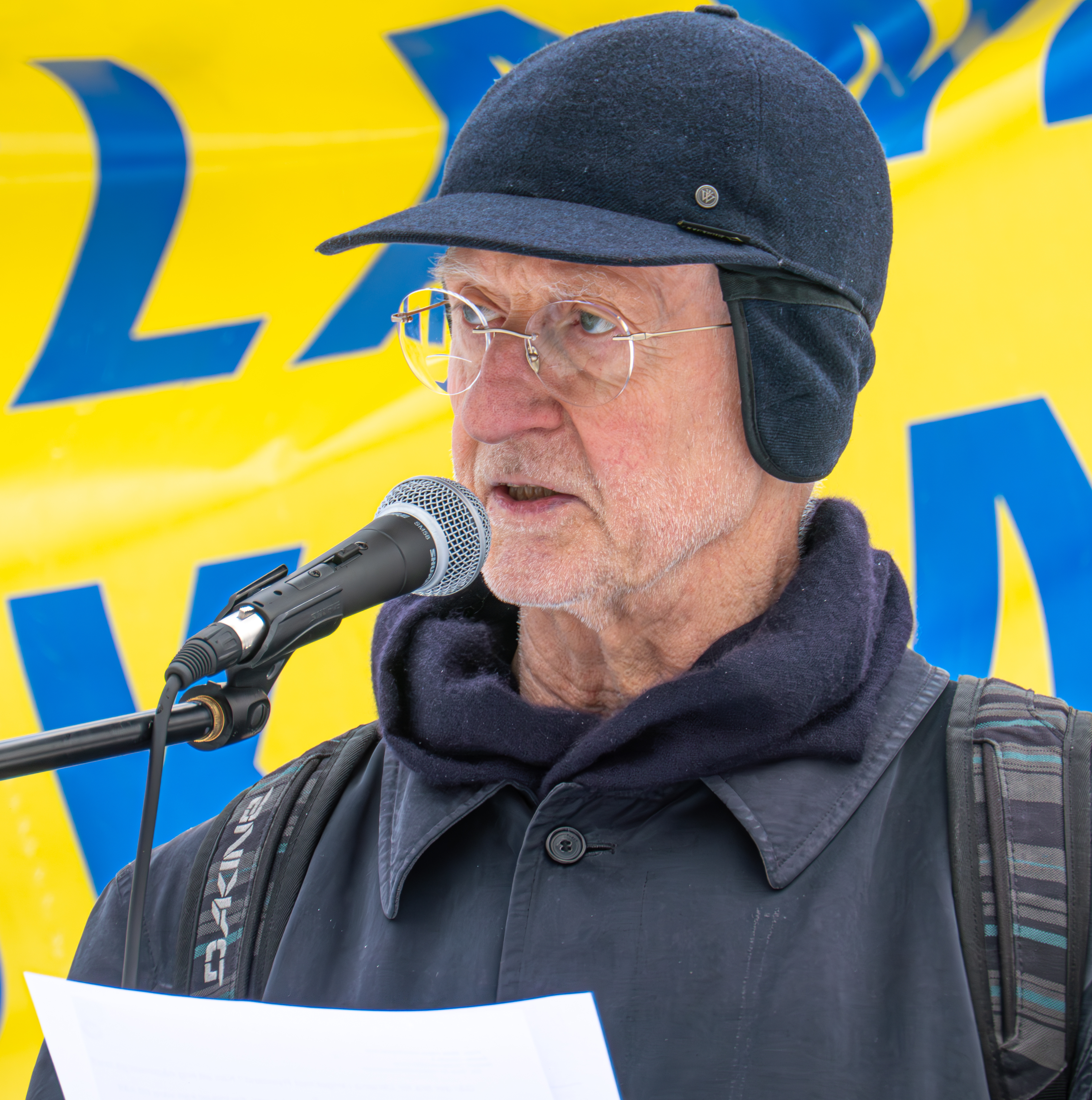
Mats Ek in 2024

Mats Ek (born 18 April 1945) is a Swedish dance and ballet choreographer, dancer and stage director. He was the manager of the Cullberg Ballet from 1985 to 1993.

== Life and career ==
Ek was born in Malmö in 1945, the son of the Royal Dramatic Theatre actor Anders Ek and choreographer Birgit Cullberg.

At 17, he followed a summer dance course (modern) taught by Donya Feuer. He pursued theatrical studies at the Marieborg Folks College in Sweden. From 1966 until 1973, he acted as the director for the Marionett Theater as well as the Royal Dramatic Theatre in Stockholm.

In 1972, Ek joined the Cullberg Ballet. In 1975, he formed part of the corps de ballet for the Ballett der Deutschen Oper am Rhein in Düsseldorf. And in 1976, he made his first choreography titled The Officer's Servant for the Cullberg Ballet. In 1978, Ek became, together with Birgit Cullberg, artistic director of the Cullberg Ballet, until 1985 when the responsibility became his entirely. This position he fulfilled until 1993. During the season 1980-1981, he was associated with the Nederlands Dans Theater as dancer as well as choreographer.

In some of Ek's former choreographies, traditions of Kurt Jooss and of his mother, Birgit Cullberg may be apparent. He uses classical as well as modern dance techniques. Social engagement of psychological dilemmas combined with subtle humor, form the basis of his choreographies. For Ek, movement is a means of individual expression. Aesthetic value is not his first priority.

Ek studied dance and theatre and directed theatre at the Marionette Theatre, the Stockholm City Theatre and the Royal Dramatic Theatre. In 1973 Mats Ek joined the Cullberg Ballet as a dancer. Three years later he began choreographing for the company. Saint George and the Dragon, Soweto and The House of Bernarda belong to his earliest ballets. From 1981 until 1993 Mats Ek was the artistic director of the Cullberg Ballet, succeeding his mother Birgit Cullberg. Mats Ek's extensive production of ballets includes more than twenty works for the Cullberg Ballet, among them sensational reworks of classics like 'Giselle' (1982), 'Swan Lake' (1987) and 'Carmen' (1992). After leaving the Cullberg Ballet, Mats Ek became guest choreographer with major international dance companies. He created Sleeping Beauty for the Hamburg Ballet (1996), A Sort Of for the Nederlands Dans Theater (1997), and Apartment for the Paris Opera (2000). Several of Mats Ek's ballets have been adapted for television, two of them received Emmy awards.

Mats Ek notable choreographic theater works include Don Giovanni (1999) and Andromaque (2001) at the Royal Dramatic Theatre. With his latest choreography FLUKE, premiered in November 2002 at Dansens Hus in Stockholm, Mats Ek has once again created a work for the Cullberg Ballet, this time in cooperation with the Pork Quartet.

In 2006, he won the Prix Benois de la Danse.

== Europe Theatre Prize ==
In 2016, he was awarded the XV Europe Theatre Prize, in Craiova, for his "contribution to the revolution in contemporary dance".

== Works ==
- Kalfaktorn (1976)
- St. George and the Dragon (1976)
- The Officer's Servant (1976)
- Soweto (1977)
- The House of Bernarda (1978)
- Giselle (1982)
- Le Sacre du printemps (1984)
- Parken (1987)
- Gräs (1987)
- Schwanensee (Swan Lake) (1987)
- Gamla barn (1989)
- Carmen (1992)
- Meinungslose Weiden (1992)
- She was Black (1995)
- Rök (Smoke) (1995)
- Sleeping Beauty (1996)
- Une sorte de... (1997)
- En slags (1997)
- På Norbotten (1999)
- Don Giovanni (1999)
- Down North (1999)
- Apartment (2000)
- Andromaque (2001)
- FLUKE (2002)
- Pas de Danse (2005)
- Pic Nic (2007)
- Fireplace (2008)
- Ajö (2010)
- Bye (2012)
- Juliet and Romeo (2013)
- Utvandrarna
- AXE (2015)
- Romanian Memory (2016), special creation for the Europe Theatre Prize

== Bibliography ==
- Ada d'Adamo, Mats Ek. Palermo, L'Epos, 2002 ISBN 88-8302-175-4
