= List of prima ballerinas =

This is a list of people who have been awarded the title prima ballerina, technically the second highest title that can be awarded to a ballerina: prima ballerina assoluta being the first. It is also used as a description of the place of a particular dancer within a company.

"Prima ballerina literally translates to “first principal dancer” from Italian and, in the United States, is better known as someone who is a female principal dancer. These dancers are the best in their companies who perform the lead roles in ballets, along with their male counterparts".

== List of prima ballerinas ==
Rita Cutrim
Cutrim
Rita
1977

Brazil

Stella Abrera
Abrera
Stella
1978

Philippines/United States
No

Rita Cutrim
Cutrim
Rita
1977
Brazil
No

Diana Adams
Adams
Diana
1926
1993
United States
No

Amandine Albisson
Albisson
Amandine
1989

France
Yes

Maria Alexandrova
Alexandrova
Maria
1978

Russia
Yes

Heléne Alexopoulos
Alexopoulos
Heléne

United States
No

Kirsten Bloom Allen
Allen
Kirsten

United States
Yes

Alicia Amatriain
Amatriain
Alicia

Spain
Yes

Josette Amiel
Amiel
Josette
1930

France
No

Nina Ananiashvili
Ananiashvili
Nina
1963

Georgia
No

Dores André
André
Dores

Spain
Yes

Elena Andreianova
Andreianova
Elena
1819
1857
Russia
No

Loipa Araújo
Araújo
Loipa
1941

Cuba
No

Carole Arbo
Arbo
Carole
1961

France
No

Sadaise Arencibia
Arencibia
Sadaise
c. 1981

Cuba
Yes

Sonia Arova
Arova
Sonia
1927
2001
Bulgaria
No

Merrill Ashley
Ashley
Merrill
1950

United States
No

Altynai Asylmuratova
Asylmuratova
Altynai
1961

Russia
No

Silvia Azzoni
Azzoni
Silvia
1973

Italy
Yes

Elisa Badenes
Badenes
Elisa

Spain
Yes

Bai Shuxiang
Bai
Shuxiang
1939

China
No

Caroline Baldwin
Baldwin
Caroline
1990

United States
Yes

Melania Ballish Regueiro
Ballish Regueiro
Melania
1975

Brazil
No

Irina Baronova
Baronova
Irina
1919
2008
Russia
No

Maniya Barredo
Barredo
Maniya
1951

Philippines
No

Léonore Baulac
Baulac
Léonore
1990

France
Yes

Pati Behrs
Behrs
Pati
1922
2004
Russia
No

Christiana Bennett
Bennett
Christiana

United States
No

Leanne Benjamin
Benjamin
Leanne
1964

Australia
No

Svetlana Beriosova
Beriosova
Svetlana
1932
1998
Lithuania
No

Claude Bessy
Bessy
Claude
1932

France
No

Natalia Bessmertnova
Bessmertnova
Natalia
1941
2008
Russia
No

Rebecca Bianchi
Bianchi
Rebecca
1990

Italy
Yes

Alicja Boniuszko
Boniuszko
Alicja
1937
2019
Poland
No

Aurora Bosch
Bosch
Aurora
1942

Cuba
No

Hélène Bouchet
Bouchet
Hélène
1980

France
Yes

Ashley Bouder
Bouder
Ashley
1983

United States
Yes

Isabella Boylston
Boylston
Isabella
1986

United States
Yes

Skylar Brandt
Brandt
Skylar
1993

United States
Yes

Amparo Brito
Brito
Amparo

Cuba
No

Deborah Bull
Bull
Deborah
1963

United Kingdom
No

Norodom Buppha Devi
Buppha Devi
Norodom
1943
2019
Cambodia
No

Darcey Bussell
Bussell
Darcey
1969

United Kingdom
No

Maria Calegari
Calegari
Maria
1957

United States
No

Elisa Carrillo Cabrera
Carrillo Cabrera
Elisa
1981

Mexico
Yes

Carolyn Carlson
Carlson
Carolyn

France
No

Fanny Cerrito
Cerrito
Fanny
1817
1909
Italy
No

Ludmilla Chiriaeff
Chiriaeff
Ludmilla
1924
1996
Canada
No

Yvonne Chouteau
Chouteau
Yvonne
1929
2016
United States
No

Frances Chung
Chung
Frances

Canada
Yes

Isabelle Ciaravola
Ciaravola
Isabelle
1972

France
No

Lia Cirio
Cirio
Lia

United States
Yes

Evelyn Cisneros-Legate
Cisneros-Legate
Evelyn
1958

United States
No

Simone Clarke
Clarke
Simone
1970

United Kingdom
No

Florence Clerc
Clerc
Florence
1951

France
No

Alina Cojocaru
Cojocaru
Alina
1981

Romania
Yes

Valentine Colasante
Colasante
Valentine
1989

France
Yes

Janet Collins
Collins
Janet
1917
2003
United States
No

Petra Conti
Conti
Petra
1988

Italy
Yes

Misty Copeland
Copeland
Misty
1982

United States
Yes

Bernice Coppieters
Coppieters
Bernice
1970

Belgium
No

Émilie Cozette
Cozette
Émilie
1981

France
No

J'aime Crandall
Crandall
J'aime
1982

United States
Yes

Nuno Cunha
Cunha
Nuno
1971

Portugal
Yes

Lauren Cuthbertson
Cuthbertson
Lauren
1984

United Kingdom
Yes

Alexandra Danilova
Danilova
Alexandra
1903
1997
Russia
No

Lycette Darsonval
Darsonval
Lycette
1912
1996
France
No

Liane Daydé
Daydé
Liane
1932
2022
France
No

Igone de Jongh
de Jongh
Igone
1979

Netherlands
No

Ninette de Valois
de Valois
Ninette
1898
2001
Ireland
No

Sasha De Sola
De Sola
Sasha

United States
Yes

Holly Dorger
Dorger
Holly

United States
Yes

Jurgita Dronina
Dronina
Jurgita
1986

Russia/Lithuania
Yes

Natalia Dudinskaya
Dudinskaya
Natalia
1912
2003
Ukraine
No

Aurélie Dupont
Dupont
Aurélie
1973

France
No

Viviana Durante
Durante
Viviana
1967

Italy
No

Irina Dvorovenko
Dvorovenko
Irina
1973

Ukraine
No

Madeleine Eastoe
Eastoe
Madeleine

Australia
No

Marina Eglevsky
Eglevsky
Marina

United States
No

Lubov Egorova
Egorova
Lubov
1880
1972
Russia
No

Ashley Ellis
Ellis
Ashley

United States
No

Fanny Elssler
Elssler
Fanny
1810
1884
Austria
No

Megan Fairchild
Fairchild
Megan
1984

United States
Yes

Suzanne Farrell
Farrell
Suzanne
1945

United States
No

Lorena Feijóo
Feijóo
Lorena

Cuba
No

Lorna Feijóo
Feijóo
Lorena

Cuba
No

Nikisha Fogo
Fogo
Nikisha
1995

Sweden
Yes

Norma Fontenla
Fontenla
Norma
1930
1971
Argentina
No

Margot Fonteyn
Fonteyn
Margot
1919
1991
United Kingdom
No

Carla Fracci
Fracci
Carla
1936
2021
Italy
No

Mathilde Froustey
Froustey
Mathilde
1985

France
Yes

Fanny Gaida
Gaida
Fanny
1961

France
No

Mara Galeazzi
Galeazzi
Mara
1973

Italy
No

Rosina Galli
Galli
Rosina
1892
1940
Italy
No

Marta García
García
Marta
1949
2017
Cuba
No

Yekaterina Geltzer
Geltzer
Yekaterina
1876
1962
Russia
No

Emilie Gerrity
Gerrity
Emilie

United States
Yes

Dorothée Gilbert
Gilbert
Dorothée
1983

France
Yes

Marie-Agnès Gillot
Gillot
Marie-Agnès
1975

France
No

Céline Gittens
Gittens
Céline

Trinidad and Tobago
Yes

Beryl Goldwyn
Goldwyn
Beryl
1930

United Kingdom
No

Ofelia González
González
Ofelia

Cuba
No

Kathleen Gorham
Gorham
Kathleen
1928
1983
Australia
No

Diana Gould
Gould
Diana
1912
2003
United Kingdom
No

Nadezhda Gracheva
Gracheva
Nadezhda
1969

Kazakhstan
No

Lucile Grahn
Grahn
Lucile
1819
1907
Denmark
No

Cynthia Gregory
Gregory
Cynthia
1946

United States
No

Beryl Grey
Grey
Beryl
1927

United Kingdom
No

Carlotta Grisi
Grisi
Carlotta
1819
1899
Italy
No

Isabelle Guérin
Guérin
Isabelle
1961

France
No

Sylvie Guillem
Guillem
Sylvie
1965

France
No

Evelyn Hart
Hart
Evelyn
1956

Canada
No

Marcia Haydée
Haydée
Marcia
1937

Brazil
No

Francesca Hayward
Hayward
Francesca
1992

United Kingdom
Yes

Laura Hecquet
Hecquet
Laura
1984

France
Yes

Robyn Hendricks
Hendricks
Robyn

South Africa
Yes

Paloma Herrera
Herrera
Paloma
1975

Argentina
No

Rosella Hightower
Hightower
Rosella
1920
2008
United States
No

Greta Hodgkinson
Hodgkinson
Greta
1973

United States
Yes

Catherine Hurlin
Hurlin
Catherine
1996

United States
Yes

Carrie Imler
Imler
Carrie
1977/1978

United States
No

Avdotia Istomina
Istomina
Avdotia
1799
1848
Russia
No

Rowena Jackson
Jackson
Rowena
1926
2024
New Zealand
No

Xue Jinghua
Jinghua
Xue
1945

China
No

Anna Johansson
Johansson
Anna
1860
1917
Russia
No

Lana Jones
Jones
Lana

Australia
No

Karen Kain
Kain
Karen
1951

Canada
No

Yuriko Kajiya
Kajiya
Yuriko
1984

Japan
Yes

Fumi Kaneko
Kaneko
Fumi
1991

Japan
Yes

Nina Kaptsova
Kaptsova
Nina
1978

Russia
Yes

Kang Sue-jin
Kang
Sue-jin
1967

South Korea
No

Bernara Karieva
Karieva
Bernara
1936

Uzbekistan
No

Tamara Karsavina
Karsavina
Tamara
1885
1978
Russia
No

Allegra Kent
Kent
Allegra
1937

United States
No

Julie Kent
Kent
Julie
1969

United States
No

Dominique Khalfouni
Khalfouni
Dominique
1951

France
No

Ji-Young Kim
Kim
Ji-Young
1978

South Korea
Yes

Gelsey Kirkland
Kirkland
Gelsey
1952

United States
No

Daria Klimentová
Klimentová
Daria
1971

Czechoslovakia
No

Maria Kochetkova
Kochetkova
Maria
1984

Russia
Yes

Elizaveta Kokoreva
Kokoreva
Elizaveta

Russia
Yes

Carla Körbes
Körbes
Carla
1981

Brazil
No

Irina Kolpakova
Kolpakova
Irina
1933

Russia
No

Ako Kondo
Kondo
Ako
1991

Japan
Yes

Alyona Kovalyova
Kovalyova
Alyona

Russia
Yes

Maria Kowroski
Kowroski
Maria
1976

United States
Yes

Rebecca Krohn
Krohn
Rebecca

United States
No

Ekaterina Krysanova
Krysanova
Ekaterina
1985

Russia
Yes

Kateryna Kukhar
Kukhar
Kateryna
1982

Ukraine
Yes

Misa Kuranaga
Kuranaga
Misa
1982

Japan
Yes

Ninel Kurgapkina
Kurgapkina
Ninel
1929
2009
Russia
No

Lucía Lacarra
Lacarra
Lucía
1975

Spain
Yes

Madeleine Lafon
Lafon
Madeleine
1924
1967
France
No

Isabella LaFreniere
LaFreniere
Isabella

United States
Yes

Doris Laine
Laine
Doris
1931
2018
Finland
No

Sarah Lamb
Lamb
Sarah
1980

United States
Yes

Margot Lander
Lander
Margot
1910
1961
Denmark
No

Maryon Lane
Lane
Maryon
1931
2008
South Africa
No

Sarah Lane
Lane
Sarah
1984

United States
Yes

Moscelyne Larkin
Larkin
Moscelyne
1925
2012
United States
No

Tina LeBlanc
LeBlanc
Tina
1966

United States
No

Tanaquil LeClercq
LeClercq
Tanaquil
1929
2000
France
No

Sara Leland
Leland
Sara
1941
2020
United States
No

Olga Lepeshinskaya
Lepeshinskaya
Olga
1916
2008
Ukraine
No

Agnes Letestu
Letestu
Agnes
1971

France
No

Larissa Lezhnina
Lezhnina
Larissa
1969

Russia
Yes

Emma Livry
Livry
Emma
1842
1863
France
No

Maria Elena Llorente
Llorente
Maria Elena

Cuba
No

Elena Lobsanova
Lobsanova
Elena

Russia. Canada
Yes

Ulyana Lopatkina
Lopatkina
Ulyana
1973

Ukraine
No

Lourdes Lopez
Lopez
Lourdes
1958

Cuba/United States
No

Lydia Lopokova
Lopokova
Lydia
1892
1981
Russia
No

Monique Loudières
Loudières
Monique
1956

France
No

Lauren Lovette
Lovette
Lauren
1993

United States
Yes

Svetlana Lunkina
Lunkina
Svetlana
1979

Russia
Yes

Jean Mackenzie
Mackenzie
Jean

1986
Canada
No

Lisa Macuja-Elizalde
Macuja-Elizalde
Lisa
1964

Philippines
Yes

Natalia Magnicaballi
Magnicaballi
Natalia

Argentina
Yes

Mayara Magri
Magri
Mayara
1994

Brazil
Yes

Natalia Makarova
Makarova
Natalia
1940

Russia
No

Maia Makhateli
Makhateli
Maia
1986

Georgia
Yes

Tatiana Mamaki
Mamaki
Tatiana
1921
2007
Greece
No

Nicoletta Manni
Manni
Nicoletta
1991

Italy
Yes

Andrée Marlière
Marlière
Andrée
1934
2008
Belgium
No

Roberta Marquez
Marquez
Roberta
1977

Brazil
No

Nikola Márová
Márová
Nikola
1980

Czechoslovakia
Yes

Monica Mason
Mason
Monica
1941

South Africa
No

Sophie Martin
Martin
Sophie
1984

France
Yes

Kizzy Matiakis
Matiakis
Kizzy
1981

United Kingdom
Yes

Elisabeth Maurin
Maurin
Elisabeth
1963

France
No

Ekaterina Maximova
Maximova
Ekaterina
1939
2009
Russia
No

Kay Mazzo
Mazzo
Kay
1946

United States
No

Patricia McBride
McBride
Patricia
1942

United States
No

Sara Mearns
Mearns
Sara
1986

United States
Yes

Josefina Méndez
Méndez
Josefina
1941
2007
Cuba
No

Magali Messac
Messac
Magali
1952

France
No

Varvara P. Mey
Mey
Varvara P.
1912
1995
Russia
No

Galina Mezentseva
Mezentseva
Galina
1952

Russia
No

Laura Morera
Morera
Laura

Spain
Yes

Claire Motte
Motte
Claire
1937
1986
France
No

Yvonne Mounsey
Mounsey
Yvonne
1919
2012
South Africa
No

Gillian Murphy
Murphy
Gillian
1979

United States
Yes

Mira Nadon
Nadon
Mira
2001/2002

United States
Yes

Yasmine Naghdi
Naghdi
Yasmine
1992

United Kingdom
Yes

Nadia Nerina
Nerina
Nadia
1927
2008
South Africa
No

Kyra Nichols
Nichols
Kyra
1958

United States
No

Bronislava Nijinska
Nijinska
Bronislava
1891
1972
Poland
No

Anna Nikulina
Nikulina
Anna
1985

Russia
Yes

Irma Nioradze
Nioradze
Irma
1969

Georgia
Yes

Nathalie Nordquist
Nordquist
Nathalie
1979

Sweden
Yes

Nina Novak
Nowak
Janina
1927
2022
Poland/Venezuela
No

Marianela Núñez
Núñez
Marianela
1982

Argentina
Yes

Agnes Oaks
Oaks
Agnes
1970

Estonia
No

Maria Oberlander
Oberlander
Maria
1917
2018
Hungary
No

Evgenia Obraztsova
Obraztsova
Evgenia
1984

Russia
Yes

Fernanda Oliveira
Oliveira
Fernanda
1980

Brazil
Yes

Hannah O'Neill
O'Neill
Hannah
1993

New Zealand
Yes

Alla Osipenko
Osipenko
Alla
1932

Russia
No

Natalia Osipova
Osipova
Natalia
1986

Russia
Yes

Clairemarie Osta
Osta
Clairemarie
1970

France
No

Anna Rose O'Sullivan
O'Sullivan
Anna Rose
1994

United Kingdom
Yes

Myriam Ould-Braham
Ould-Braham
Myriam
1982

France
Yes

Ethéry Pagava
Pagava
Ethéry
1932

France
No

Annette Page
Page
Annette
1932
2017
United Kingdom
No

Ludmila Pagliero
Pagliero
Ludmila
1983

Argentina
Yes

Noelani Pantastico
Panstastico
Noelani
1980

United States
Yes

Merle Park
Park
Merle
1937

Zimbabwe
No

Sae Eun Park
Park
Sae Eun
1989

South Korea
Yes

Wona Park
Park
Wona

South Korea
Yes

Georgina Parkinson
Parkinson
Georgina
1938
2009
United Kingdom
No

Veronika Part
Part
Veronika
1978

Russia
No

Annette av Paul
av Paul
Annette
1944

Sweden/Canada
No

Anna Pavlova
Pavlova
Anna
1881
1931
Russia
No

Nadezhda Pavlova
Pavlova
Nadezhda
1956

Russia
No

Ana Pavlovic
Pavlovic
Ana
1973

Serbia
Yes

Tiler Peck
Peck
Tiler
1989

United States
Yes

Unity Phelan
Phelan
Unity
1995

United States
Yes

Marie-Claude Pietragalla
Pietragalla
Marie-Claude
1963

France
No

Mirta Plá
Plá
Mirta
1940
2003
Cuba
No

Noëlla Pontois
Pontois
Noëlla
1943

France
No

Ida Praetorius
Praetorius
Ida
1993

Denmark
Yes

Élisabeth Platel
Platel
Élisabeth
1959

France
No

Olga Preobrajenska
Preobrajenska
Olga
1871
1962
Russia
No

Ellen Price
Price
Ellen
1878
1968
Denmark
No

Laetitia Pujol
Pujol
Laetitia
1975

France
No

Roma Pryma-Bohachevsky
Pryma-Bohachevsky
Roma
1927
2004
Ukraine
No

Marie Rambert
Rambert
Marie
1888
1982
Poland
No

Jacqueline Rayet
Rayet
Jacqueline
1933

France
No

Teresa Reichlen
Reichlen
Teresa

United States
Yes

Alice Renavand
Renavand
Alice
1980

France
Yes

Xiomara Reyes
Reyes
Xiomara
1973

Cuba
No

Tatiana Riabouchinska
Riabouchinska
Tatiana
1917
2000
Russia
No

Jenifer Ringer
Ringer
Jenifer

United States
No

Sonia Rodriguez
Rodriguez
Sonia
1972

Canada
No

Tamara Rojo
Rojo
Tamara
1974

Spain
Yes

Carolina Rosati
Rosati
Carolina
1826
1905
Italy
No

Danielle Rowe
Rowe
Danielle
1982

Australia
No

Ida Rubinstein
Rubinstein
Ida
1883
1960
Ukraine
No

Stephanie Saland
Saland
Stephanie

United States
No

Iana Salenko
Salenko
Iana
1983

Ukraine
Yes

Ekaterina Sankovskaya
Sankovskaya
Ekaterina
1816
1878
Russia
No

Luciana Savignano
Savignano
Luciana
1943

Italy
No

Jeanne Schwarz
Schwarz
Jeanne
1887
1970
France
No

Solange Schwarz
Schwarz
Solange
1910
2000
France
No

Amber Scott
Scott
Amber

Australia
Yes

Rina Schenfeld
Schenfeld
Rina
1938

Israel
No

Ludmila Semenyaka
Semenyaka
Ludmila
1952

Russia
No

Polina Semionova
Semionova
Polina
1984

Russia
Yes

Marina Semyonova
Semyonova
Marina
1908
2010
Russia
No

Hee Seo
Seo
Hee
1986

South Korea
Yes

Eleonora Sevenard
Sevenard
Eleonora
1998

Russia
Yes

Lynn Seymour
Seymour
Lynn
1939

Canada
No

Moira Shearer
Shearer
Moira
1926
2006
United Kingdom
No

Christine Shevchenko
Shevchenko
Christine
1988

Ukraine
Yes

Ekaterina Shipulina
Shipulina
Ekaterina
1979

Russia
Yes

Antoinette Sibley
Sibley
Antoinette
1939

United Kingdom
No

Alla Sizova
Sizova
Alla
1939
2014
Russia
No

Mia Slavenska
Slavenska
Mia
1916
2002
Croatia
No

Jennie Somogyi
Somogyi
Jennie

United States
No

Alina Somova
Somova
Alina
1985

Russia
Yes

Olga Spessivtseva
Spessivtseva
Olga
1895
1991
Russia
No

Abi Stafford
Stafford
Abi

United States
Yes

Jennifer Stahl
Stahl
Jennifer

United States
Yes

Anastasia Stashkevich
Stashkevich
Anastasia
1984

Russia
Yes

Tatiana Stepanova
Stepanova
Tatiana
1962

Ukraine
No

Yulia Stepanova
Stepanova
Yulia

Russia
Yes

Rosario Suárez
Suárez
Rosario
1953

Cuba
No

Madoka Sugai
Sugai
Madoka
1994

Japan
Yes

Laurretta Summerscales
Summerscales
Laurretta

United Kingdom
Yes

Mariia Surovshchikova-Petipa
Surovshchikova-Petipa
Mariia
1836
1882
Russia
No

Sofiane Sylve
Sylve
Sofiane
1976

France
Yes

Marie Taglioni
Taglioni
Marie
1804
1884
Sweden
No

Akane Takada
Takada
Akane
1990

Japan
Yes

Erina Takahashi
Takahashi
Erina

Japan
Yes

Maria Tallchief
Tallchief
Maria
1925
2013
United States
No

Marjorie Tallchief
Tallchief
Marjorie
1926
2021
United States
No

Yuan Yuan Tan
Tan
Yuan Yuan
1976

China
Yes

Janie Taylor
Taylor
Janie

United States
Yes

Ludmilla Tchérina
Tchérina
Ludmilla
1924
2004
France
No

Veronica Tennant
Tennant
Veronica
1946

United Kingdom
No

Devon Teuscher
Teuscher
Devon
1989

United States
Yes

Ghislaine Thesmar
Thesmar
Ghislaine
1943

China
No

Nanon Thibon
Thibon
Nanon
1943

France
No

Tamara Toumanova
Toumanova
Tamara
1919
1996
Russia
No

Vera Trefilova
Trefilova
Vera
1875
1943
Russia
No

Cassandra Trenary
Trenary
Cassandra

United States
Yes

Anna Tsygankova
Tsygankova
Anna
1979

Russia
Yes

Viengsay Valdés
Valdés
Viengsay
1976

Cuba
Yes

Ambra Vallo
Vallo
Ambra

Italy
Yes

Sarah Van Patten
Van Patten
Sarah
1984

United States
Yes

Christiane Vaussard
Vaussard
Christiane
1923
2011
France
No

Ekaterina Vazem
Vazem
Ekaterina
1848
1937
Russia
No

Noralma Vera Arrata
Vera Arrata
Noralma
1936

Ecuador
No

Violette Verdy
Verdy
Violette
1933
2016
France
No

Diana Vishneva
Vishneva
Diana
1976

Russia
No

Christine Vlassi
Vlassi
Christine

France
No

Jocelyn Vollmar
Vollmar
Jocelyn
1925
2018
United States
No

Anastasia Volochkova
Volochkova
Anastasia
1976

Russia
Yes

Nina Vyroubova
Vyroubova
Nina
1921
2007
Russia
No

Katita Waldo
Waldo
Katita
1968

Spain
No

Miranda Weese
Weese
Miranda

United States
No

Doreen Wells
Wells
Doreen
1937

United Kingdom
No

Wendy Whelan
Whelan
Wendy
1967

United States
No

Indiana Woodward
Woodward
Indiana
1993 or 1994

France
Yes

Belinda Wright
Wright
Belinda
1929
2007
United Kingdom
No

Zhu Yan
Yan
Zhu

China
Yes

Zenaida Yanowsky
Yanowsky
Zenaida
1975

Spain
No

Miyako Yoshida
Yoshida
Miyako
1965

Japan
No

Vanessa Zahorian
Zahorian
Vanessa

United States
No

Svetlana Zakharova
Zakharova
Svetlana
1979

Ukraine
Yes

Carlotta Zambelli
Zambelli
Carlotta
1875
1968
Italy
No

Wanting Zhao
Zhao
Wanting

China
Yes

== See also ==
- Prima ballerina assoluta
- List of dancers
- List of female dancers
- Women in dance
