= Javier Torres (dancer) =

Ballet dancer

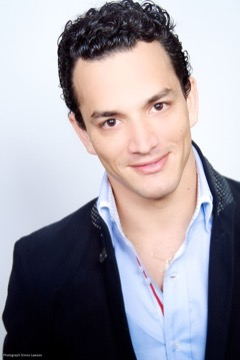
- Born: 14 December 1982 (age 43)
- Education: National Ballet School of Havana-Cuba, The Open University, University of Cumbria
- Career
- Current group: Northern Ballet
- Former groups: Ballet Nacional de Cuba
- Website: www.javiertorres.co.uk

Javier Torres (born, December 14, 1982) is a ballet dancer from Cuba known for dancing for Ballet Nacional de Cuba and Northern Ballet.

== Education ==
Torres holds a BA Hons in Business Management and Leadership Practices from The Open University-UK, (2020). He also holds a Master in Business Administration (MBA) from Cumbria University (2022).

== Career ==
Torres graduated with honours from the National Ballet School of Havana-Cuba as a ballet dancer and ballet teacher in year 2000. The same year, he joined Ballet Nacional de Cuba under the artistic-technical guidance of Alicia Alonso. While dancing for Ballet Nacional de Cuba, Torres was promoted to Principal Dancer in 2004 and Premier Dancer in 2009. He performed in several countries across the Americas, Europe, and Asia. He worked with the ballet coaches Loipa Araujo, Josefina Mendez, Aurora Bosch, and Marta García.

Torres joined Northern Ballet in 2010 as Premier Dancer under the artistic guidance of David Nixon OBE. He has performed in several events with the Company around the UK. He has performed in the International Ballet Festival of Havana, Cuba, and at the Latitude Music Festival in Suffolk.

Torres is a One Dance UK member and a member of the International Dance Council (CID), UNESCO, and a Fellow of the Royal Society of Arts in the UK.

Torres' final performance with Northern Ballet in Kenneth Tindall's Casanova at Sadler's Wells Theatre was hold on Saturday 14 May 2022. He subsequently retired from dancing on the same day.

=== Post retirement career ===
Torres is now the Managing Director of the Acosta Dance Centre & the "Acosta Dance Foundation". He is also the Business Operations Manager (Europe) at Sansha Group.

== Awards and nominations ==
- 2002 - Won the Cuban Artists and Writers Union Villanueva Prize for his performance in the ballet Agon
- 2012 - Received the award Constructores de la Danza for his contribution to the Culture of the state of Ceará in Brazil
- 2018 - Nominated for the Dancing Times Award for Best Male Dancer at the 19th National Dance Awards UK.
- 2019 - Nominated for the One Dance UK Dance personality of the year
- 2019 - Winner of the One Dance UK People’s Choice Awards
- 2020 - Winner of the One Dance UK People’s Choice Awards
- 2020 - Nominated for the One Dance UK Dance films Award
