= Yanowsky =

Yanowsky is a Russian surname. Notable people with the surname include:

- Nadia Yanowsky, Spanish ballet dancer
- Yury Yanowsky (born 1972), Spanish ballet dancer
- Zenaida Yanowsky (born 1975), Spanish ballet dancer
