= Javier Torres =

Javier Torres may refer to:

- Javier Torres Félix, a imprisoned Mexican drug lord
- Javier Torres (dancer), a ballet dancer from Cuba
- Javier Torres Maldonado, a Mexican composer
- Javier Torres Ramis, a swimmer from Spain

== See also ==
- Xavier Torres (disambiguation)
