= Aku Ahjolinna =

Finnish ballet dancer and choreographer

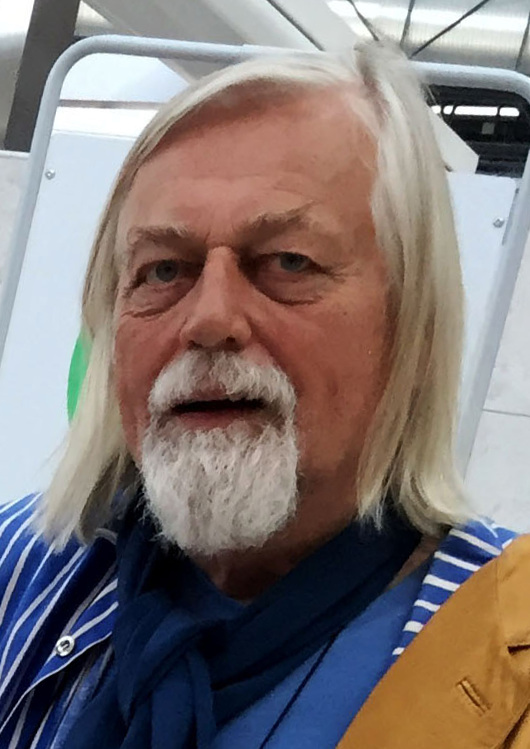
- Ahjolinna, 2019
- Born: Aku Antero Ahjolinna; 8 August 1946 (age 79); Helsinki, Finland
- Education: Finnish National Opera Ballet School
- Occupations: ballet dancer, choreographer
- Spouse: Saga Eriksson

Aku Antero Ahjolinna (born 8 August 1946, in Helsinki) is a Finnish ballet dancer and choreographer.

== Biography ==
Ahjolinna entered the Finnish National Opera Ballet School in 1959. In 1963, at the age of 17, he became a dancer with the Finnish National Ballet, where by 1969 he achieved the status of a solo dancer. Ahjolinna also studied at the Vaganova Academy of Russian Ballet in Leningrad, England, France, Hungary and the United States, and has embarked on numerous tours in Finland and abroad. As a choreographer, Ahjolinna began in 1984 with Paavo Heininen's opera The Damask Drum. He retired from ballet in 1993.

Ahjolinna's roles have included, for example, Khan Girey in The Fountain of Bakhchisarai, Crassus in Spartacus, Iago in Othello, and the elderly mother María Josefa in a ballet adaptation of Lorca's The House of Bernarda Alba. During the 1974–1975 season, he partnered with prima ballerina Marianna Rumjantseva in Swan Lake. He frequently collaborated with Doris Laine, the Finnish National Ballet's late, influential prima ballerina and artistic director.

Ahjolinna's spouse is ballerina and pedagogue Saga Eriksson. He is Eastern Orthodox in his religious conviction.
