= Alfons Almi =

Finnish opera singer and administrator

Professori Alfons Almi
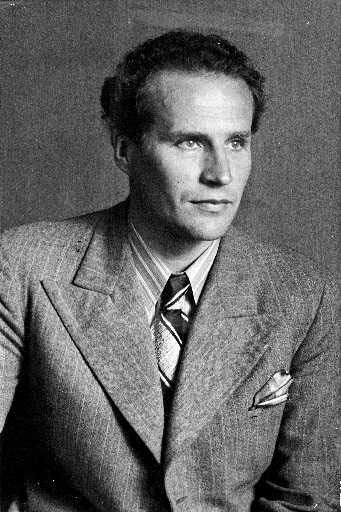
- Almi c. 1950
- Born: Alfons Aleksander Alm; 20 August 1904; Helsinki, Grand Duchy of Finland
- Died: 22 February 1991 (aged 86); Helsinki, Finland
- Occupation: Opera singer
- Known for: Director-General of Finnish National Opera
- Spouses: Aini née Lehtinen (m. 1931–1951) Doris née Laine (m. 1952–1991)

Alfons Almi (né Alm, until 1935; 20 August 1904 — 22 February 1991) was a Finnish opera singer and administrator. He has been described as the 'father of Finnish opera'.

== Career ==
Almi sang the principal tenor at the Opera of Finland (later to become the Finnish National Opera) from 1934 to 1952.

He later moved into management, first as the Finance Manager from 1952, then progressing to general management, and eventually reaching the post of Director General from 1966 to 1971. He also sat on the company's supervisory council and board of directors from 1940 to 1971.

One of his main achievements was the establishment of the National Opera's own in-house orchestra. He also worked tirelessly towards the development of the National Opera's new, purpose-built premises.

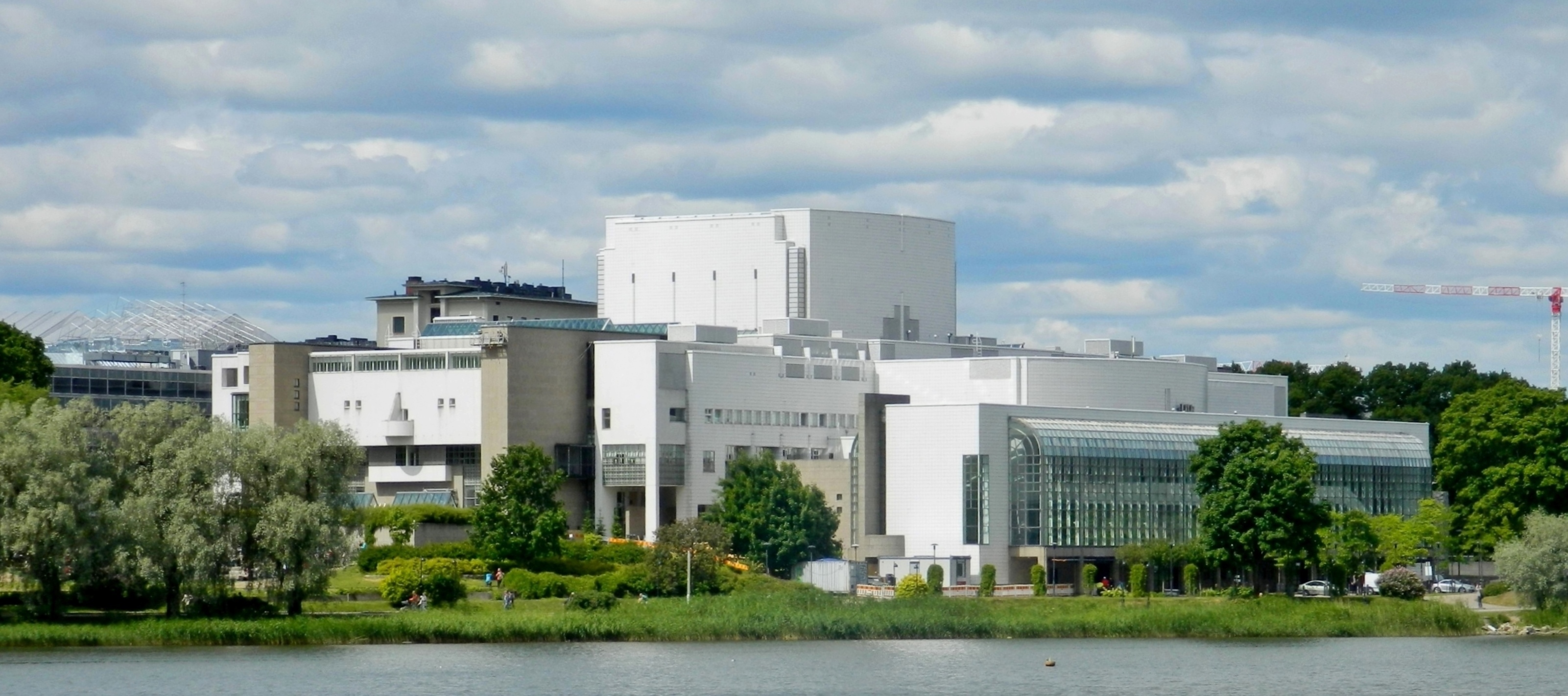
The Finnish National Opera's new home, which Almi was instrumental in developing.

The second stage of the new opera house is named after him.

Outside of the National Opera, Almi served in administrative and leadership positions at numerous cultural and public organisations.

== Awards and honours ==
In 1966, the honorary title of Professori was conferred on Laine by President Urho Kekkonen.

In 1983, Almi was awarded the annual Eskon Puumerkki prize by the Aleksis Kiven Seura.

== Personal life ==
Alfons Alm was born to a working-class family in Helsinki. Both his parents had died by the time he was 10, leaving Almi to look after his siblings.

Almi studied agriculture and dairy production, and initially worked in management roles in the dairy industry, before following his true vocation and retraining as a singer.

Almi served as a junior officer in the Continuation War meritoriously, and was decorated with multiple medals.

He was married twice, first to Aini née Lehtinen from 1931 to 1951, and then to the ballet dancer and Artistic Director of the Finnish National Ballet, Doris Laine, from 1952 until his death. He had one child from each of his marriages. His daughter, Heidi, from his second marriage, works in a management role at the National Opera and Ballet, following in her parents' footsteps.
