= Doris Laine =

Finnish ballet dancer and cultural leader (1931–2018)

Professori Doris Laine Prima ballerina emerita
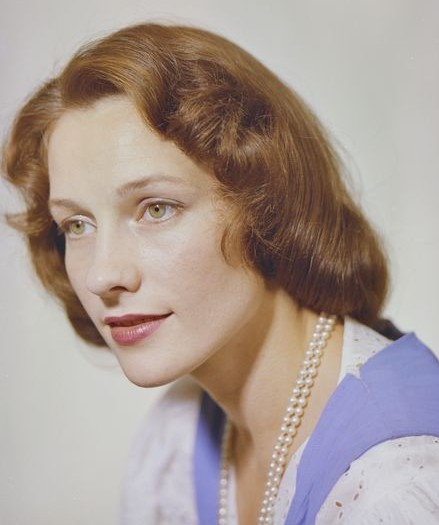
- Doris Laine in the 1950s
- Born: 31 October 1931; Helsinki, Finland
- Died: 15 December 2018 (aged 87); Helsinki, Finland
- Years active: 1947-1997
- Spouse: Alfons Almi
- Children: Heidi Almi (daughter)

Doris Laine (from 1952, Laine-Almi; 31 October 1931 — 15 December 2018) was an internationally recognised Finnish ballet dancer, dance choreographer and pedagog, who later held several prominent leadership positions in dance and the wider performing arts. She is regarded as one of the most influential people in Finnish dance.

== Career ==
=== Dance ===
Laine trained at the ballet school of the Ballet of Finland (later to become the Finnish National Ballet), as well as studying at the Russian Institute of Theatre Arts ('GITIS') and the Moscow State Academy of Choreography. During and after her formal training, she made annual study visits to the USSR, France and the UK.

Laine began her professional career in the Finnish National Ballet's corps de ballet in 1947, before being promoted to soloist in 1952, and to principal in 1956, which position she held for twenty years.

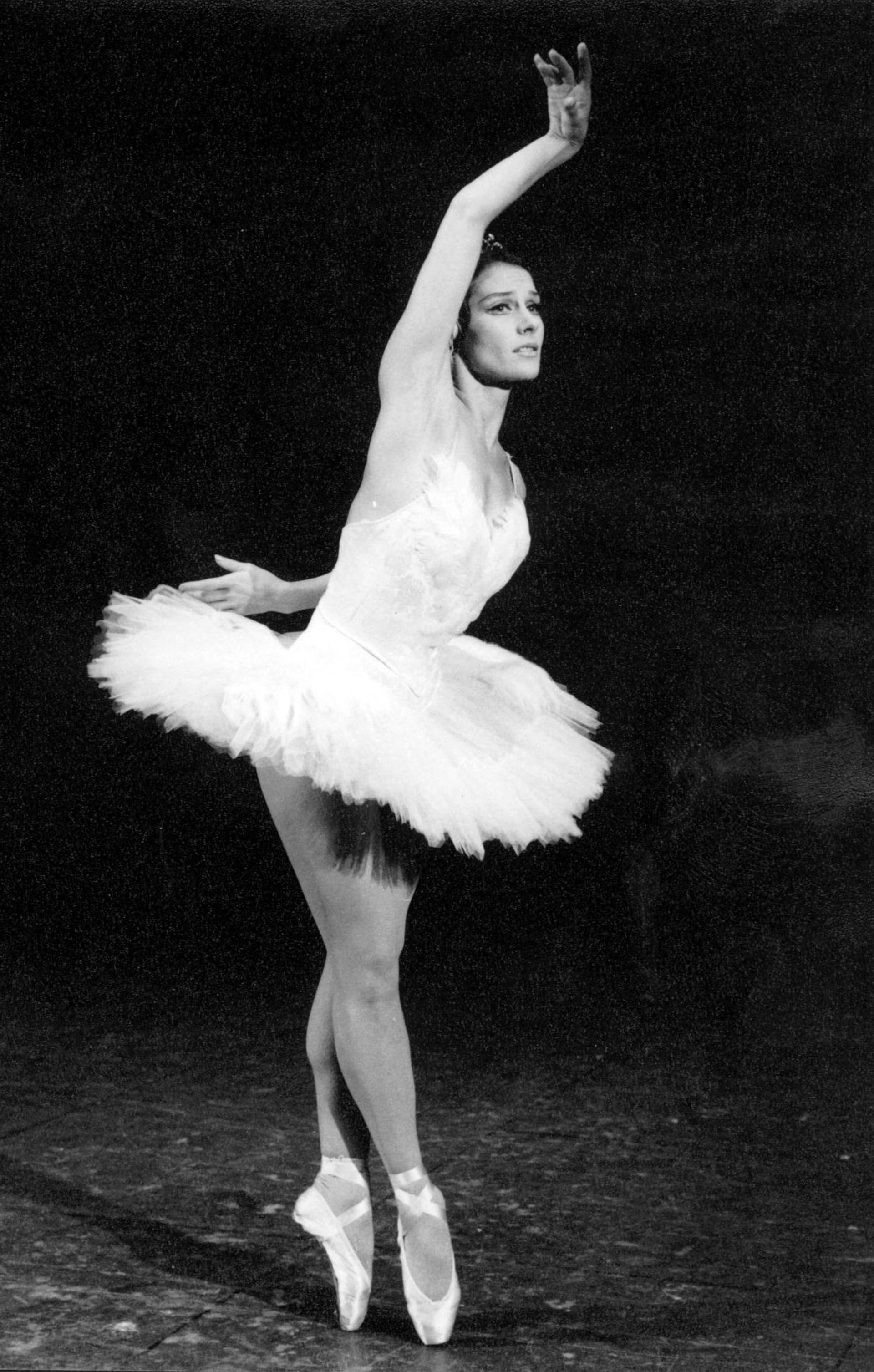
Laine in 1966

From 1964 to 1966, Laine was attached to the Royal Festival Ballet (now English National Ballet) in London as principal dancer.

During her career, Laine danced approximately 50 leading roles, and performed in 29 countries in Europe and the Americas, both in her own right and as part of the National Ballet's tours.

She was especially known for her technical brilliance, virtuosity and sleight of hand.

=== Choreography ===
Over the years, Laine choreographed numerous productions at the Finnish National Ballet.

She was also visiting choreographer at the Norwegian National Opera and Ballet and the National Theatre in Belgrade, among others.

=== Leadership roles ===
In 1985, Laine was appointed the Artistic Director of the Finnish National Ballet, where she served until 1992. During her tenure, she broadened the company's repertoire by premiering several works by Finnish ballet composers. She is also known for having created opportunities for young, upcoming dancers.

She founded the Helsinki International Ballet Competition, first held in 1984, which later became associated with the National Ballet.

She was also the Artistic Director of Kuopio tanssii ja soi, the oldest and largest dance festival in the Nordic region, from 1982 to 1992.

From 1992 to 1995, Laine served as Director of Ballet at the Komische Oper Berlin Tanztheater in Germany.

She judged notable ballet competitions, including Varna, Paris, Moscow and the USA IBC, more than 30 times.

Laine served in board and committee roles at several Finnish artistic, culturo-political and labour market organisations, as well as internationally at the International Dance Council and International Theatre Institute of UNESCO, among others.

== Honours and awards ==
In 1957, Laine was awarded the Pro Finlandia medal of the Order of the Lion of Finland.

In 1985, Laine received a grant from the Finnish Cultural Foundation in recognition of her artistic merits.

In 1992, the honorary title of Professori was conferred on Laine by President Mauno Koivisto.

== Personal life ==
Doris Laine was born to a working-class family in Helsinki. Her parents were Aleksander, a labourer, and Lydia Maria.

She was married to the opera singer and Director-General of the Finnish National Opera, Alfons Almi, from 1952 until his death in 1991; they had one daughter, Heidi (born 1956), who also danced ballet professionally, and now, like her parents before her, works in a management role at the National Opera and Ballet.
