= Lyubov Gershunova =

Russian dancer (1947-2006)

- Любовь Гершунова
- Born: Lyubov Vasilievna Gershunova; 5 August 1947; Novosibirsk, RSFSR, USSR
- Died: 30 October 2006 (aged 59); Novosibirsk, Russia
- Citizenship: Soviet, Russian
- Occupation: Dancer
- Years active: 1967—2006

Lyubov Vasilievna Gershunova (Russian: Любовь Васильевна Гершунова, 5 August 1947 – 30 October 2006) was a Soviet and Russian ballet dancer, prima ballerina of the Novosibirsk Opera and Ballet Theatre, People's Artist of the RSFSR.

== Biography ==
Lyubov Gershunova was born in Novosibirsk. She graduated from the Novosibirsk State Choreographic School.

On 1 July 1967, she was invited to the ballet troupe of the Novosibirsk Opera and Ballet Theater, working there until 31 May 1990. In 1989 she became a soloist of the Balet-Novosibirsk Chamber Theater of Modern and Classical Ballet.

In 1994-1999 she taught the ballet troupe of the Novosibirsk Musical Comedy Theatre.

She toured Australia, New Zealand, France, Canada, Brazil, Japan, Argentina, and others. Maya Plisetskaya often included her in her foreign tours. In 1978 in Buenos Aires, when Plisetskaya was temporarily paralysed due to an inept injection by a local doctor, it was Gershunova who she entrusted with performing her entire repertoire.

From 1999 until her death she worked together with her husband as a teacher at the school of arts at secondary school № 23 in Novosibirsk.

Gershunova died on October 30, 2006 and was buried at the Zayeltsovskoye Cemetery.

== Personal life ==
Her life, personal and professional, was closely connected with Anatoly Berdyshev, an artist and ballet master. Their friendship began at school and grew into a lifelong love affair as they grew older. He was not only her constant stage partner, but also her husband since 1967. Movie "The Story of One Duet" (1984) is dedicated to the couple's creativity.

They're buried next to each other. In 2018, an updated memorial to People's Artists of the RSFSR Anatoly Berdyshev and Lyubov Gershunova was opened.

The couple's son, Anatoly Berdyshev Jr, also devoted his life to ballet.

== Repertoire ==
Her first leading role was Suimbike in F. Yarullin's ballet Shurale in 1968. In 1972 she played Julliete in Romeo and Julliete by N. Kasatkina and V. Vasilyev. In 1979 she performed the leading role of the Sylph in La Sylphide, staged in Novosibirsk by Pierre Lacotte. Other notable performances:

- Swan Lake (Odette-Odile)
- Giselle (Giselle)
- The Nutcracker (Masha)
- Spartacus (Phrygia)
- La Bayadère (Nikiya)
- Macbeth (Lady Macbeth)
- Juno and Avos (Conchita)

== Awards ==
Lyubov Gershunova was a laureate of the State Prize of the RSFSR (1980), People's Artist of the RSFSR (1982), laureate of the International Ballet Competition in Varna (1972). In addition, the ballerina was awarded the Medal "For Labour Valour" (1970) and the Order of the Red Banner of Labour (1986).
