= Mirta Plá =

Cuban ballerina

Mirta Esteny Plá Cabal (1940 – September 23, 2003) was a Cuban dancer, teacher of ballet, and ballet master. Along with Loipa Araújo, Aurora Bosch, and Josefina Méndez, she is regarded as one of the "four jewels of Cuban ballet". She was a principal artist with the Cuban National Ballet (Ballet Nacional de Cuba; BNC).

== Early years ==
Born in Havana, Plá began her studies at the Conservatorio Municipal de la Habana. She continued her training under Fernando Alonso, Leon Fokine, Alexandra Fedorova, José Parés and Mary Skeaping. She joined the Alicia Alonso Ballet Academy where Bosch remembered Plá as being very skinny with a very long neck. The Romanian ballerina, Mijaela Tesleoanu, recalled that Plá was never hurt nor did she ever complain about discomfort in the ankles, knees or arms.

== Career ==
"Mirta Plá, we remember her not with tears, because those are for those who die, and while a Cuban dancer on stage gives art, as long as the Ballet Nacional de Cuba and the Cuban school of ballet exist, Mirta Pla continues to live among us." -Alicia Alonso

She debuted professionally in 1953, at the age of 13. She was trained at the Ballet Academy run by Alicia Alonso and she became known as one of the "four jewels" with Loipa Araújo, Aurora Bosch, and Josefina Méndez. Alonso's school became the Cuban Ballet School. In 1956 the school lost its funding from the state, but in 1959 the new revolutionary government made ballet into a "national art form". The same year, Plá was promoted to soloist, acquiring the status of principal dancer in 1962.

While still in her youth, Plá was a guest artist in California at the ballet of the Greek Theatre in Los Angeles and the Ballet Celeste in San Francisco. She portrayed the role of Myrtha, Queen of the Willis in the 1963 film of Giselle, by Enrique Pineda Barnet, which was produced by the Instituto Cubano del Arte e Industria Cinematográficos. In 1964 and 1966, she was awarded the silver medal at the Varna International Ballet Competition; she missed the 1965 competition because she was expecting a child. She was a leading dancer and one of the "four jewels" of the first generation of the Cuban National Ballet. However she was based in Barcelona for almost a decade, where she occasionally taught ballet at the Institut del Teatre. She also worked occasionally in Madrid. She died from cancer in Barcelona in 2003, leaving behind a daughter, Lourdes, who also became a ballet dancer and teacher. Giselle Deyá's biography, Mirta Plá: una joya de la cultura cubana, on the prima ballerina was published in 2011.
