= Varna International Ballet Competition =

Biennial ballet competition held in Varna, Bulgaria

The Varna International Ballet Competition is a biennial ballet competition held in Varna, Bulgaria. The competition was founded in 1964 and subsequently held in 1965 and 1966, and then every two years starting in 1968. However the competitions were put on hold starting in the year of the global covid pandemic, 2020. Although bulgarian officials have voiced their intentions to reestablish the competition as soon as 2026, these aspirations have yet to be realized. Many dancers have gained their first international recognition at the competition.

The contest that saw many of its medalist rise to prominence is dubbed in media as "olympics of dance".

== Winners ==
- 1964 : Vladimir Vasiliev, Grand Prix of Varna; Alla Sizova, Ekaterina Maximova, Vera Kirova, Sergei Vikulov, and Nikita Dolgushin (all gold medal)
- 1965 : Natalia Makarova (gold medal), Loipa Araújo (gold medal)
- 1966 : Aurora Bosch (gold medal), Martine van Hamel (distinction, junior division), Mikhail Baryshnikov (first place, junior division)
- 1968 : Marta García (first place, junior division), Rita Poelvoorde (silver medal)
- 1970 : Eva Evdokimova (gold medal), Rosario Suárez (first place, junior division)
- 1972 : Lyubov Gershunova
- 1974 : Fernando Bujones (gold medal), Yoko Morishita (gold medal), Tatyana Kapustina (bronze medal)
- 1976 : Patrick Dupond (Special Prize of the Youth Organization of Varna, junior division)
- 1978 : Élisabeth Platel (silver medal) // René de Cárdenas (best duo, junior division)
- 1980 : Evelyn Hart (gold medal) and David Peregrine (bronze medal) // Karin Averty (Special Prize of the Youth Organization of Varna, junior division)
- 1983 : Sylvie Guillem (Special Prize of the Youth Organization of Varna, junior division)
- 1984 : Manuel Legris
- 1988 : Virginie Kempf (gold medal)
- 1990 : Agnès Letestu (gold medal)
- 1992 : Aurélie Dupont, José Carlos Martinez, (gold medals), Zenaida Yanowsky (silver medal), Yury Yanowsky//Bernard Courtot de Bouteillier, Molly Smolen//Delphine Baey (bronze medals)), Molly Smolen (Prix de Nina Ricci)
- 1994 : Clairemarie Osta (silver medal), Laetitia Pujol (silver medal)
- 1996 : Rasta Thomas (first place, junior)
- 1998 : Zhu Yan (gold Medal) // Chi Cao (gold medal)
- 2000 : Lali Kandelaki, Xiao Feng Fan, Shen Yi Sun (gold medal, seniors)
- 2002 : Hélène Bouchet (silver Medal)
- 2004 : Daniil Simkin (gold medal, junior), Yum Yunesava (first place junior), Arman Grigoryan (gold medal, senior), Mathilde Froustey (gold medal, senior)
- 2006 : Aubert Vanderlinden, Ivan Vasiliev (special prize, junior division)
- 2012 : Brooklyn Mack (gold medal) // Denis Cherevichko (gold medal)
- 2014 : Soo Bin Lee (special distinction), Sara Renda (bronze medal), Ralitsa Ilieva (bronze medal)
- 2016 : Amanda Gomes (gold medal) // Paul Marque (gold medal)
- 2018 : António Casalinho (first place, juniors), Siyi Li (first place, girls), Yuan Zhe Zi Huan (gold medal，women), Katherine Barkman (silver medal), Sinuo Chang (gold medal, men)
