= Yoko Morishita =

Japanese ballerina

Yoko Morishita (森下洋子 Morishita Yoko, born in Hiroshima December 7, 1948) is a Japanese ballerina for Matsuyama Ballet Company.

== Career ==
Morishita started ballet at the age of three. She moved to Tokyo to start her ballet life in 1963 when she was 12 years old. Studied ballet in America in 1969. Morishita entered Matsuyama Ballet Company in 1971. She has been a leader there from 2001.

Performed for the 25th anniversary of the Queen Elizabeth in 1977. *Performed at Palais Garnier as the 1st Japanese ballerina in 1981. Performed with Rudolf Nureyev from 1983. Participates in some international ballet competitions as a judge. One of the Person of Cultural Merit in 1997. Member of The Japan Art Academy from 2002.

== Awards ==
- 1974 Gold Medal at the 1974 Varna International Ballet Competition
- 1975, 1977 Japan Academy Prize
- 1985 Japan Academy of Arts Award
- 1985 10th Laurence Olivier Awards
- 2000 Hiroshima Prefectural Prize of Honour
- 2012 Praemium Imperiale on October 23, 2012.
