= Aubert Vanderlinden =

Belgian dancer and choreographer

Aubert Vanderlinden is an international award winning ballet dancer and choreographer, he was born in 1985, in Uccle, Belgium.

== Career ==
After starting ballet with Piotr Nardelli in Brussels, Aubert Vanderlinden continued his classes at the Paris Opera Ballet school and later on, joined the prestigious ballet company in 2003.

During the season 2004-2005, we could particularly appreciate his talent in the creation of Suzanne Linke ich bin.... With the Paris Opera Ballet, he performed ballets by George Balanchine, Jerome Robbins, William Forsythe, Patrice Bart, Rudolf Noureev and so on. In 2006, Aubert makes his "debut" as a choreographer at the Bastille opera with a piece entitled "In Memoriam".

Among other awards and prizes, Aubert Vanderlinden won the Bronze medal in the senior category of the 22nd international ballet competition of Varna, in Bulgaria.

In 2007, Aubert Vanderlinden joined the San Francisco Ballet. Among other pieces, he danced a principal role in the creation the ruins proclaim the building was beautiful.. choreographed by James Kudelka at the occasion of the new works festival 2008 organized for the 75th anniversary of the San Francisco Ballet, he also danced Ibsen's House of Val Caniparoli created for the same occasion. In San Francisco, Aubert Vanderlinden performed ballets by Antony Tudor, Helgi Tomasson, Jerome Robbins, Yuri Possokhov and so on.

In 2009, Aubert Vanderlinden joined the Dutch National Ballet, he choreographed a piece entitled "Satyriasis" for the 2010 New Moves program of the company.
