= Ballet RI =

American ballet company

Coordinates: 41.84931°N 71.39440°W

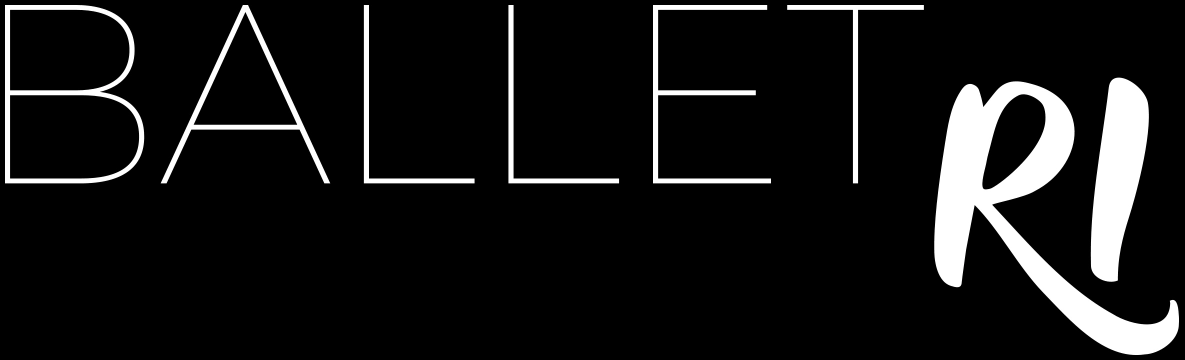

General information
- Name: Ballet RI
- Previous names: Festival Ballet Providence
- Year founded: 1978; 47 years ago
- Website: balletri.org

Senior staff
- Director: Kathleen Breen Combes

Other
- Associated schools: School of Ballet RI

Ballet Rhode Island (Ballet RI), formerly known as "Festival Ballet Providence", is a ballet company located in Providence, Rhode Island, United States. Ballet RI performs at the Veterans Memorial Auditorium, Moses Brown School's Woodman Center, and their own Black Box Theatre.

== History ==
The company was founded in 1978 by Christine Hennessey and Winthrop Corey (1945-2023), former principal dancers with the Royal Winnipeg Ballet. After the death of Hennessey in 1998, Mihailo Djuric took over as Artistic Director, and led the company until 2020. Kathleen Breen Combes has been Director since 2021.

== Leadership ==
Directors:

- Mihailo Djuric, Artistic Director (1998-2020)
- Kathleen Breen Combes Executive Director (beginning 2019), and Director (since 2021)

Ballet RI also runs the School of Ballet RI (formerly Festival Ballet Providence School). School directors:

- Mary Ann Mayer (2004-2018)
- Vilia Putrius (2018-2020)
- Marissa Parmenter (2020-2023)
- Sarah Lane (2023)
- Christopher Anderson (2023-present)
