= Kathleen Breen Combes =

American ballet dancer

- Born: Rockville Centre, New York; United States
- Occupations: ballet dancer; Executive and Artistic Director of Ballet Rhode Island
- Years active: 2000–present
- Spouse: Yury Yanowsky
- Children: 2
- Career
- Current group: Ballet RI
- Former groups: The Washington Ballet, Boston Ballet

Kathleen Breen Combes is an American ballet dancer. She was a principal dancer with the Boston Ballet until 2019, when she retired to join Festival Ballet Providence as executive director. She is now the Director of Ballet Rhode Island

== Early life ==
Breen Combes was born in Rockville Centre, New York. She is of Irish ancestry. She trained in ballet at Fort Lauderdale Ballet Classique, the Harid Conservatory, and The Central Pennsylvania Youth Ballet. The daughter of a Pilates instructor, she became certified in Pilates when she was nineteen years old.

== Career ==
Breen Combes joined The Washington Ballet as an apprentice in 2000 and became a member of main company in 2002. She joined Boston Ballet in 2003. She was promoted to second soloist in 2005, soloist in 2007, and principal dancer in 2009. Her professional repertoire has included classical ballets, neo-classical ballets by George Balanchine, and works by John Cranko, Jiří Kylián, William Forsythe, Christopher Wheeldon, Wayne McGregor, and Jorma Elo. In 2003 she was awarded the Lefkowitz Award for Special Achievement at the New York International Ballet Competition at Lincoln Center. In 2007 she was featured on the cover of Dance Magazine and has also been featured in Pointe. She was nominated for the Prix Benois de la Danse Award in 2012 for her portrayal of Juliet in Romeo and Juliet and Queen Titania in A Midsummer Night's Dream and was later invited to dance at the Bolshoi Theatre.

She has also danced in Don Quixote, Giselle, La Bayadère, The Taming of the Shrew, Lady of the Camellias, Cinderella, The Sleeping Beauty, Swan Lake, The Nutcracker, La Sylphide, Le Spectre de la rose, Spring Waters Pas de Deux, Jewels, Coppélia, Apollo, Symphony in Three Movements, The Four Temperaments, The Prodigal Son, Serenade, La Valse, Episodes, Ballo della Regina, Divertimento No. 15, Mozartiana, Who Cares?, and Allegro Brillante.

== Personal life ==
In 2010 Breen Combes married Spanish ballet dancer and choreographer Yury Yanowsky, who she danced with at Boston Ballet, in a ceremony in the Canary Islands. They have a daughter named Cora, and a son born in 2020

While dancing with Boston Ballet, Breen Combes enrolled at Northeastern University. She graduated in 2016 with a bachelor's degree in organizational communications and management. She is currently in the graduate program for non-profit management. She is the founder of the blog LeadHERship.
