= Wrzeszcz =

District in Gdańsk, Poland

Coordinates: 54°23′N 18°37′E

Location of Wrzeszcz within Gdańsk

Wrzeszcz (pronounced [vʐɛʂt͡ʂ], German: Langfuhr; Kashubian: Wrzészcz) is a former borough of the Northern Polish city of Gdańsk. With a population of more than 65,000 in an area of 9.9 square kilometres (3.8 square miles) (population density 6,622), Wrzeszcz is the most populous part of Gdańsk.

== History ==
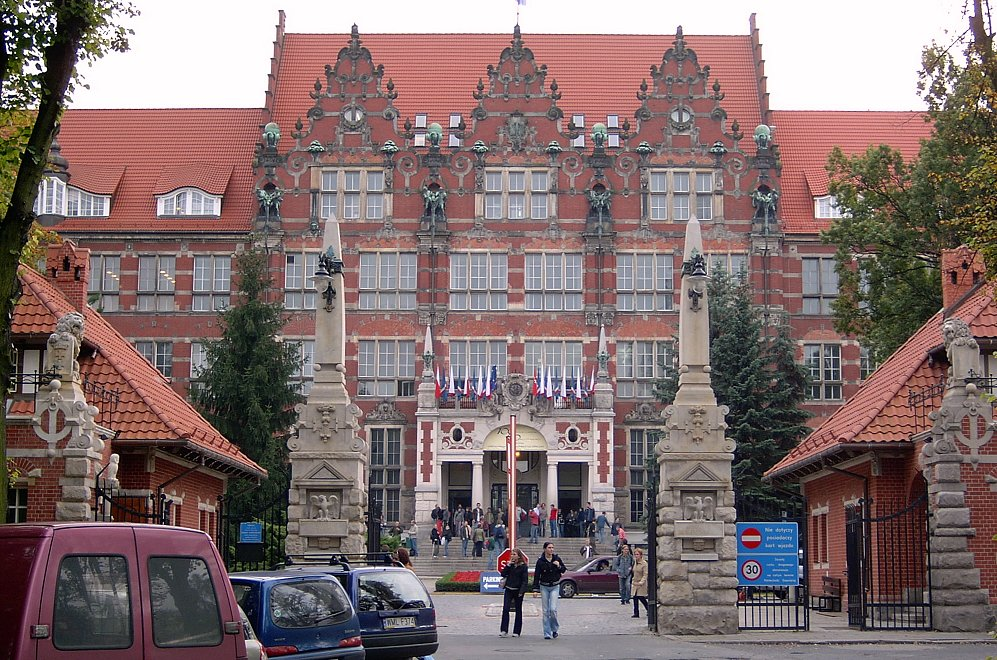
Gdańsk University of Technology (Politechnika Gdańska) in Wrzeszcz. Built in Brick Gothic style, the building originally housed the Königliche Technische Hochschule zu Danzig.

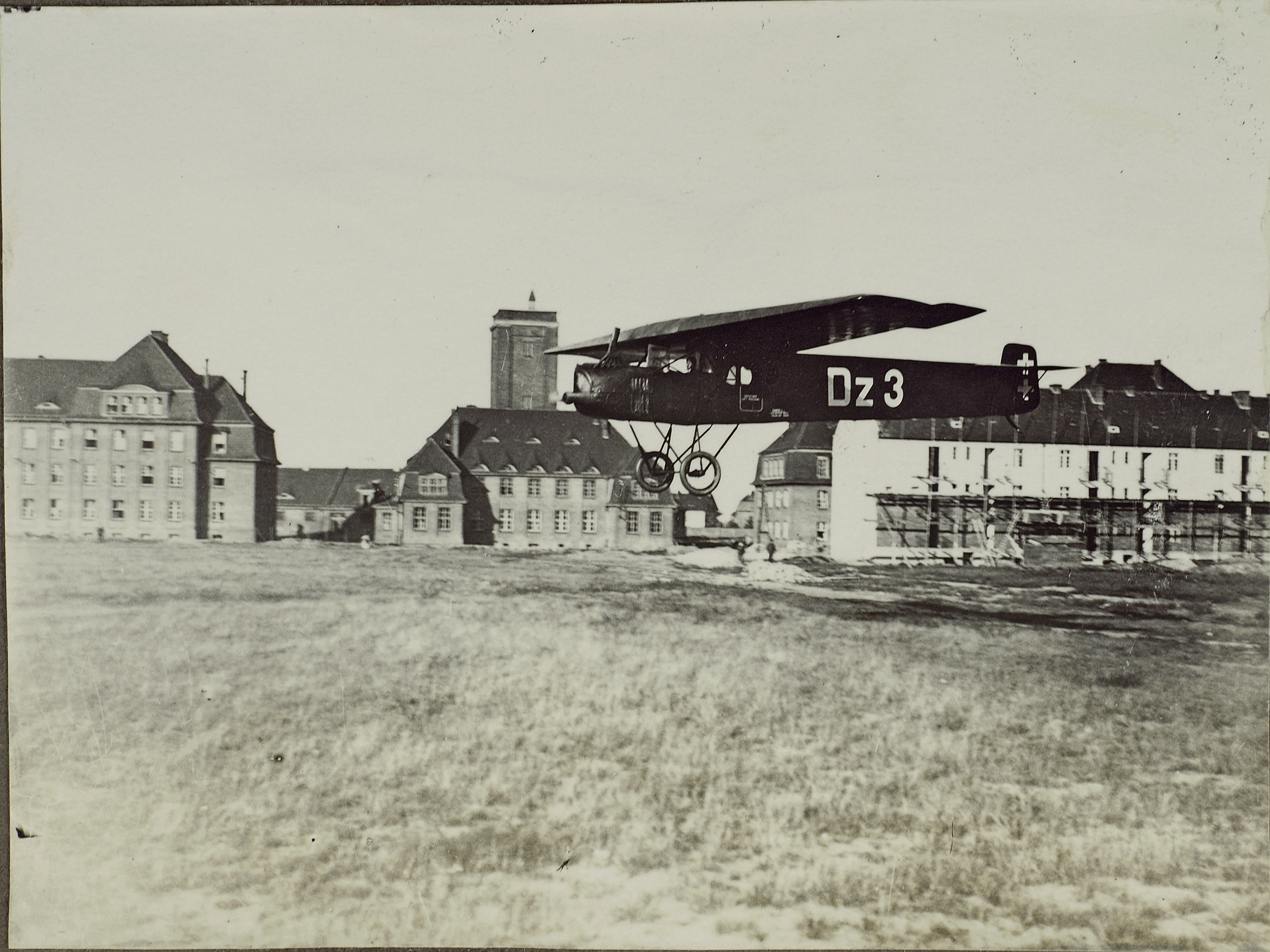
A Fokker F.II of Danziger Luft-Reederei (DzLR) landing at Wrzeszcz airport in 1922.

The current name Wrzeszcz comes from the old name of the area – Wrzost, which derives from wrzos, a Polish and Kashubian word for heather. The area of modern Wrzeszcz used to be forest and fields of heather. In modern Polish, the literal meaning of the word "wrzeszcz" is the second-person singular imperative form of "wrzeszczeć", meaning 'to scream/shout/yell', but this is not related to the etymology of this place name.

Historical sources mention Vriezst in 1263 AD and Vriest 1283 as a place of a mill and by the end of the 13th century the Cistercian Monks of Oliwa owned four or five water mills on the Strieß (Strzyża), the creek running through Wrzeszcz. Vriest is Low German as well as Dutch language word meaning frost.

In 1412 AD, this suburban village was granted to Danzig city councillor Gerd von der Beke, an ally of the Teutonic Knights. The place was known as Langfuhr in the German language.

Early area landowners included the Bischof family, who held the increasingly residential settlement in the late-16th century and early-17th century, and the Köhne family, which started acquiring possessions in the Langfuhr area in 1616 AD. Danzig patrician Zacharias Zappio acquired most of the land between today's Slowackiego and Do Studzienki streets and built a palace there. When King John III Sobieski visited the palace in 1677 AD, the little valley where the palace was located was renamed Königstal (Dolina Krolewska), or King's Valley, to commemorate the occasion. Strictly speaking, in the 17th century the name Langfuhr referred only to a small market square, 130 m by 35 m, on what today is known as Aleja Grunwaldzka.

Between 1767 and 1770, Danzig mayor Daniel Gralath made a personal project of turning the two kilometers of old road between Langfuhr and Danzig proper into the four-lane, tree-lined Grand Avenue, as it was then renamed. Each lane of the avenue was lined by 350 trees imported from the Netherlands, and the entire cost of the project was the immense sum (for the time) of 100,000 guilders.

In the 18th century, residential construction aimed at the wealthy city folk took precedence. The erected residences were mostly classical style with beautiful gardens and the obligatory tree-lined driveways. By 1804, Langfuhr had about 900 residents, most of them working in breweries, distilleries, retailers, and factories making a kind of ash used to bleach cloth.

On 6 December 1807, under French occupation, the Danzig-Prussian convention made the town part of the Napoleonic Free City of Danzig. After the Congress of Vienna of 1814–1815, Danzig was reincorporated into Prussia.

From the mid-19th century onwards, Langfuhr grew to become a fashionable and wealthy borough with beautifully decorated city villas for wealthier residents and even spacious accommodation for local labourers. In 1872, Langfuhr was joined to Danzig by a horse-drawn tram along the Grand Avenue.

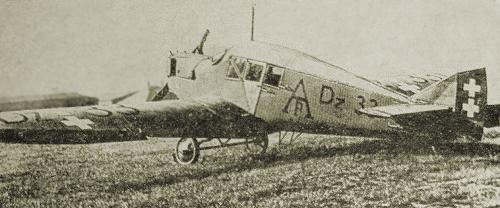
A Junkers F13 with Free City of Danzig markings.

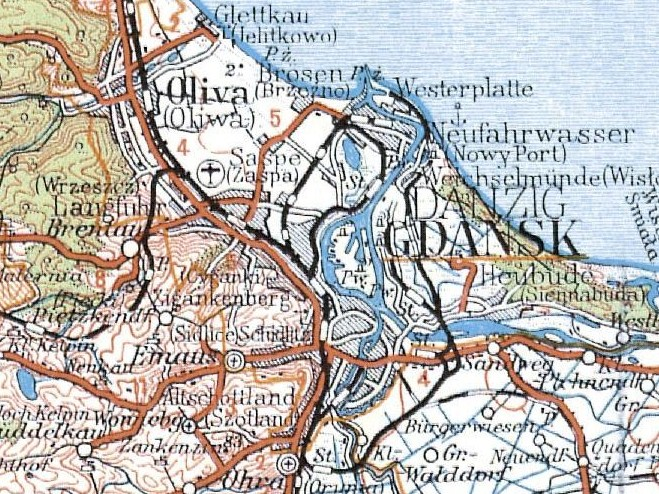
Map of Gdańsk and the Wrzeszcz airport from 1934.

In 1904, the Königliche Technische Hochschule zu Danzig Grand Hall was built, soon followed by the city hospital, which is now the medical academy. Until 1919 Langfuhr was the garrison of the 1st Life Hussar Regiment (since 1901 Brigade) with large barracks built in the 1890s. In 1910 the first airfield of Danzig was established on the hussar's parade ground. After World War I Erhard Milch's "Danziger Luftpost GmbH" (Danzig Airmail) and the "Lloyd Ostflug" were located at Langfuhr.

== Effects of World War II ==
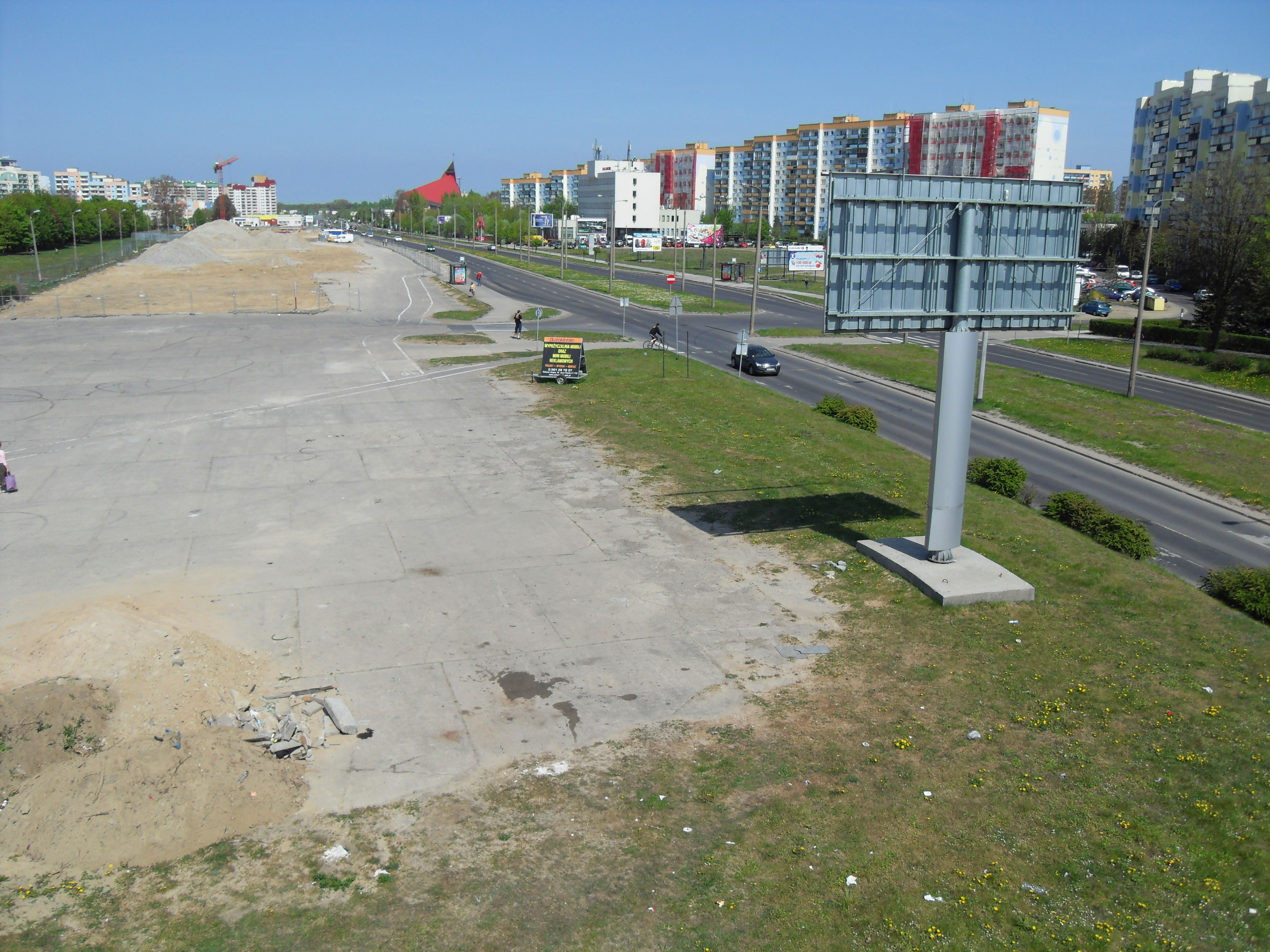
Remains of the runway of the former Wrzeszcz airport running beside Jana Pawła II avenue, May 2011.

After World War II the town became part of Poland according to the Potsdam Conference and renamed to the Polish Wrzeszcz. Its German inhabitants either fled before the advancing Red Army or were expelled. The renaming was based on medieval records but caused the protests of the arriving Polish settlers as it was regarded unpronounceable and has a similarity to the Polish term "wrzeszczeć" (to bellow, to scream).

== Present ==
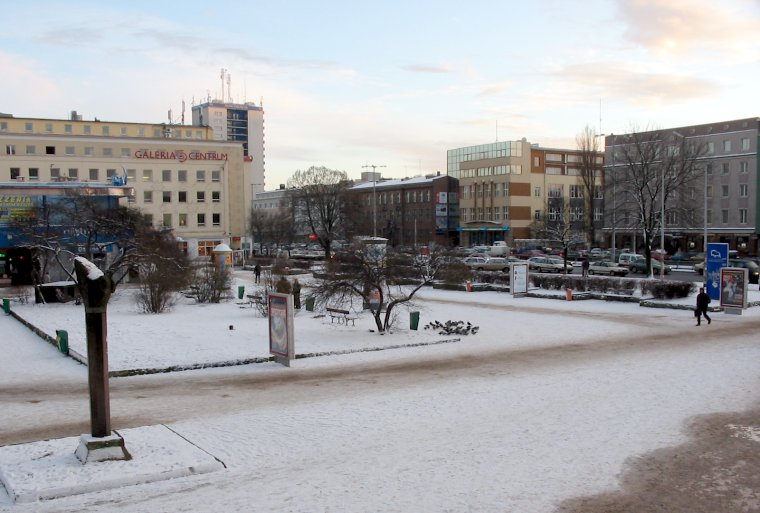
A small garden square on Aleja Grunwaldzka.

The airport was closed and replaced by the Gdańsk Lech Wałęsa Airport in 1974 and large housing complexes have been built on the former airport area. One of the old airport hangars was subsequently converted into a shopping centre, which opened in 1994 and was enlarged and renamed to Galeria Zaspa in 2016.

The borough is now developing rapidly. A great deal of commercial activity (particularly banking and shopping) now takes place in Wrzeszcz. A number of international firms such as Citibank, ING Bank, Fortis Bank, and Shell have chosen to locate their offices there rather than in the Gdańsk city center, large shopping centers such as Galeria Bałtycka and Centrum Handlowe Manhattan are opening along Grunwaldzka Street, and extensive military properties have been sold to housing developers.

== Notable residents ==
- Eddi Arent (1925–2013), actor
- Hermann Balck (1893–1982), general
- Alicja Boniuszko (1937-2019), prima ballerina of the Baltic State Opera
- Siegfried Freytag (1919–2003), Luftwaffe pilot
- Günter Grass (1927–2015), author
- Ulrich Kessler (1894–1983), Luftwaffe general
- Leopold Koss (1920–2012), cytopathologist
- Gerda Steinhoff (1922–1946), Nazi SS concentration camp overseer hung for war crimes
- Joachim von Tresckow (1894–1958), Wehrmacht general
- Wolfgang Völz (1930–2018), actor

== Points of interest ==
- Gdańsk University of Technology (Politechnika Gdańska)
- Gdańsk Medical University
- Baltic Opera
- Gdańsk Wrzeszcz railway station
- Johannes Gutenberg monument, founded 22 June 1890 at Gutenberghain
- New Synagogue
- Garden city Nowe Szkoty
