= Leopold Koss =

- Born: Leopold Kon; October 2, 1920; Langfuhr, Poland
- Died: September 11, 2012 (age 91); New York, New York
- Occupation: pathologist
- Known for: cytopathology research

Leopold George Koss (born Leopold Kon; October 2, 1920 – September 11, 2012) was an American physician, pathologist, and professor at the Albert Einstein College of Medicine. He has been called "one of the founding fathers for the field of cytopathology".

== Biography ==
Koss was born in Langfuhr, Poland. He escaped Nazi persecution in 1942 by entering Switzerland, where he was eventually allowed to continue studying medicine. He received his M.D. degree from the University of Bern, Switzerland in 1946. His parents and sisters were murdered in the Holocaust.

He arrived in the United States in 1947, and did a residency in pathology at Kings County Hospital in Brooklyn, New York. From 1952 to 1970, minus a stint in the Korean War, he was on staff at the Memorial Sloan–Kettering Cancer Center. In 1973, he was named Chairman of the Department of Pathology at Montefiore Medical Center and the Albert Einstein College of Medicine.

== Awards ==
Koss received the Papanicolaou, Goldblatt, and Masubuchi Awards, the Sloan Award in Cancer Research, and the Gold-headed Cane Award from the American Society for Investigative Pathology. He was a distinguished member of the American Society of Cytopathology.

== Works ==
His textbook Koss' Diagnostic Cytology and its Histopathologic Bases, in its fifth edition as of 2005, is considered a classic in the field of cytopathology.

- Diagnostic Cytology and Its Histopathologic Bases, 5th rev. edition 2006
- Tumors of the Urinary Bladder, 1975, Supplement, 1984
- Aspiration Biopsy: Cytologic Interpretation and Histologic Bases, 2d rev. edition 1992
- Introduction to Gynecologic Cytology, 1999
