= Alicja Boniuszko =

Polish ballet dancer and choreographer (1937–2019)

- Born: 16 October 1937; Myadzyel, Second Polish Republic (now in Belarus)
- Died: 23 December 2019 (aged 82); Gdańsk, Poland
- Citizenship: Polish
- Occupation(s): Ballet dancer; ballet teacher; choreographer
- Awards: Order of Polonia Restituta; Medal for Merit to Culture – Gloria Artis

Alicja Boniuszko (1937–2019) was a Polish ballet dancer and choreographer who was involved with the Baltic State Opera in Gdańsk, Poland for many years.

== Early life and training ==
Alicja Boniuszko was born on 16 October 1937 in Myadzyel in what is now Belarus but at the time was in the Second Polish Republic. After 1945, her family moved to the borough of Wrzeszcz in Gdańsk and she began going to ballet lessons soon after. In 1956 she graduated from the State Ballet School in Gdańsk, where she had been taught by Janina Jarzynówna-Sobczak.

== Ballet career ==
In 1956, Boniuszko became a soloist at Baltic Opera, later becoming the prima ballerina. In addition to performing in Poland she appeared on stages in London, New York and Rio de Janeiro, among others. Her most prominent roles included leading roles in Pyotr Ilyich Tchaikovsky's Swan Lake, Juliusz Łucik's Niobe, Prokofiev’s Romeo and Juliet, Karol Szymanowski's Harnasie, Rimsky-Korsakov's Scheherazade and Béla Bartók's The Miraculous Mandarin. In addition to live performances, Boniuszko also appeared in four films as a ballerina, as well as in documentary films.

In 1977, Boniuszko gave up dancing and took up teaching and choreography. She led, among others, classes at the Gdańsk ballet school. She also served as a juror in dance competitions.

== Honours and awards ==
Boniuszko won prizes in several dancing competitions including second prize in the First National Classical Dance competition in Poland in 1959, first prize in Vercelli, Italy in 1960 and third prize in Rio de Janeiro in 1961. In 1985 she was awarded the Officer's Cross of the Order of Polonia Restituta. In 2000, the Gdańsk City Council awarded Boniuszko the Duke Mściwoj II Medal in recognition of all of her cultural activities and for making the name of Gdańsk famous in the country and in the world. In 2009, she was awarded the national Medal for Merit to Culture – Gloria Artis, receiving the gold medal.

== Death ==
Boniuszko died in Gdańsk on 23 December 2019. She is buried at the Łostowicki cemetery in Gdańsk. In 2021 it was proposed that a roundabout in Gdańsk should bear her name.
