= Tatiana Kapustina =

Tatiana Konstantinovna Kapustina (born 14 April 1950) is a Russian ballet master, pedagogue, and ballet soloist.

== Biography ==
Tatiana Kapustina was born on April 14, 1950, in Mytishchi, Moscow Oblast. In 1968, she graduated from the Moscow Choreographic School (pedagogue L. K. Cherkasova).

From 1968 to 1989, she was a ballet soloist at the Novosibirsk Opera and Ballet Theatre.

Since 1980, she has been teaching at the Novosibirsk Choreographic School.

From 1989–1993, Kapustina was a soloist in the Balet Novosibirsk-100 Chamber Theatre.

Since 1998, she has been the ballet master of the Novosibirsk Theatre of Musical Comedy.

Kapustina staged a number of concert performances.

== Awards and honours ==
She won the bronze medal of the Varna International Ballet Competition in 1974.

In 1986, she became an Honored Artist of the RSFSR.

== Solo parts ==
=== Roles in the Novosibirsk Opera and Ballet Theatre ===
- Giselle by Adolphe Adam – Myrtha
- The Fountain of Bakhchisarai by Boris Asafyev – Zarema
- Spartacus by Aram Khachaturian – Aegina
- The Legend of Love by Arif Malikov – Mekhmene Banu
- The Sleeping Beauty by Pyotr Tchaikovsky – Lilac Fairy
- Macbeth by Kirill Molchanov – Macbeth
- Antony and Cleopatra by Eduard Lazarev – Cleopatra

=== Balet Novosibirsk-100 Chamber Theatre ===
- The Miraculous Mandarin by Béla Bartók
- Woman by Luciano Berio (ballet master Mai Murdmaa)
- Who are you, Carmen by Rodion Shchedrin (ballet master S. Kolesnik)
- Medea by Revaz Gabichvadze (ballet master N. Sokovikova, A. Berdyshev)
