= Solange Schwarz =

French ballerina (1910–2000)

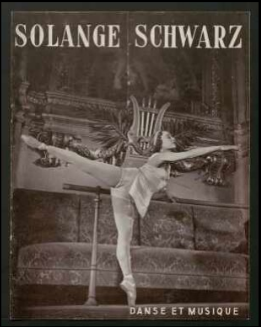
Solange Schwarz, Théâtre des Champs-Élysées programme (1947)

Solange Schwarz (1910–2000) was a French ballerina who trained at the Paris Opera Ballet School. After gaining the rank of danseuse étoile at the Opéra-Comique in 1932, she was the first female dancer to earn the official étoile distinction at the Paris Opera in 1940 for performing the leading role in Serge Lifar's premiere of Entre deux rondes. From 1945, she performed with the Ballets des Champs-Élysées and with the companies created by the Marquis de Cuevas. After retiring from the stage in 1957, she taught dance for over 20 years at the Conservatoire de Paris.

== Early life and family ==
Born in Paris on 12 November 1910, Solange Schwarz was the daughter of the ballet dancer and teacher Jean Schwarz and his wife Eugénie née Nibert. Her aunt Jeanne Schwarz was a star dancer with the Paris Opera Ballet and her sisters Nelly, Janine and Christiane also danced there. It was therefore no surprise that she became a pupil at the Opera Ballet School.

== Career ==
Schwarz joined the Opera Ballet in 1930 but left for the Opéra Comique in 1937 where she immediately became an étoile, performing in Le Lac des cygnes, La Rosière du village, Reflets and Marcel Delannoy's La Pantoufle de vair. She returned to the Paris Opera in 1937 where in 1940 she became the first female dancer to be officially named an étoile after partnering Serge Lifar in his Entre deux rondes. While with the Opera Ballet, she also performed in Lifar's Bacchus et Ariane (1931), Alexandre le Grand (1937), Le Chevalier et la Demoiselle (1941) and Suite en Blanc (1943).

After the end of World War II, together with Lifar she left the Opera to perform with the Ballets des Champs-Élysées, the Opéra-Comique (1949–51) and the companies founded by the Marquis de Cuevas. One of her most successful roles was Swanhilda in Coppélia, which she performed for the last time at the Paris Opera the night of her retirement from the stage in 1957. Thereafter, she taught dance for over 20 years at the Conservatoire de Paris.

Solange Schwarz died at Ramatuelle in the Var department on 24 April 2000.
