= Xavier Torres =

Xavier Torres may refer to:

- Xavi Torres (born 1986), Spanish footballer
- Xavier Enrique Torres, Puerto Rican actor
- Xavier Navarro de Torres (born 1956), Spanish painter and sculptor
