= Josette Amiel =

French ballet dancer and dance teacher (born 1930)

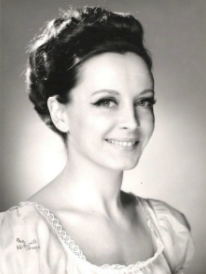
Josette Amiel

Josette Amiel (born 1930) has enjoyed a long career as a French ballerina, dance teacher and choreographer. After studying under Jeanne Schwarz, she made her debut at the Ballets des Champs-Élysées in 1948, then enjoyed four years with the Opéra-Comique. She joined the Paris Opera Ballet in 1952, becoming a danseuse étoile in 1958. Amiel is remembered not only for excelling in classical works but for creating modern roles, for example in Serge Lifar's Chemin de Lumières and Flemming Flindt's La Leçon. After leaving the Paris Opera in 1972, she continued to dance until 1980 when she retired from the stage to teach at the Paris Opera Ballet. From 1986, she directed Harald Lander's Études for presentations at several different ballet companies. Amiel was honoured as a commander of the Legion of Honour in 2012.

== Early life and education ==
Born on 19 November 1930 in Vanves, a suburb of Paris, Josette Amiel was the daughter of two musicians. Her father was a violinist and her mother a pianist. In addition to learning to play the piano from an early age, she attended acrobatics courses given by Robert Quinault. His wife encouraged Amiel to join her dancing class. She went on to study at the Conservatoire de Paris under Jeanne Schwarz, winning the school's first prize in 1947.

== Career ==
After making her debut in 1948 at the Ballets des Champs-Elysées under an assumed name, she was engaged the same year by the Opéra-Comique where she quickly attained the rank of première danseuse. She performed in a variety of works, including The Nutcracker and Les Sylphides, and took part among others in the company's premieres of La Boutique fantasque, L'Amour sourcier, Le Tricorne and La Valse.

When the Opéra-Comique was dissolved in 1952, Amiel joined the Paris Opera Ballet. For the next three years she was a pupil of Carlotta Zambelli who trained her in the role of Coppélia, leading to her attaining the rank of première danseuse in 1955. Following her performance in the leading role of Lifar's Chemin de Lumières, she was ranked étoile in 1958.

Thanks to her technique, she was cast in the leading roles of the Paris Opera's classical repertoire, including Giselle, Sleeping Beauty and the company's premiere of Swan Lake in December 1960. She also performed in the premiere of Anton Dolin's Pas de Quatre and appeared in productions by George Balanchine including The Four Temperaments, Serenade and Scotch Symphony.

Amiel appeared internationally with the Dane Flemming Flindt, premiering Le Jeune Homme à marier and La Leçon.

On leaving the Paris Opera in 1972, she continued to perform for leading ballet companies. From 1980 to 1997, she taught at the Paris Opera and trained dancers including Agnès Letestu, Ghislaine Fallou, Carole Arbo, Marie-Claude Pietragalla, José Martinez and Elizabeth Maurin. In parallel she produced Harald Lander's Etudes for a number of the world's leading ballet companies.

== Awards ==
For her services to French culture, Amiel was honoured as a commander of the Legion of Honour in 2012 and as a commander of the Ordre national du Mérite in 2018.
