= Yury Yanowsky =

Spanish ballet dancer and choreographer

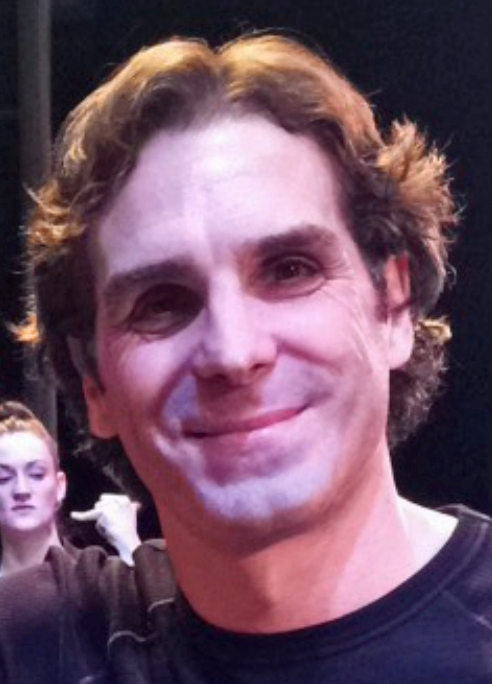
- Yury Yanowsky in 2016
- Born: 1972 (age 53–54); Lyon, France
- Occupations: Ballet dancer, choreographer
- Spouse: Kathleen Breen Combes
- Children: 3

Yury Yanowsky (born 1972 in Lyon, France) is a French-born Spanish ballet dancer and choreographer. He was a principal dancer with the Boston Ballet.

== Early life and training ==
Yury Yanowsky was born in Lyon, France to Russian ballet dancer Anatol Yanowsky and Spanish ballet dancer Carmen Robles, whom were both dancers with the Lyon Opera Ballet. He is the older brother of former Royal Ballet principal dancer Zenaida Yanowsky and Royal New Zealand Ballet dancer Nadia Yanowsky. As a child he lived in Lyon for four years before moving to Rome, then Madrid, and then Las Palmas, Gran Canaria in the Canary Islands.

Yanowsky began training in ballet, along with his sisters, at a dance school which was run by their parents. He was the recipient of the first prize at the Prix de Lausanne in Lausanne, Switzerland and won silver medals at the Varna International Ballet Competition in Varna, Bulgaria and the International Ballet Competition in Jackson, Mississippi.

== Career ==
Yanowsky joined the corps de ballet at Boston Ballet in 1993 after seeing the company perform on tour in Spain. He was promoted to the rank of principal dancer in 1999. Throughout his career at Boston Ballet, Yanowsky danced many lead roles including Prince Siegfried in Swan Lake, Duke Albrecht of Silesia in Giselle, Basilio in Don Quixote, Oberon in A Midsummer Night's Dream, Count Dracula in Dracula, and Franz in Coppélia. He also danced secondary roles including Hilarion in Giselle, Lensky in Onegin, Tybalt in Romeo and Juliet, and Pinkerton in Madame Butterfly. He danced with the Boston Ballet for twenty-two years before retiring from dancing to focus on his work as a choreographer.

Yanowsky has choreographed numerous ballets for the Boston Ballet, Boston Ballet II, Bundes Jugend Ballet Hamburg, Ballet RI, Carlos Acosta's Premiere's Plus, and for international galas. In 2015 he was awarded the Choreographic Prize at the Erik Bruhn Competition for his ballet, District. He was the guest choreographer for the Opening Night Gala for the Ballet Program at Jacob's Pillow Dance in 2016.

Yanowsky serves on the faculty at Centro Coreographico and Las Palmas Spain and has taught at Boston Ballet, Joffrey Ballet, Harvard University, and Colby College.

== Personal life ==
Yanowsky married fellow Boston Ballet principal dancer Kathleen Breen Combes in 2010 at ceremony in the Canary Islands. The couple has one daughter, Cora, and a son born in 2020. Yanowsky also has a son born in 1995, Yuri, who is a chef in Berlin.
