= Jeanne Schwarz =

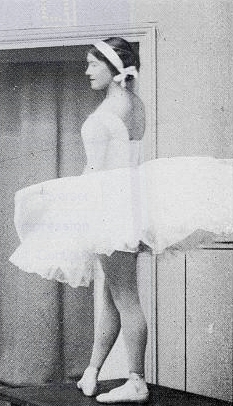
Jeanne Schwarz

Jeanne Schwarz (1887–1970) was a French ballerina and dance teacher. After joining the Paris Opera Ballet in 1904, she became an étoile in 1919, performing in leading roles until she left the company in 1928. She spent the remainder of her career teaching at the Conservatoire de Paris until her retirement in 1957.

== Early life and education ==
Born on 22 July 1887 in the Montmartre district of Paris, Jeanne Schwarz was the sister of the celebrated ballet teacher Jean Schwarz and the aunt of the étoile dancer Solange Schwarz. From age seven, she attended the Paris Ballet School as a pupil of Berthe Bernay, appearing on stage in 1887 as a little rat. Later teachers included Léo Staats and Blanche d'Alessandri-Valdine.

== Career ==
Schwarz joined the Paris Opera Ballet in 1904 and was given the then unofficial title of étoile in 1919. An early success was her appearance in Le Spectre de la rose with Vaslav Nijinsky at the American Embassy in Madrid, earning her congratulations from King Alfonso XIII. Partnering leading dancers such as Gustave Ricaux, Albert Aveline and Paul Raymond, she was particularly effective in works including Les Abeilles, Maîmouna, Castor et Pollux, Les Troyens, Thaïs, Coppélia, la Maladetta, Sylvia and la Damnation de Faust.

In 1928, Schwarz left the stage to teach at the Conservatoire de Paris, heading the women's class from 1939. Students included Violette Verdy, Leslie Caron and Josette Amiel. On her retirement in 1957, her post was taken over by her niece Solange Schwarz.

Jeanne Schwarz died in Paris on 31 October 1970, aged 83.
