= Sergei Vikulov =

- Born: June 24, 1957 (age 69) Chita, Soviet Union
- Height: 6 ft 0 in (183 cm)
- Weight: 189 lb (86 kg; 13 st 7 lb)
- Position: Defender
- Shot: Right
- Played for: Dinamo Riga; HC Izhstal; Traktor Chelyabinsk; HC Dynamo Minsk; EC Ratinger Löwen; Kassel Huskies; ETC Crimmitschau
- Playing career: 1977–2000

Sergei Vikulov (born 24 July 1957), is former Russian professional ice-hockey player who spent most of his career in Soviet ice-hockey league. Later in his career he also played in DEL and Danish league.
