= Melania Ballish Regueiro =

Ballet Director

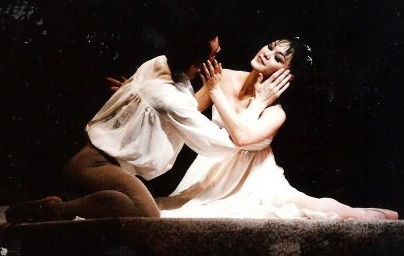
Melania Ballish Regueiro (Lopez) dancing the title role in Romeo and Juliet at Rostock Volkstheater in 1998.

Melania Ballish Regueiro (née Lopez) is the artistic director of The Classical Ballet Centre in Summerville, South Carolina, USA.

== Career ==
A retired Prima Ballerina. Regueiro won the Bronze in the prestigious Brasilia International Dance Competition in 1992. She left home at the age of 14 to join the Cuban National Youth Ballet Company. In 1995 she moved to Germany, joining the Volkstheater Rostock under the direction of Itchko Lazarov. In Rostock, she rose eventually to become Prima Ballerina, and danced many principal roles including Carmen, Juliet, and Giselle.

As a teacher, Regueiro has presented students at the Youth American Grand Prix. She is on the faculty at the Chautauqua Institution, is an American Ballet Theatre affiliate teacher, and has judged competitions internationally, including the Entreatos International Festival in Porto Real, Brazil.
