= Josefina Méndez =

Cuban ballerina and ballet mistress

Josefina Méndez (nickname Yuyi; 8 March 1941 – 26 January 2007) was a Cuban ballet dancer and ballet mistress. Along with Loipa Araújo, Aurora Bosch, and Mirta Plá, she is regarded as one of the "Four jewels of Cuban ballet". Her style was noted for poetic play with subtlety and discipline. She was a principal artist with the Cuban National Ballet (Ballet Nacional de Cuba; BNC). She received the National Order of the Legion of Honour of France.

== Career ==
Born in Havana in 1941, Méndez studied music at home while enrolled in the Alicia Alonso Ballet Academy. She joined the BNC in 1955, debuting on March 27 in Swan Lake in a man's role because the company was experiencing a shortage of men at that time. She left for the US within a couple of years and joined the troupe of the Greek Theatre in Los Angeles, California, before touring with Ballet Celeste, and returning to Cuba in 1959. By 1962, she was the BNC's principal dancer. In the same year, she received the title of Profesora Fundadora at the National Art Schools, serving as professor of ballet for several years. She medalled at the Varna International Ballet Competition in 1964 (bronze) and 1965 (silver).

Méndez was a visiting professor of ballet at the Municipal Theatre of Santiago, Compañía de Ballet de Teatro de Bellas Artes de México, and Opéra national du Rhin. She served as prima ballerina of the Cuban National Ballet (BNC) for more than three decades. After retiring from dancing in 1996, she continued as the company's ballet mistress. With the increasing blindness of the BNC's founder, Alicia Alonso, Méndez took a greater leadership role with the Cuban National Ballet. Married to Carlos Gilí, their son, Víctor Gilí, is primo ballerino at the BNC. In 2003, she was awarded the National Prize for Dance, with Araujo, Bosh and Pla. She died in Havana in 2007 of cancer.
