= Nadia Yanowsky =

Spanish ballet dancer

- Born: Madrid, Spain
- Occupation: Ballet dancer
- Years active: 2002 - present
- Career
- Current group: Royal New Zealand Ballet
- Former groups: English National Ballet; Berlin State Ballet; Dutch National Ballet

Nadia Yanowsky is a Spanish ballet dancer.

== Early life and family ==
Yanowsky was born in Madrid and raised in Las Palmas, Gran Canaria in the Canary Islands. She is the daughter of Russian ballet dancer Anatol Yanowsky and Spanish ballet dancer Carmen Robles, who both danced with the Lyon Opera Ballet. She is the sister of ballet dancers Yury Yanowsky and Zenaida Yanowsky. She began her ballet training at a school run by her parents and won a silver medal and audience prize at the Luxemburg International Ballet Competition.

== Career ==
Yanowsky began her professional career in 2002 at the English National Ballet. In 2003 she joined the Berlin State Ballet and was promoted to demi-soloist. In 2008 she moved to Amsterdam and joined the Dutch National Ballet as grand sujet, and was promoted to the rank of soloist two years later. In 2018 she joined the Royal New Zealand Ballet and made her debut as the Sugar Plum Fairy in Val Caniparoli's The Nutcracker.

Throughout her career Yanowsky has danced lead roles in many classical ballets including Romeo and Juliet, Giselle, Carmen, Swan Lake, Paquita, La Bayadère, Les Sylphides, Cinderella, The Sleeping Beauty, The Nutcracker, Coppélia, The Rite of Spring and Le Corsaire, and lead roles in Balanchine works including Serenade, Agon, Symphony in C, Concerto Barocco, Symphony in Three Movements and Violin Concerto. Yanowsky has also performed in works by William Forsythe, Hans van Manen, Wayne McGregor, Christopher Wheeldon, John Neumeier, Maurice Béjart, Uwe Scholz, Angelin Preljocaj, Rudi van Dantzig, and David Dawson.
