= Sarah Lane =

American ballet dancer (born 1984)

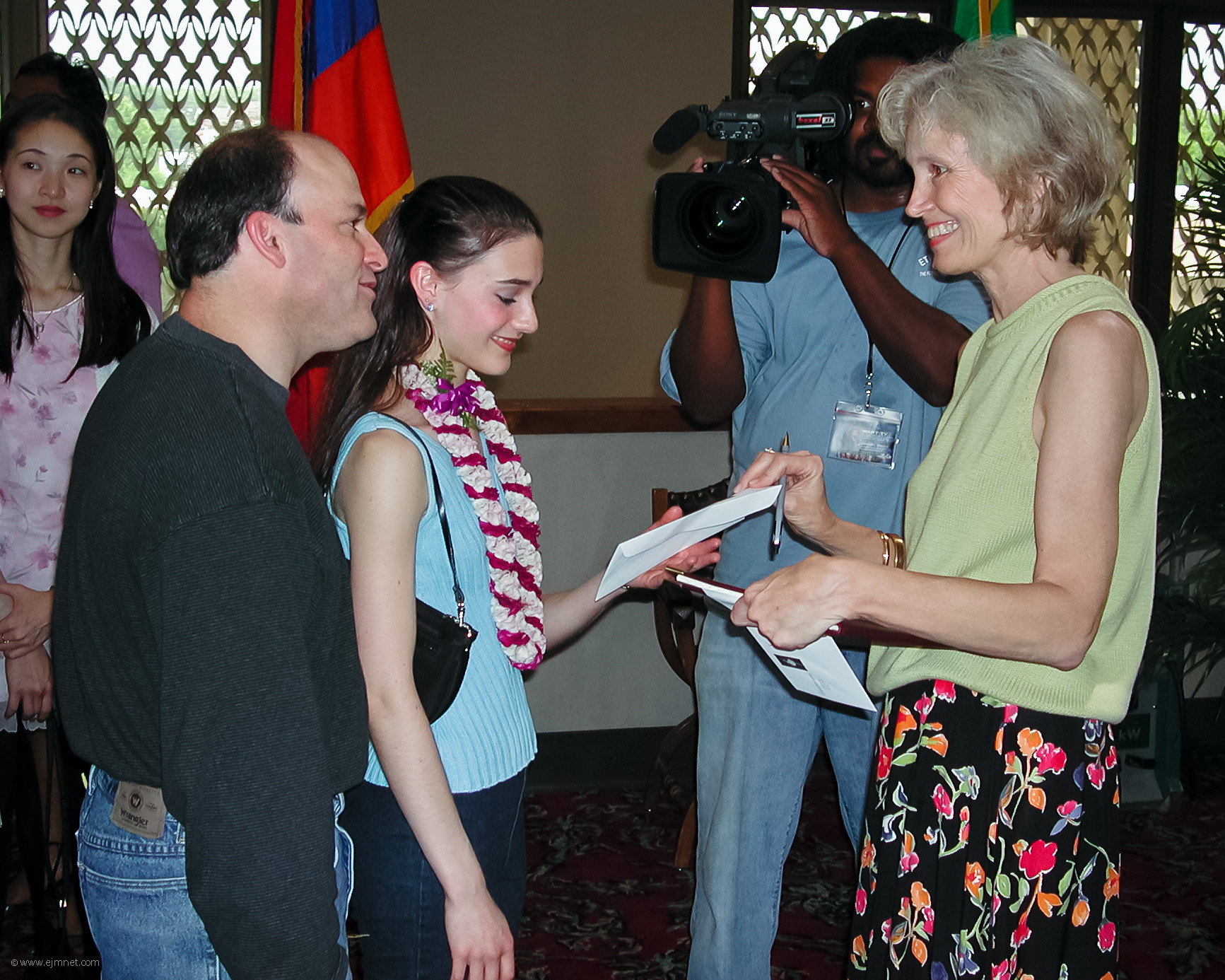
- Lane receiving prize money at USA IBC in 2002
- Born: August 3, 1984 (age 42); San Francisco, California, U.S.
- Education: Draper Center for Dance; Boston Ballet
- Occupation: Ballet dancer
- Years active: 2003–present
- Spouse: Luis Ribagorda (m. 2007)

Sarah Lane (born August 3, 1984) is an American ballet dancer. She was a principal dancer with American Ballet Theatre (ABT). Lane served as a "dance double" for Natalie Portman in the 2010 film Black Swan.

== Early life ==
Lane was born in San Francisco, California. She started training for dance at Classical Ballet Memphis in Memphis, Tennessee. After her family moved to Rochester, New York she continued her training at the Draper Center for Dance Education. At age 16, she attended the Boston Ballet's Summer Program on a full scholarship. At the North American Ballet Festival in 2000 and 2001, she won first place and received the Capezio Class Excellence Award.

In 2002, Lane received the highest medal in the Junior Division of the Jackson International Ballet Competition. During that time, she also performed at the Kennedy Center in Washington, D.C., as a presidential scholar in the arts. Also in 2002, she won the bronze medal at the Youth America Grand Prix Competition. Lane is a YoungArts alumnus.

== Career ==
Lane joined American Ballet Theatre as an apprentice in August 2003 and became a member of the company's corps de ballet in April 2004. She was the June 2007 cover model for Dance Magazine. She was appointed a Soloist in August 2007 and was promoted to Principal Dancer in September 2017. Her promotion was announced following four successful role debuts - the titular role in Giselle, Odette/Odile in Swan Lake, and a leading role in Souvenir d'un lieu cher - as part of ABT's 2017 season at the Metropolitan Opera House. She also originated the role of Princess Praline in Whipped Cream.

In February 2020, Lane starred in the Richmond Ballet's "Swan Lake," partnered by Cory Stearns, a day after performing "Giselle" in DC. The scheduled Chinese National Ballet dancers had been unable to travel. The New York Times called Lane's debut in Giselle “distinguished.” Her term with ABT ended in 2020. In 2023, she briefly became Director of the School of Ballet RI before resigning in December of 2023.

=== Black Swan ===
Lane served as a "dance double" for Natalie Portman in the 2010 film Black Swan, a psychological thriller about ballet dancers in New York City. In a March 3 blog entry for Dance Magazine, editor-in-chief Wendy Perron asked, "Do people really believe that it takes only one year to make a ballerina? We know that Natalie Portman studied ballet as a kid and had a year of intensive training for the film, but that doesn't add up to being a ballerina. However, it seems that many people believe that Portman did her own dancing in Black Swan." This led to responses from Benjamin Millepied and Aronofsky, who both defended Portman, as well as a response from Lane on the subject.

== Personal life ==
In December 2007, Lane married Luis Ribagorda, a member of the ABT's corps de ballet. They reside in Jersey City, New Jersey.

== Selected repertoire ==
Lane's repertory with the American Ballet Theatre includes:

- Nikiya and a Shade - La Bayadère
- Galya - The Bright Stream
- The Fairy Spring - Frederick Ashton’s Cinderella
- Blossom - James Kudelka’s Cinderella
- Swanilda - Coppélia
- Gulnare - Le Corsaire
- Kitri, Amour and a flower girl - Don Quixote
- Flames of Paris pas de deux
- Giselle and the peasant pas de deux - Giselle
- Columbine in Harlequinade
- Mrs. Fairfax in Jane Eyre
- The title role - Manon
- Vera - A Month in the Country
- Clara, the Princess - Alexei Ratmansky’s The Nutcracker
- Olga - Onegin
- Other Dances
- One of Juliet’s friends - Romeo and Juliet
- Sinatra Suite
- Princess Aurora and Princess Florine - Ratmansky’s The Sleeping Beauty
- The Young Girl in Le Spectre de la Rose
- Odette/Odile, the pas de trois, Polish Princess and a little swan - Swan Lake
- Waltz - Les Sylphides
- A Goat - Sylvia
- The lead - Theme and Variations
- Bach Partita
- Drink to Me Only With Thine Eyes
- Bach Partita
- Raymonda Divertissements
- Souvenir d'un lieu cher
- Symphony in C

=== Created roles ===
- Chinese Dance - Alexei Ratmansky’s The Nutcracker
- The Rose - The Seasons
- The Fairy Miettes qui tombent (Breadcrumb) - Ratmansky’s The Sleeping Beauty
- Miranda - The Tempest
- Princess Praline - Whipped Cream
- Dream within a Dream (deferred)
- Private Light

== Publications ==
- "My (Double) Life as a Black Swan." The Wall Street Journal, March 30, 2011.
