= Aurora Bosch =

Cuban dancer and teacher of ballet

- Born: Aurora de los Ángeles Bosch Fernández; December 10, 1942 (age 82); Havana, Cuba
- Career
- Former groups: Cuban National Ballet
- Dances: Ballet

Aurora de los Ángeles Bosch Fernández (born December 10, 1942) is a Cuban dancer and teacher of ballet. Along with Loipa Araújo, Josefina Méndez, and Mirta Plá, she is regarded as one of the "four jewels of Cuban ballet". She was a principal artist with the Cuban National Ballet (Ballet Nacional de Cuba; BNC).

== Early years ==
Bosch was born in Havana. In 1951, after her family saw an advertisement in the newspaper, Bosch received a scholarship to attend the Alicia Alonso Ballet Academy, now the Cuban National Ballet School. There, she trained with Magda González Mora, José Parés and Fernando Alonso. Her stage debut occurred with the Ballet Alicia Alonso, now the BNC, in 1954 in a production of Swan Lake.

== Career ==
She joined the BNC company in 1956. However, her small stature initially prevented her from assuming roles of relevance, relegating her to the corps de ballet. But in her first year, before the temporary closure of the BNC, a ballerina was absent for a performance in Matanzas, and Bosch was asked to take her place in Les Sylphides, where she made her true professional debut in a leading role. In 1958, Alicia Alonso asked Bosch to participate in the corps de ballet of Giselle at the Greek Theatre in Los Angeles, and the following year the ballet Coppélia. While in California, she also performed with Ballet Celeste in San Francisco. At the same time, Bosh began a long career as a ballet teacher at Alicia Alonso school.

In 1959 the new revolutionary Cuban government made ballet into a "national art form" and Bosch having completed her studies, participated in ballet auditions at the newly formed BNC. In the same year, she made an extensive tour of South America with the company and the following year to Mexico and Eastern Europe, which lasted until 1961. Promoted to the rank of soloist in 1962, she gradually assumed roles within the company's traditional and contemporary repertoire. In 1963, she portrayed one of the friends in the Enrique Pineda Barnet film Giselle, which was produced by the Instituto Cubano del Arte e Industria Cinematográficos and starring Alicia Alonso. In 1967, she was promoted to prima ballerina at the BNC and still later served as ballet master. At an invitation from José Antonio Ruiz, she taught at the Ballet Nacional de España. She was associated with the Ballet Clásico de México, Ballet Independiente y Ballet Clásico, Romanian National Opera, Moscow Ballet, Ballet de Victor Ullate, Royal Ballet of Denmark, International Summer Stage of Madrid, Ballet Zurich, Boston Ballet, Central School of Ballet London, National Ballet Hungary and the Vienna State Opera. She also participated in the international dance festivals in Chicago and in Monte Carlo.

== Awards ==
- Anna Pavlova prize, Dance University in Paris
- Dance Critics Special Prize, France
- Gold Medal, Instituto Nacional de Bellas Artes y Literatura
- International Sagitario de Oro Art Prize, Italy
- Medal Dance Merit, Brazilian Dance Council
- 1965, Varna International Ballet Competition, Silver Medal
- 1966 Varna, Gold Medal
- 2003, National Dance Prize, Unión de Escritores y Artistas de Cuba (UNEAC) and National Council of Performing Arts
- 2005, Emeritus Member, UNEAC
