= Academic ranks in Finland =

The following are academic ranks in the Finnish higher education system. There are a specific number of posts, which can be applied to when they are vacated or established.

== Professors ==
Finland's system is similar to the traditional German system in that there is a limited number of posts for professors (professori), who head research groups, and take part in administration in addition to lecturing and thesis supervision. Fulfillment of a professor's post often requires that the previous professor has retired. Traditionally, there was no assistant / associate / full professor career track, nor an official "tenure track". The title of apulaisprofessori ("assistant professor") was retired in 1998, but reintroduced in 2010.

Qualifications for a professor's position are a doctoral degree and an extensive independent publication and teaching record. It is typical, but not mandatory, for the newly recruited professors to hold the title of docent.

=== Honorary ===
In Finland, Professori can, in addition to denoting an academic rank, also be an honorary title, awarded usually to heads of certain research organisations as well as to particularly distinguished creative professionals by the President upon recommendation of the Title Board of the Prime Minister's Office.

== Teachers and researchers ==
Tenure track positions ranking below the rank of full professor are called associate professor and assistant professor, for which various translations are in use. Non-tenure track positions ranking below the (full) professor are "yliopistonlehtori" (senior lecturer; literally "university lecturer"), or "yliopistotutkija" (senior researcher; literally "university researcher"), which are roughly equivalent to a senior lecturership/readership in the UK or an associate professorship in the US. The honorary title of dosentti, also called dosentuuri (Title of Docent) is similar in required qualifications, but the related form of employment is often task-based (e.g., teaching a specific course, supervising a specific student) rather than full-time employment. When it does include full-term employment, it has fewer or no administrative responsibilities and may be combined with work at a company or another university. The alternative translation for docent is "associate professor" or "adjunct professor".

Mid-level educators and researchers are called by lehtori (lecturer), tutkijatohtori (postdoctoral researcher), and opettava tutkija (teaching researcher). However, due to the poor opportunities to advance career-wise (e.g. to obtain a tenured or tenure-track position as senior lecturer/researcher, or assistant/associate/full professor), researchers might be stuck with positions such as tutkijatohtori for quite some time, even if they have already acquired the honorary Title of Docent.

Junior educators and researchers are called by terms such as assistentti (literally "assistant" and is typically a position designed for PhD students), tohtorikoulutettava (doctoral trainee), jatko-opiskelija (doctoral student), projektitutkija (project researcher), väitöskirjatutkija (PhD researcher), or yliopisto-opettaja (literally "university teacher").

Researchers and professors funded by the Academy of Finland are generally styled accordingly, "akatemiatutkija" and "akatemiaprofessori" (academy researcher and academy professor, respectively).

== Academic Positions ==
=== Professors and tenure track ===
- Professori (Professor) is the highest non-administrative position and the third position of the tenure track. Generally, professors have a permanent work contract.
- Associate professor, translated as apulaisprofessori, tenure track -professori or professori (associate) is a mid-level tenure track position between the full professor and the assistant professor. The position can be either a fixed-term or a permanent position. Typically, a doctoral degree and a qualification as a Docent is expected.
- Assistant professor, translated as nuorempi apulaisprofessori, apulaisprofessori, tenure track -tutkija or professori (assistant) is the entry-level tenure track position for which a doctoral degree is required.

=== Research track ===
- Yliopistotutkija (Senior Research Fellow), a position for a senior researcher. Typically, post-doctoral experience and/or a qualification as a Docent is expected.
- Tutkijatohtori (Post-Doctoral Researcher), a position for a junior post-doctoral researcher.
- Tohtorikoulutettava or väitöskirjatutkija (Doctoral student), tutkija (Research Associate, Research Scientist) and projektitutkija (Project Researcher) are positions intended for doctoral students
- Tutkimusavustaja or tutkimusapulainen (Research Assistant) is a Bachelor's or Master's student position.

=== Teaching track ===
- Vanhempi yliopistonlehtori (Senior University Lecturer), a senior faculty position indicating experience, expertise and excellent teaching merits. Research and teaching, PhD required.
- Yliopistonlehtori (University Lecturer), tenured faculty position involving both research and teaching. Usually PhD degree required.
- Lehtori (Lecturer) used only at some universities; a mid-level title between a university teacher and university lecturer. Being phased out.
- Yliopisto-opettaja or yliopistonopettaja (University Teacher), a junior teaching-oriented faculty position.
- Tutkijaopettaja or opettava tutkija (Senior Instructor), a non-tenured senior position involving both research and teaching. Being phased out.

=== Administrative positions ===
- Rehtori (Rector) or kansleri (Chancellor) is the highest official of a university.
- Dekaani (Dean) leads a faculty.
- Yksikönjohtaja (Head of Unit) leads a laboratory or a unit. This position is typically held by a professor.
- Laboratorioinsinööri (Laboratory Engineer), a formally administrative position, the holders of which often conduct research and teach, however.
- Laboratorioteknikko (Laboratory Technician), a junior administrative position similar to Laboratory Engineer

=== Obsolete positions ===
- Yliassistentti (Senior Assistant), post-doctoral researcher or senior doctoral student position.
- Assistentti (Assistant), a teaching-oriented position intended for doctoral students.

=== Related titles ===
- Dosentti (Title of Docent) is a title equivalent to that of an associate professor and bestows the right to teach (Latin: venia legendi) and supervise doctoral students independently. The title also gives the right to act as a principal investigator. Similarly to German Privatdozent and Swedish docent, receiving the title requires academic merits significantly exceeding a doctoral degree. The Docents' Association of the University of Helsinki recommends use of associate professor for docents in Finland but this can be confusing as associate professor is also a tenure track title in some Finnish universities. From 1994 to 2009, the designation docent also referred to a position, which sometimes caused confusion.

== Typical organisational hierarchy ==
- Kansleri (Chancellor), only in the Universities of Helsinki and Åbo Akademi.
- Rehtori (Rector)
- Vararehtori (Vice Rector)
- Dekaani (Dean)
- Laitoksen johtaja or osastonjohtaja (Head of Department)
- Professori (Professor)
