= Marta García (dancer) =

Cuban ballet dancer and prima ballerina

- Born: 7 February 1949; Guanabacoa, Havana, Cuba
- Died: 29 January 2017 (aged 67); Madrid, Spain
- Occupations: Ballet dancer; prima ballerina
- Years active: 1955–2004
- Spouse: Orlando Salgado

Marta García (7 February 1949 – 29 January 2017) was a Cuban ballet dancer and prima ballerina who worked for the Cuban National Ballet and its corps de ballet. She made her stage debut for the Alicia Alonso Ballet Academy at age seven and trained at Havana's Cuban National Ballet School. García won the 1968 Varna International Ballet Competition youth prize and earned a silver medal at the same event two years later. She was director of the Colon Theater Ballet in Buenos Aires from 2001 to 2004 working with her husband.

== Biography ==
García was born in Guanabacoa, a neighbourhood of Havana, Cuba, on 7 February 1949. At the age of five, she won the Best Children's Artist Award at the Supreme Court of Art contest, giving her access to interpreting Spanish dances on television and appearing on commercials. García made her ballet stage debut for the Alicia Alonso Ballet Academy at the Radiotheatro Center when she was seven years old in 1956. She went on to repeat this performance at The América Theatre the following year and then participated in the Spanish Dance Festival at the Cine-Teatro Fausto. From 1962 to 1965, García trained as a classical dancer at Havana's Cuban National Ballet School, under Alicia Alonso and Alberto Alonso.

Following graduation, she was admitted to the Cuban National Ballet (BNC), and made her debut with the company with the BNC corps de ballet in the ballet Coppélia. García had a minor role performing in the premiere of Díasquefueronnoches in December 1967. She received the youth prize at the Varna International Ballet Competition in Bulgaria in 1968 and performed as a guest of Camagüey Ballet that same year. García went on to earn the silver medal at the 1970 Varna Ballet Competition. The following year, García she performed in the ballet Khachaturian's Masquerade with choreography by Anna Leontieva.

She was promoted to prima ballerina in 1973. García ventured across the globe performing in leading roles in classical repertoire such as La fille mal gardée, Giselle, Swan Lake, Don Quixote and La Bayadère. She premiered in Tenorio's version of The House of Bernarda Alba in 1975 as well as playing the bride La Novia in Antonio Gades' version of Blood Wedding in Havana three years later. That same year, García toured the United States as the lead role of Swanilda in the ballet Coppélia. In 2000, she worked with the Colon Theater Ballet of the Teatro Colón in Buenos Aires and then with multiple institutions in Spain such as the Madrid Joven Ballet de Cámara. García took over as the Colon Theater Ballet's director from 2001 to 2004 working alongside her husband. She later taught at the Alicia Alonso Superior Dance Institute in partnership with the King Juan Carlos University and educated in ballet at the Conservatory of Dance María de Ávila. García published her memoirs in a book whilst residing in Spain in 2014.

== Personal life ==
She was married to her stage partner Orlando Salgado. On the morning of 29 January 2017, García died of lung cancer that she had been suffering from for four years at a hospital in the Spanish capital of Madrid. She was cremated the following day.

== Legacy ==
Roberto Méndez Martínez of Inter Press Service describes García's impact as "not only has gone down in the history of Cuban ballet but also in her non-written legend for the exceptional physical talent which she had the wisdom to restrain and channel to become a great artist and not a circus phenomenon"
