= Loipa Araújo =

Cuban ballet dancer, ballet master, and teacher of ballet

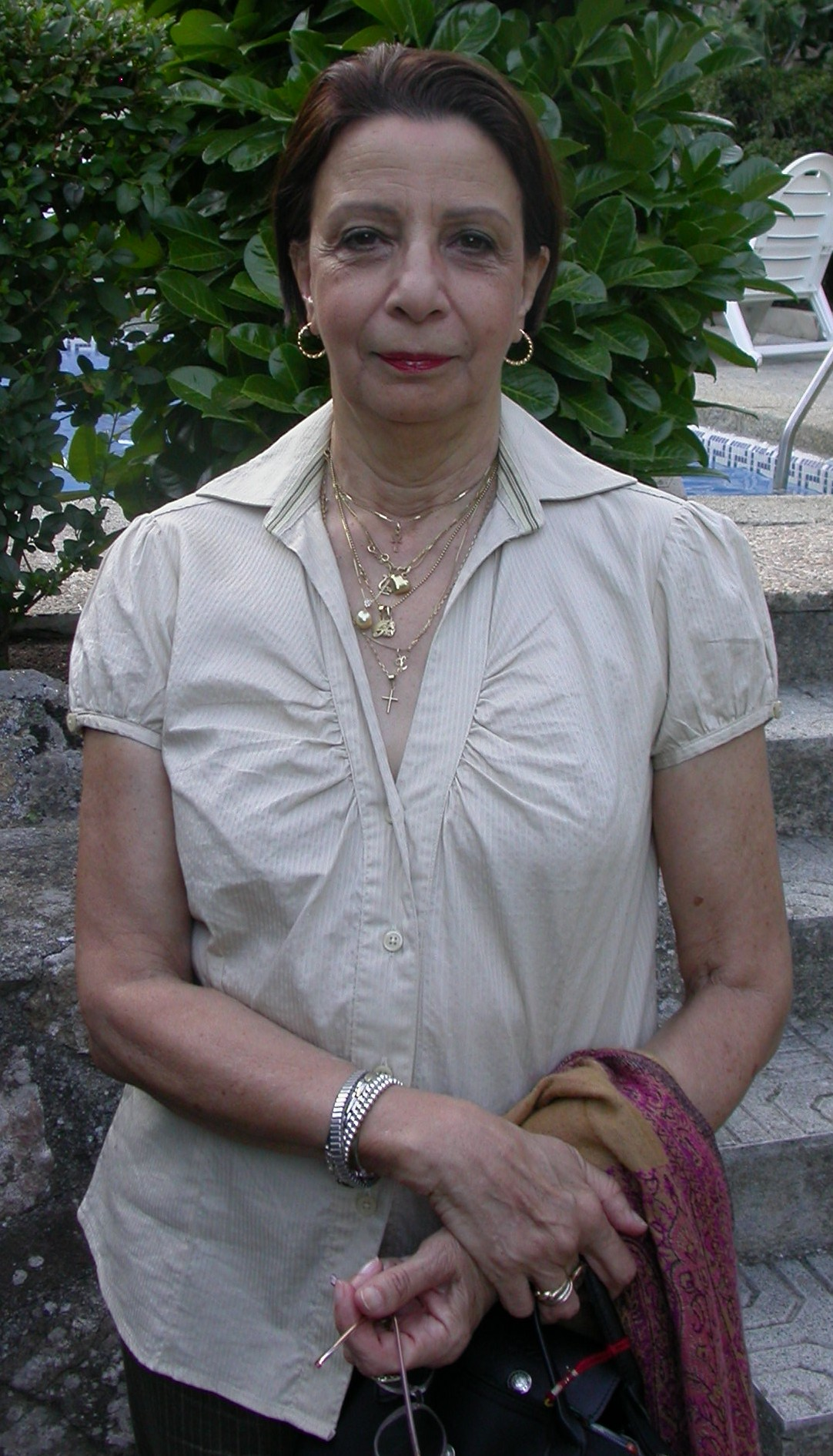
Loipa Araújo

Loipa Araújo (born May 27, 1941) is a Cuban ballet dancer, ballet master, and teacher of ballet. Along with Aurora Bosch, Josefina Méndez, and Mirta Plá, she is regarded as one of the "four jewels of Cuban ballet". Nicknamed the "Cuban muse of Marseille", Araújo is considered to be "one of the best ballet teachers in the world today". She was a principal artist with the Cuban National Ballet (Ballet Nacional de Cuba; BNC).

== Early years ==
Born in Havana in 1941, Araújo's father was Dr. Leopoldo Araujo-Bernal, a psychiatrist. A sister, Nara Araujo-Carruana, and a brother died c. 2008. There are also four siblings from her father side: Dr. Leopoldo Araujo-Pradere, Dr. Eduardo Araujo-Pradere, Ricardo Araujo-Pradere, and Dr. Elsa Araujo-Pradere. She trained at the Ballet School of the Sociedad Pro-Arte Musical de La Habana and at the Alicia Alonso Ballet Academy.

== Career ==
Araújo joined the BNC in 1955 (1959 is also mentioned) and was promoted to principal ballerina in 1965. In 1973, she associated with Ballet National de Marseille where she again held the position of prima ballerina, becoming a muse for Roland Petit. Araújo was a guest performer with the Béjart Ballet, Bolshoi Ballet, Bulgarian National Opera and Ballet, Maly Theatre, and Royal Danish Ballet.

When she was 21 years old, Araújo began teaching at the BNC, transitioning in later years to ballet mistress. Other teaching opportunities occurred at the Béjart Ballet, Bolshoi Ballet, Maggio Musicale Fiorentino, Opéra National de Bordeaux, Paris Opera Ballet, The Royal Ballet, Royal Danish Ballet, Teatro dell'Opera di Roma, Teatro alla Scala, and Teatro di San Carlo. In September 2012, Araújo joined the English National Ballet, where she is the Associate Artistic Director.

Among Araújo's many Cuban honors are the Distinción Por la Cultura Nacional, Medalla Alejo Carpentier, Orden Félix Varela, Premio Annual del Gran Teatro de La Habana, Medalla Fernando Ortiz, Premio Nacional de Danza, Doctora Honoris Causa en Arte, and Member emeritus National Union of Writers and Artists of Cuba. Her international awards include the Gold Medal (Varna, 1965), Silver Medal (Moscow, 1969), and Gold star at the Champs Elysées Ballet Festival (Paris, 1970). She was honored with the Chevalier de la Légion d'Honneur by France in 2011.
