= Zenaida Yanowsky =

Spanish ballet dancer

Zenaida Yanowsky Lady Keenlyside
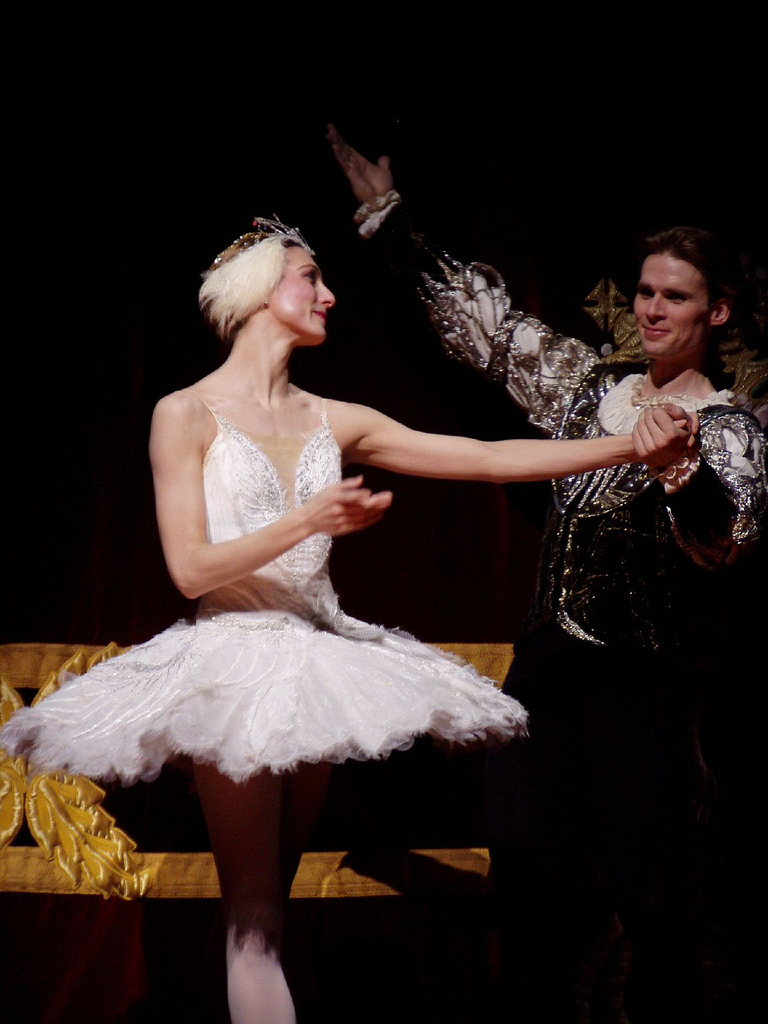
- Zenaida Yanowsky as Odette in a 2007 Royal Ballet production of Swan Lake
- Born: 23 December 1975 (age 50); Lyon, France
- Occupation: Ballet dancer
- Spouse: Sir Simon Keenlyside (m. 2006)
- Children: 2
- Career
- Former groups: Paris Opera Ballet; Royal Ballet

Zenaida Yanowsky, Lady Keenlyside (born 23 December 1975), is a French-born Spanish ballet dancer and a former principal dancer with the Royal Ballet in London.

== Early life ==
Yanowsky was born in Lyon, France, where her parents, Russian ballet dancer Anatol Yanowsky and Spanish ballet dancer Carmen Robles, were both dancers with the Lyon Opera Ballet. She is the sister of former Boston Ballet principal dancer Yury Yanowsky and Royal New Zealand Ballet dancer Nadia Yanowsky. Later, the family settled in Las Palmas, Gran Canaria, where her parents set up a dance school. Although Yanowsky, along with her siblings, took dance classes at her parents' school, it was not until she turned 14 that she decided to become a professional dancer.

== Ballet career ==
After winning the silver medal at the Varna International Ballet Competition in 1991, she received an invitation to audition for the Paris Opera Ballet, and joined the company that year. In 1993 she won the gold medal at the Eurovision Young Dancers Competition and in 1994 the gold medal at the Jackson International Ballet Competition. In the autumn of 1994, having left the Paris Opera Ballet earlier on in the year, she joined the Royal Ballet. She was promoted to the status of Principal Dancer in 2001.

In June 2002 she performed the "Black Swan" pas de deux with Roberto Bolle at Buckingham Palace as part of the 'Prom at the Palace', an event held to celebrate the Golden Jubilee of Elizabeth II.

In 2003, she won the Best Female Dancer award at the Critics' Circle National Dance Awards and in 2005 was voted Dancer of the Year by readers of the magazine Dance Europe.

She retired as a permanent company member at the end of the 2017 season.

=== Career and repertory ===
She has performed many roles in the 19th century classical repertory, including: Odette/Odile in Swan Lake, Lilac Fairy & Carabosse in The Sleeping Beauty, Sugar Plum Fairy in The Nutcracker, Nikiya & Gamzatti in La Bayadère and Myrtha in Giselle. She has also performed in many ballets choreographed by the Royal Ballet's most important choreographers, Sir Frederick Ashton and Sir Kenneth MacMillan. Her Ashton roles include: the title role in Sylvia, Lady Elgar in Enigma Variations, Natalia Petrovna in A Month in the Country, Marguerite in Marguerite and Armand, Josephine in Wedding Bouquet and Monotones II. Her MacMillan roles include: the title role in Manon, Empress Elisabeth in Mayerling, The Chosen One in The Rite of Spring and First Sister in My Brother, My Sisters. She has also performed in many ballets by Balanchine, including the Siren in Prodigal Son, Terpsichore in Apollo, Jewels, Agon, Symphony in C, Serenade, The Four Temperaments and Stravinsky Violin Concerto. Her other roles include the Hostess in Les Biches and the Bride in Les Noces (both choreographed by Bronislava Nijinska) and the Black Queen in Checkmate (by Dame Ninette de Valois).

She has also created roles for and worked with many contemporary choreographers. In the Royal Ballet's 2006/07 season, she created a role in Christopher Wheeldon's DGV: danse a grande vitesse and Anna II in the new production of The Seven Deadly Sins by Will Tuckett. In the 2007/08 season, she worked with Wheeldon again and created a role in Electric Counterpoint. Her role as the maniacal Queen of Hearts in Alice's Adventures in Wonderland by Christopher Wheeldon, drew thunderous applause from both critics and audiences alike and is frequently viewed on YouTube. She created the role of Paulina in Christopher Wheeldon's 2014 ballet The Winter's Tale.

She is featured in the short dance films Duet and the Sandman (directed by the Brothers Quay and Will Tuckett and Choreographed by Will Tuckett for Channel 4). In 2005, she starred in the BBC2's film 'Riot at the Rite' as Maria Plitz, who danced as the Chosen One in the première of The Rite of Spring in 1913 in Paris.

== Personal life ==
She married the British baritone Simon Keenlyside in August 2006. They have two children, a son, Owen, and a daughter, Iona. Her husband was knighted in the 2018 Birthday Honours, granting Yanowsky the title Lady Keenlyside.

== Image gallery ==
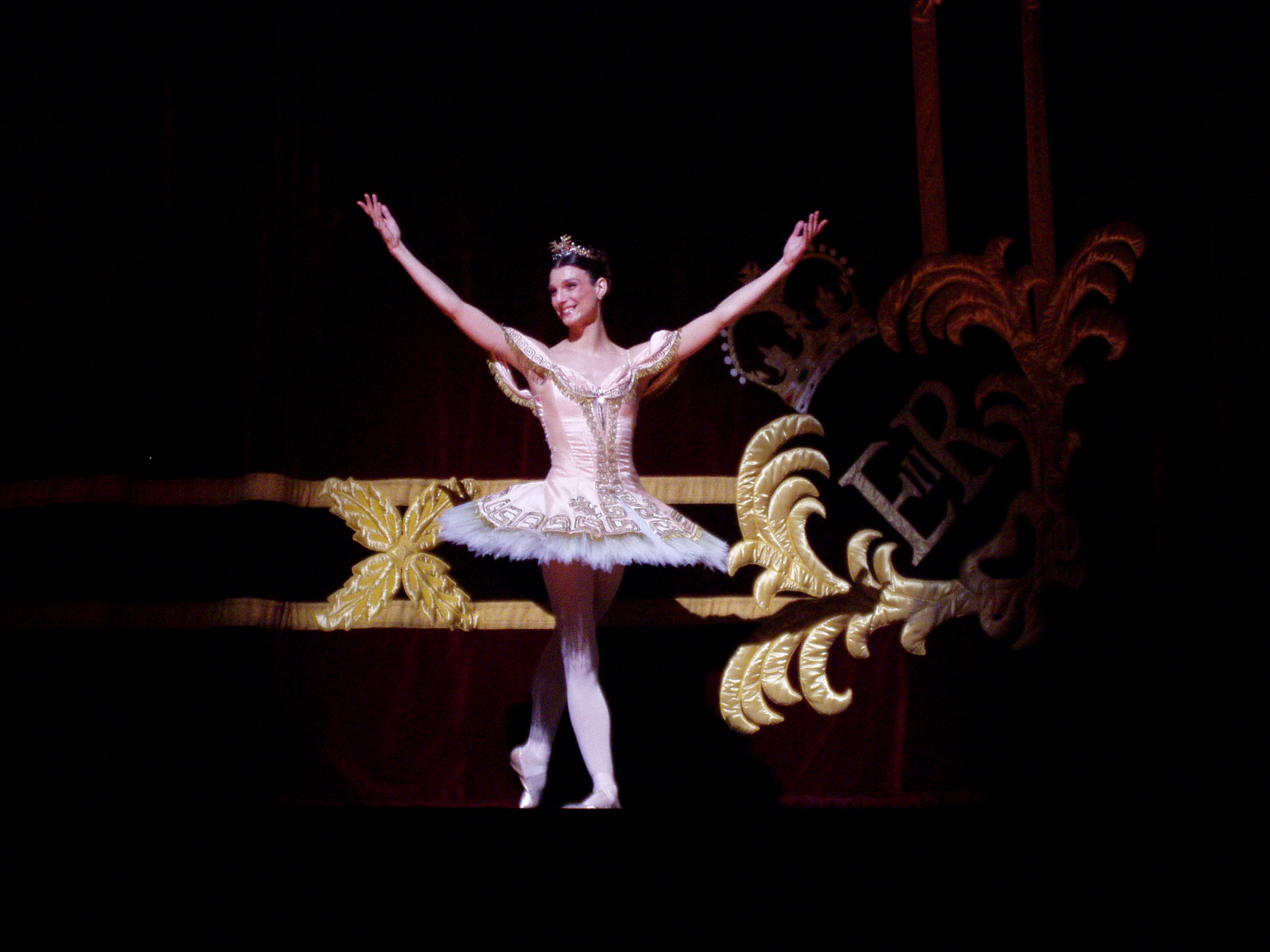
Zenaida Yanowsky as Sylvia in a Royal Ballet production of Sylvia, 7 March 2008.

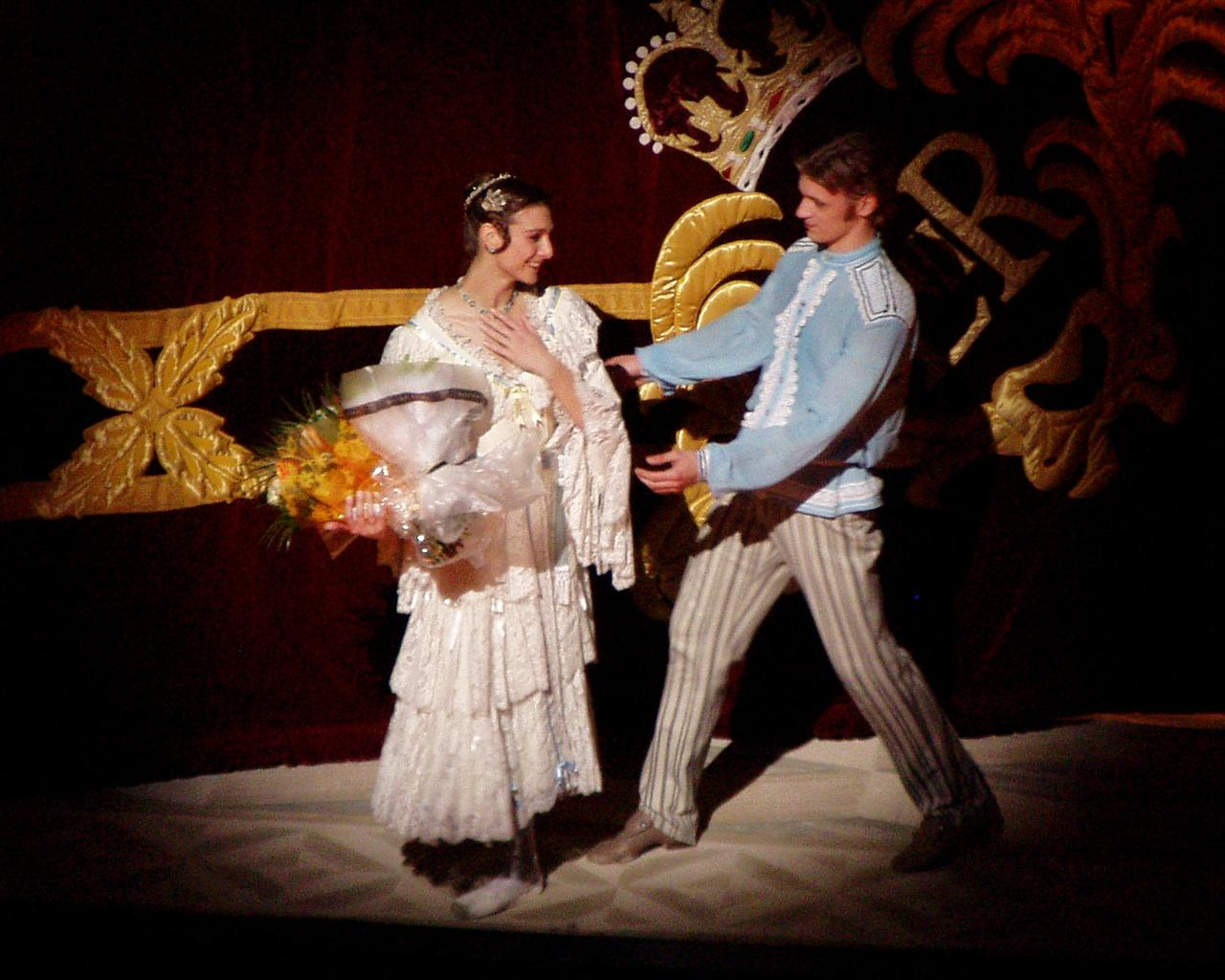
Zenaida Yanowsky as Natalia and Rupert Pennefather as Beliaev in A Month in the Country, performed at the Royal Opera House, 4 March 2008.

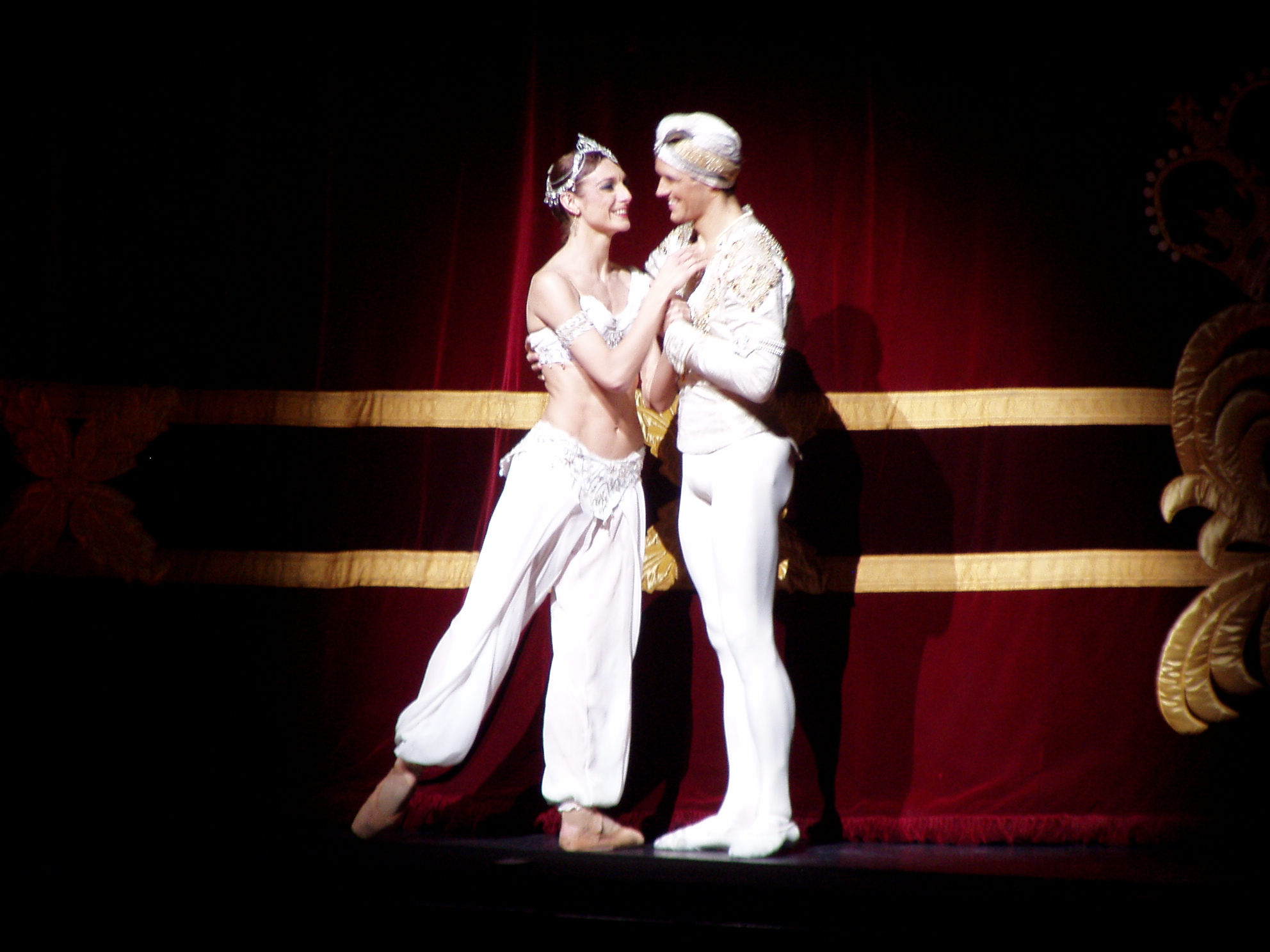
Zenaida Yanowsky and Roberto Bolle as Nikiya and Solor during the red run for the Royal Ballet production of La Bayadere, 20 October 2007.

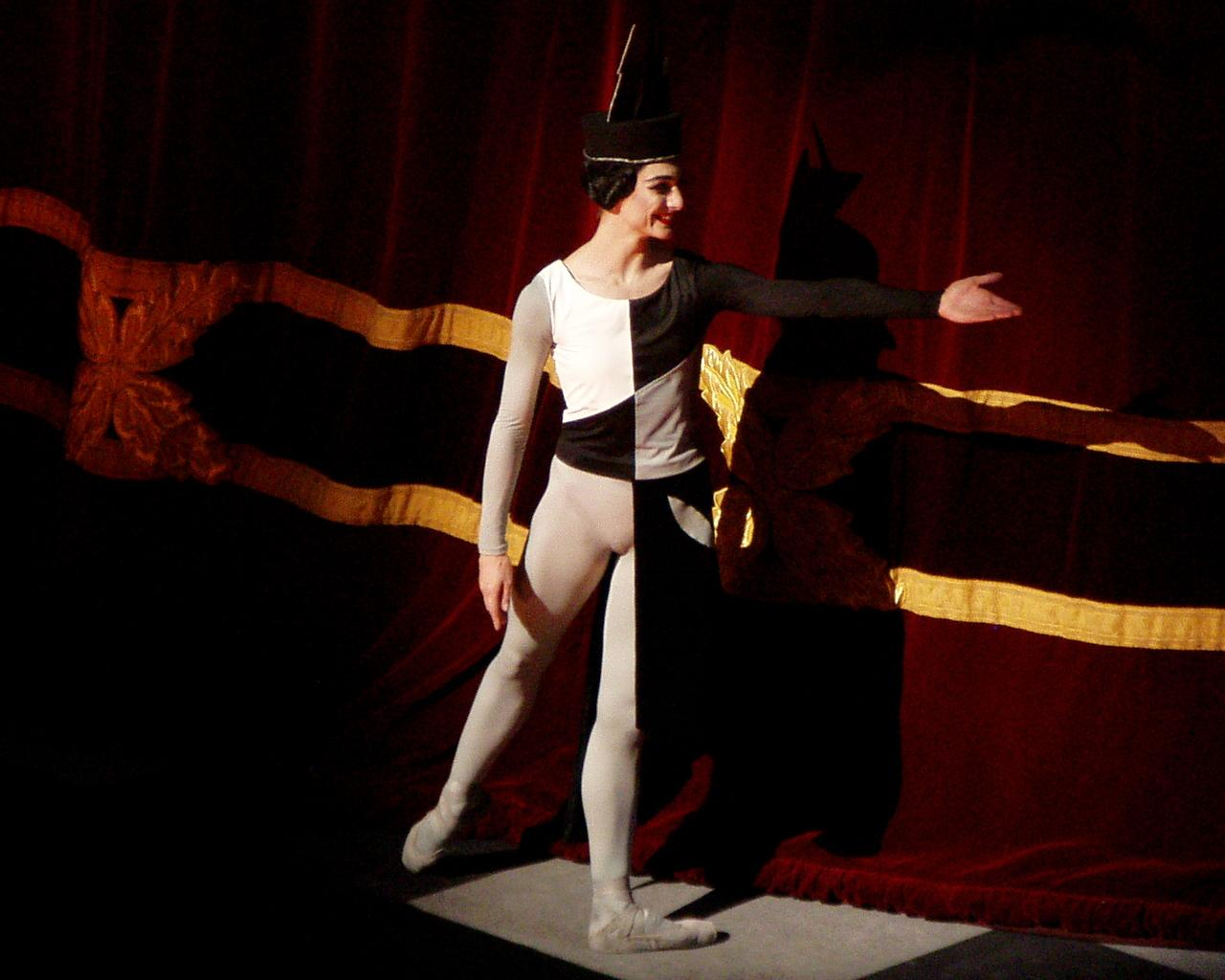
Zenaida Yanowsky as the Black Queen in Checkmate, performed at the Royal Opera House, 8 June 2007.
