= Yosvani Ramos =

Cuban ballet dancer (born 1979)

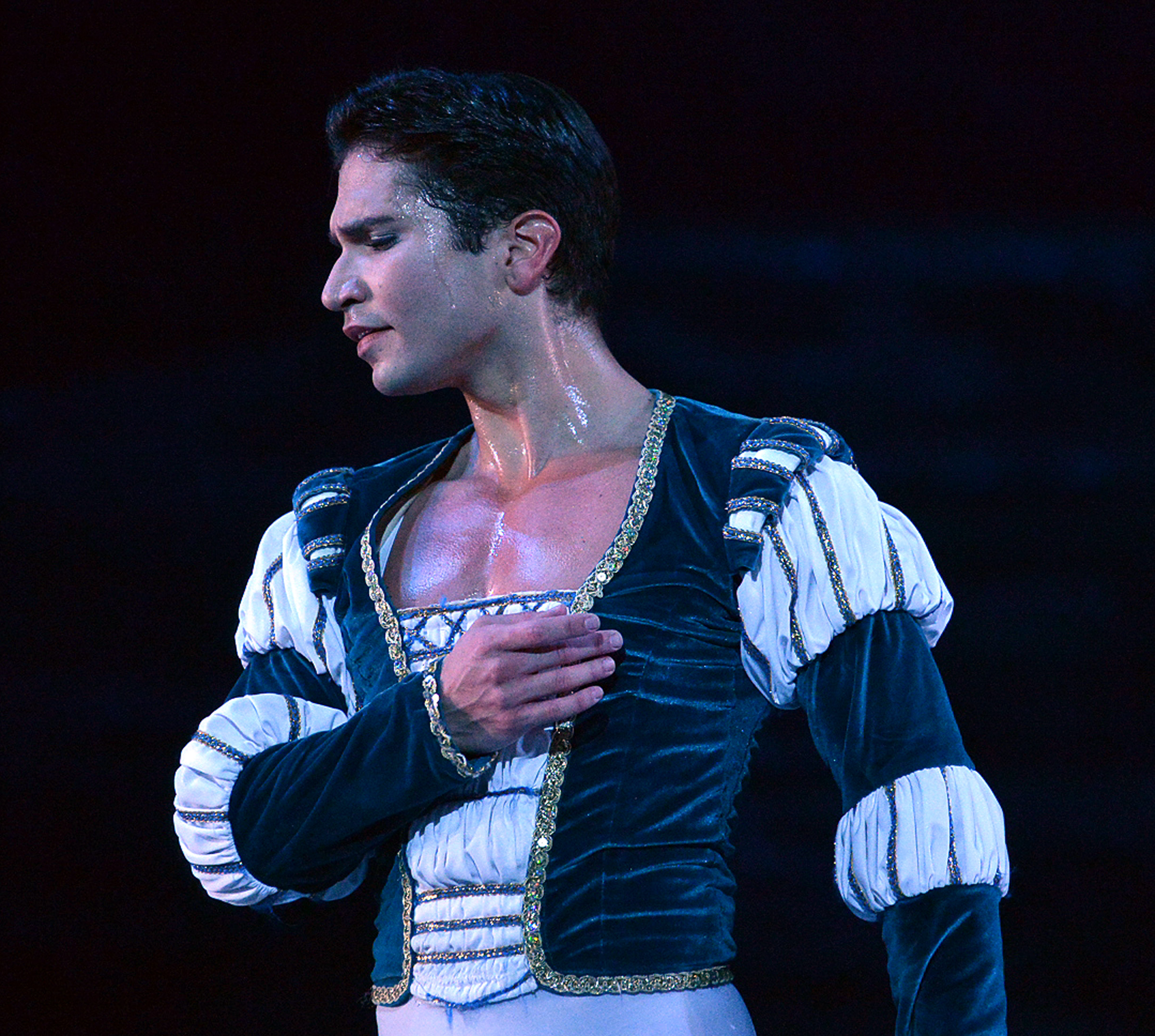
- Yosvani Ramos in Swan Lake, Mexico, April 2012
- Born: 23 June 1979 (age 47); Camagüey, Cuba
- Occupation: Ballet dancer
- Dancing career
- Current group: Ballet de Monterrey
- Former groups: The Australian Ballet; English National Ballet; Paris Opera Ballet; Jeune Ballet de France; Cincinnati Ballet; Colorado Ballet

Yosvani Ramos (born Yosvani Sabdiel Ramos Fontes on 23 June 1979) is a Cuban ballet dancer. He danced with the English National Ballet for nine years, five as a principal dancer, before joining The Australian Ballet as a principal artist in January 2008, leaving in 2013 and dancing with Cincinnati Ballet as a principal dancer for one season. He then joined Colorado Ballet in Denver as a principal dancer, and retired in April 2023. He has been named artistic director of Ballet de Monterrey in Mexico from January 2024.

== Early life and training ==
Ramos was born to Juan Ramos Barba and Gisela Fontes Lopez in Camagüey, Cuba. He studied dance at the Vocational School of Arts there from 1989, and in 1994 won the gold medal at the Vignale Festival of Dance. He was then admitted to study ballet at the Cuban National Ballet School under the direction of Ramona de Sáa, graduating in 1997.

== Professional ballet career ==
In September 1997 Ramos joined the Jeune Ballet de France, a French touring company. Started by Robert Berthier with the assistance of Rosella Hightower, the dancers trained for three months and toured for nine - a Professional Year type of training. Ramos remained with the company for two years, leaving in April 1999 for the Paris Opera Ballet. He performed Nureyev's Swan Lake as a surnuméraire (extra member of the corps de ballet).

Ramos was invited to join English National Ballet as a soloist in August 1999 by Derek Deane, and was promoted to senior soloist in 2000, then principal in 2003 after a performance of Coppélia at the Sadler's Wells Theatre.

The Australian Ballet had only two male principals at the end of 2007, and artistic director David McAllister invited Ramos to join the company as a principal artist from February 2008. He also had many opportunities to perform as a guest artist outside Australia, frequently taking The Australian Ballet's Leanne Stojmenov as his partner. Ramos left The Australian Ballet in April 2013.

After leaving The Australian Ballet, Ramos danced around the world on a freelance basis. He debuted as James in La Sylphide with Bangkok City Ballet in Thailand in July 2013 and also performed at the 18th International Ballet Festival in Miami in September 2013.

He spent the 2014-15 season with Cincinnati Ballet as a principal dancer, then joined Colorado Ballet as a principal dancer for the 2015-16 season.

He remained in Denver for the 2016-17 season, but during rehearsals for "The Nutcracker" in November 2016, tore an Achilles tendon. By June 2017, after surgery and intensive rehabilitation, he was back in the studio, anticipating a return to the stage early in the 2017-18 season. Ramos duly returned to the stage in Dracula in October 2017.

Ten years after leaving English National Ballet, Ramos worked with his former artistic director Derek Deane again, reprising the role of Romeo in Deane's Romeo and Juliet, which Deane set on Colorado Ballet.

In April 2023, he both debuted the title role in George Balanchine's The Prodigal Son and retired as a professional dancer.

In addition to freelancing for a time, Ramos has performed as a guest with companies including Staatstheater Wiesbaden (Germany), HNK Split Ballet (Croatia), Teatro Massimo Vittorio Emanuele (Palermo, Italy), Compañía Nacional de Danza (Mexico), and Ballet de Monterrey (Mexico).

== Awards ==
- 1994 : Gold Medal Vignale Danza in Italy
- 1995 : Grand Prix and Best Couple with Anette Delgado, International Ballet Festival of Havana, Cuba
- 1995 : Gold Medal, Bento Dance, Brazil
- 1995 : Grand Prix, International Ballet Competition, Montevideo, Uruguay
- 1996 : Silver Medal (junior male), Best Couple (junior) with Anette Delgado, Varna International Ballet Competition, Bulgaria
- 1998 : Gold Medal, Joinville Dance Festival, Brazil
- 1998 : Silver Medal (junior male), USA International Ballet Competition, Jackson, Mississippi
- 1998 : Gold Medal (junior male), Paris International Dance Competition
- 1999 : Silver Medal (senior division, classical ballet, male), Nagoya International Ballet Competition, Japan.

== Companies and roles ==
After graduating from the Cuban national school, Ramos toured with the Jeune Ballet de France, both domestically and internationally - Africa, South America, and St Petersburg, Russia. The company performed classical excerpts and commissioned contemporary works. Ramos' roles included pas de deux from La Fille mal Gardée, Harlequinade, Le Corsaire, Flower Festival at Genzano, The Flames of Paris, Stars and Stripes, Don Quixote, and Variations for Four.

As a surnuméraire (short term contract corps de ballet member) with Paris Opera Ballet, Ramos danced in Nureyev's Swan Lake.

=== English National Ballet ===
At the invitation of Derek Deane, Ramos joined English National Ballet as a soloist, eventually being promoted to principal in 2003. Roles with ENB included:

- Franz in Coppélia
- Prince, Nutcracker Doll in The Nutcracker
- Poet in Les Sylphides
- Blue Bird in The Sleeping Beauty
- lead man, Mazurka in Études
- Albrecht, peasant pas de deux in Giselle
- lead man in Balanchine's Who Cares?
- lead man in Balanchine's Square Dance
- Jean de Brienne in grand pas from Raymonda
- pas de deux from Le Corsaire
- Romeo, Mercutio in Nureyev's Romeo and Juliet
- Romeo, Mercutio, Benvolio in Deane's arena Romeo and Juliet
- Siegfried in Swan Lake
- White Rabbit in Alice in Wonderland
- Prince in Cinderella
- Kay (created role) in The Snow Queen
- Drink To Me Only With Thine Eyes (Mark Morris)

=== The Australian Ballet ===
Invited to join the company as a principal, Ramos expanded his repertoire to include

- Prince Siegfried in Graeme Murphy's Swan Lake
- Des Grieux in Macmillan's Manon
- Doctor/Beloved Officer in Graeme Murphy's Nutcracker: The Story of Clara
- Basilio in Gaisina's Don Quixote
- Basilio in Nureyev's Don Quixote
- Prince in Peter Wright's The Nutcracker
- Prince Désiré in Stanton Welch's The Sleeping Beauty
- Camille in Hynd's The Merry Widow
- Mercutio in Murphy's Romeo and Juliet
- Goro in Stanton Welch's Madame Butterfly
- Benno in Stephen Baynes' Swan Lake
- Red Knight in de Valois' Checkmate
- Lead man in Balanchine's Ballet Imperial
- Mazurka in Lifar's Suite en Blanc
- Welch's Divergence
- Petrushka in Fokine's Petrushka
- Principal man in Baynes' Beyond Bach
- Massine's Les Présages
- Macmillan's Concerto (first movement)
- Duato's Por vos muero
- Ratmansky's Scuola di ballo

and continued to dance

- Franz in Coppélia
- Albrecht in Giselle
- The Poet in Les Sylphides

=== May 2013 until August 2014 ===
After his last performance as Basilio in Rudolf Nureyev's Don Quixote with The Australian Ballet on April 24, 2013, Ramos spent some time dancing freelance all over the world.

He made his debut as James in August Bournonville's La Sylphíde with Bangkok City Ballet in Thailand in July 2013, danced Giselle second act pas de deux and Lizzie MacKenzie's Adherence.Process at the International Ballet Festival in Miami, USA in September 2013, guested as the Prince in The Nutcracker with various companies in the USA in December 2013 and performed in ballet galas in London, Cork, Denver and Vienna as well as teaching in England and the USA.

=== Cincinnati Ballet 2014-2015 season ===
- Floating Forward (Heather Britt)
- Peter Pan in Septime Webre's Peter Pan
- Cotton Candy Cavalier, Poodle in The Nutcracker (Victoria Morgan)
- The Joker in ALICE (in Wonderland) (Septime Webre)
- Mozart's Requiem (Adam Hougland)
- Two Soloists in Yuri Possokhov's Classical Symphony

=== Colorado Ballet ===
- Don Quixote pas de deux (Marius Petipa)
- James in Bournonville's La Sylphíde
- Jonathan Harker in Michael Pink's Dracula
- Romeo in Derek Deane's Romeo and Juliet
- Nutcracker Prince and the Sugar Plum Cavalier in Martin Fredmann's The Nutcracker
- Principal couple in his own short ballet Divertimento Pour Six
- The Dodo Bird, the Joker, Lewis Carroll, and the Mad Hatter in ALICE (in Wonderland) (Septime Webre)
- Pas de Six in Dominic Walsh's Wolfgang (for Webb)
- The Devil (El Diablo) in Lorita Travaglia's The Angel of Buenos Aires
- Prince Siegfried and Benno in Swan Lake (Amanda McKerrow and John Gardner after Marius Petipa)
- Prince Désiré in Sleeping Beauty (Petipa)
- Blue couple in Brief Fling (Twyla Tharp)
- Professor Marvel, The Wizard, Guard With Green Whiskers in The Wizard of Oz (Septime Webre)
- Male Dark Angel in Serenade (Balanchine)
- Estuans Interius in Carmina Burana (Fernand Nault)
- Prodigal Son in The Prodigal Son (Balanchine)

=== Television and film performances ===
The Poet in Les Sylphides, included in The Australian Ballet's triple bill Firebird and Other Legends.
