= Funderburk =

Funderburk (German: Vonderburg) or Funderburke is a surname. Notable people with the surname include:

- Brent Funderburk (born 1952), American fine artist
- David Funderburk (born 1944), American diplomat, politician, and writer
- Kody Funderburk (born 1996), American professional baseball pitcher
- Laurie Funderburk (born 1975), American politician from the state of South Carolina
- Lawrence Funderburke (born 1970), American professional basketball player
- Mark Funderburk (born 1957), American baseball player
- Tyrek Funderburk (born 2000), American football player
