= USA International Ballet Competition =

American ballet competition

The USA International Ballet Competition, or USA IBC, is one of the world's top competitions for ballet. Located in Jackson, Mississippi, this competition is attended by dancers from all over the world to represent their country for bronze, silver, or gold medals in a variety of categories of ballet in an Olympic-style competition.

Founded in 1978 by Thalia Mara, the first USA International Ballet Competition took place in 1979. This first competition was given sanction by the United Nations' International Dance Committee of UNESCO's International Theatre Institute.

In 1982, the United States Congress passed a Joint resolution designating Jackson, Mississippi, as the official home of the USA International Ballet Competition. Competitions occur every four years in Olympic style.

== History ==
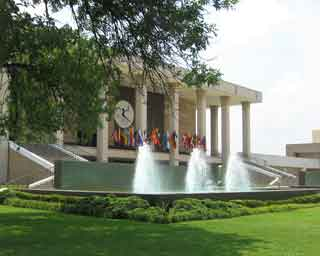
Flags from all participant countries are displayed at Thalia Mara Hall during the 2006 USA IBC

The International Ballet Competition (IBC) originated in Varna, Bulgaria in 1964. The competition eventually expanded to rotating annual events in Varna, Moscow and Tokyo. In 1979 the event first came to the United States in Jackson, Mississippi, where it now returns every four years. The rotation is currently among Jackson, Varna, New York, Helsinki, and Shanghai. A number of other international competitions are also sanctioned by UNESCO International Dance Council.

After a distinguished career as a teacher in New York City, Thalia Mara moved to Jackson, Mississippi, to start a new professional company. That company has transitioned through the years and is now Ballet Mississippi and is under the direction of David Keary. In the late 1970s a group in New York City was looking for a site to hold an international competition in the United States. Thalia Mara successfully lobbied for Jackson as the site because it would give the competitors a taste of Middle America and it would help build interest in the ballet for her struggling new company. When asked why the competition was held in Mississippi, Bruce Marks said "New York is New York but Jackson is America."

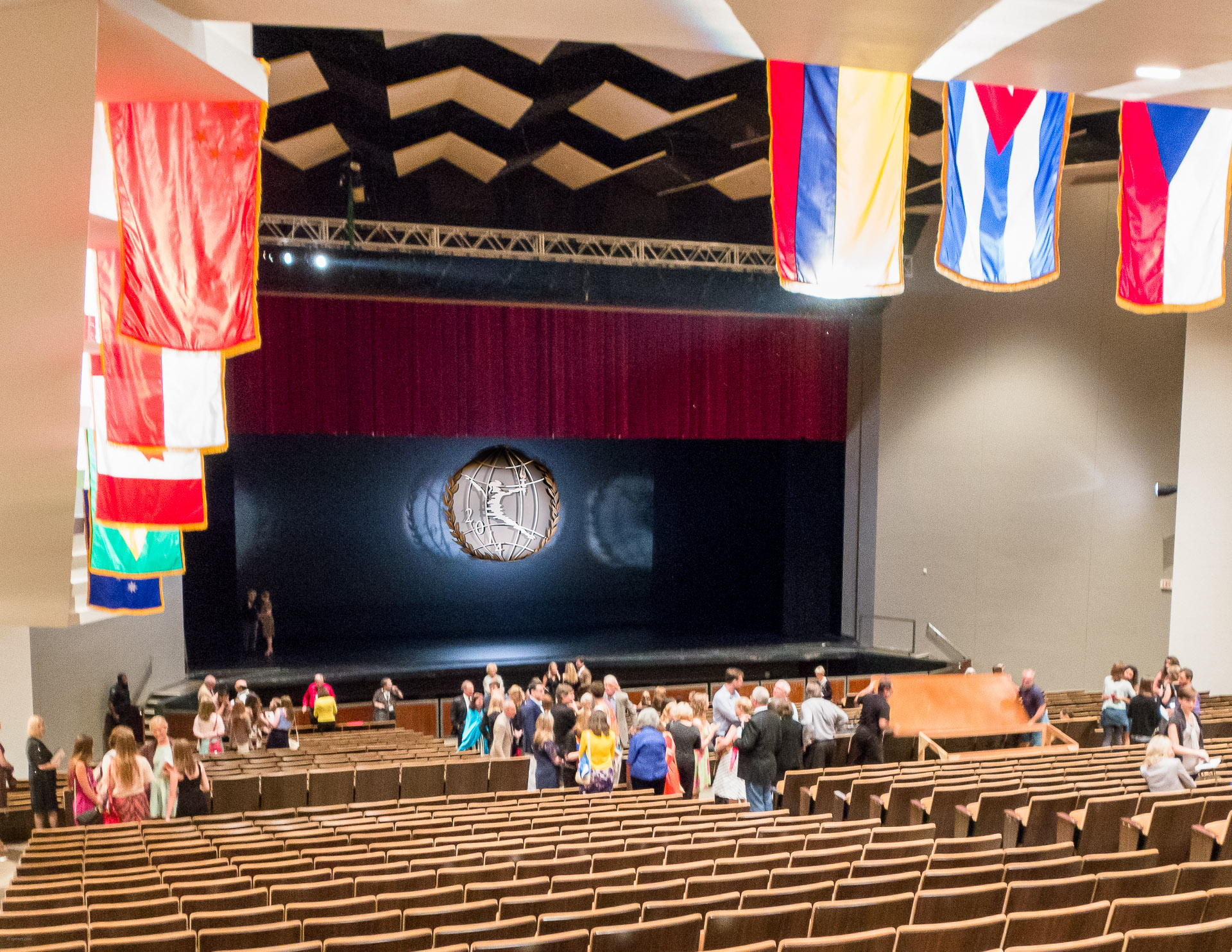
The theater where the USA International Ballet Competition is held every four years.

Ms. Mara put together an organization to raise funds and run the event. Hundreds of local volunteers supplemented the paid staff that first year. Capitalizing on the popularity of local sports the competition was marketed as the Olympics of Ballet. That first competition in 1979 faced an extra hurdle when the Jackson Municipal Auditorium was flooded just months before the competition. The last two weeks of June saw 70 dancers from 15 countries competing in front of several sold-out performances.

After this first event the International Dance Committee of the International Theatre Institute of UNESCO sanctioned the competition. Just before the Second USA IBC in 1982 the United States Congress passed a Joint Resolution designating Jackson as the official home of the IBC.

This first USA IBC added several features that were not found in other competitions. Participants were invited to remain after elimination and encouraged to dance in a special performance at the awards gala. Every competitor and judge was paired with a local host family. A dance school was held concurrently with the competition so students could attend class with world class instructors during the day and attend the competition each night.

In 1994 the performance hall in Jackson, Mississippi where the USA IBC is held was renamed in honor of Thalia Mara. She died in Jackson on October 8, 2003.

== Rules ==
Applicants are required to submit a resume and a video. A selection committee invites about 100 of the applicants to compete as either a junior (15 to 18) or a senior (19 - 26). Accepted competitors are provided a list of classical pieces from which to select their competition performances. Competition is for a gold, silver, and bronze medals for men and women in each of the age categories. Judges do not have to award every medal and sometimes multiple dancers receive a silver or bronze medal. There are additional awards for best couple, The Robert Joffrey Memorial award and awards of encouragement for juniors. A choreography award is given to the best contemporary piece performed in the competition.

The competition consists of three rounds. In the first round each competitor must perform one classical pax de deux or two short solos. At the end of the first round about half of the competitors are selected to continue to the next round. The second round is for contemporary dance. Second round competitors are selected for the final round based on their scores in the first two rounds. In the final round each competitor must perform both a classical or contemporary piece. The medals are determined from the third round scores.

There are thirteen jurors and no country is allowed to have more than one jury member. Jurors score each dancer individually based on artistry, technical skill and musicality. Eliminated competitors are allowed a private session with a jury member to review results.

== Previous participants ==
The USA IBC has accelerated the careers of many dancers including Jose Manuel Carreño (1990), Nina Ananiashvili (1986), Vadim Pisarev (1986), Andris Liepa (1986), Daniel Meja (1986), Rasta Thomas (1998), Vladimir Malakhov (1990), Irina Dvorovenko (1990), Brooklyn Mack 2006, Daniil Simkin (2006), Misa Kuranaga (2006), Sara Webb (2002), Katia Carranza (2002), Anna Antonicheva (1998), Yury & Zenaida Yanowsky (1994), Johan Kobborg (1994), April & Simon Ball (1994), Luis Serrano (1998), Dai Sasaki (1994), Edward Stierle (1986), Li Cunxin (1982) and Katherine Healy (1982).

Jury members have included Robert Joffrey, Yuri Grigorovich, Bruce Marks, Sophia Golovkina, Alexander Grant, Vera Kirova, Ivan Nagy, Laura Alonso, Vladimir Vasiliev, Yvette Chauvrire and Nina Novak.

Li Cunxin (senior men's silver medal in 1982) wrote a memoir Mao's Last Dancer that was a best seller in Australia and the United Kingdom. It includes his account of the competition in Jackson where he was not allowed to compete as a Chinese citizen because of his recent defection to the US. He also discusses the intrigue around the defection of Chinese dancer Lin Jianwei during the competition that year. A movie based on the book was released in 2009. Today Li lives with his family in Melbourne, Australia.

The first gold medalist at a USA IBC was Lubomir Kafka from Czechoslovakia in 1979. The first US representative to win a gold medal was Janie Parker with the Houston Ballet in 1982. The only medalist from the IBC's home town of Jackson was Kathy Thibodeaux in 1982.

Numerous dancers have participated in multiple USA IBCs but only Pierre Quinn from Bluffers Park in Canada has won medals in different IBCs — junior silver in 1982 and senior silver in 1990. Simon Ball came close when he won a Jury award as a junior in 1990 and won the gold medal as a junior in 1994.

A number of brother-sister pairs have been in the competition. The most successful was Yury and Zenaida Yanowsky (Spain, 1994, silver and gold respectively). April and Simon Ball (USA) also won awards as a brother-sister pair that same year.

Notable sisters have also passed through the IBC including Jennifer and Lauren Gelfand (U.S., 1986 and 1990 respectively) and Adrienne and Ashley Canterna (USA, 1998 and 2002). Brothers Zoltan and Tamas Solymosi (Hungary, 1986 and 1990) went on to dance at the Royal Ballet in London and the American Ballet Theatre, respectively. Another pair of brothers were Isaac Hernandez from Mexico who won a Senior Gold medal in 2006 and Esteban Hernandez with a Junior Jury Award of Encouragement in 2010.

The 2010 competition brought us the first father-son participants with Andrei Pisarev of Ukraine who is the son of Vadim Pisarev that won a gold medal for the USSR in 1986.

== 2014 Competition ==
The USA IBC was again held in Jackson, Mississippi, from June 14 to 29, 2014. There were 109 competitors accepted from 21 countries. This year Edward Villella was the jury chairman for the first time and there were two jury members that were previous medalists: Nina Ananiashvili (1986 Senior Grand Prix) and Gigi Hyatt (1982 Junior Gold).

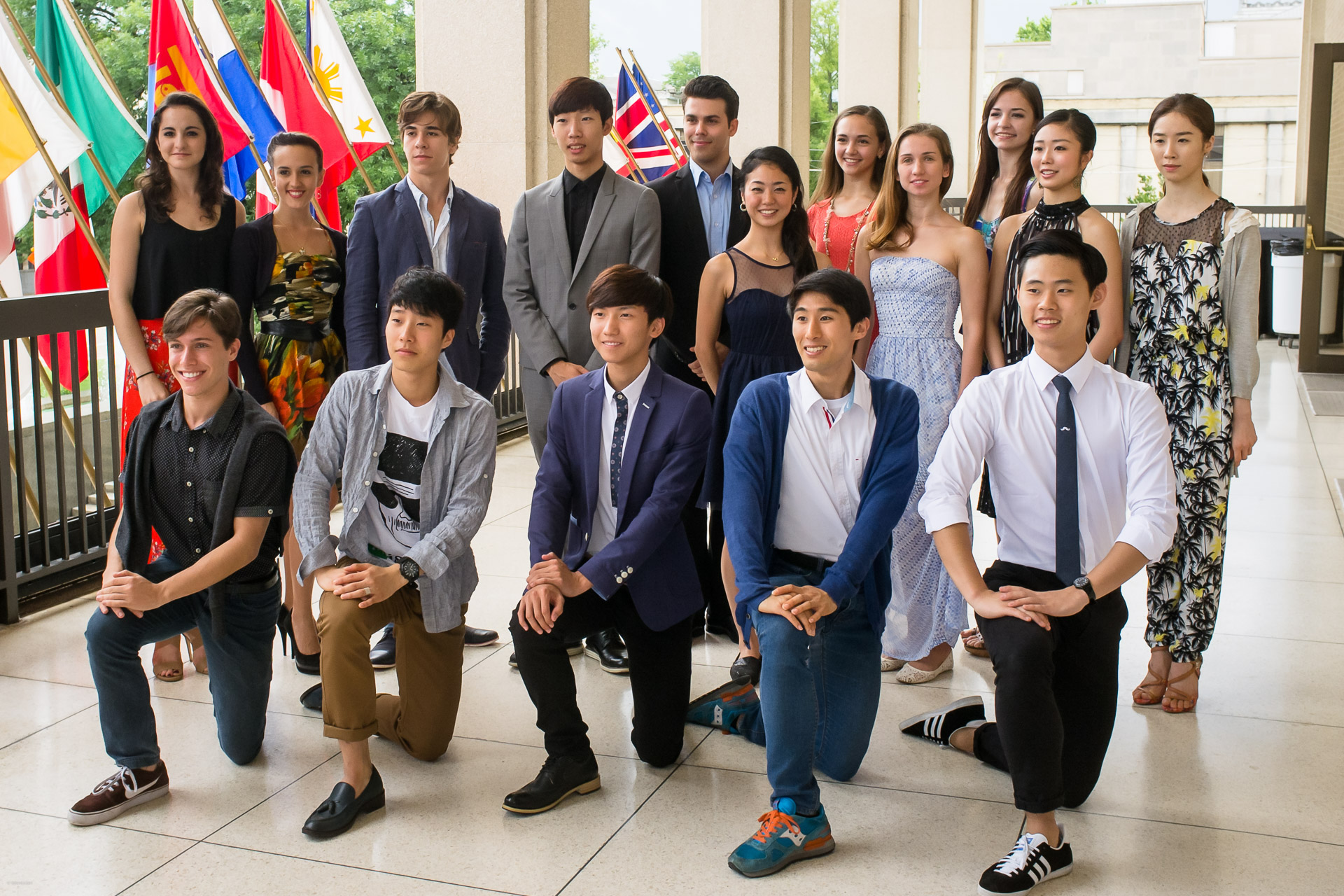

Medalist for the 2014 USA IBC at the press conference Friday morning where the winners were announced. Front row left to right: Ivan Duarte. Jinsol Eum, Taiyu He, Jeong Hansol, Byul Yun. Back row left to right: Paulina Guraieb Abella, Yasmin Lomondo, Gustavo Carvalho, Yui Shi, Aaron Smyth, Tamako Miyazaki, Gisele Bethea, Irina Sapozhnikova, Mackenzie Richter, Shiori Kase, Ga-Yeon Jung.

== 2010 Competition ==
The USA IBC returned to Jackson, Mississippi, from June 12 to 27, 2010. There were over 100 competitors from 36 countries. MSU art professor Brent Funderburk created the poster image for this event.

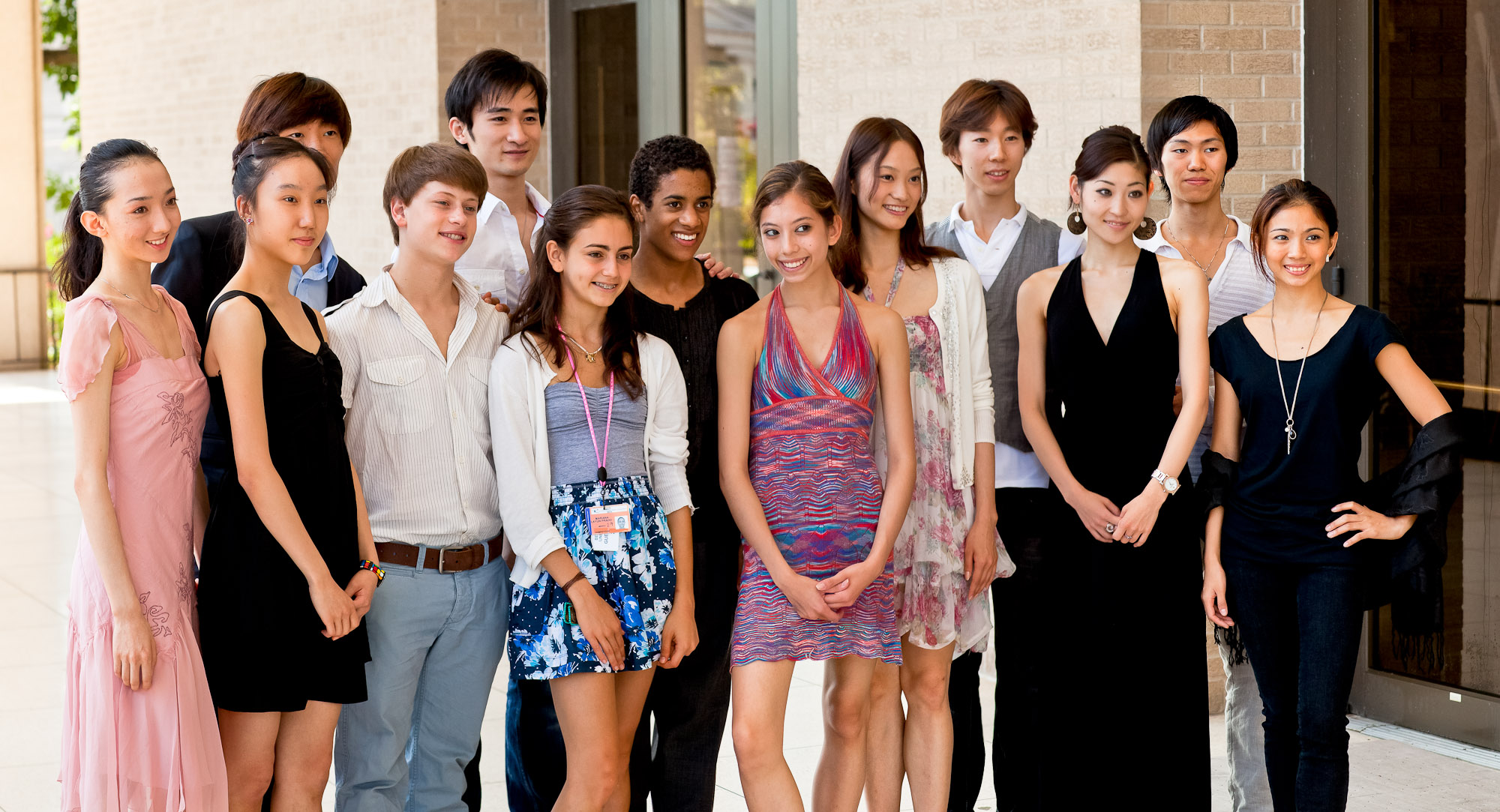

Medalist from the 2010 USA International Ballet Competition in Jackson, Mississippi. This picture was taken at the news conference where the winners were announced on Friday, June 25, 2010. Back row, left to right: Ki-Min Kim (S. Korea, Jr Silver), Zhang Xi (China, Sr Bronze), Marcelino Sambe (Portugal, Jr Gold), Kosuki Okumura (Japan, Sr Silver), Koyhei Yoshida (Japan, Sr Bronze). Front row, left to right: Cao Shuci (China, Sr Gold), Ji-Young Chae (S Korea, Jr Gold), Derek Dunn (USA, Jr Bronze), Mariana Layun Prado (Mexico, Jr Bronze), Alys Sheep (Canada, Jr Silver), Fumi Kaneko (Japan, Jr Silver), Maki Onuki (Japan, Sr Bronze), Candice Adea (Philippines, Sr Silver).

== 2006 Competition ==
The USA IBC returned to Jackson, Mississippi for the eighth time from June 17 to July 2, 2006. There were over 110 dancers from 27 countries in the competition this year.

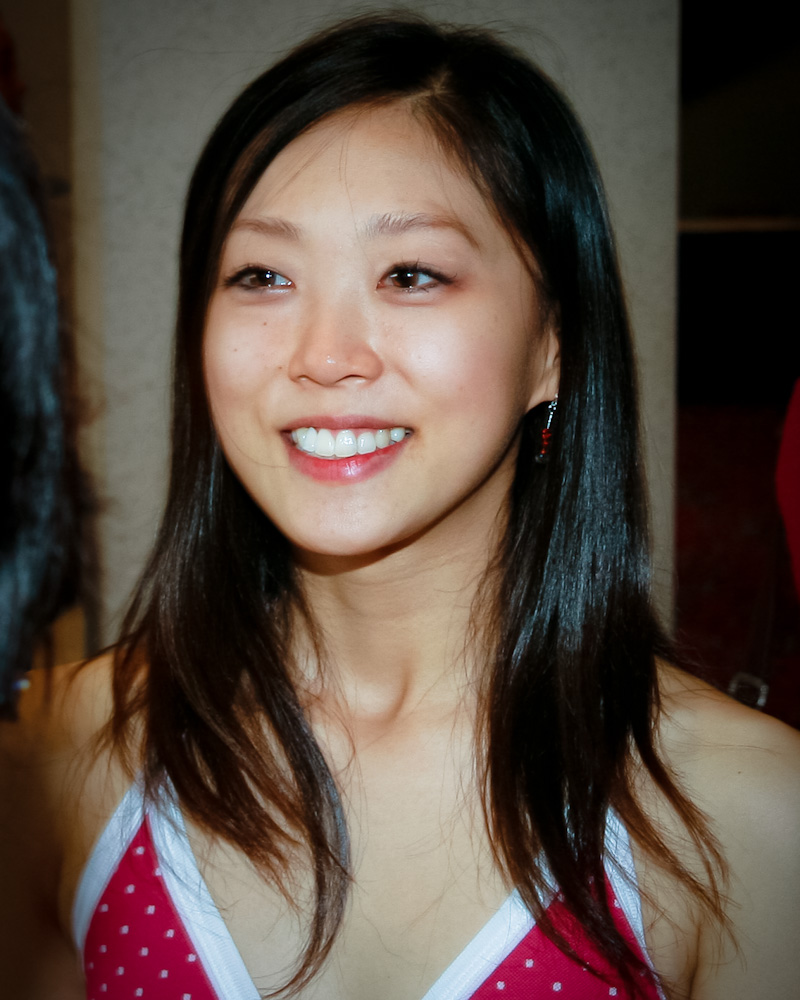
Misa Kuranaga, Senior Gold Medal

Medalist from the 2006 USA International Ballet Competition in Jackson, Mississippi. This picture was taken at the news conference where the winners were announced on Friday, June 30, 2006. Back row, left to right: Mathias Dingman (USA, Jr., best couple), Joseph Gatti (USA, Sr Bronze), Isaac Hernandez (Mexico, Jr Gold), Denys Cherevychko (Ukraine, Sr Silver), Daniil Simkin (Germany, Sr Gold), Brooklyn Mack (USA, Sr Silver), unidentified male, Masayoshi Onuki (Japan, Sr Bronze), Davit Karapetyan. Front row, left to right: Yui Yonezawa (Japan, Sr Bronze), Jurgita Dronina (Lithuania, Sr Silver), Sasha De Sola (USA, Jr., best couple), Misa Kuranaga (Japan, Sr Gold), Kayo Sasabe (Japan, Jr Bronze), Christine Shevchenko (USA, Jr Bronze), Sae-Eun Park (S Korea, Jr Silver), Jeffrey Cirio (USA, Jr Bronze), Vanessa Zahorian.)

== 2002 Competition ==
The USA IBC was again held in Jackson, Mississippi from June 15 to June 30, 2002.

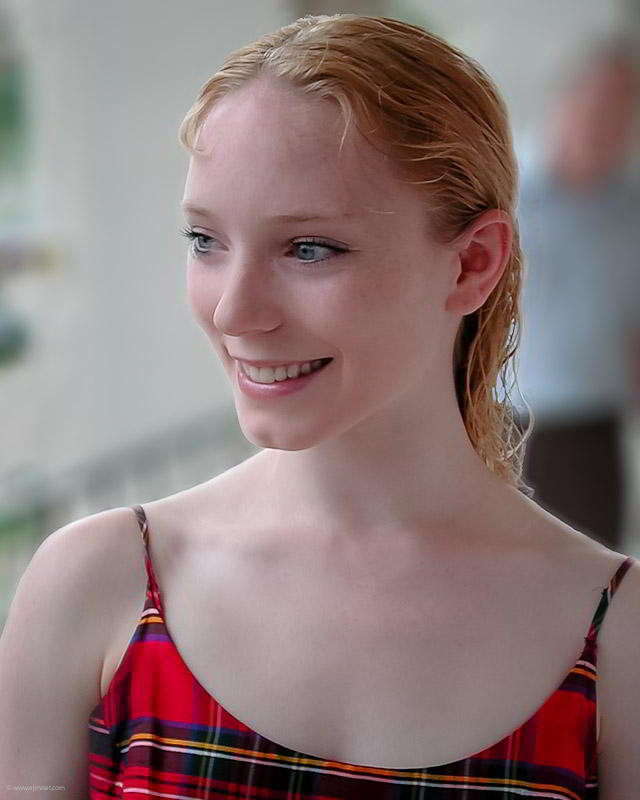
Sarah Lamb, USA, 2002 Silver Medalist

Medalist at the 2002 USA International Ballet Competition. Left to right: Yudai Fukuoka, Japan, Bronze; Sarah Kathryn Lane (light blue shirt), USA, Jr Silver; Katia Carranza (dark blue shirt), Mexico, Bronze; unidentified female (back); Wu Haiyan (white shirt), China, Gold; unidentified male (black shirt); unidentified male (back); Sarah Lamb, USA, Silver; Danny Tidwell, USA, Jr, Silver; Joseph Phillips, Jr Gold; Mikhail Ilyin, Russa, Bronze.

Finalist at the 2002 USA International Ballet Competition. Left to right: Yudai Fukuoka, Japan, Bronze; unidentified female; unidentified female; unidentified female; unidentified male; Ashley Canterna, USA, Jury Award; unidentified female; Emi Hariyama, Japan, Robert Joffrey Award; unidentified female; Sergei Upkin, Estonia, Best Couple; Eve Andre, Estonia, Best Couple.

== USA IBC Award winners ==
Winners' information is from the USA IBC press releases posted on the USA IBC web site. Note that you can click on the symbol in each column heading to sort the table by that column.

| Given Name | Family Name | Country | IBC Yr | J/S | M/F | Medal | Couple | Comment |
|---|---|---|---|---|---|---|---|---|
| Lubomir | Kafka | CZ | 1979 | Sr | M | 2-Gold | best cpl | Berlin Ballet, deceased |
| Koenraad | Onzia | Belgium | 1979 | Jr | M | 2-Gold | | |
| Deirdre | Carberry | USA | 1979 | Jr | F | 3-Silver | | American Ballet Theatre in 1987 |
| David | McNaughton | USA | 1979 | Sr | M | 3-Silver | | choreographer |
| Yanis | Pikieris | Venezuela | 1979 | Sr | | 3-Silver | | Miami Youth Ballet (Director) |
| Jessica | Funt | USA | 1979 | Jr | F | 3-Silver | best cpl | Hamburg Ballet |
| Julian | Montaner | USA | 1979 | Jr | M | 3-Silver | | San Francisco Ballet in 2006, actor, painter |
| Jana | Kurova | CZ | 1979 | Sr | F | 3-Silver | best cpl | Prague Ballet |
| Davide | Bombana | Italy | 1979 | Sr | | 4-Bronze | | Bavarian State Ballet |
| William | Starrett | USA | 1979 | Sr | M | 4-Bronze | | Artistic Director of Columbia City Ballet, SC in 2006 |
| Gregory | Osborne | USA | 1979 | Sr | M | 4-Bronze | | died 1994, cancer |
| Libor | Vaculik | CZ | 1979 | Sr | | 4-Bronze | | National Theatre, Brno, CZ in 2006 |
| Owen | Montague | Canada | 1979 | Jr | M | 4-Bronze | | Quinte Ballet School in 2006 |
| Etsuko | Adachi | Japan | 1979 | Sr | | 4-Bronze | | Tokyo, choreographer |
| Jo Ann | McCarthy | USA | 1979 | Sr | F | 4-Bronze | | Flint's Dance Studio in 2007 |
| Dennis | Marshall | USA | 1979 | Sr | M | 4-Bronze | | Pittsburg Ballet Theatre in 2007 |
| Paola | Cantalupa | Italy | 1979 | Sr | | 4-Bronze | | |
| Gretchen | Newburger | USA | 1979 | Jr | F | 4-Bronze | | Zurich Ballet in 1996 |
| Bronwyn | Thomas-Hodgson | USA | 1979 | Sr | F | 4-Bronze | | Michelle in Fame TV show, Debbie Allen Dance Academy in 2006 |
| Janie | Parker | USA | 1982 | Sr | F | 2-Gold | best cpl | retired Houston Ballet |
| Gina Gail | Hyatt-Mazon | W Germany | 1982 | Jr | F | 2-Gold | | artistic director of Georgia Ballet in 2007 |
| Katherine | Healy | USA | 1982 | Jr | F | 3-Silver | | |
| Li | Cunxin | China | 1982 | Sr | M | 3-Silver | | Australian Ballet, director, author |
| Kathy | Thibodeaux | USA | 1982 | Sr | F | 3-Silver | | Ballet Magnificat] |
| William | Pizzuto | USA | 1982 | Sr | M | 3-Silver | best cpl | New England Ballet in 2006 |
| Alexi | Zubiria | Venezuela | 1982 | Sr | M | 3-Silver | | San Francisco Dance Center in 2006 |
| Pierre | Quinn | Canada | 1982 | Jr | M | 3-Silver | | stagehand in 2006, sailor |
| Pavlo | Savoye | Italy | 1982 | Jr | M | 3-Silver | | |
| Rachel | Beard | USA | 1982 | Sr | F | 4-Bronze | | retired Houston Ballet |
| Carla | Stallings | USA | 1982 | Sr | F | 4-Bronze | | ABT, Boston Ballet, and Severance/Fresno Ballet instructor in 1996 |
| Mami | Inamura | Japan | 1982 | Sr | F | 4-Bronze | | |
| Marek | Stasiewicz | Poland | 1982 | Sr | M | 4-Bronze | | principal with Polish Nat. Opera in 2006 |
| Zhang Wei | Qiang | China | 1982 | Sr | M | 4-Bronze | | |
| Brigitte | Martin | Canada | 1982 | Jr | F | 4-Bronze | | De Rotterdamse Dansacademie/Codarts in 2005 |
| Mark | Lanham | USA | 1982 | Sr | M | 4-Bronze | | California Ballet, San Diego in 1998 |
| Wang | Qifeng | China | 1982 | Jr | F | 7-jury | | Shanghai Ballet in 2003 |
| Nina | Ananiashvili | USSR | 1986 | Sr | F | 1-Grand Prix | | principal with American Ballet Theatre in 2006 |
| Andris | Liepa | USSR | 1986 | Sr | M | 1-Grand Prix | | movie producer/director in 2006 |
| Kiki | Lammersen | W Germany | 1986 | Sr | F | 2-Gold | | Bavarian Nat Ballet in 2004 |
| Jennifer | Gelfand | USA | 1986 | Jr | F | 2-Gold | | Boston Ballet in 2003 |
| Edward | Stierle | USA | 1986 | Jr | M | 2-Gold | | deceased (1991) |
| Vadim | Pisarev | USSR | 1986 | Sr | M | 2-Gold | | Donetsk State Ballet Theatre in 1999 |
| Oliver | Matz | E Germany | 1986 | Sr | M | 2-Gold | | |
| Zoltan | Solymosi | Hungary | 1986 | Jr | M | 3-Silver | | Hungarian Dance Academy in 2006 |
| Bart | De Block | Belgium | 1986 | Jr | M | 3-Silver | | Les Ballets Grandiva in 2006 |
| Sian | Stokes | Australia | 1986 | Sr | F | 3-Silver | | retired from Australian Ballet in 1995 |
| Sarah | Green | USA | 1986 | Sr | F | 4-Bronze | | retired from in 1995 |
| Cristina | Gallardo | Venezuela | 1986 | Jr | F | 4-Bronze | | retired from Teresa Carreño Theatre |
| Frederic | Gafner | Switzerland | 1986 | Jr | M | 4-Bronze | | |
| Jeremy | Ransom | Canada | 1986 | Sr | M | 4-Bronze | | |
| Daniel | Meja | USA | 1986 | Sr | M | 4-Bronze | | |
| Tibor | Kovats | Hungary | 1986 | Sr | M | 4-Bronze | | |
| Henrietta | Muus | Denmark | 1986 | Sr | F | 5-couple | best cpl | |
| Alexander | Kolpin | Denmark | 1986 | Sr | M | 5-couple | best cpl | |
| Helena | Ross | USA | 1986 | Jr | F | 7-jury | | Principal at Los Angeles Classical Ballet, Demi-Soloist at Vienna State Opera Ballet, Teacher/Choreographer at Ballett Ried |
| Jose Manuel | Carreño | Cuba | 1990 | Sr | M | 1-Grand Prix | | Principal at American Ballet Theatre in 2006 |
| Martha | Butler | USA | 1990 | Sr | F | 2-Gold | | Soloist at American Ballet Theatre in 1998 |
| Diana Enid | Perez | USA | 1990 | Jr | F | 2-Gold | | |
| Irina | Dvorovenko | USSR | 1990 | Jr | F | 3-Silver | | dancer at American Ballet Theatre in 2013 |
| Pierre | Quinn | Canada | 1990 | Sr | M | 3-Silver | | |
| Luis | Ortigoza | Argentina | 1990 | Sr | M | 3-Silver | | |
| Simona | Noja | Romania | 1990 | Sr | F | 3-Silver | | |
| Vladimir | Malakhov | USSR | 1990 | Sr | M | 4-Bronze | | Principal at American Ballet Theatre in 2006 |
| Lauren | Gelfand | USA | 1990 | Jr | F | 4-Bronze | | |
| Irma | Nioradze | USSR | 1990 | Sr | F | 4-Bronze | | |
| Irma | Morales | Mexico | 1990 | Sr | F | 4-Bronze | | |
| Morihiro | Iwata | Japan | 1990 | Jr | M | 4-Bronze | | |
| Toomas | Edur | USSR | 1990 | Sr | M | 4-Bronze | best cpl | Principal at English National Ballet (1990-2009), Artistic Director of Ballet at Estonian National Opera (2009-) |
| Age | Oks | USSR | 1990 | Sr | F | 5-couple | best cpl | Principal at English National Ballet (1990-2009) |
| Alice | Lau | Canada | 1990 | Jr | F | 5-couple | best cpl | |
| Boyd | Lau | Canada | 1990 | Jr | M | 5-couple | best cpl | |
| Stephane | Elizabe | France | 1990 | Sr | F | 6-Joffrey | | |
| Lauren | Anderson | USA | 1990 | Sr | F | 7-jury | | Principal at Houston Ballet in 2006 |
| Tamas | Solymosi | Hungary | 1990 | Jr | M | 7-jury | | Hungarian Dance Academy in 2006 |
| Simon | Ball | USA | 1990 | Jr | M | 8-scholarship | | Principal at Houston Ballet in 2003 |
| Elizabeth | Gaither | USA | 1990 | Jr | F | 8-scholarship | | |
| Stephanie | Walz | USA | 1990 | Jr | F | 8-scholarship | | |
| Rennie B. | Mirro | USA | 1990 | Jr | F | 8-scholarship | | |
| Reagan | Messer | USA | 1990 | Jr | M | 8-scholarship | | |
| Katherine | Lydon | USA | 1990 | Jr | F | 8-scholarship | | |
| Johan | Kobborg | Denmark | 1994 | Sr | M | 1-Grand Prix | | principal at Royal Ballet, London in 2005 |
| Simon | Ball | USA | 1994 | Jr | M | 2-Gold | | Principal at Houston Ballet in 2003 |
| Dai | Sasaki | Japan | 1994 | Sr | M | 2-Gold | | independent artist in 2006 |
| Zenaida | Yanowsky | Spain | 1994 | Jr | F | 2-Gold | | Principal at Royal Ballet, London in 2006 |
| Beate | Vollack | Germany | 1994 | Sr | F | 3-Silver | | choreographer at Bayerisches Staatsballett in 2006 |
| April | Ball | USA | 1994 | Jr | F | 3-Silver | | Boston Ballet in 2002 |
| Yury | Yanowsky | Spain | 1994 | Sr | M | 3-Silver | | Principal at Boston Ballet in 2006 |
| Marina | Antonova | Russia | 1994 | Sr | F | 3-Silver | best cpl | Slovene Nat. Theatre Opera in 2006 |
| Kusha | Alexi-Angst | Switzerland | 1994 | Jr | F | 3-Silver | | |
| Igor | Antonov | Ukraine | 1994 | Sr | M | 4-Bronze | best cpl | Richmond Ballet in 2005 |
| Tiekka | Schofield | USA | 1994 | Sr | F | 4-Bronze | | |
| Roman | Rykin | Russia | 1994 | Jr | M | 4-Bronze | | |
| Adela | Pollertova | CZ | 1994 | Jr | F | 4-Bronze | | |
| Ramon | Moreno | Cuba | 1994 | Jr | M | 4-Bronze | | |
| Mariko | Miyauchi | Japan | 1994 | Sr | F | 4-Bronze | | |
| Michal | Matys | CZ | 1994 | Jr | M | 4-Bronze | best cpl | |
| Alexandra | Koltun | USA | 1994 | Sr | F | 4-Bronze | | Ballet San Jose in 2006 |
| Alexander | Pereda | Cuba | 1994 | Sr | M | 6-Joffrey | | |
| Yu | Xin | China | 1994 | Sr | M | 7-jury | | Master teacher at Ballet San Jose School in 2006 |
| Alma | Munteanu | Romania | 1994 | Sr | F | 7-jury | | Grand Theatre de Geneve in 2006 |
| Anna | Dorosh | Ukraine | 1994 | Sr | F | 7-jury | | Instructor at Viva Dance, Toronto in 2006 |
| Wei Ying | Zhang | China | 1994 | Jr | F | 8-scholarship | | |
| Jose Martin | Trujillo | Spain | 1994 | Jr | M | 8-scholarship | | |
| Tamara Marie | House | USA | 1994 | Jr | F | 8-scholarship | | |
| Gillian | Murphy | USA | 1994 | Jr | F | 9-finalist | | principal at American Ballet Theatre in 2006 |
| Rasta | Thomas | USA | 1998 | Sr | M | 2-Gold | | Bad Boys of Dance in 2009 |
| Rolando Sarabia | Oquendo | Cuba | 1998 | Jr | M | 2-Gold | | Ballet National de Cuba |
| Anna | Antonicheva | Russia | 1998 | Sr | F | 2-Gold | | Bolshoi Ballet in 2006 |
| Adrienne | Canterna | USA | 1998 | Jr | F | 2-Gold | | Bad Boys of Dance in 2009 |
| Dmitri | Belogolovtsev | Russia | 1998 | Sr | M | 3-Silver | | Bolshoi Ballet in 2005 |
| Ruta | Jezerskyte | Lithuania | 1998 | Sr | M | 3-Silver | | Steps on Broadway in 2006 |
| Yosvani Ramos | Fontes | Cuba | 1998 | Jr | M | 3-Silver | | English National Ballet 1999–2008, The Australian Ballet 2008-13 |
| Bernard Courtot | de Bouteiller | France | 1998 | Sr | M | 3-Silver | | |
| Renata Pavam | Maia | Brazil | 1998 | Jr | F | 3-Silver | | American Ballet Theatre, Corps de Ballet - Professional Photographer |
| Luis | Serrano | Cuba | 1998 | Sr | M | 4-Bronze | | Principal at Miami City Ballet in 2006 |
| Melissa | Wishinski | USA | 1998 | Jr | F | 4-Bronze | | The Royal Ballet, London |
| Friedemann | Vogel | Germany | 1998 | Jr | M | 4-Bronze | | principal at Stuttgart Ballet in 2006 |
| Julia | Polgorodnik | Ukraine | 1998 | Jr | F | 4-Bronze | | |
| Yusuke | Osozawa | Japan | 1998 | Jr | M | 4-Bronze | | |
| Ji Young | Kim | S Korea | 1998 | Sr | F | 4-Bronze | | Principal at Korean National Ballet, Korea in 2006 |
| Lénaïg | Guégan | France | 1998 | Sr | F | 6-Joffrey | | English National Ballet |
| Nao | Sakuma | Japan | 1998 | Sr | F | 7-jury | | Principal at Birmingham Royal Ballet in 2006 |
| Felipe Diaz | Gomez | Colombia | 1998 | Jr | M | 7-jury | | |
| Maria | Bystrova | USA | 1998 | Jr | F | 8-scholarship | | American Ballet Theatre in 2006 |
| Shingo | Yoshimoto | Japan | 1998 | | M | 8-scholarship | | Soloist at Houston Ballet in 2006 |
| Joseph | Phillips | USA | 2002 | Jr | M | 2-Gold | | Principal at Miami City Ballet in 2007 |
| Wu | Haiyan | China | 2002 | Sr | F | 2-Gold | | Principal at Miami City Ballet in 2007 |
| Sarah | Lamb | USA | 2002 | Sr | F | 3-Silver | | Principal at The Royal Ballet in 2003 |
| Danny | Tidwell | USA | 2002 | Jr | M | 3-Silver | | Bad Boys of Dance in 2009 |
| Li | Jun | China | 2002 | Sr | M | 3-Silver | | principal at National Ballet of China in 2005 |
| Sarah Kathryn | Lane | USA | 2002 | Jr | F | 3-Silver | | Soloist at American Ballet Theatre in 2007; stand in for Natalie Portman in Black Swan (film) |
| Yang | Jiao | China | 2002 | Jr | M | 4-Bronze | | Principal at Liaoning Ballet in 2006 |
| Mikhail | Ilyin | Russia | 2002 | Sr | M | 4-Bronze | | |
| Katia | Carranza | Mexico | 2002 | Sr | F | 4-Bronze | | Guest artist at Miami City Ballet in 2009 |
| Sang Yi | Han | S Korea | 2002 | Jr | F | 4-Bronze | | Soloist at Universal Ballet, Korea in 2011 |
| Yudai | Fukuoka | Japan | 2002 | Jr | M | 4-Bronze | | Zurich Ballet in 2006 |
| Eve | Andre | Estonia | 2002 | Sr | F | 5-couple | best cpl | First soloist at Estonian National Opera in 2006 |
| Sergei | Upkin | Estonia | 2002 | Sr | M | 5-couple | best cpl | Estonian National Opera in 2003 |
| Emi | Hariyama | Japan | 2002 | Sr | F | 6-Joffrey | | Berlin Staatsopera in 2003 |
| Ashley | Canterna | USA | 2002 | Jr | F | 7-jury | | |
| Melissa | Hough | USA | 2002 | Jr | F | 7-jury | | Boston Ballet in 2006 |
| Agnieszka | Szymanska | Poland | 2002 | Sr | F | 7-jury | | Miami City Ballet in 2006 |
| Troy | Schumacher | USA | 2002 | Jr | M | 7-jury | | New York City Ballet in 2006 |
| Zhang | Jing | China | 2002 | Jr | F | 8-scholarship | | Ballet San Jose in 2006 |
| Keigo | Fukuda | Japan | 2002 | Jr | M | 8-scholarship | | |
| Michelle | Carpenter | USA | 2002 | Jr | F | 8-scholarship | | |
| Eun Ji | Ha | S Korea | 2002 | Jr | F | 8-scholarship | | Principal at Finland National Ballet in 2008 |
| Sara | Webb | USA | 2002 | Sr | F | 9-finalist | | principal at Houston Ballet in 2006 |
| Misa | Kuranaga | Japan | 2006 | Sr | F | 2-Gold | | Principal at San Francisco Ballet in 2019 |
| Daniil | Simkin | Germany | 2006 | Sr | M | 2-Gold | | Soloist at American Ballet Theatre in 2009 |
| Isaac | Hernandez | Mexico | 2006 | Jr | M | 2-Gold | | FONCA, México; The Rock School for Dance Education en Filadelfia, E.E.U.U. y del American Ballet Theatre. |
| Brooklyn | Mack | USA | 2006 | Sr | M | 3-Silver | | Washington Ballet in 2008 |
| Jurgita | Dronina | Lithuania | 2006 | Sr | F | 3-Silver | | Swedish Royal Ballet in 2006 |
| Denys | Cherevychko | Ukraine | 2006 | Jr | M | 3-Silver | | |
| Sae-eun | Park | S Korea | 2006 | Jr | F | 3-Silver | | Paris Opera Ballet in 2011 |
| Masayoshi | Onuki | Japan | 2006 | Sr | M | 4-Bronze | | |
| Yui | Yonezawa | Japan | 2006 | Sr | F | 4-Bronze | | Ballet San Jose |
| Joseph | Gatti | USA | 2006 | Sr | M | 4-Bronze | | Soloist at Cincinnati Ballet in 2005 |
| Jeffrey | Cirio | USA | 2006 | Jr | M | 4-Bronze | | |
| Christine | Shevchenko | USA | 2006 | Jr | F | 4-Bronze | | Principal at American Ballet Theatre Studio Company in 2006 |
| Kayo | Sasabe | Japan | 2006 | Jr | F | 4-Bronze | | |
| Davit | Karapetyan | Armenia | 2006 | Sr | M | 5-couple | best cpl | Principal at San Francisco Ballet in 2006 |
| Mathias | Dingman | USA | 2006 | Jr | M | 5-couple | best cpl | |
| Sasha | De Sola | USA | 2006 | Jr | F | 5-couple | best cpl | Principal at San Francisco Ballet in 2017 |
| Vanessa | Zahorian | NCP | 2006 | NCP | F | 5-couple | best cpl | San Francisco Ballet in 2006 |
| Marija | Kicevska | Macedonia | 2006 | Sr | F | 6-Joffrey | | Volksoper Wien, Vienna |
| Caitlin | Valentine | USA | 2006 | Sr | F | 7-jury | | Orlando Ballet |
| Francesca | Dugarte | Venezuela | 2006 | Jr | F | 7-jury | | The Washington Ballet |
| Zherlin | Ndudi | Ukraine | 2006 | Sr | M | 7-jury | | |
| Ryo | Izawa | Japan | 2006 | Jr | M | 7-jury | | Reiko Yamamoto Ballet School, Ota, Japon |
| Amy Marie | Briones | USA | 2006 | Jr | F | 8-scholarship | | Ballet San Jose in 2006 |
| Carolyn Rose | Ramsay | Canada | 2006 | Sr | F | 8-scholarship | | Miami City Ballet in 2006 |
| Toshiro | Muraoka-Abbley | USA | 2006 | Jr | M | 8-scholarship | | |
| Elena | Kazakova | Russia | 2006 | Jr | F | 8-scholarship | | |
| Randy | Herrera | USA | 2006 | Sr | M | 9-finalist | | Houston Ballet in 2006 |
| Natalia | Domracheva | Russia | 2006 | Sr | F | 9-finalist | | Kyiv National Opera Ballet in 2007 |
| Ji A | Kim | S Korea | 2006 | Jr | F | 9-injury | | Donetsk National Ballet Theatre in 2012 |
| Cao | Shuci | China | 2010 | Sr | F | 2-Gold | best cpl | National Ballet of China in 2010 |
| Candice | Adea | Philippines | 2010 | Sr | F | 3-Silver | | Hong Kong Ballet in 2012] |
| Kosuke | Okumura | Japan | 2010 | Sr | M | 3-Silver | | Principal at Jinushi Kaoru Ballet in 2010 |
| Kyohei | Yoshida | Japan | 2010 | Sr | M | 4-Bronze | | Soloist at Slovak National Theatre Ballet in 2010 |
| Zhang | Xi | China | 2010 | Sr | M | 4-Bronze | best cpl | National Ballet of China in 2010 |
| Maki | [Onuki | Japan | 2010 | Sr | F | 4-Bronze | | Washington Ballet |
| Marcelino | Sambe | Portugal | 2010 | Jr | M | 2-Gold | | The Royal Ballet, 2013 |
| Ji Young | Chae | S Korea | 2010 | Jr | F | 2-Gold | best cpl | Washington Ballet |
| Ki-Min | Kim | S Korea | 2010 | Jr | M | 3-Silver | best cpl | First Soloists at Marinsky Ballet Company in 2013 |
| Fumi | Kaneko | Japan | 2010 | Jr | F | 3-Silver | | Soloist at The Royal Ballet, 2013 |
| Alys | Shee | Canada | 2010 | Jr | F | 3-Silver | | Birmingham Royal Ballet, 2012 |
| Derek | Dunn | USA | 2010 | Jr | M | 4-Bronze | | Houston Ballet, 2012 |
| Mariana Layun | Prado | Mexico | 2010 | Jr | F | 4-Bronze | | John Cranko Schule, Stuttgart, Germany, 2014 |
| Guixien | Chu | Taiwan | 2010 | Sr | M | 6-Capezio | | Ballet West in 2010 |
| Exaterina | Oleynik | Belarus | 2010 | Sr | F | 6-Capezio | | Miami City Ballet in 2010 |
| Seo-Hye | Han | S Korea | 2010 | Sr | F | 6-Joffrey | | Second Soloist Boston Ballet, 2012 |
| Esteban | Hernandez | Mexico | 2010 | Jr | M | 7-Jury | | San Francisco Ballet, 2013 |
| Amanda | Gomes | Brazil | 2010 | Jr | F | 7-Jury | | |
| Andrei | Pisarev | Ukraine | 2010 | Sr | M | 9-finalist | | |
| Gisele | Bethea | USA | 2014 | Jr | F | 2-Gold | | American Ballet Theatre Corp member |
| Taiyu | He | China | 2014 | Jr | M | 2-Gold | | |
| Jeong | Hansol | S Korea | 2014 | Sr | M | 2-Gold | | |
| Shiori | Kase | Japan | 2014 | Sr | F | 2-Gold | | English National Ballet |
| Jinsol | Eum | S Korea | 2014 | Jr | M | 3-Silver | | |
| Tamako | Miyazaki | Japan | 2014 | Sr | F | 3-Silver | | Washington Ballet |
| Mackenzie | Richter | USA | 2014 | Jr | F | 3-Silver | | Houston Ballet II |
| Irina | Sapozhnikova | Russia | 2014 | Sr | F | 3-Silver | | Principal at Primorsky Opera Ballet |
| Byul | Yun | S Korea | 2014 | Sr | M | 3-Silver | | Korea Nat U of Arts |
| Paulia Guraieb | Abella | Mexico | 2014 | Jr | F | 4-Bronze | | |
| Gustavo | Carvalho | Brazil | 2014 | Jr | M | 4-Bronze | best cpl | Soloist at Cia Brasileira de Ballet |
| Ivan | Duarte | Brazil | 2014 | Sr | M | 4-Bronze | | Petite Danse, Rio |
| Ga-Yeon | Jung | S Korea | 2014 | Sr | F | 4-Bronze | best cpl | |
| Yasmin | Lomondo | Brazil | 2014 | Jr | F | 4-Bronze | best cpl | Soloist at Compahina Brasileira de Ballet |
| Aaron | Smyth | Australia | 2014 | Sr | M | 4-Bronze | | Joffrey Ballet |
| Daniel Alejandro | McCormick-Quintero | Mexico | 2014 | Jr | M | 6-Joffrey | | San Francisco Ballet School |
| Romina | Contreras | Chile | 2014 | Jr | F | 7-jury | | Ballet de Santiago |
| Yue | Shi | China | 2014 | Jr | M | 7-jury | | |
| Ji Seok | Ha | S Korea | 2014 | Sr | M | best cpl | best cpl | |
| Sicong | Wu | China | 2018 | Sr | M | Gold | | |
| Hunting | Qiu | China | 2018 | Sr | F | Gold | | |
| Sangmin | Lee | Republic of Korea | 2018 | Sr | M | Silver | Best couple | |
| Soobin | Lee | Republic of Korea | 2018 | Sr | F | Silver | Best couple | |
| Katherine | Barkman | USA | 2018 | Sr | F | Silver | | |
| David | Schrenk | USA | 2018 | Sr | M | Bronze | | |
| Chisako | Oga | USA | 2018 | Sr | F | Bronze | | |
| Elisabeth | Beyer | USA | 2018 | JR | F | Gold | | |
| Hyuma | Kiyosawa | Japan | 2018 | JR | M | Silver | | |
| Julia | Rust | USA | 2018 | JR | F | Silver | | |
| Carolyne | Galvao | Brazil | 2018 | JR | F | Silver | | |
| Harold | Mendez | USA | 2018 | JR | M | Bronze | | |
| Joseph | Markey | USA | 2018 | JR | M | Bronze | | |
| Tia | Wenkman | USA | 2018 | JR | F | Bronze | | |
| Rheya | Shano | USA | 2018 | JR | F | Bronze | | |
| Ryo | Sasaki | Japan | 2023 | SR | M | Gold | Best couple | |
| Sayako | Toku | Japan | 2023 | SR | F | Gold | Best couple | |
| Chongzheng | Guan | China | 2023 | SR | M | Silver | | |
| Xinyue | Zhao | China | 2023 | SR | F | Silver | | |
| Yuval | Cohen | Israel | 2023 | SR | M | Bronze | | |
| Yunju | Lee | Republic of Korea | 2023 | SR | F | Bronze | | |
| Alexie | Orohovsky | USA | 2023 | JR | M | Gold | | |
| Mengxuan | Yan | China | 2023 | JR | F | Gold | Best couple | |
| Kangwon | Lee | Republic of Korea | 2023 | JR | M | Silver | | |
| Zihan | Kong | China | 2023 | JR | M | Bronze | Best couple | |
| Julie | Joyner | USA | 2023 | JR | F | Bronze | | |

Table Notes:

- J/S = Junior (15-18) or Senior (19-26). NCP = Non-competing partner
- M/F = Male or Female
- Couple = won the best junior or senior couple award
- Many of the links to the dancer's companies are no longer on-line. The comments reflect information available at the date indicated.

== See also ==
- International Ballet Competition (disambiguation)
- Aspendos International Opera and Ballet Festival
- Canadian Ballet Festival
- International Ballet Festival of Havana
