= Jurgita Dronina =

Lithuanian ballet dancer (born 1986)

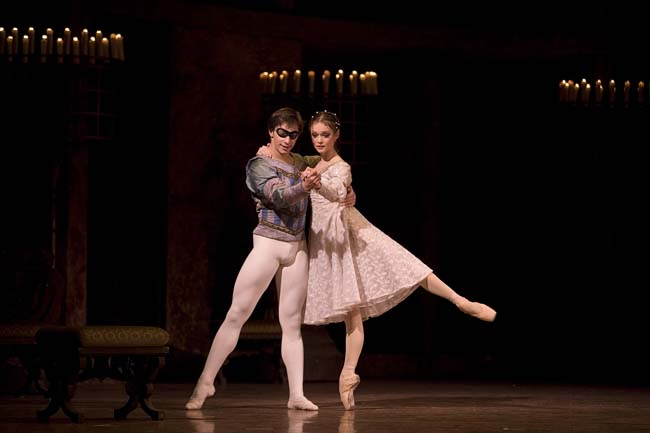
- Dronina and Olaf Kollmannsperger in Romeo and Juliet (2007)
- Born: March 27, 1986 (age 39); Saratov, USSR
- Occupations: Principal dancer, Artistic Director of Lithuanian National Ballet 2025-present
- Spouse: Serguei Endinian
- Children: 3
- Career
- Current group: Lithuanian National Opera and Ballet Theatre
- Former groups: Royal Swedish Ballet; Dutch National Ballet; English National Ballet; National Ballet of Canada
- Dances: Ballet

Jurgita Dronina (born 27 March 1986) is a Lithuanian ballet dancer. Until 2024, she was a principal dancer with the National Ballet of Canada, having previously danced with Royal Swedish Ballet, Dutch National Ballet and English National Ballet. In January 2025, she was appointed artistic director of the Lithuanian National Ballet.

== Early life ==
Born in Saratov, USSR, Dronina's family moved to Vilnius, Lithuania when she was four. She studied ballroom dancing and then moved to gymnastics. When she was nine, a choreographer suggested that she try ballet. She attended the Čiurlionis School of Art in Vilnius and the Hochschule für Musik und Theater in Munich.

== Career ==
In 2005, Dronina joined the Royal Swedish Ballet in Stockholm, after she was spotted by the company's then-director, Madeleine Onne, at several competitions. She became a soloist in 2007, after stepping in to dance Nikiya in Natalia Makarova's La Bayadère (2006) to cover the injured dancer's performance and Juliet in MacMillan's Romeo and Juliet (2007). In 2009, when she was returning from Verona where she had danced as a guest artist the role of Kitri in Don Quixote, she was asked, at the last minute, to perform Odette/Odile in Swan Lake as the scheduled performer was ill. She completed the assignment so successfully that she was promoted to principal dancer, at age 22.

In 2010, after she had again performed the role of Kitri as a guest artist in Amsterdam, artistic director Ted Brandsen was so impressed he offered her a principal contract with the Dutch National Ballet. As she was looking for a broader variety of works, she accepted the position.

In 2015, after Dronina contacted Karen Kain, the director of the National Ballet of Canada to join the company as a principal dancer. Dronina made the move as she wanted to have a good balance between classical works and new productions, and believed Toronto was more suitable for her family.

Dronina was a resident guest principal with Hong Kong Ballet between 2015 and 2017, under the direction of Madeleine Onne. She hosted and danced in an International Ballet Star gala for the 90th Anniversary of the Lithuanian National Ballet.

In 2017, after dancing Mary Skeaping's Giselle with the English National Ballet as a guest artist, she joined the company as a Lead Principal Dancer, but remained a Principal Dancer at the National Ballet of Canada. She danced at both companies, sharing her time between London and Toronto from 2018 to 2020, but when the COVID-19 pandemic hit, she settled in Toronto. In 2020, English National Ballet announced that Dronina would not return in the 2020–21 season, but confirmed she would continue to dance with the National Ballet of Canada.

In 2023, Dronina was featured as one of the main characters alongside Karen Kain in “Swan Song” Documentary Series and Feature Film (TIFF) & (BFI London) by CBC, Canada.

Dronina gave her final performance with the National Ballet of Canada in Giselle on 24 November 2024. On 6 January 2025 her appointment as artistic director of the Lithuanian National Ballet was announced.

== Awards ==
Dronina is a winner of International Ballet Competitions:

- Gold Medal in France, 2003
- Silver Medal in Helsinki, Finland, 2005
- Silver Medal in Moscow, Russia, 2005
- Silver Medal in Jackson, USA, 2006

In 2008, Dronina was awarded The Rotary International Award.

In 2009, she was awarded a Swedish-Danish cultural grant by Queen Margrethe II of Denmark.

In 2011, she received the Dutch Zwaan (swan) award for her role of Aurora in The Sleeping Beauty.

In 2014 Dronina was awarded the Alexandra Radius award for Outstanding Dancer of the Year with Dutch National Ballet. Alexandra Radius commented on Dronina's interpretations of Diamonds and Emeralds in George Balanchine's Jewels and Tchaikovsky pas de deux: “…any role she touches, turns to gold…”.

In 2018 Dronina was a Prix Benois de la Danse nominee for her role of Juliet in Rudolf Nureyev's Romeo and Juliet and Sylphide in Auguste Bournonville / F. Andersen's La Sylphide with English National Ballet, and was also a nominee of the Critic's Circle National Dance Critics Awards for the best female dancer of the year in the United Kingdom.

In 2018 Dronina was awarded the Cross of Knight in the Order for Merits to Lithuania by President of Lithuania Dalia Grybauskaitė for distinguished merits in culture worldwide. The same year on October 25, she was awarded the Baltic Assembly Prize for the Arts for her contribution to Arts, Dance and Culture. Dronina was named the most influential person in Arts and Culture to Lithuania in the 2020-21 Governmental Yearbook of Lithuania.

== Critical reception ==
Reviewing La Sylphide, The Globe and Mail called her "an irresistible performer" and "there is sensuality in her movement that teeters between the creature and the woman." On her performance in Swan Lake, The Guardian wrote "her execution impeccably clean, not an ounce of energy wasted – there is something unreal about her."

== Selected repertoire ==
Dronina's repertoire includes:

Danced in works by Mauro Bigonzetti, William Forsythe, Hans van Manen, Sidi-Larbi Cherkaoui, Rudi Van Dantzig, Toer Van Schayk, David Dawson, Jorma Elo, Christian Spuck, Krzysztof Pastor, Nils Christe, Jan-Christophe Maillot, Benjamin Millepied, Juanjo Arques, Guillaume Côté, Will Tuckett, Liam Scarlett, and Alonzo King.

- Nikiya in La Bayadère
- Princess Aurora in The Sleeping Beauty
- Juliet in Romeo and Juliet (Rudolf Nureyev)
- The title role in Giselle
- Odette/Odile in Swan Lake
- Kitri in Don Quixote
- Medora in Le Corsaire
- Sylvia in Sylvia (John Neumeier)
- Sugar Plum/Clara in The Nutcracker
- The title role in Cinderella (Christopher Wheeldon)
- Cinderella in The Cinderella (James Kudelka)
- Hermione in The Winter's Tale
- The Sylph in La Sylphide
- Lead Woman in Les Sylphides (Michel Fokine)
- Swanilda in Coppélia
- Pinocchio
- A Streetcar Named Desire
- La Dame Aux Camellias
- The Firebird
- Tchaikovsky pas de deux
- 2nd Movement and 4th Movement of Symphony in C
- Diamonds & Emeralds in Jewels
- Waltz and Russian Girl in Serenade
- Song of the Earth
- Manon in Manon
- Queen Sofia Magdalena in Gustav the III (Partice Bart)
- Esmeralda in The Hunchback of Notre-Dame
- Tatiana and Olga in Onegin
- Olga in On The Dnieper (Alexei Ratmansky)
- Lead duet in No Man's Land (Liam Scarlett)

== Personal life ==
Dronina is married to former Dutch National Ballet dancer Serguei Endinian. Their first son was born in 2012 in Amsterdam. Their second son was born in 2021 in Toronto, as was their daughter in 2023. The family resides in Toronto.
