= Pierre Brabant =

Canadian composer and pianist

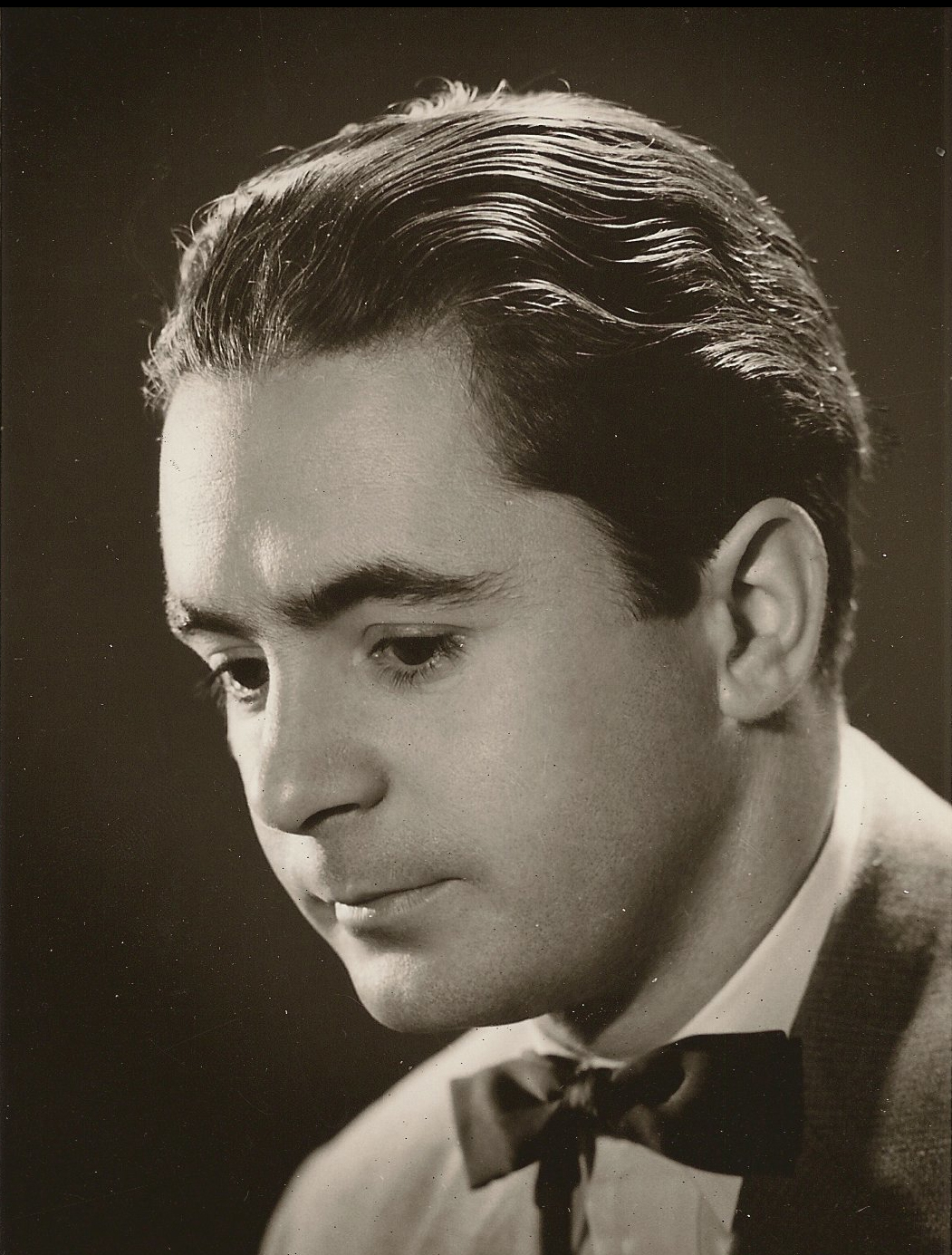
Pierre Brabant

Pierre Brabant (26 August 1925 – 28 August 2014) was a Canadian composer and pianist. He appeared in concerts and recitals throughout Canada and performed numerous times on Canadian television and radio. He wrote music for a number of programs for the Canadian Broadcasting Corporation and worked as a composer, arranger, and music director for numerous recordings by a variety of Canadian artists. Starting in 1987 he performed regularly in concerts and recitals as the accompanist for opera singer Joseph Rouleau.

== Life and career ==
Brabant was born in Montreal, Quebec, he began his studies in piano as a child and gave his first public recital while a teenager. In 1942 he appeared on the Canadian Broadcasting Corporation program Young Artists of Tomorrow. The following year he was awarded first prize in the CBC radio competition Les Talents de chez-nous. From 1942 to 1943 he was a piano student of Raymond David and Joseph-Élie Savaria.

In 1947-1948 Brabant took a sojourn in Paris, after which he embarked on a Canadian recital tour; giving a total of 78 recitals. He notably included some of his own compositions in his recital program, including Sonatine en do, Caprice laurentien, Cinq Cantilènes and Cinq Églogues. In his review of Brabant's 1948 recital at Plateau Hall in Montreal Jean Vallerand wrote, "Pierre Brabant is a splendid pianist and a fine artist. He also is a very intelligent, sensitive composer, with a solid technique and something to say."

In 1949 Brabant studied the organ with Marcel Dupré in Paris. That same year his ballet La Gaspésienne, which was choreographed by Ruth Sorel, premiered in Montreal. The ballet was given performances in Toronto, New York City, and at the Great Theatre, Warsaw in 1950. He entered the Conservatoire de musique du Québec à Montréal in 1951 where he studied for two years. In 1954 he appeared as a soloist on several CBC Television programs, including L'Heure du concert. In 1957 he pursued studies in the organ with Eugène Lapierre.

In the early 1960s Brabant developed an interest in expanding his compositional repertoire into the pop music genre. One of his earliest forays into this area was the music for Jean-Pierre Ferland's program Feuilles de gui, which was awarded prizes in 1962 from the CBC and in Brussels. Several soundtracks for CBC children's programs followed, including Tour de terre, Au clair de soleil, and Soleil et jours de pluie. He also composed music for a number of albums for children, including 20 Contes pour enfants par Tante Lucille for RCA. He also recorded the theme song and played the background music for the popular TV series Rue des Pignons from 1967 to 1978, and composed music for the TV show La Semaine verte.

Brabant served as music director and arranger for several recordings during the 1960s through the 1980s, including ones by Jean-Paul Filion, Hervé Brousseau, Georges Dor and Félix Leclerc. In 1987 he began working regularly with bass Joseph Rouleau as an accompanist. Many of their recitals together have been devoted to Leclerc's music.
