= Misa Kuranaga =

Japanese ballerina

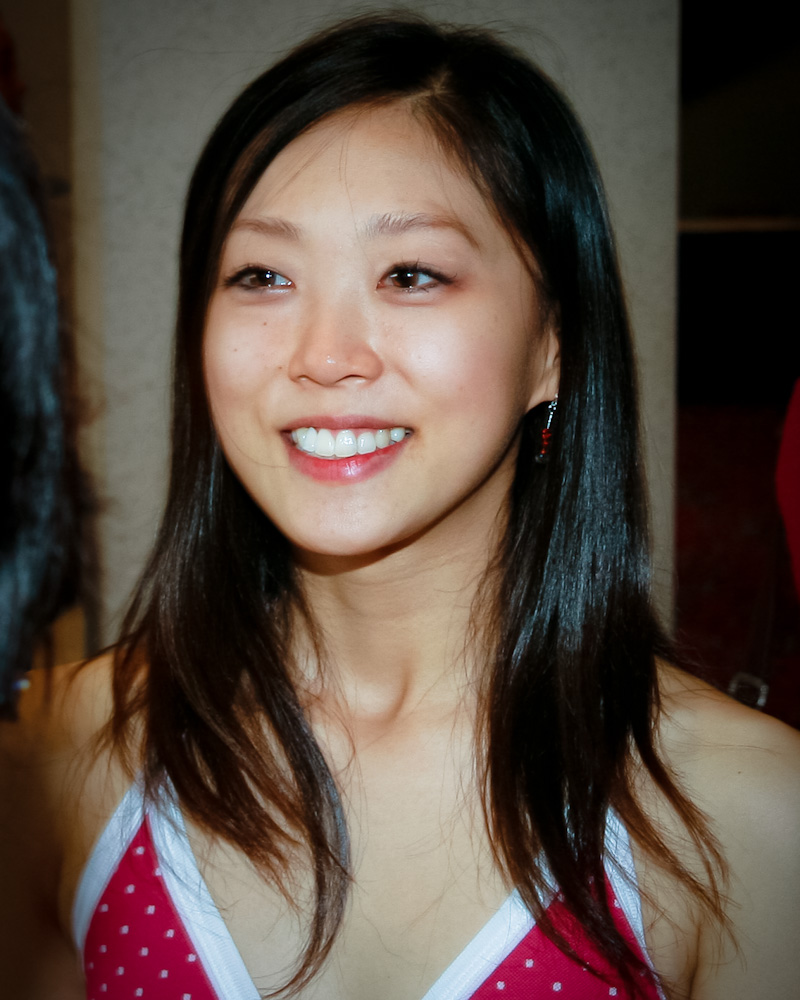
- Kuranaga at USA IBC press conference in 2006
- Born: 1982 or 1983 (age 43–44); Osaka Prefecture, Japan
- Occupation: Ballerina
- Dancing career
- Current group: San Francisco Ballet
- Former groups: Boston Ballet

Misa Kuranaga (Japanese: 倉永美沙, romanized: Kuranaga Misa, born 1982/1983) is a Japanese ballerina. She is a principal dancer at the San Francisco Ballet. She was formerly a dancer at Boston Ballet, and was the first Asian person to be promoted to principal dancer there.

== Career ==
Misa Kuranaga initially trained at the Jinushi Kaoru Ballet School in her native Japan and then received additional training at the School of American Ballet in New York City. Before joining Boston Ballet in 2003 she was a member of the San Francisco Ballet. In Boston she was promoted to soloist in 2005 and to principal dancer in 2009. Kuranaga was the first Asian person to be promoted to principal dancer at Boston Ballet. She returned to San Francisco Ballet as a principal dancer in 2019.

Kuranaga started her competition career at the Chubu National Ballet Competition where she was the youngest participant to win the gold medal in the pre-junior division. When she was only ten years old she was invited by Bolshoi Ballet director Yuri Grigorovich to participate in the Moscow International Ballet Competition Gala. She received a scholarship award at the Prix de Lausanne competition in 2001 and also won a gold medal as a Junior in the Moscow IBC that same year.

In 2006 she won the senior gold medal at the USA International Ballet Competition.

In 2006, she was named one of "25 to Watch" by Dance Magazine.

She has been a guest performer with the New York City Ballet (2009) and the Vail International Dance Festival (2009, 2010).

== Repertory ==
Her repertory includes the title role in George Balanchine's Coppelia, Florence Clerc's La Bayadere (Nikiya), Sir Frederick Ashton's La Fille Mal Gardée (Lise); August Bournonville's La Sylphide (the Sylphide); Marius Petipa's The Sleeping Beauty (Princess Aurora, Songbird Fairy, Princess Florine, and Jewels), Maina Gielgud's Giselle (Giselle, Peasant Pas de Deux, Lead Wili), Le Corsaire Pas de Deux; Mikko Nissinen's The Nutcracker (Snow Queen, Sugar Plum Fairy, and Clara) and Swan Lake (Pas de Trois, Neapolitan, and Black Swan); Rudolf Nureyev's Don Quixote (Amour/Cupid), and leading solos in his Pas De Dix from Raymonda Act III Divertissements; the Pas de Trois and solo variations from Paquita; James Kudelka's Cinderella; John Cranko's The Taming of the Shrew and Romeo and Juliet; George Balanchine's Divertimento No. 15, Concerto Barocco, Serenade, Ballo Della Regina(lead principal), Jewels, Rubies (lead principal), Who Cares?, La Valse, Stars and Stripes, A Midsummer Night's Dream; Mikhail Fokine's Les Sylphides; Mark Morris' Up and Down; Twyla Tharp's In the Upper Room; and Lucinda Childs' Ten Part Suite, as well as works by Jiri Kylian and Jorma Elo.

== Galas/Guesting ==
She has danced the following classical pas de deuxs at galas and festivals in Japan, US, and Europe: Flames of Paris, Giselle Act II, Don Quixote, Le Corsaire, La Esmeralda (Tambourine), Diana and Acteon, Black Swan, Paquita (Lead Etoile), Balcony Scene from Romeo and Juliet (Lavrovsky version), title-role of Juliet in Romeo and Juliet (full-length, Lavrovsky version), La Sylphide Act II, Rose Adagio from The Sleeping Beauty, amongst others. From George Balanchine's repertory, she has danced the following gala pieces: Stars and Stripes, Tarantella, Tchaikovsky Pas de Deux, Rubies from Jewels, selections from Who Cares.
