= Rue des Pignons =

- Genre: Drama
- Country of origin: Canada
- Original language: French
- No. of episodes: 414

Original release
- Network: Radio Canada
- Release: 1966 – 1977

Rue des Pignons is a Canadian French-language TV series which ran from 1966 to 1977. Radio-Canada has reportedly lost most of the episodes of the series, only managing to trace about 35 of the 414 episodes from 1966 to 1977. The program's theme song was composed and recorded by Pierre Brabant who also played much of the show's background music.

== Plot ==
The plot thickens within an ordinary family residing in a working-class neighborhood of Montreal. It revolves around the experiences and relationships of family members and the local residents of the Pignons Street vicinity.

== Cast ==
- Rolland Bédard - Anatole Marsouin
- Juliette Béliveau - Bijou Bousquet
- Jean Duceppe - Emery Lafeuille
- Louise Deschatelets - Doudou Désiré
