= Ruth Abramovitsch Sorel =

German choreographer and dancer (born 1907)

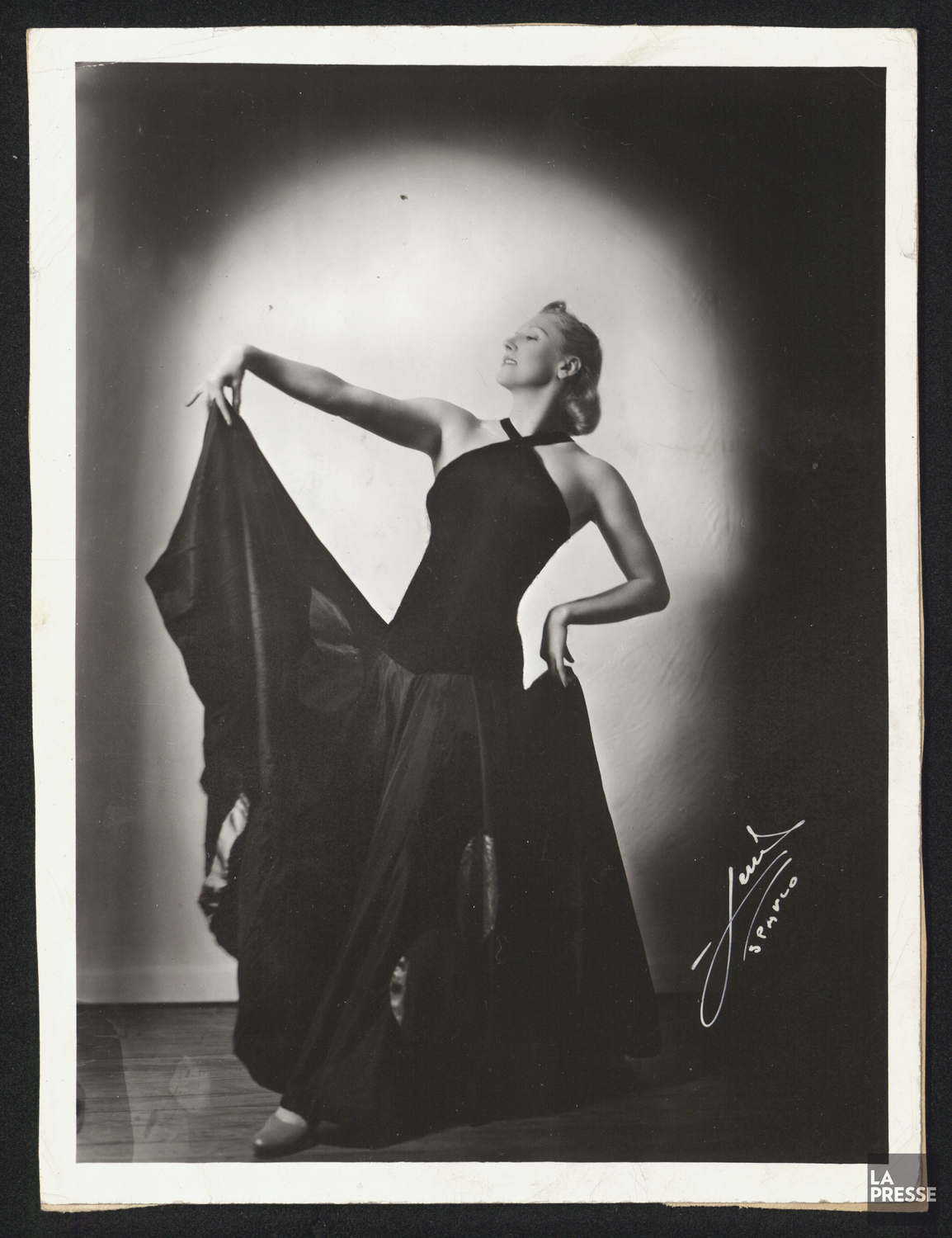
Ruth Sorel

Ruth Elly Abramovitsch Sorel (18 June 1907 – 1 April 1974) was a German choreographer, dancer, artistic director and teacher. She spent the first half of her career working mainly in Europe (particularly Warsaw) and then was predominantly active in Canada after moving to that nation in 1944. In Canada she worked under the stage name "Ruth Sorel", but in Europe she was known under her maiden name, Abramovitsch (sometimes spelled Abramowitz).

The Canadian Encyclopedia states that Abramovitsch Sorel was, "A well-known, expressive performer, who was praised by local and international critics for her intensely theatrical German dance style, her literary inspiration and the emotion, musicality and precision of her execution... Working in Canada prior to the existence of grants for innovation, Sorel was a pioneer of European expressionism in Québec." As a choreographer she was at the forefront of modern dance and contemporary ballet, combining two contrasting elements: German expressionist dance and classical ballet. For many years she operated and directed her own dance company in Montreal, Les Ballets Ruth Sorel (also known as the Ruth Sorel Modern Dance Group).

== Early life and career ==
Born to Polish-Jewish parents in Halle, Saxony-Anhalt, Abramovitsch Sorel studied Dalcroze eurhythmics before becoming a dancer in Mary Wigman's company in Dresden in 1923 where she remained for six seasons. From 1927–1933 she was a principal dancer with the Berlin State Opera where she was much admired as the lead soloist in the ballet Legend of Joseph.

Abramovitsch Sorel was forced to leave the Berlin State Opera by the Nazis due to her Jewish heritage and Communist leanings. She left Germany for Poland in 1933 where she soon won first prize at the international solo dance competition in Warsaw for her performance of Salomé's dance of the seven veils. From 1933–1939 she taught dance and directed student productions at Warsaw's advanced dance school. She also actively performed in Poland during those years, often appearing with dancer George Groke with whom she gave performance tours to Palestine and the United States during the 1930s. At the outbreak of World War II she emigrated from Poland to Brazil. She attempted to start a dance academy in that nation but was unsuccessful.

== Career in Canada and later years in Poland ==
In 1944 Abramovitsch Sorel emigrated to Canada with her husband, the author Michał Choromański. The couple settled in Montréal and Sorel soon opened a number of dance studios in the area, including studios in Westmount, Shawinigan, and Trois-Rivières. At the latter studio she frequently presented her most gifted students in recital, often dancing herself.

Abramovitsch Sorel quickly established herself as an important choreographer and dancer in the Québec region, now using the stage name "Ruth Sorel". She formed the Les Ballets Ruth Sorel which had a triumphant success representing Québec at the first Canadian Ballet Festival (CBF) in 1948 in Winnipeg. Later the National Film Board of Canada's documentary of the CBF included sequences from her celebrated Mea Culpa Mea Culpa, a medieval mystery. Sorel's dance company performed her choreography on tours in Canada and in the United States, notably giving performances at dance festivals in New York City and at Montréal's Chalet du Mont-Royal. In 1949 she had a major success in Montreal with La Gaspésienne, the first choreography with Québécois content, which used music by Pierre Brabant. The ballet was given performances in Toronto, New York City, and at the Great Theatre, Warsaw in 1950.

In 1955 Abramovitsch Sorel and her husband left Canada suddenly for Poland. She lived in Warsaw for the remainder of her life. She died there in 1974 at the age of 66.
