= Brooklyn Mack =

American ballet dancer

- Born: 1986 or 1987 (age 38–39); Elgin, Kershaw County, South Carolina, U.S.
- Education: Kirov Academy of Ballet
- Occupation: ballet dancer
- Children: 1
- Career
- Former groups: Joffrey Ballet; American Ballet Theatre Studio Company; Orlando Ballet; The Washington Ballet

Brooklyn Devon Mack is an American ballet dancer. He is currently the Interim Artistic Director of Columbia Classical Ballet since November 11, 2021.

== Early life ==
Mack was born in Elgin, Kershaw County, South Carolina, and is the youngest of four children. When the nurse had to put a name on his birth certificate but his mother had not chosen one, his sister told the nurse he is named Brooklyn Devon Mack, and the nurse left before his mother could react.

At age 12, after seeing a performance of the Columbia Classical Ballet company, and learning that ballet could help football players, he and his mother agreed that he would start ballet, and in exchange he could go to a football tryout. His mother took him to Pavlovich Dance School, and asked the school give him a scholarship. Although the school did not have scholarships, the school agreed to give one to Mack, but he had to take classes six times a week, which he accepted. Two years later, he enrolled at the Kirov Academy of Ballet on scholarship in Washington DC, where he was the only African American student; he trained there for three years. He had also attended summer courses at the School of American Ballet in New York City.

== Career ==
In 2004, Mack became an apprentice with Joffrey Ballet in Chicago, and joined the American Ballet Theatre Studio Company the following year. In 2006, he started dancing with Orlando Ballet as a principal. In 2009, after Bruce Marks, then- director of the company left, Mack accepted an invitation from artistic director Septime Webre to join The Washington Ballet. He also participated in the company's community outreach program. He was named Dance Magazine's "25 to Watch" 2012. He also competed in several international competition, and in 2012, he won the senior gold medal Varna International Ballet Competition, the first African American to do so.

In 2015, when the Washington Ballet danced Swan Lake for the first time, he was chosen to dance the role of Prince Siegfried, with guest star Misty Copeland as Odette/Odile, the first time two African Americans danced the lead roles in Swan Lake. Also in 2015, he danced with the English National Ballet as a guest artist, and toured with the company to Palais Garnier, Paris. He had also danced in galas along with dancers from American Ballet Theatre, New York City Ballet and Alvin Ailey American Dance Theater.

In 2018, Mack left the Washington Ballet due to disagreements with the new management over salary, workload, and guesting opportunities. Mack then made a guest appearance at the Hong Kong Ballet, where Webre went to direct. In June 2019, he appeared in American Ballet Theatre's Le Corsaire as Conrad and Ali, after artistic director Kevin McKenzie's assistant contacted him via Instagram. He performed his first show without a dress rehearsal as he filled in for an injured dancer. In August 2019, he returned to English National Ballet as a guest artist, and stayed until January 2020, during which time he danced Le Corsaire, Christopher Wheeldon's Cinderella and the company's 70th anniversary gala.

Mr. Mack became the Interim Artistic Director of Columbia Classical Ballet November 11, 2021.

== Personal life ==
Mack has a son.

== Selected repertoire ==
Mack's repertoire includes:

- George Wilson in The Great Gatsby (originated)
- Prince Siegfried in Swan Lake
- Crassus in Spartacus
- Basilio and Espada in Don Quixote
- Conrad and Ali in Le Corsaire
- Albrecht in Giselle
- Romeo in Romeo and Juliet
- Benjamin in Cinderella

== Awards and honors ==
- 2006: USA International Ballet Competition - silver medal
- 2007: Princess Grace Award
- 2009: Helsinki International Ballet Competition - silver prize
- 2012: Dance Magazine's "25 to Watch"
- 2012: Istanbul Ballet Competition - Grand Prix
- 2012: Varna International Ballet Competition - gold medal
