= Aspendos International Opera and Ballet Festival =

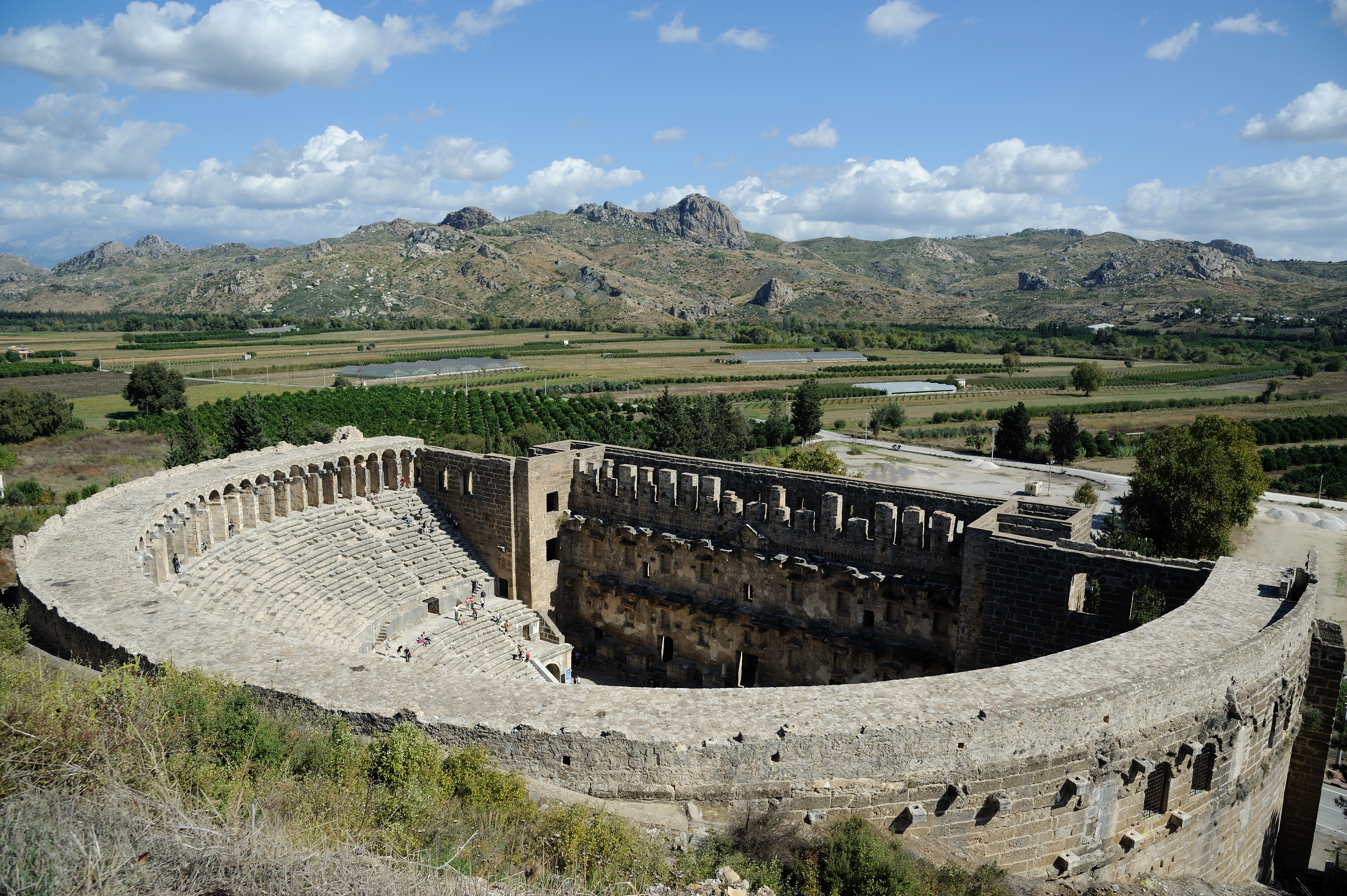
The Aspendos theatre

The Aspendos International Opera and Ballet Festival (in Turkish: Aspendos Uluslararası Opera ve Bale Festivali) has been organized in Aspendos, near Antalya, Turkey by the Turkish State Opera and Ballet directorate since 1994 with international participation by opera and ballet companies from several countries. The festival is held annually each September in the two-thousand-year-old Roman theatre. The theatre is noted as one of the best preserved antique theatres in the world, with many original features of the building remaining intact.

== Organisation ==
The first Aspendos International Opera and Ballet Festival was organized by the Turkish State Opera and Ballet in 1994. It achieved international status in 1998, and now has international participation by opera and ballet companies from several countries. The festival is held annually each June and July in the two-thousand-year-old Roman theatre. The theatre is noted as one of the best preserved antique theatres in the world, with many original features of the building remaining intact. The audience capacity is 2–4000 people.

== Past performances ==
In 2006, a wide variety of productions were presented by companies such as the Ankara State Opera and Ballet (a popular opera such as Aida) and the Mersin State Opera and Ballet with La Bayadère by Léon Minkus, Carmen (Georges Bizet), and Carmina Burana by (Carl Orff). Other companies included the Ballett Zürich, the İzmir State Opera and Ballet (which presented Jivago/Zhivago by Alexander Borodin), and the Deutsche Oper Berlin with The Magic Flute. The 26th festival, in 2019, included Carmen and Swan Lake.

The 2024 event was the 31st festival, and opened with a production of Aida, performed by the Ankara and Antalya State Opera and Ballet companies, and the lead roles sung by soprano Joana Zhelezcheva and tenor Walter Fraccaro. The festival also included a performance of Tosca and an Opera Gala.

== See also ==
- List of opera festivals
- Canadian Ballet Festival
- International Ballet Festival of Havana
- USA International Ballet Competition
