= Sarah Lamb (dancer) =

Ballet dancer

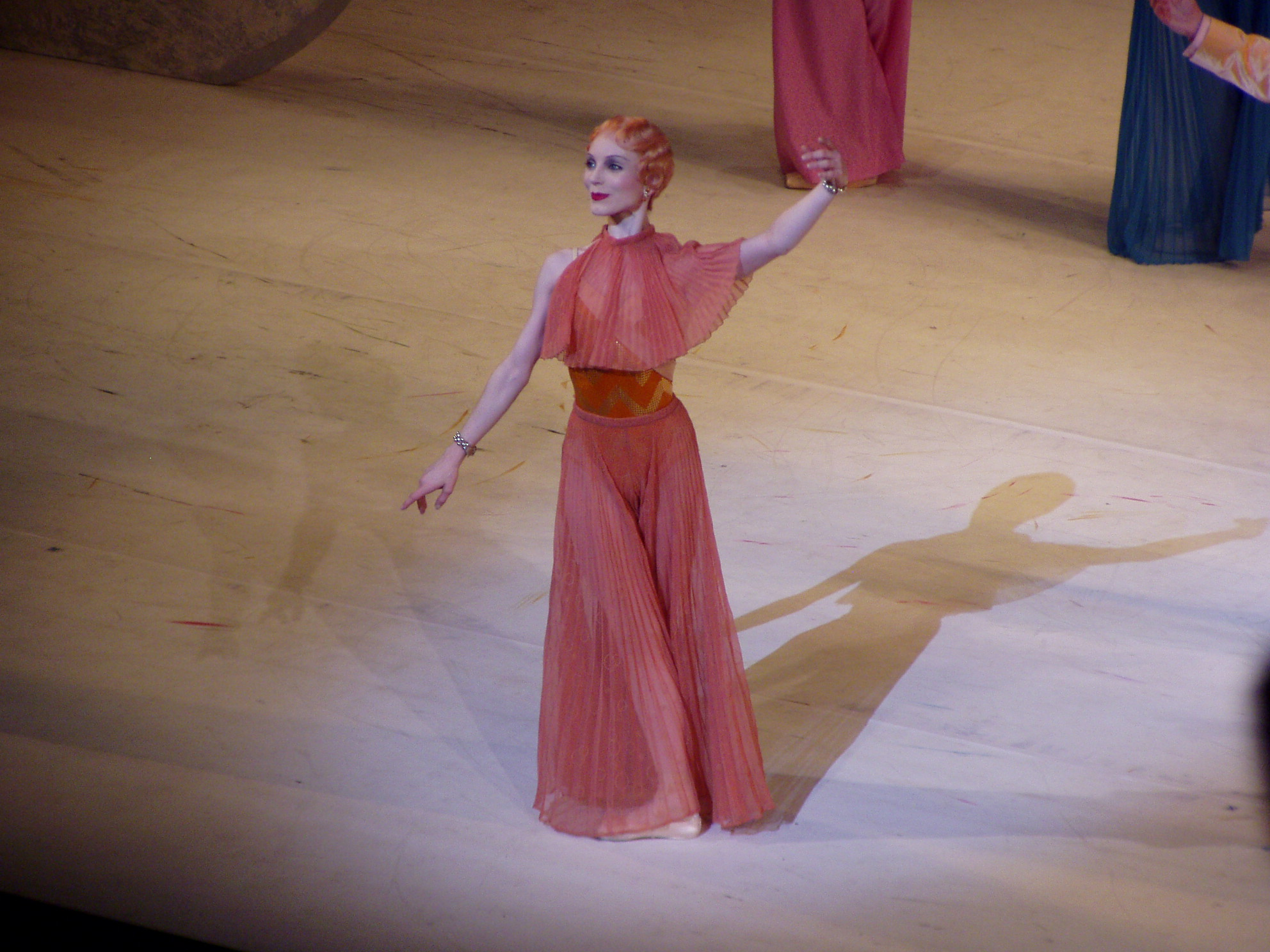
- Lamb in 2007
- Born: 17 October 1980 (age 45); Boston, Massachusetts, U.S.
- Occupation: Ballet dancer
- Spouse: Patrick Thornberry (m. 2005)

Portrait of a Dancer from Nowness with Sarah Lamb

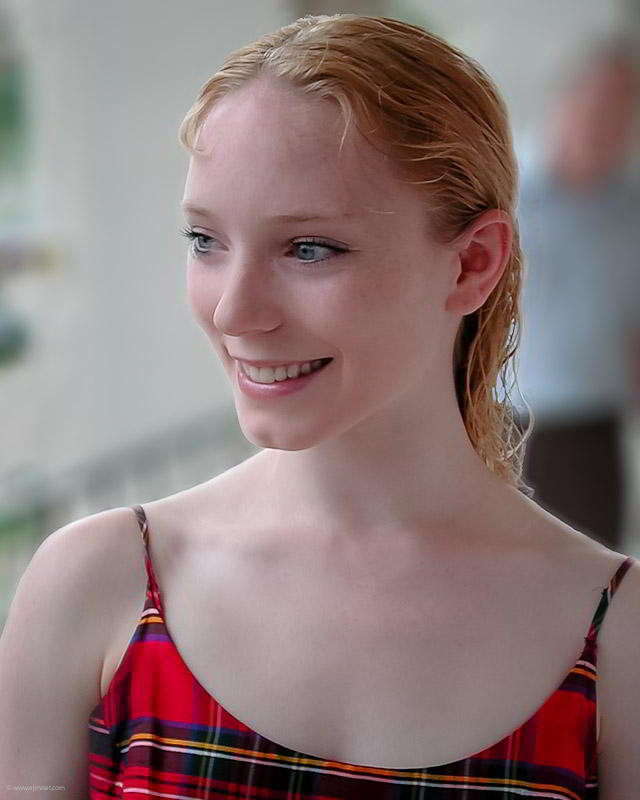
Sarah Lamb at the press conference where she won a silver medal at the 2002 USA International Ballet Competition in Jackson, Mississippi, US

Sarah Lamb (born 17 October 1980) is an American principal ballet dancer with The Royal Ballet, London.

== Early life ==
Born in Boston, Massachusetts, Lamb is the second of three daughters born to Kathleen and John Lamb. Her father is English and moved to the United States in 1950 as a child, after the death of his father.

She first started with tap, then modern dance at age four and at six, started proper ballet at the Boston Ballet School. She was chosen to star as Clara for Boston Ballet's 100th anniversary performance of The Nutcracker. Lamb began training with Madame Tatiana Legat, at the Boston Ballet School aged 13. She trained with Madame Legat for four years and continued to be coached by her for a year after she joined Boston Ballet's second company.

She was awarded a gold medal in 1998 by U.S. President Bill Clinton after being named a Presidential Scholar in the Arts. With Legat's coaching she won three silver medals in 1999 at the International Ballet Competition in Nagoya, Japan, the Sixth NY IBC in 2000, and the USA IBC in 2002.

== Career and repertory ==
She joined Boston Ballet in 1999 as a corps de ballet, was promoted to soloist in 2001 and principal in 2003. She joined The Royal Ballet in August 2004 as a first soloist and was promoted to principal in 2006.

Lamb's repertory includes the roles of: Sylphide (La Sylphide), Marie Larisch (Mayerling), Tatiana and Olga (Onegin), Thaïs pas de deux, Masha (Winter Dreams), Voluntaries, Polyphonia, The Grey Area, Afternoon of a Faun, Chroma, Infra, Tanglewood, Sylvia, Stop Time Rag Girl (Elite Syncopations), white girl and blue girl (Les Patineurs), Fin du Jour, Alice (Alice's Adventures in Wonderland), Princess Belle Rose (The Prince of the Pagodas) and Human Seasons, Manon (L'histoire de Manon).

=== 1998-2004 Boston Ballet ===
- Odette/Odile in Swan Lake
- Juliet in Romeo and Juliet (by Rudi Van Dantzig)
- Lise in La fille mal gardée
- Gamzatti in La Bayadère
- Olga in Eugene Onegin
- Myrtha and Peasant Pas de deux in Giselle
- Queen of the Dryads and Danseuse de Rue in Nureyev's Don Quixote
- The Sugar Plum Fairy, Dew Drop Fairy and Snow Queen in The Nutcracker
- Princess Aurora and Princess Florine in The Sleeping Beauty
- In the Middle...Somewhat Elevated by Forsythe
- La Fille Mal Gardee (2003, with guest artist Carlos Acosta)

== Personal life ==
Sarah Lamb's grandmother, Helen Lamb (affectionately known as "Hellcat"), founded a summer camp for handicapped children called Camp Jabberwocky. Her father and mother, John and Kathleen Lamb, ran the camp for many summers after Helen retired. Sarah and her two sisters, Caitlin and Dorian, worked at the camp as counselors, under their parents' aegis. In the summer of 2009, Sarah performed a ballet with three of the campers in the end-of-summer camp play.

Sarah Lamb married fellow dancer, California-born Patrick Thornberry, in 2005, and they reside in London. Thornberry now has a business teaching yoga.
