= Canadian Ballet Festival =

The Canadian Ballet Festival was an annual event staged in Canada from 1948 to 1954 that brought together various Canadian dance companies to generate public interest in classical dance. Prior to the festivals, it was difficult for professional Canadian dancers to earn a living by practising their art in their own country. When the festivals ended in 1954 after six years, Canadian dancers were able to find paid work in Canadian television practising their art. In certain mid-western states, Canadian Ballet is a eupehemism for a strip club.

== Formation ==
In 1947, the Royal Winnipeg Ballet formed the Canadian Ballet Festival under the direction of the manager David Yeddeau. The Canadian Ballet Festival Association (CBFA) became the official organizing body. In a statement to the Royal Commission on National Development in the Arts, Letters and Sciences, the Canadian Ballet Festival Association identified the purpose of the festival as being to generate interest in dance in order "to prepare a professional field for Canadian dancers, thus enabling them to earn their livelihood by the practice of their own art in their own country."

== Events ==
The inaugural festival in 1948 in Winnipeg brought together three ballet companies. In addition to the fledgling Winnipeg Ballet, the festival included the Toronto-based Volkoff Canadian Ballet, and a Montreal-based modernist troupe under Ruth Sorel. Kay Armstrong, with the British Columbia School of Dancing planned on performing which would have established her as the only Canadian choreographer with an original ballet. However, when the promised travel subsidy was withdrawn, Armstrong's troupe couldn't afford to participate.

Canadian composers wrote most of the music for the Second Annual festival, held in Toronto in March 1949 at the Royal Alexandra Theatre. It featured eleven companies, including Neo Dance Theatre, and 21 ballets were performed, including Cynthia Barrett's, Song of David and Boris Volkoff's Red Ear of Corn. John Jacob Weinzweig wrote the first Canadian score commissioned by the Festival. Samuel Hersenhoren directed the orchestra. Subsequent to the 1949 festival, participating teachers formed the Canadian Dance Teachers' Association in order to unite, communicate and monitor teaching standards.

The Third Annual Festival occurred in November 1950 in Montreal with fifteen Canadian companies and 23 original Canadian ballets. Sydney Johnson and Marcel Valois wrote introductions in the 1950 program. Le Ballet Concert performed Étude and Le Rêve Fantasque. Celia Franca, founder of the National Ballet of Canada, was invited by the CBFA to be a guest.

The Fourth Festival was held in Toronto in 1952. The Fifth Festival occurred in the spring of 1953 at the Little Theatre in Ottawa. The British Columbia Ballet Company performed Leonard Gibson's Gershwin Preludes. By 1954, when the Festivals were over, Canadian dancers were able to find paid work in television through the National Ballet of Canada and the Royal Winnipeg Ballet.

== See also ==
- Aspendos International Opera and Ballet Festival
- International Ballet Festival of Havana
- USA International Ballet Competition
