= Jeune Ballet de France =

French ballet company

Jeune Ballet de France was a French ballet company founded by Petrus Bosman in 1974, based on the facilities of Rosella Hightower's École Superieure de Danse de Cannes, on the Riviera. It toured in Europe, Australia, and the Far East but was active for only a few years. A new company, using the same name, was founded by Robert Berthier in 1983. The current ballet master is Jean Marion.
