= International Ballet Festival of Havana =

Festival of Cuba remembering communist revolution in Cuba

International Ballet Festival in Havana
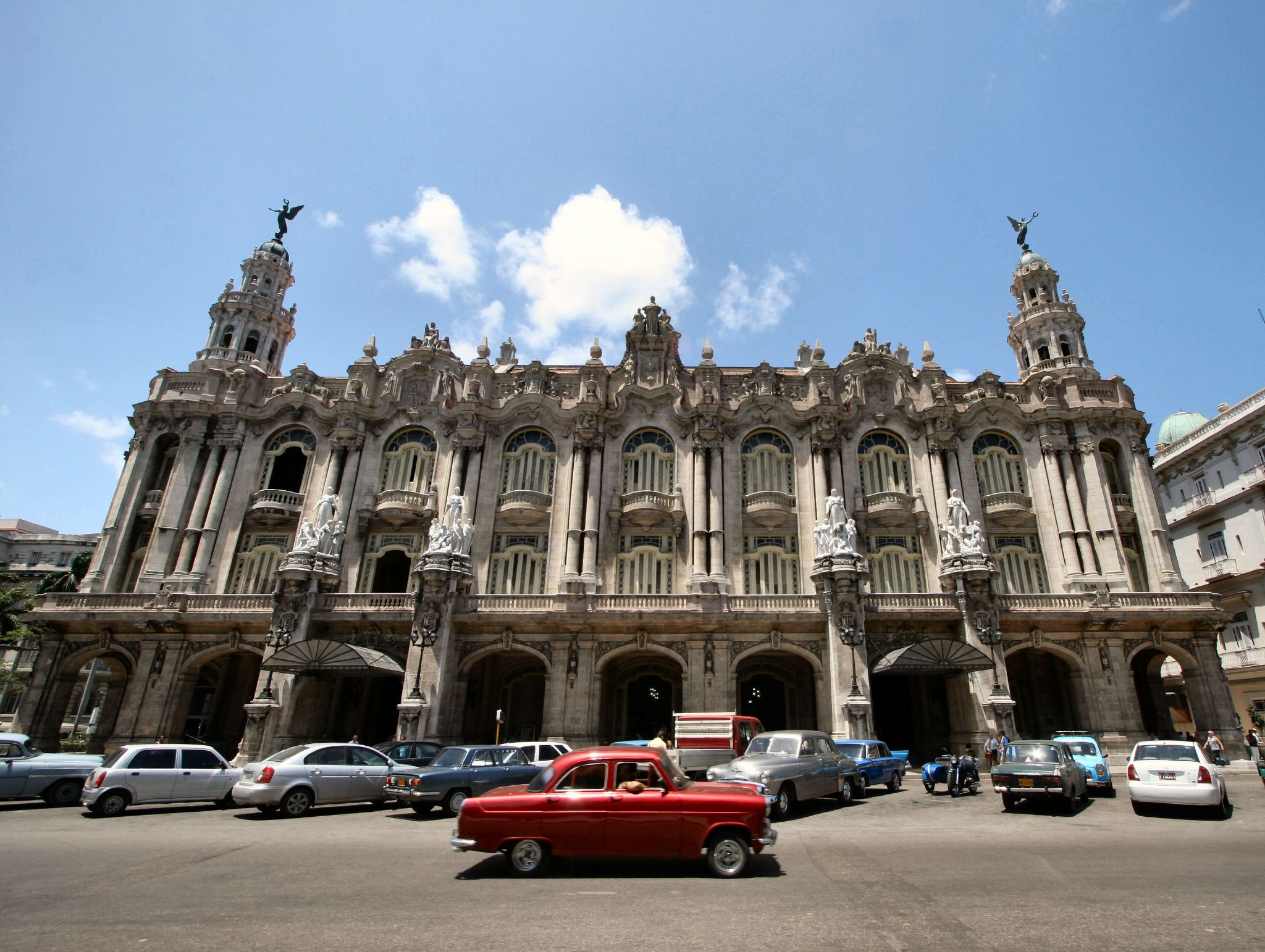
- Great Theatre of Havana opera house. Home of the International Festivals
- Genre: Ballet
- Dates: October 28–November 06, 2018
- Locations: Great Theatre of Havana, Cuba
- Years active: 1960 - Present

The International Ballet Festival of Havana (Festival de Ballet de La Havana) is a biennial ballet festival held in Havana, Cuba. It takes place in various theatres in the city, including the Great Theatre of Havana, the Karl Marx Theatre, and the Mella Theatre. The festival was created in 1960 by a joint effort of the Ballet Nacional de Cuba, the Instituto Nacional de la Industria Turística, and the cultural branches of the Cuban government. The International Ballet Festival of Havana was included in mass dissemination plans in the arts following the Cuban Revolution.

In 2023, the festival presented 20 performances including several world premieres. It is one of the oldest ballet festivals in the world.

== Festivals ==
=== 1st through 5th festivals ===
The years that followed the first three festivals, 1960, 1966, and 1967, involved graduated from the Escuela Nacional de Ballet (National Ballet School). The 4th festival was held in 1974, and was dedicated to the 2nd Congress of the Federation of Cuban Women. Since that year, the festival has been celebrated biannually. The 5th festival was dedicated to the 30th Anniversary of the Granma landing. The 6th festival was dedicated to the 30th Anniversary of the Foundation of the National Ballet of Cuba and to the 35th Anniversary of Alicia Alonso’s debut in the role of Giselle.

=== 8th festival ===
The 8th festival was about Latin America in choreographic creation. The event was the beginning of the First International Practical Course of the Cuban School of Ballet.

=== 11th-13th festivals ===
The 11th festival was dedicated to two anniversaries: the 150th Anniversary of the Gran Teatro de La Habana, the oldest theatrical institution of the country, and the 40th Anniversary of the foundation of the Ballet Nacional de Cuba.

The 12th had a slogan: "Past, present, and choreographic future”. The 12th festival emphasized the Ibero-American presence in ballet and choreography.

=== 15th and 16th festival ===
The 15th festival was about the composers and musical styles that influenced dance. There were galas dedicated to Cuban and French composers, baroque composers, Frédéric Chopin, Igor Stravinsky, and Manuel de Falla, and as well to the Russian composer Pyotr Ilyich Tchaikovsky, a figure in ballet.

The 16th festival was dedicated to the 50th Anniversary of the foundation of the Ballet Nacional de Cuba. The festival had Carla Fracci as a guest dancer. Two events in this festival were the inauguration of the Dance Museum and the celebration of the 1st Iberian American Choreographic Competition organized by the General Society of Authors and Editors (SGAE), the Author's Foundation, and the Ballet Nacional de Cuba.

=== 17th & 18th festival ===
The 17th festival was dedicated to the dancers that affected ballet in the 20th century. The festival featured six foreign companies: Ballet of Washington, the folkloric Ballet of Puebla, The Da Capo company and the Dance Group (Azahar) from Valencia, Spain, Dessau Ballet from Germany, and the Choreographic Centre of Valencia. There were also other representatives from seventeen countries in America, Asia and Australia.

The 18th festival was inaugurated by Fidel Castro, President of the State and Council of Ministers of Cuba.

== List of participants ==
- Europe (26)

Austria, Belgium, Bulgaria, Cyprus, Czechoslovakia, Denmark, Spain, Russian Federation, Finland, France, United Kingdom, Greece, Netherlands, Hungary, Italy, Latvia, Norway, Poland, Portugal, West Germany, East Germany, Romania, Sweden, Switzerland, Soviet Union, and Yugoslavia.

- Asia (6)

Philippines, Japan, Vietnam, China, Israel, and Kazakhstan

- Africa (4)

Angola, Algeria, Egypt, Guinea.

- North America (10)

Canada, Costa Rica, Dominican Republic, Guatemala, Martinique, Mexico, Nicaragua, Panama, Puerto Rico, and United States.

- Oceania (1)

Australia.

- South America (9)

Argentina, Brazil, Colombia, Chile, Ecuador, French Guiana, Peru, Uruguay, Venezuela.

Total: 56 countries

== Choreographic Premieres ==
World premieres: 198

Premieres in Cuba: 579

Total: 777 premieres

== See also ==
- Aspendos International Opera and Ballet Festival
- Canadian Ballet Festival
- USA International Ballet Competition
