= International Ballet Competition =

International Ballet Competition may refer to:

- The Margot Fonteyn International Ballet Competition, promoted by the Royal Academy of Dance, first held in 1931
- California Dance Classics, first held in San Francisco, California USA in 2017
- Helsinki International Ballet Competition, first held in 1989
- International Ballet Competition Hellas, held in Athens, Greece since 2001
- Japan International Ballet Competition, first held in 1993
- Moscow International Ballet Competition, first held in 1969
- New York International Ballet Competition, held from 1984 to 2009
- Serge Lifar International Ballet Competition, first held in 1994 in Kyiv and named after Serge Lifar
- Shanghai International Ballet Competition, first held in 2004
- South African International Ballet Competition, first held in 2008
- World Ballet Competition, first held in 2007 in Orlando, Florida
- USA International Ballet Competition, held in Jackson, Mississippi since 1979
- Varna International Ballet Competition, held at the unique outdoor theatre in Varna, Bulgaria, since 1964
- Rudolf Nureyev International Ballet Competition, held in Budapest, Hungary since 1994
- Youth America Grand Prix, held in New York, USA, since 1999
- Tallinn International Ballet Competition, held in Tallinn, Estonia, since 2014

== See also ==
- Prix Benois de la Danse, international ballet competition held in Moscow, Russia
- Prix de Lausanne, international ballet competition held in Lausanne, Switzerland
