= Brent Funderburk =

American painter and professor of arts (born 1952)

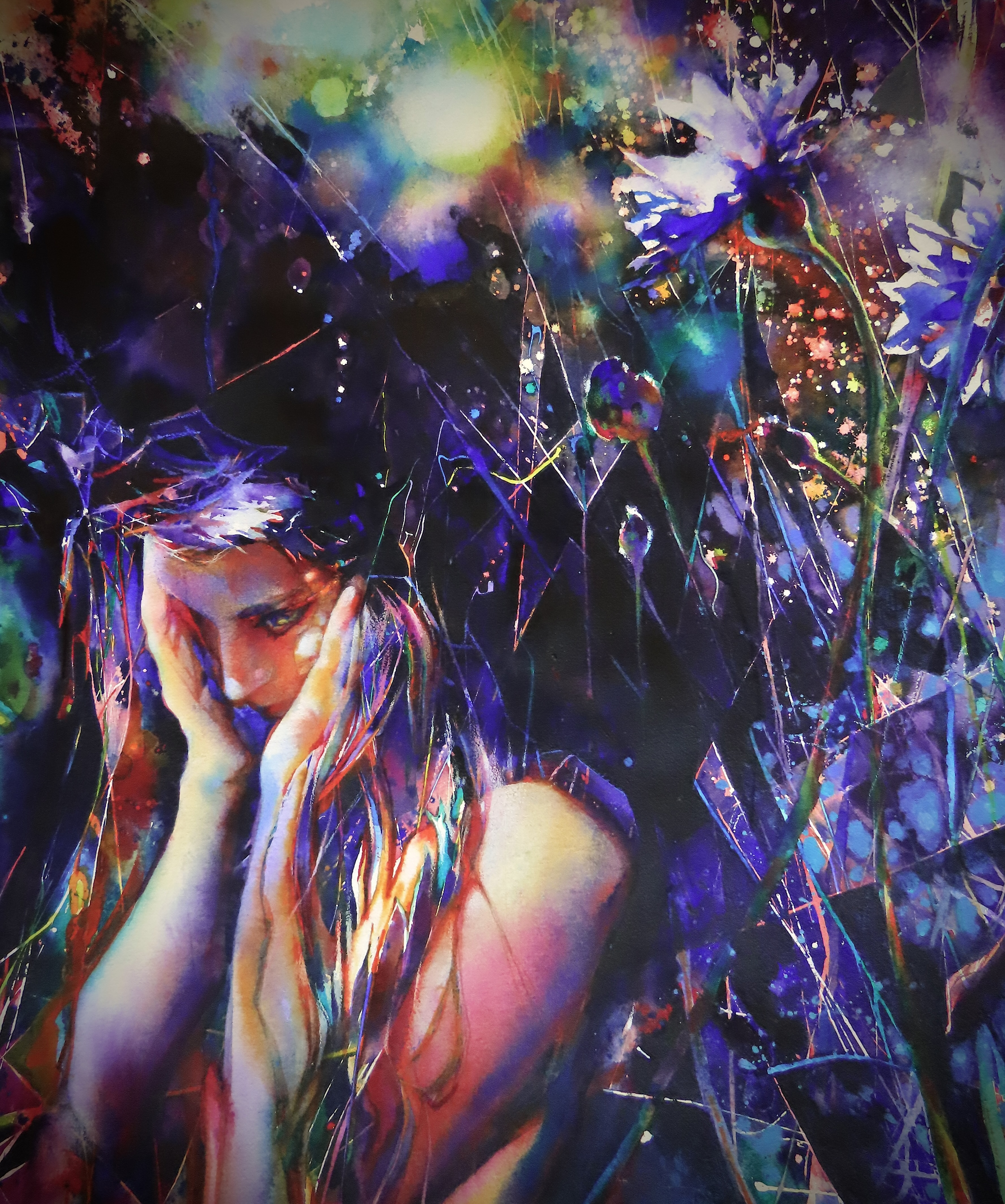
“Path of Light” (detail)

Thomas Brent Funderburk (born 1952 in Charlotte, North Carolina) is a long known visual artist and W. L. Giles Distinguished Professor Emeritus of Art at Mississippi State University, where he has worked since 1982. He is an active artist, known for his large-format, exuberantly hued, often naturalistic watermedia paintings. His art has been displayed in many juried exhibitions, specialized art magazines and annual publications. Funderburk is also noted for his illustrated lecture performances, curation, and workshops. Funderburk acknowledges influences by watercolor painters such as Charles E. Burchfield, Walter Inglis Anderson and Edward Reep. In 2024, he was the recipient of the Mississippi Governor's Arts Award for Excellence in Visual Arts and Education.

== Biography ==
Funderburk is married to dancer/choreographer Deborah Wyatt Funderburk, a retired university professor in dance at Mississippi State University. They reside in Starkville, Mississippi, and have two adult sons.

== Career ==
Funderburk graduated from East Carolina University School of Art and Design (Greenville, NC), receiving Bachelor's (BFA) and Master's (MFA) degrees in Fine Art and in Painting in 1975 and 1978, respectively. He taught art at Nebraska Wesleyan University before joining the faculty at Mississippi State University, Department of Art, which he headed from 1995 to 2002. Funderburk's watercolor series New Solar Myths was selected as part of works by 24 artists awarded internationally for Creative Quarterly's “Best 100 Annual” in 2015. Series Solar Myths, and Flying World were both featured in an article about Funderburk's art in Watercolor Artist magazine (“Drama, Extravagance and Poetry” by John A. Parks, August 2016). His recent solo exhibitions include a forty-year retrospective, Here and There: Brent Funderburk – Paintings and Drawings 1981–2021, at the Cullis Wade Depot Art Gallery, Mississippi State University (Starkville, MS, 2021), Flowering Earth at the Mary C. O’Keefe Cultural Arts Center (Ocean Springs, MS, 2023), and Path of Light, at the Meridian Museum of Art (Meridian, MS, 2024). His work has been regularly shown for several years in a number of art periodicals and annuals, including Watercolor Magazine, Watercolor Artist Magazine, Artists Magazine, Creative Quarterly, Southwestern Art, Splash: The Best of Watercolor, and in museum publications. In 2019–2020, Funderburk's pieces “Soul House (Red)”, “Anteroom”, “Angelus Vitae” and “Oaxaca” were recognized at several international online juried art competitions. He has spoken on American watercolor painting and 20th Century visionary modern American artists, as well as on art and architecture in many US campuses, museums, national parks, as well as in Rome, Italy. As a curator, Funderburk developed the touring exhibition Ecstasy: The Mystical Landscapes of Walter Inglis Anderson, which traveled with his lectures to art museums in southern states from 2008 to 2010. He has also lectured about Anderson in association with the Smithsonian Institution touring exhibit "Everything I See is New and Strange" (2003). Detailed materials associated with his art and career are kept at the Smithsonian Libraries.

== Awards ==
While at MSU, Funderburk received the John Grisham Faculty Excellence Award (1994), the Burlington Northern Excellence in Teaching Award (1986), the Ralph E. Powe Research Excellence Award (2015), and the Southeastern Conference Faculty Achievement Award (2016). In 2015, he was named William L. Giles Distinguished Professor. In 2010 he was named "Official Artist" for the 2010 USA International Ballet Competition. Funderburk's work Flying World was selected into the 2015 Shenzhen International Watercolour Biennial (Shenzhen, China, 2015) and further juried to tour several Chinese museums in 2015–16. In 2024, he gained the Mississippi Governor's Arts Award for Excellence in Visual Arts and Education.

Other awards he received in recent years include the International Society of Experimental Artists Award, the HK Holbein Artist Award, the Isabey/Savoir-Faire Award, the Frame Destination Award at the National Watercolor Society 100th International Exhibition in San Pedro, CA (USA, 2020), Artistic Excellence Special Award at the Missouri International Watercolor Exhibition (USA/Spain, 2020), Special Mention Award at the 6th Biennial Fabriano Watercolour Prize (Italy, 2020), Second Award at the National Biennial Art Exhibition, Visual Arts Center, Punta Gorda, FL (2012), and the First Prize at the 42nd Rocky Mountain National Watermedia Exhibition, Foothills Art Center, Golden, CO (2015).

== Gallery ==
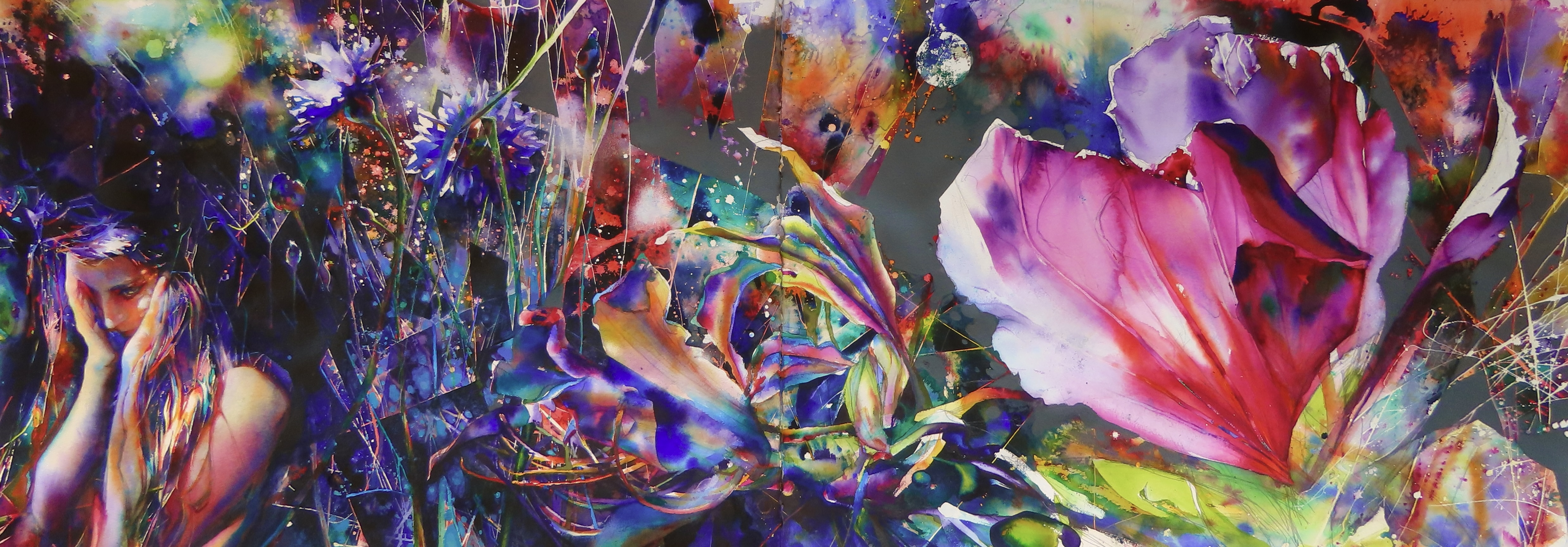
"Path of Light", 2024, watermedia, 29.5” x 83”
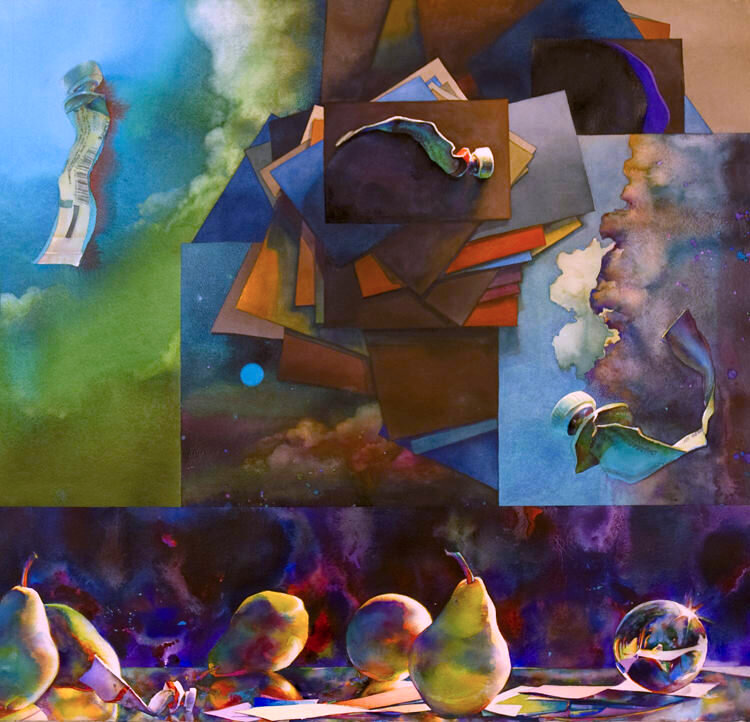
"Flying World", 33" x 34.75", watercolor, 2009 (private collection)

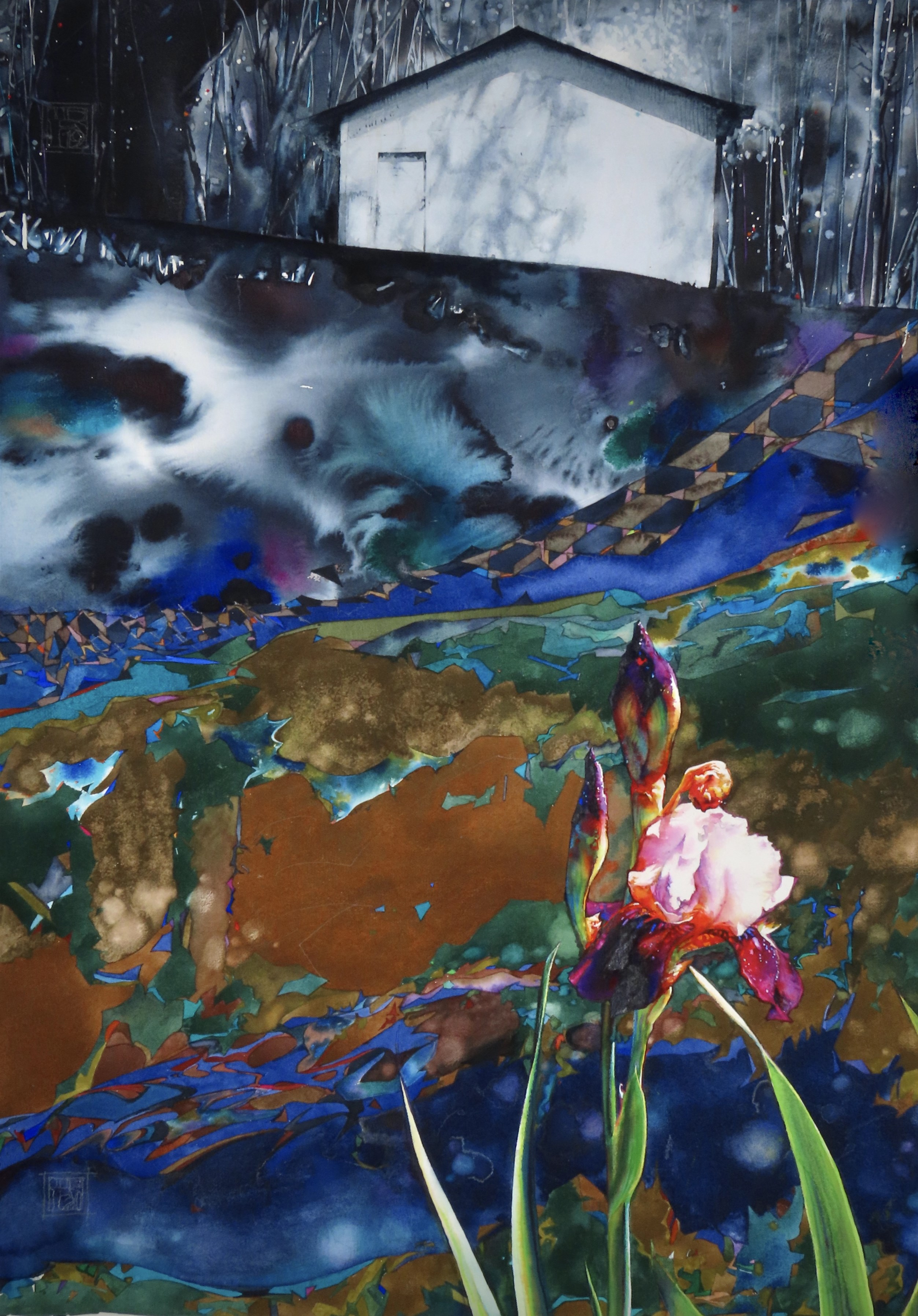
"From Who I Am to Where I Am Going",41.5" x 29", watercolor, 2020 (private collection)

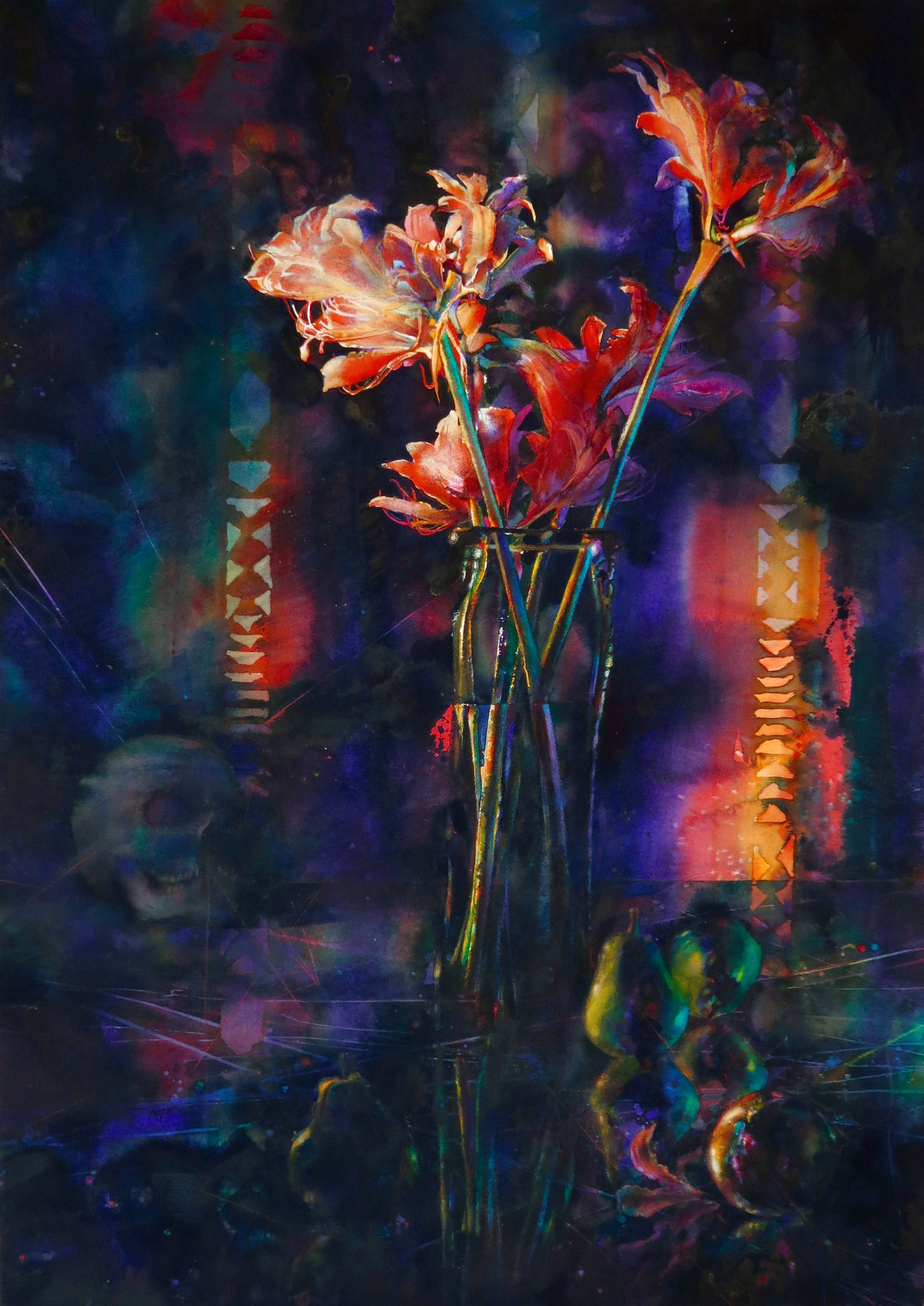
"Anteroom", 41.5" x 29", watercolor, 2020 (private collection)
