= List of dance personalities =

This is a list of people involved in dance.

== Alphabetical ==
=== A ===
- Eleonora Abbagnato - Italian ballet dancer
- Stella Abrera - Filipino-American ballet dancer
- Carlos Acosta - Cuban ballet dancer and artistic director of Birmingham Royal Ballet
- Precious Adams - American ballet dancer
- Carolina Agüero - Argentine ballet dancer
- Joo Won Ahn - South Korean ballet dancer
- Alvin Ailey - modern choreographer
- Heléne Alexopoulos - American ballet dancer
- Alicia Alonso - Cuban prima ballerina assoluta
- Alicia Amatriain - Spanish ballet dancer
- Carmen Amaya - Spanish flamenco dancer and singer
- Dores André - Spanish ballet dancer
- Elena Andreianova - considered the outstanding Russian ballerina of the romantic genre
- Gasparo Angiolini - Italian ballet dancer, choreographer and theoretician
- Ann-Margret (no surname) - Swedish-American dancer, actress, and singer in films; Viva Las Vegas
- Aesha Ash - American ballet dancer
- Merrill Ashley - American ballet dancer
- Frederick Ashton - British ballet dancer and choreographer
- Charles Askegard - American ballet dancer
- Adele Astaire - American Broadway dancer and singer; Fred Astaire's dance partner, 1905–1931
- Fred Astaire - American film and Broadway dancer, choreographer, singer and actor
- Daniela Avanzini - American dancer and singer
- Gary Avis - British ballet dancer
- Silvia Azzoni - Italian ballet dancer

=== B ===
- Elisa Badenes - Spanish ballet dancer
- George Balanchine - Georgian-American choreographer credited for bridging classical and modern ballet
- Caroline Baldwin (born 1990) - American ballet dancer
- Matthew Ball - British ballet dancer
- Shirley Ballas - British Latin dancer and TV presenter
- Dominika Banevič - Lithuanian breakdancer
- Ashley Banjo - British street dancer, choreographer and leader of Diversity
- Marie Barch (1744–1827) - Danish ballerina
- Liberty Barros - British yoga dancer
- Aszure Barton - Canadian choreographer
- Mikhail Baryshnikov - Russian ballet dancer
- Léonore Baulac - French ballet dancer
- Vytautas Beliajus - Lithuanian-American, considered the father of international folk dance
- Jérémie Bélingard - French ballet dancer
- Aran Bell - American ballet dancer
- Leanne Benjamin - Australian ballet dancer
- Hanna Berger - German-Austrian dancer and resistance fighter
- Hannelore Bey - German ballet dancer
- Inci Birol - Turkish belly dancer and actress
- Joan Boada - Cuban ballet dancer
- Gertrud Bodenwieser - Austrian dancer, choreographer, dance teacher and pioneer of modern dance
- Roberto Bolle - Italian ballet dancer
- Julio Bocca - Argentine ballet dancer
- Roberto Bolle - Italian ballet dancer
- Federico Bonelli - Italian ballet dancer
- Hélène Bouchet - French ballet dancer
- Ashley Bouder - American ballet dancer
- Antoine Bournonville - French ballet dancer
- August Bournonville - Danish ballet dancer and choreographer
- Julie Bournonville - ballet dancer
- Sofia Boutella - Algerian hip hop dancer
- Kent Boyd - American teen dancing sensation; runner-up of Season 7 of So You Think You Can Dance; contemporary jazz, Broadway
- Isabella Boylston - American ballet dancer
- Skylar Brandt - American ballet dancer
- James Brown - African American dancer, entertainer, singer, musician and songwriter
- Erik Bruhn - Danish ballet dancer and choreographer
- Stéphane Bullion - French ballet dancer
- Cheryl Burke - American ballroom and Latin dancer
- Darcey Bussell - British ballet dancer and TV presenter
- Dany Bustros - Lebanese belly dancer
- Nadiya Bychkova - Ukrainian ballroom dancer

=== C ===
- Elisa Carrillo Cabrera - Mexican ballet dancer
- Flavia Cacace - Italian and British ballroom dancer
- Rita Cadillac - Brazilian dancer and singer
- Maria Calegari - American ballet dancer
- Claire Calvert - British ballet dancer
- Alexander Campbell - Australian ballet dancer
- Elisa Cansino - Spanish flamenco dancer
- Leslie Caron - French-born ballet dancer and American film actress
- José Manuel Carreño - Cuban ballet dancer
- Yvonne Cartier - British ballet dancer, mime and teacher
- Kamilla Carvalho - Brazilian samba dancer
- Irene Castle - British-American ballroom dancer
- Vernon Castle - British-American ballroom dancer
- Vakhtang Chabukiani - Georgian ballet dancer
- Guru Chandrasekharan - Indian dancer
- Cyd Charisse - American ballet and film dancer
- Si-Lan Chen - Chinese-Trinidadian dancer
- Sun Chen - Taiwanese breakdancer
- Sidi Larbi Cherkaoui - Belgian choreographer, artistic director of Royal Ballet of Flanders
- Sophie Chevigny - French ballet dancer
- Yuhui Choe - Korean ballet dancer
- Frances Chung - Canadian ballet dancer
- Jeffrey Cirio - American ballet dancer
- Lia Cirio - American ballet dancer
- The Clark Brothers - American tap dancers
- Joanne Clifton - British ballroom dancer
- Kevin Clifton - British ballroom dancer
- Alina Cojocaru - Romanian ballet dancer
- Valentine Colasante - French ballet dancer
- Deborah Colker - Brazilian writer, theater director, dancer and choreographer
- Calico Cooper - American actress, dancer, and singer daughter of Alice and Sheryl Cooper
- Sheryl Cooper - American dancer and dance instructor, wife of Alice Cooper and mother of Calico Cooper
- Jonathan Cope - British ballet dancer
- Misty Copeland - American ballet dancer
- Bernice Coppieters - Belgian ballet dancer
- Vito Coppola - Italian ballroom dancer
- Jean Coralli - French ballet dancer and choreographer
- Angel Corella - Spanish premier danseur
- Erica Cornejo - Argentine ballet dancer
- Herman Cornejo - Argentine ballet dancer
- Cesar Corrales - Canadian ballet dancer
- Joaquín Cortés - Spanish ballet dancer and choreographer
- Guillaume Côté - Canadian ballet dancer and choreographer
- J'aime Crandall - American ballet dancer
- John Cranko - South African ballet dancer and choreographer
- Dick Crum - American prominent folk dance teacher
- Isabella Cubas - Spanish dancer
- Merce Cunningham - American choreographer
- Lauren Cuthbertson - English ballet dancer
- Nicole Cutler - South African ballroom dancer

=== D ===
- Sophie Daguin - ballet mistress and ballerina
- Dan Dailey - American film actor and dancer
- Dalilah - Spanish belly dancer
- Camilla Dallerup - Danish ballroom dancer
- Jean Dauberval - French dancer and choreographer
- Shiamak Davar - Indian choreographer
- Sibéal Davitt - Irish sean-nós dancer
- David Dawson - British choreographer
- Igone de Jongh - Dutch ballet dancer
- Anne Teresa De Keersmaeker - choreographer
- Sasha De Sola - American ballet dancer
- Dame Ninette de Valois - Irish dancer, founder of the Royal Ballet of London
- Louis Deland - ballet master, ballet dancer, choreographer
- Patricia Delgado - American ballet dancer, répétiteur and teacher
- Michaela DePrince - Sierra Leonean-American ballet dancer
- Gaby Deslys - French ballroom dancer and actress
- Prabhu Deva - Indian dancer and choreographer
- Julie Diana - American ballet dancer, ballet master, writer and arts administrator
- Charles-Louis Didelot - French dancer and choreographer
- Aurelia Dimier - French baller dancer
- Dina - Egyptian belly dancer and actress
- Anton Dolin - British ballet dancer and choreographer
- Holly Dorger - American ballet dancer
- Amy Dowden - British ballroom dancer
- Anthony Dowell - British ballet dancer and choreographer
- Joanne Doyle - Irish performer of Irish dance
- Jurgita Dronina - Russian-Lithuanian ballet dancer
- Remo D'Souza - Indian Bollywood choreographer
- Tabitha and Napoleon D'umo a.k.a. "Nappytabs" - dance teachers, choreographers, and creative directors
- Anton Du Beke - British ballroom dancer and TV presenter
- Isadora Duncan - American dancer, "mother of modern dance"
- Katherine Dunham - American pioneer of black dance, anthropologist, choreographer, creator of the Dunham Technique
- Colin Dunne - Irish performer of Irish dance
- Aurélie Dupont - French ballet dancer and artistic director of Paris Opera Ballet
- Irina Dvorovenko - Ukrainian-American ballet dancer

=== E ===
- Madeleine Eastoe - Australian ballet dancer
- Julia Edwards - Trinidadian dancer and choreographer
- Andre Eglevsky - Russian-American ballet dancer and teacher; performed in Charles Chaplin's film Limelight
- Alexander Ekman - Swedish choreographer
- Jorma Elo - Finnish choreographer
- Fanny Elssler - Austrian ballet dancer and actress
- Sorella Englund - Finnish ballet dancer
- Merche Esmeralda - Spanish flamenco dancer

=== F ===
- Adolfina Fägerstedt - Swedish ballerina
- Hekmet Fahmy - Egyptian belly dancer and actress
- Robert Fairchild - American ballet dancer and actor
- Silas Farley - American ballet dancer, choreographer and educator
- Suzanne Farrell - American ballet dancer
- Jane Farwell - American folk dance teacher
- Marie Favart - French ballet dancer
- Lorena Feijóo - Cuban ballet dancer
- Lorna Feijóo - Cuban ballet dancer
- Jairo Barrull Fernández - Spanish flamenco dancer
- Marcelo Ferreira - Brazilian dancer and choreographer
- Alessandra Ferri - Italian prima ballerina assoluta
- Graciela Figueroa - Uruguayan dancer and choreographer
- Michael Flatley - American step dancer
- Bernadette Flynn - Irish performer of Irish dance
- Nikisha Fogo - Swedish ballet dancer
- Michel Fokine - Russian choreographer
- Margot Fonteyn - British ballerina and assoluta
- Thomas Forster - British ballet dancer
- Bob Fosse - American dancer and musical theater choreographer
- Nagwa Fouad - Egyptian belly dancer
- Celia Franca - British ballet dancer, co-founder of the National Ballet of Canada
- Alina Frasa - Finnish ballet dancer and choreographer
- Francesco Gabriele Frola - Italian ballet dancer
- Anine Frölich - Danish ballerina
- Fujiko Fujima - Japanese dancer
- Jovani Furlan - Brazilian ballet dancer
- Anzu Furukawa - Japanese butoh dancer

=== G ===
- Mara Galeazzi - Italian ballet dancer
- Louis Gallodier - ballet master and choreographer
- Mathieu Ganio - French ballet dancer
- Gonzalo Garcia - Spanish ballet dancer
- Daniel Gaudiello - Australian ballet dancer
- Asen Gavrilov - Bulgarian ballet dancer and choreographer
- Mitzi Gaynor - American film actress and dancer
- Gisa Geert - Austrian actress and choreographer
- Yekaterina Geltzer - prima ballerina of the Bolshoi in the 1910s and 1920s
- Adeline Genée - Danish ballet dancer
- Angelica Generosa - American ballet dancer
- Yvonne Georgi - German ballet dancer
- Elizaveta Gerdt - Russian dancer and teacher
- Pavel Gerdt - "Prince of the St Petersburg stage"
- Dorothée Gilbert - French ballet dancer
- Marie-Agnès Gillot - French ballet dancer and choreographer
- Ailes Gilmour - early Martha Graham dancer, socialist activist, and sister of Isamu Noguchi
- Céline Gittens - Trinidadian ballet dancer
- Alexander Godunov - Russian dancer who defected to the West
- Matthew Golding - Canadian ballet dancer
- Jeffrey Golladay - American ballet dancer
- Chantal Gondang - Cameroonian dancer and choreographer
- Chachi Gonzales - American hip-hop dancer
- Len Goodman - British ballroom dancer and TV presenter
- Betty Grable - American film actress and dancer
- Alicia Graf Mack - American dancer
- Martha Graham - American dancer and choreographer
- Carolina Granberg - Swedish ballerina
- Yury Grigorovich - Russian dancer, choreographer and artistic director
- Fabio Grossi - Italian ballet dancer
- Victor Gsovsky - Russian ballet dancer and choreographer
- Carlos Gu - Chinese ballroom dancer
- Sylvie Guillem - French ballet dancer
- Martha Gularte - Uruguayan candombe dancer, poet and vedette
- Erdem Gündüz - Turkish dancer
- Yolanda Gutiérrez - Mexican and German dancer and artist

=== H ===
- Craig Hall - American ballet dancer
- David Hallberg - American ballet dancer
- Anna Halprin - American postmodern dancer and teacher
- Melissa Hamilton - Irish ballet dancer
- MC Hammer - American hip hop dancer, rapper and choreographer
- Christopher Hampson - English ballet dancer and choreographer, artistic director of Scottish Ballet
- Mata Hari - Dutch born dancer, courtesan and alleged spy
- Evelyn Hart - Canadian ballet dancer
- Karen Hauer - Venezuelan–American ballroom dancer
- Sarah Hay - American actress and ballet dancer
- Francesca Hayward - British ballet dancer
- Rita Hayworth - American film dancer and actress
- Robert Helpmann - Australian ballet dancer
- Susan Hendl - American ballet dancer and répétiteur
- Robyn Hendricks - South African ballet dancer
- Heike Hennig - German dancer and choreographer
- Audrey Hepburn - British ballerina and movie star
- Isaac Hernández - Mexican ballet dancer
- Paloma Herrera - Argentine ballet dancer and artistic director of Colon Theater Ballet
- Laurent Hilaire - French ballet dancer, ballet master and associate director of the Paris Opera Ballet
- Michaela Hinds - Canadian performer of Irish dance
- Ryoichi Hirano - Japanese ballet dancer
- Hedda Hjortsberg - Swedish ballet dancer
- Greta Hodgkinson - American-Canadian ballet dancer
- Hilde Holger - Austro-British expressionist dancer, choreographer, and pioneer of physically integrated dance
- Anna Sophia Holmstedt - Swedish ballet dancer
- Melissa Hough - American ballet dancer
- Dulcie Howes - South African ballet dancer and founder of Cape Town City Ballet
- Nikolaj Hübbe - Danish ballet dancer, artistic director of Royal Danish Ballet
- Catherine Hurlin - American ballet dancer
- Sterling Hyltin - American ballet dancer

=== I ===
- Carrie Imler - American ballet dancer

=== J ===
- Janet Jackson - American dancer, choreographer, actor and singer
- Kevin Jackson - Australian ballet dancer
- Michael Jackson - American dancer, choreographer, singer and entertainer
- Rowena Jackson - New Zealand prima ballerina of the Royal Ballet
- Drew Jacoby - American contemporary ballet dancer
- Zizi Jeanmaire - French ballet dancer
- Whitney Jensen - American ballet dancer
- Quina Jiménez - Spanish flamenco dancer
- Lana Jones - Australian ballet dancer
- Neil Jones - British ballroom dancer
- Jadvyga Jovaišaitė - Lithuanian ballet dancer
- Raghav Juyal - Indian dancer and choreographer, known for his slo-motion dance style

=== K ===
- Karen Kain - Canadian prima ballerina
- Yuriko Kajiya - Japanese ballet dancer
- Fumi Kaneko - Japanese ballet dancer
- Kang Sue-jin - Korean ballet dancer
- Vera Karalli - Russian ballet dancer and actress
- Bernara Karieva - Uzbek ballerina
- Gene Kelly - American film and stage dancer, choreographer, singer, actor and film director
- Julie Kent - American ballet dancer and artistic director of The Washington Ballet
- Akram Khan - British dancer and choreographer
- Farah Khan - Indian Bollywood choreographer and filmmaker
- Saroj Khan - Indian Bollywood choreographer
- Michael Kidd - American Broadway and film choreographer and dancer
- Perri Kiely - British street dancer
- Philip Kim - Canadian breakdancer
- Ty King-Wall - New Zealand ballet dancer
- Gelsey Kirkland - former legendary American Ballet Theatre and Principal dancer with the New York City Ballet
- Nehemiah Kish - American ballet dancer
- Daria Klimentová - Czech ballet dancer, teacher and photographer
- Hikaru Kobayashi - Japanese ballet dancer
- Maria Kochetkova - Russian ballet dancer
- Ako Kondo - Japanese ballet dancer
- Manlee Kongprapad - Thai dancer
- Carla Körbes - Brazilian ballet dancer
- Maria Kowroski - American ballet dancer
- Gertrud Kraus - Israeli pioneer of modern dance
- Rebecca Krohn - American ballet dancer
- Mathilde Kschessinska - Russian ballet dancer, second prima ballerina assoluta
- Misa Kuranaga - Japanese ballet dancer
- Stephanie Kurlow - Australian ballet dancer, first Hijabi ballerina
- Nikita Kuzmin - Ukrainian ballroom dancer
- Jiří Kylián - Czech choreographer

=== L ===
- Rudolf Laban - Austro-Hungarian choreographer, inventor of Labanotation
- Lucia Lacarra - Spanish ballet dancer
- Eddie Ladd - Welsh physical theatre performer and dancer
- Sarah Lamb - American ballet dancer
- Jean-Baptiste Landé - French ballet dancer, founder of the Russian ballet
- Sarah Lane - American ballet dancer
- Nicolas Le Riche - French ballet dancer and choreographer
- Tina LeBlanc - American ballet dancer, teacher and ballet master
- Louise Lecavalier - Canadian contemporary dancer
- Douglas Lee - British ballet dancer and choreographer
- Leejung Lee - South Korean dancer and choreographer
- Lee Lee Lan - Malaysian ballet dancer and choreographer
- Kai Leete - Estonian ballet and folk dancer
- Pierina Legnani - first prima ballerina assoluta
- Manuel Legris - French ballet dancer and artistic director of Vienna State Ballet
- Sara Leland - American ballet dancer and répétiteur
- Alban Lendorf - Danish ballet dancer
- Lawrence Leritz - American dancer and choreographer
- Agnès Letestu - French ballet dancer
- Tracy Li - Chinese ballet dancer; a senior principal in the Cape Town City Ballet, South Africa
- Edwaard Liang - Taiwanese-born American dancer and choreographer
- Serge Lifar - Ukrainian ballet dancer and choreographer
- Maude Lloyd - South African ballerina and dance critic
- Elena Lobsanova - Russian-Canadian ballet dancer
- Jennifer Lopez - American (Puerto Rican descent) dancer, singer and actress
- Annabelle Lopez Ochoa - Belgian choreographer
- Lydia Lopokova - Russian ballet dancer
- Lauren Lovette - American ballet dancer and choreographer
- Svetlana Lunkina - Russian ballet dancer

=== M ===
- Motsi Mabuse - South African dancer and TV presenter
- Oti Mabuse - South African dancer
- Brooklyn Mack - American ballet dancer
- Mayara Magri - Brazilian ballet dancer
- Shantanu Maheshwari - Indian dancer, choreographer and actor
- Natascha Mair - Austrian ballet dancer
- Natalia Makarova - Russian ballet dancer
- David Makhateli - Georgian ballet dancer
- Maia Makhateli - Georgian ballet dancer
- Marianna Malińska - Polish ballet dancer
- Hugo Marchand - French ballet dancer
- Paul Marque - French ballet dancer
- Roberta Marquez - Brazilian ballet dancer
- Cathy Marston - British choreographer
- Sophie Martin - French ballet dancer
- Badia Masabni - Lebanese belly dancer
- José Martínez - Spanish ballet dancer
- Kizzy Matiakis - English ballet dancer
- William Matons - WPA-era, 1930s modern dancer and choreographer, known later during Calypso craze as Calypso Joe, and later as General Hershy Bar
- Sabrina Matthews - Canadian ballet choreographer and former ballet dancer
- Kay Mazzo - American ballet dancer and educator, Chairman of Faculty of School of American Ballet
- David McAllister - Australian ballet dancer, former artistic director of The Australian Ballet
- Elizabeth McGorian - Zimbabwean ballerina
- Wayne McGregor - British choreographer
- Trey McIntyre - American dancer and choreographer
- Amanda McKerrow - American ballet dancer
- Rachael McLaren - Canadian dancer
- Steven McRae - Australian ballet dancer
- Tate McRae - first-ever Canadian finalist in So You Think You Can Dance
- Sara Mearns - American ballet dancer
- Vrushika Mehta - Indian contemporary dancer and television actress
- Itziar Mendizabal - Spanish ballet dancer
- Sulamith Messerer - founder of Japanese ballet
- Jo Mihaly - German dancer and writer
- Ann Miller - American tap dancer, singer, and actress, especially in films
- Kunduz Mirkarimova - Uzbek dancer
- Arthur Mitchell - American artistic director, educator, choreographer and dancer
- Shakti Mohan - Indian contemporary dancer and winner of Dance India Dance 2
- Baisali Mohanty - Indian classical dancer and choreographer
- Victor Montalvo - American breakdancer
- Louis-Stanislas Montjoie - French ballet dancer
- Pippa Moore - English ballet dancer
- Marcelly Morena - Brazilian samba dancer and singer
- Laura Morera - Spanish ballet dancer
- Kathryn Morgan - American ballet dancer and YouTuber
- Keo Motsepe - South African ballroom dancer
- Mary Ellen Moylan - American ballet dancer
- Hope Muir - Canadian dancer, artistic director of National Ballet of Canada, former artistic director of Charlotte Ballet
- Vadim Muntagirov - Russian ballet dancer
- Gillian Murphy - American ballet dancer
- Graeme Murphy - Australian choreographer
- Arthur Murray - American dance instructor and businessman, known for the Arthur Murray Dance Studios franchise

=== N ===
- Yasmine Naghdi - British ballet dancer
- Vilma Nascimento - Brazilian samba dancer
- Gene Nelson - American film dancer, actor and television director
- Nadia Nerina - South African ballet dancer
- John Neumeier - American choreographer, artistic director of Hamburg Ballet
- Nicholas Brothers - African American dancing brothers (Fayard and Harold) known for their acrobatic techniques
- Kyra Nichols - American ballet dancer and teacher
- Vaslav Nijinsky - Russian ballet dancer and choreographer
- Nikolina Nikoleski - Croatian teacher and choreographer of Bharatnatyam
- Ena Noël - Australian children's author and ballet dancer
- Daire Nolan - Irish performer of Irish dance
- Charlotta Norberg - Swedish ballet dancer
- Siphesihle November - South African ballet dancer
- Ivan Novikoff - Russian ballet master, founder of Novikoff School of Russian-American Ballet
- Marianela Nuñez - Argentine-British ballet dancer
- Rudolf Nureyev - Russian ballet dancer
- Mamela Nyamza - South African dancer, choreographer and activist

=== O ===
- Agnes Oaks - Estonian ballet dancer
- Donald O'Connor - American dancer, singer and actor
- Heather Ogden - Canadian ballet dancer
- Kazuo Ohno - Japanese butoh dancer
- Fernanda Oliveira - Brazilian ballet dancer
- Jonathan Ollivier - British ballet dancer
- Zeinat Olwi - Egyptian belly dancer
- Hannah O'Neill - New Zealand ballet dancer
- Simona Orinska - Latvian multidisciplinary artist, contemporary dancer, poet, choreographer and practitioner of dance therapy
- Julia O'Rourke - Irish step dancer
- Carlos Orta - Venezuelan dancer
- Nancy Osbaldeston - English ballet dancer
- Natalia Osipova - Russian ballet dancer
- Sonia Osorio - Ballet de Colombia founder
- Clairemarie Osta - French ballet dancer
- Anna Rose O'Sullivan - British ballet dancer

=== P ===
- Stephen Page - Australian choreographer, artistic director of Bangarra Dance Theatre
- Ludmila Pagliero - Argentine ballet dancer
- Maria Palmer - Austrian-born American actress and dancer
- Hermes Pan - film choreographer, especially in collaboration with Fred Astaire
- Noelani Pantastico - American ballet dancer
- Merle Park - Zimbabwean ballerina at the Royal Ballet
- Sae Eun Park - South Korean ballet dancer
- Georgina Parkinson - English ballet dancer and ballet mistress
- Veronika Part - Russian ballet dancer
- Cathy Patra - Ugandan dancer
- Alexandre Paulikevitch - Lebanese belly dancer
- Anna Pavlova - Russian prima ballerina, who brought ballet to the world
- Georgina Pazcoguin - American ballet dancer
- Justin Peck - American ballet dancer and choreographer
- Tiler Peck - American ballet dancer
- Rupert Pennefather - British ballet dancer
- Tina Pereira - Trinidadian-Canadian ballet dancer
- Rosie Perez - American (Afro-Puerto Rican descent) dancer, choreographer, actress and director
- Giovanni Pernice - Italian ballroom dancer
- Jules Perrot - French ballet dancer and choreographer
- Marius Petipa - choreographer who created the classical ballet
- Vilhelm Pettersson - Swedish ballet dancer
- Unity Phelan - American ballet dancer
- Juanita Pitts - African-American tap dancer
- Maya Plisetskaya - prima ballerina assoluta of the Bolshoi Ballet from 1960 to 1990
- David Poole - South African ballet dancer and ballet master at Cape Town City Ballet
- Eleanor Powell - American actress and dancer of the 1930s and 1940s, known for her exuberant solo tap dancing
- Ida Praetorius - Danish ballet dancer
- Angelin Preljocaj - French dancer and choreographer
- Olga Preobrajenska - Russian dancer and teacher
- Juliet Prowse - South African-American dancer, actress, and singer in films
- Jowita Przystał - Polish ballroom dancer
- Laetitia Pujol - French ballet dancer
- Brian Puspos - American hip-hop dancer, choreographer

=== Q ===
- Liu Qingyi - Chinese breakdancer

=== R ===
- Johannes Radebe - South African ballroom dancer
- Sascha Radetsky - American ballet dancer and artistic director of American Ballet Theatre Studio Company
- Samantha Raine - British ballet dancer and ballet mistress
- Daniel Rajna - South African ballet dancer, currently a principal in the Cape Town City Ballet
- Tina Ramirez - founder and artistic director of Ballet Hispanico
- Teresa Reichlen - American ballet dancer
- Alice Renavand - French ballet dancer
- Dwight Rhoden - American choreographer, artistic director of Complexions Contemporary Ballet
- Moon Ribas - Spanish choreographer with a cybernetic sensor attached to her body that allows her to feel earthquakes
- María Noel Riccetto - Uruguayan ballet dancer
- Jenifer Ringer - American ballet dancer and teacher
- Jerome Robbins - American choreographer
- Flor de María Rodríguez - Uruguayan ballet dancer and choreographer
- Nereyda Rodríguez - Dominican folklorist and dancer
- Sonia Rodriguez - Canadian ballet dancer
- Zhandra Rodríguez - Venezuelan prima ballerina
- Ginger Rogers - American film and stage dancer, singer and actress, most remembered as partner of Fred Astaire
- Tamara Rojo - Spanish ballet dancer and artistic director of English National Ballet
- Pedro Romeiras - Portuguese ballet dancer
- Custodia Romero - Spanish flamenco dancer and actress
- Gunhild Rosén - Swedish ballerina, ballet master and choreographer
- Danielle Rowe - Australian ballet dancer and choreographer
- Calvin Royal III - American ballet dancer

=== S ===
- Ruth St. Denis - American dancer who tried to fuse modern dance with Egyptian and east Asian ideas in collaboration with her partner Ted Shawn
- Stephanie Saland - American ballet dancer and teacher
- Saleem (Saleem Azzouqa) - American playwright, actor, DJ, and dancer
- Iana Salenko - Ukrainian-German ballet dancer
- Marcelino Sambé - Portuguese ballet dancer
- Olga Sandberg - Swedish ballerina
- Hester Santlow - British ballet dancer and actress
- Margrethe Schall - Danish ballet dancer
- Silja Schandorff - Danish ballet dancer
- Amanda Schull - American actress and ballet dancer
- Amber Scott - Australian ballet dancer
- Oh Sehun - South Korean dancer and member of EXO
- Anders Selinder - ballet master and choreographer
- Polina Semionova - Russian ballet dancer
- Hee Seo - South Korean ballet dancer
- Ciara Sexton - British professional Irish dancer
- Lynn Seymour - Canadian ballet dancer
- Uday Shankar - Indian pioneer of modern dance in India
- Ted Shawn - American ballet dancer often in collaboration with his influential partner Ruth St. Denis; they were the creators of Denishawn
- Moira Shearer - Scottish ballet dancer and actress in The Red Shoes
- Fang-Yi Sheu - Taiwanese dancer
- Shobana - Indian Bharatanatyam dancer
- Ingrid Silva - Brazilian ballet dancer
- Daniil Simkin - Russian-German ballet dancer
- Vincent Simone - Italian ballroom dancer
- Mary Skeaping - British ballerina
- Megan Skiendiel - American dancer and singer
- Wayne Sleep - British ballet dancer and TV personality
- Charlotte Slottsberg - Swedish ballet dancer
- Damian Smith - Australian ballet dancer
- Paew Snidvongseni - Thai dancer
- Thiago Soares - Brazilian ballet dancer
- Yuri Soloviev - soloist of the Kirov Theatre
- Jennie Somogyi - American ballet dancer
- Helene Spilling - Norwegian dancer and TV personality
- Phyllis Spira-Boyd - South African ballet dancer
- Abi Stafford - American ballet dancer
- Jonathan Stafford - American ballet dancer and artistic director of New York City Ballet
- Taylor Stanley - American ballet dancer
- Cory Stearns - American ballet dancer
- Lisa Steier - Swedish ballerina
- Dana Stephensen - Australian ballet dancer
- Ethan Stiefel - American ballet dancer and choreographer
- Beatriz Stix-Brunell - American ballet dancer
- Madoka Sugai - Japanese ballet dancer
- Amie Sultan - Egyptian belly dancer
- Laurretta Summerscales - British ballet dancer
- Sofiane Sylve - French ballet dancer

=== T ===
- Marie Taglioni - Italian ballet dancer
- Akane Takada - Japanese ballet dancer
- Erina Takahashi - Japanese ballet dancer
- Janie Taylor - American ballet dancer
- Paul Taylor - American choreographer
- Özcan Tekgül - Turkish dancer and actress
- Devon Teuscher - America ballet dancer
- Twyla Tharp - American dancer and choreographer
- Khánh Thi - Vietnamese dancer
- Emmanuel Thibault - French dancer, Paris Opera Ballet
- Fanny Thibout - Belgian dancer and folklorist known as the "grand dame" of Walloon folk dance
- Lisa Joann Thompson (born 1969) - Warrior Girl, Laker Girl, Fly Girl, and Motown Live dancer
- Helgi Tómasson - Icelandic ballet dancer and choreographer, artistic director of San Francisco Ballet
- Mark Tompkins (born 1954) - American-born French artist, dancer and choreographer of contemporary dance
- Nesrin Topkapı - Turkish belly dancer
- Tamara Toumanova - Georgian-American ballet dancer, one of Balanchine's three "Baby Ballerinas"
- Cassandra Trenary - American ballet dancer
- Elizabeth Triegaardt - South African ballerina and current director of Cape Town City Ballet
- Tsai Jui-yueh - Taiwanese dancer and choreographer
- Anna Tsygankova - Russian ballet dancer
- Roger Tully - British dancer and teacher
- Mukarram Turgunbaeva - Uzbek choreographer and dancer

=== U ===
- Galina Ulanova (1910–1998) - Soviet prima ballerina assoluta
- Eric Underwood - America British ballet dancer

=== V ===
- Agrippina Vaganova - Russian ballerina and ballet pedagogue, founder of Vaganova method
- Rudi van Dantzig - Dutch choreographer
- Hans van Manen - Dutch ballet dancer, choreographer and photographer
- Sarah Van Patten - American ballet dancer
- Jillian Vanstone - Canadian ballet dancer
- Angelita Vargas - Spanish flamenco dancer
- Francesca Velicu - Romanian ballet dancer
- Vera-Ellen - American Broadway and film dancer and actress
- Gwen Verdon - American Broadway dancer and actress
- Ben Vereen - American actor, dancer and singer
- Aliona Vilani - Russian-Kazakh ballroom dancer
- Friedemann Vogel - German ballet dancer
- Anastasia Volochkova - Russian prima ballerina

=== W ===
- Katita Waldo - Spanish ballet dancer and ballet master
- Peter Walker - American ballet dancer and choreographer
- Cilli Wang - Austrian-born Dutch dancer, performer and theater maker
- Seri Wangnaitham - Thai choreographer and dancer
- Esraa Warda - Algerian-American dancer
- Alexis Warr - American ballroom dancer
- Vincent Warren - American-born Canadian dancer, teacher, dance historian and lecturer
- Edward Watson - British ballet dancer
- Miranda Weese - American ballet dancer
- Stanton Welch - Australian ballet dancer and choreographer, artistic director of Houston Ballet
- Wen Hui - Chinese dancer and choreographer
- Christopher Wheeldon - British choreographer
- Wendy Whelan - American ballet dancer and associate artistic director of New York City Ballet
- James Whiteside - American ballet dancer
- Kai Widdrington - British ballroom dancer
- Robin Windsor - British ballroom dancer
- Joy Womack - American ballet dancer
- Peter Wright - British ballet dancer and choreographer
- Leni Wylliams - African-American dancer/choreographer/master-teacher

=== X ===
- Nancy Xu - Chinese ballroom dancer

=== Y ===
- Nadia Yanowsky - Spanish ballet dancer
- Yury Yanowsky - Spanish ballet dancer
- Zenaida Yanowsky - Spanish ballet dancer
- Lillian "Billie" Yarbo - American Broadway dancer and comedienne
- Veronica Yearwood - Antiguan choreographer and dance company founder
- Miyako Yoshida - Japanese ballet dancer
- Allen Yu - Taiwanese dancer and choreographer
- Nellie Yu Roung Ling - Chinese-American dancer
- Ami Yuasa - Japanese breakdancer

=== Z ===
- Vanessa Zahorian - American ballet dancer
- Soheir Zaki - Egyptian belly dancer and actress
- Oleksii Zhylenko - Ukrainian ballroom dancer
- Dona Zica - Brazilian samba dancer
- Maddie Ziegler - American dancer

== By occupation in ballet ==
=== Theatre directors ===
- Gerald Arpino
- Jean Dauberval
- Catherine de' Medici
- Ninette de Valois
- Robert de Warren
- Sergei Diaghilev
- Robert Joffrey
- Louis XIV
- Jean-Baptiste Lully
- Marie Rambert

=== Choreographers ===
- Sir Frederick Ashton
- George Balanchine
- Pierre Beauchamp
- Erik Bruhn
- John Cranko
- Peter Darrell
- Robert de Warren
- Mikhail Fokine
- William Forsythe
- Yury Grigorovich
- Lev Ivanovich Ivanov
- Serge Lifar
- Kenneth MacMillan
- Léonide Massine
- Sabrina Matthews
- Bronislava Nijinska
- Vaslav Nijinsky
- Jean-Georges Noverre
- Rudolf Nureyev
- Jules Perrot
- Marius Petipa
- Roland Petit
- Jerome Robbins
- Filippo Taglioni
- Antony Tudor

=== Dancers ===
- Carlos Acosta
- Alicia Alonso
- Ann-Margret
- Mikhail Baryshnikov
- Jérémie Bélingard
- Maxim Beloserkovsky
- Ashley Bouder
- Erik Bruhn
- Fernando Bujones
- Darcey Bussell
- Jennifer Butler
- Leslie Caron
- Jose Manuel Carreno
- Fanny Cerito
- Vakhtang Chabukiani
- Cyd Charisse
- Alina Cojocaru
- Angel Corella
- Joaquín De Luz
- Anton Dolin
- Aurelie Dupont
- Irina Dvorovenko
- Fanny Elssler
- Megan Fairchild
- Suzanne Farrell
- Alessandra Ferri
- Margot Fonteyn
- Yekaterina Geltzer
- Adeline Genée
- Pavel Gerdt
- Ailes Gilmour
- Jeffrey Golladay
- Marcelo Gomes
- Lucile Grahn
- Carlotta Grisi
- Fabio Grossi
- Sylvie Guillem
- Rex Harrington
- Evelyn Hart
- Melissa Hayden
- Paloma Herrera
- Laurent Hilaire
- Greta Hodgkinson
- Rowena Jackson
- Karen Kain
- Allegra Kent
- Julie Kent
- Darci Kistler
- Johan Kobborg
- Maria Kochetkova
- Maria Kowroski
- Mathilde Kschessinska
- Pierina Legnani
- Manuel Legris
- Lawrence Leritz
- Agnes Letestu
- Emma Livry
- Uliana Lopatkina
- Vladimir Malakhov
- Alicia Markova
- José Martínez
- Patricia McBride
- Gillian Murphy
- Peter Naumann
- Nadia Nerina
- Kyra Nichols
- Vaslav Nijinsky
- Marianela Nunez
- Rudolf Nureyev
- Anna Pavlova
- Élisabeth Platel
- Maya Plisetskaya
- Olga Preobrajenska
- Juliet Prowse
- Laetitia Pujol
- Rolando Sarabia
- Moira Shearer
- Yuri Soloviev
- Phyllis Spira
- Ethan Stiefel
- Sofiane Sylve
- Marie Taglioni
- Maria Tallchief
- Ludmilla Tchérina
- Emmanuel Thibault
- Galina Ulanova
- Auguste Vestris
- Gaetan Vestris
- Diana Vishneva
- Wendy Whelan
- Miyako Yoshida
- Svetlana Zakharova

=== Teachers ===
- Thoinot Arbeau
- Cyril Atanassoff
- George Balanchine
- Claude Bessy
- Pierre Beauchamp
- Carlo Blasis
- August Bournonville
- Enrico Cecchetti
- Domenico da Piacenza
- Raoul-Auger Feuillet
- Elisabeth Gerdt
- Rosella Hightower
- Stanley Holden
- Victor Kanevsky
- Gelsey Kirkland
- Attilio Labis
- Nicolai Legat
- Sulamith Messerer
- Peter Naumann
- Anna Pavlova
- Jules Perrot
- Olga Preobrajenska
- Roma Pryma-Bohachevsky
- Pierre Rameau
- Jerome Robbins
- Víctor Ullate
- Agrippina Vaganova
- Auguste Vestris
- Vera Volkova
- Stanley Williams

=== Designers and scenographers ===
- Léon Bakst
- Alexandre Benois
- Christian Bérard
- Georges Braque
- Marc Chagall
- John Craxton
- Salvador Dalí
- André Derain
- Barbara Karinska
- Barry Kay
- Pablo Picasso
- Pavel Tchelitchev
- Maurice Utrillo

== See also ==
- List of dancers
- List of female dancers
