= Golladay =

Golladay may refer to:

== People with the family name ==
- Edward Isaac Golladay (1830–1897), American politician from Tennessee.
- Jacob Golladay (1819–1887), American politician from Kentucky.
- Jeffrey Golladay (born 1979), American ballet dancer.
- Kenny Golladay (born 1993), American football wide receiver for the New York Giants of the National Football League.

== Location ==
- Golladay Hall, a historic mansion in Grenada, Mississippi, USA.
