= Ziba Aminzade =

Tajik ballet dancer and choreographer (born 1948)

Zebo Aminzoda
- Зебо Аминзода
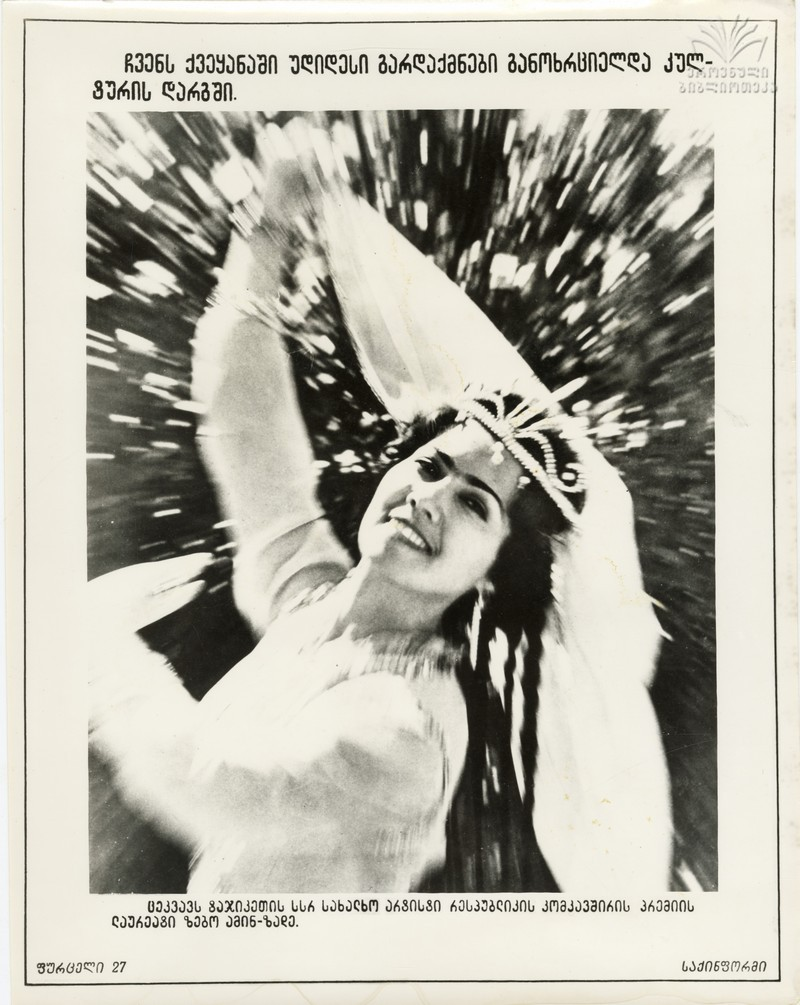
- Born: October 3, 1948; Dushanbe, Tajik SSR, Soviet Union
- Occupations: Ballet dancer, choreographer

Zebo Muhiddinovna Aminzoda (Note: Tajik: Зебо Муҳиддиновна Аминзода, romanized: Zebo Muḣiddinovna Aminzoda) (born October 3, 1948) is a Tajik ballet dancer and choreographer, active during the Soviet period and after.

== Life and career ==
Aminzoda is a native of Dushanbe, then called Stalinabad. She was born into an artistic family; her father was the poet Muhiddin Aminzoda, while she learned dance from her mother and grandmother. She studied dance under E. N. Zhemchuzhina at the Institute of Choreography at the Great Theater of the Soviet Union from 1958 until 1962; in that year she went to Tashkent, to work with Kunduz Mirkarimova at the division of popular dance at the Tashkent Institute of Choreography.

She remained at that institution until 1965, when she took a position with the company of the Pushkin Music and Comedy Theater in Khujand, then called Leninabad. In 1978 she left to become head of the Zebo Ensemble, a dance ensemble under the purview of the Committee for Tajik Radio and Television.

She was a vice-chairman of the Cabinet of Ministers of Tajikistan in 1993 and 1994; in the latter year she became her country's permanent representative at the Mir International Radio and Television Company in Moscow.

Aminzoda's choreography combines traditional elements with more modern staging and design. Her most notable dances included works with titles such as "Jonan", "Party", "Bell", "Sanam", "On the Meadow", "Midnight Prayer", and "Meeting". She also appeared in a number of plays during her career, including Tartuffe by Molière; a dramatization of the Ramayana by Natalya Romanovna Guseva; and The Gypsies by Alexander Pushkin.

She traveled widely during her career, and received a number of prizes, including the Lenin Komsomol Prize for Tajikistan in 1968, the Order of Lenin in 1970, the Jubilee Medal "In Commemoration of the 100th Anniversary of the Birth of Vladimir Ilyich Lenin", and the Order of the Red Banner of Labour. With her ensemble she was awarded the Lenin Komsomol Prize for the Soviet Union in 1982, and she was named a People's Artist of the USSR in 1986.
