= Dalilah (belly dancer) =

Spanish belly dancer

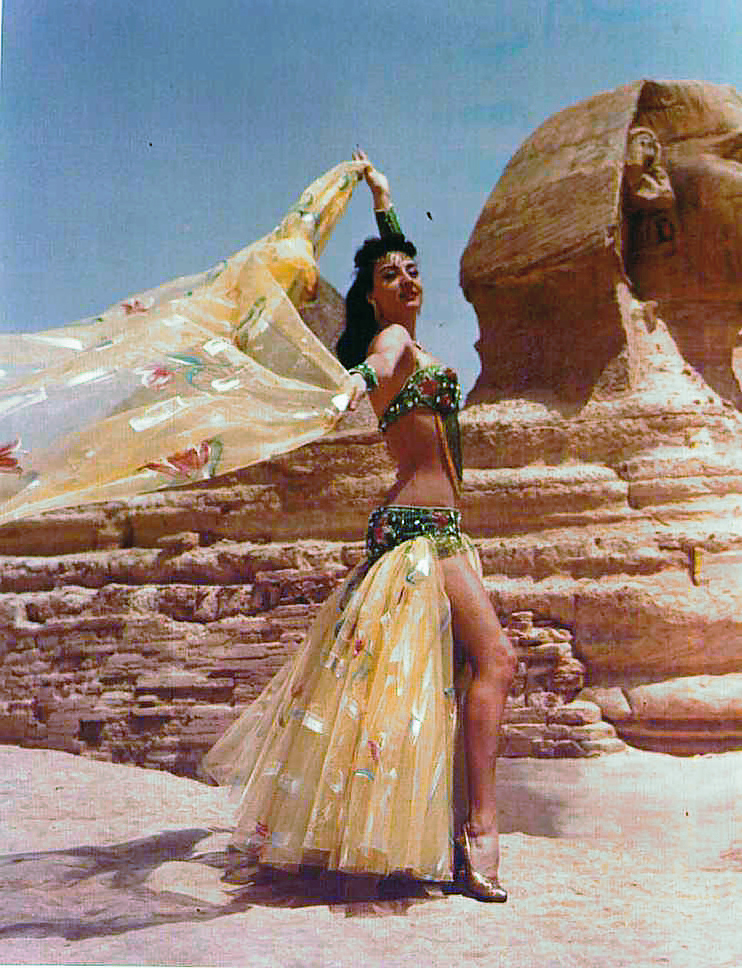
- Dalilah in front of the Sphinx
- Born: Adelaida Angulo Agramunt; 7 July 1936; Madrid, Spain
- Died: 17 September 2001 (aged 65); Madrid, Spain
- Other name: Delia Turina
- Occupations: Belly dancer, Flamenco dancer
- Spouse: Paul King

Dalilah (Arabic: دليلة, Dalīla) also Delia Turina (born as Adelaida Angulo Agramunt), (7 July 1936 – 17 September 2001) was a Spanish belly dancer.

== Career ==
From the age of 3 she began her career as a dancer with instructors like Miss Karen Taft (Ballet), La Quica and Regla Ortega (Flamenco), José Luis Udaeta (Spanish Classical Dance) and Luisa Perice (Bolero School).

In 1954, she traveled to Egypt for the first time with her Spanish dance partner Jose Molina. Entertaining on the same bill were Egyptian celebrities such as Samia Gamal, Nadia Gamal, Hoda Shams Eldin, Tahia Carioca and other dancing personalities performed. Due to artistic differences, the couple soon split. Overnight Dalilah found herself discovered and encouraged by the singer Wadih Al Safi, where she decided to give up her Spanish dancing career to follow the rhythms of the belly dance.

In 1959, Dalilah was chosen alongside Nagwa Fouad, as dancer of the year for the grand opening of the Nile Hilton in Cairo. Conrad Hilton flew in several Hollywood celebrities for the occasion, including Martha Hyer, Jane Russell and Van Johnson. During this era, she struggled with other native dancers, but had the privilege of being the protege of Tahia Carioca, who encouraged and helped her with her advice.

Dalilah was given the opportunity to perform for royalty throughout the Middle East (the Shah of Persia and Queen Soraya, King Farouk, King Hussein of Jordan, King Faisal of Saudi Arabia, the Sultan of Bahrain, and other personalities from politics as Nasser, Yugoslav president Marshal Josip Broz Tito and Lebanese President Camille Chamoun). After living in Egypt for several years, she traveled to Europe during the early 1960s, accompanied by her three piece Egyptian orchestra. Her popularity was such that during one of her visits to Italy, she was asked to perform at a private gathering held by Federico Fellini for his film “La dolce vita”.

After her European tour, she returned to Beirut to perform at the Hotel Phoenicia and the Casino du Liban, where she met her husband Paul King, a popular singer from London. War soon broke out in the Middle East and they were forced to leave, moving temporarily to Mexico.

In 1974, she moved to Las Vegas, Nevada, where she opened her dance studio and boutique. Over a ten-year period, she taught American audiences pure, authentic Egyptian oriental and folk dance. During this time, she invited Mahmoud Reda to the US for his first exposure to American audiences, and as a team, they conducted seminars and workshops from coast to coast to thousands of Americans.

Between 1977 and 1978, Dalilah organised along with the Egyptian Ministry of Culture “Belly dancers dream come true”, the very first ground-breaking belly dance tour to Cairo, where American women were offered authentic oriental dance and culture from both prominent contemporary dancers, as well as from legendary professionals such as Tahia Carioca, Soheir Zaki and Samia Gamal. These tours attracted plenty of media attention and were televised in the United States by the ABC 20/20 show.

In 1984, Dalilah retired to her home town of Madrid, Spain, where she found that belly dance had started to develop just after the rule of Franco. In 2000 she came back into the limelight to teach master classes, choreograph films, coach professionals and perform in a show called “Arabesque”. She died suddenly in 2001.

== Filmography ==
- Los ojos dejan huellas (Spain, 1952)
- Doña Francisquita (Spain, 1952)
- La alegre caravana (Spain, 1953)
- Alexander the Great (USA, 1955)
- Keyf Ansak (Egypt, 1957)
- Soutak (Lebanon, 1959)
- Juana la Loca (Spain, 2001) (final role)

== Television ==
- Dalilah Show (Lebanon 1959)
- Shoo Shoo Show Special (Lebanon 1959)
- Caterina Valenti Show (Finland 1963)
- Siempre en Domingo (Mexico 1972)
- Mike Douglas Show (USA 1976)
- Jerry Lewis Telethon (USA 1977)
- ABC 20/20 Show (USA 1977)
- Mundo Mundial. Canal Gran Vía (Spain 2001)
- Tele5 Nosolomúsica (Spain 2001) (final role)
