= Nikisha Fogo =

Swedish ballet dancer

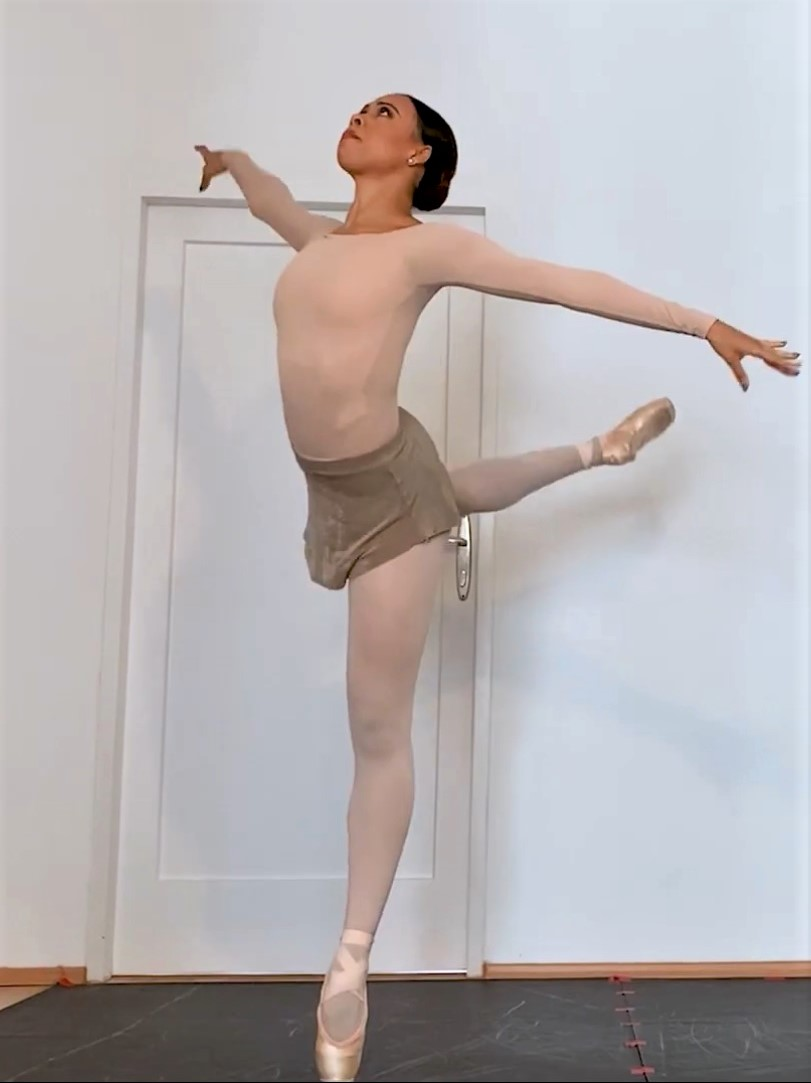
- Fogo dances for Swans for Relief in May 2020
- Born: 18 January 1995 (age 31); Stockholm, Sweden
- Education: Royal Swedish Ballet School; Royal Ballet School
- Occupation: Ballet dancer
- Career
- Current group: San Francisco Ballet
- Former groups: Vienna State Ballet

Nikisha Fogo (born 1995) is a Swedish ballet dancer who is currently a principal dancer with the San Francisco Ballet and previously a principal at the Vienna State Ballet.

== Early life ==
Nikisha Fogo was born in Stockholm. Her mother is Swedish, while her father was born in England to Jamaican parents. Her parents owned the first hip-hop dance school in Sweden, and she dabbled in different dance styles such as hip-hop, jazz, and tap. At age 10, she entered the Royal Swedish Ballet School. The following year, she auditioned for Talang 2007.

In 2011, shortly after she turned 16, Fogo competed at the Prix de Lausanne; though she did not make it into the finals or win any prize, she was offered several scholarships. She also met Gailene Stock, the director of The Royal Ballet School in London, who invited her to train in London. Fogo attended the school's second and third years of the Upper School, with a scholarship provided by Anglo-Swedish Society. She graduated in 2013.

== Career ==
Fogo joined the Vienna State Ballet in 2013. She was promoted to demi-soloist in 2015 and soloist the following year. As a soloist, she danced the principal role in Theme and Variations. In 2018, she was chosen to dance the title role in artistic director Manuel Legris's reconstruction of Sylvia, which was also Fogo's first full-length principal role. After the performance, Legris promoted Fogo to the rank of principal, the highest rank of the company. She went on to dance principal roles in other productions.

In 2020, it was announced that Fogo would join the San Francisco Ballet, after she had auditioned and took classes when the company was touring in London. Artistic Director Helgi Tomasson said Fogo "has everything I look for in a principal dancer — strong and versatile technique to excel in the classical and contemporary repertoire, beautiful musicality, and a profound desire to dance". Fogo said one of her reasons for leaving the Vienna State Ballet was Legris' departure from the company.

Fogo was originally scheduled to relocate to the U.S. in July but had to delay due to the COVID-19 pandemic. During this time she danced The Swan in Misty Copeland's fundraiser, Swans for Relief, a response to the pandemic's impact on the dance community, with funds going to participating dancers' companies and other related relief funds. She made her San Francisco Ballet debut at the virtual gala in January 2021 with Julian MacKay, also a new principal, and danced the White Swan Pas de Deux from Swan Lake and the Don Quixote Pas de Deux.

On colorism in ballet, Fogo, who identifies as mixed race/black, has called for better representation of black dancers, though she has said, "It's tricky: I feel really happy that I can represent for the brown ballerinas, but then I look at my skin and I'm the most pale person ever!"

== Selected repertoire ==
Fogo's repertoire with the San Francisco Ballet includes:

- A Midsummer Night’s Dream - George Balanchine (Titania, Hippolyta)
- Mere Mortals - Aszure Barton (Pandora)
- Emergence - Val Caniparoli (originated role)
- Blake Works I - William Forsythe
- Broken Wings - Annabelle Lopez Ochoa (Frida)
- Giselle - Helgi Tómasson (Myrtha)
- The Nutcracker - Tómasson (Sugar Plum Fairy, Grand Pas de deux)
- Romeo & Juliet - Tómasson (Juliet)
- Swan Lake - Tómasson (Odette/Odile)
- Diana and Acteon pas de deux - after Agrippina Vaganova

Fogo's repertoire with the Vienna State Ballet includes:

- Allegro Brillante - Balanchine
- Concerto - Kenneth MacMillan
- Coppélia - Pierre Lacotte (Swanilda)
- Le Corsaire - Marius Petipa (Medora, Odalisque)
- Don Quixote - Petipa, Rudolf Nureyev (Kitri's friends, Amor)
- EDEN / EDEN - Wayne McGregor
- Der Feuervogel - Andrey Kaydanovskiy (originated Putzfrau)
- La fille mal gardée - Frederick Ashton (Friends)
- Giselle - Petipa (Peasants)
- Jewels - Balanchine ("Rubies")
- Movements to Stravinsky - Andrey Kaydanovskiy (originated 2nd couple)
- The Nutcracker - Nureyev, after Petipa and Lev Ivanov (Snowflake Solo)
- Onegin - John Cranko (Olga)
- Raymonda - Nureyev (Clémence)
- Le Sacre - John Neumeier
- The Second Detail - Forsythe
- Swan Lake - Nureyev (Little Swans, Hungarian Dance)
- Stars and Stripes - Balanchine
- Sylvia - Manuel Legris (Sylvia)
- Tarantella - Balanchine
- Theme and Variations - Balanchine (lead)

== Awards ==
In 2010, Fogo won first prize at Stora Daldansen Nordic Baltic Ballet Competition in Falun, Sweden, and first prize at the International Classical Dance Contest in Grasse, France.
