= Amie Sultan =

Egyptian dancer

Amie Sultan (Arabic: إيمي سلطان, born on 27 December, ? in Singapore) is an Egyptian dancer and actress. She is currently one of the country's best-known belly dancers. Elle Arabia described Amie Sultan as one of Egypt's highest-paid female entertainers.

Sultan is a prominent and strong critic of the development that Oriental dance has undergone in Egypt since the turn of the millennium. Her declared aim is to restore Oriental dance to a better reputation in its country of origin and to have it recognised as intangible cultural heritage by UNESCO.

== Early life and education ==
Sultan was born in Singapore, where her parents worked for several years. Her father works in the petroleum industry, her mother is a musician and her sister Nevine, who lives in the US, is a writer. When Sultan was 15 years old, the family returned to Cairo. There she attended the Cairo American College in Maadi. After graduating from high school, she earned a bachelor's degree in interior design from the Rhodec International Online Interior Design College in the United Kingdom, but never entered the profession because of her ballet career.

At the age of five, her parents encouraged Sultan to take ballet lessons, which she continued in Azerbaijan and Romania. She also learnt jazz dance, contemporary dance and tap dance.

== Dancing career ==
After leaving school, Sultan began working as a ballet and modern dancer alongside her studies. At the age of 15, she joined the ballet team of the Egyptian / Cairo Opera. Sultan performed internationally which took her to Turkey, among other places, where she had her personal key experience that led her to take up Oriental dance. She had visited a cabaret where dance – in the style of the Golden Era in Egypt in the 1940s and 1950s – was seen as an elevated art by both the audience and the dancers. Sultan missed this in her native Egypt and wanted to change it.

In 2014, she studied Oriental dance with Raqia Hassan and performed as a belly dancer for the first time at the end of 2014. Eventually, she made a long-term switch from ballet to Oriental dance. Sultan considers her greatest role models to be the important dancers Samia Gamal and Suheir Zaki, who had a decisive influence on Oriental dance in Egypt between the 1940s and 1960, and 1960 and 180 respectively.

Since 2017, Sultan has repeatedly concluded as the first belly dancer at a film festival, the El Gouna Festival. On the occasion of the film festival, she released the music album Amie Sultan: The Golden Age of Egyptian Cinema Dance Tribute. In 2022, she became the first Egyptian belly dancer to perform at the National Museum of Egyptian Civilisation for the world premiere of Hassan Fathy Architecture of Dance, directed by Spanish director Dani Panullo.

In 2019, Elle Arabia magazine named Amie Sultan as one of the highest-paid female entertainers in Egypt.

== Criticism of the development of Oriental dance in Egypt ==
Amie Sultan is considered one of the most important critics of the development of Oriental dance in Egypt, especially since the turn of the millennium. In Sultan's view, Egyptian belly dance is caught in a vicious circle that can only be broken by returning the dance to the social sphere of high art. Otherwise, according to Sultan, the epicentre of the Oriental dance industry could shift from Egypt to Turkey. Sultan's criticism has been covered by numerous national and international media outlets, including The New York Times, The Guardian, BBC, CNN, Vice, ARD, Elle Arabia, Bloomberg, Taipei Times, Al Arabiya and Dagens Nyheter.

Although Oriental dance is very popular in Egypt and can often be seen at both Muslim and Christian weddings, it has always had an image of permissiveness in conservative Egyptian society and sometimes – especially from an Islamic perspective against the background of the hijab – an image of sinfulness. Accordingly, many female dancers in conservative Egyptian society are subject to intense social stigmatisation. Some women attend dance classes without the knowledge of their families. Due to the social stigmatisation, many Egyptian women, especially from lower social and economic classes, take up the profession because they do not have a good education and cannot survive economically otherwise. This in turn reinforces the already existing prejudices against female belly dancers and links them to prostitution, also as there are cases of managers who have actually pushed female dancers into prostitution. For example, Amie Sultan complains that female belly dancers are more often seen as sex workers than as artists, and says of Egyptian society's ambivalent attitude towards belly dancing:

"A mother will hire a dancer for her son's wedding, but she will never allow her daughter to become a dancer." – Amie Sultan

For its part, the low public-societal regard given to belly dance as an art form means that, as Sultan laments, it is "hidden away in underground cabarets and bars", but an Egyptian family will never see a belly dance in a theatre. This in turn reinforces the association of dance with a debauched nightlife, where many organisers objectify women and see them merely as a means of making money. Female dancers complain that it often matters more that a dancer has the right figure and the right look, rather than that she is actually trained and has mastered the techniques. This threatens to degenerate belly dancing into a sensationalised form of entertainment rather than an art. Sultan complains that dancers are competing to wear increasingly revealing costumes and often even undergo cosmetic surgery such as breast augmentation. In nightclubs in particular, oriental dance is increasingly seen as a strip dance, which in turn can even have legal consequences. Such events in turn confirm the prejudices of Egyptian society against Oriental dance, which repeats the cycle.

== Oriental dance as an elevated art ==
In order to break this vicious circle, Sultan sees no other option than to regard Oriental dance as an elevated art for society as a whole and to present it accordingly on elevated stages, for example at the opera. She also argues in favour of clear etiquette between the audience and the dancer, in which the latter is regarded less as a service provider and more as an artist. For example, Sultan was critical of the fact that dancers should dance to requested pieces of music instead of choosing their own programme; she would also like to see dance less associated with Western musical styles and melodies and instead focus on a return to the dance and music of the classical period and thus to its roots. Similarly, the audience should be shown boundaries if necessary. Sultan reported that she once cancelled a performance because a man came on stage and threw banknotes at her.

"If there's a belly dancer on stage, don't try to dance with her because it's distracting. If you're at the opera, you would never go on stage to dance with the artist." – Amie Sultan

Sultan objects to the term belly dance, as the term is a foreign term (from the French danse du ventre), and prefers to speak of "Egyptian dance".

== Tarab Initiative and Taqseem Institute ==
In 2018, Amie Sultan launched the Tarab Collective initiative, of which she is the chairperson. The initiative has three primary goals:

- To conduct research on Oriental dance in order to preserve it as part of Egyptian culture and to recognise it as a UNESCO intangible cultural heritage in the long term.
- Training new female dancers, especially in the style of the Golden Era of the 1940s to 1950s, such as the style of Samia Gamal and Naima Akef. The dancers should later perform mainly in upscale venues. The students should explicitly orient themselves towards the Golden Era and distance themselves from the more sexualised styles in nightclubs, which, as Sultan says, mix with the traditions of other dance styles.
- To give women a safe place where there are no male-dominated structures where Oriental dance can be learnt.

At the end of June 2022, Sultan opened the Taqseem Institute, a dance academy in the central Cairo neighbourhood of Zamalek, where Oriental dance will be taught while preserving the three primary goals of the Tarab Initiative. The Taqseem Institute has been certified by the UNESCO-affiliated Conseil International de la Danse and aims to train women to become professional dancers as well as to certify them as dance teachers so that they can later set up their own dance schools. The programme follows similar principles to ballet training. In addition, as Sultan says, the institute is a "social club for women; it aims to "break social taboos and focus on music, exploration and therapeutic rituals through authentic Egyptian melodies and sounds and to preserve the history of dance in Egypt".

The institute was opened in the presence of Naguib Sawiris and Azza Fahmy.

In the summer of 2023, the first cohort graduated; the ceremony took place in the presence of several ambassadors at the National Museum of Egyptian Civilisation.

== Worth knowing ==
Sultan has also had her first experience in the acting business. Sultan is also a philanthropist and lecturer.

== Discography ==
- 2021: Amie Sultan: The Golden Age of Egyptian Cinema Dance Tribute.
