= Leona Wood =

American painter, dancer, writer and co-founder (1921–2008)

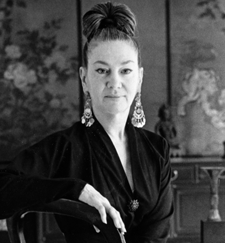
- Leona Wood in 1981
- Born: May 21, 1921; Seattle, Washington, US
- Died: February 7, 2008 (aged 86); Los Angeles, California, US
- Known for: Painting
- Movement: Surrealism, Orientalism

Leona Wood (May 21, 1921 – February 7, 2008) was an American painter, dancer, writer and co-founder of the Aman International Folk Ensemble. Her early paintings were considered a part of the Surrealism school.

== Biography ==
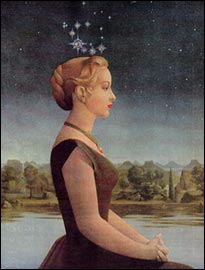
Detail of Corona Borealis, the Northern Crown, painted for the De Beers Collection

Leona Wood was born on May 21, 1921, in Seattle, Washington. As a child, she studied ballet with Ivan Novikoff, where she also learned Caucasian folk dances. She began drawing and painting at an early age, and at sixteen, entered the Annual Exhibition of Northwest Artists (the "Northwest Annual") show at the Seattle Art Museum. She received a fellowship to study design in San Francisco at the school of Bauhaus artist Rudolph Schaeffer. In her late teens, Wood presented her first one-woman show at the Seattle Art Museum.

Wood married Alaskan born physicist Philip Harland in 1939. Shortly after, they moved to New York City, where she worked as a designer and illustrator at Dorland International, Pettingell and Fenton and produced book illustrations for Doubleday. During this period, she was also exhibiting at the Julien Levy Gallery, along with artists such as Salvador Dalí and Eugene Berman.

In 1947, Wood moved to California as Art Director of the Pettingell and Fenton Los Angeles office. While based there, she exhibited at Gump’s Gallery in San Francisco, the Oakland Art Museum and Hewitt Gallery in New York. In 1958, her work was included in the first Spoleto International Art Festival in Italy.

In 1947, when De Beers launched their "A diamond is forever" advertising campaign, they hired such visionary artists as Picasso, Salvador Dalí … and in 1957, Leona Wood. She received a substantial commission for an ongoing series of paintings for these ads, which appeared in publications around the world. These works received special notice in a 1959 Newsweek article on the "Art: USA: 59" exhibit in New York.

In 1956, Wood and Harland produced the music from Curtis Harrington's film The Wormwood Star, a portrait of legendary West Coast painter and occultist Marjorie Cameron, a devotee of English occultist Aleister Crowley and wife to rocket pioneer Jack Parsons.

In the 1960s, the Harlands were active in the UCLA Department of Ethnomusicology, where Philip Harland was teaching drumming. When Harland began playing at Middle Eastern venues, Wood learned Middle Eastern dance in order to accompany him. Before long, the Harlands formed Friends of Arabic Music, a music and dance group, and they became a feature in the Westwood folk dance world.

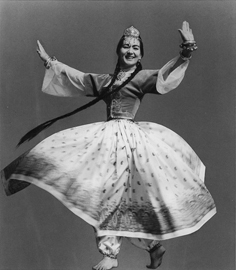
Leona Wood performing a Tadjik dance. Photo: Philip Harland 1965

The Harlands' group often performed with a recreational group called the Village Dancers, led by Tony Shay. He found her to be a "mesmerizing, spectacular performer" and urged her to join forces. In 1965, they co-founded the Aman International Folk Ensemble. Aman was the first local dance company to be presented at the Los Angeles Music Center. Los Angeles Times music and dance critic Martin Bernheimer called Aman "one of the finest ethnic companies anywhere. Repeat: anywhere."

In 1978, the Los Angeles Philharmonic Orchestra engaged Aman to dance to their performances of several compositions based on folk themes, and in 1979, the company made its debut in New York.

Inspired by her involvement with costume design for the company, Wood began painting Middle Eastern dancers and their milieu in the style of 19th century Orientalist painters.

In 1980, Wood received a grant from the National Endowment for the Arts to stage a Kwakiutl winter ceremonial for Aman. She commissioned three ceremonial masks from artist Duane Pasco, and designed the mise en scėne, including a dance screen hung upstage, and a fire that lighted the stage from the center rather than the wings. Martin David called the number "a visual masterpiece."

Wood taught courses on Middle Eastern dance in a cultural context at UCLA extension, and continued to participate in UCLA's Department of Ethnomusicology for many years. She wrote numerous articles on Middle Eastern and other forms of dance. These articles appeared in scholarly publications, magazines and on record and CD covers.

Wood's paintings were exhibited in the Lane Galleries in Westwood, California for over a quarter of a century. Although she stopped showing shortly after her husband’s death in 1980, she continued to paint even more prolifically. During this time, she produced paintings on a wide range of themes, including Venetian maskers and mythological scenes.

Wood died in her home in 2008.

== Publications ==
- "Twilight of the Maharajas", Arabesque, May–June, 1993
- "Danse Macabre", Arabesque, November–December, 1990
- "Dance Profile: The Odyssey of Ivan Novikoff", Arabesque, January–February, 1988
- "Nautchnees and Devadasis" (Part I and Part II), Arabesque, March–April and May–June, 1988
- "Tribes of the Pacific Northwest Coast: Two Centuries of Costume", Ornament, 9(4), 1986
- "An Introduction to the Dance Theatre of the Kwakiutl", Arabesque, November–December, 1981
- "Danse du Ventre: a Fresh Appraisal" Part I and Part II (revised), Arabesque, January–February and March–April, 1980
- "Danse du Ventre: a Fresh Appraisal" with Tony Shay, Dance Research Journal, Spring/Summer, 1976
