= Maria Eichwald =

Kazakh ballet dancer (born 1974)

- Born: October 26, 1974 (age 50); Talgar, Kazakhstan
- Occupation: Prima Ballerina

Maria Eichwald (born 26. Oktober 1974 at Talgar, Kazakhstan) is a Kazakhstani ballet dancer who has settled in Germany.

== Biography ==
Eichwald trained at the national ballet academy in Alma-Ata, Kazakhstan before becoming a soloist dancer at the national theatre. Due to her German ancestry she moved to Germany in 1995. In 1996 she joined the National Theatre Munich where she became a principal dancer in 1999. In Munich she danced a variety of leading roles including Kitri in Don Quixote, Odette/Odile in Swan Lake (Petipa), Tatiana and Olga in Onegin (Cranko), Marguerite Duval in Die Kameliendame (Neumeier) and Manon in Manon (Macmillan). In 2004, Eichwald caused a scandal in the press when she abruptly left the company to accept an offer from the celebrated Stuttgart Ballet in Stuttgart, Germany. Since then, Eichwald has toured the world with the company and in 2005 danced opposite Paris Opera étoile Manuel Legris as Tatiana in Onegin (Cranko) on a tour of Asia. As of 2008, Eichwald continues to be an international ballet favorite among critics and audiences alike and is known for her exceptional skill and technique.

== Nominations and Prizes ==
Eichwald was nominated for a Prix Benois de la Danse in 2002.
