= Natascha Mair =

Austrian ballet dancer

Natasha Mair
- Born: 6 February 1995 (age 30); Vienna, Austria
- Occupation: Ballet dancer
- Years active: 2012-present
- Career
- Current group: English National Ballet
- Former groups: Vienna State Ballet
- Dances: Ballet
- Website: www.nataschamair.com

Natascha Mair (born 6 February 1995) is an Austrian ballet dancer. She joined the Vienna State Ballet in 2012, and was promoted to first soloist in 2018. In 2020, she joined the English National Ballet as a principal dancer.

== Early life ==
Mair was born in Vienna, to Carinthian and Viennese parents, and grew up in Kaisermühlen. She started ballet training at the age of seven at the Vienna State Opera Ballet School. She skipped one year of school and one year of training and passed the Matura and ballet diploma examination in 2012 at the age of seventeen.

== Career ==
Mair joined the Vienna State Ballet in the 2012/13 season. She was named demi-soloist in 2014, and soloist in 2016. In 2018, Manuel Legris, the artistic director of the company promoted Mart the rank of first soloist (also translated as principal), the highest rank of the company, following a performance of The Nutcracker. Since then, she had performed leading roles in Coppélia, Le Corsaire and Don Quixote. She had made guest appearances in Russia, Turkey and Slovenia. Mair had made television appearances including Vienna New Year's Concert, Vienna Opera Ball and documentary Just Ballet.

In 2020, the English National Ballet announced that Mair had joined the company as a Principal, the second highest rank of the company.

== Selected repertoire ==
Mair's repertoire with the Vienna State Ballet includes:

- Clara in The Nutcracker
- Crown Princess Stephanie in Mayerling
- Lise in La Fille mal gardée
- Gulnare in Le Corsaire
- Olga in Onegin
- Henriette in Raymonda
- Hermia in A Midsummer Night’s Dream
- Swanilda in Coppélia
- Juliette in Roméo et Juliette
- Allegro Brillante
- Symphony in C (1st movement)
- "Emeralds" from Jewels
- La Sylphide
- Sylvia
- Études
- Suite en Blanc
- Concerto 1st movements
- The Sleeping Beauty
- Don Quixote
- Giselle
- La Bayadère
- Paquita (excerpt)

== Awards ==
- Prize of the Jury at the International Contest of Ballet Schools in Beijing, 2012
- First Prize at the Premio Roma Danza, 2012
- Promotion Prize of the Ballettclub Wiener Staatsoper & Volksoper, 2014
