= Stephanie Kurlow =

Australian ballerina

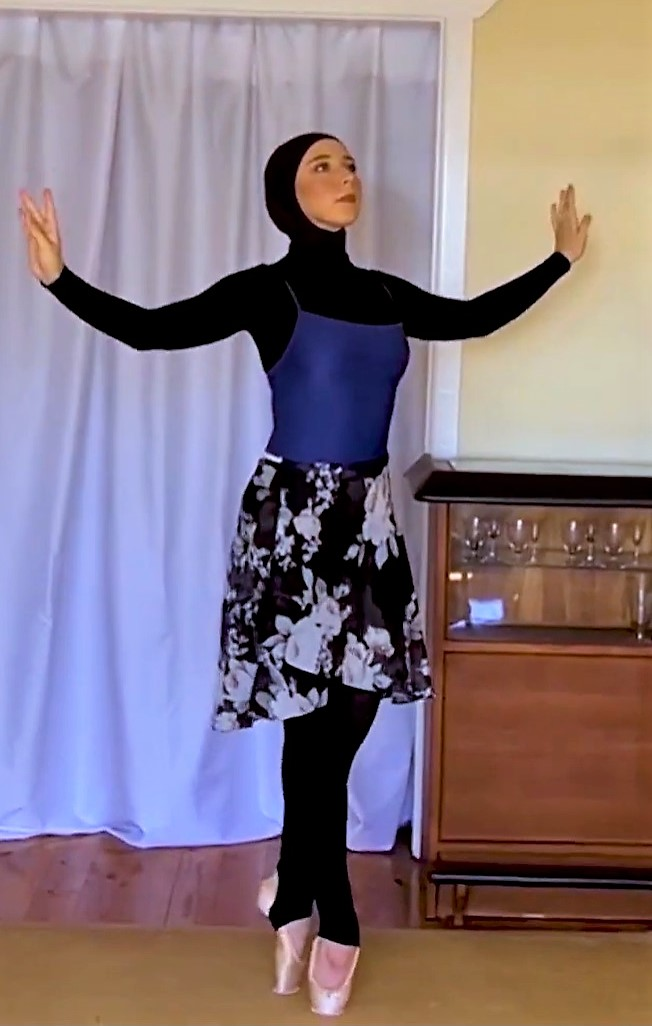
Kurlow dances for Swans for Relief in 2020

Stephanie Kurlow is an Australian dancer and ballet student often credited as being the world's first Hijabi Ballerina.

Kurlow was born to an Australian father of Belarusian descent and a Tatar mother. She grew up in the suburbs of Sydney and began dancing at the age of two. Stephanie stopped dancing at the age of nine in 2010 as there were no dance studios that catered to her beliefs. Inspired by Stephanie's dream, her mother, Alsu Kurlow, opened a performing arts academy in 2012 that offers ballet, martial arts, and aboriginal art classes for girls. She began wearing the hijab full-time when she was ten years old. Kurlow launched an online campaign to raise money for full-time classical ballet training, raising over $7000. Kurlow lists African-American ballet dancer Misty Copeland, Chinese-Australian ballet dancer Li Cunxin, and Emirati figure skater Zahra Lari as her inspirations. She planned to open her own dance school in the future geared towards diverse youths of various backgrounds. Kurlow is an ambassador for Remove Hate From The Debate, a campaign that assists youth in identifying online hate speech and tackling it. She is a recipient of the Aim for the Stars scholarship and the Game Changer Scholarship by Björn Borg. Kurlow was invited as a guest speaker to Indonesia for the Resonation Women's Empowerment Conference in 2017. She also received a scholarship to The Royal Danish Ballet summer school in 2018. Kurlow was featured in a Lenovo campaign with designer Tarese Klemens for International Women's Day in 2018. She was also featured in a global campaign with Converse named Love The Progress in 2019, which invited women to redefine what "girl" means.

In March 2022, Kurlow announced on her Instagram account that she had made the decision to stop wearing the hijab. She shared the struggles of being the only one in her dance community to wear a hijab, and further stated: “at this point in my life it isn’t such a strong part of my visible identity.”
