= Nereyda Rodríguez =

Dominican folklorist and dancer (1931– 2011)

- Born: 16 August 1931; Santiago de los Caballeros, Dominican Republic
- Died: 1 October 2011 (aged 80); Santo Domingo, Dominican Republic
- Occupations: Folklorist, dancer and educator
- Children: 1
- Honours: Knight of the Order of Merit of Duarte, Sánchez and Mella

Nereyda Rodríguez (16 August 1931 – 1 October 2011) was a Dominican folklorist, dancer and educator. She was co-founder and director of the Dominican Folkloric Ballet, originally called "Ballet Negro and Ballet Blanco," and co-founder of the Popular Dancing Theater.

== Biography ==
Rodríguez was born on 16 August 1931 in the neighbourhood of Pueblo Nuevo in Santiago de los Caballeros, Dominican Republic. She was of mixed heritage and "mulatto" ethnicity.

Rodríguez studied at the Dominican Voice School (formerly known as La Voz del Yuna) and achieved a Certificate of Proficiency as a dancer on 17 May 1955, signed by Trujillo Molina and Antonio Elpi (director of the school). She had a career dancing on stage and for national television and promoted Dominican rhythms and traditions in her performances.

Rodríguez founded the Teatro Popular Danzante (Popular Dancing Theater) with Jaime Lucero, Magalis Rodríguez de Abreu and José Contreras. Alongside Fradique Lizardo, she was also co-founder and director of the Dominican Folkloric Ballet, originally called "Ballet Negro and Ballet Blanco." She formed the first acrobatic dance couple in the country with Mirope Arvelo. After retiring from the stage, she taught dance through a foundation associated with the Teatro Popular Danzante.

Rodríguez died from an internal hemorrhage on 1 October 2011 in Santo Domingo, Dominican Republic, aged 80. Her death was announced by the president of the Dominican Federation of Art and Culture, Julio Quezada. She was survived by her daughter, Cenia Rodríguez.

== Honours ==
- Gloria Nacional de la Danza de República Dominicana (National Dance Glory Award of the Dominican Republic)
- Medal of Merit on International Women's Day (2010)
- Knight of the Order of Merit of Duarte, Sánchez and Mella

Rodríguez was also dubbed a "Dominican Cultural Treasure" by the Dominican government on the inaugural National Folklore Day in February 2006.
