= Nikolina Nikoleski =

Croatian dancer

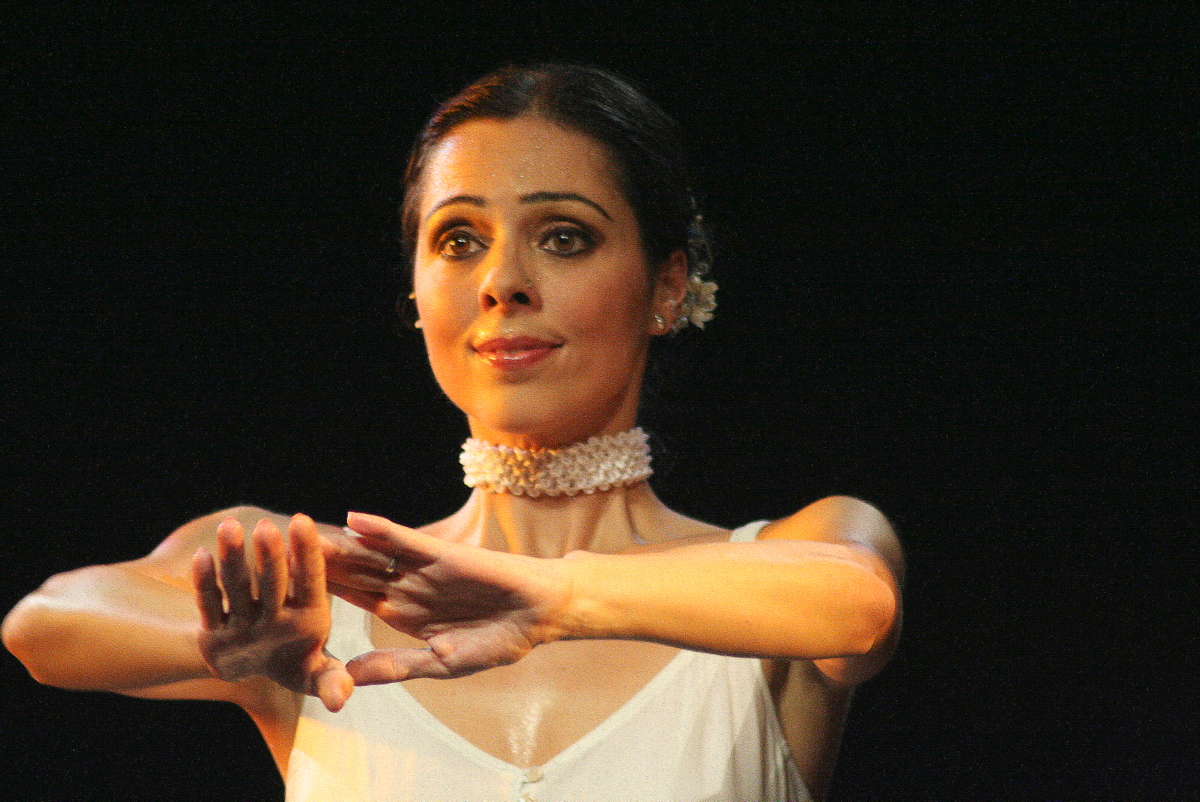
Nikoleski performing in Delhi (2010)

Nikolina Nikoleski (born 1976), born in Zagreb, Croatia, is a dancer and choreographer of Bharatanatyam. She studied contemporary dance in Germany at the Folkwang Hochschule Essen, a dance academy founded by Pina Bausch, and spent six years in India learning Bharatanatyam under Padmashree Dr. Saroja Vaidyanathan. Her father is Macedonian from Vranče, Macedonia, and her mother is Croatian from Zagreb, Croatia.

She was a professor of dance at the French Embassy School in Delhi, and Fr. Agnel School, Delhi. In 2012, she established the Nikolina Nikoleski Dance Academy, where she runs classes in contemporary dance, ballet, and Bharatanatyam.

She has performed in Paris, Vienna, Casablanca, Khajuraho, Chennai, Mahabalipuram, the Taj Mahal, and Luxembourg. She has worked with artists such as Dominique Mercy, Malou Airaudo, Bob Wilson, Ben Riepe, Juan Kruz Silva de Esnaola, Lutz Forster, Sonal Mansingh, Priyadarsini Govind, Rama Vaidyanathan, Anup Jalota, Jagjit Singh, Hariharan, and Madhup Mudgal.

She regularly performs in international TV shows, including the Indian TV shows Doordarshan– "Nritya Sangam" and "Journey through the Arts", and the Croatian TV shows "IN magazine", "Red Carpet", and "Zivot uzivo". She has also been featured in several documentary movies.
