= Kunduz Mirkarimova =

Uzbek dancer, choreographer, and teacher (1925–2019)

- Қундуз Миркаримова
- Born: 8 March 1925; Tashkent, Uzbekistan
- Died: 11 June 2019 (aged 94); Tashkent, Uzbekistan
- Occupations: dancer, choreographer
- Awards: People’s Artist of Uzbekistan (1966), People’s Artist of the USSR (1984), Order of Friendship (1997)

Kunduz Mirkarimova (Uzbek: Қундуз Миркаримова, romanized: Qunduz Mirkarimova; 8 March 1925 – 11 June 2019) was an Uzbek dancer, choreographer and teacher, People's Artist of Uzbekistan (1966), People's Artist of the USSR (1984).

== Early life and education ==
Kunduz Mirkarimova was born in 1925 or according to other sources in 1928 in Tashkent. From 1937 to 1941, she was educated at the Tamarakhonim Ballet School. In 1951, Mirkarimova graduated from the Moscow State Academy of Choreography in Moscow.

== Career ==
From 1943 to 1946, Mirkarimova worked as a solo dancer at the Yangiyul Theater of Musical Drama and Comedy and from 1946 to 1949 at the Muqumi Theater. In 1951–1973, she danced at the Alisher Navoi Bolshoi Opera and Ballet Theater in Tashkent.

From 1953 to 1956, Mirkarimova worked at the State Philharmonic of Uzbekistan. In 1957, Mirkarimova created an ensemble “Bakhor” (“Spring”). Since 1964, she started teaching choreography. She worked as a teacher-tutor of the ensemble until 1969. Since 1979, Mirkarimova became an artistic director of the ensemble.

Mirkarimova performed Uzbek dances in more than 30 countries, including China, France, Austria, Poland, England, Scotland and Brazil.

In 1966, Mirkarimova was awarded a title of the People's Artist of Uzbek SSR. She was a teacher at the Tashkent State Higher School Of National Dance And Choreography (1964-1979 and 1988; professor since 1996).

In 1984, Mirkarimova was awarded a title of the People's Artist of the USSR. In 1994, she became the winner of the Mukarram Turgunbova Prize. In 1997, Mirkarimova was awarded the Order of Friendship.

Kunduz Mirkarimova died on 11 June 2019 in Tashkent.

== Awards and honors ==
- Medal "For Distinguished Labour" (1951)
- People's Artist of the Uzbek SSR (1966)
- People's Artist of the USSR (1984)
- Medal "Shukhrat" (1994)
- M. Turgunbaeva Prize (1994)
- Order of Friendship (1997)
- Dustlik Order (1997)
