= Golladay Hall =

Historic house in Mississippi, United States

- U.S. Historic district – Contributing property
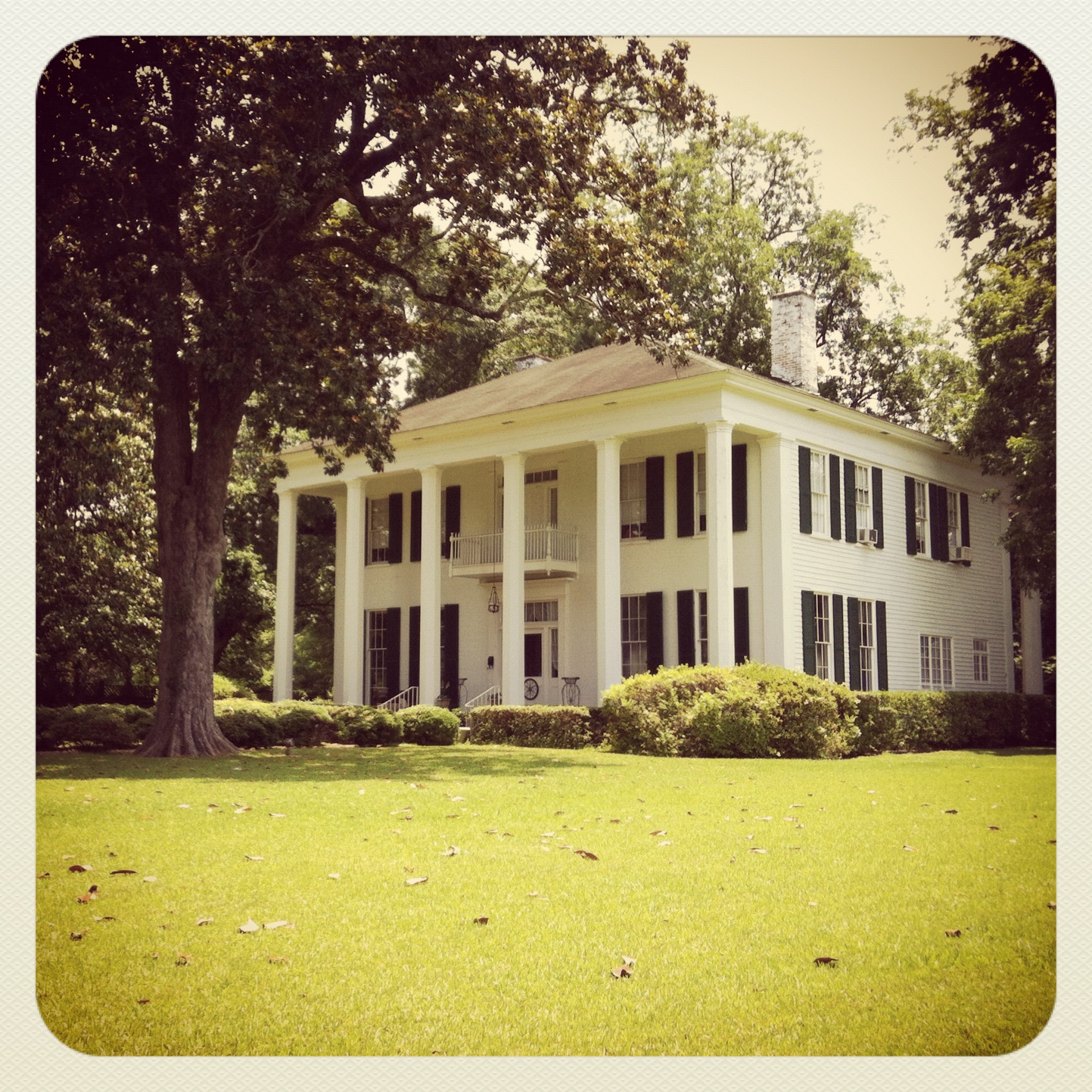
- Golladay Hall Plantation

- Location within Mississippi Location within the United States
- Location: 501 Margin Street, Grenada, Mississippi, U.S.
- Coordinates: 33°46′56.9″N 89°48′32.3″W
- Built: 1850s
- Architect: John Moore
- Architectural style: Greek Revival
- Part of: Margin St. Historic District (ID87002338)
- Added to NRHP: April 7, 1988

Golladay Hall is a historic mansion in Grenada, Mississippi, USA. It was built in the 1850s on a Southern plantation for the Golladay family, members of the Southern aristocracy from Tennessee who owned plantations and invested in railroads. The mansion was used by Jefferson Davis, the President of the Confederate States of America, during the American Civil War. In 1932, a Golladay heiress was murdered inside the house. The mansion was restored in the 1950s.

== Location ==
The mansion is located at 501 Margin Street in Grenada, Grenada County, Mississippi, USA. It is near the Yalobusha River.

== History ==
The mansion was built in the 1850s. It was designed in the Greek Revival architectural style by architect John Moore. It was surrounded by 1550 acres of cotton and corn. The plantation had an overseer and African slaves. There was also an apple orchard and a vegetable garden.

The original owner was George S. Golladay, a planter from Lebanon, Tennessee who served on the board of directors of the Mississippi Central Railroad, and his wife Martha. The Golladays entertained prominent members of the Southern aristocracy such as James K. Polk, who served as the 11th President of the United States from 1845 to 1849, and Jefferson Davis, who served as the President of the Confederate States of America from 1862 to 1865. During the Civil War, the mansion remained in the Golladay family. President Davis used it as his headquarters. Meanwhile, Sam Golladay gunned down a Union officer, who had deserted the army, when the soldier approached the house. This resulted in the only casualty to happen in Grenada.

After the war, it was inherited by their daughter, Davidella, and her husband, George Lake, a dry goods merchant. They passed it on their daughter, Minnihaha Lake Barbee. However, in May 1932, she was murdered by strangulation inside the house.

The mansion was inherited by Golladay's grandson, Golladay Lake. However, he sold it to Junius Townes and his wife, Adelaide, in 1954. The couple restored it. It was later purchased by the Bondurant family, followed by the King family.

== Architectural significance ==
As a contributing property on the Margin St. Historic District, it has been listed on the National Register of Historic Places since April 7, 1988.
