= Ivan Novikoff =

Ivan Novikoff (August 26, 1899 – March 20, 2002) was a ballet master.

Born in Kazan, Russia, Novikoff studied and graduated from the Imperial Ballet School aka Mariinsky. He fled to Harbin, China because of the Russian Revolution of 1917 at age 17, where he taught dance for the community of Russians.

In 1923, he immigrated to the United States, where he continued teaching ballet until his death. After arriving in San Francisco, Novikoff moved to New York City, where Novikoff and his brother Boris Novikoff together directed Metropolitan Opera Ballet Company. Moving westwards to Seattle, he founded the Novikoff School of Russian-American Ballet in the early 1950s and received the Governor's Heritage Award (of the state of Washington) in 1989. Novikoff followed in the footsteps of his lifetime inspiration Michael Forkin in pure Classic Russian Artistry.

Among his students in Seattle were Robert Joffrey and Gerald Arpino. Leona Wood, the founder of Aman Folk Ensemble, Richard Ingram, one of the choreographers of Royal Ballet and Mark Morris the director of Mark Morris Company, Erricka S Turner, a former member of Oakland Ballet Company.
