= Oleksii Zhylenko =

Ukrainian dance coach

Oleksii Zhylenko (Ukrainian: Олексій Жиленко) is a professional Ballroom and Latin dance coach, a World class adjudicator, a professional ballroom dancer and a DanceSport competitor and choreographer. He was born in Kyiv, Ukraine.

== Dance competition ==
As a dance competitor he was finalist of the World Cup in International Ballroom (2006, Moscow, Russia), the National Champion of Ukraine (2002 and 2010), obtained the title of Master of Sport of Ukraine (2002) and was winner and medalist of major national and international championships.

== As a Ballroom and Latin dance coach ==
In his coaching career his students have included:

- Mykola Khrabust & Olga Riznychenko are Champions of the World (2013), National Champions of Ukraine (2012) in age group Senior.
- Denys Korostashov & Nataliya Kostyleva are National Champions of Ukraine (2009), Bronze medalists of World Championship (2011) in age group Under 21.

== Memberships ==
- 1997–present: Ukrainian Dance Sport Association (Kyiv, Ukraine)
- 2009–present: World Dance Council (London, Great Britain) – International Adjudicator.
- 2012–present: World Dance Council (London, Great Britain) – International Competitor and International Dance Teacher.
- 2013–present: International Dance Council CID UNESCO (Paris, France).
