= Jairo Barrull Fernández =

Spanish Romani dancer

Bald Jairo
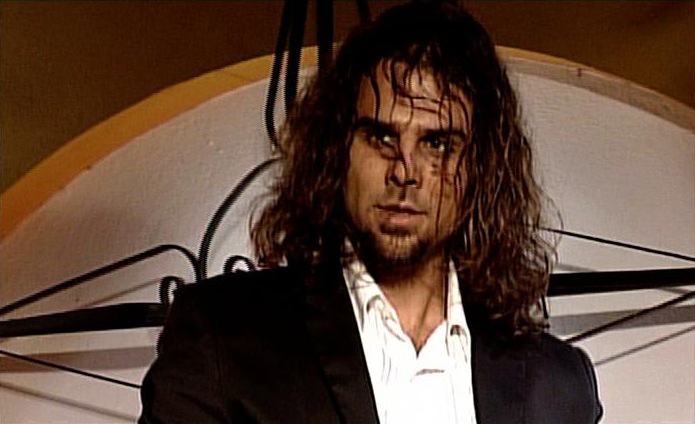
- Born: 10 May 1983 (age 43); Seville, Spain
- Occupation: Flamenco dancer
- Career
- Dances: flamenco
- Website: http://www.jairobarrull.com

Jairo Barrull Fernández (10 May 1983, Seville) artistically known as Jairo Barrull is a Spanish Romani flamenco dancer. He is son of flamenco dancer Ramon Barrull, and great great nephew of flamenco guitarist Diego del Gastor.

== Early life ==
Jairo's artistic legacy comes from his family ‘Los Negros de Ronda-The Black Ones from Ronda’. He began dancing under the direction of his father when he was 7 years old. At 8 years of age, Jairo made his first public appearance at ‘El Gazpacho Andaluz de Morón de la Frontera’. When he was 13, he danced as a solo artist for the first time in Germany in the show Almoraima with Concha Vargas and Curro Fernández. In 1997, Jairo participated in the homage to ‘El Cristo de los Gitanos’ in Los Palacios, Seville with El Chocolate, Aurora Vargas, Enrique Soto Sordera, Pansequito and Jose de la Tomasa. Later that year he toured across Finland, Norway and Sweden as a solo artist performing ‘Flamenco Joven’.

He performed with Concha Vargas, Antonio El Pipa and Juana Amaya at The Vatican's Paul VI Auditorium in the show Un Gitano de Ley, performed for Pope John Paul II in celebration of the beatification of Ceferino Giménez Malla El Pele. Jairo returned to Germany in 1998, where he performed in Bremen alongside Juana Amaya and Arcángel.

== Artistic career ==
In 1999, Jairo performed as a solo artist in the Vredenburg Theatre, Utrecht (the Netherlands), in the flamenco performance ‘Una Noche de Flamenco Puro’ alongside Angelita Vargas, El Chocolate, Niño de Pura and El Boquerón. Jairo also danced in the Festival Flamenco of Düsseldorf, Germany, and toured Sweden for the second time performing ‘Gypsy Kids’ in the ‘Dansens Hus’, Stockholm.

Later that same year Jairo participated as a lead dancer in Abolengo, which premiered on Broadway, New York. Jairo's tour with Abolengo led to him being featured in the documentary ‘Around Flamenco’, produced by Canal Sur Television. In 2000 he was contracted by Teruo Kabaya for a month tour of Tokyo, performing ‘Flamenca y Flamenco’. In 2001 Jairo embarked on an extensive tour across North America and Argentina performing the show ‘Al-Andalus’ that premiered in the Avenida Theatre with the following artists: Farruquito, Torombo y Jose Maya. The great success of Al-Andalus lead to the show ‘Incognito’ by juggler Francis Brunn in Frankfurt, which premiered in the Alte Oper of Frankfurt, where Jairo danced as one of the main flamenco dancers alongside Farruco, Torombo y José Maya.

He starred in the premiere of Rafael Amargo's show ‘Tablao’ in Barcelona alongside Sevillian dancers Farruco and Torombo. That autumn he returned to Sweden where he danced alongside Gerardo Núñez and the following year he danced in the flamenco show ‘Alma Gitana’ alongside his father: Ramon Barrull and Manolo Soler with Juana Amaya's company and performed in The 1st Feria Mundial of Flamenco, The Flamenco Festival of Mistela, El Potaje Gitano de Utrera and La Fundación El Monte, Seville and the New World Flamenco Festival, California, USA. The following year Jairo danced in the show ‘Magia de Maestros’ where he shone at the Berliner Philharmonie with the following artists: Juana Amaya, Gerardo Núñez, Carmen Cortes and Rafael de Carmen.

In 2004 Jairo danced in the program ‘El Flamenco que viene’ alongside his uncle Diego de Morón and participates in ‘Mas Jóvenes, mas flamenco’ in the ‘XIII Bienal de Flamenco de Sevilla. The following year he presented his show in ‘El Monte’, Seville: ‘To my father Ramon Barrull’, which received excellent reviews from the ABC and El Mundo Spanish newspapers. In 2006 Jairo participated in the show Morón, a time and a rhythm in the New World Flamenco Festival in California, America. He also participated in the ‘Sinfonia Flamenca’ with Juan Carmona's group in the ‘Orchestre National de Lyon Auditorium.’ The following year Jairo performed at the Mont de Marsan Flamenco Festival, in the show Moroneando as well as the Berlin Flamenco Festival with Tomas de Perrate.

January 2009 saw the premiere of Jairo's flamenco show Herencia in the Theatre Oriente, which paid tribute to his father Ramon Barrull in Morón de la Frontera. In 2010 Jairo presented his new flamenco show Dos Ramas with Angelita Vargas as the invited artist, which premiered at the Festival Flamenco Mont-de-Marsan 2010 in France and performed in the show Gitaneria which premiered as part of the Festival Flamenco Gitano 2010 in the USA. More recently Jairo has performed in the I Flamenco Festival en la Frontera 2011 and the I Flamenco Festival of Moscow.
