= Khánh Thi =

Vietnamese dancer

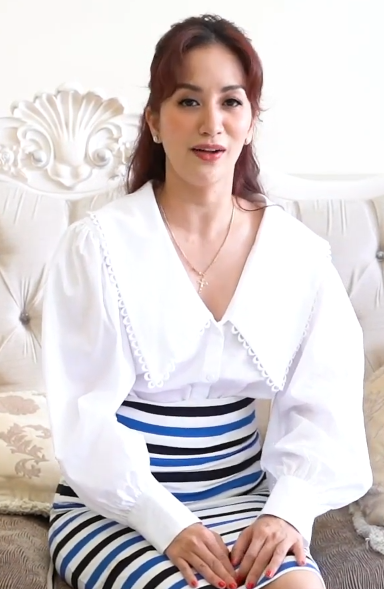
- Khánh Thi in 2021
- Born: Nguyễn Hồng Thi; March 21, 1982 (age 43); Hanoi, Vietnam
- Occupation: Dancer
- Years active: 2002–present
- Partner: Phan Hiển
- Awards: Gold Medal Rumba & Jive in Asian Indoor Games 2009 The Prime Minister Awarded the Labor Medal

Khánh Thi is the grand master of Dancesport of Vietnam and a choreographer of Dance Shows. Khánh Thi and professional dancer Chí Anh used to dance as a couple, but after achieving success, Khánh Thi went on to dance with Phan Hiển who remains her partner to date. She has won many awards in Dancesport, including two Vietnam Open Dancesport Championship Awards, an AIG Award and a SEA Games. With so much success, she has become the grandmaster of Dancesport in Vietnam.

From 2010 to 2025 Khanh Thi and Cat Tien Sa company combined with VTVKhanh Thi is both a counselor and a judge of the gameshow Dancing with The Stars (Bước Nhảy Hoàn Vũ Việt Nam) and So You Think You Can Dance Việt Nam (Thử Thách Cùng Bước Nhảy). Khanh Thi is the organizers about 20 large and small dance competitions in Vietnam: CK Open International Dancesport Championships, KTOC - Khanh Thi Open Dancesport Championship 15th, Rising Stars...

In June 2017, Khanh Thi organized a live concert to celebrate 25 years of singing and dancing.
