= Elizabeth McGorian =

Zimbabwean ballerina

- Born: Zambia
- Occupation: Ballet dancer

Elizabeth McGorian is a Zimbabwean ballerina. She is a Principal Character Artist with the Royal Ballet, London.

== Biography ==
Elizabeth McGorian was born in Zambia and grew up in Zimbabwe, where she studied at the Mercia Hetherington School. She joined the Royal Ballet School in 1976.

McGorian joined the Royal Ballet in 1977. She was promoted to soloist in 1991 and principal character artist in 1997.
