= Kamilla Carvalho =

Brazilian samba dancer

- Born: Wagner Carvalho c.1988 Morro da Providência
- Occupation: Hairdresser
- Known for: Samba dancer

Kamilla Carvalho is a Brazilian samba dancer who, in 2018, became the first transgender woman to dance as a muse in Rio de Janeiro's Carnival.

She began parading in carnival at age 14, originally with samba school Vizinha Faladeira. In 2008, she paraded with the samba school Acadêmicos do Salgueiro for the first time, and, in 2017, the head of the school, Regina Celi, invited her to dance as muse in the 2018 parade. Celi was a client of Carvalho's in her profession as a hairdresser. The following year, Carvalho was invited to dance as muse for carnival block Cordão da Bola Preta.

Carvalho underwent four surgeries as part of her transition, beginning at age 22. She legally changed her name after she felt humiliated at being misgendered at an airport.
