= Özcan Tekgül =

Turkish actress

- Born: 15 January 1941; Çubuklu, Istanbul, Turkey
- Died: 2 July 2011 (aged 70); Antalya, Turkey
- Occupations: Belly dancer, actress
- Years active: 1955–1986
- Spouse: İdris Tekgül

Özcan Tekgül (15 January 1941 – 2 July 2011) was a Turkish belly dancer and actress. She was particularly known for her signature "Ateş Dansı" ("Dance of Fire") and her roles in numerous Yeşilçam films.

== Early life and career ==
Tekgül was born in the Çubuklu district of Istanbul in 15 January 1941. At the age of 13 in 1954, she gained public attention by winning a "Beach Beauty" contest organized by a local newspaper. This led to opportunities in theater, and by 1955, she was performing at venues such as the Karaca and Ses Theaters.

== Film career ==
Tekgül made her film debut in Kaybolan Gençlik (1955), directed by Faruk Kenç. Over the next two decades, she acted in around 30 films, often playing strong, seductive female leads. Her notable films include:

- Papatya (1956)
- Sokak Kızı (1962)
- Çadır Gülü (1963)
- Yedi Adım Sonra (1968)
- Dişi Hedef (1971)

Her screen presence frequently integrated her dance performances.

== International performances ==
In the 1960s, Tekgül performed abroad in Egypt, Lebanon, and parts of Asia.

== Controversies ==
Tekgül's open expression of sexuality in dance led to legal troubles. In 1956, she was charged for participating in what authorities called "indecent photography." The incident sparked national debate about art, morality, and the treatment of female performers in Turkey.

== Later life and death ==
After retiring in 1986, Tekgül relocated to Antalya. She died on 2 July 2011 following a traffic accident. Her death initially went unnoticed; her body remained in the morgue for days until friends arranged her funeral. She was buried at Uncalı Cemetery in Antalya.

== Selected filmography ==
- Kaybolan Gençlik (1955)
- Papatya (1956)
- Sokak Kızı (1962)
- Çadır Gülü (1963)
- Yedi Adım Sonra (1968)
- Dişi Hedef (1971)
