= Soheir Zaki =

Egyptian belly dancer and actress (1945–2026)

- سهير زكي
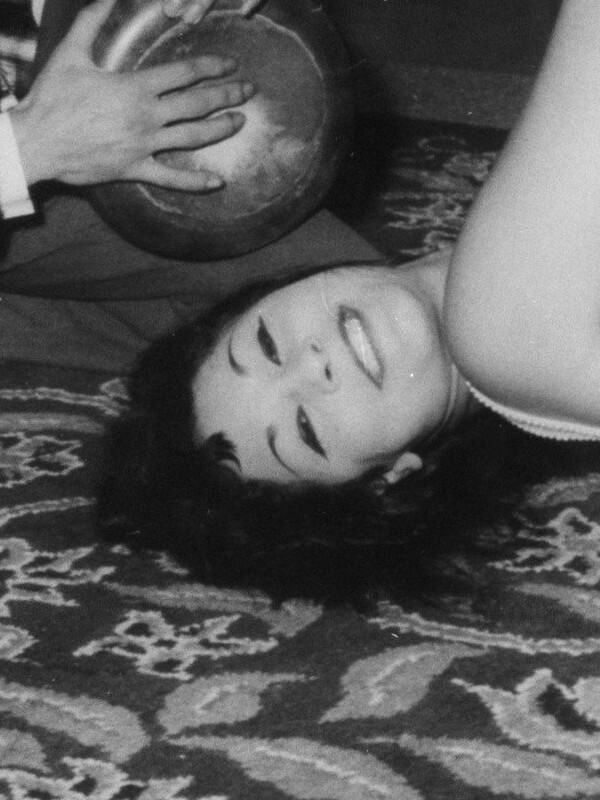
- Zaki in 1965
- Born: Suheir Zaki Abdullah; 4 January 1945; Mansoura, Egypt
- Died: 2 May 2026 (aged 81); Cairo, Egypt
- Occupations: Dancer; actress
- Years active: 1960–1992
- Spouse: Mohamed Emara
- Children: 1

Soheir Zaki (Arabic: سهير زكي; 4 January 1945 – 2 May 2026) was an Egyptian belly dancer and actress.

== Early life ==
Soheir Zaki was born in Mansoura, Egypt on 4 January 1945, but her origins are from Upper Egypt. When she was nine, her parents moved the family to Alexandria. Her father died when she was young and her mother remarried. Her stepfather later became her manager. Zaki first learned how to dance by watching films featuring Taheyya Kariokka and Samia Gamal.

== Career ==
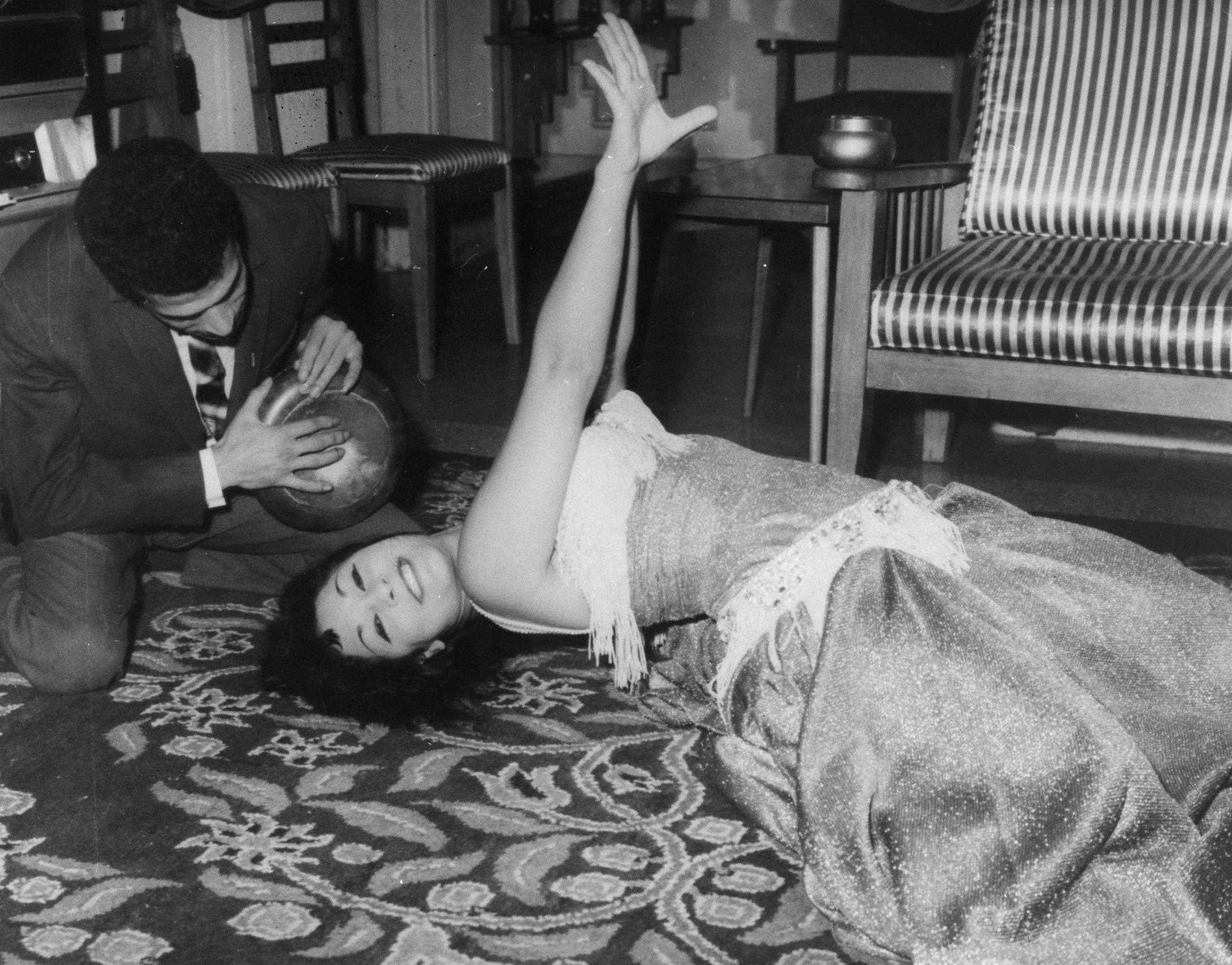
Soheir Zaki performing while accompanied by a drummer, 1965

Zaki began her career as a wedding dancer in Alexandria. Television producer Mohammed Salem saw her dancing and decided to launch her as a television presenter on Egyptian television. However, she showed more skill as a dancer and became known for her appearances on shows like Adwoua El-Madina. She then moved to appearing in Egyptian films. She played minor roles in most of her films, concentrating mainly on dancing. In interviews, she has stated that Nagua Fouad was her "biggest rival" at the time.

She also performed frequently in Egyptian nightclubs, particularly at the Nile Hilton Hotel in Cairo. In 1964, she became to first belly dancer to dance to Umm Kulthum's music when she danced to "Inta Omri".

Over the course of her career, Zaki danced for many politicians, including Anwar Sadat, Gamal Abdel Nasser and Richard Nixon. She retired in 1992, although she later taught belly dance at Raqia Hassan's Egyptian Academy of Oriental Dance in Cairo.

== Personal life and death ==
Zaki was married to Egyptian cinematographer Mohamed Emara. Zaki died on 2 May 2026, at the age of 81.

== Partial filmography ==
- 1963: Thaman al Hob (The Price of Love)
- 1963: Aelit Zizi' (Zizi's Family)
- 1963: Sanawat El Hobb’ (Years of Love)
- 1964: Hekayet Gawaz (The Story of a Marriage)
- 1964: Daani wal demouh (Alone with My Tears)
- 1964: Matloub Zawja Fawran (An Intimate Wedding)
- 1966: Cairo 30
- 1966: Al Abeed (The Idiot)
- 1969: Al-shaitan (The devil)
- 1969: Al-Rajul Zu Al-Khamsat Wujooh (The Man with Five Faces) – TV miniseries
- 1970: Seraa Maa el Mawt (The Struggle with Death)
- 1970: El Maganeen el Talata (The Three Lunatics)
- 1971: Rejal fil al Misyada (Men in the Trap)
- 1972: Melouk al Shar (Kings of Evil)
- 1975: Alo, ana al ghetta (Hello, I am the Cat)
- 1978: Sultana al Tarab
- 1978: ‘Al Kallema Al Akhira (The Last Word)
- 1979: Yomhel wala Yohmel (God Waits but Never Neglects)
- 1982: Aroussa Wa Gouz Ersan (A Bride and Two Grooms)
- 1983: Enna Rabbaka Labelmersad (The Lord of the Lookout)
- 1983: Al Rajel Elle Ba'aa al Shams
