= Jeffrey Golladay =

American ballet dancer

- Born: Jeffrey Golladay
- Education: Ballet Dallas, Houston Ballet Academy, San Francisco Ballet
- Known for: Ballet
- Awards: NFAA

Jeffrey Golladay is an American ballet dancer and was a member of the corps de ballet with American Ballet Theatre (ABT).

== Biography ==
Born in Virginia and raised in Dallas, Texas, he started his training at Ballet Dallas at age 10 under the instruction of Thom Clower and Anna Donovan. In 1994 he began his professional career when he joined Ballet Dallas' main company and remained until 1996. In the spring of 1996 he decided to leave Ballet Dallas and further his training at the Houston Ballet Academy. In the summer of 1997, Mr. Golladay officially joined the San Francisco Ballet.

== Career ==
Jeffrey Golladay joined San Francisco Ballet in 1997 and continued dancing with the company until 2001. During this time he danced a variety of roles, including parts in Lubovitch's Othello, Balanchine's Symphony in C, Lew Christensen's Con Amore and roles in various classical pieces including Giselle, The Sleeping Beauty and Swan Lake.

Golladay left San Francisco Ballet at the end of the 2001 Season and joined Houston Ballet.

His repertoire with the flagship Texan ballet company includes roles in James Kudelka's Firebird, McIntye's Peter Pan and Stevenson's stagings of Cleopatra, The Nutcracker and Swan Lake. His contribution in young choreographer Brian Enos' The Long Road Home in March 2001 was particularly well received.

He reportedly ended his tenure with Houston Ballet in 2002 without a landing spot. The Houston Chronicle attributed this to the fact that, despite Golladay's star potential, the dancer was not promoted.

In 2003, Golladay joined American Ballet Theatre as a corps de ballet dancer.

During his time with the company Mr Golladay has danced leading roles in Sechs Tänze, Sinfonietta, Within You Without You: A Tribute to George Harrison, workwithinwork and Drink to Me Only with Thine Eyes, Michel Fokine's Petrouchka, Kenneth MacMillan's Manon as well as roles in Agnes de Mille's Rodeo, Lar Lubovitch's Meadow, Frederick Ashton's Sylvia, and Twyla Tharp's In the Upper Room.

His guest appearances have included dancing the Caballero and Gunslinger roles in Linda Walker's A Southwest Nutcracker with the Tucson Regional Ballet.

Mr Golladay was part of ABT's principal dancer Ethan Stiefel's troupe "Stiefel and Stars", a four-week summer workshop for dance students held annually on Martha's Vineyard in the month of August offering pre-professional dancers a chance to learn from the stars of the field.

Star guest teachers include Stiefel, Gillian Murphy, Johan Kobborg, Marcelo Gomes, Sascha Radetsky, Stella Abrera, and Alina Cojocaru.

In the summer of 2012, Golladay left American Ballet Theatre and retired from dancing.

== Companies and Roles ==
=== San Francisco Ballet ===
After joining the San Francisco Ballet, Jeffrey danced with the company until the 2001 season. Under Helgi Tomasson's direction he performed a variety of roles, including:

- An Acrobat in Helgi Tomasson's Romeo and Juliet
- The Carnival Dance in Lar Lubovitch's Othello
- The Gangster in Lew Christensen's Filling Station
- The Chinese Dance in Lew Christensen's The Nutcracker
- The Green Man in Lila York's Celts
- Helgi Tomasson's Criss Cross
- Jerome Robbins’ Glass Pieces
- The Entertainers in Kenneth MacMillan's The Invitation
- Harald Lander's Etudes
- Helgi Tomasson's Giselle
- The Student in Lew Christensen's Con Amore
- Balanchine's Theme and Variations
- Helgi Tomasson's Swan Lake
- Helgi Tomasson's Much Ado . . .
- Vladimir Anguelov's Impetuous
- Mark Morris’ Pacific
- Demi-Soloist in the Fourth Movement of Balanchine's Symphony in C
- Helgi Tomasson's The Sleeping Beauty
- Four Men in Nureyev's Raymonda - Act III
- Christopher Stowell's Opus 50
- Yuri Possokov's Magrittomania

=== Houston Ballet ===
Jeffrey subsequently joined the Houston Ballet as a full-time member of its corps de ballet under the artistic direction of Ben Stevenson until his departure in 2002. During this time his roles with the company included:

- Brian Enos’ The Long Road Home
- John in Trey McIntye's Peter Pan
- Jaguar in James Kudelka's The Firebird
- The Senate in Ben Stevenson's Cleopatra
- A Militron and the Russian Dance in Ben Stevenson's The Nutcracker
- The Pas de Trois in Ben Stevenson's Swan Lake
- Lila York's Rules of the Game
- A Street Dancer in Ben Stevenson's Don Quixote

=== American Ballet Theatre ===
Since his start with American Ballet Theatre in 2003, Jeffrey has performed a variety of classical and contemporary roles with the company. He has been predominantly noticed for his contemporary interpretations. His repertoire with the company comprises:

- Lead Pontevedrian in Ronald Hynd's The Merry Widow
- Head Fakir in Natalia Makarova's La Bayadère
- Reds in Twyla Tharp's Brief Fling
- Ensemble in Twyla Tharp's Rabbit and Rogue
- Satyr in Lar Lubovitch's Artemis
- Jiří Kylián's Sechs Tänze
- Jiří Kylián's Sinfonietta
- Bugle Boy In Paul Taylor's Company B
- William Forsythe's Workwithinwork
- Sancho Panza in Kevin's Mckenzie's staging of Don Quixote
- A Toreador in Kevin Mckenzie's staging of Don Quixote
- A Villager in Kevin McKenzie's staging of Giselle
- Neapolitan in Kevin Mckenzie's staging of Swan Lake
- Red Couples in John Neumeier's Lady of the Camellias
- The Lovers-in-Innocence piece in Antony Tudor's Pillar of Fire
- Stanton Welch's Isn’t It A Pity? piece in Within You, Without You
- A Mandolin in Sir Kenneth MacMillan's Romeo and Juliet
- Frederick Ashton's Sylvia
- A Groom in Michel Fokine's Petrouchka
- A Young Boy in Michel Fokine's Polovtsian Dances
- The Caller in Agnes de Mille's in Rodeo
- Mark Morris’ Drink To me Only with Thine Eyes
- Lar Lubovitch's Othello as Carnival
- A Soldier in Kurt Jooss’ The Green Table
- Ensemble in Lar Lubovitch's Meadow
- The Beggar Chief in Sir Kenneth MacMillan's Manon
- Demi-Soloist in Balanchine's Theme and Variations
- A Pirate in Marius Petipa's Le Corsaire
- Antony Tudor's The Leaves are Fading
- Twyla Tharp's Baker's Dozen
- Speaker of the Jury in Agnes de Mille's Fall River Legend

== Awards ==
- National Foundation for Advancement in the Arts awardee (1997).

== Reviews ==
- The Nutcracker, Haglund's Heel, 30/12/10: "The Kitchen Scene, which included the ever-theatrical cook, Jeffrey Golladay, (...) is but one of the many unique pluses of this new production.
- Don Quixote, Roberta on the Arts, 02/06/10: " His side-kick, Sancho Panza, expertly portrayed by (...) Jeffrey Golladay, was a delight. "
- La Bayadère, Roberta on the Arts, 28/06/2008: "As Magdaveya, Jeffrey Golladay seemed smoothly driven, with a sense of danger. (...) as head fakir, (he) drew the audience in, hovering over the smoldering cauldron center stage."
- Fall River Legend, Roberta on the Arts, 4/11/2007: " ...Jeffrey Golladay, as Speaker of the Jury, captivated the onstage and offstage crowds with linguistic largesse."
- Rodeo, Explore Dance, 21/10/2006: "One last note – Jeffrey Golladay knows how to call a square dance! A ballet dancer with a way for words."
- Southwest Nutcracker, Tucson Weekly, 02/12/2004: "Guest stars Renata Pavam and Jeffrey Golladay of ABT will fly in from New York to undertake the parts of the Prickly Pear Fairy and her Caballero. (...) When the two of them dance together, people's jaws just drop. They're all legs and extensions and gorgeous arms."
- Sechs Tänze, Critical Dance, 23/10/2004: "Closing the program was Kylian's "Sechs Tänze" danced by Monique Meunier, Anne Milewski, Laura Hidalgo, Marian Butler, Julio Bragado-Young, Jeffrey Golladay, Isaac Stappas, and Kenneth Easter. The comedy of the piece is not subtle, and the dancers ate it up."
- Pillar of Fire, Dance Magazine, 02/2004: "The dancers looked in great shape--including a few I haven't yet mentioned, (...) such as Kenneth Easter, Jeffrey Golladay, Danny Tidwell, and Eric Underwood."
- Sechs Tänze, Critical Dance, 08/11/2003: "In contrast with the aggression of "Petit Mort", but with equal energy and intensity, the eight dancers (Monique Meunier, Anne Milewski, Sasha Dmochowski, Marta Rodriguez-Coca, Isaac Stappas, Jeffrey Golladay, Craig Salstien and Sascha Radetski) explored their brutal, troubled world with humor."
- Artemis, GayCityNews, 30/05/2003: "The other dancers who eloquently fulfilled Lubovitch's vision were ..Satyrs Julio bragado-Young, Jeffrey Golladay, and Craig Salstein."
- The Nutcracker, The Houston Chronicle, 26/11/2001: "Sharon Teague, Jeffrey Golladay and Lisa Kaczmarek were appealing in the Dance of the Mirlitons."
- The Long Road Home, The Houston Chronicle, 03/11/2001: "Lucas Priolo stood out in brief solo bits, as did Leticia Oliveira, Kim Wagman and Jeffrey Golladay."
- Impetuous, San Francisco Chronicle, 30/03/2000:"The rest of the cast, many of whom shone as well in the other ballets, consisted of (...) Jeffrey Golladay, Ikolo Griffin, Pablo Piantino, Mikhail Plain and Erik Wagner. Each was used sensitively, and together they moved with an equine elegance seldom seen outside the Spanish Riding School."
- Much Ado . . ., San Francisco Chronicle, 25/01/2000: "The selection at the Opera House whetted the appetite for the whole thing and shone a flattering light on one of San Francisco's most gifted young dancers, Gonzalo Garcia, backed with verve by (...) Jeff Golladay."
- Con Amore, San Francisco Chronicle, 3/08/1999: " ...the Mistress' trio of suitors were gems of dance characterization: Damian Smith as the Rake, Michael Eaton as the Sailor and Jeff Golladay as the Student.."
- Criss Cross, San Francisco Chronicle, 13/03/1999: "The ensemble, especially in the first section that included Peter Brandenhoff, Jeffrey Golladay and Gonzalo Garcia, was terrific."
- Con Amore, San Francisco Chronicle, 11/03/1999: " ...and Jeffrey Golladay -- a corps member exuberantly in line for promotion -- as the shy Student."
- The Nutcracker, San Francisco Chronicle, 22/12/1998: "Jeff Golladay squired Stephanie Orza and Kathryn Thomas through the Chinese Tea number."
- Filling Station, San Francisco Chronicle, 05/02/1998: "Every stage bit became a star turn, from Kester Cotton's spunky truck driver to Jeff Golladay's repentant Gangster."

== DVD recordings ==
- Swan Lake with Gillian Murphy and Angel Corella (American Ballet Theatre - 2005).
