= Aszure Barton =

Canadian-American choreographer

Aszure Barton is a Canadian-American dance maker. Her works have appeared on stages worldwide, including the Palais Garnier, Mariinsky Theater, The Kennedy Center, Studio 54, Lincoln Center, and Sadler’s Wells, and in exhibitions such as the Smithsonian’s Cultural Expressions. She has also choreographed for theater, film, opera, and Broadway.

In the early 2000s, Barton founded Aszure Barton & Artists (AB&A) in New York.

Barton is also presently Resident Artist at Hubbard Street Dance Chicago and House Choreographer for Gauthier Dance | Theaterhaus Stuttgart.

Barton premiered Mere Mortals at San Francisco Ballet with British musician and DJ Floating Points, longtime collaborator Michelle Jank, and mixed-media artists Hamill Industries.

She maintains an ongoing collaboration with trumpeter and composer Ambrose Akinmusire. Together, they have created a range of works, including commissions for Limón Dance Company, Hamburg Ballett, The Juilliard School, and others.

Barton returned to the Baryshnikov Arts for its 20th-anniversary season alongside Benjamin Millepied as an inaugural choreographer commissioned by the organization, in recognition of her longtime collaboration with Mikhail Baryshnikov and the Center.

Her accolades include a Bessie Award, recognition as the inaugural Martha Duffy Resident Artist at Baryshnikov Arts, and the Arts & Letters Award of Canada, joining the likes of Margaret Atwood, Karen Kain, and Oscar Peterson. A laureate of the Ken McCarter Award for Distinguished NBS Alumni, she also holds the title of Official Ambassador of Contemporary Choreography in Canada.

As an educator, Barton is Creative Partner with Boston Conservatory at Berklee and was formerly Artist-in-Residence at USC Kaufman during William Forsythe’s tenure as Artistic Advisor. She also maintains longstanding educational collaborations with Canada’s National Ballet School, Arts Umbrella, and The Juilliard School in New York.

== Career ==
Aszure Barton was born and raised in Alberta, Canada. She received her formal training at the National Ballet School in Toronto, where, as a student, she helped originate the ongoing Stephen Godfrey Choreographic Showcase. To date, she has collaborated with and created works for Mikhail Baryshnikov, Ekaterina Shipulina/Bolshoi Ballet, The National Ballet of Canada, Houston Ballet, American Ballet Theatre, The Martha Graham Dance Company, Nederlands Dans Theater, Sydney Dance Company, Ballet British Columbia, Hubbard Street Dance Chicago, The Juilliard School, Les Ballets Jazz de Montréal (Resident Choreographer 2005-08) and English National Ballet. Other work includes choreography for the Broadway revival production of The Threepenny Opera. Her work has been described as "offer[ing] an entire world, full of surprise and humor, emotion and pain, expressed through a dance vocabulary that takes ballet technique and dismantles it to near-invisibility" by the New York Times.

She is the founder and director of Aszure Barton & Artists, an international dance project, and her works continue to tour to Europe, Asia, and Africa as well as Argentina, Brazil, Canada, and the United States. She has been an artist in residence at The Baryshnikov Arts Center.

In its review of a 2011 performance, The Buffalo News says that Barton and her company "let flow wave after wave of idiosyncratic movement that vacillated from elegantly graceful to stylized clowning and the outright bizarre."
