= Mukarram Turgunbaeva =

Uzbek choreographer and dancer

- Born: 13 May [O.S. 30 April] 1913; Fergana, Fergana Oblast, Russian Empire
- Died: 26 November 1976; Tashkent, Uzbek SSR, USSR
- Citizenship: Soviet Union
- Awards: People's Artist of the USSR; USSR State Prize; Order of Lenin

Mukarram Turgunbaeva (Russian: Мукаррам Тургунбаева, Uzbek: Mukarram Turgʻunboyeva, Мукаррам Турғунбоева; 13 May [O.S. 30 April] 1913 – 26 November 1978) was an Uzbekistani choreographer and dancer of the Soviet era.

Born in Shakhrikhan in the Andijan Region, Turgunbaeva was orphaned early in life and brought up in the family of an uncle. She became interested in dance through the agency of her grandmother, and later worked as an actress in the experimental theater in Samarkand. She fused traditional Uzbek dance and western classical dance in her performances, presenting versions of each alongside one another. The choreography which she produced for many traditional dances, such as the tanovar dances, remain the standard by which other performances are judged. In 1939 she was involved in the establishment of Muqimi, the first musical theater in Uzbekistan, having previously choreographed the ballet Pakhta (Cotton) there in 1933; she also worked on Shakhida, about the battle against the basmachi, in 1938. She founded the Bahor Ensemble in 1957; still a highly regarded performing group in contemporary Uzbekistan, it credits her as the choreographer of many of its repertory pieces. For her work she was named a People's Artist of Uzbekistan. A museum dedicated to Turgunbaeva and her work exists in Tashkent. Its collections focus on dance in the 1920s and 1930s, and its exhibits present costumes, posters, and other memorabilia along with a collection of recordings of Uzbek folk music.

== Awards ==
- People's Artist of the Uzbek SSR (1937)
- People's Artist of the USSR (18 March 1959)
- Stalin Prize 2nd class (1946)
- Stalin Prize 3rd class (1951)
- USSR State Prize (1973)
- State Hamza Prize (1967)
- Order of Lenin (6 December 1951)
- Two Order of the Red Banner of Labor (31 May 1937 and 16 January 1950)
- Two Order of the Badge of Honor (1957 and 1965)
- Order of Outstanding Merit (22 August 2001)
