= Nagwa Fouad =

Egyptian belly dancer

- نجوى فؤاد
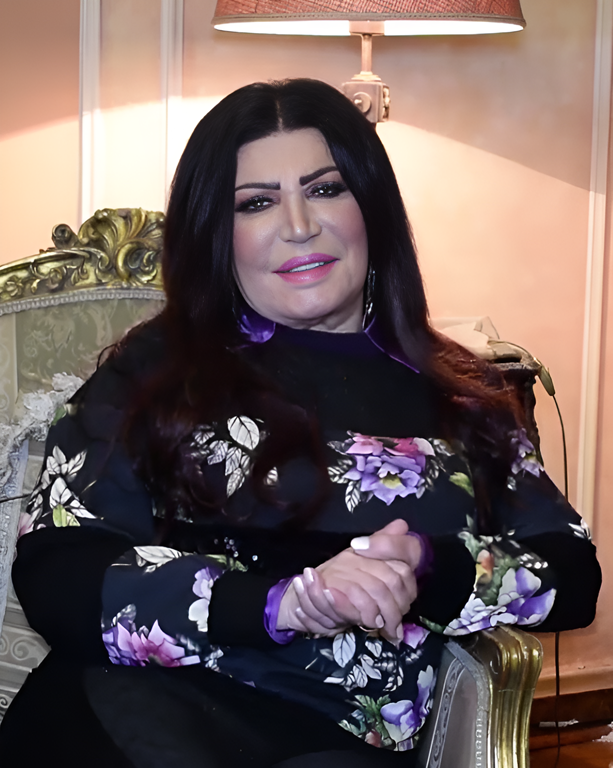
- Nagwa Fouad in 2023
- Born: Awatef Mohamed Agami; 17 January 1939 (age 87); Alexandria, Egypt
- Occupation: Actress • dancer • producer

Nagwa Fouad (Egyptian Arabic: نجوى فؤاد; born Awatef Mohamed Agami (Arabic: عواطف محمد عجمي) on 17 January 1939) is an Egyptian belly dancer and actress. She has appeared in around fifty Egyptian films.

== Early life ==
Nagwa was born as Awatef Mohamed Agami, in Alexandria to an Egyptian family from Upper Egypt. Her father was Egyptian from Upper Egypt, her mother was Palestinian.

She then changed her Egyptian folk name (Awatef) to a more artistic sounding one.

== Career ==
She began belly dancing in the early 1960s. In 1976, the composer Mohammed Abdel Wahab wrote an entire musical piece exclusively for her belly dancing show titled "Amar Arbatashar" (Full Moon (Note: Literally "moon of the 14th," used to describe beauty.)), it was her transition from traditional oriental dance to a choreographed stage performances.

After Fouad's marriage to Ahmed Fouad Hassan, the prominent Egyptian violin player, composer and conductor, she danced in the stage show Adwoua El-Madina (City Lights), which had featured such performers as Abdel Halim Hafez, Fayza Ahmed, Shadia and Sabah. Fouad featured on many of the covers of the Ahmed Fouad Hassan's albums.

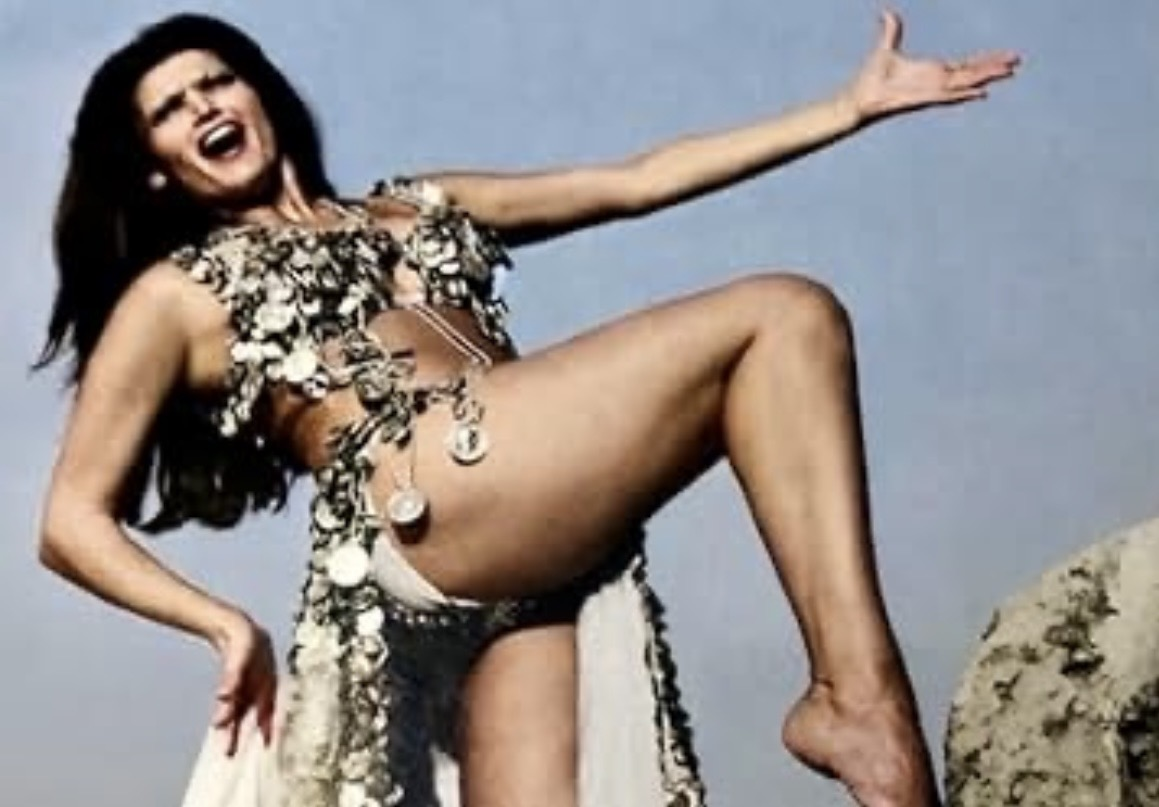
Nagwa Fouad in 1974

Fouad says: "Hassan nurtured my amateur's talents... He taught me the importance of studying and working on my talent if I wanted to be a big star." She also trained some Western dances at the Nelly Mazloum Dance School and joined the National Dance Troupe to study Western folklore with Russian teachers.

Nagwa Fouad learned showmanship and eye-catching techniques that she used in her performances of "Ayoub El-Masri" ("Ayoub, The Egyptian") and "Bahiya wa Yassin". In 1976, composer Mohamed Abdel-Wahab wrote "Qamar Arbaa-tashar" (Blue Moon or 14th moon) for her. Her stage performance to this piece allowed her to change the way belly-dancing was presented on stage, transforming it from traditional oriental dance to more of a choreographed lavish spectacle, adding more dramatic elements to it than ever before.

The composition served as a transition for Fouad: "I was able to combine the oriental dancing of Tahiya Karioka and Samia Gamal with Na'ema's acrobatic style and created a stage show like a dramatic piece" she says. Fouad offered original stage shows in five star hotels and productions for television for many years, not only in raqs sharqi, but also using inspiration from raqs sha'biyya (noted as folklore, or 'baladi') sometimes with folk singer, Fatma Serhan, and often with chorus ensembles of other dancers. Fouad established her own dance group, but it did not last long; she later tried to retire from dancing to become actress. She played on the stage and in the cinema and finally became a cinema producer.

== Political views ==
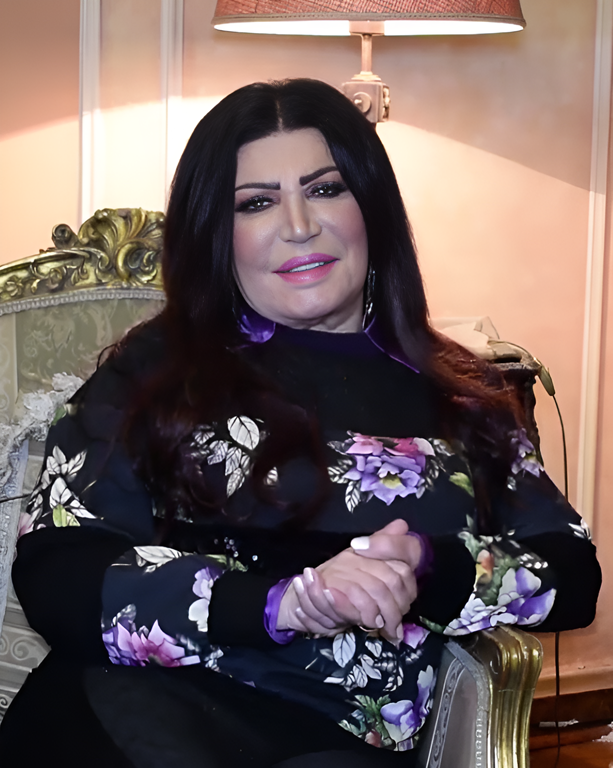
Fouad in 2023

In 2019, Fouad expressed her support for the regime of Abd al-Fattah al-Sisi.

== Famous performances ==
- 1976 Qamar Arba'tashar (Moon of the 14th). Music by prominent composer Mohammed Abdel Wahab.
