= Manuel Legris =

French ballet dancer (born 1964)

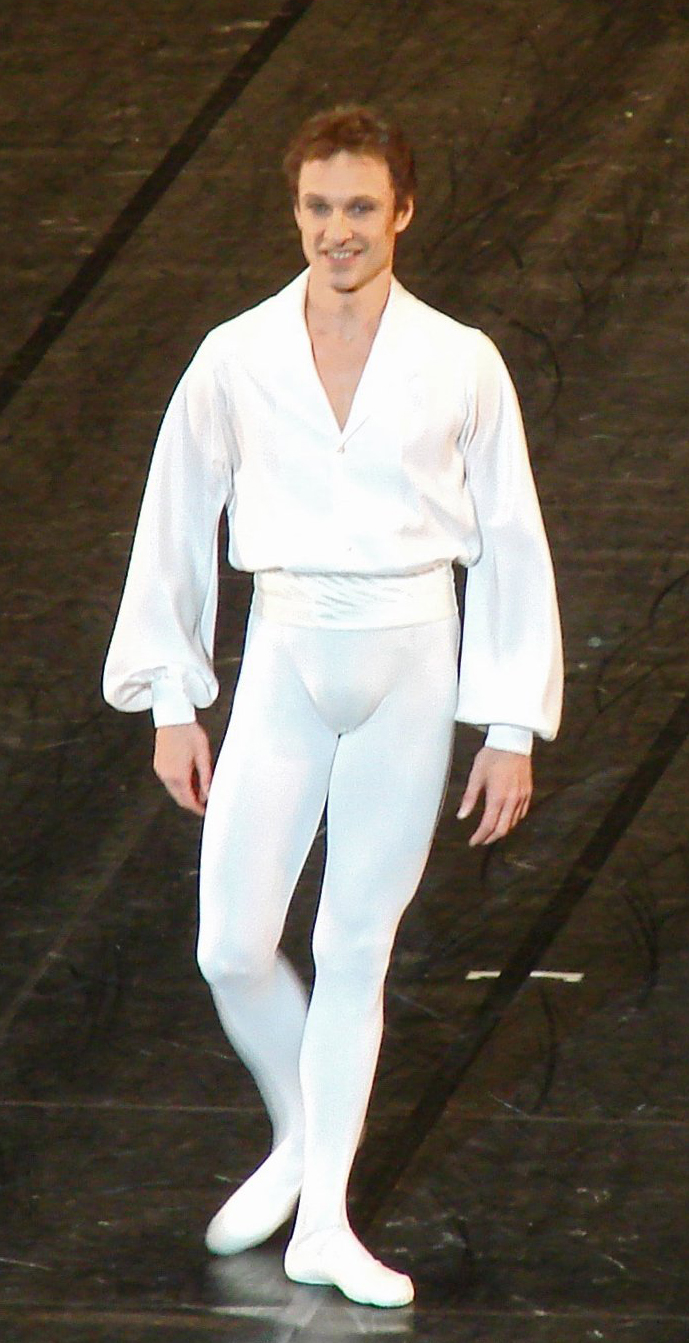
- Legris in 2009
- Born: Manuel Legris; October 10, 1964 (age 61); Paris, France
- Occupation: Principal dancer
- Years active: 1980–2009
- Career
- Former groups: Paris Opera Ballet

Manuel Legris (born 10 October 1964) is a French ballet dancer. He was a danseur étoile (principal dancer) with the Paris Opera Ballet for 23 years. On 1 September 2010, he became the director of the Vienna State Ballet. In December 2020, he was appointed artistic director of the La Scala Theatre Ballet.

== Biography ==
=== Career as a dancer ===
Legris began ballet lessons in 1973 at the age of 8 with Yvonne Guba, a local ballet teacher. He joined the Paris Opera Ballet School in 1976 and entered the corps de ballet in 1980. In 1981, he was promoted to "Coryphée," followed by a promotion to "Sujet" in 1982. On July 11, 1986, at the age of 21, Legris was named an "Étoile" by stage director Rudolf Nureyev, bypassing the rank of "Premier Danseur." On that day, the company performed Raymonda, choreographed by Nureyev, at the Metropolitan Opera in New York City, where Legris danced the leading role of Jean de Brienne.

Legris garnered attention from choreographers such as William Forsythe, John Neumeier, Jiří Kylián, and Jerome Robbins, establishing his reputation in both classical and contemporary choreography. He received invitations to perform with companies such as the Royal Ballet in London, the New York City Ballet, the Cuban National Ballet and the Tokyo Ballet, as well as the ballet companies of Monte Carlo, Stuttgart, and Hamburg. John Neumeier created Spring and Fall and A Cinderella Story specifically for him.

Legris has performed around the world, including at La Scala in Milan, the Met in New York, the Vienna State Opera Ballet, the Bolshoi Theatre in Moscow and the Mariinsky Theatre in St. Petersburg. During his tours, he partnered with dancers such as Evelyn Hart, Dominique Khalfouni, Alessandra Ferri, Lorna Feijoo, and Diana Vishneva.

In 1996, Legris founded his own dance troupe, "Manuel Legris et ses Étoiles," in collaboration with Monique Loudières.

In 2003, Legris added two major works to his repertoire: Variations on Carmen by Roland Petit and Phrases of Quartet by Maurice Béjart. That same year, Béjart restaged The Song of a Wayfarer for Legris and Laurent Hilaire, granting them exclusive performance rights.

In February 2004, Legris danced opposite Aurélie Dupont in Jiří Kylián's pas de deux Il faut qu'une porte... at the Paris Opera. He later joined Trisha Brown's O zlozony / O composite, performing alongside Dupont and Nicolas Le Riche.

In December 2005, the Stuttgart Ballet offered Legris the title role in Onegin, where he danced opposite Maria Eichwald.

On November 19, 2007, Legris performed with Dorothée Gilbert in The Nutcracker at the Paris Opera. After the performance, she was named an étoile.

Legris officially retired from the Paris Opera stage on May 15, 2009.

Since his retirement, Legris has directed the Vienna State Ballet, staging numerous productions from 2010 to 2020, including Rudolf Nureyev's Don Quixote, Onegin, and a triple bill of ballets choreographed by Jerome Robbins. After his contract ended in 2020, Legris assumed his current position as the artistic director of La Scala Theatre Ballet.

== Awards and distinctions ==
- 1984: Gold Medal at the International Dance Competition in Osaka (with Élisabeth Maurin)
- 1985: Prix Carpeaux Circle
- 1988: Nijinsky Award
- 1993: Knight of Arts and Letters
- 1998: Prix Benois de la Danse
- 1998: Officer of Arts and Letters
- 2000: Nijinsky Award (second time)
- 2001: Prix Léonide Massine
- 2002: Knight of the Order of Merit
- 2006: Knight of the Legion of Honour
- 2009: Commandeur de l'Ordre des Arts et des Lettres

== Filmography ==
- Romeo and Juliet (Rudolf Nureyev)
- Le Spectre de la Rose (Michel Fokine)
- Notre-Dame de Paris (Roland Petit)
- L'Arlésienne (Roland Petit)
- The Sleeping Beauty (Rudolf Nureyev)
- Don Quixote (Rudolf Nureyev)
- Sylvia (John Neumeier)
- Proust, ou les intermittences du coeur (Roland Petit)

== Bibliography ==
- Kishin Shinoyama, Manuel Legris à l'Opéra de Paris

== Repertory ==
- Giselle, Paquita (classic version)
- Rhapsody, Meditation (pas de deux) (Sir Frederick Ashton)
- Agon, Tchaikovsky Pas de Deux, Symphony in C, Theme and Variations, The Four Temperaments, Divertimento No. 15, Prodigal Son, Stravinsky Violin Concerto, Who Cares?, Stars and Stripes, Sonatine, Jewels (George Balanchine)
- Coppélia (Patrice Bart)
- Arepo, The Contest, The Song of a Wayfarer, Phrases Quartet (Maurice Béjart)
- Swan Lake (Vladimir Bourmeister)
- Napoli (August Bournonville)
- O złożony / O composite (Trisha Brown)
- Les Indomptés (Claude Brumachon)
- Onegin (John Cranko)
- Blues du poisson rouge (Pierre Darde)
- Giselle (Mats Ek)
- In the Middle Somewhat Elevated, Wound-Work (William Forsythe)
- Le Spectre de la rose (Michel Fokine)
- Bacchanale (Andy Degroat)
- Tantz-Schul, Sinfonietta, Clouds, Sweet Lies, Bella Figura, Il faut qu'une porte... (Jiri Kylian)
- Giselle, La Sylphide, Paquita (Pierre Lacotte)
- Études (Harald Lander)
- The Wayward Daughter (Joseph Lazzini)
- Suite en blanc, Les Mirages, Romeo and Juliet pas de deux (Lifar)
- The Story of Manon, Romeo and Juliet (Sir Kenneth MacMillan)
- A Midsummer Night's Dream, Vaslaw, Magnificat, The Nutcracker, Sylvia, Spring and Fall, A Cinderella Story (John Neumeier).
- Don Quixote, Raymonda, The Nutcracker, Swan Lake, Romeo and Juliet, The Sleeping Beauty, Cinderella, La Bayadere (Rudolf Nureyev)
- Notre-Dame de Paris, L'Arlesienne, Carmen, Les Intermittences du coeur, Cheek to Cheek, Variations from Carmen (Roland Petit)
- Le Park (Angelin Preljocaj)
- Dances at a Gathering, In The Night, The Four Seasons, A Suite of Dances, Other Dances (Jerome Robbins).
- Rules of The Game (Twyla Tharp)
- Continuo, Lilac Garden, The Leaves Are Fading (Antony Tudor)
- Four Last Songs (Rudi van Dantzig)
- Angel, Alles Walz (Renato Zanella)
- Proust ou les intermittences du coeur (Roland Petit)
