= Cedar Lake Contemporary Ballet =

Ballet company in New York City, USA

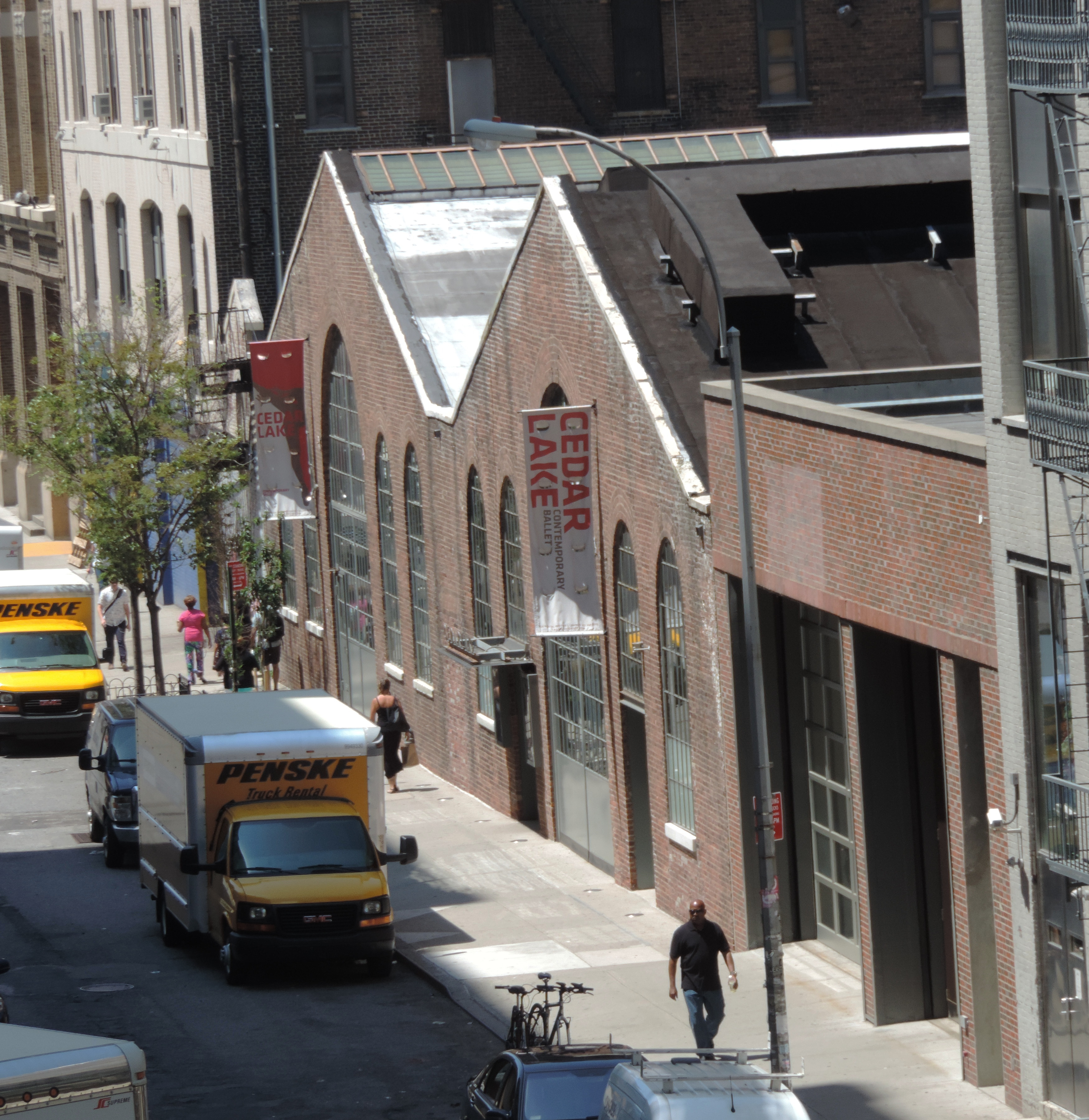
West 26th Street studio

Cedar Lake Contemporary Ballet was a New York City-based contemporary ballet company.

Cedar Lake Contemporary Ballet was founded in 2003 by Nancy Walton Laurie. It had sixteen dancers.

Cedar Lake offered a wide-ranging repertory, including works by Alexander Ekman, Jiří Kylián, Hofesh Shechter, Crystal Pite, Jacopo Godani, Angelin Preljocaj, Ohad Naharin, Didy Veldman, Jo Strømgren, Regina van Berkel and Sidi Larbi Cherkaoui.

Cedar Lake is featured in the 2011 film The Adjustment Bureau, including original choreography for the film's co-star Emily Blunt.

On March 20, 2015, artistic director Alexandra Damiani announced to the troupe that the company would close. The company concluded at Brooklyn Academy of Music in June, 2015 with a final world premiere by Richard Siegal.

== Artistic staff ==
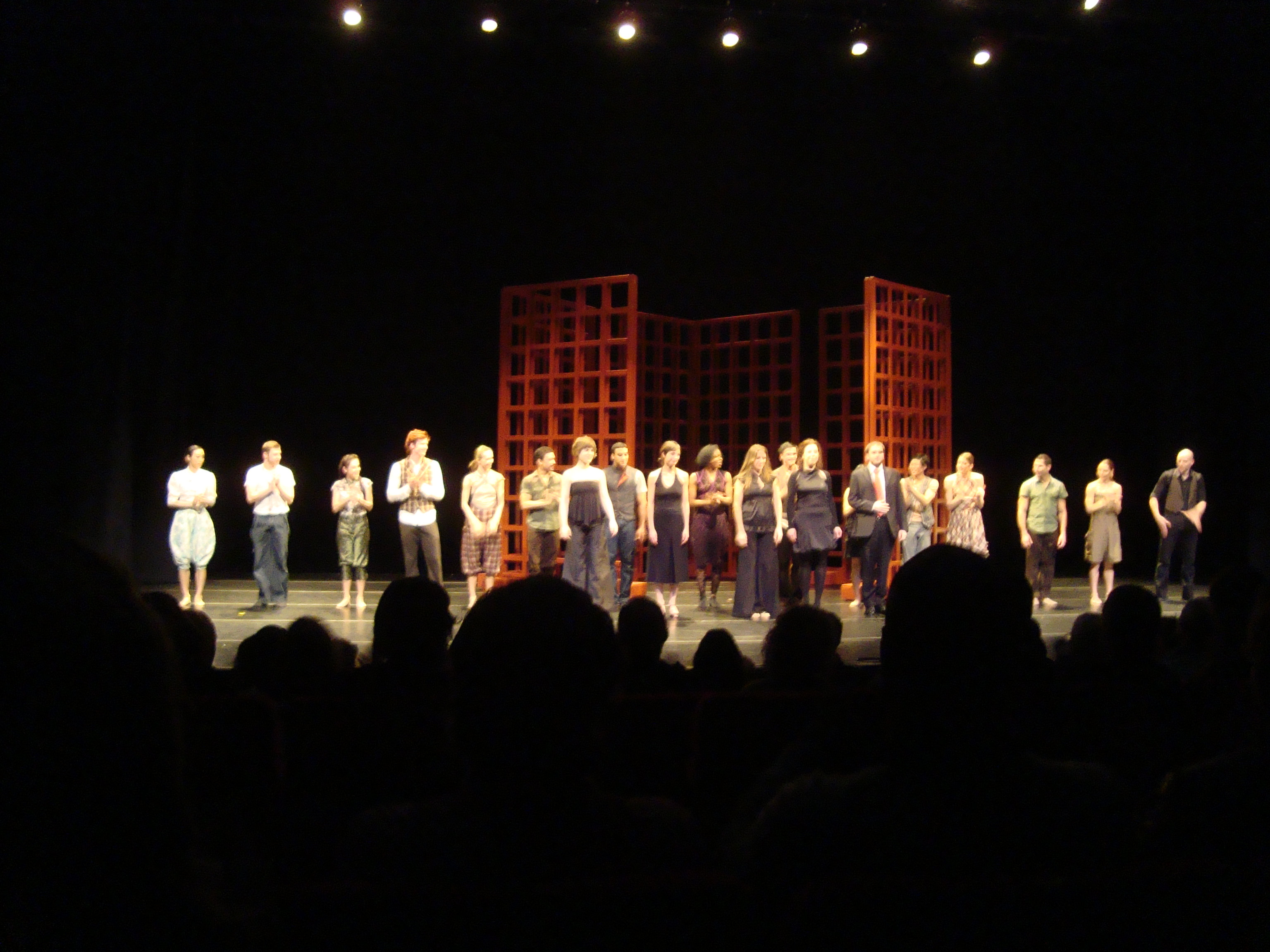
The troupe of the Cedar Lake Ballet at the end of a representation of Orbo Novo by Sidi Larbi Cherkaoui, in Rome

- Alexandra Damiani, Artistic Director
- Crystal Pite, Associate Choreographer
- Benoit-Swan Pouffer, Artistic Director (previous to Damiani)

=== Dancers included ===
- Jubal Battiste
- Jolene Baldini
- Jon Bond
- Patrick Coker (apprentice)
- Nickemil Concepcion
- Soojin Choi
- Vânia Doutel Vaz
- Daphne Fernberger (apprentice)
- Gwynenn Taylor Jones
- Jessica Lee Keller
- Jason Kittleburger
- Joseph Kudra
- Ana-Maria Lucaciu
- Navarra Novy-Williams
- Raymond Pinto
- Guillaume Quéau
- Matthew Rich
- Ida Saki
- Joaquim de Santana
- Acacia Schachte
- Billy Bell
- Rachelle Scott
- Jessica Coleman Scott
- Harumi Terayama
- Kristen Weiser
- Ebony Williams
- Jin Young Won
- Madeline Wong
