= Flight Pattern =

2017 ballet by Crystal Pite

- An image from Flight Pattern
- Choreographer: Crystal Pite
- Music: Henryk Górecki
- Premiere: 16 March 2017; Royal Opera House
- Original ballet company: The Royal Ballet
- Design: Jay Gower Taylor; Nancy Bryant; Tom Visser
- Genre: contemporary ballet

Flight Pattern is a contemporary ballet choreographed by Crystal Pite, set to the first movement of Henryk Górecki's Symphony No. 3. It premiered at the Royal Opera House, London, on 16 March 2017, making Pite the first woman to choreograph for the Royal Ballet's main stage in 18 years. The ballet won the Laurence Olivier Award for Best New Dance Production in 2018.

Flight Pattern examines the plight of refugees, drawing inspiration from 20th and 21st-century events, particularly the refugee crisis caused by the Syrian civil war. The ballet starts with 36 dancers performing on stage and becomes a series of duets and solos originated by the dancers Marcelino Sambé and Kristen McNally. The piece was mostly positively reviewed by critics, with many praising the performance of the two soloists and the choreography of the ensemble. In 2022, Pite expanded the ballet into Light of Passage, with Flight Pattern becoming the first part of the ballet. The narrative is non-linear and the movement uses lines created by the dancers' bodies and formations of queues to create tension on stage.

== Choreography ==
External videos
- An excerpt of Flight Pattern, YouTube video

Flight Pattern is a one-act contemporary ballet performed in 30 minutes. The music inspired the structure of the choreography, with a long and slow crescendo that transitions to a single voice. Crystal Pite, the choreographer of this piece, mimicked this structure in the creative process. She focused first on the large scale of the crisis, then on a singular story. Pite felt that an emotional connection with a single story would be more impactful to the audience than many dancers on stage.

The piece begins with 36 dancers arranged in three equal rows, standing in profile to the audience and staring at a light while rocking in packed rows. The dancers then move in canon, their spines extending and rotating to cause their heads to look back, then forward in a bow. Vignettes of choreography are then performed by various dancers who break away from the ensemble to perform solos, duets, or small group choreography. These include dancers who fight with each other and perform frantically in couples, a body that is left on the ground as the other dancers move forward, a man that frantically moves over the other dancers, an energetic duet with two men, and the reunion of a romantic couple. Contrasting the vignettes are the rest of the dancers, who are performing different choreography at other parts of the stage. The set then opens at the back of the stage, mimicking the entrance to a holding area in a migration centre or transportation. The dancers enter the holding area and try to find a place to sleep.

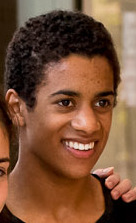
Marcelino Sambé, one of the soloists, in 2010

The dance transitions to a pas de deux originated by Marcelino Sambé and Kristen McNally. The choreography is broken up with moments of each dancer performing solo choreography, then returning to a duet. The choreography suggests that the couple have lost a child. During the couple's dance, the other performers place their coats on the female dancer, causing her to collapse. The performers enter a doorway, but the weight of the jackets prevents the female dancer from joining them and she remains on the ground, shivering. The male performer stays with her, dancing in frustration. The ballet ends with the two dancers performing together and the male soloist turning away from a closing door as the other dancers are seen darting through the opening. The final movement is of the male principal dancer placing a hand on the shoulder of the female principal dancer, with the dancer's fate left ambiguous.

The choreography incorporates a loose torso and grounded movement, which are atypical in ballet. A fluid, slow-moving motif sequence is repeated throughout the piece, becoming more elaborate in each reiteration. The dance becomes faster towards the middle of the work, incorporating dabbing and thrusting movements. Lines were commonly used on stage to create tension, with queues of dancers formed to contrast periods of waiting with other moments of the dancers getting direction from external forces. Raised arms were used to represent the wings of birds and mimic the waves of water.

== Development ==
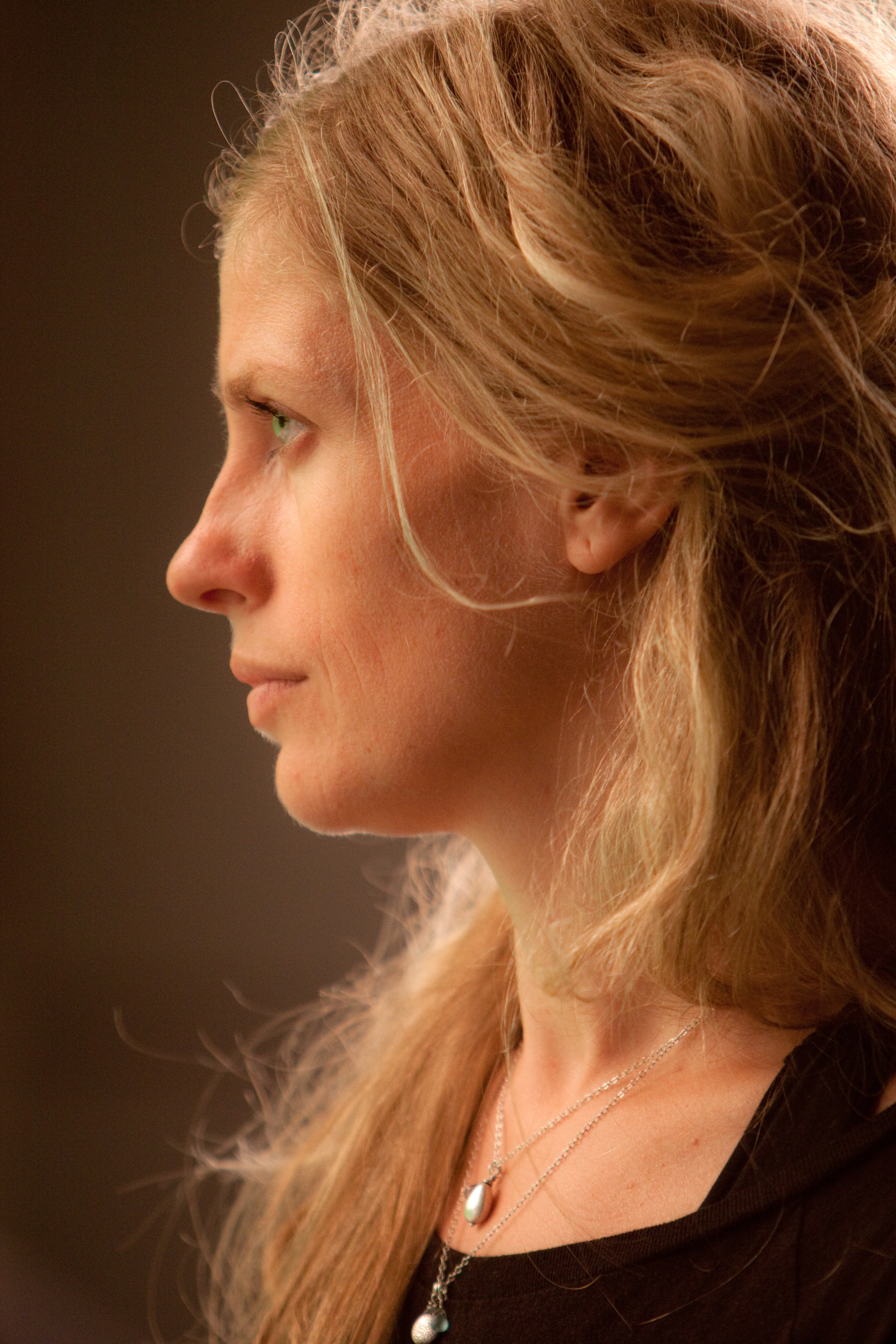
Crystal Pite, the choreographer, in 2010

The Royal Ballet commissioned what would become Flight Pattern in 2014, which was Pite's first piece for the company. While listening to possible music selections, focusing on contemporary classical music, she was thinking about the ongoing European migrant crisis. She chose to choreograph to the first movement of Henryk Górecki's Symphony No.3, also known as the Symphony of Sorrowful Songs. Pite associated the music with the migrant crisis, for which she was "disappointed" with the international response, and on choreographing a ballet about the crisis, she said it was her "way of coping with the world at the moment". The theme and music were selected approximately one and a half years before the first rehearsal and was the starting point for Pite's creative process.

Pite chose to work with a large ensemble for this piece to showcase complex choreography with simpler movement. At the beginning of the creation process, Pite created movement phrases before the rehearsals and taught them to the dancers; Lucía Piquero Álvarez, a professor at the University of Malta, speculated in her analysis of the piece that the motif sequence was taught during this time.

Nancy Bryant designed identical grey costumes in the performance; the dancers begin wearing grey coats, but these are later taken off to reveal grey vests and loose trousers underneath. Jay Gower Taylor designed the sets, with dark panels that open and close throughout the performance and manipulate the shape of the stage. Tom Visser was the lighting designer, using dark lighting except at the end when a column of light shines between two walls.

== Performances ==
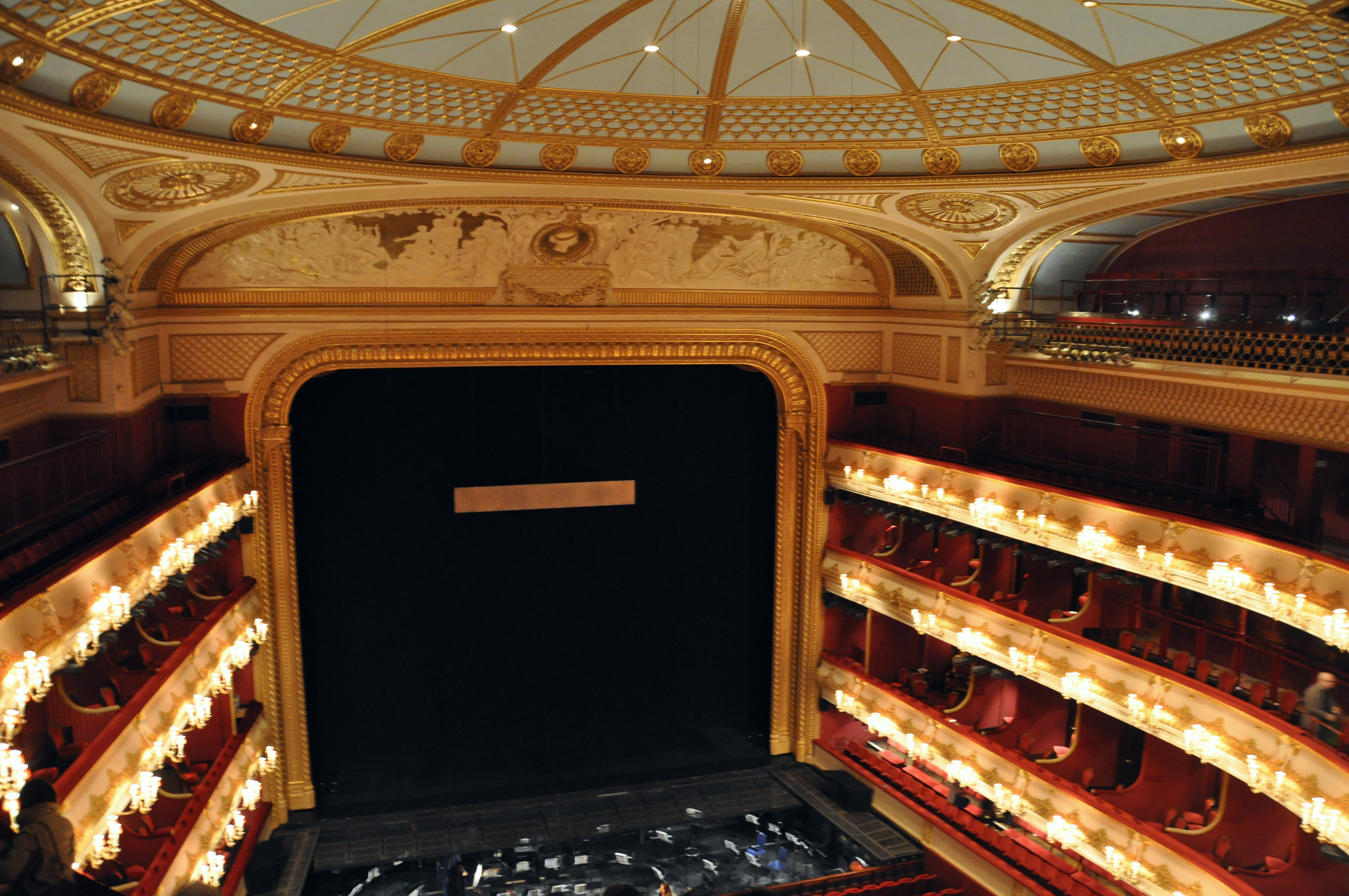
Auditorium of the Royal Opera House

Flight Pattern premiered on 16 March 2017 at the Royal Opera House in London. The piece was performed as the first ballet of a triple bill that also consisted of The Human Seasons by David Dawson and After the Rain by Christopher Wheeldon. It finished its original run on 24 March. In its original run, Koen Kessels conducted the orchestra and Francesca Chiejina was a featured soloist for the music, singing soprano.

Flight Pattern was revived in May 2019, with McNally and Sambé reprising their roles. It was performed as the third act in a triple bill, succeeding the choreographer Sidi Larbi Cherkaoui's Medusa and Wheeldon's Within the Golden Hour. A performance was recorded and published on the Royal Ballet website, and available for purchase until December 2020.

After finishing choreographing Flight Pattern, Pite was invited by Kevin O'Hare, the director of the Royal Ballet, to choreograph other new works for the company. Instead, Pite stated that she wanted to extend the piece by choreographing to the rest of Górecki's symphony. Production of the piece was delayed due to the COVID-19 pandemic and subsequent lockdowns. In 2022, this extended work premiered as Light of Passage, with Flight Pattern incorporated as the first part of the ballet. This was Pite's first full-length work for the Royal Ballet.

== Themes and analysis ==
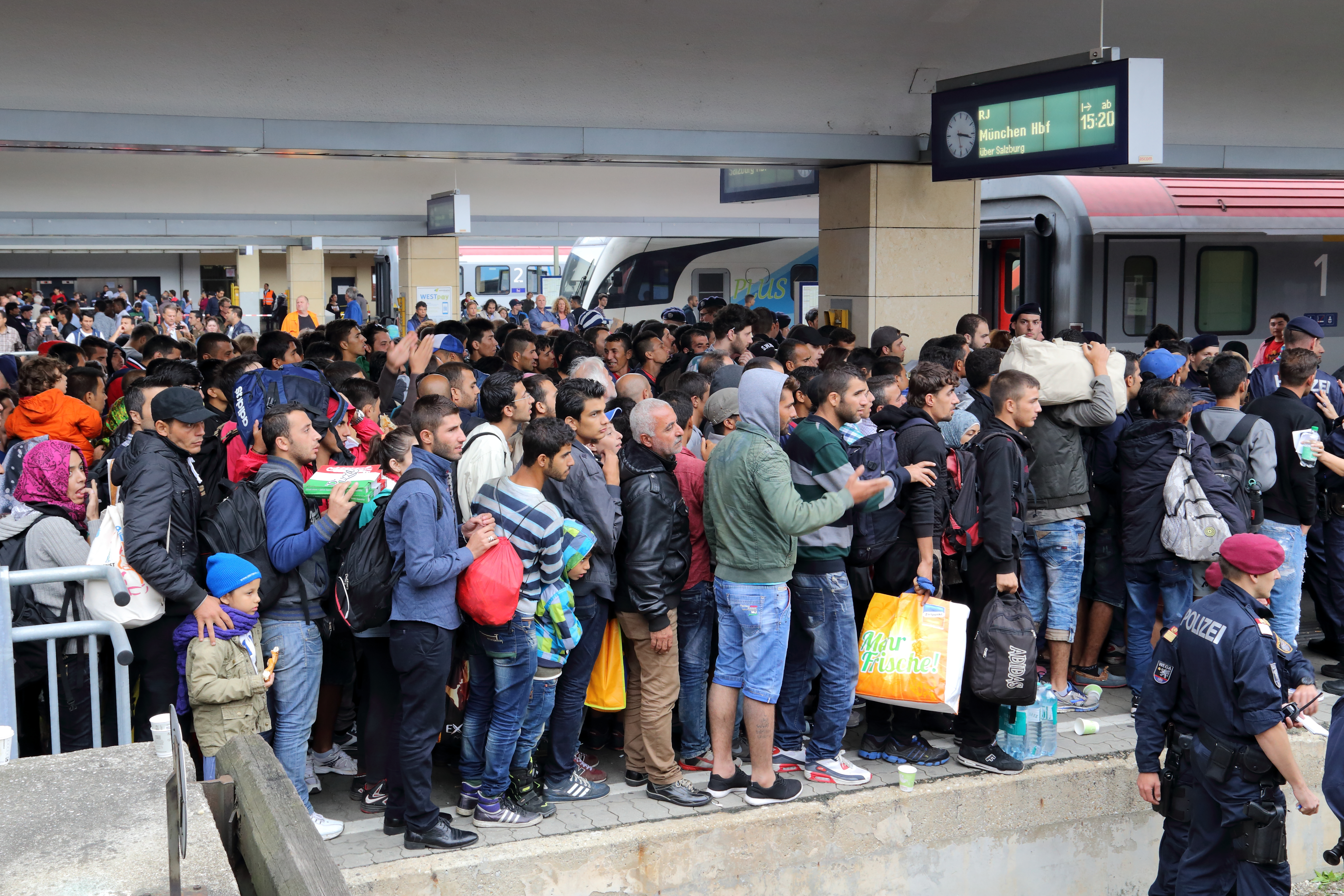
Refugees travelling, the theme of the ballet, here waiting at a train station in Vienna

The theme of Flight Pattern is the plight of displaced persons as they travel between locations. While getting inspiration from conflicts from the past century, particularly the influx of refugees to Europe during the 2010s, it did not place its dancers in a specific time or location. Instead, the dancers are an allegory for the experience of displaced persons. The subject matter is conventional for dance pieces in the Western world, showcasing people outside of the hierarchies of power as performers dancing in a stylized manner. The uniformity of the grey costumes evoked a setting of a prison or battlefield, with the dancers under the control of a more powerful entity, even though a specific antagonist is not named or explored in the narrative. By not placing the piece narratively in a specific historical setting, the piece avoided themes on the racialization of refugees or the relationship between colonialization and displaced persons.

The narrative is non-linear, particularly in the first part of the piece, where multiple story arcs are shown simultaneously on stage. Narratives include looking for people in a queue, rocking a baby, and bodies left behind as the crowd moves to a new location. In some sections, dancers perform together, representing refugees as a single body of people moving as a group. A motif in the work is dancers with outstretched arms, suggesting they have reached their physical limitations.

The movement incorporated realistic human gestures and fantastical, emotional extremes with animalistic qualities. The first section of the dance contains motifs of suspensions of weight or unbalanced spins. The dancers often gaze upwards towards something too far to reach. The duet between the two principal dancers shows the journey of a female character who starts as a mother providing support to her child, and then acts similarly to a baby who needs support. The baby's presence represents an anchor baby, whose birth allows the child to become rooted in their new location while the rest of the group is still transient. The mother shows a vulnerable person who is exhausted and hungry. The emotions displayed in the piece are developed from the tension created by the story, movement quality, music, and spacing between the dancers.

== Critical reviews ==
Professional ratings
Review scores
Source	Rating
Evening Standard	5/5 stars
The Guardian (2017 review)	4/5 stars
The Guardian (2020 review)	5/5 stars
The Independent	4/5 stars
The Daily Telegraph	4/5 stars

Flight Pattern received mostly positive reviews. Pite's choreography of the 36 dancers was described by Graham Watts in Bachtrack as "beautiful" and Martha Schabas in The Globe and Mail as a "visually breathtaking work of art". Reviewers differed on the emotional impact of the piece: some thought it was impactful and that the choreography avoided abstract and metaphorical movement to a positive effect while others felt the choreography was simplistic and sanitised, melodramatic, or lacked the depth of her previous work. Sambé's performance "exuded fluency and naturalness" according to Watts whilst other reviewers praised the decision to cast McNally, an experienced performer, as a soloist.

Reviewers highlighted the 18-year gap since the Royal Ballet commissioned work from a female choreographer. They also pointed out that Flight Pattern's contemporary ballet style is different from the classical ballet that the company often performs in its repertoire and from the other dances performed in the same program. Luke Jennings, writing for The Guardian, stated that Flight Pattern had an inquiry and feeling that was missing from the other, classical pieces. Kat Lister wrote in The Independent that the performance at Royal Opera House, a location considered a classical venue, made the piece more impactful to the audience. The subject matter of the choreography, highlighting the European migrant crisis, was also questioned by some reviewers, who felt that the topic negatively distracted from the artistic achievements of the ballet.

== Awards and nominations ==
Year	Award	Category	Recipients and nominees	Result	Ref.
2017	National Dance Awards	Best Classical Choreography	Crystal Pite	Nominated	
2017	National Dance Awards	Outstanding Female Performance (Classical)	Kristen McNally	Nominated	
2018	Laurence Olivier Awards	Best New Dance Production	Flight Pattern	Won	
