= Laurence Olivier Award for Best New Dance Production =

Annual award for London theatre

- Awarded for: Best New Dance Production
- Location: England
- Presented by: Society of London Theatre
- First award: 1983
- Currently held by: Into the Hairy (2026)
- Website: officiallondontheatre.com/olivier-awards/

The Laurence Olivier Award for Best New Dance Production is an annual award presented by the Society of London Theatre in recognition of the "world-class status of London theatre." The awards were established as the Society of West End Theatre Awards in 1976, and renamed in 1984 in honour of English actor and director Laurence Olivier.

This award was first presented in 1983, as Outstanding New Dance Production of the Year. After the 1985 presentation, the award was set aside from 1986 to 1992, returning in 1993 under its current name.

== Winners and nominees ==
=== 1980s ===
Year	Production	Company
1983
1983	Requiem	The Royal Ballet
1983	Glass Pieces	New York City Ballet
1983	The Nightingale	Royal Opera
1983	Nijinsky the Fool	Lindsay Kemp
1984
1984	Giselle	Dance Theatre of Harlem
1984	Consort Lessons	The Royal Ballet
1984	Intimate Pages	Ballet Rambert
1984	Metamorphosis	Sadler's Wells Royal Ballet
1985
1985	Pictures	Merce Cunningham
1985	Romeo and Juliet	London Festival Ballet
1985	The Sons of Horus	The Royal Ballet
1985	The Wand of Youth	Sadler's Wells Royal Ballet

=== 1990s ===
Year	Production	Company
1993
1993	The Judas Tree	The Royal Ballet
1993	Catalyst	The Australian Ballet
1993	Les Patineurs, The Witch Boy and Donizetti Variations	London City Ballet
1993	Winnsboro Cotton Mill Blues	Rambert Dance Company
1994
1994	Choreartium	Birmingham Royal Ballet
1994	Herman Schmerman	The Royal Ballet
1994	Nutcracker!	Adventures in Motion Pictures
1994	Romeo and Juliet	Birmingham Royal Ballet
1995
1995	Fearful Symmetries	The Royal Ballet
1995	Hommage Aux Ballets Russes	Le Ballet Preljocaj
1995	The Nutcracker	Birmingham Royal Ballet
1995	Suenos Flamencos	Ballet Cristina Hoyos
1996
1996	Swan Lake	Adventures in Motion Pictures
1996	Saints and Shadows	Arc Dance Company
1996	SH-BOOM	10 Dancers Ensemble
1996	Who Cares?	Les Ballets de Monte Carlo
1997
1997	Cinderella	English National Ballet
1997	Alice in Wonderland	English National Ballet
1997	Carmina Burana	Birmingham Royal Ballet
1998
1998	L'Allegro, il Penseroso ed il Moderato	Mark Morris Dance Group, English National Opera in association with Dance Umbrella
1998	The Nutcracker Sweeties	Birmingham Royal Ballet
1998	Swan Lake	English National Ballet
1999
1999	Enemy in the Figure	Ballett Frankfurt
1999	The Man with a Moustache and Room of Cooks	City of London Ballet and The Royal Ballet
1999	We Set Out Early...Visibility was Poor	Bill T. Jones/Arnie Zane Dance Company

=== 2000s ===
Year	Production	Company
2000
2000	Symphony of Psalms	Nederlands Dans Theater I
2000	Sandpiper Ballet	San Francisco Ballet
2000	The Cage	San Francisco Ballet
2000	Viktor	Tanztheater Wuppertal Pina Bausch
2001
2001	Le Jardin Io Io Ito Ito	Compagnie Montalvo-Hervieu
2001	Indigo Rose	NDT II
2001	Mellantid	NDT II
2001	Mozartina	Zurich Ballet
2002
2002	Hibiki	Sankai Juku
2002	Eidos: Telos	Ballett Frankfurt
2002	Live	Dutch National Ballet
2002	Onegin	The Royal Ballet
2003
2003	Polyphonia	Danses Concertantes
2003	Rain (ballet)	Rosas
2003	Rome and Jewels	Rennie Harris Puremovement
2003	Tryst	The Royal Ballet
2004
2004	Broken Fall	George Piper Dances in association with The Royal Opera
2004	Dream Play	Nederlands Dans Theater II
2004	Mesmerics	George Piper Dances
2004	Promethean Fire	Paul Taylor Dance Company
2005
2005	Swamp	Rambert Dance Company
2005	A Midsummer Night's Dream	Northern Ballet Theatre
2005	Milagros	Royal New Zealand Ballet
2005	Romeo and Juliet	Royal New Zealand Ballet
2006
2006	PUSH	Sylvie Guillem and Russell Maliphant
2006	Constant Speed	Rambert Dance Company
2006	Giselle	Fabulous Beast Dance Theatre
2006	Zero Degrees	Akram Khan/Sidi Larbi Cherkaoui/Antony Gormley/Nitin Sawhney
2007
2007	Chroma	The Royal Ballet
2007	The Sleeping Beauty	The Royal Ballet
2007	Fuji Musume and Kasane	Kabuki
2007	DGV: Danse à Grande Vitesse	The Royal Ballet
2008
2008	Jewels	The Royal Ballet
2008	The Bull	Fabulous Beast Dance Theatre
2008	Mozart Dances	Mark Morris Dance Group
2008	The Three Musketeers	Northern Ballet Theatre
2009
2009	Café Müller and The Rite of Spring	Tanztheater Wuppertal Pina Bausch
2009	Impressing the Czar	Royal Ballet of Flanders
2009	Infra	The Royal Ballet
2009	To Be Straight with You	DV8 Physical Theatre

=== 2010s ===
Year	Production	Company
2010
2010	Goldberg	The Brandstrup/Rojo Project
2010	Afterlight	Russell Maliphant
2010	E=MC²	Birmingham Royal Ballet
2010	A Linha Curva	Rambert Dance Company
2010	The Rite of Spring	Fabulous Beast Dance Theatre
2011
2011	Babel (Words)	Sidi Larbi Cherkaoui and Damien Jalet
2011	Mambo 3XX1	Danza Contemporanea de Cuba
2011	Cinderella	New Adventures
2012
2012	DESH	Akram Khan Company
2012	Gardenia	Les Ballets C de la B
2012	The Metamorphosis	Arthur Pita
2012	Some Like It Hip Hop	ZooNation
2013
2013	Aeternum	The Royal Ballet
2013	Cacti	Nederlands Dans Theater II
2013	A Streetcar Named Desire	Scottish Ballet
2014
2014	Puz/zle	Eastman - Sidi Larbi Cherkaoui and Sadler's Wells
2014	Barbican Britten: Phaedra	Richard Alston Dance Company and Britten Sinfonia
2014	What's Become of You? (Questcequetudeviens?)	Aurélien Bory and Stéphanie Fuster
2015
2015	32 rue Vandenbranden	Peeping Tom
2015	Juliet and Romeo	Royal Swedish Ballet
2015	Tabac Rouge	La Compagnie du Hanneton/James Thierrée
2016
2016	Woolf Works	Wayne McGregor for The Royal Ballet
2016	He Who Falls (Celui Qui Tombe)	Compagnie Yoann Bourgeois
2016	Roméo et Juliette	Les Ballets de Monte Carlo
2017
2017	Betroffenheit	Crystal Pite and Jonathon Young for Sadler's Wells
2017	Blak Whyte Gray	Boy Blue Entertainment
2017	Giselle	Akram Khan and English National Ballet
2017	My Mother, My Dog, and CLOWNS!	Michael Clark
2018
2018	Flight Pattern	Crystal Pite
2018	Goat	Ben Duke for Rambert Dance Company
2018	Grand Finale	Hofesh Shechter
2018	Trees Of Codes	Wayne McGregor and the Paris Opera Ballet
2019
2019	Blkdog	Botis Seva
2019	16 + A Room/Solo Echo/Bill	Ballet British Columbia
2019	Playlist (Track 1, 2)	William Forsythe
2019	The Unknown Soldier	Alastair Marriott

=== 2020s ===
Year	Production	Company
2020
2020	Ingome	Mthuthuzeli November and Ballet Black
2020	La Fiesta	Israel Galván
2020	Mám	Michael Keegan-Dolan and Teaċ Daṁsa
2020	Vessel	Damien Jalet and Kohei Nawa
2021	Not presented due to extended closing of theatre productions during COVID-19 pandemic (Note: Due to late March 2020 to late July 2021 closing of London theatre productions during the COVID-19 pandemic in England, the 2022 awards recognise productions that launched anytime from February 2020 to February 2022)	
2022
2022	Revisor	Crystal Pite and Jonathon Young / Kidd Pivot
2022	Draw From Within	Wim Vandekeybus - Rambert Dance Company
2022	Transverse Orientation	Dimitris Papaioannou
2023
2023	Traplord	Ivan Michael Blackstock
2023	Light of Passage	Crystal Pite for The Royal Ballet
2023	Pasionaria	La Veronal
2023	Triptych (The Missing Door, The Lost Room, and the Hidden Floor)	Peeping Tom
2024
2024	La Ruta	Gabriela Carrizo, part of Nederlands Dans Theater - NDT1
2024	Broken Chord	Gregory Maqoma & Thuthuka Sibisi
2024	The Rite of Spring	Seeta Patel
2024	Time Spell	Michelle Dorrance, Jillian Meyers & Tiler Peck, part of Turn It Out with Tiler Peck & Friends
2025
2025	Assembly Hall	Kidd Pivot, Crystal Pite & Jonathon Young
2025	Frontiers: Choreographers of Canada - Pite/Kudelka/Portner	The National Ballet of Canada
2025	Theatre of Dreams	Hofesh Shechter Company
2025	An Untitled Love	A.I.M by Kyle Abraham
