= 2015 Laurence Olivier Awards =

Award ceremony

- Date: 12 April 2015
- Location: Royal Opera House
- Hosted by: Lenny Henry

Television/radio coverage
- Network: ITV

The 2015 Laurence Olivier Awards were held on Sunday 12 April 2015 at the Royal Opera House, London. The ceremony was hosted by Lenny Henry. A highlights show was shown on ITV shortly after the live event ended.

== Gallery ==
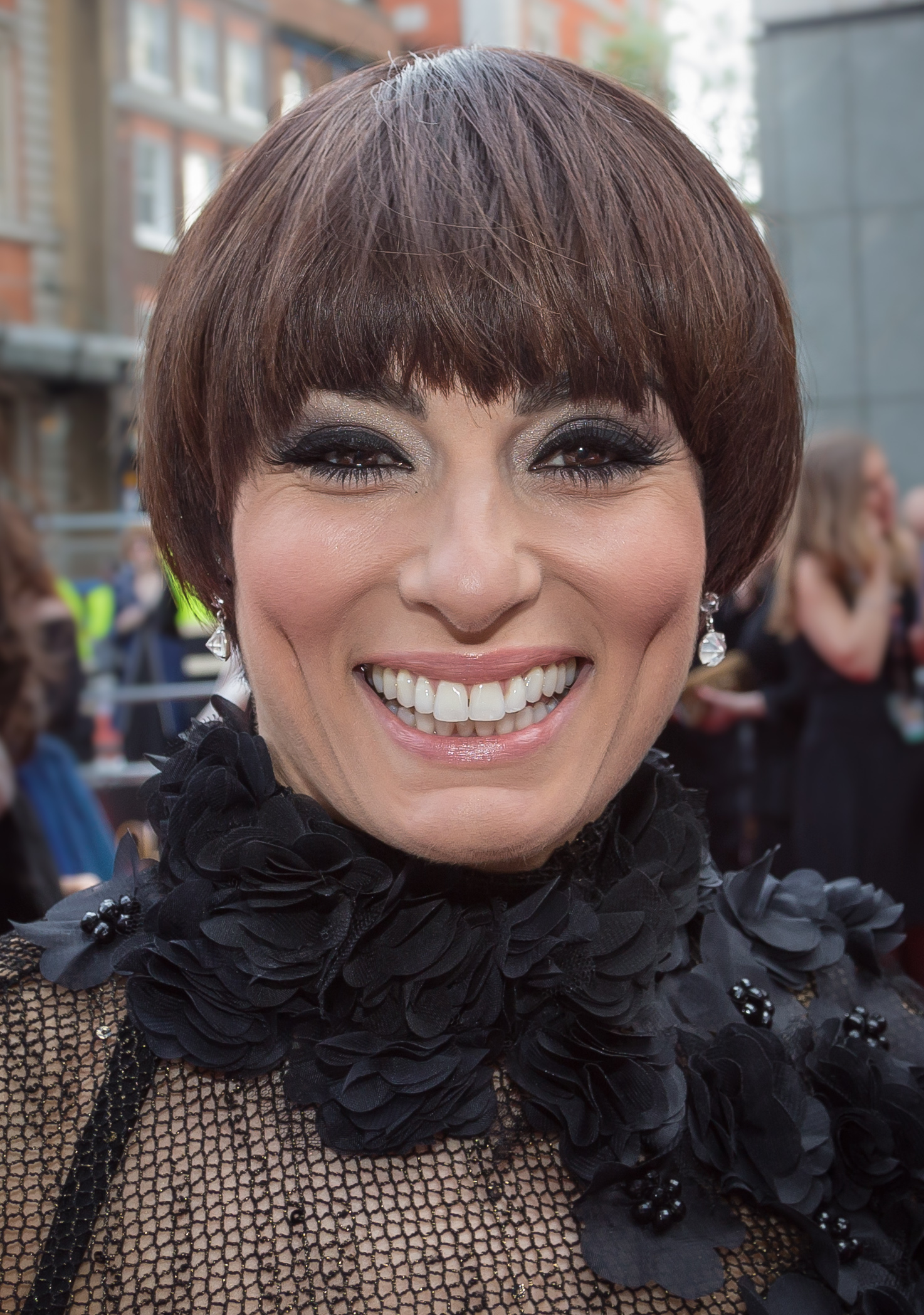
Flavia Cacace

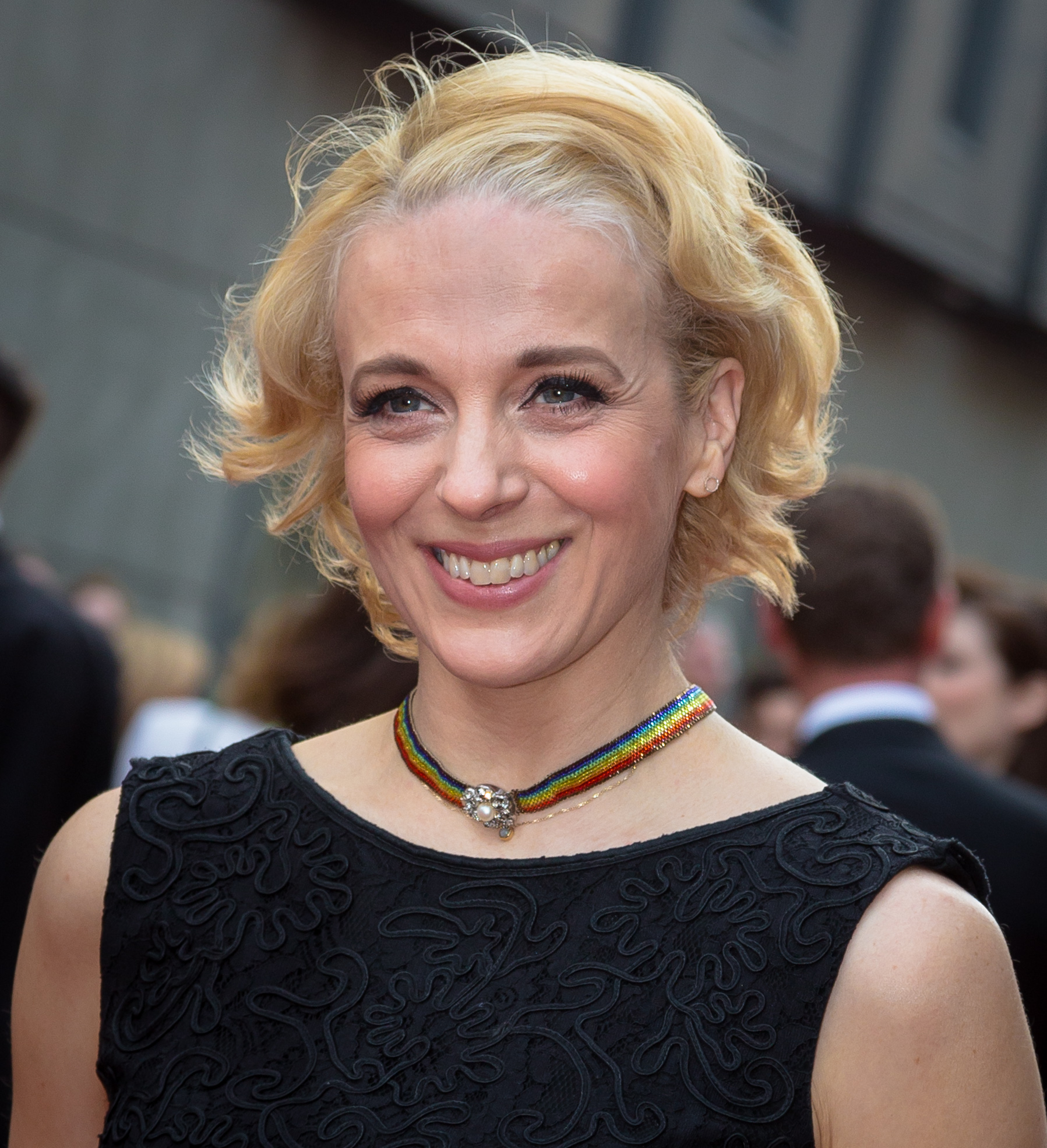
Amanda Abbington

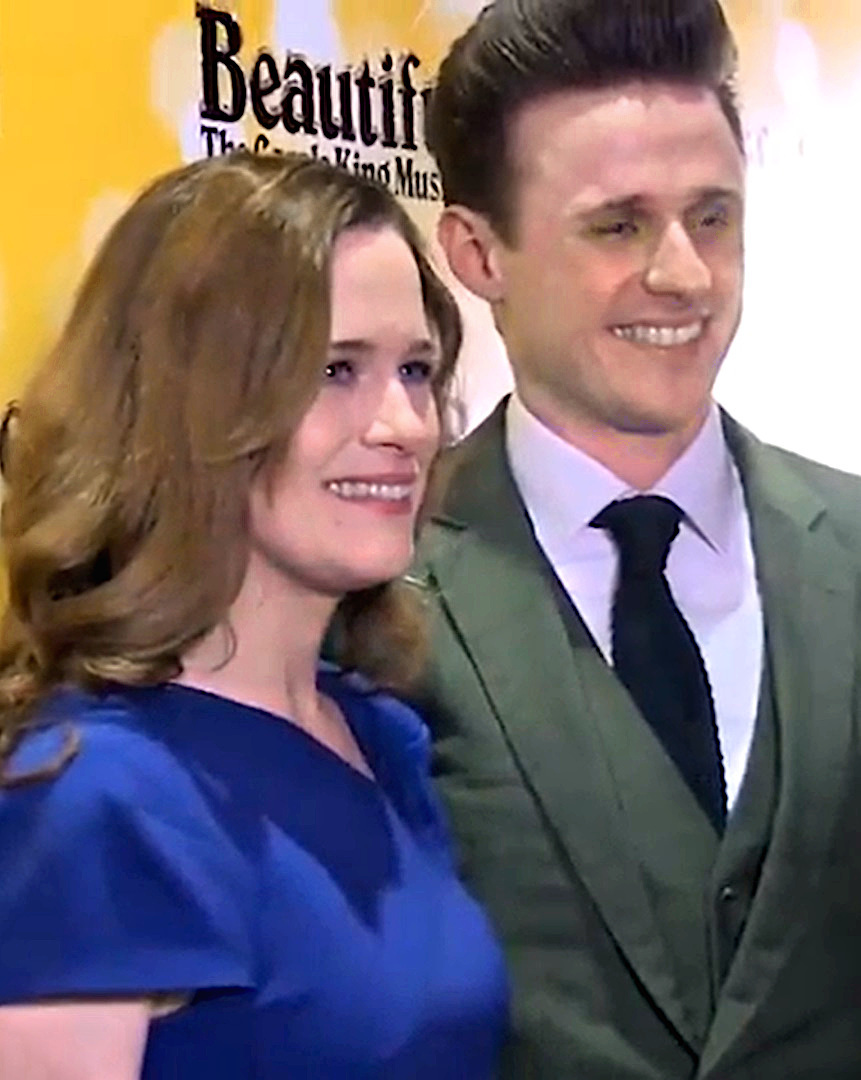
Katie Brayben in 2015

== Eligibility ==
Any new production that opened between 26 February 2014 and 25 February 2015 in a theatre represented in membership of the Society of London Theatre was eligible for consideration, provided it had performed at least 30 performances.

== Event calendar ==
- 17 February: Voting opens for the Audience Award for Most Popular Show's first round (by the general public)
- 26 February: Kevin Spacey is announced as a recipient of the Special Award
- 5 March: Voting closes for the Audience Award's first round
- 9 March: Nominations announced by Lesley Manville and James McAvoy (Audience Award round two voting opens to the general public)
- 18 March: Sylvie Guillem is announced as a recipient of the Special Award
- 10 April: Voting closes for the Audience Award's final round
- 12 April: Award ceremony held

== Winners and nominees ==
The nominations were announced on 9 March 2015 in 28 categories.

Best New Play	Best New Musical
King Charles III by Mike Bartlett – Almeida / Wyndham's; Taken at Midnight by Mark Hayhurst – Theatre Royal Haymarket; The Nether by Jennifer Haley – Duke of York's; Wolf Hall and Bring up the Bodies by Hilary Mantel, adapted by Mike Poulton – Aldwych	Sunny Afternoon – Hampstead / Harold Pinter; Beautiful – Aldwych; Here Lies Love – National Theatre Dorfman; Memphis – Shaftesbury
Best Revival	Best Musical Revival
A View from the Bridge – Young Vic / Wyndham's; A Streetcar Named Desire – Young Vic; My Night with Reg – Donmar Warehouse / Apollo; Skylight – Wyndham's; The Crucible – Old Vic	City of Angels – Donmar Warehouse; Cats – London Palladium; Miss Saigon – Prince Edward; Porgy and Bess – Regent's Park Open Air
Best New Comedy	Best Entertainment and Family
The Play That Goes Wrong by Henry Lewis, Jonathan Sayer and Henry Shields – Duchess; Handbagged by Moira Buffini – Vaudeville; Shakespeare in Love by Marc Norman / Tom Stoppard, adapted by Lee Hall – Noël Coward	La Soirée – La Soirée Spiegeltent; Dance 'til Dawn – Aldwych; Hetty Feather – Vaudeville
Best Actor	Best Actress
Mark Strong as Eddie Carbone in A View from the Bridge – Young Vic / Wyndham's; Richard Armitage as John Proctor in The Crucible – Old Vic; James McAvoy as Jack Gurney in The Ruling Class – Trafalgar Studio 1; Tim Pigott-Smith as King Charles III in King Charles III – Almeida / Wyndham's	Penelope Wilton as Irmgard Litten in Taken at Midnight – Theatre Royal Haymarket; Gillian Anderson as Blanche DuBois in A Streetcar Named Desire – Young Vic; Kristin Scott Thomas as Electra in Electra – Old Vic; Imelda Staunton as Margie Walsh in Good People – Hampstead / Noël Coward
Best Actor in a Musical	Best Actress in a Musical
John Dagleish as Ray Davies in Sunny Afternoon – Hampstead / Harold Pinter; Jon Jon Briones as The Engineer in Miss Saigon – Prince Edward; Brandon Victor Dixon as Haywood Patterson in The Scottsboro Boys – Garrick; Killian Donnelly as Huey Calhoun in Memphis – Shaftesbury	Katie Brayben as Carole King in Beautiful – Aldwych; Gemma Arterton as Rita O'Grady in Made in Dagenham – Aldelphi; Tamsin Greig as Pepa Marcos in Women on the Verge of a Nervous Breakdown – Playhouse; Beverley Knight as Felicia Farrell in Memphis – Shaftesbury
Best Actor in a Supporting Role	Best Actress in a Supporting Role
Nathaniel Parker as Henry VIII of England in Wolf Hall and Bring up the Bodies – Aldwych; David Calder as Doyle in The Nether – Duke of York's; Richard Goulding as Prince Harry in King Charles III – Almeida / Wyndham's; John Light as Dr Conrad in Taken at Midnight – Theatre Royal Haymarket	Angela Lansbury as Madame Arcati in Blithe Spirit – Gielgud; Jaime Adler, Zoe Brough, Perdita Hibbins and Isabella Pappas as Iris in The Nether – Duke of York's; Phoebe Fox as Catherine Carbone in A View from the Bridge – Young Vic / Wyndham's; Lydia Wilson as Princess Kate in King Charles III – Almeida / Wyndham's
Best Actor in a Supporting Role in a Musical	Best Actress in a Supporting Role in a Musical
George Maguire as Dave Davies in Sunny Afternoon – Hampstead / Harold Pinter; Rolan Bell as Delray in Memphis – Shaftesbury; Ian McIntosh as Barry Mann in Beautiful – Aldwych; Jason Pennycooke as Bobby in Memphis – Shaftesbury	Lorna Want as Cynthia Weil in Beautiful – Aldwych; Samantha Bond as Muriel Eubanks in Dirty Rotten Scoundrels – Savoy; Haydn Gwynne as Lucia in Women on the Verge of a Nervous Breakdown – Playhouse; Nicole Scherzinger as Grizabella in Cats – London Palladium
Best Director	Best Theatre Choreographer
Ivo van Hove for A View from the Bridge – Young Vic / Wyndham's; Rupert Goold for King Charles III – Almeida / Wyndham's; Jeremy Herrin for Wolf Hall and Bring up the Bodies – Aldwych; Josie Rourke for City of Angels – Donmar Warehouse	Sergio Trujillo for Memphis – Shaftesbury; Jerry Mitchell for Dirty Rotten Scoundrels – Savoy; Annie-B Parson for Here Lies Love – National Theatre Dorfman; Josh Prince for Beautiful – Aldwych
Best Set Design	Best Costume Design
Es Devlin for The Nether – Duke of York's; Bunny Christie for Made in Dagenham – Aldelphi; Robert Jones for City of Angels – Donmar Warehouse; Jan Versweyveld for A View from the Bridge – Young Vic / Wyndham's	Christopher Oram for Wolf Hall and Bring up the Bodies – Aldwych; Robert Jones for City of Angels – Donmar Warehouse; Paul Tazewell for Memphis – Shaftesbury; Alejo Vietti for Beautiful – Aldwych
Best Lighting Design	Best Sound Design
Howard Harrison for City of Angels – Donmar Warehouse; Jon Clark for King Charles III – Almeida / Wyndham's; Paule Constable / David Plater for Wolf Hall and Bring up the Bodies – Aldwych; Jan Versweyveld for A View from the Bridge – Young Vic / Wyndham's	Gareth Owen for Memphis – Shaftesbury; Tom Gibbons for A View from the Bridge – Young Vic / Wyndham's; Matt McKenzie for Sunny Afternoon – Hampstead / Harold Pinter; Brian Ronan for Beautiful – Aldwych
Outstanding Achievement in Music
Ray Davies for lyricising and scoring Sunny Afternoon – Hampstead / Harold Pinter; David Bryan for lyricising and scoring, Joe DiPietro for lyricising and writing, Tim Sutton for music directing and the band for Memphis – Shaftesbury; David Byrne for conceiving, lyricising and scoring and Fatboy Slim for scoring Here Lies Love – National Theatre Dorfman; The orchestra for Beautiful – Aldwych
Outstanding Achievement in Dance	Best New Dance Production
Crystal Pite for choreographing A Picture of You Falling, The Tempest Replica and Polaris, The Associates – Sadler's Wells; Rocío Molina in Bosque Ardora, Dance Umbrella – Barbican; The Elders Project, Elixir Festival – Sadler's Wells; Christopher Wheeldon for choreographing The Winter's Tale, The Royal Ballet – Royal Opera House	32 rue Vandenbranden, Peeping Tom – Barbican; Juliet and Romeo, Royal Swedish Ballet – Sadler's Wells; Tabac Rouge, La Compagnie du Hanneton – Sadler's Wells
Outstanding Achievement in Opera	Best New Opera Production
Richard Jones for directing Rodelinda / The Girl of the Golden West / The Mastersingers of Nuremberg, English National Opera – London Coliseum; The ensemble in Moses und Aron, Welsh National Opera – Royal Opera House; Jonas Kaufmann in Andrea Chénier / Manon Lescaut, The Royal Opera – Royal Opera House; L'Orfeo / L'Ormindo, Roundhouse / Sam Wanamaker Playhouse offsite programming – Early Opera Company / Royal Opera House	The Mastersingers of Nuremberg, English National Opera – London Coliseum; Benvenuto Cellini, English National Opera – London Coliseum; Dialogues des Carmélites, The Royal Opera – Royal Opera House; Die Frau ohne Schatten, The Royal Opera – Royal Opera House
Outstanding Achievement in Affiliate Theatre
Bull – Young Vic, Maria; Four Minutes Twelve Seconds – Hampstead Downstairs; Tanya Moodie in Intimate Apparel – Park / The Home That Will Not Stand – Tricycle; Juma Sharkah in Liberian Girl – Jerwood Upstairs, Royal Court
Audience Award
Wicked – Apollo Victoria; Billy Elliot – Victoria Palace; Jersey Boys – Piccadilly; Matilda – Cambridge
Society Special Award
Sylvie Guillem; Kevin Spacey

== Productions with multiple nominations and awards ==
The following 18 productions, including one opera, received multiple nominations:

- 9: Memphis
- 8: Beautiful
- 7: A View from the Bridge
- 6: King Charles III
- 5: City of Angels, Sunny Afternoon, Wolf Hall and Bring up the Bodies
- 4: The Nether
- 3: Here Lies Love, Taken at Midnight
- 2: A Streetcar Named Desire, Cats, Dirty Rotten Scoundrels, Made in Dagenham, Miss Saigon, The Crucible, The Mastersingers of Nuremberg, Women on the Verge of a Nervous Breakdown

The following seven productions, including one opera, received multiple awards:

- 4: Sunny Afternoon
- 3: A View from the Bridge
- 2: Beautiful, City of Angels, Memphis, The Mastersingers of Nuremberg, Wolf Hall and Bring up the Bodies

== See also ==
- 69th Tony Awards
