= The Seasons' Canon =

Ballet by Crystal Pite

- Choreographer: Crystal Pite
- Music: Max Richter; Antonio Vivaldi
- Premiere: 24 September 2016; Palais Garnier
- Original ballet company: Paris Opera Ballet
- Design: Nancy Bryant; Jay Gower Taylor; Tom Visser
- Genre: contemporary ballet

The Seasons' Canon is a contemporary ballet choreographed by Crystal Pite to Max Richter's recomposition of Vivaldi's The Four Seasons. The ballet is Pite's first work made for the Paris Opera Ballet, and premiered in 24 September 2016 at the Palais Garnier. Pite won the Prix Benois de la Danse for Best Choreographer.

== Production ==
Canadian choreographer Crystal Pite was invited by artistic director Benjamin Millepied to create the ballet for the company's opening gala for the season, though he resigned months before the premiere and was succeeded by Aurélie Dupont. At the time, Pite was already an established choreographer, though she was largely unknown in France.

The Seasons' Canon is set to Max Richter's recomposition of Vivaldi's The Four Seasons. The choreography is inspired by the movements of tectonic plates. The ballet is performed by 54 dancers. The original cast includes étoiles Marie-Agnès Gillot, Ludmila Pagliero and Alice Renavand, as well as several premier danseurs. Despite casting some dancers from the higher ranks, she noted, "They have featured roles, but it was important to me that they were women into [sic] the community as well."

Pite was only given four weeks to work on the choreography, which she described as "a sprint." Pite regards herself as a contemporary dance choreographer, and found it difficult to fit into ballet when she was a dancer. However, she enjoyed working with classical ballet dancers because "the kind of architecture they have in their bodies is so ecstatic and beautiful." She added, "The dancers at [Paris Opera Ballet] are amazing, but they have a very different skill set and vocabulary. It stretches me to find a way to deliver their excellence while still staying true to the values that I hold as a choreographer." She described the dancers as "open, willing, generous, patient and delightfully hungry."

The costumes were designed by Nancy Bryant, with khaki green trousers, the men bare-chested and the women in sheer tops. The dancers' throats are painted blue-green. The set and lighting were designed by Jay Gower Taylor and Tom Visser respectively.

== Performances ==
The Seasons' Canon premiered in 24 September 2016 at the Palais Garnier. Pacific Northwest Ballet debuted the ballet in November 2022. Boston Ballet debuted the ballet in October 2024.

== Critical reception ==
Laura Capelle of The Financial Times gave The Seasons' Canon five stars. She commented, "The sculptural tableaux and mass effects are far from today's pas de deux-centric work and practically a throwback to Maurice Béjart. Their musicality and grounded articulation demonstrate Pite's craft; Jiří Kylián was an early influence, and this is still felt in a series of short duets. The [Paris Opera Ballet] responded to the work with wholehearted commitment, and one hopes Pite will be back to build on this first collaboration." Roslyn Sulcas of New York Times, wrote that "Pite has created massed blocks of movement that focus on large-scale patterning to often thrilling effect," but "the piece feels all about effect."

For her work on The Seasons' Canon, Pite won the Prix Benois de la Danse for Best Choreographer.
