= Crystal Pite =

Canadian choreographer and dancer (born 1970)

Crystal Pite CM
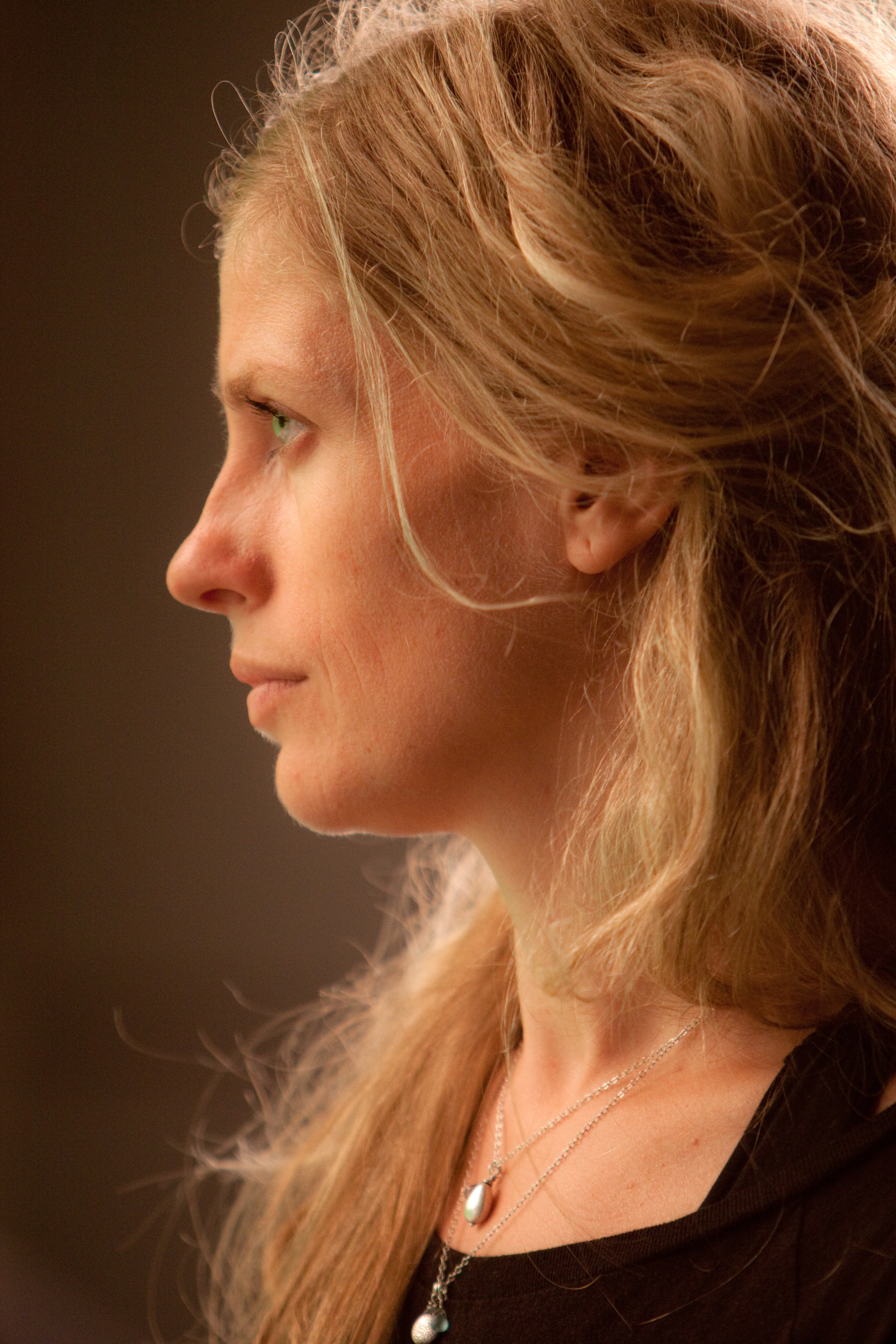
- Pite in 2010
- Born: December 15, 1970 (age 55); Terrace, British Columbia, Canada
- Occupations: Dancer; choreographer
- Career
- Current group: Kidd Pivot
- Former groups: Ballet British Columbia, Ballett Frankfurt
- Dances: Contemporary dance
- Website: kiddpivot.org

Crystal Pite CM (born December 15, 1970) is a Canadian choreographer and dancer. She began her professional dance career in 1988 at Ballet BC, and in 1996 she joined Ballett Frankfurt under the tutelage of William Forsythe. After leaving Ballett Frankfurt she became the resident choreographer of Montreal company Les Ballets Jazz de Montreal from 2001 to 2004. She then returned to Vancouver where she focused on choreographing while continuing to dance in her own pieces until 2010. In 2002 she formed her own company called Kidd Pivot, which produced her original works Uncollected Work (2003), Double Story (2004), Lost Action (2006), Dark Matters (2009), The You Show (2010), The Tempest Replica (2011), Betroffenheit (2015), and Revisor (2019) to date. Throughout her career she has been commissioned by many international dance companies to create new pieces, including The Second Person (2007) for Netherlands Dans Theater and Emergence (2009) for the National Ballet of Canada, the latter of which was awarded four Dora Mavor Moore Awards.

In 2010, Kidd Pivot became the resident dance company of the German theatre Künstlerhaus Mousonturm, and for the next three years Pite premiered her work in Frankfurt, Germany. While working in Frankfurt, Pite choreographed The You Show (2010), which explored different types of relationships in various duets and The Tempest Replica (2011) which was based on Shakespeare's The Tempest. When her arrangement with Künstlerhaus Mousonturm expired she became an Associate Artist with Sadler's Wells' in 2013 and created Polaris (2015) based on Thomas Adès's music, using both the dancers from Kidd Pivot and 60 students from New York University. Her work Betroffenheit (2015), a piece co-created with collaborator Jonathon Young, premiered at the 2015 Pan American Games. Her most recent work for Kidd Pivot Revisor (2019), was also created with Jonathon Young, premiering in Vancouver with DanceHouse at The Vancouver Playhouse.

Throughout her career as a choreographer, Pite has choreographed works for world renowned companies such as Nederlands Dans Theatre I, The Paris Opera Ballet, Ballet Jörgen, Ballet BC, Les Ballets Jazz de Montreal, Cullberg Ballet, the National Ballet of Canada, The Royal Ballet, Ballett Frankfurt, and Cedar Lake Contemporary Ballet. She has choreographed over 50 works, many of which have been nominated for and won several awards. Currently, while running Kidd Pivot, she is also an Associate Artist at Sadler's Wells in London, an Associate Choreographer with Nederlands Dans Theatre in The Netherlands, and an Associate Dance Artist of Canada's National Arts Centre.

== Early life and career ==
Crystal Pite was born in Terrace, British Columbia on December 15, 1970. She has two younger brothers. Pite stated that she began choreographing when she was a toddler, creating choreography to a song called "My Little Red Wagon" at age 3. She grew up in Victoria, British Columbia, and started studying tap at age 4, then ballet the following year. She then studied dance under Maureen Eastick and Wendy Green. During this time Pite choreographed on her classmates on Saturday afternoons, and choreographed the musical at her high school. She also studied at the Banff Centre in summer programs and The School of Toronto Dance Theatre.

She joined Ballet BC as a dancer in 1988 and performed with the company for eight years. In 1990 she created her first professional choreography with the company called Between the Bliss and Me. The success of this work allowed her to create additional pieces with Ballet BC, as well as choreography with Les Ballets Jazz De Montreal and Canada's Ballet Jörgen. In 1990, Pite danced in her first William Forsythe ballet, In the Middle, Somewhat Elevated which was her initial introduction to performing his work.

== Ballett Frankfurt and William Forsythe ==
Pite was attracted to Forsythe's choreography and wild interpretation of ballet. In 1995, she auditioned for his dance company Ballett Frankfurt. She was hired as a dancer, and in 1996, Pite left Canada for Germany to officially join the company. Pite performed around the world with Ballett Frankfurt in EIDOS : TELOS, The Loss of Small Detail, and Endless House. Pite was also excited to develop choreography with Forsythe using his improvisational technologies and in 2000 created Excerpts from a Future Work. She was involved in the creation of Forsythe's educational film "William Forsythe: Improvisation Technologies: A Tool for the Analytical Dance Eye" as one of the four featured dancers. She retired from dancing when she was 40 after the birth of her son.

== Return to British Columbia and Kidd Pivot ==
Pite returned to British Columbia in 2001 and took up residence in Vancouver. Later that year, she created a duet called Tales - New and Abridged with Cori Caulfield. In 2001, she was appointed to a three-year residency with Les Ballets Jazz de Montréal to choreograph new works. Her first show with the company, Short Works: 22, premiered that same year. She expanded this piece to be featured in the first part of The Stolen Show, also performed by Les Ballet Jazz de Montréal. The second part featured choreography that was also called The Stolen Show and the third piece was called Xspectacle.

Pite formed Kidd Pivot in 2002 as an inter-disciplinary performing arts company based in Vancouver. Her first dance shows with the company showcased her shorter works and sometimes featured other choreographers. Among her first pieces was Double Story, which explored two perspectives of a romantic relationship. Pite and Richard Siegal each choreographed a perspective and danced each section as a duet. Pite's choreography was called Man Asunder and was created two years after Siegal's section. It contained a through line of childhood friends who were having various dreams. At some points in the dance the performers became adults that contemplated the mysteries of the universe. At other moments they stepped out of character into a deconstruction setting by rearranging the sets or drinking water on stage. The set on stage included two large mirrors and the choreography included puppetry and masks.

In Lost Action, another work created for Kidd Pivot, Pite explored the theme of the disappearance of dance. The piece showcased a violent scene that left a man dead and then replayed this several times, each with variations. Lost Action had a simplistic costume design and a few props in order to enhance the performance. Most of the piece's budget was used to bring the cast of four men and three women to Vancouver to create the choreography. The dancing consisted of "fractured movement...exaggerated to make a dance of broken rhythms and twisted limbs." The piece blended classical contemporary and hip hop movements with immense control from the dancers. In 2011, the National Film Board of Canada recorded a section of this piece and released it as Lost Action: Trace. Her next work for Kidd Pivot was called Uncollected Work (2003) which Pite herself labelled "seminal Kidd Pivot".

While creating for Kidd Pivot, Pite was also commissioned to choreograph pieces for other companies in Canada and around the world. In 2006 Pite returned to Ballet BC to create Arietta. The title of the piece shares the same name as the second movement in Beethoven's Piano Sonata No. 32, which is also the music that the choreography is danced to. The dance departed from Pite's usual style of using props and text and focused abstract movement by the eight performers.

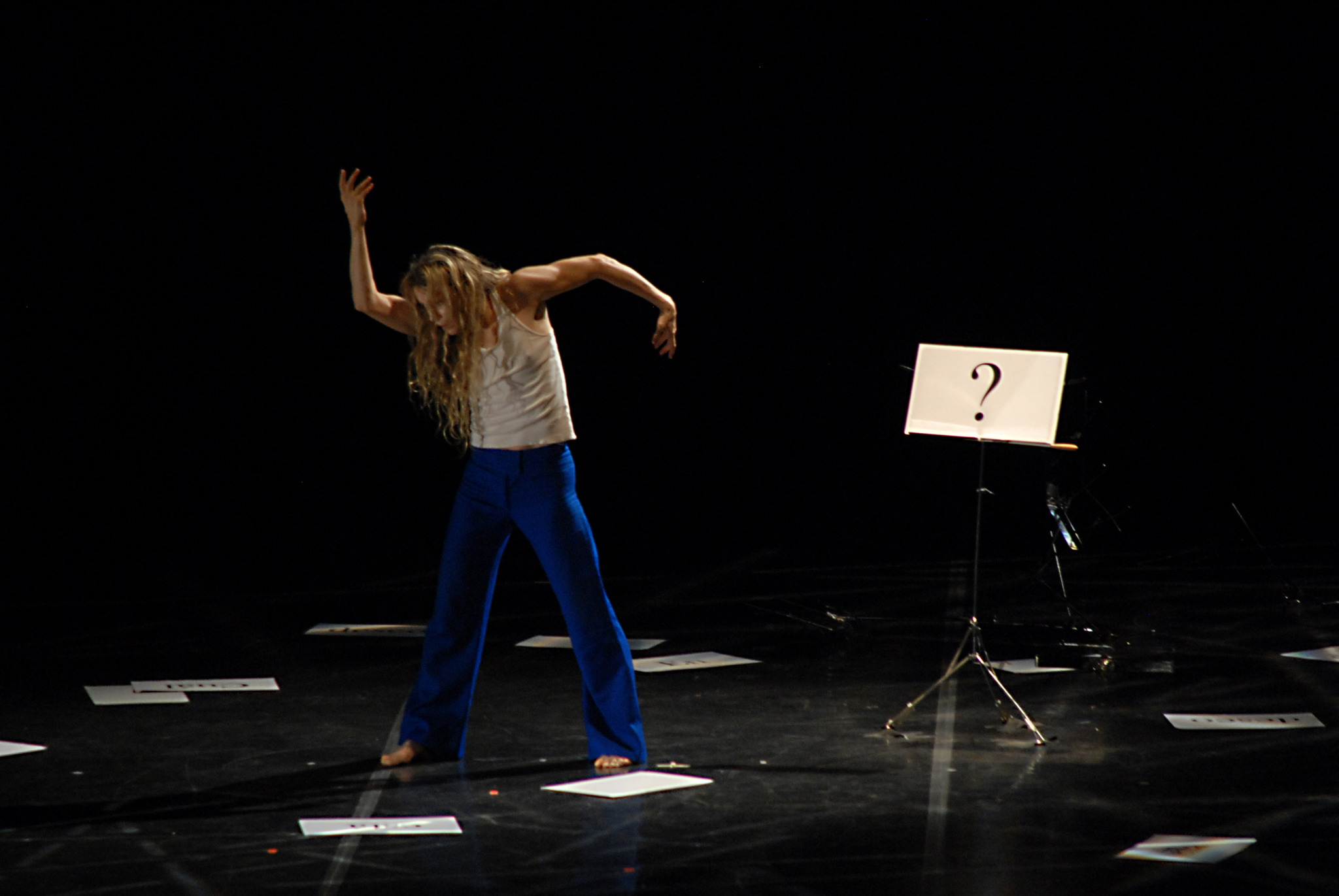
Louise Lecavalier dancing in "Lone Epic" in 2007. The piece premiered the previous year.

Pite choreographed a solo on Louise Lecavalier called Lone Epic in 2006. Lecavalier acted as a conductor of an orchestra while the stage was littered with music stands. As she danced she turned the music stands to reveal messages, including "What is she really thinking?" and "What do you really want, really, really, really?" Lecavalier then knocked over music stands with her dramatic movement. As the choreographer, Pite was commended for developing a dramatic story that depicts the physical breakdown of a conductor.

== Larger-scale works and international commissions ==
In 2007 Pite created The Second Person for Netherlands Dans Theater I. Pite was inspired by Irish, Scottish and English folk songs. Her longtime composer Owen Belton used her inspiration to create unique music that complemented the storm cloud covered stage. The piece included 25 dancers who represent youth and the loss of innocence that comes with growing up. The dancers operated stick puppets while another puppet spoke into a microphone and a large wooden marionette performed as a member of the dance ensemble. The piece utilized many of Pite's signature thematic elements like text and clear narrative The piece was included in NDT's 2009 tour of the United States. In 2008 Pite became an associate choreographer with NDT and has created nine works for the first company since her first, Pilot X, in 2005.

In 2009 Pite created her first two-hour long work with Kidd Pivot, Dark Matters. The piece explored the capabilities of unseen external forces on the body and mind. In the first act a man creates a marionette that is controlled by four dancers dressed as kurokos, traditional Japanese stagehands. The puppet eventually turns on its creator and destroys him with scissors. After intermission all the kurokos except one remove their black clothing and turn into humans, still moving like puppets. Towards the end of the piece, the last shadow reveals that she is also human but moves like a newly created puppet. The piece finishes with the creator from the first act cradling the last kuroko as the kuroko pretends to sew strings onto the creator's body. The choreography was based on ballet vocabulary but was not considered a classical ballet piece. Instead it showed de-centered alignment so that the dancers could create asymmetrical shapes.

Also in 2009 Pite created Emergence for the National Ballet of Canada as part of the program Innovation. This choreography won four Dora Mavor Moore Awards for best choreography, best performance, best score and best production. The piece was inspired by Steven Johnson's work Emergence: The Connected Lives of Ants, Brains, Cities and Software. The dance mimicked the movement of insects, which was a metaphor for human behavior. Some of the themes in the piece included hive mentality, hierarchical mentalities and gender issues. The dancers often performed the same movements but at random intervals throughout the piece. There were also moments of solos and small group pieces that mimicked significant events such as a mating ritual or the coronation of a hive queen.

== Return to Frankfurt ==
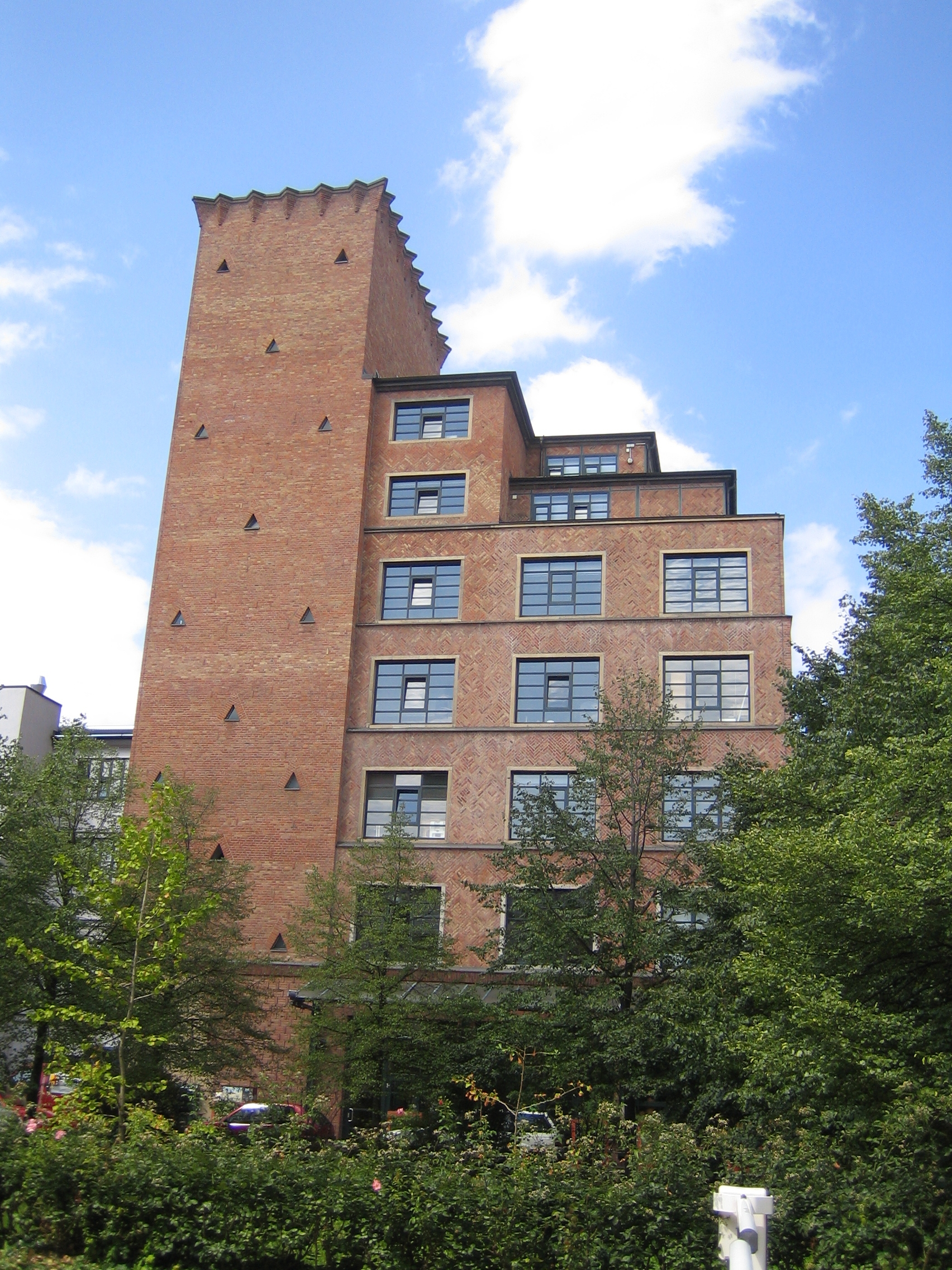
The Künstlerhaus Mousonturm premiered Pite's original choreography from 2010 to 2012.

In 2010, Kidd Pivot signed a two-year deal (which was later extended to three years) to become the resident dance company of Künstlerhaus Mousonturm in Frankfurt. As part of the deal, the company changed their name to Kidd Pivot Frankfort RM and premiered new choreography by Pite at the theatre house. This resulted in Pite splitting her time between Frankfurt and her hometown of Vancouver. Kidd Pivot also increased their touring schedule during this time as the company was invited to perform in various countries. Also in 2010, Pite chose to stop performing in her own work. Pite worried that this decision might take the joy out of choreographing but later said; "I have more knowledge and understanding of certain things, but less ability in my body... So it's an interesting pull in two directions there. What I do have are incredible people around me. I have incredible dancers — I dance through them."

Among her first choreography with the renamed company was The You Show, which explored different conflicts that couples may have with each other. The show was divided into four duets. The first piece A Picture of You Falling was the only section that was remounted from a previous work. It explored the relationship between two people trying to connect and consistently missing each other. Throughout the piece a voice-over hinted at previous events between the two dancers. The second dance, The Other You, featured two visually similar performers dressed in matching suits that dancing as if they were physically connected. The third section was called Das Glashaus and featured an original score that sounded like broken glass. A Picture of You Flying was the final section where Pite used humour to complement the more serious nature of the previous works. It was a piece about a superhero who struggled in a relationship with his girlfriend. Ensemble members of Kidd Pivot performed in this piece as various superheroes or villains.

In 2011, Pite premiered Tempest Replica. At first she explored film noir movies but felt these stories did not have enough humanity or spirituality. When she read The Tempest she was inspired to recreate the shipwreck at the beginning of the play. In the first half of the show Prospero was the only dancer dressed in street clothes while the other dancers dressed in grey clothing and face masks. Prospero manipulated the other dancers as if they were robots. In the second half all of the dancers are dressed in street clothes and Prospero danced a duet or trio with each character, showcasing his relationship with them. Throughout the piece Pite projected the act and scene number from the original play with a short scene description to help the audience understand the plot. At dramatic moments she also projected the corresponding line from The Tempest. Pite used puppets and shadows to help explain the plot, creating a play-within-a-play feeling.

== Later works ==
In 2013, Sadler's Wells appointed Pite as an associate artist following her residency with Künstlerhaus Mousonturm. The following year The Tempest Replica was performed at Sadler's Wells as its United Kingdom premiere. Pite took this opportunity to rework and improve upon the piece, stating "it wasn't done. It wasn't awful, but it wasn't what it was going to be. I knew that I would need more time and money to fix it." The Tempest Replica was originally performed in Frankfurt in 2011 as part of Pite's partnership with Künstlerhaus Mousonturm. This newer version of Tempest Replica won Pite the Olivier Award for Outstanding Achievement in Dance in 2015.

Polaris was Pite's first original work for Sadler's Wells. Premiering in 2014, it was part of a larger program called Thomas Adès: See the Music, Hear the Dance to honor the music of Thomas Adès. It was danced to Adès' song Polaris which was played by 75 musicians placed throughout the theatre and featured 64 dancers from Kidd Pivot and London Contemporary Dance School. For some of the piece all the dancers moved as one entity in synchronization. Pite also incorporated smaller group sections that were slower and used more control in the movement. Pite won the Olivier Award for Outstanding Achievement in Dance for her work on this piece as well as The Tempest Replica, and A Picture of You Falling in 2015.

Pite premiered a new piece at Panamania during the 2015 Pan American Games in Toronto. Betroffenheit is a collaboration between Pite and Jonathon Young, co-artistic director of Vancouver-based theatre group Electric Company Theatre, with dancers from Kidd Pivot. The title refers to the indescribable shock after a traumatic event. Betroffenheit received several awards; Laurence Olivier Award for Best New Dance Production in 2017, The Georgia Straight's Critic's Choice Innovation Award presented at The Jessie Richardson Theatre Awards in 2016, Dora Mavor Moore Award for Outstanding Production in 2016, and The Critic's Circle National Dance Award for Outstanding Performance in Modern Dance to Jonathon Young for his performance in Betroffenheit in 2016.

In 2017, the Royal Opera House commissioned a new piece from Pite called Flight Pattern which premiered in March of that year. Pite set the piece to the Polish composer Henryk Gorecki's 1976 Symphony of Sorrowful Songs. It was conducted by Koen Kessels, the soprano was Jennifer Davis, and the dancers were members of the Royal Ballet. Critic Luke Jennings described it as "a sombre and deeply affecting work" that "cuts to the heart". Pite received an Olivier Award in 2018 for "Best New Dance Production" for Flight Pattern.

Pite created a new piece in 2019 called Revisor, collaborating with Jonathon Young and her company Kidd Pivot for the second time. Revisor premiered in 2019 at The Vancouver Playhouse in Vancouver, British Columbia. Revisor is a piece for eight dancers and uses recorded dialogue from several Canadian actors to aid in portraying the narrative. Revisor is inspired by and loosely based on Nikolai Gogol's 1836 play The Government Inspector.

In 2022, Pite was the subject of a feature-length documentary, Crystal Pite: Angels' Atlas, directed by Chelsea McMullan.

In 2026, Pite delivered a massage on International Dance Day.

== Choreographic works ==
- 1989 Between The Bliss and Me - Ballet BC
- 1992 Reflection on Billy - Ballet Jörgen
- 1993 In a Time of Darkness - Alberta Ballet
- 1994 Shapes of a Passing - Ballet Jörgen
- 1995 Two Dances for Jane - Ballet Jörgen
- 1995 Pendulum - Les Ballets Jazz de Montreal
- 1995 Quest - Alberta Ballet
- 1996 Moving Day - Ballet BC
- 1996 Field:Fiction - Ballett Frankfurt
- 1998 Hopping The Twig - Ballet Jörgen
- 2001 Tales - New and Abridged - Produced by Ballett Frankfurt
- 2001 Short Works: 22 - Les Ballets Jazz de Montreal
- 2003 Uncollected Work - Kidd Pivot
- 2004 Double Story - Kidd Pivot
- 2004 The Stolen Show - Les Ballets Jazz de Montreal
- 2004 Xspectacle - Les Ballets Jazz de Montreal
- 2005 Pilot X - Nederlands Dans Theater I
- 2006 Arietta - Ballet BC
- 2006 Lost Action - Kidd Pivot
- 2006 Lone Epic - Solo for Louise Lecavalier
- 2007 The Second Person - Nederlands Dans Theater I
- 2008 Frontier - Nederlands Dans Theater I
- 2008 10 Duets on a Theme of Rescue - Cedar Lake Contemporary Ballet
- 2008 Matter of a Maker - Cullberg Ballet
- 2009 Emergence - The National Ballet of Canada
- 2009 Dark Matters - Kidd Pivot
- 2010 The You Show - Kidd Pivot
- 2010 Plot Point - Nederlands Dans Theater I
- 2011 The Tempest Replica - Kidd Pivot
- 2012 Solo Echo - Nederlands Dans Theater I
- 2013 Parade - Nederlands Dans Theater I
- 2015 Betroffenheit - Kidd Pivot
- 2015 In The Event - Nederlands Dans Theater I
- 2016 The Statement - Nederlands Dans Theater I
- 2016 The Seasons' Canon - Paris Opera Ballet (based on Antonio Vivaldi's The Four Seasons)
- 2017 Flight Pattern - The Royal Ballet
- 2018 Partita for 8 Dancers - Nederlands Dans Theater I
- 2019 Revisor - Kidd Pivot
- 2019 Body And Soul - Paris Opera Ballet
- 2020 Angels' Atlas - The National Ballet of Canada
- 2022 Light of Passage - The Royal Ballet

== Personal life ==
Pite's partner is Jay Gower Taylor, who is also Kidd Pivot's set designer. They met while both were dancers with Ballet British Columbia. In 2010 Pite gave birth to her son Niko. She currently resides in Vancouver to live closer to her family.

== Choreographic style ==
Pite choreographs in contemporary and neo-classical dance styles. Her choreography tries to convey emotion to the audience. The topics of her choreography often address the human condition. Pite stated that her choreography is usually her attempt to translate an idea she has into movement.

Pite's choreography will often include the narrative aspect of a theme, explored in the first half of the piece, followed by abstract movement in the second half. Her dancers will often transition between exaggerated shapes.

== Awards ==
- 1995 : Banff Centre's Clifford E. Lee Award
- 2004: Paul D. Fleck Fellowship in the Arts from The Banff Centre
- 2004: Bonnie Bird North American Choreography Award
- 2005: Isadora Award for Choreography
- 2006: Rio Tinto Alcan Performing Arts Award – Dance, administered by the Vancouver East Cultural Centre
- 2006: Jessie Richardson Theatre Award
- 2008: Governor General's Performing Arts Awards Mentorship Award
- 2009: Dora Mavor Moore Award for Outstanding Choreography, Production, Performance, and Score (Emergence)
- 2011: Jacob's Pillow Dance Award
- 2012: Lola Award
- 2012: Dora Mavor Moore Award for Outstanding Production (Dark Matters)
- 2012: Canada Council for the Arts' Jacqueline Lemieux Prize
- 2015: Olivier Award for Outstanding Achievement in Dance (The Associates — A Picture of You Falling, The Tempest Replica and Polaris at Sadler's Wells)
- 2016: Critics' Circle National Dance Award : Best Modern Choreography (Polaris, Sadler's Wells)
- 2016: Georgia Straight Critic's Choice Innovation Award at The Jessie Richardson Theatre Awards (Betroffenheit)
- 2016: Dora Mavor Moore Award for Outstanding Production (Betroffenheit)
- 2017: Prix Benois de la Danse (The Seasons' Canon for Paris Opera Ballet)
- 2017: Olivier Award for Best New Dance Production (Betroffenheit, Sadler's Wells)
- 2018: Dance Magazine Award
- 2018: Grand Prix de la Danse de Montreal Laureate 2018 (Betroffenheit, Festival TransAmériques)
- 2018: Olivier Award for Best New Dance Production (Flight Pattern, The Royal Opera House)
- 2018: Critics' Circle National Dance Award : Best Modern Choreography (The Statement, for Nederlands Dans Theater I)
- 2019: Chrystal Dance Prize (Revisor, Dance Victoria)
