= Richard Siegal =

American dancer and choreographer

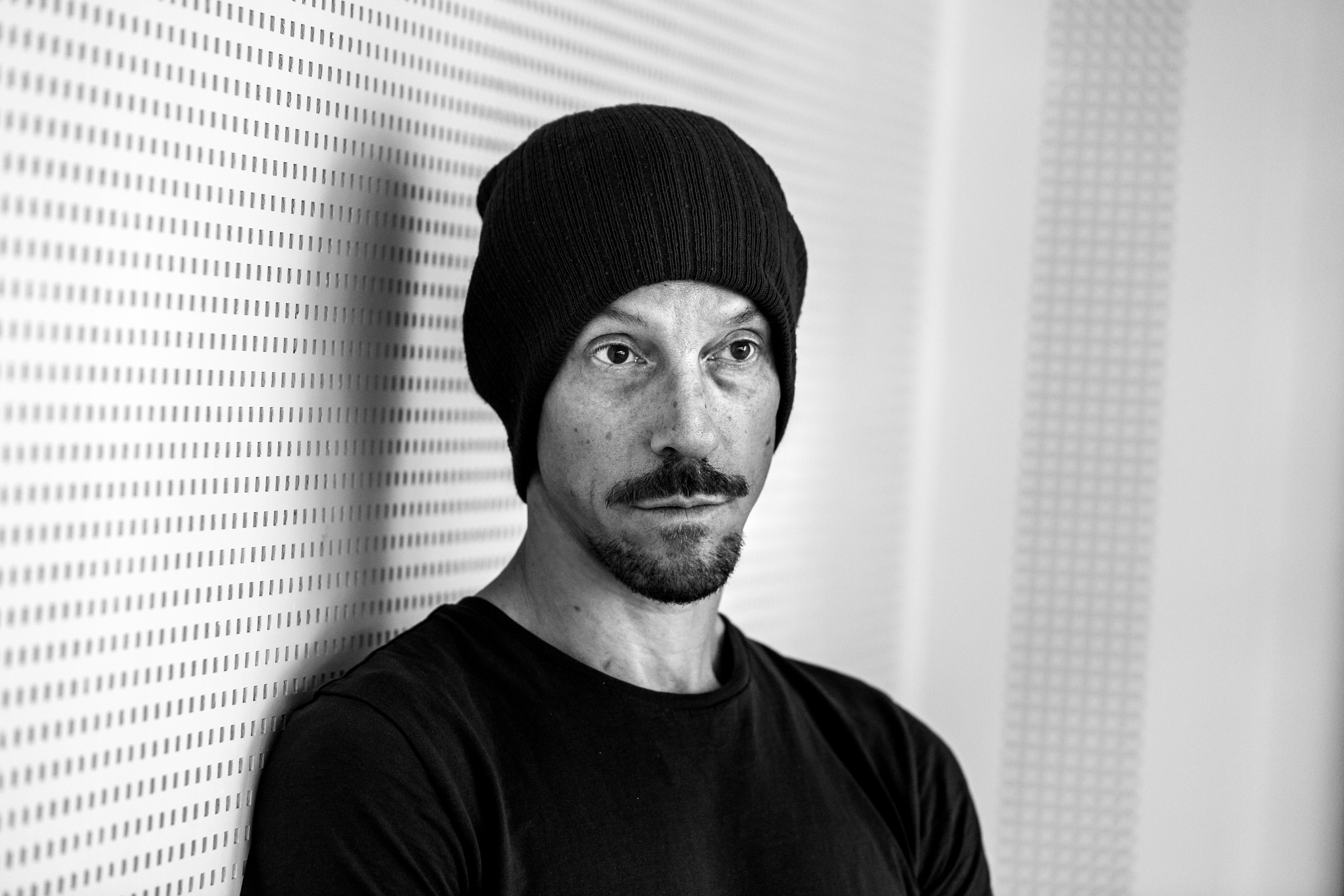
Portrait by Yan Revazov

Richard Siegal is an American dancer and choreographer. He is founder and artistic director of Richard Siegal/Ballet of Difference (2016), a contemporary ballet company based in Germany. He is also founder of The Bakery (2006), an interdisciplinary platform for performance art. As of September 2025, Siegal will serve as artistic director and head choreographer of Staatstheater Nürnberg Ballett.

== Commissions ==
Siegal has been commissioned by institutions including Bayerisches Staatsballett, Berlin Staatsballett, Ballet National de Marseille, Ruhrtriennale, GöteborgOperans Danskompani, Cedar Lake Contemporary Ballet, Sao Paulo Dance Company, Bodytraffic, Festival d'Automne, Munich DANCE Biennial, The Forsythe Company, Ircam, Centre Pompidou, Tanz im August, Ballett Frankfurt, Théâtre National de Chaillot, Tanztheater Wuppertal, Opera Ballet Vlaanderen, Ballett am Rhein, and Kolumba Museum.

== Collaborations ==
He has collaborated with musicians and composers including Lorenzo Bianchi Hoesch, Alva Noto, Alberto Posadas, L’Ensemble Intercontemporain, Diane Labrosse, Arto Lindsay, and Hubert Machnik, Markus Popp, Njamy Sitson, Musik Fabrik, and Igor Levit.

Collaborations with visual artists, architects and industrial designers include Anish Kapoor, Konstantin Grcic, François Roche, and Didier Faustino.

Collaboration with costume and fashion designers include Alexandra Bertaut, Flora Miranda, Bernhard Wilhelm, Becca McCharen/Chromat, and Marta Jakubowski, together with stylist Edda Gudmundsdottir.

== Awards, residencies and curator work ==
Siegal has been awarded with the New York Dance and Performance Bessie Award, The German National Theater Faust Award, S.A.C.D. Prize, a Beaumarchais, The Mouson Award, and Optionsförderung für Tanz in München.

He has also been a resident artist of the ZKM/Karlsruhe, Bennington College, the Baryshnikov Arts Center, and Festspielhaus Sankt Polten.

Additionally, Siegal has worked as a faculty member of the American Dance Festival where he curated the annual Forsythe Festival. He held workshops and performed a Forecast mentorship in Berlin. He served as guest professor at Folkwang University from January to April 2025.

Siegal is a MacDowell Colony Fellow and honorary member of the Bolshoi Ballet's Benois de la Danse.

In 2016, Siegal founded the touring company Ballet of Difference together with ecotopia dance productions, missioned with creating new pertinence to ballet in the 21st century. The company was based in Cologne, Germany at Schauspiel Köln from 2019-2024. As of September 2025, Siegal will become the ballet director of Staatstheater Nürnberg Ballett.

== Ballet of Difference ==
Siegal founded the Ballet of Difference in 2016 with dramaturge Tobias Staab and touring manager Claudia Bauer of Ecotopia Productions. The company interrogates ballet and the position it holds as a cultural artifact in the 21st century and demonstrates its continued relevance as a contemporary art form. The company takes the question of difference as a departure point and explores this in collaboration with a diverse group of artists from different cultural and aesthetic backgrounds.

After an evening dedicated to Siegal’s work commissioned by Bayerisches Staatsballett in 2015, entitled Portrait, which featured both members of the Bayerisches Staatsballett ensemble and guest dancers with whom Siegal previously collaborated, it became clear to Siegal that there was an attitude and aesthetic common to his existing repertoire which needed to be unpacked and further developed in a context of its own.

The first evening produced by Ballet of Difference, entitled NOISE SIGNAL SILENCE, premiered at Muffathalle in Munich in 2016. The evening was interdisciplinary, featuring dance performances and electronic music from Raster Norton—a label headed by Carsten Nicolai, who would become one of Siegal’s foremost collaborators. In Spring 2017, the company premiered in DANCE München, after being granted funding from Landeshauptstadt München and Muffathalle München. The premiere was an evening entitled My Generation, featuring three of Siegal’s ballets, including the world premieres of BoD and Excerpts of a Future Work on the Subject of Chelsea Manning, and a re-staging of My Generation (re-named Pop HD), which would be subsequently toured throughout Europe. The company was initially composed of dancers with whom Siegal had previously worked in companies such as Cedar Lake Contemporary Ballet, Bayerisches Staatsballett, and CCN Ballet National de Marseille.

In 2018, Ballet of Difference collaborated with Schauspiel Köln and Tanz Köln, beginning a relationship which would soon become integral to the company’s development and institutionalization. Ballet of Difference premiered an evening entitled On Body at the Schauspiel Köln, which featured BoD, the premiere of Made For Walking, and a re-staging of Siegel’s seminal work, Unitxt. In 2019, a documentary entitled Draw A Line, based on this program, from director Benedict Mirow premiered. The film chronicled the development of Ballet of Difference both in terms of creations and performances, as well as the conceptual elements underpinning Siegal’s vision.

In December 2018, Siegal’s first full-length production made at the Schauspiel Köln, entitled Roughhouse, had its world premiere, with additional funding from Kulturstiftung Nordrhein-Westfalen. After receiving funding from dem Ministerium für Kultur und Wissenschaft des Landes Nordrhein-Westfalen (Neue Wege) in 2019, the company was officially incorporated into Schauspiel Köln—a collaboration which solidified the company’s presence in Cologne and advanced its development as an institution, and which would come to enable innovative interdisciplinary collaborations between the ballet and the Schauspiel, as was already presented in Siegal’s Roughhouse. The first work inaugurating this new structural arrangement, New Ocean [the natch’l blues], premiered in October 2019 and was subsequently nominated for a Faust for Best Ensemble. New Ocean featured lighting by Matthias Singer, music by Alva Noto (Carsten Nicolai), and costuming by Flora Miranda—a combination typical of most of Siegal’s works which make use of novel contributions from fashion, sound, and technology as means of advancing the artistic ideas underscoring his creations.

The COVID-19 pandemic presented a novel opportunity for Siegal to continue making interactive work using innovative technology and digital space—an area the potential of which Siegal had already begun to mine prior to the pandemic in his interdisciplinary collective, The Bakery. After revising New Ocean for a series of durational six-hour performances adapted to the conditions of the pandemic in October 2020, All for One and One for the Money—a multimedia work for which a unique interactive digital platform was developed—premiered online. The work featured both the Ballet of Difference ensemble and actors of Schauspiel Köln, and featured dance, text, gaming, and a live chat.

In May 2021, the company collaborated with director Benedict Mirow and the Pinakothek der Moderne Museum in Munich to produce a film version of New Ocean. The film was made in the Pinakothek der Moderne under an installation of Anish Kapoor’s entitled Howl. The film premiered on ARTE the same month. Additionally, in June 2021, the company premiered a weekend of dancer-created works in the Kolumba Museum in Köln, entitled Body Tale. Siegal follows a tradition introduced by choreographers including, but not limited to, John Cranko, William Forsythe, and Marcia Haydee, which works to foster the development of new choreographic voices and promote artistic agency among the dancers of the company.

The 2022-23 season began with a 24-hour durational performance of New Ocean in the Kolumba Museum Köln and was followed by a re-staging and re-development of an earlier set of works made for Ballet of Difference entitled Made for Walking and Made Two Walking. Made Two Walking/Made All Walking premiered in December 2022 at the Schauspiel Köln to critical acclaim. February 2022 saw the premiere of Triple, an evening consisting of Siegal’s All For One, Metric Dozen, and My Generation. Siegal’s next work entitled Xerrox, Vol. II, will premiere in Köln in May 2022.

== Selected works ==
As If Stranger (2006)

The New 45 (2008)

©oPirates (2010)

Civic Mimic (2011)

Black Swan (2012)

the world to the darkness and to me (2013)

Unitxt (2013)

If/Then for Strings (2014)

Metric Dozen (2014)

In a Landscape (2015)

My Generation (2015)

Model (2015)

Excerpts of a Future Work on the Subjects of Chelsea Manning (2017)

BOD (2017)

Roughhouse (2018)

Oval (2019)

New Ocean [the natch'l blues] (2019)

All for One and One for the Money (2020)

Two for the Show (2021)

Ectopia (2021)

Made Two Walking/Made All Walking (2021)

Xerrox, Vol. II (2022)

Petruschka (2022)

Ballet of (Dis)Obedience (2023)

BoDy (without) Organs (2023)

New Ballet Mécanique (2023)

The People United (2024)

Collective Action (2024)

Lunar Cycle (2025)

== Awards and recognition ==
Benois de la Danse – Honorary Member (2004)

MacDowell Fellowship (2004)

S.A.C.D. Prize (2006)

Mouson Award (2007/2008)

New York Bessie Award – Visual Designer (2008)

Der Faust – Dance Performance (2010)

Münchner Tanzpreis (2013)

Danza & Danza Award – Choreography (2017)

Art Director's Club Grand Prix (Das Totale Tanz Theater) (2019)

Cannes XR Official Selection (Das Totale Tanz Theater) (2019)

Optionsförderung für Tanz München (2010, 2016, 2020)

Forbes Top 35 VR Installation (Das Totale Tanz Theater) (2020)
