= Purple Rain (musical) =

- Music: Prince
- Lyrics: Prince
- Book: Branden Jacobs-Jenkins (Minneapolis); Peter Duchan (Broadway)
- Basis: Film Purple Rain by: Albert Magnoli; William Blinn
- Premiere: October 16, 2025: State Theatre, Minneapolis
- Productions: 2025 Minneapolis; 2027 Broadway

Purple Rain is a stage musical based on the 1984 film Purple Rain, featuring music and lyrics by Prince. The musical is adapted from the original screenplay by Albert Magnoli and William Blinn. The Minneapolis production featured a book by Branden Jacobs-Jenkins and was directed by Lileana Blain-Cruz, while the Broadway production will feature a new book by Peter Duchan and be directed by Saheem Ali. Ebony Williams choreographed the Minneapolis production and will continue with the Broadway production. The musical features music supervision, arrangements, and orchestrations by Jason Michael Webb.

The musical had its world-premiere pre-Broadway engagement at the State Theatre in Minneapolis, Minnesota, beginning previews on October 16, 2025, and officially opening on November 5, 2025. The production played its final performance on November 23, 2025. A Broadway production at the Majestic Theatre will begin previews on March 12, 2027, before officially opening on April 12, 2027.

== Background ==
Purple Rain is based on the 1984 film and its accompanying soundtrack album, both closely associated with the late musician Prince. The original film tells the semi-autobiographical story of an aspiring Minneapolis musician known as The Kid.

The stage adaptation was announced as a Broadway-aimed production, with its world premiere set in Minneapolis, Prince's hometown. The musical updates the narrative of The Kid, a young frontman in the Minneapolis club scene dealing with family conflict, rivalry with other bands, and a romance with an aspiring singer named Apollonia, all while trying to establish himself as an artist.

== Production history ==
The musical premiered at the State Theatre in Minneapolis as a pre-Broadway engagement. The production began previews on October 16, 2025, officially opened on November 5, 2025, and closed on November 23, 2025.

The production was directed by Tony Award nominee Lileana Blain-Cruz and choreographed by Emmy Award winner Ebony Williams. Taylor Williams, CSA served as casting director, Amanda Spooner served as production stage manager, and Orin Wolf produced the musical.

A Broadway production will begin previews at the Majestic Theatre on March 12, 2027, officially opening on April 12, 2027. It will be directed by Saheem Ali and feature a new book by Peter Duchan. Ebony Williams and Jason Michael Webb will continue with the production as choreographer and music supervisor, respectively.

== Cast ==
The Minneapolis production featured the following principal cast, including Kris Kollins making his professional stage debut as The Kid, alongside Rachel Webb as Apollonia.

Character	Minneapolis
Character	2025
The Kid	Kris Kollins
Apollonia	Rachel Webb
Doc	Bilaal Avaz
Father	Leon Addison Brown
Susan	Jaci Calderon
Billy Sparks	Lawrence Gilliard, Jr.
Jill	Anissa Griego
Morris	Jared Howelton
Brenda	Christina Jones
Lisa	Emma Lenderman
Bobby	Gían Pérez
Mark	Kondwani Phiri
Jerome	Antonio Michael Woodard
Wendy	Grace Yoo

The Kid was also played by alternate Jason Korn. The ensemble comprised Christian Burse, Jojo Carmichael, Adante Carter, Dion Simmons Grier, Chase Maxwell, Christine Shepard, Jake Tribus, Sabrina Victor, Charles P. Way, and Peli Naomi Woods. Swings were Solymar Baxter and Trajan Clayton.

== Music ==
The musical heavily utilizes the songs originally written by Prince for the 1984 film and its soundtrack album. The theatrical adaptation features additional songs from Prince.

Jason Michael Webb served as music supervisor, arranger, and orchestrator. Bobby Z. and Morris Hayes served as Prince music advisors.

== Reception ==
Critics generally praised Kollins' physical and vocal embodiment of Prince's energy, as well as Webb's powerful performance as Apollonia, but noted that the book by Jacobs-Jenkins struggled at times to balance a modern theatrical narrative with the legacy of the original film.

== See also ==
- Purple Rain (film)
- Purple Rain (album)
- Purple Rain (song)
