= Ebony Williams =

American dancer and choreographer

Ebony Williams is an American dancer and choreographer. She performed with Cedar Lake Contemporary Ballet and appeared in music videos for Beyoncé, including "Single Ladies (Put a Ring on It)". Her choreography work includes the film Sneakerella, for which she shared a 2022 Children's & Family Emmy Award for Outstanding Choreography with Emilio Dosal.

== Early life and education ==
Williams grew up in Boston and trained through Boston Ballet's Citydance scholarship program before studying at the Boston Ballet School.

She left ballet during her first year of high school and later enrolled at Quincy College to study physical therapy. After six years away from formal ballet training, Williams transferred to the dance program at the Boston Conservatory, graduating in May 2005.

== Career ==
After two auditions, Williams joined Cedar Lake Contemporary Ballet in late 2005. She remained with the company for approximately a decade.

During an off-season, Williams began pursuing commercial dance work and obtained representation through choreographer Laurieann Gibson.

In 2008, Williams appeared in Beyoncé's music video for "Single Ladies (Put a Ring on It)", choreographed by JaQuel Knight. She later appeared in Beyoncé's video for "Countdown" and performed with artists including Jennifer Hudson, Rihanna and Fergie. Williams continued performing with Cedar Lake alongside her commercial work, declining an offer to tour with Beyoncé in order to remain with the company.

Williams and Kany Diabaté created the choreography for Beyoncé's "My Power" sequence in the visual album Black Is King. Writing in the Los Angeles Times, Makeda Easter described the sequence's choreography as expressing "grace, strength and beauty".

Williams later expanded into choreography across music, film and theatre. For the original Broadway production of Jagged Little Pill, she performed in the chorus and as the Barista, and was credited as an assistant choreographer. She later received an associate choreographer credit.

Her screen choreography credits include In the Heights, on which she worked as an associate choreographer, and Sneakerella. For Sneakerella, Williams and fellow choreographer Emilio Dosal won the 2022 Children's & Family Emmy Award for Outstanding Choreography.

In 2024, Williams choreographed the Huntington Theatre Company production of Toni Stone, using movement to stage both baseball action and dance sequences. The following year, she created the movement for Alma's Summertime Musical, a half-hour special of the PBS Kids animated series Alma's Way, with her choreography interpreted by animators.

Williams choreographed the 2025 Minneapolis premiere of Purple Rain, the stage musical based on Prince's 1984 film. She continued as choreographer for its planned Broadway production in 2027.
