= Jacopo Godani =

Italian-born dancer-choreographer

Jacopo Godani is an Italian dancer-choreographer who directs Dresden Frankfurt Dance Company

== Dance career ==
Godani was born in La Spezia, Italy, where he began studying classical ballet and modern dance techniques in 1984 at the Centro studi Danza, under the direction of Loredana Rovagna. He also pursued studies in the visual arts for three years at the Fine Arts School of Carrara. In 1986, Godani was accepted to further his studies at Maurice Béjart's international dance centre, Mudra in Brussels.

Godani made his professional debut in 1988 performing with several Paris based contemporary dance companies. In 1990, Godani formed his own Brussels based company and began his choreographic career. His work in Brussels was produced by the theatre Atelier Saint Anne and was supported by the Plateau theatre. From 1991 to 2000, Godani has been a leading soloist with William Forsythe's Ballet Frankfurt and has collaborated with Forsythe on the choreographic creation of many of Ballet Frankfurt’s most representative pieces.

== Choreographic career ==
Godani developed his career as a choreographer creating original works for international companies such as: Royal Ballet Covent Garden, Bayerisches Staatsballett, Compañía Nacional de Danza, Nederlands Dans Theater, Royal Danish Ballet, Ballet British Columbia, Le Ballet du Capitole de Toulouse, Corpo di ballo del Teatro alla Scala, Royal Ballet of Flanders, Ballet de l'Opéra national du Rhin, Finnish National Ballet, Semperoper Ballett, Sydney Dance Company, Israeli Opera Ballet & Suzanne Dellal Centre, Het Nationale Ballet, Aterballetto, Les Ballets de Monte Carlo and Cedar Lake Contemporary Ballet.

Godani was appointed as Artistic Director and Choreographer of the Dresden Frankfurt Dance Company beginning with the 2015/2016 season. He left the company after the 2022/2023 season, and was succeeded as Artistic Director by Ioannis Mandafounis.

Godani conceives all stages of work from the initial choreography through to designing the spaces, objects, environments and stage setting where his actions take place, writes text and concepts for his dramaturgical work, styles the image of interpreters conceiving costumes, engineers and develops innovative ways of using lighting, video and projections, and creates/edits music for some of his pieces. Godani formed a team of professionals to collaborate on the development of original ideas applied to all fields that require a creative and innovative concept to reflect the progressive perspective of our contemporary world.
