= Ballet Jörgen Canada =

Performing arts company in Canada

Ballet Jörgen Canada was founded in 1987 by Susan Bodie and Bengt Jörgen and is based in Toronto, Ontario. The company tours smaller communities with 21 dancers, and has a community outreach program for students. The ballet's feeder program is at George Brown College. As of 2006, it is Canada's fifth largest ballet company.

In 2019, Ballet Jörgen produced the world premiere of a ballet adaptation of Anne of Green Gables. A documentary, This is Ballet, was created about the production. Around this time, Bengt Jörgen was awarded the Order of Canada.

In November 2025, prior to their Christmas tour, its sets for The Nutcracker were stolen, which attracted offers of assistance from other dance groups. The sets were recovered intact after 16 hours, and the performance went ahead as scheduled.
