= Peeping Tom (theatre company) =

Belgian theatre company

Peeping Tom (Dutch: Glurende Tom; French: Voyeur) is a Belgian theater company founded in 2000 by Argentine choreographer Gabriela Carrizo and French choreographer Franck Chartier. The pair met while working with other Belgian performance companies, including Les Ballets C de la B.

Since its foundation, the company has produced twelve shows and has collaborated with companies across Europe, including the Nederlands Dans Theater (NDT), the Residenz Theatre in Munich, the Gothenburg opera house, and the Opera National de Lyon.

== Overview ==
=== Name ===
The name "Peeping Tom" refers to voyeurism. It originated with their first performance, Caravana, in which the audience looked through the windows of a trailer home.

=== Style ===
Peeping Tom uses cinematographic techniques such as sound, lighting, and camera zoom, inspired by the work of the photographer Gregory Crewdson.

The company often constructs sets before developing characters. Chartier has highlighted the role of sound in conveying characters' psychological states and noted that performances are developed collaboratively in a relaxed, exploratory studio environment.

== Other projects ==
=== Documentary ===
Belgian filmmakers Mieke Struyve and Lotte Stoops created a documentary about the company titled Third Act (2019). The film follows Peeping Tom on its world tour with the trilogy Vader, Moeder, and Kind. The trilogy explores themes of aging and family, reflected both in the performances and the personal experiences of the cast, with theatrical narratives interwoven with personal accounts.

=== Artist-in-residence at the KMSKA in Antwerp ===
The Peeping Tom collective serves as artist-in-residence at the Royal Museum of Fine Arts in Antwerp (KMSKA).
