= The Forsythe Company =

German contemporary dance ensemble

The Dresden Frankfurt Dance Company is a contemporary dance ensemble based in Dresden and Frankfurt, Germany.

It was founded in 2005 as The Forsythe Company by American choreographer William Forsythe following the closure of the Frankfurt Ballet (German: Ballett Frankfurt), established in 1984. The ensemble further pursues the creative work carried out by Forsythe for 20 years with the Frankfurt Ballet, including producing works in the areas of performance, installation, film, and educational media, and drew most of its dancers from the prior company.

The company is supported by a public–private partnership including the German states of Saxony and Hesse, the cities of Dresden and Frankfurt, and private sponsors. It is in residence at both the Festspielhaus Hellerau in Dresden and the Bockenheimer Depot in Frankfurt.

In 2015, the creative directorship was taken over by the Italian dancer and choreographer Jacopo Godani, upon which the company took its present name. Since 2023 the company is directed by the Greek dancer and choreographer Ioannis Mandafounis, a former dancer of the Forsythe Company.

== Literature ==
- Vass-Rhee, Freya (2011). "Dancing Music: The Intermodality of The Forsythe Company". In Spier, Steven (ed.). William Forsythe and the Practice of Choreography: It Starts From Any Point. New York: Routledge. pp. 73–89. ISBN 978-0-415-97822-4.
