= Sidi Larbi Cherkaoui =

Belgian dancer and choreographer

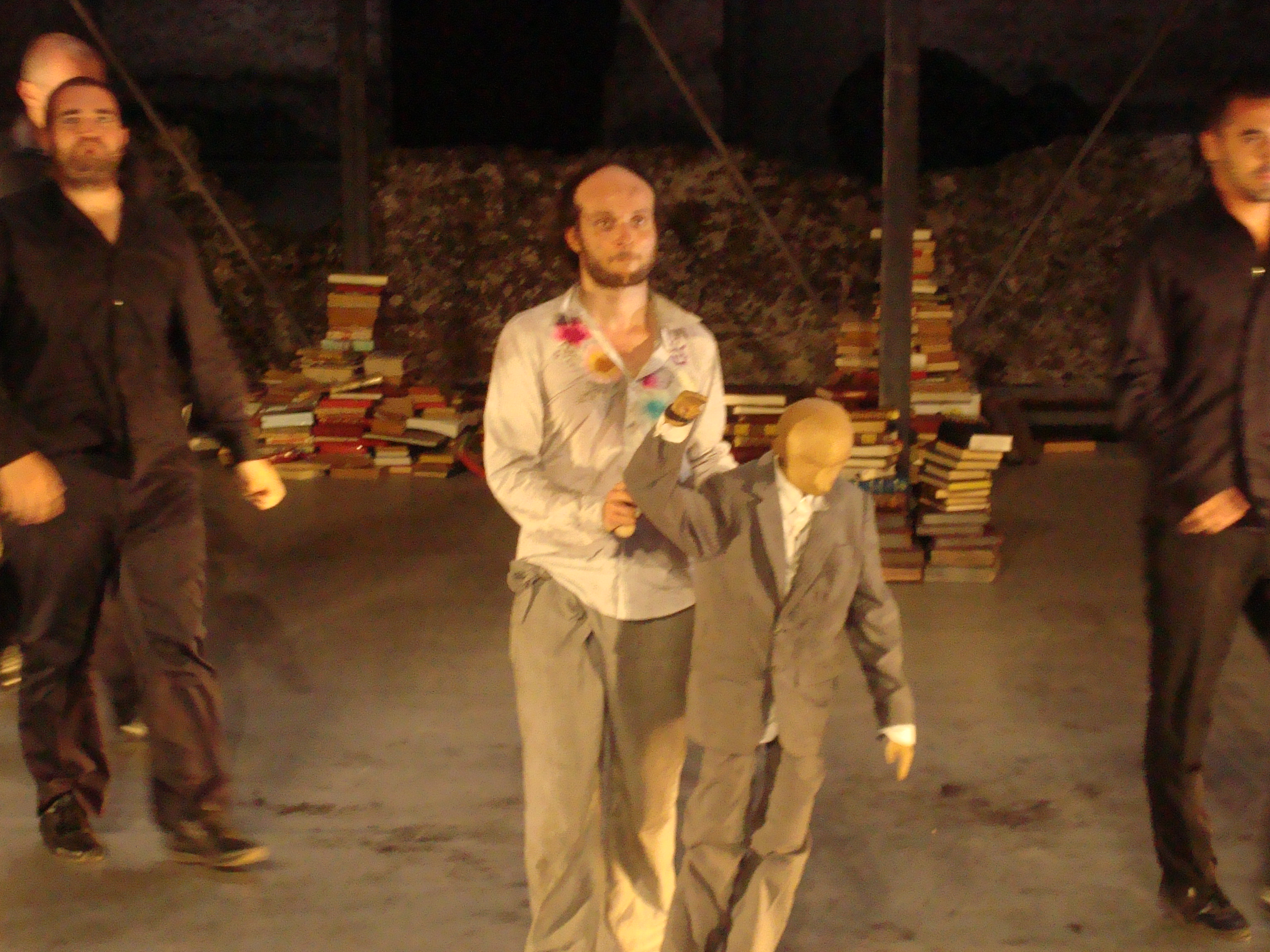
- Cherkaoui in 2009
- Born: 10 March 1976 (age 50); Antwerp, Belgium
- Occupations: Choreographer, dancer, director

Sidi Larbi Cherkaoui (born 10 March 1976) is a Belgian choreographer, dancer, and director. He has made over 50 choreographic pieces and received two Laurence Olivier Award for Best New Dance Production, three Ballet Tanz awards for best choreographer (2008, 2011, 2017), the KAIROS Prize (2009) and the Europe Prize Theatrical Realities (2018).

== Early life ==
He was born on 10 March 1976 in Antwerp, Belgium, to a Flemish mother and a Moroccan father.

After being talent-spotted, he participated as a dancer in variety of shows and television programs. At the age of 19 he won his first prize for his solo performance that included a mixture of vogueing, African dance and hip-hop motifs, at the national dance competition initiated by Alain Platel.

Later on he started studies at P.A.R.T.S., the dance school run by Anne Teresa De Keersmaeker. Here he got to know techniques of such choreographers as William Forsythe, Pina Bausch and Trisha Brown. During these studies, Cherkaoui also worked together with hip-hop and modern jazz dance companies.

== Career ==
Cherkaoui debuted as a choreographer in 1999 with Andrew Wale in the contemporary musical Anonymous Society. But he gained a broader acknowledgment with his work at les ballets C de la B with such pieces as Rien de Rien (2000), Foi (2003) and Tempus Fugit (2004). Whilst working there he undertook several other projects, including D’avant (2002) with artistic partner Damien Jalet and zero degrees (2005) with Akram Khan. He has also collaborated with abundance of theatres, opera houses and ballet companies, like Geneva Ballet, Royal Danish Ballet, Cedar Lake Contemporary Ballet in New York. From 2004 to 2009 Cherkaoui was the associate artist at the Toneelhuis theater in Antwerp. There he produced such works as Myth (2007) and Origine (2008). In 2009, he won the KAIROS Prize.

After premiering Sutra in 2008, working around the world and collaborating with various artists (Dunas with María Pagés, Faun (both 2009)), he founded his own company in January 2010 called Eastman in Antwerp, resident at deSingel International Arts Campus.

In the spring of 2010, Cherkaoui won his first Laurence Olivier Award for Best New Dance Production for Babel(words) together with choreographer Damien Jalet and Antony Gormley. In 2012 he gained his second Laurence Olivier Award for Best New Dance Production for Puz/zle.

In 2015, he directed his first full-length theatre production Pluto in Tokyo and was movement director for Hamlet (Lyndsey Turner) at the Barbican Centre in London. In 2015 he also launched a new production called Fractus V for his company Eastman.

Starting in 2015, Cherkaoui was the artistic director at the Royal Ballet of Flanders, where he produced such works of his as Fall (2015), Exhibition (2016) and Requiem (2017). Cherkaoui was also an associate artist at Sadler's Wells, London. He left the Royal Ballet of Flanders to become the artistic director of Le Grand Théâtre de Genève in Switzerland in 2022.

In February 2017, he appeared in a dancing presentation in Woodkid's release "I Will Fall for You".

== Original works ==
Cherkaoui's work can be divided chronologically in five periods: Debut (1), Les Ballets C. de la B. (2), Toneelhuis (3), Eastman (4) and Royal Ballet Flanders/Eastman (5).

=== Debut ===
- Iets op Bach (1995)
- Anonymous Society (1999)

=== Les ballets C. de la B. ===
- Rien de Rien (2000)
- OOK (2000)
- It (2002)
- d’avant (2002)
- Foi (2003)
- Tempus Fugit (2004)
- In Memoriam (2004)
- Loin (2005)
- zero degrees (2005)
- Corpus Bach (2006)
- Mea Culpa (2006)
- End (2006)

=== Toneelhuis ===
- Myth (2007)
- L'Homme de Bois (2007)
- La Zon-Mai (2007)
- Origine (2008)
- Sutra (2008)
- Orbo Novo (2009)
- Faun (2009) for Sadler's Wells Theatre
- Dunas (2009)

=== Eastman ===
- Babel^{(words)} (2010)
- Rein (2010)
- Play (2010)
- Shoes (2010)
- Bound (2010)
- Das Rheingold (2010)
- Labyrinth (2011)
- TeZukA (2011)
- Pure (2011)
- Constellation (2011)
- Puz/zle (2012)
- Automaton (2012)
- Anna Karenina (2012)
- Siegfried (2012)
- 生长genesis (2013)
- 4D (2013)
- Boléro (2013) for Paris Opera Ballet
- m¡longa (2013) for Sadler's Wells Theatre
- Noetic (2014) for the Göteborg Opera Dance company
- Mercy (2014)
- Shell Shock (2014) for La Monnaie
- Pluto (2015) for Bunkamura
- L'Oiseau de Feu (2015) for Stuttgart Ballet
- Harbor Me (2015) for L.A. Dance Project
- Fractus V (2015)
- Qutb (2016)

=== Royal Ballet Flanders / Eastman ===
- Fall (2015)
- Exhibition (2016)
- Requiem (2017)
- Qutb (2016)
- Les Indes Galantes (2016) for the Bavarian State Opera
- Icon (2016) for The Göteborg Opera Dance company
- Mosaic (2017) for Martha Graham Dance Company
- Requiem (2017) for Royal Ballet of Flanders
- Satyagraha (2017) for Theater Basel
- Memento Mori (2017) for Les Ballets de Monte Carlo
- Mermaid (2017)
- Pelléas et Mélisande (2018) for Opera Vlaanderen
- Medusa (2019) for Royal Ballet

== UnitedHumans Award ==
In 2014 Cherkaoui and Damien Jalet were the first to win the UnitedHumans Award for Mutual Respect. This award is granted to individuals, associations or organizations that applies mutual respect, sincere friendship and equality in dignity to life in a sustainable or a leading and remarkable way or having en effective impact on society.

== Europe Theatre Prize ==
In 2018, Cherkaoui was awarded the XV Europe Prize Theatrical Realities, in Saint Petersburg, with the following motivation:

Creator of a dance theatre with no artistic, geographical or style boundaries, finding in it all kinds of connections, Sidi Larbi Cherkaoui knows how to build performances of ‘soul’, of great formal beauty and a strong emotional impact. His works put into dance terms West and East, the worlds of dance and contemporary art, Chinese martial arts or Japanese manga, strangely incandescent worlds from beyond the grave where one can seek harmony through song, or beautifully disturbing visions of a future genesis, to call up but a few of them. The use of the body, movement, space and objects, his conceptual approach to dance, make every production by Sidi Larbi Cherkaoui a scenic event whose language achieves a particular stylistic form, perfect and truly captivating.

== Sources ==
- Kunstenpunt – Persons – Sidi Larbi Cherkaoui according to the Flemish Arts Institute
