= Contemporary ballet =

Dance genre combining classical ballet and modern dance

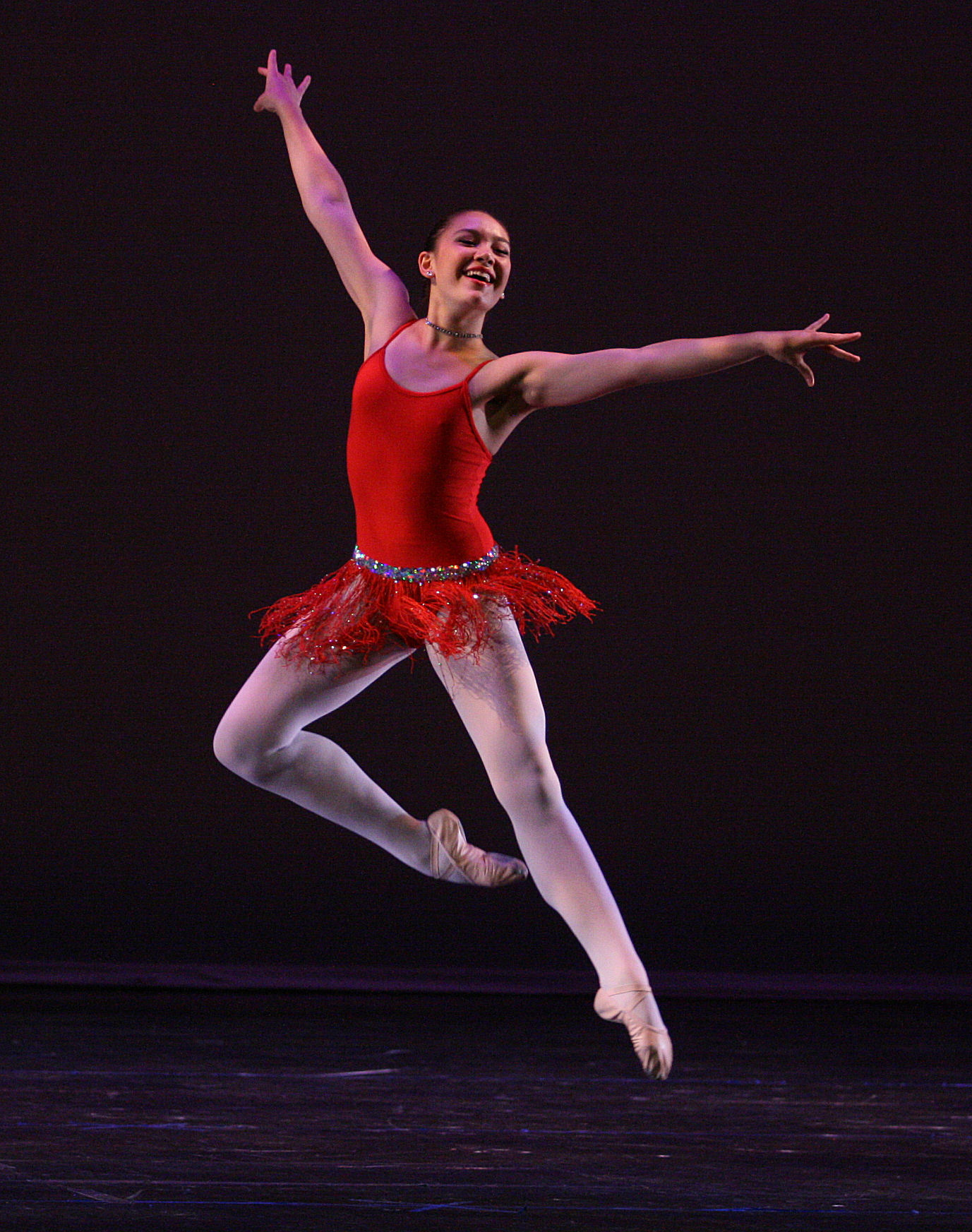
A contemporary ballet leap

Contemporary ballet is a dance genre that incorporates elements of classical ballet and modern dance. It employs classical ballet technique and in many cases classical pointe technique as well, but allows a greater range of movement of the upper body and is not constrained to the rigorously defined body lines and forms found in traditional, classical ballet. Many of its attributes come from the ideas and innovations of 20th-century modern dance, including floor work and turn-in of the legs. The style also contains many movements emphasizing the body's flexibility.

== History ==
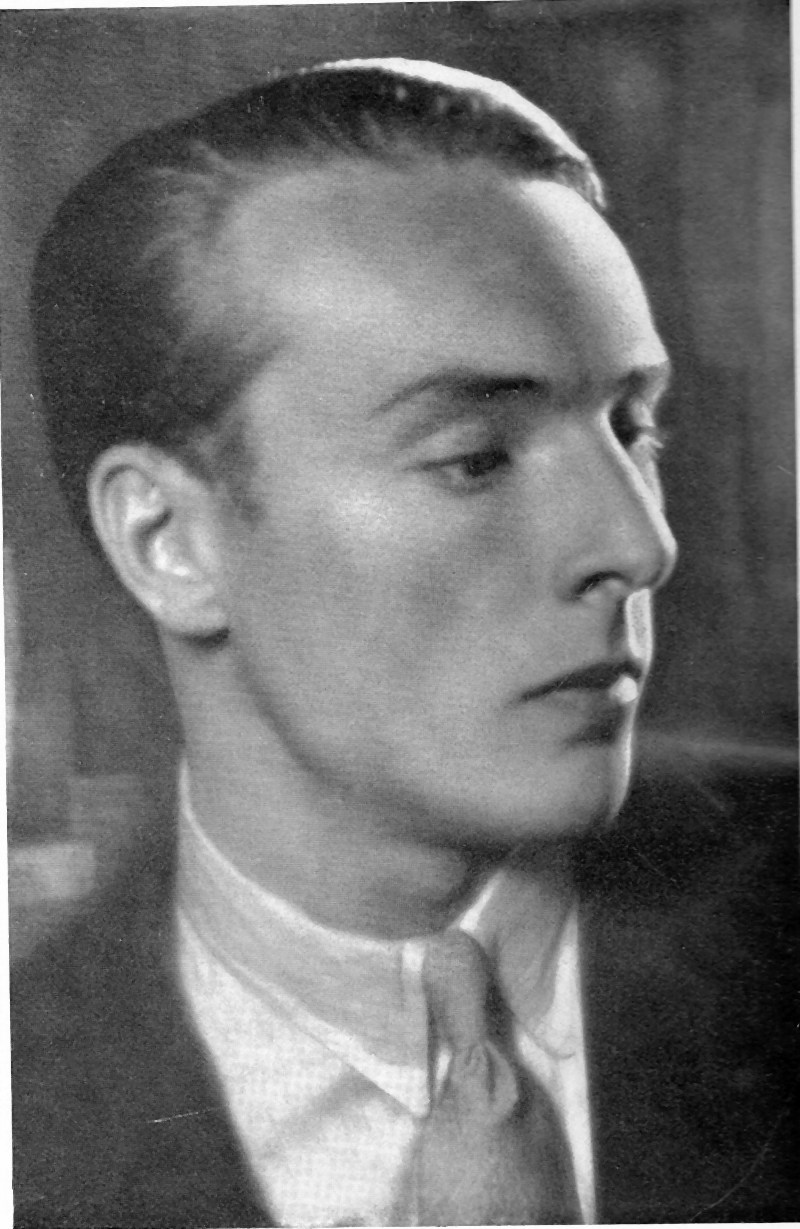
George Balanchine, a contemporary ballet pioneer

George Balanchine is often considered to have been the first pioneer of contemporary ballet. However, the true origin of contemporary ballet is credited to Russian art producer Serge Diaghilev. Diaghilev wanted to bring an understanding of the arts to the general public. He created a program that combined all forms of the arts (painting, music, theater, and art) to present to the public. When this program had success in Russia, Diaghilev was inspired to bring it to a European audience by creating a new spin on classical ballet. He created Diaghilev's Russian Ballet Company, debuting the first show in 1909. However, Diaghilev was not a choreographer, he entrusted the evolvement of his creation to several well-known choreographers, one of them being George Balanchine.

The style of dance Balanchine developed, which lies between classical ballet and today's contemporary ballet, is known by today's standards as neoclassical ballet. He used flexed hands (and occasionally feet), turned-in legs, off-centered positions, and non-traditional costumes, such as leotards, tunics, and "powder puff" tutus instead of "pancake" tutus, to distance his work from the classical and romantic ballet traditions. Balanchine invited modern dance performers such as Paul Taylor in to dance with his company, the New York City Ballet, and he worked with modern dance choreographer Martha Graham, which expanded his exposure to modern techniques and ideas. During this period, other choreographers such as John Butler and Glen Tetley began to consciously combine ballet and modern techniques in experimentation.

== Choreographers ==
One dancer who trained with Balanchine and absorbed much of this neoclassical style was Mikhail Baryshnikov. Following Baryshnikov's appointment as artistic director of the American Ballet Theatre in 1980, he worked with various modern choreographers, most notably Twyla Tharp. Tharp choreographed Push Comes To Shove for ABT and Baryshnikov in 1976; in 1986 she created In The Upper Room for her own company. Both of these pieces were considered innovative for their use of distinctly modern movements melded with the use of pointe shoes and classically trained dancers—for their use of contemporary ballet.

Tharp also worked with The Joffrey Ballet, founded in 1957 by Robert Joffrey. She choreographed Deuce Coupe for them in 1973, using pop music and a blend of modern and ballet techniques. The Joffrey Ballet continued to perform numerous contemporary pieces, many choreographed by co-founder Gerald Arpino.

Other notable contemporary choreographers include Jorma Elo, William Forsythe, Mark Morris, Jiri Kylian, Alonzo King, and Trey McIntyre.

== Technique ==
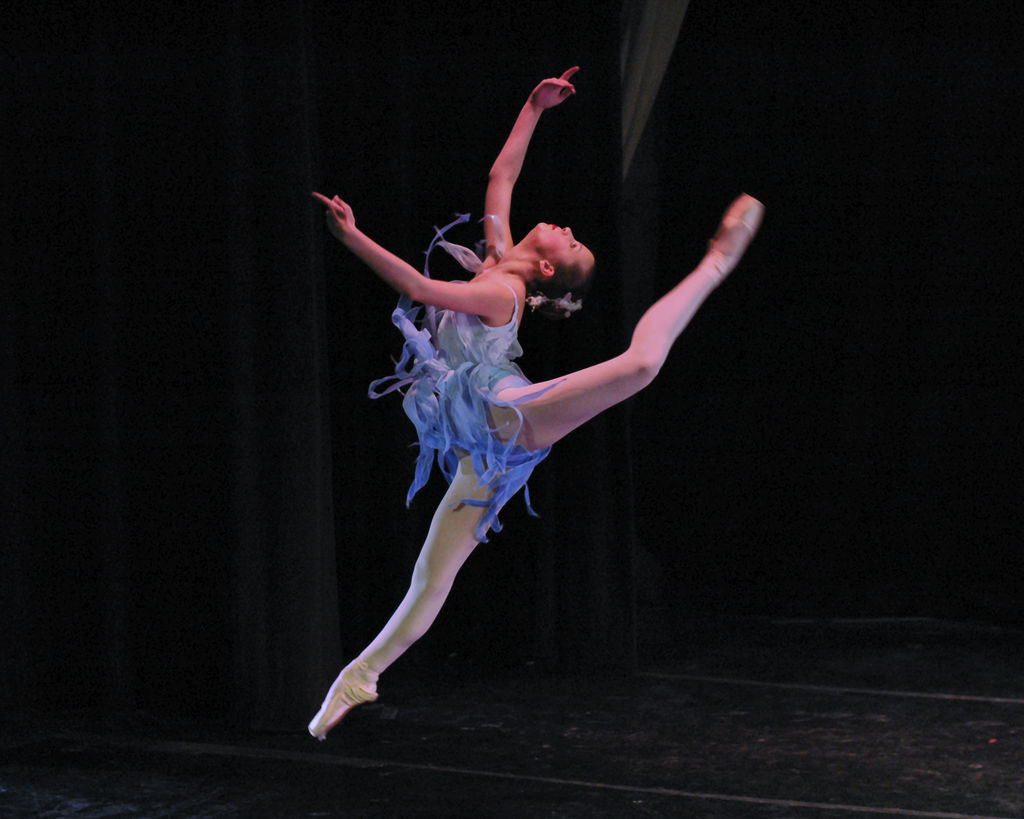
A contemporary ballet dancer

Contemporary ballet draws from both modern dance and classical ballet for its training methods and technique. For a dancer to be able to embody various styles the training regimen has become more diverse. In addition to classical technique, which often includes the signature speed and style of George Balanchine for American dancers, dancers study modern as well. In addition, many dancers do various forms of cross training. Pilates and yoga are often included to loosen muscles and align the body. Since the late 1920s, Pilates has been a popular form of cross training to help prevent injury, but increasingly, the Gyrotonic Expansion System is being utilized. With contemporary work, dancers' spines need to be more supple and they need to understand how to be grounded. This is in contrast to classical and neoclassical ballet where the dancers are required to "pull up" and the upper body is held. Dancers are required to first obtain classical ballet training in order to build on it with more modern technique in order to be more versatile. Despite formal training, dancers are often affected by ankle injuries, due to the high intensity footwork.

== Costumes ==
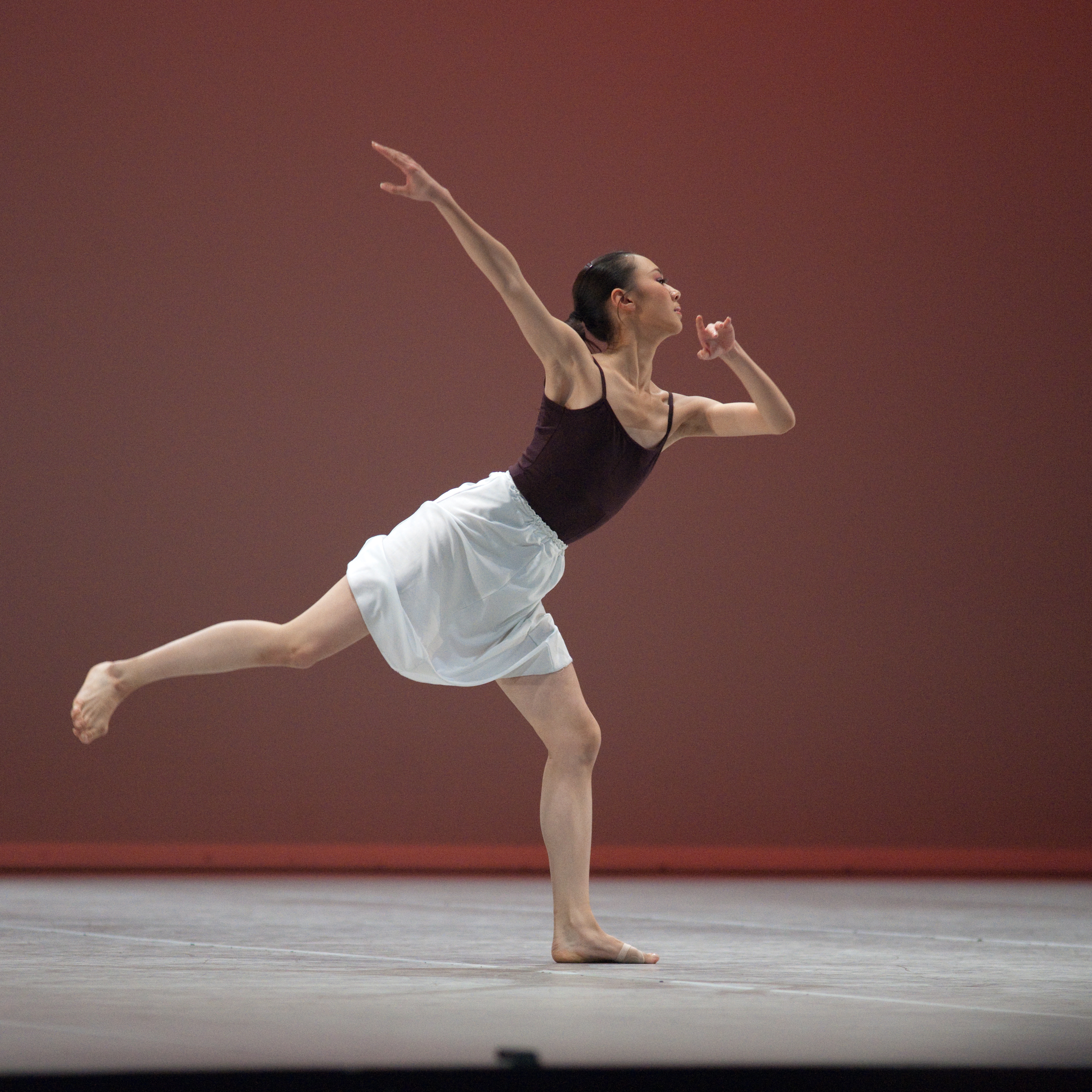
Contemporary ballet (without shoes) at the Prix de Lausanne 2010.

The costumes and footwear differ from any other style of dance as well. In contemporary ballet, dancers can be asked to wear pointe shoes, regular ballet shoes, or even no shoes at all. The same versatile approach goes for the music, setting, and costumes. Contemporary ballet does not require certain standards to be met. While it has more guidelines than modern dance, it does not conform to the limits of classical ballet. Classical ballet requires tutus, pointe shoes and scenery. Contemporary ballet uses different types of costumes, ranging from traditional to more modern tunic type versions.

The music choices may vary as well. In classical ballet, most often the choreography is done to classical music. In contemporary ballet, the music can range from the traditional classical music to popular music of today.

== Present day ==
Today there are many contemporary ballet companies and choreographers all over the world. Notable companies include Nederlands Dans Theater, Hubbard Street Dance Chicago, Complexions Contemporary Ballet, and Alonzo King LINES Ballet. Likewise, many traditionally "classical" companies also regularly perform contemporary works. Most classically trained dancers who may identify as professional ballet dancers are required to be very versatile and able to perform work ranging from classical to neoclassical to contemporary ballet to modern dance. They are required to have impeccable ballet technique with a mastery of pointe technique for women, but at the same time, are being asked to be just as comfortable in ballet slippers or bare feet performing the work of modern choreographers such as Paul Taylor or embracing Gaga in the work of Ohad Naharin.

It is very common for ballet companies to have an official choreographer in residence to create new work—often contemporary—on the company. For example, Dwight Rhoden serves as both artistic director and the primary choreographer for Complexions Contemporary Ballet. As well, many contemporary choreographers are commissioned to go to companies to create new work or a company will pay for the rights to perform already existing work and an official repetiteur will come to stage it. Twyla Tharp, as previously mentioned, is a renowned choreographer whose work is widely performed.

== See also ==
- Contemporary dance
- List of dance companies
