= Young British Dancer of the Year =

Competition for young British and British-trained classical dancers

The Young British Dancer of the Year Competition began in 2000. It is held annually at the Royal Ballet School, London and the Linbury Studio Theatre, Covent Garden. The competition is open to young British and British-trained classical dancers. The first prize is £3000, second prize £2000 and third prize £1000.

Also presented is the Sibley Dowell Award for Potential, named after Royal Ballet dance partners Antoinette Sibley and Anthony Dowell.

== Winners ==
- 2000 – 1st Jamie Bond (Birmingham Royal Ballet), 2nd Lauren Cuthbertson (Royal Ballet)
- 2001 – 1st Lauren Cuthbertson
- 2002 – 1st Anniek Soobroy (Birmingham Royal Ballet until 2011)
- 2003 – 1st Joseph Caley (English National Ballet), 2nd Antoinette Brooks-Daw (Northern Ballet)
- 2004 – 1st Aaron Robison (San Francisco Ballet), 2nd Xander Parish (Mariinsky Ballet)
- 2005 – 1st Ruth Bailey (Royal Ballet until 2014), 2nd James Barton (Birmingham Royal Ballet)
- 2006 – 1st James Hay (Royal Ballet), 2nd prize Delia Mathews (Birmingham Royal Ballet), 3rd prize Andrew Peasgood (Scottish Ballet)
- 2007 – 1st Sergei Polunin, 2nd Delia Mathews (Birmingham Royal Ballet) 3rd Nancy Osbaldeston (Royal Ballet of Flanders)
- 2008 – 1st William Bracewell (Royal Ballet), 2nd Tristan Dyer (Royal Ballet), Commendation Brandon Lawrence (Birmingham Royal Ballet)
- 2009 – 1st Yasmine Naghdi (Royal Ballet), 2nd Sean Bates (NB), 3rd Dominic Whitbrook (National Ballet of Portugal), Sibley Dowell Award Brandon Lawrence (Birmingham Royal Ballet)
- 2010 – 1st Francesca Hayward (Royal Ballet), 2nd Anna Rose O'Sullivan (Royal Ballet), 3rd Bruno Micchiardi (Estonian National Ballet), Sibley Dowell Award Dominic Whitbrook (NBP), Commendations Sean Bates (Northern Ballet, Roseanna Leney(Scottish Ballet)
- 2011 – 1st Anna Rose O'Sullivan (Royal Ballet), 2nd Teo Dubreuil (Royal Ballet), 3rd Matthew Ball (Royal Ballet), Sibley Dowell Award Reece Clarke (Royal Ballet), Commendations Tierney Heap (Royal Ballet), Greig Matthew (Joffrey Ballet)
- 2012 – 1st Reece Clarke, 2nd Barnaby Rook Bishop (Scottish Ballet), 3rd James Stephens (Vienna State Ballet), Sibley Dowell Award Suzan Opperman (Vienna State Ballet), Commendations Alexander Bird (Berlin State Ballet), Giorgio Garrett (English National Ballet)
- 2013 – 1st Chisato Katsura (Royal Ballet), 2nd Isabelle Brouwers (English National Ballet), 3rd Jerome Barnes (Scottish Ballet), Sibley Dowell Award Barnaby Rook Bishop (Scottish Ballet), Commendations Joseph Sissions (Royal Ballet), William Beagley (English National Ballet)
- 2014 – 1st Erik Woolhouse (ENB), 2nd Joseph Sissens, 3rd Nicholas Landon (Dutch National Ballet, Junior Company), Sibley Dowell Award Ricardo Castellanos (Norwegian National Ballet), Commendations Jerome Barnes, Scott McKenzie(Vienna State Ballet)

All of the 1st prize winners are current or former students of the Royal Ballet School.
