= Marcelino Sambé =

Portuguese ballet dancer

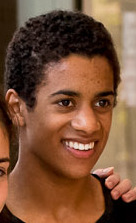
- Sambé in 2010
- Born: 29 April 1994 (age 31); Lisbon, Portugal
- Education: The Royal Ballet School
- Occupation: ballet dancer
- Career
- Current group: The Royal Ballet

Marcelino Sambé (born 29 April 1994) is a Portuguese ballet dancer. He is a principal dancer with The Royal Ballet in London.

== Early life ==
Sambé was born on International Dance Day 1994 to a Guinean father and Portuguese mother in an immigrant community on the outskirts of Lisbon. His father worked in construction. Sambé attended African dance classes at a local community centre despite being the only boy in the troupe. When he was 8, the community centre's psychologist encouraged Sambé to audition for National Conservatory of Lisbon to train ballet, even though he did not know what ballet was. He ended up improvising an African dance routine for the panel, and was accepted to the Conservatory. Soon, he started training in the Vaganova method. Sambé's father died shortly afterwards. Sambé's mother could not take care of both Sambé and his sister, so he was fostered by a family whose daughter was also training at the Conservatory, and later became a dancer at the National Ballet of Portugal.

After winning a scholarship at the Prix de Lausanne, he moved to The Royal Ballet School in London at age 16.

== Career ==
Sambé joined The Royal Ballet in 2012, a year ahead of his scheduled graduation. He was made First Artist in 2014, Soloist in 2015 and First Soloist in 2017.

In 2019, he was promoted to Principal Dancer, making him the second black male dancer, after Carlos Acosta, to reach this rank in the company. His promotion came after his debuts as Basilio in Don Quixote, for which he was coached by Acosta, and Romeo in Romeo and Juliet. Sambé' has also originated roles in works by choreographers such as Crystal Pite, Hofesh Shechter and Cathy Marston. His frequent partners on stage include Francesca Hayward, Yasmine Naghdi and Anna Rose O'Sullivan. As a choreographer himself, Sambé has choreographed for The Royal Ballet School's annual matinee and The Royal Ballet’s Draft Works.

In 2020, he was featured in the BBC documentary, Men at the Barre. That year, his debut as Prince Siegfried in Swan Lake was delayed due to the coronavirus pandemic. In 2022 he created the lead role of Pedro in Christopher Wheeldon's full-length ballet Like Water for Chocolate. A video is available at Royal Ballet and Opera Stream.

Sambé performed at the Coronation Concert in 2023, to mark the coronation of Charles III and Camilla.

== Selected repertoire ==
Sambé's repertoire with The Royal Ballet includes:

- Franz in Coppélia
- Colas in La Fille mal gardée
- Oberon in The Dream
- Hans-Peter/Nutcracker in The Nutcracker
- Romeo and Mercutio in Romeo and Juliet
- Brother Clown in The Winter’s Tale
- Lescaut and Beggar Chief in Manon
- Bratfisch and Lead Hungarian Officer in Mayerling
- Bronze Idol in La Bayadère
- Basilio in Don Quixote
- Officer in Anastasia
- Bluebird and Florestan in The Sleeping Beauty
- Pas de trois in Swan Lake
- Lead couple pas de six in Giselle
- Footman/Frog in Alice's Adventures in Wonderland
- Gypsy Boy in The Two Pigeons
- Blue Boy in Les Patineurs
- Jewels
- Aeternum
- Within the Golden Hour
- Elite Syncopations
- Tchaikovsky pas de deux
- Symphony in C
- Infra
- Concerto
- Medusa

=== Created roles ===
- Flight Pattern
- Ceremony of Innocence
- Connectome
- Untouchable
- Woolf Works
- Corybantic Games
- The Instrument in The Cellist
- Pedro Múzquiz in Like Water for Chocolate

== Awards ==
Awards:

- 2008: Moscow International Ballet Competition - silver prize
- 2009: Youth America Grand Prix - first prize
- 2010: USA International Ballet Competition - gold medal and special award
- 2011: Ursula Morton Choreographic Awards - second prize
- 2012: Youth Dance England - UK’s emerging choreographers
- 2017: Critics' Circle National Dance Awards - Outstanding Male Classical Performance
- 2019: Outstanding Male Classical Performance - Best Male Dancer
- 2023: Outstanding Male Classical Performance

== Personal life ==
Sambé is openly gay. He and his partner live in North London.

Sambé took up photography when he was recovering from an injury, and has an Instagram account dedicated to his photographs of other Royal Ballet dancers.
