= Ballett Zürich =

Swiss ballet company

Zürich Ballet

General information
- Name: Zürich Ballet
- Local name: Ballet Zürich
- Previous names: Zürich Ballet
- Principal venue: Zürich Opera House; Zürich, Canton of Zürich; Switzerland
- Website: Ballet Zürich

Artistic staff
- Artistic director: Cathy Marston

Other
- Formation: Principal; Soloist; Corps de ballet; Apprentice

Ballett Zürich, formerly known as Zürich Ballet, is the largest professional ballet company in Switzerland. Its principal venue is the Zürich Opera House and it regularly tours across the country. The company includes an ensemble cast of 36 dancers and 14 junior members. Cathy Marston has been the ballet director at the company since the 2023–24 season.

The ensemble danced in the 2012–13 season before a total of 48,061 visitors, averaging a space occupancy of 93.5%.

== History ==
Ballet Zürich emerged from Zürich's now defunct "Ballet of City Theatre".

From 1978 to 1985 Balanchine-specialist Patricia Neary held the post of ballet director. Starting in 1985, Uwe Scholz, aged 26 the youngest director of a dance company in Europe, took over the management of the Zurich Ballet until 1991. Subsequently, Bernd Roger Bienert led the Zurich Ballet until 1996. Heinz Spoerli, ballet director from 1996 to 2012, established the company as among the leading European ballet formations. A neoclassical dance style was cultivated with ballets like The Goldberg Variations, A Midsummer Night's Dream and Peer Gynt and great classical ballets such as Giselle or The Nutcracker. The company also presented works of other choreographers such as George Balanchine, Mats Ek, William Forsythe, Jiri Kylian, Hans von Manen or Twyla Tharp.

From the 2012–13 season until the 2022–2023 season, Christian Spuck, former choreographer of the Stuttgart Ballet, led the Ballet Zürich. Under his leadership, the company maintained the established traditions of the ensemble and set new artistic accents. Internationally renowned choreographers such as William Forsythe, Paul Lightfoot, Sol León, Douglas Lee, Martin Schläpfer, Jiří Kylián, Wayne McGregor, Marco Goecke, and Mats Ek have already worked with the Ballet Zürich.

In the 2023–24 season, Cathy Marston became the director of Ballett Zürich.

The Junior Ballet was founded in 2001 to promote young dancers. Fourteen members strong, it bridges the gap between young performers' formal training and their entries into professional careers. As part of an engagement that lasts no more than two years, they work together with the members of the Ballett Zürich, dance with them in selected performances of the repertoire, as well as every season in a specially arranged ballet evening with world premieres by Douglas Lee or Christian Spuck.

The performances are accompanied by a comprehensive supporting program with introductory matinees before the ballet premieres, piece introductions before the performances, ballet discussions and a variety of special children's, youth and school projects.

== The company ==
Ballett Zürich has six ranks: first soloist (known in English as principal dancer), soloist, solo with group, group with solo, group, and guest dancer. The company's roster for the 2025/26 season is as follows:

=== Principal dancers ===
Name	Nationality	Training	Other companies (inc. guest performances)
Karen Azatyan	Armenia	Yerevan Dancing Art State College Dance Academy Zürich	Bayerisches Staatsballett Hamburg Ballet
Esteban Berlanga	Spain	Royal Conservatory of Albacete Professional Dance Conservatory of Madrid	English National Ballet Spanish National Dance Company
Brandon Lawrence	United Kingdom	Royal Ballet School	Birmingham Royal Ballet
Nancy Osbaldeston	United Kingdom Belgium	English National Ballet School	English National Ballet Royal Ballet of Flanders Bayerisches Staatsballett Ballet du Capitole de Toulouse
Ayaha Tsunaki	Japan	Palucca University of Dance Dresden Hamburg Ballet School Kyouko Kanda Ballet Academy	Semperoper Ballett
Charles-Louis Yoshiyama	Japan France	Trinity College London English Ballet School	Houston Ballet Oregon Ballet Theatre

=== Soloists ===
- Inna Bilash
- Wei Chen
- Max Richter
- Shelby Williams
- Joel Woellner

=== Solo with Group ===
- Sean Bates
- Chandler Dalton
- Francesca Dell'Aria
- Jesse Fraser
- Jorge García Pérez
- Daniela Gómez Pérez
- Irmina Kopaczynska
- Mlindi Kulashe
- Sujung Lim
- Pablo Octávio
- Yun-Su Park
- Constanza Perrotta Altube
- McKhayla Pettingill

=== Group with Solo ===
- Aurore Aleman Lissitzky
- Iacopo Arregui
- Breanna Foad
- Giorgia Giani
- Marià Huguet
- Erik Kim
- Ruka Nakagawa
- Nehanda Péguillan
- Caroline Perry
- Killian Smith
- Dustin True

=== Group ===
- Greta Calzuola
- Ayaka Kano
- Lucas van Rensburg

=== Guest dancers ===
- Victor Estévez
- Alyssa Pratt
- Madoka Sugai
- Jessica Templeton
- Lucas Valente

== Notable former dancers ==
- Rudolf Nureyev
- Margot Fonteyn
- Polina Semionova
- Viktorina Kapitonova
- Debra Austin
- Ty Gurfein
- Itziar Mendizabal
- Hikaru Kobayashi
- Cathy Marston
- Leroy Mokgatle
- François Petit
