= The Cellist =

The Cellist may refer to:

- The Cellist (ballet), 2020 one-act ballet choreographed by Cathy Marston
- The Cellist (novel), 2021 novel by Daniel Silva
- The Cellist (painting), 1894 painting by Paul Gauguin
