= James Hey =

James Hey may refer to:

- James Stanley Hey (1909–2000), English physicist and radio astronomer
- James M. Vande Hey (1916–2009), United States Air Force general

== See also ==
- James Hay (disambiguation)
