= Douglas Lee =

Douglas Lee may refer to:

- Douglas Lee (restaurateur) (1962–2013), co-owner of the Big Texan Steak Ranch
- Douglas Lee (choreographer) (born 1977)

== See also ==
- Doug Lee (disambiguation)
