= Reece Clarke =

Scottish ballet dancer

- Born: 27 March 1995 (age 30)
- Education: Royal Ballet School
- Occupation: ballet dancer
- Years active: 2013–present
- Height: 6 ft 3 in (191 cm)
- Career
- Current group: The Royal Ballet

Reece Clarke (born 27 March 1995) is a Scottish ballet dancer. He joined the Royal Ballet in 2013, and was promoted to principal dancer in 2022.

== Early life and training ==
Clarke is from Airdrie, North Lanarkshire. His father was a steelworker and Clarke's mother worked as a child minder. He is the youngest of four brothers. Clarke began ballet at age three. He initially attended weekly classes at a local dance school that his brothers also attended, before he joined the Royal Ballet School Junior Associates programme, and travelled to London every weekend for training.

In 2006, the 11-year-old Clarke entered the Royal Ballet School, where all three of his brothers attended. This marked the first time four boys from the same family attended the school. The school provided a scholarship, while the Airdrie community helped fund his tuition and equipments. Clarke attended the lower school for five years, before moving to the upper school. In his second year at the upper school, he often performed with the Royal Ballet. In 2012, Clarke won Young British Dancer of the Year. The following year, he won the Lynn Seymour Prize. Clarke did not officially graduate from the school as he was offered a position from the Royal Ballet early, hence did not complete the full three years at the upper school. He nevertheless received a certificate of attendance.

== Career ==
In October 2013, weeks into Clarke's third and final year at the upper school, he was offered a position at the Royal Ballet. In 2014, Clarke performed his first major role, in Ashton's Symphonic Variations. Clarke was covering the role, but was cast to dance opposite Marianela Núñez after a dancer dropped out. In the 2015/16 season, Clarke and Federico Bonelli co-created the role of Samuel Jean Pozzi in Wheeldon's Strapless. In 2016, Clarke was promoted to first artist. Later that year, he originated a role in Edmonds' Meta. He won the Emerging Artist Award at the 2016 National Dance Awards. Other roles Clarke debuted in his early career include the Prince in The Nutcracker, Prince Florimund in The Sleeping Beauty, the First Officer in MacMillan's Anastasia, as Antigonus in Wheeldon's The Winter's Tale, in After the Rain and McGregor's Obsidian Tear.

In 2017, Clarke was promoted to soloist. That year, he originated a role in Scarlett's Symphonic Dances. In 2019, Clarke filled in as Des Grieux in Manon, when Steven McRae got injured mid-show, resulting in Clarke having ten minutes to prepare before performing with Akane Takada, whom Clarke had never danced with. In January 2020, Clarke was promoted to first soloist, shortly before he filled in for Vadim Muntagirov as the titular role in Cranko's Onegin, alongside Natalia Osipova's Tatiana. In June, during the COVID-19 pandemic, Clarke and Fumi Kaneko danced the second movement pas de deux from MacMillan's Concerto for an online performance. In October, at the first full company performance since the pandemic, Clarke and Kaneko danced Marston's In Our Wishes.

In March 2022, Clarke appeared in a gala benefitting the Disasters Emergency Committee (DEC) Ukraine Humanitarian Appeal at the London Coliseum, performing Balanchine's Tchaikovsky pas de deux with Núñez. Two months later, he danced in Royal Ballet's special performance of Swan Lake, also to raise fund for DEC, in which the lead roles were split among several dancers. Clarke danced as Prince Siegfried in the fourth act, opposite Osipova. As soloist and first soloist, Clarke had also performed as Albrecht in Giselle, in Ashton's Monotones, Enigma Variations, The Two Pigeons and Scènes de Ballet, and Wheeldon's Within the Golden Hour.

In May 2022, the Royal Ballet announced Clarke's promotion to principal dancer, which took effect at the start of the 2022/23 season.

== Personal life ==
As of 2019, Clarke lives in Chiswick, West London. In 2025 he was one of the sitters for Sky TV's Portrait Artist of the Year.
