= James Hays =

James Hays may refer to:

- James B. Hays (1840–1888), American legislator and jurist
- James D. Hays, professor of earth and environmental sciences
- James H. Hays (1800–1876), American pioneer of bituminous coal mining

== See also ==
- James Hayes (disambiguation)
- James Hay (disambiguation)
