= Cathy Marston =

British choreographer and artistic director

- Born: 1975 (age 50–51); Newcastle, England
- Occupation: Choreographer
- Known for: Director of Bern Ballett from 2007–2013

Cathy Marston (born 1975) is a British choreographer and artistic director. She was the director of Bern Ballett from 2007–2013. After her tenure, she has choreographed for companies worldwide, including The Royal Ballet, San Francisco Ballet, Joffrey Ballet, and Northern Ballet. She has been the ballet director and chief choreographer of Ballett Zürich since the 2023–2024 Season.

== Early life ==
Cathy Marston was born in Newcastle in 1975. Both of her parents were English teachers. She studied at The Royal Ballet School between 1992 and 1994.

== Career ==
Marston was a dancer at Zurich Ballet, Luzern Ballet and Bern Ballett, all based in Switzerland.

In 1997, Marston choreographed her first work for The Royal Ballet, Figure in Progress, and since created several productions for the ROH Learning and Participation department. In 2002, Marston became and Associate Artist of the Royal Opera House. Her work for the Royal Ballet are danced in Linbury Studio Theatre. In 2005, she presented her first full length work, Ghosts. In 2006, she launched a charity, The Cathy Marston Project to support her creative work. In 2007, Marston became the director of Bern Ballett in Switzerland, she held the position until 2013. Since 2013, she had been commissioned internationally, including UK, Switzerland, Germany, Austria, Finland, Denmark, Poland, US, Canada, Poland, Cuba, Hong Kong and Australia.

Marston is best known for narrative ballet, with women as lead characters. However, Marston said it was not intentional.

In 2016, Marston's Jane Eyre, base on the novel of the same name by Charlotte Brontë debuted at Northern Ballet. It was praised by the British critic. The production toured in the UK, and a revival of an enlarged version performed at Sadler's Wells Theatre in London. In 2019, the production was danced by the American Ballet Theatre, with Devon Teuscher, Isabella Boylston and Misty Copeland dancing the title role. On the same year, Joffrey Ballet in Chicago also danced Jane Eyre.

Marston also choreographed Victoria, based on Queen Victoria's life. It is a co-production between Northern Ballet and National Ballet of Canada. Northern Ballet premiered the work in 2019 in Leeds, and toured the production in UK, including at Sadler's Wells. The work was screened in cinemas and later broadcast on BBC4. The work was also produced on a DVD. It was also Premier Dancer Pippa Moore's last role before retiring. Moore danced Queen Victoria's youngest daughter, Princess Beatrice. The Northern American premiere, which will be danced by National Ballet of Canada, was originally scheduled in 2021, but is delayed to 2022 to make way for a world premiere which was postponed due to COVID-19 coronavirus pandemic.

Marston's first Royal Ballet main stage production, The Cellist, premiered in 2020. It is a one-act work based on Jacqueline du Pré's life, with Lauren Cuthbertson as the titular Cellist, Matthew Ball as her husband Daniel Barenboim and Marcelino Sambé as her cello. Marston consulted du Pré's friends and Barenboim, and spoke to people with Multiple sclerosis, including Marston's mother, for the work. The work was relayed in cinemas worldwide and will be released as a DVD. The Cellist was one of the productions available to stream online during the 2019-20 coronavirus pandemic.

In 2021, it was announced that Marston will succeed Christian Spuck as Ballett Zürich's ballet director and chief choreographer.

== Personal life ==
Marston has a qualification as a life coach.

== Notable works ==
- before the tempest…after the storm for Royal Ballet, 2004
- Ghosts for Royal Ballet, 2005
- Wuthering Heights (Sturmhöhe) for Bern Ballett, 2009
- Clara for Bern Ballett, 2010
- Witch-hunt (Hexenhatz) for Bern Ballett, 2013
- Three Sisters for Ballett im Revier, 2014
- Lolita for Copenhagen Summer Ballet, 2015
- Jane Eyre for Northern Ballet, 2016
- Hamlet for Ballett im Revier, 2017
- The Suit for Ballet Black, 2018
- Snowblind for San Francisco Ballet, 2018
- Lady Chatterley’s Lover for Les Grands Ballets Canadiens, 2018
- Victoria for Northern Ballet and National Ballet of Canada, 2019
- The Cellist for Royal Ballet, 2020
- Against the Tide for Royal Ballet and Ballet Zurich, 2025
