= The Cellist (ballet) =

Ballet choreographed by Cathy Marston

- Choreographer: Cathy Marston
- Music: Philip Feeney
- Libretto: Cathy Marston; Edward Kemp
- Premiere: 17 February 2020; Royal Opera House
- Original ballet company: The Royal Ballet
- Design: Hildegard Bechtler; Bregje van Balen
- Created for: Lauren Cuthbertson
- Genre: contemporary ballet

The Cellist is a one-act ballet about British cellist Jacqueline du Pré, choreographed by Cathy Marston, with the scenario devised by Marston and Edward Kemp. The music was written by Philip Feeney and incorporated scores du Pré was best known for. The ballet is Marston's first Royal Ballet main stage production, and premiered on 17 February 2020 at the Royal Opera House, with the title role danced by Lauren Cuthbertson. The work is set in England during the 1960s and 1970s.

== Production ==
=== Conception ===
Choreographer Cathy Marston had worked with The Royal Ballet since 1997, but never on its main stage until The Cellist. She first had the idea of using a dancer as a cello when she was making Dangerous Liaison for the Royal Danish Ballet as she wanted to avoid props. She then considered to make a ballet with a cello. When Royal Ballet artistic director Kevin O'Hare asked Marston to give suggestions for a ballet, which would be her first main stage production for the company, her sister, a drama teacher who let her students improv with a cello, proposed using Jacqueline du Pré as the subject. Du Pré was regarded as one of the best cellists of all time, but her career was cut short due to multiple sclerosis (MS), and she died at age 42. Marston's mother having MS was not a factor in choosing du Pré.

=== Development ===
Before Marston started working on the ballet, she and O'Hare met du Pré's husband Daniel Barenboim in Berlin to have his blessing. Marston recalled Barenboim "was both charming and charmed by the idea," and according to O'Hare, Barenboim said, "Make me handsome," at the end of the meeting. Barenboim allowed Marston to portray him as the conductor, even though he was usually the pianist when he and du Pré performed together. Marston also read books about du Pré and took cello classes "to get a sense of the instrument," but believed that she would not continue after the ballet was complete. She spoke to both people who knew du Pré and people with MS, including her mother.

Marston devised the scenario of the ballet with Edward Kemp, a frequent collaborator of her, and Kemp also served as the dramaturg. She had no intention of exploring du Pré's private life, and wanted to focus on the "love and loss" between her with her cello, therefore the ballet is deliberately titled The Cellist. The ballet also explores "what it means to be an artist and find your voice" rather than "technical quality."

Like Dangerous Liaison, Marston chose to use a male dancer to personify the cello, and described the role as "the instrument, and music personified, and to some extent fate." The corps de ballet is used as "A Chorus of Narrators" and appears as the orchestra, the audience, friends, and MS symptoms which Marston said was "from an experiential rather than a scientific point of view," especially the "long period of anxiety" du Pré had before her diagnosis.

The music was a commissioned score by Philip Feeney, which incorporated some of the music du Pré was best known for. Originally, Elgar's Cello Concerto was not included, but Marston decided to include a scene with Barenboim conducting du Pré the concerto, which never happened. Upon Barenboim's approval, Feeney rewrote the score. In the final product, the Elgar concerto is featured prominently. At the premiere, solo cellist Hetty Snell performed in the orchestra pit.

The set was designed by Hildegard Bechtler and was inspired by the inside of a cello. Bregje van Balen, a former dancer, designed the costumes.

=== Dancers ===
In the original production, Lauren Cuthbertson was cast as du Pré (credited as "The Cellist). Marston had wanted to work with Cuthbertson since 2002, when a 17-year-old Cuthbertson stepped in last minute to dance the central role in a new Marston piece. Cuthbertson did in-depth research, studied cello and spoke to MS patients in preparation for the role.

Marcelino Sambé portrayed "The Instrument", and Marston commented, "His body is so supple, movement just bursts out of him. If you were going to personify music – that’s him." Barenboim ("The Conductor") was danced by Matthew Ball. Ball said playing Barenboim was "quite intimidating," and his portrayal was from "a slightly more innocent time."

Other dancers who had performed at the premiere included Royal Ballet School student Emma Lucano as the young cellist, Thomas Whitehead as her father, Kristen McNally as her mother, Anna Rose O'Sullivan as her sister, and Gary Avis as a teacher. The second cast include Beatriz Stix-Brunell as the Cellist, Calvin Richardson as the Instrument and Ball as the Conductor.

== Critical reception ==
The Cellist received positive to mixed reviews. In a five-star review, The Telegraph's Mark Monahan wrote, "Magical, supremely romantic (Romantic, even), and stirring right from the start, The Cellist – co-created with dramaturg Edward Kemp – is a supreme case in point." Lyndsey Winship of The Guardian gave it four stars, and commented, "The Cellist is most effective as a portrait of a woman’s deep love affair with music." Will Gompertz of the BBC also gave it four stars and called it "beautiful". The Times's Debra Craine gave it three stars and was more critical: "too long and sags in the middle," while the Evening Standard's Emma Byrne commented that the corps de ballet was "cluttered, distracting – and unnecessarily busy."

== Accolades ==
Year	Award	Category	Recipients and nominees	Result	Ref.
2021	National Dance Awards	Best Classical Choreography	Cathy Marston	Won	
2021	National Dance Awards	Outstanding Female Classical Performance	Lauren Cuthbertson	Won	
2021	National Dance Awards	Outstanding Female Classical Performance	Beatriz Stix-Brunell	Nominated	
2021	National Dance Awards	Outstanding Male Classical Performance	Marcelino Sambé	Won	

== Videography ==
A performance on 25 February 2020 was relayed in cinemas. In June that year, in response to the impact of the 2019–20 coronavirus pandemic on the performing arts, the Royal Opera House released the footage of the full ballet online.
