= Summerscale =

Summerscale or Summerscales is a surname. Notable people with the surname include:

- Aaron Summerscale (born 1969), English chess player
- Bill Summerscales (born 1949), English footballer
- Kate Summerscale (born 1965), English writer and journalist
- Laurretta Summerscales, British ballerina
