= Laurretta Summerscales =

British ballet dancer

- Born: 1993 (age 32–33); Surrey, England
- Education: English National Ballet School
- Years active: 2009–present
- Spouse: Yonah Acosta (m. 2017)
- Dancing career
- Current group: Bavarian State Ballet
- Former groups: English National Ballet

Laurretta Summerscales (born 1993) is a British ballet dancer. She is a principal dancer with Bavarian State Ballet and previously with the English National Ballet.

== Early life ==
Laurretta Summerscales grew up in Woking, Surrey, England. Her mother runs the Karen Clarke Theatre School in Surrey (where Summerscales sometimes teaches), and her father works in information technology. She began dancing at the age of three, at her mother's school.

Summerscales began her training at the English National Ballet School in 2007, having won a scholarship to study there, she was 16 at the time. Also in 2007, Summerscales was a finalist for the Young British Dancer of the Year competition.

== Career ==
In 2009, at age 18, Summerscales was offered a contract to join the English National Ballet, 18 months after she started training at the English National Ballet School and a year before she was supposed to graduate.

Five months after she joined the company, she danced her first principal role, Myrtha in Giselle, and found out she had to dance the role two days before the performance. The Evening Standard called her "the rising star of English ballet", and speculated that she might be "the new Darcey Bussell".

Summerscales was promoted to first soloist at the end of the 2012/13 season, and made her debut as Odette-Odile in Swan Lake in 2013. She was named a principal dancer in January 2016.

In September 2017, she joined the Bavarian State Ballet in Munich as a Principal dancer. In 2018, she left the English National Ballet and began to dance full-time in Munich.

== Selected repertoire ==
- Alice in Alice's Adventure in Wonderland
- Nikiya in La Bayadère
- Giselle and Myrtha in Giselle (Mary Skeaping)
- Myrtha in Giselle (Peter Wright)
- Myrtha and Bathilde in Giselle (Akram Khan)
- Odette/Odile in Swan Lake
- Clara/Sugar Plum in The Nutcracker (Wayne Eagling)
- The Ballerina/Louise in The Nutcracker
- Marie in The Nutcracker (Andrey Petrov)
- Madora and Gulnara in Le Corsaire
- Juliet in Romeo and Juliet (Rudolf Nureyev)
- Swanilda and Prayer in Coppélia
- Lise in La Fille Mal Gardée
- Carmen in Carmen (Carlos Acosta)
- Kitri in Don Quixote
- Tatiana and Olga in Onegin
- Anna and Kitty in Anna Karenina
- Rubies in Jewels
- Helena in A Midsummer Night's Dream (John Neumeier)
- Lilac Fairy in The Sleeping Beauty
- Pas de trois in Suite en Blanc
- Firebird and The Purist Lady in The Firebird
- In the Middle, Somewhat Elevated
- Petit Mort
- Fantastic Beings

== Personal life ==
In summer 2017, she married fellow English National Ballet dancer Yonah Acosta, originally from Cuba, and the nephew of Carlos Acosta. They lived in Woking during their time in ENB. They are now based in Munich, Germany. The couple have one daughter.
