= Thorowgood =

Thorowgood is a surname. Notable people with the surname include:

- Thomas Thorowgood (1595–c. 1669), English Puritan minister and preacher
- William Thorowgood (died 1877), British typographer and type founder

== See also ==
- Thorogood
