= James Hayes =

James, Jim, or Jimmy Hayes may refer to:

== Law and politics ==
- James Hayes (Prince Rupert's secretary) (1637–1694), Prince Rupert's secretary and first Deputy Governor of the Hudson's Bay Company
- James Hayes (died c. 1731) (1676–bef. – 1731/32), British MP for Winchelsea
- James Hayes (1715-1800), British MP for Downton
- James Hayes (Australian politician) (1831–1908), Australian politician from New South Wales
- James A. Hayes (1921–2000), American politician from California
- James C. Hayes (born 1946), American pastor and politician, mayor of Fairbanks, Alaska
- Jimmy Hayes (born 1946), American politician from Louisiana
- James P. Hayes (born 1964), American politician from New York

== Religion ==
- James Thomas Hayes (bishop) (1847–1904), English Anglican bishop of Trinidad and Tobago
- James Hayes (bishop) (1889–1980), American archbishop of Cagayan de Oro
- James Martin Hayes (1924–2016), Canadian prelate of the Roman Catholic Church

== Sports ==
- Jim Hayes (baseball) (1913–1993), American baseball player
- Jim Hayes (American football) (1940–2001), American football defensive lineman
- Jim Hayes (basketball) (1948–2009), American basketball player
- Jimmy Hayes (ice hockey) (1989–2021), American ice hockey player
- James Hayes (cricketer) (born 2001), English cricketer

== Others ==
- James E. Hayes (1865–1898), Supreme Knight of the Knights of Columbus
- James L. Hayes (1915–1989), American educator
- James Hayes (historian) (1930–2023), Hong Kong historian

== See also ==
- James Hays (disambiguation)
- James Hay (disambiguation)
