= Lifecasting (ballet) =

Lifecasting is a ballet choreographed by Douglas Lee for the New York City Ballet to the third movement of Ryoji Ikeda's Opus 1 (2000–2001) and Steve Reich's Triple Quartet (1998). The premiere took place on Thursday, 22 January 2009 at the David H. Koch Theater, Lincoln Center. Lee has previously made dances for City Ballet’s New York Choreographic Institute. Costumes were designed by Ines Alda and lighting by Mark Stanley.

== Original cast ==
- Ashley Bouder
- Sterling Hyltin
- Maria Kowroski
- Kaitlyn Gilliland
- Georgina Pazcoguin
- Antonio Carmena
- Robert Fairchild
- Craig Hall
- Amar Ramasar
- Adrian Danchig-Waring
- Christian Tworzyanski

== See also ==
- List of ballets by title
