= Julian MacKay =

American ballet dancer (born 1997)

- Born: 28 October 1997 (age 29); Livingston, Montana, U.S.
- Education: Bolshoi Ballet Academy; Russian Institute of Theatre Arts
- Occupation: ballet dancer
- Years active: 2015–present
- Dancing career
- Former groups: Bavarian State Ballet; The Royal Ballet; Mikhailovsky Ballet; San Francisco Ballet

Julian MacKay (born 28 October 1997) is an American ballet dancer. He is the first American to have completed both the lower and upper schools at the Bolshoi Ballet Academy in Moscow. In 2016, he joined the Mikhailovsky Ballet as a second soloist, where he later reached the rank of first soloist. Between 2020 and 2022, he was a principal dancer at the San Francisco Ballet. From 2022 through 2026, he was a Principal Dancer with the Bavarian State Ballet.

== Early life and training ==
Mackay was born in Livingston, Montana, and raised in Bozeman, Montana. Both of his elder sisters Maria Sascha Khan and Nadia Khan danced professionally, and his younger brother Nicholas MacKay would also attend ballet schools in Russia. MacKay started ballet at age four. He initially trained in his home state, and attended summer programs elsewhere, including at the Royal Ballet School and American Ballet Theatre.

In 2009, after winning a bronze medal at the Youth America Grand Prix, he attended a summer program Bolshoi Ballet Academy in Moscow. Then, the 11-year-old MacKay was invited to attend the academy full time, with his mother also moving to Moscow. MacKay became fluent in Russian within a year. Between 2014 and 2015, MacKay won several awards at international competition, including the 2015 Prix de Lausanne. MacKay graduated in 2015. He is the first American to have completed both the lower and upper schools, for which he received the full Russian diploma.

MacKay attended a Russian Institute of Theater Arts four-year program to be qualified as a ballet master, choreographer or company director.

== Career ==
Whilst a student, MacKay made his professional debut with the Russian State Ballet, dancing as Siegfried in Swan Lake during the company's tour in Germany and Switzerland. After his win at the Prix de Lausanne in 2015, MacKay was awarded an apprenticeship scholarship to a partner company of his choosing. He completed the yearlong apprenticeship at the Royal Ballet.

In 2016, MacKay joined the St. Petersburg-based Mikhailovsky Ballet as a second soloist. The opportunity came when he met company ballet master in chief Mikhail Messerer while auditioning for another company. At 18, he is the youngest person to hold a soloist position at the company. Months after joining the company, he was given his first full-length lead role, James in La Sylphide. He was promoted to first soloist after dancing a lead role in Flames of Paris. MacKay also danced principal and solo roles in Giselle, Cinderella, The Sleeping Beauty, The Nutcracker, Le Corsaire, La Bayadère and Laurencia, among others. He made his choreographic debut with The Little Humpbacked Horse, which starred all three of his siblings.

In 2020, MacKay returned to the United States and joined the San Francisco Ballet as a principal dancer. He made his company debut at the virtual gala in January 2021, held due to the COVID-19 pandemic. In April 2022, MacKay's term in San Francisco ended, and he stated his contract was not renewed by incoming artistic director Tamara Rojo.

In July 2022, MacKay joined the Bavarian State Ballet as a principal dancer.. In July 2026, his employment was terminated with immediate effect.
