= Ty Gurfein =

American ballet dancer

Tyler Gurfein
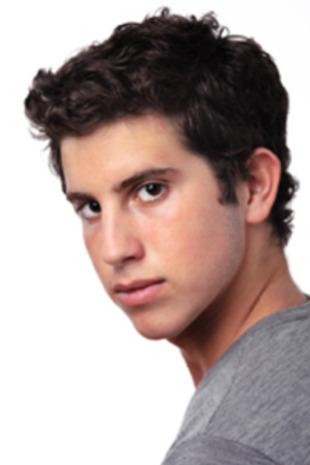
- Born: Tyler Gurfein; November 4, 1989 (age 36); Manhattan, New York, U.S.
- Occupation: Dancer
- Career
- Current group: Staatsballett Berlin
- Former groups: Ballet Zurich American Ballet Theatre Morphoses- The Wheeldon Company

Tyler Gurfein (born November 4, 1989, in Manhattan, New York) is an American dancer performing with the Staatsballett Berlin in Berlin, Germany and previously with Ballett Zürich in Zürich, Switzerland and Morphoses/The Wheeldon Company

He trained at the School of American Ballet under Olga Kostriskii and Peter Boal and later at the Jacqueline Kennedy Onassis School at American Ballet Theatre under John Meehan and Franco Devita. In 2007 he then joined ABT Studio Company or ABT II.

Tyler Gurfein has performed in countries such as U.S.A, Canada, Mexico, Costa Rica, Switzerland, Germany, Austria, Spain, Italy, Greece, Denmark, Holland, France, United Kingdom, Turkey, Israel, Andorra and Thailand. He has worked with choreographers such as William Forsythe, Jiri Kylian, Mats Ek, Lightfoot/Leon, Marco Goecke, Heinz Spoerli, Christian Spuck, Crystal Pite, Christopher Wheeldon, Alexei Ratmansky, Nacho Duato and many more.

In July 2012, Gurfein danced at the Salzburger Festspiele Salzburg Festival in Salzburg, Austria works by Heinz Spoerli

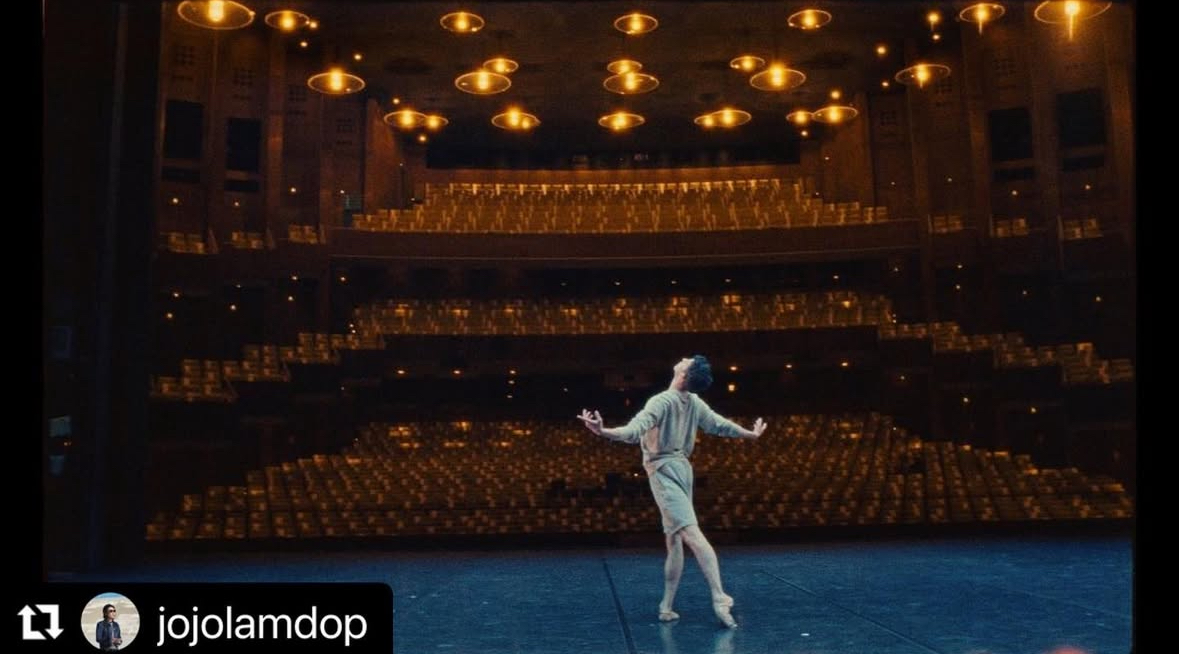
Tyler Gurfein

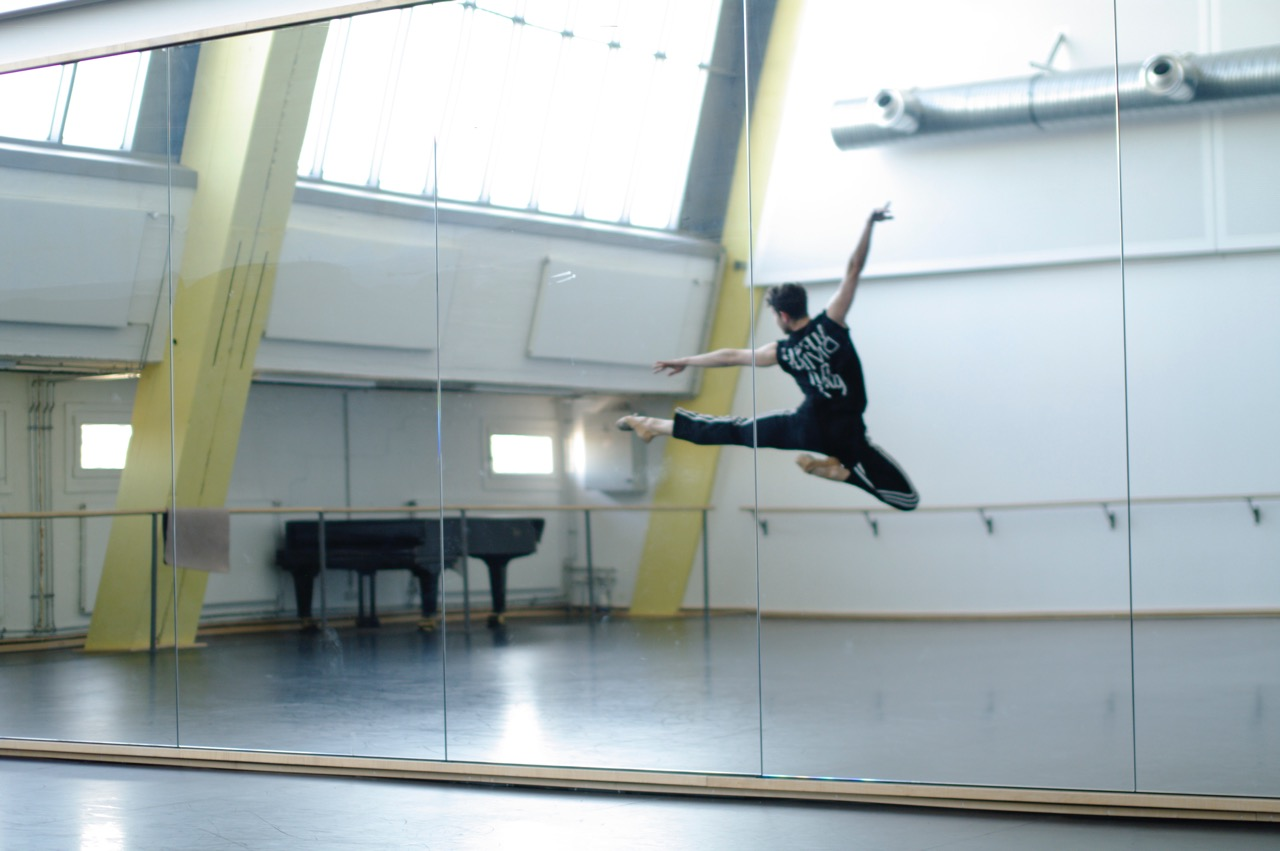
Tyler Gurfein

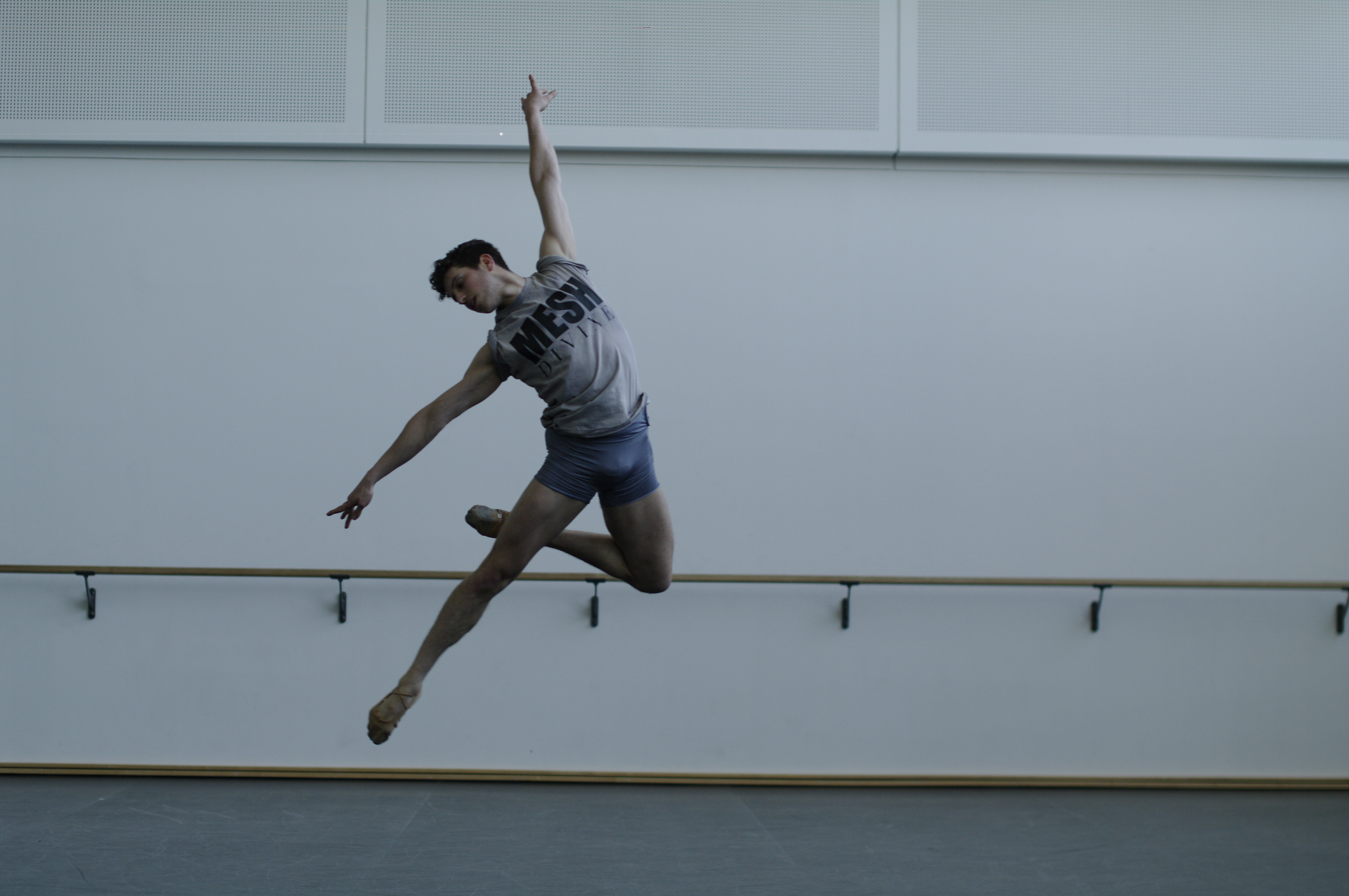
Tyler Gurfein

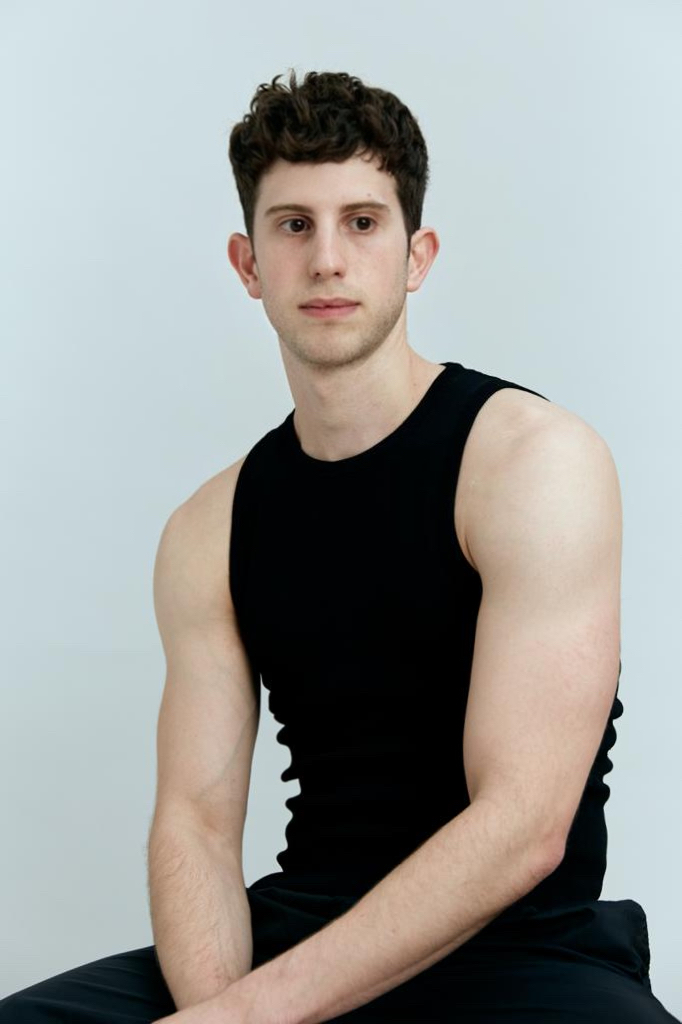
Tyler Gurfein
