= Thorogood =

Thorogood is a surname. Notable people with the surname include:

- Alfreda Thorogood (born 1942), English ballet dancer and teacher
- Alison Thorogood (born 1960), British sprint canoer
- George Thorogood (born 1950), American blues rock musician
- Ian Thorogood (1936–2019), Australian footballer
- Jack Thorogood (1911–1970), English footballer
- Martina Thorogood (born 1975), Venezuelan beauty queen
- Robert Thorogood (born 1972), English screenwriter
- Tim Thorogood (born 1962), Chief Executive of the Falkland Islands
