= Alice's Adventures in Wonderland (ballet) =

2011 ballet by Christopher Wheeldon

- Choreographer: Christopher Wheeldon
- Music: Joby Talbot
- Based on: Alice's Adventures in Wonderland by Lewis Carroll
- Premiere: 28 February 2011; Royal Opera House
- Original ballet company: The Royal Ballet
- Design: Bob Crowley
- Setting: Wonderland
- Created for: Lauren Cuthbertson
- Type: Classical ballet

Alice's Adventures in Wonderland is a ballet in three acts by Christopher Wheeldon with a scenario by Nicholas Wright, based on Alice's Adventures in Wonderland by Lewis Carroll. It was commissioned by The Royal Ballet, Covent Garden, and the National Ballet of Canada, and had its world premiere on Monday, 28 February 2011. The music by Joby Talbot is the first full-length score (1 hour 40 minutes) for the Royal Ballet in 20 years. It is also the first full-length narrative ballet commissioned by The Royal Ballet since 1995.

== Production ==
The work is based on Lewis Carroll's 1865 well-known children's book Alice's Adventures in Wonderland. Wheeldon was attracted by the physicality of the characters and the perfect central role for a ballerina: "The Royal Ballet already has a wealth of full-blooded ballets. I wanted to create something lighter and more friendly." He chose Lauren Cuthbertson for the lead role of Alice as someone who could "captivate the audience and make them believe in Alice." As for the music, Talbot explained that he "wanted to find a new sound, the right timbre for Wonderland." His orchestral score has a large percussion section and four female voices.

Karen Kain, the artistic director of National Ballet of Canada contacted the Royal Ballet and proposed a co-production after learning about the ballet. The company had the production's North American premiere in 2011, starring Jillian Vanstone.

By 2012, Wheeldon had changed the structure of the ballet so that it consisted of three acts instead of the original two and had inserted an additional pas de deux for Alice and the Knave.

The ballet had since been performed by Royal Swedish Ballet in 2016, Royal Danish Ballet in the 2016–17 season, The Australian Ballet in 2017, and by the New National Theatre, Tokyo in June 2022. Amongst others.

== Instrumentation ==
Alice's Adventures in Wonderland is scored for the following orchestra:

Woodwinds: Piccolo I and II, flute I, II and III, oboe I and II, oboe d'amore, cor anglais, clarinet I in B♭, II in B♭ and III in B♭, clarinet in E♭, bass clarinet in B♭, bassoon I and II, contrabassoon

Brass: 4 French horns in F, ram's horn, piccolo trumpet in B♭, 3 trumpets in B♭, 2 tenors, bass trombone, tuba

Percussion: timpani, xylophone, marimba, vibraphone, crotales, glockenspiel, keyed glockenspiel, handbells, tubular bells, church bell in G, 3 tam-tams, bass drum, cymbal and pedal bass drum set, side drum with snare drums, kick drum, 2 tom toms, rototom, "Trash": pots, pans etc, triangle, zill, 2 China cymbals, sizzle cymbal, clashed cymbals, 3 suspended cymbals, hi-hat, bell tree, mark tree, jingle bells, cowbell, clapper, 2 tambourines, string drum, wind machine, thunder sheet, ratchet, football rattle, castanets, claves, 2 woodblocks, 3 temple blocks, frog guiro, shaker, dumbek, riq

2 Harps

Piano, celesta

4 female singers

Strings: first violins, second violins, violas, cellos and double basses.

== Characters ==
Oxford Characters:

- Alice: the original protagonist in Lewis Carroll's novel, in which she is a child; in the ballet she is a teenager beginning her first romance.
- Henry Liddell and his wife: Alice's parents; her father is the vice-chancellor of Oxford.
- Lewis Carroll: the author of Alice's Adventures in Wonderland
- Lorina and Edith: Alice's two sisters.
- Jack: the gardener's boy who is sent away after being falsely accused of stealing a jam tart. (In actuality, Alice gave it to him.)

Wonderland Characters

- The Queen of Hearts: a homicidal monarch wearing blood red and terrorizing everyone in sight. Played by the same dancer who plays Alice's mother.
- The King of Hearts: Played by the same dancer who plays Alice's father.
- White Rabbit: the Queen's assistant, frightened of his employer. Portrayed by the same dancer who plays Lewis Carroll.
- Knave of Hearts: one of a pack of playing cards, he is accused of stealing jam tarts and stands trial. Played by the same dancer who plays Jack.
- The Duchess: a lady of Wonderland who is invited to play croquet with the Queen.
- The Frog: butler to the Duchess.
- The Fish: letter-carrier of Wonderland.
- The Cheshire Cat: a mysterious grinning cat whom Alice asks for directions.
- Mad Hatter, March Hare & Dormouse: three characters whom Alice encounters having a tea party.
- Caterpillar: an exotic insect who gives Alice a piece of hallucinogenic mushroom to eat.

== Plot ==
=== Act 1 ===
Alice's parents are holding a garden party. She is very upset to see her friend Jack, the gardener's boy, dismissed by her mother on a false charge of stealing a jam tart. Lewis Carroll, a friend of the family, is present and to console her he offers to take her photograph. Alice is surprised to see him emerge from his camera cloth as a White Rabbit and when he disappears into his camera bag she follows him and falls down into Wonderland. She sees a magical garden which she cannot enter because all the doors are locked. Jack appears, transformed into the Knave of Hearts, and accused by the Queen of Hearts of stealing a tray of tarts. He is fleeing from her, her guards and the White Rabbit. Alice tries to follow but the door closes before her. She is too big to get through the only unlocked door. She is given a bottle and when she drinks from it she becomes too small to reach the door handle. She then successively becomes very large and so small that she can swim, together with various animals, in a lake formed by her tears. After this, she arranges a race to dry them off. The White Rabbit then leads her further into Wonderland, where she is given a piece of paper inviting a Duchess to attend the Queen of Hearts' croquet party. Alice carries the invitation into a cottage, where she finds the Duchess nursing a baby while a cook makes sausages. The duchess is delighted at the invitation, while the cook is resentful, and the atmosphere becomes violent apart from an interval when a mysterious Cheshire Cat appears. Alice tries to protect the baby, but it turns into a pig and the Duchess takes it to be turned into sausages. The White Rabbit reappears, and then the Knave, who is carrying the tarts and pursued by the Queen's guards. The White Rabbit conceals them and then has to go to the garden party. Alice wants to go with him but the White Rabbit and Knave agree that it is too dangerous for her to be in the presence of the bad-tempered Queen and blindfold her to stop her.

=== Act 2 ===
Alice asks the Cheshire Cat for directions where to go, but his instructions are vague and confusing. She then finds herself at the tea party of a Mad Hatter, a March Hare and a Dormouse. She escapes and then finds herself alone and lost, but her spirits are lifted by a caterpillar perched on a mushroom, who gives her a piece of mushroom. She eats the mushroom and the doors and walls disappear so that at last she is able to enter the magic garden. The Knave appears, still pursued by the Queen and her guards, and he escapes, followed by the White Rabbit and Alice.

=== Act 3 ===
Alice is in the Queen's garden, and she finds the gardeners painting the roses red, as they have mistakenly planted white ones even though the Queen detests them. The Queen arrives, together with the King, the Duchess and the cook. The gardeners have not finished painting the roses and the Queen orders their execution. Alice and the White Rabbit smuggle the gardeners away while the executioner is distracted by the seductive cook. The Queen shows off her skill at dancing, after which she plays croquet with the Duchess. Flamingos are the mallets and hedgehogs the balls. The knave has taken a great risk to be with Alice and they are reunited. The Duchess is much better than the Queen at croquet, who resorts to cheating. The Duchess challenges the Queen, who orders her execution, but Alice helps the Duchess to escape while the King calms the Queen down. The Knave is again reunited with Alice but he is caught and the Queen orders him to be taken to the castle to stand trial. The Cheshire Cat reappears and Alice follows the Knave to the castle. At the trial, the witnesses accuse the Knave. The King insists that the Knave is heard in his own defence, but this produces little effect and so Alice intervenes, and together they win over everyone but the Queen, who seizes an axe to carry out the execution herself. The knave and Alice try to escape with the help of the White Rabbit and the witnesses, but the Queen finds them. Unable to escape, Alice pushes over a witness, who falls on someone else and starts a chain reaction of all the court falling over. They are only playing cards. Alice wakes up.

== Reviews of premiere ==
The premiere was well received by the audience although some reviewers commented on an excessively long first act. Wheeldon's choreography sometimes had to fight for attention, given all the special staging effects. Joby Talbot's exuberant score was credited with providing sophisticated, danceable music with vividly descriptive melodies. Lauren Cuthbertson's performance was said to be "alert, funny and deliciously un-twee". Writing in The Daily Telegraph, Sarah Crompton commented: "Wheeldon's Alice will undoubtedly be hugely popular; it's colourful, enjoyable fun. But it needed a little more dance and a little less action to take its place alongside those English story ballets the choreographer himself so admires.".

== Casts ==
Role	World premiere	2017 DVD
Alice	Lauren Cuthbertson	Lauren Cuthbertson
Jack/The Knave of Hearts	Sergei Polunin	Federico Bonelli
Lewis Carroll/The White Rabbit	Edward Watson	James Hay
Mother/The Queen of Hearts	Zenaida Yanowsky	Laura Morera
Father/The King of Hearts	Christopher Saunders	Christopher Saunders
Magician/The Mad Hatter	Steven McRae	Steven McRae
Rajah/The Caterpillar	Eric Underwood	Fernando Montaño
The Duchess	Simon Russell Beale	Gary Avis
Vicar/The March Hare	Ricardo Cervera	Paul Kay
Verger/The Dormouse	James Wilkie	Romany Pajdak
The Cook	Kristen McNally	Kristen McNally
Footman/Fish	Ludovic Ondiviela	Tristan Dyer
Footman/Frog	Kenta Kura	David Yudes
Alice's Sisters	Leanne Cope; Samantha Raine	Meaghan Grace Hinkis; Beatriz Stix-Brunell
Butler/Executioner	Philip Mosley	Harry Churches

== Videography ==
The 2011 production and 2017 Royal Ballet revival are filmed and released on DVD, both starred Lauren Cuthbertson as the title role.

In light of the impact of the COVID-19 coronavirus pandemic on the performing arts, Royal Danish Ballet released a recording of a performance online, which featured Holly Dorger as Alice.
