= Itziar Mendizabal =

Spanish ballet dancer

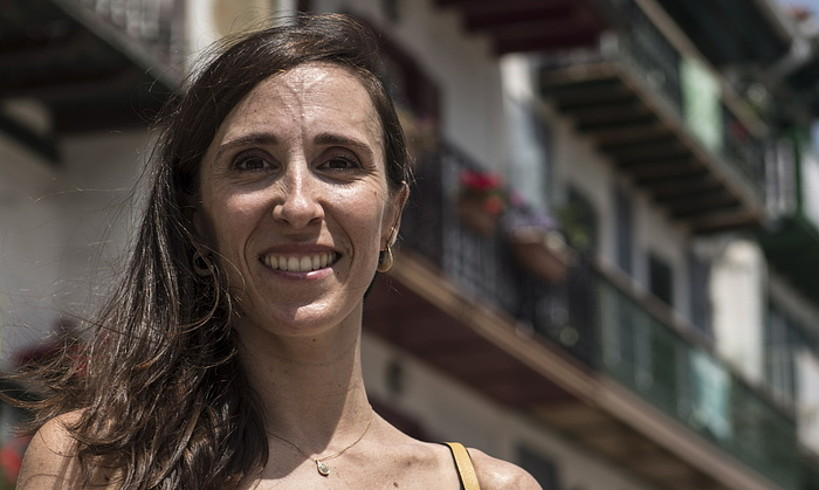
- Mendizabal in 2019
- Born: 14 December 1981 (age 44); Hondarribia, Spain
- Occupation: ballet dancer
- Years active: 1997–present
- Dancing career
- Current group: The Royal Ballet
- Former groups: Víctor Ullate Ballet Comunidad de Madrid; Zürich Ballet; Leipzig Ballet

Itziar Mendizabal (born 14 December 1981) is a Spanish ballet dancer who has performed as a First Soloist with The Royal Ballet since 2010.

== Biography ==
Mendizabal was born in Hondarribia, Basque Country, Spain. She started ballet at age 4, and at age 12, she moved to Madrid to train at Víctor Ullate's Ballet Comunidad de Madrid in 1997. Whilst a student she performed with Ullate's larger ballet company, and later joined the company officially. In 2003, she joined the Zürich Ballet as a demi-soloist. She joined the Leipzig Ballet as a soloist in 2006, and was promoted to principal dancer two years later. In 2009, she received the Best New Artist Award by the Association of Dance Professionals of Guipúzcoa. She was also nominated for the Prix Benois de la Danse for her performance as the title role in The Firebird.

In 2010, after a ballet mistress sent a video clip of Mendizabal to Monica Mason, then-artistic director of The Royal Ballet in London, she was invited to take classes with the company, before being offered a First Soloist contract with the company, which she accepted. Her repertoire there includes works by Kenneth MacMillan, Christopher Wheeldon and Wayne McGregor.

== See also ==
- List of Spanish ballerinas
- List of dancers of The Royal Ballet
