= Nancy Osbaldeston =

English ballet dancer

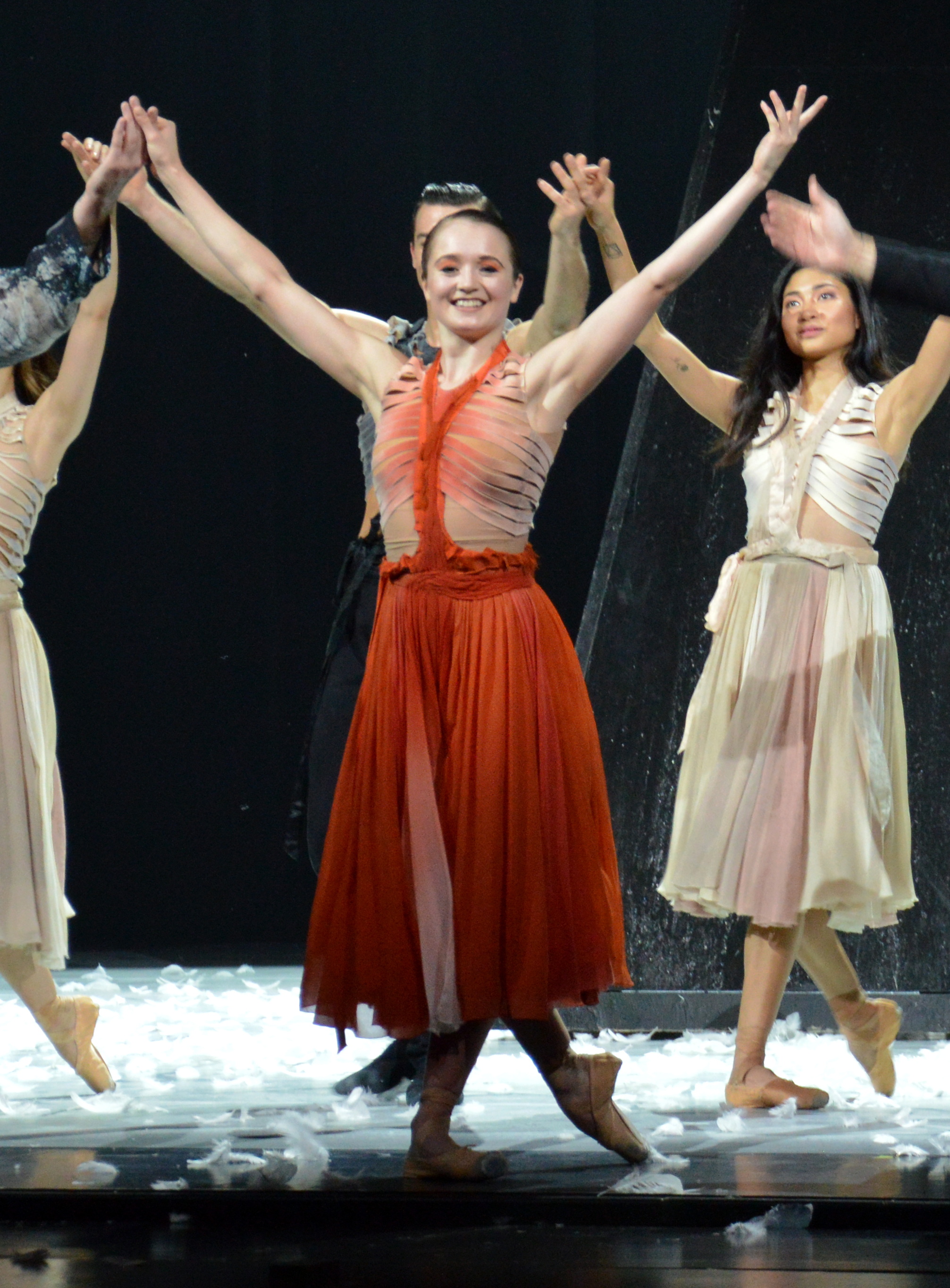
- Nancy Osbaldeston at the curtain call of L'Oiseau de Feu (2017)
- Born: 1989 (age 35–36); Cuckfield, England
- Education: Roshe School, Cardwell Theatre School, English National Ballet School
- Career
- Current group: Royal Ballet of Flanders
- Former groups: English National Ballet

Nancy Osbaldeston (born 1989) is an English ballet dancer who is currently a principal dancer with the Royal Ballet of Flanders. She was formerly first artist at the English National Ballet.

== Biography ==
Osbaldeston was born in 1989 in Cuckfield, England. She started dancing at age 3, and appeared in Birmingham Royal Ballet's The Nutcracker at age 6. She trained at Roshe School, Cardwell Theatre School (from 1996 until 2005) and the English National Ballet School. She later won the third prize of Young British Dancer of the Year. Another of her early performances was as the ballerina doll in the Petrushka duet, which she would perform at competitions.

Osbaldeston joined the English National Ballet as an Artist in 2008. She won the Emerging Dancer Competition in 2013 by dancing an extract from Don Quixote and John Neumeier's Bach Suite no. 2. She was promoted to First Artist the same year. In 2014, she performed in an original English National Ballet production inspired by Vera Brittain’s memoir Testament of Youth, which was choreographed by Stina Quagebeur. Osbaldeston played Vera and Guilherme Menezes performed as the ghost of her fiancé.

At the English National Ballet, Osbaldeston's other performances have included in adaptions of Alice in Wonderland, Angelina Ballerina and Sleeping Beauty, as well as in Coppelia, Les Sylphides, Manon, The Nutcracker, Petrushka, Scheherazade, Strictly Gershwin (at the London Coliseum) and Swan Lake.

In 2014, Osbaldeston moved to Antwerp to join the Royal Ballet of Flanders as a demi-soloist. She was named first soloist in 2016 and principal dancer in 2017. Her repertoire includes works by Sidi Larbi Cherkaoui, Pina Bausch, Akram Khan, William Forsythe, Marcia Haydée, Hans van Manen, Jiří Kylián and John Cranko. She had also performed with the Bavarian State Ballet as a guest, appearing in "Rubies" from George Balanchine's Jewels and as Marie in Neumeier's The Nutcracker.

Osbaldeston is also employed as brand ambassador for So Danca UK & Ireland.
