= Northern Ballet =

English ballet company

General information
- Name: Northern Ballet
- Previous names: Northern Dance Theatre; Northern Ballet Theatre
- Year founded: 1969; 56 years ago
- Founders: Laverne Meyer
- Patron: The Duke of Edinburgh
- Website: northernballet.com

Senior staff
- Executive Director: David Collins

Artistic staff
- Artistic Director: Federico Bonelli

Other
- Orchestra: Northern Ballet Sinfonia
- Associated schools: Academy of Northern Ballet

Northern Ballet, formerly Northern Ballet Theatre, is a dance company based in Leeds, West Yorkshire, England, with a strong repertoire in theatrical dance productions where the emphasis is on story telling as well as classical ballet. The company tours widely across the United Kingdom.

== History ==
Northern Dance Theatre, the name by which the company was originally known, was founded in 1969 by Canadian-born Laverne Meyer; a dramatic dancer whose formative years were spent with Bristol-based, Western Theatre Ballet, the first ever British dance company to be based outside London. The company's first performance was on 28 November 1969 at the University Theatre, Manchester, with the orchestra being supplied by musicians of the Royal Northern College of Music.

In the first six years, the repertory included significant revivals, Kurt Jooss's The Green Table and Andrée Howard's Death and the Maiden, alongside new works by Peter Wright, John Chesworth, Charles Czarny, and Clover Roope. The board of directors began to doubt the experimental focus Meyer had chosen and in 1975, in meeting described as "brutal", Simon Towneley, the board's chairman, invited Meyer to resign immediately.

=== Robert de Warren ===
Robert de Warren was appointed artistic director in 1976. A classically-trained dancer, he had previously worked with the Royal Ballet, as well some of the larger West German ballet companies. He renamed the company Northern Ballet Theatre (NBT) and began to work on full-length classical ballets, rediscovered works and brand new dance-drama creations. During 11 years as artistic director he expanded the company to more than 30 dancers and the orchestra to 25 players under Maestro David Garforth and staged works by such diverse choreographers as August Bournonville, Michael Fokine, Walter Gore, John Cranko, Gillian Lynne and Royston Maldoom. Among other collaborators were composers Carl Davis and Joseph Horovitz and stage designers Clive Lavagna and Philip Prowse, then director of Glasgow's experimental Citizens Theatre.

De Warren's creative drive brought many artistic collaborations to the company including choreographers Andre Prokovsky and Geoffrey Cauley who was given space to experiment on such on-off, site-specific, works as "Paradise Lost" and who made what was for many years the company's signature dance-drama piece, Miss Carter wore Pink, music by Joseph Horovitz, based on the autobiographical books of Helen Bradley, with live narration by actress Patricia Phoenix and designs by Philip Prowse.

De Warren brought Dame Alicia Markova to the company as coach on productions of Les Sylphides and Giselle. He secured Rudolf Nureyev as artistic laureate and guest artist, and Princess Margaret as the company's Royal Patron.

The last of his collaborative works for the company was "A Simple Man", based on the life and paintings of L.S. Lowry: Choreographer Gillian Lynne, Music Carl Davis. The piece brought Northern Ballet's future Artistic Director Christopher Gable to the company to create the role of Lowry. "A Simple Man" remained in the repertoire for a decade and was seen throughout the world in repeated showings of the BBC Television filmed version. De Warren left the company in 1987 to go to the Scala, Milan.

=== Christopher Gable ===
The appointment of Christopher Gable as NBT's third artistic director in 1987 saw the company gain a reputation for imaginative new works and for impressive revivals of old classics.

His appointment owed much to chance. In 1987, for the centenary of the birth of the painter L. S. Lowry, Salford City Council commissioned Gillian Lynne to create a new ballet for the company to celebrate the life and work of the Salford-born artist. At this time the company was still under the artistic direction of Robert de Warren. The work with Lynne and Gable would be the last of his inspired artistic collaborations. Lynne was determined in her choice of dancer for the role of Lowry, enticing ex-Royal Ballet star Christopher Gable back to the dance stage for the first time in more than 20 years.

Gable's appointment as artistic director was popular with the company. He focused as much on the theatre as the ballet in the company's title. With the emphasis on classical dance drama, the success of A Simple Man was followed by full-length productions of Swan Lake, Romeo & Juliet, A Christmas Carol, the Brontes, Don Quixote, Dracula, Giselle and The Hunchback of Notre Dame.

Christopher Gable worked closely with Michael Pink who joined Northern Ballet Theatre as associate artistic director in 1993, where he remained until 1998. His choreographic work for the company included Attractions (1983), Memoire Imaginaire (1987), his first full-length work The Amazing Adventures of Don Quixote (1988), as well as acclaimed ballets such as The Hunchback of Notre Dame, Swan Lake, Giselle, and Dracula.

Throughout his 11 years with NBT, Gable remained artistic director of the Central School of Ballet, which he co-founded with Ann Stannard in London in 1982. The company was located at Spring Hall, Halifax briefly, in 1990. Gable's death in 1998, from cancer at only 58, left the company with a reputation that was gaining steadily on the worldwide dance stage. Northern Ballet Theatre productions had been requested and performed by other companies including Norwegian National Ballet, Atlanta Ballet and the Royal New Zealand Ballet.

=== Stefano Giannetti ===
Stefano Giannetti became fourth Artistic Director after a career including dancing and creating principal roles at English National Ballet and Deutsche Oper Ballet. His first work was an adaptation of Charles Dickens' Great Expectations. However, he was to leave the company after only a year.

=== David Nixon CBE ===
The fifth appointment to the role of Artistic Director was given to former National Ballet of Canada principal dancer David Nixon in August 2001.

In February 2002 he presented his revised version of Madame Butterfly. That was followed by his tribute to the music of George and Ira Gershwin, I Got Rhythm. Nixon's first full-length new work for the company was Wuthering Heights, a collaboration with composer Claude-Michel Schönberg. It premiered at the Bradford Alhambra Theatre in September 2002.

The company followed this original work with a production of Birgit Scherzer's Requiem!! and Nixon's a new production of A Midsummer Night's Dream, which also saw Northern Ballet perform at the West Yorkshire Playhouse for the first time. This was followed by new productions of Swan Lake, Peter Pan, The Three Musketeers, A Sleeping Beauty Tale, The Nutcracker and Hamlet. Autumn 2008 saw the company tour with another new ballet from Cathy Marston telling the classic Dickens story A Tale of Two Cities.

2009 was the company's 40th anniversary; on Monday, 6 September 2010, the company announced that it was changing its name to "Northern Ballet", dropping "theatre" from its title.

In 2011 Northern Ballet premiered two new works - Cléopâtre on 26 February 2011 and Beauty & the Beast on 17 December 2011 both choreographed by David Nixon OBE at Leeds Grand Theatre. In 2012 Ondine was added to the repertoire, originally created by David Nixon for Ballet du Rhin.

2013 also saw the creation of two new full-length ballets; The Great Gatsby and Cinderella. Both productions were choreographed by David Nixon and again received their world premieres at Leeds Grand Theatre.

In 2012 the company started producing ballet's created especially for young children. The first was Ugly Duckling choreographed by Company dancers Dreda Blow and Sebastian Loe. The second, Three Little Pigs choreographed by dancers Hannah Bateman and Victoria Sibson. The third, Elves & the Shoemaker was choreographed by Northern Ballet Ballet Master Daniel de Andrade with an original score by composer Philip Feeney. The three ballets for children have been adapted by the BBC for CBeebies; the adaptations kept the music and dance but also incorporated one of the channel's properties, Mr Bloom, into the production to make them more suitable for a television audience.

During 2013, most of the Channel 4 series Big Ballet was filmed at Northern Ballet.

In 2015 Northern Ballet commissioned Barnsley-born choreographer Jonathan Watkins to create a ballet based on George Orwell's novel Nineteen Eighty-Four. A recording of Nineteen Eighty-Four was commissioned by The Space and BBC. It was broadcast on BBC Four on Sunday 28 February 2016. In June 2016 1984 won the South Bank Sky Arts Award for Dance.

In 2017 Northern Ballet produced three new full-length ballets, one based on the Casanova biography by Ian Kelly, the second based on The Boy in the Striped Pyjamas by John Boyne, and a third based on Hans Christian Andersen's The Little Mermaid.

In 2021 Northern Ballet announced David was stepping down as Artistic Director.

In 2022 David received a CBE for his services to dance.

=== Federico Bonelli ===
Federico Bonelli was announced as Northern Ballet's new artistic director in January 2022 and he officially began on 3 May 2022.

== Rehearsal and performance facility ==
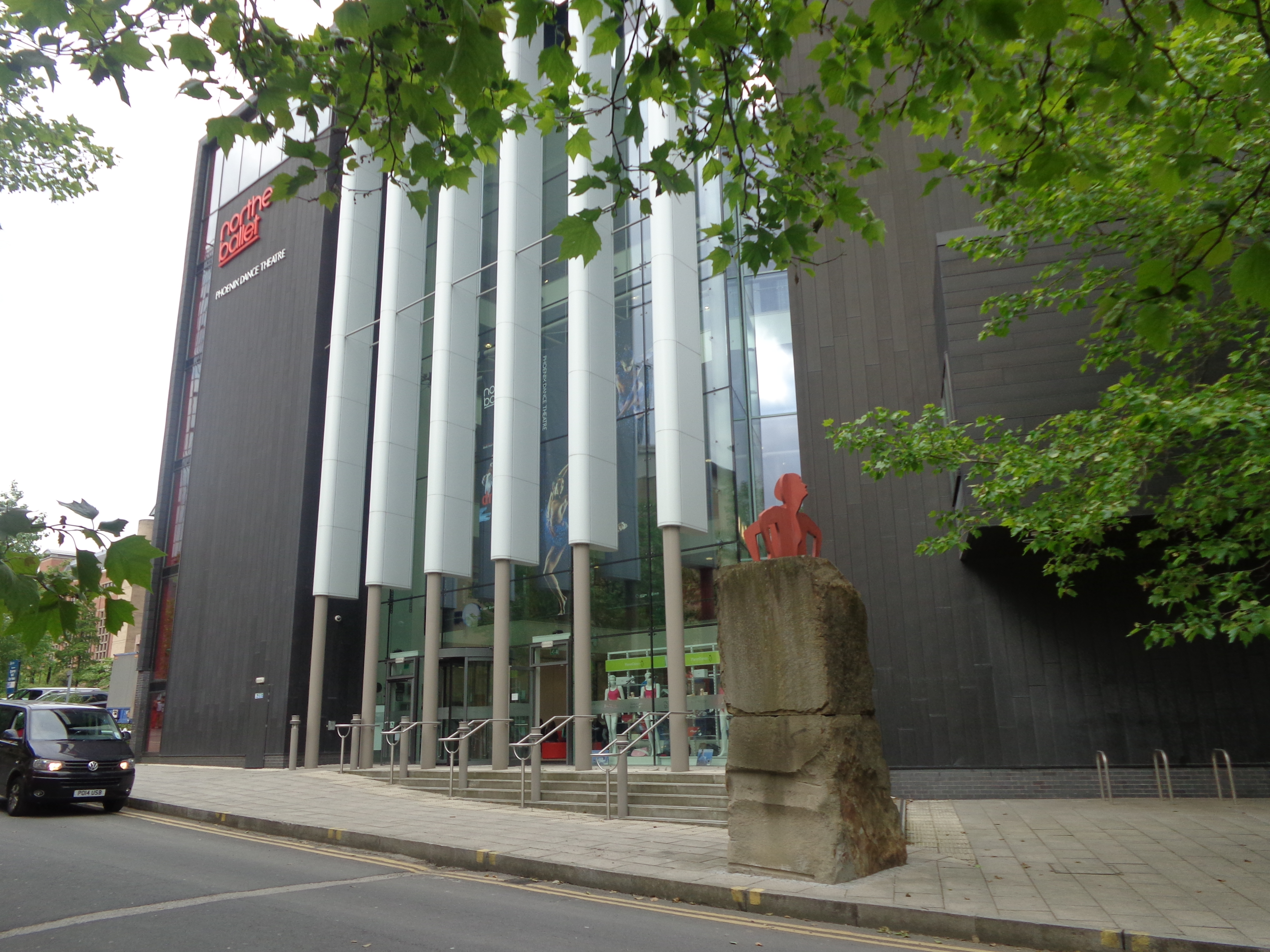
Northern Ballet headquarters, Quarry Hill, Leeds

In autumn 2010 the Northern Ballet moved to a new purpose-built dance and teaching facility in the Quarry Hill district of Leeds. Located in the center of the city adjacent to the Leeds College of Music the building is the largest dedicated space for dance outside London. The building was funded through a public / private partnership between Leeds City Council, a grant from Arts Council England and fundraising by the Northern Ballet.

The building features seven dance studios including a 230-seat studio theatre. Six of the dance studios are installed with specialized harlequin floors. Shared with the contemporary dance company, Phoenix Dance Theatre it is the only facility for dance to house both a national classical and contemporary dance company alongside each another.

== Academy of Northern Ballet ==
Under the direction of ballet mistress Yoko Ichino the academy is housed within the company's Leeds headquarters. The academy offers open classes, an associate program and selective advanced level training for students up to sixteen years of age.

== Artistic staff ==
Name	Role	Nationality
Federico Bonelli	Artistic Director	Italy
Daniel de Andrade	Artistic Associate	Brazil
Christelle Horner	Rehearsal Director	France
Luke Ahmet	Assistant Rehearsal Director	UK
Kenneth Tindall	Choreographer in Residence	UK
Patricia Doyle	Dramatic Associate	UK
Pippa Moore MBE	Artistic Associate	UK
Hikaru Kobayashi	Artistic Advisor	Japan

Northern Ballet staff

== Dancers ==
Name	Position	Nationality	Training	Other companies including guest performances
Amber Lewis	Principal Dancer	Australia	Ecole Studios; The Washington School of Ballet	
Dominique Larose	Principal Dancer	USA	Ayako School of Ballet; Tanz Akademie Zürich; Academy of Northern Ballet	
Jonathan Hanks	Principal Dancer	UK	Royal Ballet School	Estonian National Ballet
Joseph Taylor	Principal Dancer	UK	Janice Sutton Theatre School; Elmhurst Ballet School	
Kevin Poeung	Principal Dancer	France	English National Ballet School	English National Ballet
Saeka Shirai	Principal Dancer	Japan	Yuki Ballet Studio; Royal Winnipeg Ballet School	Royal Winnipeg Ballet; Poznan Opera Ballet
Sarah Chun	Principal Dancer	USA	Faubourg School of Ballet; Joffrey Academy of Dance	Oklahoma City Ballet; Kansas City Ballet
Jackson Dwyer	First Soloist	Canada	Canada's National Ballet School; The John Cranko School in Stuttgart	
Rachael Gillespie	First Soloist	UK	Judith Hockaday School; Central School of Ballet	Scottish Ballet; Ballet Central
Alessandra Bramante	Soloist	Italy	ASDC Dietro le Quinte in Catania; Il Balletto di Castelfranco Veneto; John Cranko School in Stuttgart	
Filippo Di Vilio	Soloist	Italy	Teatro alla Scala Ballet School; English National Ballet School; Academy of Northern Ballet	
Harris Beattie	Soloist	UK	Danscentre in Aberdeen; Central School of Ballet	Ballet Central
Heather Lehan	Soloist	Canada	Canada's National Ballet School	
George Liang	Coryphée	Taiwan	New Zealand School of Dance; Canada's National Ballet School	The National Ballet of Canada
Harriet Marden	Coryphée	UK	Central School of Ballet; Academy of Northern Ballet	
Helen Bogatch	Coryphée	Estonia	Tallinn Ballet School	Estonian National Ballet
Aerys Merrill	Dancer	USA	Richmond Ballet; Alvin Ailey Dance Theatre	
Albert Gonzalez Orts	Dancer	Spain	Estudio de Danza María Carbonell; Academy of Northern Ballet	
Alessia Petrosino	Dancer	Italy	English National Ballet School	Ballet de l’Opéra de Metz
Andrew Tomlinson	Dancer	UK	Academy of Northern Ballet; Canada's National Ballet School	National Ballet of Canada
Antoni Cañellas Artigues	Dancer	Spain	English National Ballet School	National Opera of Bucharest
Archie Sherman	Dancer	UK	Hilton Hall Dance Academy; Royal Ballet School	
Bruno Serraclara	Dancer	Spain	Escola de Dansa Marisa Yudes, Barcelona; Académie Princesse Grace, Monte Carlo	The National Ballet of Canada
Gemma Coutts	Dancer	NZ	Aree School of Dance Arts, Bangkok; English National Ballet School	
Harry Skoupas	Dancer	Greece	Elmhurst Ballet School	Aalto Ballett Theater; Opera Wrocławska
Julie Nunès	Dancer	France	Ecole Nationale Supérieure de Danse de Marseille; Central School of Ballet; Academy of Northern Ballet	
Jun Ishii	Dancer	Japan	State Ballet School Berlin	Staatbellett Berlin
Kaho Masumoto	Dancer	Japan	Kishibe Ballet Studio; English National Ballet School	
Kirica Takahashi	Dancer	Japan	Elmhurst Ballet School; English National Ballet School	
Mayuko Iwanaga	Dancer	Japan	Australian Ballet School; English National Ballet School	
Miguel Teixeira	Dancer	Portugal	Escola de Dança de Ermesinde; Centro de Dança do Porto	
Nida Aydinoğlu	Dancer	Turkey	DEU State Conservatory; John Cranko School	
Noah Benzie-Drayton	Dancer	Australia	Perth School of Ballet; Paris Opera Ballet School	
Sena Kitano	Dancer	Japan	Soda Ballet School; Dutch National Ballet Academy	
Stefano Varalta	Dancer	Italy	Balletto di Verona; Tanz Akademie of Zürich at Zürcher Hochschule der Künste; European School of Ballet	
Yu Wakizuka	Dancer	Japan	Hungarian Dance Academy; San Francisco Ballet School	Houston Ballet
