= Doug Lee =

Doug Lee may refer to:

- Doug Lee (basketball) (born 1964), US basketball player
- Doug Lee (musician) in Mekong Delta (band)

== See also ==
- Doug Lea, professor of computer science
- Douglas Lee (disambiguation)
