= Aaron Robison =

British ballet dancer

- Born: Coventry, England
- Occupation: Ballet dancer

Aaron Robison is a British ballet dancer and currently a Principal Dancer with Houston Ballet. He was previously a Lead principal dancer with English National Ballet and San Francisco Ballet.

== Biography ==
Aaron Robison was born in Coventry, England.

He trained at La Compañia Juvenil de Barcelona and at the Royal Ballet School.

In 2004 he won the Young British Dancer of the Year Award.

A Gold Medal at The Seoul International Dance Competition in South Korea.

A Finalists Cash prize Prix de Lausanne.

In 2012 amongst The Top 100 dancers of the year in Dance Europe.

In 2018 nominated for most outstanding classical performance at the UK Critics circle National Dance Awards.

Dance Europe Critics Choice for Most Outstanding Male performance for William Forsythe's new creation playlist 1,2, Aproximata Sonata 2018 and Arthur Pita's Salome in 2017.

Robison also performed with companies such as English National Ballet, Houston Ballet, Birmingham Royal Ballet, Corella Ballet.

Robison has performed leading roles such as Theseus/Oberon in the American premier of John Neumeier's Midsummers night dream.

Des Greuix in Kenneth MacMillan's L'histoire de Manon.

Romeo in Nureyev's Romeo and Juliet,

Victor in Liam Scarlett's Frankenstein.

Basilio in Tommason’s Don Quixote.

Prince in Neumeiers The Little mermaid

James in Frank Andersen's La sylphide

Petruccio in John Cranko's The Taming of the Shrew

Albrecht in Stanton Welch's Giselle,

Prince Siegfried in Stanton Welch's Swan Lake,

Prince Florimund in Ben Stevenson's and Kenneth MacMillan's The Sleeping Beauty.

The Prince in Peter Wright's, Ben Stevenson's, Helgi Tommason's and Wayne Eagling's The Nutcracker.

Other principal roles in Paquita, principal turning man in Harold Lander's Etudes, Messenger of Death in MacMillan's Song of the Earth, Bernardo in Jerome Robbins West side Story wayne mcgregors Dyad 1929, Jorma Elos One/end/one, Laurent in William Forsthye's In the Middle Somewhat Elevated, approximate sonata. Phlegmatic in George Balanchine's The Four Temperaments, Waltz man in George Balanchine's Serenade, Stravinsky violin concerto aria 1. Jiri Kylian's Wings of Wax, Petit Mort and Svedka. Stanton Welch's Maninyas, Velocity, Blessed of Memory, Clear, Twyla Tharp's The Brahms Hayden, Helgi Tommason's The Fifth Season, Trio. Le Catedral Engloutie.

Robison has created roles in ballets including Danielle Rowe's Unsaid, William Forsthye playlist (track 1,2) Arthur Pita Salome, Yuri Possokhov two United in a single soul, optimistic tragedy, Stanton Welch's Paquita, as well as Aries in Zodiac and Tuba in The Young Person's Guide to the Orchestra, James Kudelka's Passion, Mark Morris The letter V, David Bintley's Take Five and E=MC2, Garry Stewart's The Center and Its Opposite, Michael Corder's Le baiser de la fée.

Robison has toured all over the world and has performed in Galas and guested in Argentina, Spain and Italy. He has performed Del Sole in Napa Valley.

Robison is also a model for So Danca.

His repertoire with Corella Ballet includes: 1st and 3rd movement in Christopher Wheeldon's DGV. Green, Brown and Blue in Four Four. Stomper in Twlyla Tharp's In the Upper Room, Red couple in Clark Tippet's Bruch Violin Concerto, 3rd movement in Clear by Stanton Welch and George Balanchine's Who Cares?. Prince Siegfried in Ángel Corella's Swan Lake, Alli in Le Corsaire, Grand Pas Classique. He was part of a new creation of Palpito by Rojas and Rodriguez which was created especially for the New York City Center.

Repertoire with Birmingham Royal Ballet includes: The Joker in John Cranko's Card Game, Friday night in Kenneth MacMillan's Elite Syncopations, Benvolio in Romeo and Juliet. Other appearances of his include in Hans van Manen's Große Fuge and Twilight. He also played a role of Gypsy lover in Frederick Ashton's The Two Pigeons, Prince in Peter Wright's The Nutcracker, Benno in Swan Lake Bluebird in The Sleeping Beauty, peasant in Giselle, energy in David Bintley's E = mc2, and in Still Life as Brazilian Woolly monkey at the Penguin Café. He also appeared as Petruccio in The Shakespeare Suite, Hobsons Choice (Salvation Army) Take Five (four square), the Orpheus suite, Edward II, Allegro Diverssi, Michel Fokine's Petrushka, The Firebird, ninette de Valois Checkmate (black knight) George Balanchine's Western Symphony, appearing in its 1st movement, Igor Stravinsky's Violin Concerto in Theme and Variations. R Created roles include Garry Stewart's The Center and Its Opposite, Michael Corder's Le baiser de la fée, David Bintley's E=mc2 and Take Five.

== Awards ==
- Young British Dancer of the Year - 2004, 1st Prize
- Seoul International Ballet Competition - 2004, 1st Prize
- Prix de Lausanne - 2004, Encouragement Award

== Created Roles ==
- William Forsthye Playlist track 1,2
- Arthur Pita : Salome
- Yuri Possokhov: Two United In A Single Soul
- Stanton Welch: Paquita (Principal Man) Zodiac (Aries) The Young Person’s Guide To The Orchestra (tuba)
- Dani Rowe: Unsaid
- David Bintley: Take Five
- Garry Stewart: The Center And It’s Opposite
