= David Nixon (choreographer) =

Dance choreographer

David Anthony Nixon CBE is a Canadian dance choreographer.

Born in Chatham, Ontario, Nixon trained at the National Ballet School of Canada and danced with the National Ballet of Canada. He joined the Deutsche Oper Ballet, in Berlin, in 1985 as a principal dancer where he won the Critics Award for Best Male Performance in 1987. Nixon's Liaisons was produced at the Hebbel Theatre in Berlin in 1990.

In 1994, Nixon became Artist Director of BalletMet in Columbus, Ohio, U.S., where he created a version of Bram Stoker's Dracula and an adaptation of the fairy tale "Beauty and the Beast". During his six years with BalletMet, he added sixteen world premieres and fifteen company premieres to their repertoire.

David Nixon became artistic director of Northern Ballet, Leeds, UK in 2001. He premiered multiple works there including new versions of Madame Butterfly, Swan Lake, A Midsummer Night's Dream, Peter Pan and The Three Musketeers. In late February 2011, Cleopatra, choreographed to music by the French composer Claude-Michel Schönberg, was given its world premiere in Leeds. The title role is danced by Martha Leebolt. In late 2011, David Nixon choreographed a new version of Beauty & the Beast.

Nixon choreographed an adaptation of The Great Gatsby which premièred at Grand Theatre, Leeds in March 2013. and a new full-length version of Cinderella to a new score by Philip Feeney which premièred in December 2013.

A perennial production for many ballet companies is his Dracula (1999). Created for BalletMet of Columbus, Ohio while he was artistic director there, it is a visually impressive and highly athletic dance. Eschewing wire work, Nixon uses the bodies of the dancers to express flying with bats, wolfish appetites, etc. Music from various sources, including the Faust Cantata by Alfred Schnittke and sections of Rachmaninoff's Symphonic Dances, are used to highlight the high emotions driving the story. Drawn directly from the Bram Stoker novel Dracula, Nixon's ballet includes vivid imaginings of the blood transfusions given desperately to Dracula's victim Lucy and scenes in the insane asylum with frenetic dancing by the characters of Dr. Seward and Renfield. The original Dracula, Jimmy Orrante, and Nixon created a Count Dracula full of contradictions with more human longings than the Stoker character. Often performed separately for dance exhibitions and competitions, a pas de deux between Dracula and Mina draws the two into an equal partnership, including moves with the ballerina supporting the male lead. The ballet concludes in a vigorous set of sequences done to Red Cape Tango from the Metropolis symphony by Michael Daugherty.

A new version of David Nixon's Dracula was created for Northern Ballet Theatre in Leeds for 2005.

David Nixon has been a guest artist at the Bayerisches Staatsballett in Munich, Royal Winnipeg Ballet, Birmingham Royal Ballet, Komische Oper, Deutsche Staatsoper, Hamburg Ballet, and Sydney City Ballet. He was voted Director of the Year 2003 and 2006 by readers of Dance Europe magazine, and he is the only director to win the award twice. The Northern Ballet Theatre won the Audience Award in the 2004, 2005, and 2006 National Dance Awards, becoming the first company to win the award in consecutive years.

In 2017 Northern Ballet premiered his ballet The Little Mermaid, based on the story by Hans Andersen.

== Accolades ==
Nixon was appointed Officer of the Order of the British Empire (OBE) in the 2010 New Year Honours and Commander of the Order of the British Empire (CBE) in the 2022 Birthday Honours for services to dance.

In 2024 he was inducted into the Chatham-Kent Cultural Hall of Fame in its 'Dance' category in recognition of his contributions as a ballet dancer, choreographer and artistic director.
