= Pippa Moore =

English ballet dancer

Pippa Moore MBE
- Born: Samantha Pippa Moore; 1973 or 1974 (age 51–52); Liverpool, England
- Education: The Hammond School; Royal Ballet Upper School
- Occupation: ballet dancer
- Height: 5 ft 1 in (155 cm)
- Career
- Current group: Northern Ballet

Samantha Pippa Moore MBE (born 1973 or 1974) is an English ballet dancer. She joined the Northern Ballet in 1996, was promoted to premier dancer in 2009 and retired in 2019. She now works as artistic and learning assistant with the Northern Ballet.

== Early life and training ==
Moore was born in Liverpool. She first studied dance at Elliott-Clarke School of Dance, where her mother worked next door. Moore initially trained in various dance styles, including ballet, modern dance and tap. She later attended the Hammond School and the Royal Ballet Upper School, and took classes with Northern Ballet during school holidays.

== Career ==
Moore first auditioned for the Leeds-based Northern Ballet when she was eighteen. However, director Christopher Gable rejected her due to her lack of experience. Then, she danced with smaller touring troupe Wiener Ballet, which performed at different locations every night. In 1996, she auditioned for Northern Ballet again, and was hired for three months to substitute an injured dancer on tour. She learned three ballets three weeks before the tour started. She remained in the company after the tour. Her first breakthrough was as Lucy in the third cast of Gable's Dracula. In 2004, she was nominated for outstanding female artist (classical) at the National Dance Awards. She rose through the ranks and in 2009, she was promoted to premier dancer. She had created roles in various new ballets. She is 5 feet 1 inch (1.55 m) tall, which is short for ballet dancers, so she was often cast as children or young characters.

In 2019, Moore retired from performing. Her last role was as Older Princess Beatrice, Queen Victoria's youngest daughter, in Cathy Marston's new ballet Victoria. Coincidentally, she was 44, the same age as her character at the start of the ballet. She remains in the Northern Ballet as an artistic and learning assistant, and also works for Academy of Northern Ballet. Moore was appointed a Member of the Order of the British Empire (MBE) in the 2021 Birthday Honours for services to dance.
