= Federico Bonelli =

Italian ballet dancer

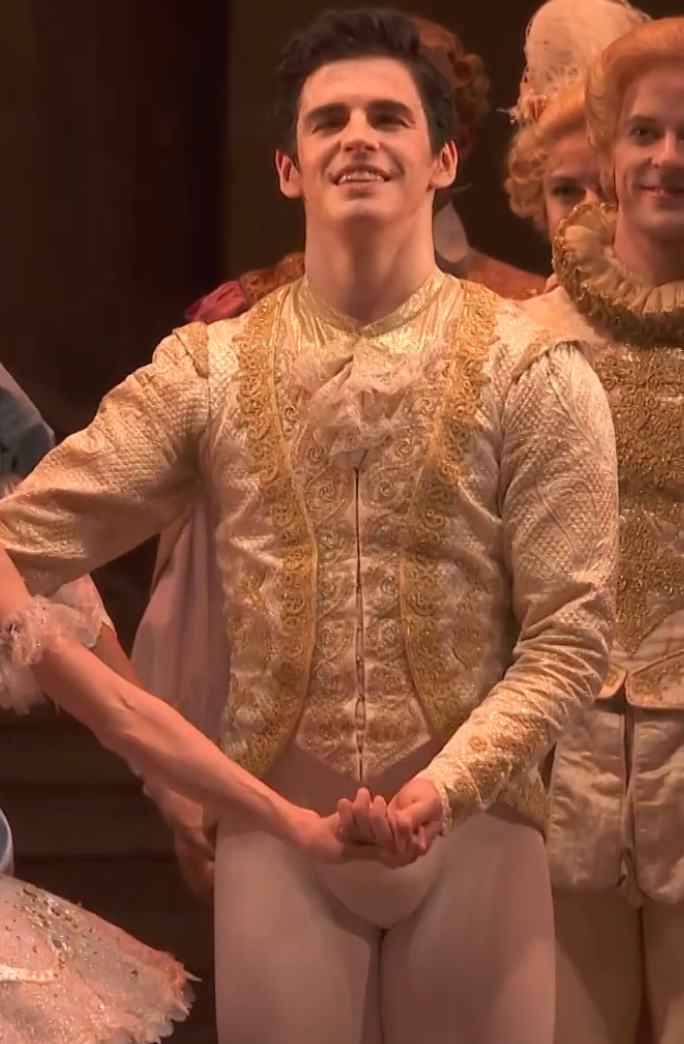
- Bonelli in The Sleeping Beauty
- Born: 1978 (age 47–48); Genoa
- Education: Turin Dancer Academy
- Occupation: ballet dancer
- Years active: 1996–2022
- Spouse: Hikaru Kobayashi
- Career
- Current group: Northern Ballet
- Former groups: Dutch National Ballet, Zurich Ballet, The Royal Ballet

Federico Bonelli (born 1978 in Genoa) is an Italian ballet dancer and was a principal dancer with the Royal Ballet in London, England. He became the artistic director of Northern Ballet in May 2022.

== Biography ==
Federico Bonelli was born in Genoa, Italy. He trained in classical ballet at the Turin Dance Academy before graduating into the Zurich Ballet, at the Zurich Opera House in Zürich, Switzerland. After three years in Zurich, Bonelli joined Dutch National Ballet based in Amsterdam, Netherlands. In September 2003, Bonelli became a principal dancer of the Royal Ballet.

In 2013 he danced Romeo in Romeo and Juliet.

In 2018, Bonelli was awarded a place on the Clore Leadership Program.

He danced in Frankenstein at The Royal Ballet in Spring 2019.

In December 2019, Bonelli performed the role of The Prince in The Royal Ballet's production of The Nutcracker. The performance was screened live to cinemas in the UK.

Bonelli became the artistic director of Northern Ballet on 1 May 2022.

== Personal life ==
He is married to Royal Ballet former First Soloist Hikaru Kobayashi and they have a daughter.
