= Douglas Lee (choreographer) =

British choreographer (born 1977)

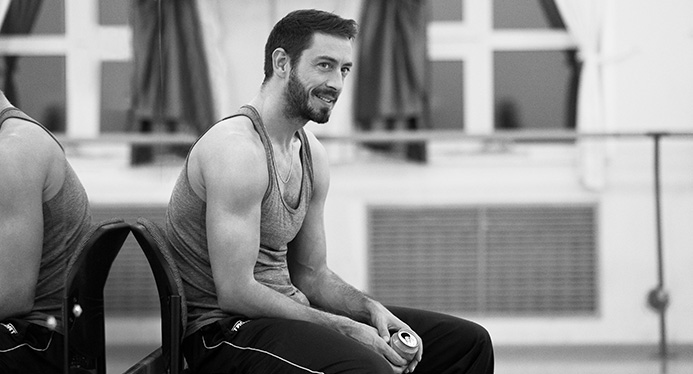
Choreographer Douglas Lee in rehearsal

Douglas Lee (born 1977 in London, England) is a British choreographer. A former principal dancer with the Stuttgart Ballet, his ballets have been premiered by Stuttgart Ballet, Norwegian National Ballet, New York City Ballet, Netherlands Dance Theatre, and several other European ballet companies.

== Life and career ==
Born in London, Douglas Lee started his ballet training at the Arts Educational Schools, London and then received a scholarship for the Royal Ballet School, where he graduated in 1996, winning the Alicia Markova Award.

Douglas Lee then joined The Stuttgart Ballet, his promotion to Principal Dancer followed in 2002. As a principal dancer, Lee danced many roles for choreographers such as John Cranko, Jiri Kylian, John Neumeier, Hans van Manen, Glen Tetley, George Balanchine and William Forsythe.

Douglas Lee made his choreographic debut in February 1999 for the Stuttgart-based Noverre Society's 'Young Choreographers', after which he was commissioned to create a new work for the Stuttgart Ballet. He also participated twice at the New York Choreographic Institute to work with dancers of The New York City Ballet.

With Aubade and Lachrymal, Lee presented his first works for the Stuttgart Opera House, new creations for the Stuttgart Ballet also included Viewing Room, Dummy Run and Leviathan. His tenth work for the Stuttgart Ballet, Miniatures set to the music of Dutch composer Simeon ten Holt premiered in March 2011. Following his choreographic success in Stuttgart, he became a freelance choreographer working internationally.

Lee's creation Fanfare LX for the Stuttgart Ballet was taken into the repertoire of the Staatsballett Berlin. He created Fractured Wake and returned to create 5 for Silver for the Norwegian National Ballet, Rubicon Play for the Royal Ballet of Flanders and Lifecasting set to the music of Steve Reich for the New York City Ballet, which was shortlisted in Time Out NY as one of the outstanding dance works of 2009 and taken into the Stuttgart Ballet repertoire.

As well as returning to the Stuttgart Ballet to create Aria and Arcadia he has created pieces for Tulsa Ballet, Ballett Augsburg, Ballett Mainz, Ballet de l'Opéra national du Rhin, Yacobson Ballet, Croatian National Theater Rijeka, Atlanta Ballet and the Greek National Ballet. His work is often celebrated for its dark, minimalist beauty.

In 2016 Lee's creation Snow Was Falling for Perm Opera and Ballet Theatre set to the music of Bernard Herrmann received the Golden Mask Award for best choreographer. He also created Legion for Netherlands Dance Theatre 2, Earthlings for Les Grands Ballets Canadiens de Montreal and three new works for Ballett Zürich which included a newly commissioned score for Lady with a Fan by New York-based composer Michael Gordon. Recent creations include a new Petrushka with the music of Igor Stravinsky for Ballett Nürnberg, Naiad for the Stuttgart Ballet, Puppet for Czech National Ballet with a score by Third Coast Percussion, his third creation for Ballett Dortmund Maquette and the critically acclaimed Playdead for Ballett Theater Nordhausen.

== Choreographic work ==
- 2025 Lotus-Eaters, Tiroler Landestheater
- 2025 La Mer, Ballet Lodz
- 2025 Gatefall, Ballett Kiel
- 2024 Callisto, Klaipeda Music Theatre
- 2024 Automata, Ballett Augsburg
- 2024 Trancing, Delattre Dance Company
- 2023 Troupe, NRW Juniorballett
- 2022 Playdead, Ballett Theater Nordhausen
- 2022 Maquette, Ballett Dormund
- 2021 Puppet, Czech National Ballet
- 2021 Sonata Pathétique, Croatian National Theater Rijeka
- 2020 Naiad, Stuttgart Ballet
- 2019 Petrushka, Ballett Nürnberg
- 2019 Earthlings, Les Grands Ballets de Montréal
- 2019 She Wore Red, Ballett Dortmund
- 2018 Firebird, Yacobson Ballet St. Petersburg
- 2017 Lady With A Fan, Ballett Zürich
- 2017 Fortress, Greek National Orchestra Ballet Athens
- 2016 Playground, Atlanta Ballet
- 2015 Snow Was Falling, Perm Ballet
- 2015 Ophelia, Ballet de l'Opéra national du Rhin
- 2014 The Fade, Ballett Mainz
- 2014 Doll Songs, Ballett Nürnberg
- 2014 A-Life, Ballett Zürich
- 2013 PianoPiece, Ballett Dortmund
- 2012 Septet, Tulsa Ballet
- 2012 Legion, Netherlands Dance Theatre II
- 2012 Iris, Ballett Zürich
- 2012 Chimera, Ballett Augsburg
- 2012 Aria, Stuttgart Ballet
- 2011 Souvenir, Perm Opera Ballet Theatre
- 2011 Miniatures, Stuttgart Ballet
- 2011 5 For Silver, Norwegian National Ballet
- 2010 Nightlight, Stuttgart Ballet
- 2009 Lifecasting, New York City Ballet
- 2009 Fanfare LX, Stuttgart Ballet
- 2008 Leviathan, Stuttgart Ballet
- 2007 Dummy Run, Stuttgart Ballet
- 2006 Viewing Room, Stuttgart Ballet
- 2006 Rubicon Play, Royal Ballet of Flanders
- 2005 Fractured Wake, Norwegian National Ballet
- 2004 Lachrymal, Stuttgart Ballet
- 2003 Aubade, Stuttgart Ballet
