= Bayerisches Staatsballett =

German ballet company

General information
- Name: Bayerisches Staatsballett
- Year founded: 1988
- Founder: Konstanze Vernon
- Location: Munich, Germany
- Website: www.staatsoper.de/staatsballett.html

Senior staff
- Director: Laurent Hilaire

The Bavarian State Ballet (German: Bayerisches Staatsballett) is a professional ballet company in Munich, Germany. It was founded in 1988 by Konstanze Vernon as an independent company. The ballet had previously been part of the Bayerische Staatsoper. In a broader sense, Bavarian State Ballet is sometimes used for the Bavarian State Opera Ballet before 1988. Vernon was the director of the independent company for the first 10 years, succeeded by Ivan Liška. From 2016 to 2022, Igor Zelensky was director of the ballet. In 2022, Laurent Hilaire took over the ballet. The company is formed by international dancers and has a repertory of more than 80 works from Romantic ballet to the 21st century. It is considered as a leading company in Europe.

== Ensemble 2025/2026 ==
=== Principal dancers ===
Name	Nationality	Training	Other companies (inc. guest performances)
Yonah Acosta	Cuba	Cuban National Ballet School	Cuban National Ballet English National Ballet
Maria Baranova	FinlandUkraine	Helsinki Dance Institute Hamburg Ballet School	Hamburg Ballet Finnish National Ballet Boston Ballet
Jakob Feyferlik	Austria	Vienna Conservatory Vienna State Opera Ballet School	Vienna State Ballet Dutch National Ballet
Osiel Gouneo	Cuba	Cuban National Ballet School	Cuban National Ballet Norwegian National Ballet Paris Opera Ballet
Violetta Keller	Germany	Munich Conservatory Ballet Academy	Finnish National Ballet
Julian MacKay	United States	American Ballet Theatre Royal Ballet School Académie de Danse Princesse Grace, Monaco Bolshoi Ballet Academy	Bolshoi Ballet The Royal Ballet Mikhailovsky Ballet San Francisco Ballet
Ksenia Shevtsova	Russia	Vaganova Academy of Russian Ballet	Stanislavski and Nemirovich-Danchenko Theatre
Laurretta Summerscales	United Kingdom	English National Ballet School	English National Ballet
Elisabeth Tonev	Spain Bulgaria Germany	Berlin State Ballet School	Berlin State Ballet Dutch National Ballet
Jinhao Zhang	China	English National Ballet School Tongji University	English National Ballet

=== Soloists ===
- Carolina Bastos
- Clark Eselgroth
- Zhanna Gubanova
- Elvina Ibraimova
- Ariel Merkuri

=== Demi-Soloists ===
- Lizi Avsajanishvili
- Maria Chiara Bono
- Severin Brunhuber
- Matteo Dilaghi
- Rhiannon Fairless
- Ana Gonçalves
- Yago Gonzaga
- Margarita Grechanaia
- Konstantin Ivkin
- Jeanette Kakareka
- Zachary Rogers
- Soren Sakadales
- Phoebe Schembri
- Robin Strona

=== Corps de Ballet ===
- Łukasz Bałoniak
- Tommaso Beneventi
- Polina Bualova
- Alexey Dobikov
- Madeleine Dowdney
- Finn Falconer
- Dani Gibson
- Noah Hak
- Jasmine Henry
- Aurélien Hoguet
- Oscar Kempsey-Fagg
- Zarek King
- Nikita Kirbitov
- Mariia Malinina
- Pablo Martínez
- Marina Mata Gómez
- Polina Medvedeva
- Elisa Mestres
- Jasper Metcalfe
- Mikaela Milić
- Laura Orsi
- Capucine Perrot
- Viktor Shinichiro Prokofiev
- Lulu Rose
- Florian Ulrich Sollfrank
- Frederick Stuckwisch
- Chelsea Thronson
- Anastasiia Uzhanskaia
- Daniella Venter
- Chiara Vitali
- Margaret Whyte
- Sabrina Yap

=== Character dancers ===
- Zoltan Mano Beke
- Séverine Ferrolier
- Norbert Graf
- Stefan Moser
