= Delia Mathews =

New Zealand ballet dancer

- Born: 1990 (age 35–36); Rotorua, New Zealand
- Education: Royal Ballet School
- Occupation: Ballet dancer
- Years active: 2008-2020
- Spouse: Josh Harris
- Children: 1
- Dancing career
- Former groups: Birmingham Royal Ballet

Delia Mathews (born 1990) is a New Zealand ballet dancer. She was a principal dancer at the Birmingham Royal Ballet.

== Life ==
Mathews was born in Rotorua, New Zealand, and began ballet lessons with her sister in Tauranga at the age of 5. When she was 15, she was accepted into the Royal Ballet School in London, and studied there for three years. On graduating, Mathews received the Dame Ninette de Valois Award for Most Outstanding Graduate. In 2008 she joined the Birmingham Royal Ballet and became a principal dancer in 2017.

In 2020, she left the company in order to return to New Zealand and raise her first child.

Delia and her husband, a British civil engineer, now run an off-grid hotel retreat they built near Tauranga.
