= James Hay =

James Hay may refer to:

- James Hay (bishop) (died 1538), Scottish abbot and bishop
- James Hay, 7th Lord Hay of Yester (1564–1609), Scottish landowner and courtier
- James Hay, 1st Earl of Carlisle (c.1580–1636), British noble
- James Hay, 2nd Earl of Carlisle (1612–1660), British noble
- James Hay, 15th Earl of Erroll (1726–1778), Scottish nobleman
- James Hay, Lord Hay (1797–1815), British noble and soldier
- James Hay (British Army officer) (died 1854), British Army officer of the Napoleonic Era
- James Hay (cricketer) (1886-1936), New Zealand cricketer
- James Hay (entrepreneur) (born 1950), Scottish born entrepreneur, chairman of JMH Group
- James Hay (footballer) (1876–1940), footballer for Barnsley, Chesterfield Town and Stoke
- James Hay (philanthropist) (1888–1971), New Zealand businessman, local politician and philanthropist
- James Hay (politician) (1856–1931), U.S. Representative from Virginia
- James Hay (singer) (1885–1958), Australian tenor in Gilbert and Sullivan operas
- James Hay Partnership, a British financial services company
- Jim Hay (1931–2018), ice hockey player
- Jim Hay (rugby union), Scottish rugby union player
- Jimmy Hay (1881–1940), Scottish football player
- Sir James Shaw Hay (1839–1924), Governor of Gambia, Sierra Leone and the Bahamas
- James Hay (dancer), soloist in the Royal Ballet

== See also ==
- James Hayes (disambiguation)
