= Yasmine Naghdi =

British ballet dancer

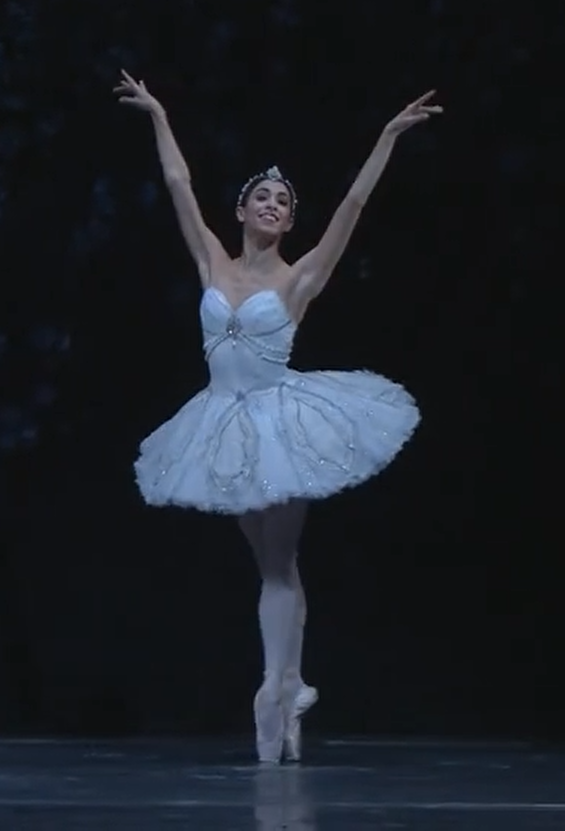
- Yasmine in La Bayàdere (production of Natalia Makarova)
- Born: 25 March 1992 (age 34); London, England
- Occupation: Principal ballerina at The Royal Ballet
- Spouse: Riccardo Ghezzi (m. 2023)

Yasmine Naghdi (born 25 March 1992) is a British ballerina and a principal ballerina of The Royal Ballet, London. She joined The Royal Ballet's corps de ballet in April 2010 while she was a graduate student at The Royal Ballet School. She made her way up through all the five ranks of The Royal Ballet and reached the highest rank aged 24, when she was promoted to principal ballerina.

== Early life and training ==
Nagdhi was born to an Iranian Zoroastrian father and a Belgian mother. She also has some Georgian heritage on her father's side. Naghdi grew up in Kensington and attended Hill House School. At age 7, she joined the West London School of Dance and took after-school classes at the Marie Rambert Studio in Notting Hill.

Naghdi started her vocational training at The Royal Ballet School in 2004. She was a Royal Ballet School junior associate before joining The Royal Ballet School at White Lodge. As a student, she worked with The Royal Ballet company and first appeared on the Royal Opera House stage, aged 11, in Cinderella, aged 12 in Swan Lake, and later on in Sleeping Beauty and The Nutcracker. In September 2008 Yasmine Naghdi progressed into The Royal Ballet School's Senior Section/Upper School; in March 2009 she was awarded first prize in the "Young British Dancer of the Year" competition.

== Career ==
Naghdi joined The Royal Ballet in April 2010 and was promoted to the rank of first artist by the end of 2011–2012 season. She was made soloist (ballet) at the end of the 2013–2014 season, first soloist at the end of the 2015–2016 season and by the end of the 2016–2017 season she was promoted to The Royal Ballet's highest rank and became a principal ballerina aged 24.

At the age of 22, she danced her debut as Juliet in Romeo and Juliet; The Royal Ballet was celebrating 50 years since Sir Kenneth MacMillan's Romeo and Juliet premiered at the Royal Opera House in 1965. She danced her debut as Odette/Odile in Swan Lake aged 24.

== Repertory ==
Naghdi's major leading roles with the Company include Odette/Odile (Swan Lake), Princess Aurora (The Sleeping Beauty), Juliet (Romeo and Juliet), Tatiana (Onegin), Giselle, Cinderella, Kitri (Don Quixote), Gamzatti (La Bayadère), Swanilda (Coppélia), Baroness Mary Vetsera (Mayerling), Countess Marie Larish (Mayerling), Sugar Plum Fairy (The Nutcracker), Firebird (The Firebird), Mathilde Kschessinska (Anastasia), Tita (Like Water for Chocolate), Irina (Winter Dreams), Terpsichore (Apollo), Young Girl (The Two Pigeons), Stop Time Rag and Bethena/Concert Waltz (Elite Syncopations), and Pink Girl (Dances at a Gathering). Her further repertory includes Concerto, Within the Golden Hour (central pas de deux), Symphonic Variations, Scènes de ballet, Balanchine's Jewels, Tarantella, The Four Temperaments, Symphony in C, Theme and Variations, Ballo della Regina, Ballet Imperial, and Serenade; Le Corsaire, La Valse, Sylvia, Le Parc (Angelin Preljocaj), Three Preludes (Ben Stevenson) and various works by Wayne McGregor and Christopher Wheeldon. She created a role in Zucchetti's Prima.

== Personal life ==
In September 2023, Yasmine Naghdi married Italian financier Riccardo Ghezzi. Their wedding took place on a private estate in Tuscany, Italy Together they have a son, born in London, on 4 December 2025.

== Honours ==
- First prize "Classical Excellence", The Royal Ballet School
- "Most Outstanding Classical Dancer" award, 2007
- First prize "Kenneth Macmillan Choreographic Competition", The Royal Ballet School.
- First prize Young British Dancer of the Year, 2009.
- Nominated "Best Female Dancer" at the National Critics Dance Awards, 2018
