= Hikaru Kobayashi =

Japanese ballet dancer

Hikaru Kobayashi 小林ひかる
- Born: 19 September 1976 (age 49); Tokyo, Japan
- Education: Paris Opera Ballet School
- Occupation: ballet dancer
- Years active: 1995-2018
- Spouse: Federico Bonelli
- Children: 1
- Career
- Former groups: Jeune Ballet de France; Zürich Ballet; Dutch National Ballet; The Royal Ballet

Hikaru Kobayashi (小林ひかる, born 19 September 1976) is a Japanese ballet dancer who was a first soloist with The Royal Ballet in London.

== Biography ==
Born in Tokyo, she started ballet at age three after seeing Swan Lake on television. At age 15, she decided to apply to the Paris Opera Ballet School, though she was told the school did not accept foreigners. She got the contact informations from the French embassy. She was accepted, making her the first Japanese student there, though she discovered there were other foreign students.

After she graduated in 1995, as the Paris Opera Ballet did not accept foreigners at the time, she danced with Jeune Ballet de France for a year, then moved to Zürich Ballet. She won the first prize at the International Competition of Vignale Danza in 1998. In 1999, she joined the Dutch National Ballet in Amsterdam. Following artistic director Wayne Eagling's departure, she auditioned for The Royal Ballet in London. She was offered a First Artist contract and joined the company in 2003. She was made Soloist in 2006 and First Soloist in 2009. She performed several lead roles with the Royal Ballet. She had also performed with other companies as a guest artist. In 2018, Kobayashi retired from The Royal Ballet after 15 years in the company. Her last role was Countess Marie Larisch in Mayerling.

Kobayashi is married to Federico Bonelli, a principal dancer at The Royal Ballet, whom she met in Zürich. They have a daughter.

== Selected repertoire ==
- Princess Aurora and Bluebird pas de deux in The Sleeping Beauty
- Nikiya and Gamzatti in La Bayadère
- Countess Marie Larisch in Mayerling
- Myrtha and pas de six in Giselle
- Fairy Summer in Cinderella
- Ballo della regina
- Birthday Offering
- Symphony in C
- La Valse
- Concerto
- In the Night
