= Philip Mosley =

British ballet dancer

- Born: Barnsley, South Yorkshire, England
- Occupations: Ballet dancer, arts administrator
- Years active: 1986–present
- Employer: The Royal Ballet
- Known for: Character Artist at The Royal Ballet; inspiration for Billy Elliot

Philip Mosley is an English ballet dancer and arts administrator at The Royal Ballet. He joined the company in 1986 and has continued to perform as a Character Artist alongside administrative roles, including Artistic Scheduling Manager. Mosley has been described in multiple publications as one of the real-life inspirations who informed screenwriter Lee Hall while developing the story for the 2000 film Billy Elliot.

== Early life and training ==
Mosley was born in Barnsley, South Yorkshire. He began dance classes as a child in Barnsley, training with teacher Rosalind Wicks. Mosley later trained at The Royal Ballet School (White Lodge, Richmond Park).

== Career ==
=== Performance ===
Mosley joined The Royal Ballet in 1986 and was promoted to First Artist in 1993. As a Character Artist, he has performed roles including Widow Simone in La Fille mal gardée, Sancho Panza in Don Quixote, and Friar Laurence in Romeo and Juliet.

Reviews of La Fille mal gardée at the Royal Opera House have specifically noted Mosley's portrayal of Widow Simone, including his execution of the clog dance.

=== Administration ===
Alongside performing, Mosley moved into artistic administration: Artistic Co-ordinator (2001), Artistic Administrator (2007) and Artistic Scheduling Manager (2014).

== Billy Elliot inspiration ==
Coverage around the release and success of Billy Elliot identified Mosley as a real-life reference point for the film's depiction of a boy from a mining community pursuing ballet training. In a 2001 The New York Times feature, Mosley is introduced in Washington, D.C. as "the real Billy Elliot", while the article also reports that Hall described Mosley as an important influence whose life details paralleled the story (and notes the character drew on multiple sources).

== Selected repertoire ==
- Widow Simone in La Fille mal gardée
- Sancho Panza in Don Quixote
- Friar Laurence in Romeo and Juliet
- Ugly Sister in Cinderella
