= Alfreda Thorogood =

- Born: 17 August 1942; Lambeth, London, England
- Occupations: Ballet dancer; Ballet teacher
- Spouse: David Wall (m. 1967; died 2013)
- Children: 2

Alfreda Thorogood (born 17 August 1942) is an English retired ballet dancer and teacher. She joined the touring company of the The Royal Ballet in 1960 and danced on tour until she was promoted to a soloist in 1965, then became principal dancer in 1968 and resident dancer in 1970. Thorogood left The Royal Ballet in 1980. She taught at the Bush Davies School of Theatre Arts, was an artistic adviser to the Royal Academy of Dance, artistic director of dance at Elmhurst Ballet School and was governor of the English National Ballet School.

== Early life ==
Thorogood was born in Lambeth, London, England on 17 August 1942. She is the daughter of Alfreda (née Langham) and Edward Thorogood, and had a sister Pat, who was also a ballet dancer. Thorogood was educated at Lady Eden School and then at the Junior and Senior Royal Ballet School, training under Margot Fonteyn, Volkova Goncharov and Nancy Robinson. She graduated when she was 17.

== Career ==
She joined the touring company of the The Royal Ballet in 1960, and danced on tour in Swan Lake, The Sleeping Beauty, and Frederick Ashton's The Two Pigeons. Thorogood was promoted to the role of a soloist in August 1965, and was in The Rake's Progress, in Antony Tudor's Knight Errant in 1968, Geoffrey Cauley's In the Beginning in 1969, Caluey's Symphonie pastorale, Frederick Ashton's The Creatures of Promethus, Mary Vetsera and Countess Marie Larische in Kenneth MacMillan’s Mayerling, and the title role of Giselle in 1970. She became principal dancer in 1968 and was made resident dancer in 1970, performing numerous principal female roles, including Swanilda in Coppélia and Aurora, to critical acclaim.

In 1974, Thorogood danced the role of Princess Aurora in the production of The Sleeping Beauty, and the Jerome Robbins ballet In the Night. In February 1975, she left The Royal Ballet and stopped her career in dancing to look after her family. Thorogood was a guest on Nana Mouskouri's second BBC2 show in January 1976. She returned to dance and performed as the leading female role in Glen Tetley's ballet Voluntaries in 1977. Thorogood went on to dance in the Moving Picture Mime Show in February 1978, and in Igor Stravinsky's The Firebird in 1979. She was partnered with such dancers as David Wall, Rudolf Nureyev, Anthony Dowell, Wayne Eagling and Stephen Jefferies, Donald MacLeary and Christopher Gable throughout her career, before leaving The Royal Ballet in 1980.

Thorogood worked as a teacher at the Bush Davies School of Theatre Arts from 1982 to 1984 and was deputy principal of the school's ballet department between 1985 and 1989. She was the director from 1988 to 1989. Thorogood was an artistic adviser to the Royal Academy of Dance between 1989 and 1992 and then was artistic director of dance at Elmhurst Ballet School from 1994, having been its senior ballet teacher between 1992 and 1994. She was guest repetiteur at the English National Ballet Company from 2006 to 2012 and started as governor at the English National Ballet School in 2012. Thorogood is a member of the Advisory Panel for Dance for the Arts Council and received a Fellowship from the Royal Academy of Dance in 2015.

== Personal life ==
She got engaged to the ballet dancer David Wall in October 1966, and were married at St Martin-in-the-Fields, London on 1 August 1967. There were two children of the marriage; Wall died in 2013.
