= Anna Rose O'Sullivan =

English ballet dancer

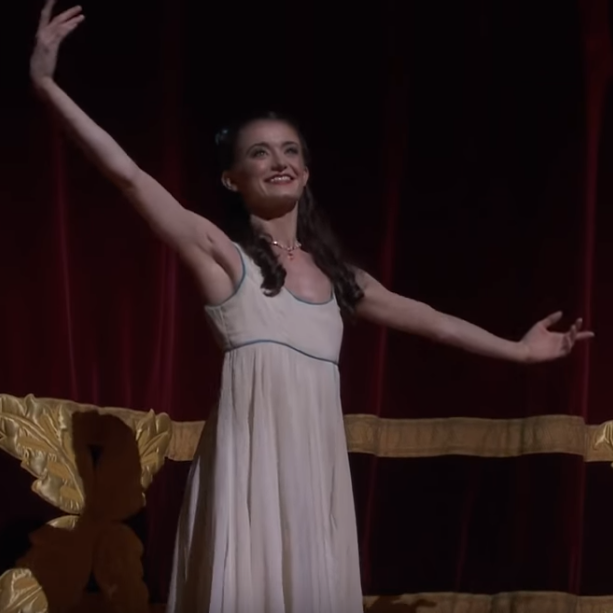
- as Clara in The Nutcracker (2018)
- Born: 16 April 1994 (age 32); Harrow, London, England
- Education: Royal Ballet School
- Occupation: Ballet dancer
- Dancing career
- Current group: The Royal Ballet

Anna Rose O'Sullivan (born 16 April 1994) is an English ballet dancer and is a principal dancer at the Royal Ballet. Her promotion to principal dancer took effect in September 2021.

== Early life ==
O'Sullivan was born in Harrow, London and raised in Ickenham. Her father is a construction contracts manager and her mother works in the NHS. She has two younger brothers and a younger sister. She started dance at age two, and performed with London Children's Ballet. She has also performed in musical theatre, and appeared as Cosette in Les Misérables and in Chitty Chitty Bang Bang on the West End. She entered The Royal Ballet School at age 11.

== Career ==
O'Sullivan graduated into The Royal Ballet in 2012. In 2015, she danced her first major role, Clara in The Nutcracker. Her performance was endorsed by Peter Wright, the production's choreographer. She was named First Artist in 2016, Soloist in 2017, First Soloist in 2019, and Principal in 2021. Her first principal role was Alice in Alice's Adventures in Wonderland, and she went on to portray other lead roles such as Juliet in Romeo and Juliet, Princess Aurora in The Sleeping Beauty and Swanida in Coppelia. In May 2021, the Royal Ballet announced that O'Sullivan's promotion to principal dancer will take effect in September 2021. In March 2022, she debuted as Odette/Odile in Swan Lake. Later that year, she stunned audiences with her portrayal as Gertrudis in Like Water for Chocolate, where her duet with Juan is mutually aggressive, primal, and breathless and left audiences yearning for more. In December 2025, she took an opportunity away from the Royal Ballet to make her musical theatre debut in Christopher Wheeldon’s production of An American in Paris at Grand Théâtre de Genève where she made a stunning appearance in the singing and dancing role of Lise Dassin. In May 2026, she debuted as Lise in La Fille mal gardée

== Personal life ==
O'Sullivan has a private personal life. She is a practising Catholic, regular at church and very family-orientated.

== Selected repertoire ==
O'Sullivan's repertoire with The Royal Ballet includes:

- Princess Aurora, Princess Florine, Florestan’s Sister, Fairy of the Golden Vine, Fairy of the Song Bird and White Cat in The Sleeping Beauty
- Swanilda in Coppelia
- 1st Movement, Concerto
- Dorabella in Enigma Variations
- Alice in Alice's Adventures in Wonderland
- Clara and Sugar Plum Fairy in The Nutcracker
- Juliet in Romeo and Juliet
- Olga in Onegin
- Kitri and Amour in Don Quixote
- Cinderella and The Fairy Spring in Cinderella
- Pas de six and Moyna in Giselle
- Odette/Odile, Neapolitan, Cygnet and pas de trois in Swan Lake
- Princess Louise and Princess Stephanie in Mayerling
- Vera in A Month in the Country
- Calliope in Apollo
- Gertrudis in Like Water for Chocolate
- Apricot girl and Blue girl in Dances at a Gathering
- Blue Girl in Les Patineurs
- 4th Movement in Symphony in C
- Infra
- ‘Emeralds’ in Jewels
- After the Rain
- Within the Golden Hour,
- La Bayadère
- Tchaikovsky Pas de deux
- La Fille mal gardée pas de deux
- Voices of spring

=== Created roles ===
- Multiverse
- Woolf Works
- Symphonic Dances
- Gertrudis in Like Water for Chocolate
