= James Hay (dancer) =

English dancer

James Hay (born c. 1989) is a British dancer, and a first soloist with the Royal Ballet in London.

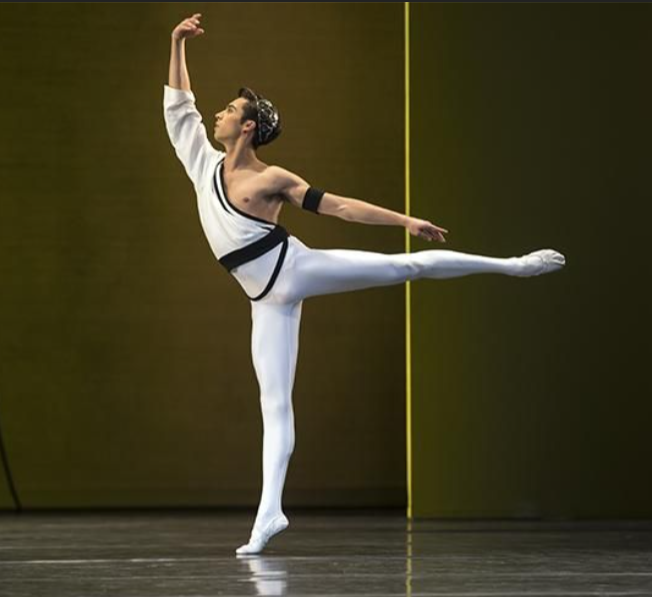
James Hay, Symphonic Variations of Frederick Ashton

== Biography ==
James was born in Berkshire and began his training at the Linda Butler School of Dance. He later joined Royal Ballet School as a Junior Associate at age eight and then effectively at age 11.

In the summer of 1999 he first performed on stage with the Royal Ballet, at the reopening of the Royal Opera House after refurbishment, at the age of nine, he was one of the children who took part in the ballet The Sleeping Beauty , in the version of Kirov Ballet, after the ballet was reconstructed.

Before that, while the theater was closed, he had appeared as a kid in the revival of Ondine's Royal Ballet by Sir Frederick Ashton at Sadler's Wells.

“I still have pantyhose with my name on it as a reminder of my first show with the company. The costume department found them and gave them to me: they are tiny." - Says James Hay at DanceTabs

As a student he won the Young British Dancer of the Year 2006 award and the Lynn Seymour Award for expressive dance in 2007, that year also becoming the winner of the Prix de Lausanne. Upon his graduation he was awarded the Dame Ninette de Valois prize as best graduate. Further accolades include the Audience Award at the 2012 Erik Bruhn Award, when he danced with Francesca Hayward. They were trained by Johan Kobborg in the double step of the Genzano Flower Festival.

He joined the company of the Royal Ballet after graduating in 2008, Johan Kobborg had included him on a short tour of Denmark during his first season with the Royal Ballet.

He was then promoted to First Artist in 2011, Soloist in 2012 and First Soloist in 2015. He created numerous roles with the Company, including Aeternum and Hansel (Hansel and Gretel) in 2013, James was originally Paul Kay's replacement for the latter the Liam Scarlett ballet for the Linbury Studio Theater. When Kay got injured, Hay took on the role of Hansel, alongside Leanne Cope, who danced Gretel.

He debuted in the ballets of Sir Frederick Ashton, Monotones on 24 November 2015 and The Two Pigeons on 5 December as the Young.

== Repertoire ==
His repertoire includes:

- Rhapsody
- Prince Florimund (The Sleeping Beauty)
- Young Man (The Two Pigeons)
- Hans-Peter / Nutcracker (The Nutcracker)
- Lewis Carroll / The White Rabbit (Alice's Adventures in Wonderland)
- Florizel (The Winter's Tale)
- Henry Clerval (Frankenstein)
- Bratfisch (Mayerling)
- Alain (La Fille mal gardée)
- Symphony in C
- Concert
- Kshchessinska's Partner (Anastasia)
- Fool (The Prince of the Pagodas)
- Jester (Cinderella)
- Puck (The Dream)
- Beggar Chief (Manon)
- Polyphonia
- Symphonic Variations
- Ceremony of Innocence
- Vertiginous Thirll of Exactitude
- Woolf Works
- Within The Golden Hour
- Benvolio, Mercutio and Lead Mandolin (Romeo and Juliet)
- Bluebird and Florestan (The Sleeping Beauty)
- lead pas de six (Giselle)
- Texan Kangaroo Rat ('Still Life' at the Penguin Café)
- Kolia (A Month in the Country)
- Rhapsody
- Les Patineurs
- 'Emeralds' (Jewels)
- Multiverse
- Obsidian Tear
- Woolf Works
- Monotones I

=== He has created roles in ===
Asphodel Meadows, Sweet Violets, Alice's Adventures in Wonderland, Hansel and Gretel, Aeternum, Untouchable and Symphonic Dances.

== Awards ==
- 2006, Young British Dancer of the Year
- 2007, Lynn Seymour Award for expressive dance
- 2007, Prix de Lausanne.
- Dame Ninette de Valois, as the best graduate
- 2012, Audience Award at the Erik Bruhn Award
