= English National Ballet School =

English ballet school

Location
- Carlyle Building; Hortensia Road; London, SW10 0QS; United Kingdom; 51.48190°N 0.18570°W

Information
- Type: Independent Further Education
- Established: 1988
- Founder: Peter Schaufuss
- Specialist: Classical Ballet
- Ofsted: Reports
- Chairman of Governors: James Mee
- Artistic Director: Lynne Charles
- Executive Director: Amanda Skoog
- Gender: Coeducational
- Age: 16 to 19
- NQF Qualification: National Diploma in Professional Dance
- Accreditations: Trinity College, London; Council for Dance Education & Training

English National Ballet School is a specialist classical ballet school based in London in the United Kingdom. The School was founded in 1988 by Peter Schaufuss as the official school of English National Ballet. The School's current artistic director is Lynne Charles.

== Overview ==
English National Ballet School is a specialist training centre for young ballet dancers aged 16 to 19. Many graduates become dancers with English National Ballet as well as with other international ballet companies.

== History ==
The School was founded in 1988 by then director Peter Schaufuss of English National Ballet as a feeder school for the company. It began with just 12 students, sharing premises with the company. The School grew rapidly, and in 1995 Diana, Princess of Wales opened its new premises in Chelsea, enabling it to train many more dancers.

Today the School exists as a separate entity but maintains strong links with its parent company, around a third of whose dancers are graduates of the School. Students perform in ENB's touring productions of My First Ballet as well as in the company's main stage productions and those of other leading UK companies. The School's own performances are widely noted, with Dance Europe describing the Winter 2019 performance as 'a terrific show...both entertaining and thoughtful.'

English National Ballet School has an associate programme, ENBS Juniors, for girls and boys aged 3 and up. In 2020, the School initiated a Graduate Trainee Programme as a response to the global pandemic.

== Notable alumni ==
- Adéla, dancer turned singer-songwriter
- Ruth Brill, choreographer and first artist with Birmingham Royal Ballet
- Constance Devernay, principal dancer with Scottish Ballet
- Hope Muir, artistic director of National Ballet of Canada, Former artistic director of Charlotte Ballet
- Nancy Osbaldeston, principal dancer with Royal Ballet of Flanders
- Laurretta Summerscales, principal dancer with Bavarian State Ballet
- Erina Takahashi, lead principal dancer with English National Ballet

== Notable teachers ==
- David Yow
- Senri Kou
- Michael Berkin
- Juan Eymar
- Şebnem Önal
- Nicola Simpson
- Amanda Armstrong
- Giovanni Luca Braccia
- Alfreda Thorogood
