= Lauren Cuthbertson =

English ballerina

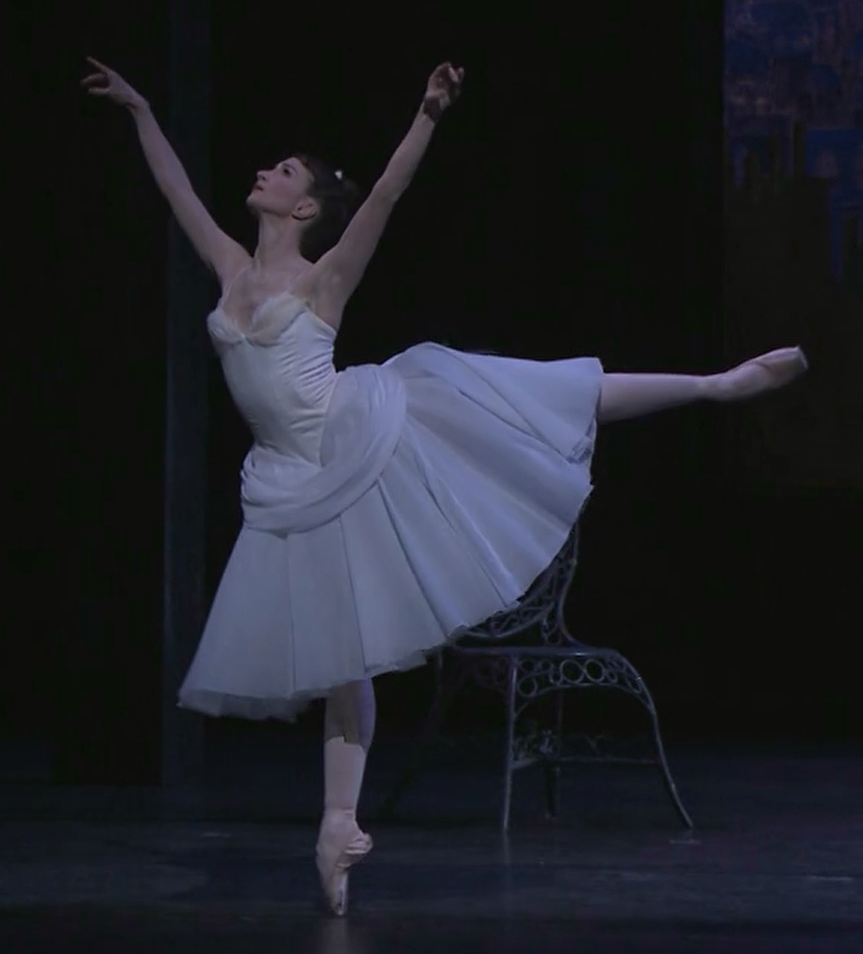
- Lauren Cuthbertson - The Two Pigeons
- Born: Lauren Louise Cuthbertson; 11 June 1984 (age 42); Devon, England
- Education: Royal Ballet School
- Occupation: Ballet dancer

Portrait of a Dancer - Lauren Cuthbertson from Nowness

Lauren Louise Cuthbertson (born 11 June 1984) is an English ballerina and a principal dancer with the Royal Ballet in London.

== Early life and education ==
Lauren Cuthbertson was born in Devon in 1984. She began studying dance at a local dance school run by Pamela De Waal (now the Buckingham Dance Studios in Paignton), becoming focused on classical ballet when she was offered a place on the Royal Ballet School's Junior Associate Programme. As a junior associate, she took part in weekly classes based on the Royal Ballet School training system. These are held in major cities throughout the UK, for young dancers who show a particular aptitude for ballet.

Cuthbertson later auditioned successfully for a permanent place at the Royal Ballet School based at White Lodge, Richmond Park. She attended the school from the age of 11-16 and was then offered a place to further her training at the upper school. Skipping 2nd year, she went straight into the 3rd year and graduated at age 17.

== Career ==
She joined The Royal Ballet in February 2002, as a member of the corps de ballet. She was promoted to soloist in September 2003, first soloist in September 2006 and then principal in June 2008. The position of principal is the highest rank in the ballet company and identifies her as one of the leading dancers.

In 2011, the Royal Ballet premiered its first new full-length ballet in 16 years, Alice's Adventures in Wonderland. Cuthbertson originated the title role of Alice in the ballet, to acclaim from dance critics. In 2014, she originated the role of Queen Hermione in a second full-length ballet, The Winter's Tale.

== Personal life ==
Cuthbertson has two daughters, born in 2020 and 2023.

== Awards ==
Cuthbertson's awards include:

- Arts and Culture Women of the Future Award 2007
- Varna International Ballet Competition (Silver) 2006
- Critics Circle Award, Outstanding Classical Artist Nominated for The Southwark Newcomer Award 2004
- Adeline Genée Award (Silver) 2001
- Young British Dancer of the Year 2001
- Dame Ninette de Valois Award 2001–2002
- Phyllis Bedell's Bursary Award 2000
- Lynn Seymour Award for Expressive Dance 2000
- Young British Dancer of the Year (Silver) 2000
