= Joseph Sissens =

British ballet dancer

Joseph Sissens (born 26 December 1998) is a British ballet dancer who is a principal dancer with The Royal Ballet at Covent Garden in London. He graduated from the Royal Ballet School in 2016. He was promoted to principal dancer in 2024.

Sissens is of Anglo-Caribbean descent and was born in Cambridge. He describes himself as British-Jamaican.

== Career ==
Joining The Royal Ballet in 2016, he earned his first promotion in 2018 as he was named first artist before being promoted to soloist in 2021 and first soloist in 2022. At the end of the 2024 season Sissens was promoted to principal dancer by director Kevin O'Hare.

He made his debut in a soloist role in 2017, at the age of 19, dancing in Frederick Ashton’s Symphonic Variations. He has since originated roles in contemporary works such as Crystal Pite’s Flight Pattern and Robert Binet’s Void and Fire.

He has worked closely with choreographers like Wayne McGregor, performing in pieces such as Obsidian Tear and Yugen.

== Early life and training ==
Sissens was born at Addenbrooke’s Hospital in Cambridge to a British mother and Jamaican father. Growing up in Hertfordshire as one of six siblings, he was a shy and introverted child, but found confidence and self-expression through dance. The fascination with dance started when he accompanied his sister to ballet class, where he would hide in the back and make up his own classes. The teacher soon encouraged him to join, and his passion for dance was born. At eight years old he was offered a scholarship at Tring Park School for the Performing Arts, where he would study for five years before being offered a scholarship at the Royal Ballet School. He graduated from the Royal Ballet School in 2016 joining the Royal Ballet the same year.

== Selected repertoire ==
Sissens has danced a wide range of roles in both the classical ballet canon and contemporary works by leading choreographers.

=== Classical roles ===
- 'Prince Siegfried' & 'Benno' in Swan Lake
- 'Romeo' & 'Mercutio' in Romeo and Juliet
- 'Lensky' in Onegin
- 'Prince' in Cinderella
- 'Prince' & 'Hans-Peter' in The Nutcracker
- 'Florizel' in The Winter's Tale
- 'Lescaut' in Manon
- 'White Rabbit '& 'The Mad Hatter' in Alice’s Adventures in Wonderland
- 'Bluebird' & 'Florestan' in The Sleeping Beauty
- 'Espada' in Don Quixote

=== Contemporary roles ===
- Requiem (MacMillan)
- Symphony in C (Balanchine)
- The Statement (Pite)
- Flight Pattern (Pite)
- Light of Passage (Pite)
- Woolf Works (McGregor)
- Chroma (McGregor)
- Void and Fire (McGregor)
- Yugen (McGregor)
- The Dante Project (McGregor)
- Untitled, 2023 (McGregor)

== Physical attributes and style ==
Sissens is known for his lean physique and long limbs, features that contribute to an expansive line and refined classical form. His physical attributes support a stage presence described as elegant and controlled, with an emphasis on clarity of movement and technical precision.

He has been characterised as a modern male lead, often favouring subtlety and restraint over displays of virtuosity. In Cinderella, his interpretation of the Prince was noted for its precise and understated style, diverging from more theatrical readings of the role.

Sissens has also received recognition for his work in contemporary choreography. His performance in Wayne McGregor’s Chroma was commended for its speed, flexibility and articulation, highlighting his ability to transition between classical and modern techniques. His versatility across repertory has been cited as a defining feature of his artistic identity.

== Activism ==
In 2024, he spearheaded Legacy, a ballet gala celebrating artists of colour, with the stated aim of “celebrating Black and Brown excellence.” The gala premiered at the Linbury Theatre at the Royal Opera House in October 2024 featuring dancers including Céline Gittens and Precious Adams.

Sissens, who identifies as queer, has described ballet as a crucial outlet during his youth, and continues to advocate for greater LGBTQ+ inclusivity in the art form.

== Awards and honours ==
In 2021, Sissens was awarded a Black British Theatre Award in Best Dance Performance in a Dance Production for The Statement. His awards further include a second prize at the 2014 Young British Dancer of the Year and second prize at the 2015 Ursula Moreton Choreographic Award for his choreography created for the piece Let My People Go.
