= Corybantic Games =

Ballet by Christopher Wheeldon

- Choreographer: Christopher Wheeldon
- Music: Leonard Bernstein
- Premiere: 15 March 2018; Royal Opera House
- Original ballet company: The Royal Ballet
- Design: Erdem Moralıoğlu; Jean-Marc Puissant

Corybantic Games is a ballet choreographed by Christopher Wheeldon to Bernstein's Serenade after Plato's "Symposium", with costumes designed by Erdem Moralıoğlu and sets designed by Jean-Marc Puissant. It premiered on 15 March 2018 at the Royal Opera House, danced by The Royal Ballet.

== Production ==
Christopher Wheeldon had previously choreographed to Bernstein's Serenade after Plato's "Symposium" in a piece titled Corybantic Ecstasies, created for the Boston Ballet and premiered in 1999.

The 2018 Corybantic Games was commissioned for Bernstein's centennial. The title is a reference to Corybants, which according to Greek mythology, were the armed and crested dancers who worshipped the Phrygian goddess Cybele with drumming and dancing. The ballet made no reference to Plato's Symposium, the inspiration of Bernstein's score. It is performed by 21 dancers.

The set was designed by Jean-Marc Puissant and the lighting was designed by Peter Mumford. Erdem Moralıoğlu, known for his own label, ERDEM, was brought in to design the costume. Moralıoğlu met Wheeldon at one of his fashion shows, and the two were introduced to each other through principal dancer Lauren Cuthbertson, a friend of Moralıoğlu. Moralıoğlu himself had seen several Royal Ballet performances, including Wheeldon's After the Rain and The Winter's Tale. He said the costumes of Corybantic Games are about "flesh, and youth, and life". It was also the first time he designed for men. Due to Moralıoğlu's involvement, the publicity regarding the ballet before its premiere was mainly about the costumes.

== Original cast ==
Original cast:

- Matthew Ball
- William Bracewell
- Lauren Cuthbertson
- Tierney Heap
- Ryoichi Hirano
- Mayara Magri
- Yasmine Naghdi
- Marcelino Sambé
- Beatriz Stix-Brunell

== Critical reception ==
Corybantic Games received a range of positive to mixed reviews. The Guardian's Judith Mackrell commented that Wheeldon was "working at the top of his game." Roslyn Sulcas of The New York Times wrote, "[i]t’s not perfect... but it's exhilaratingly full of creative force." The Stage critic Neil Norman wrote, "[f]itfully engaging, amusing and overcrowded, it's a triumph of style over content." The Daily Telegraph's dance critic Mark Monahan criticised the costumes and called it "gaffer-tape chic".

At the 2013 Laurence Olivier Awards, Aeternum won the award for Best New Dance Production.

At the 2018 National Dance Awards, Wheeldon was nominated for Best Classical Choreography.
