= National Dance Awards 2008 =

Annual award

The National Dance Awards 2008, were organised and presented by The Critics' Circle, and were awarded to recognise excellence in professional dance in the United Kingdom. The ceremony was held at the Sadler's Wells Theatre, London, on 26 January 2009, with awards given for productions staged in the previous year.

== Awards Presented ==
- Outstanding Achievement in Dance - Richard Alston, choreographer and founder Richard Alston Dance Company
- Best Male Dancer - Edward Watson of The Royal Ballet
- Best Female Dancer - Agnes Oaks of the English National Ballet
- Best Choreography (Classical) - Christopher Wheeldon for Electric Counterpoint for The Royal Ballet
- Best Choreography (Modern) - Hofesh Shechter, for In Your Rooms for his own company
- Best Foreign Dance Company - New York City Ballet, from United States of America
- Female Artist (Modern) - Kate Coyne
- Male Artist (Modern) - Anh Ngoc Nguyen of Wayne McGregor Random Dance
- Female Artist (Classical) - Yuhui Choe of The Royal Ballet
- Male Artist (Classical) - Martin Harvey of The Royal Ballet
- Outstanding Company - English National Ballet
- Patron's Award - Northern Ballet Theatre
- Working Title Billy Elliot Award - Michael Guihot-Jouffray
- Industry Award - Janet Smith, Artistic Director of Scottish Dance Theatre

== Special awards ==
No special awards were presented for the 2008 season.
