= Matthew Ball (dancer) =

British ballet dancer (born 1993)

- Born: 14 December 1993 (age 32); Liverpool, England
- Education: The Royal Ballet School
- Occupation: Ballet dancer
- Career
- Current group: The Royal Ballet

Matthew Ball (born 14 December 1993) is an English ballet dancer and is currently a principal dancer with The Royal Ballet.

== Early life ==
Ball was born in December 1993 in Liverpool. His mother is a GCSE dance teacher and his father works in arts education. He started dancing at the age of 6, entered the Royal Ballet Lower School at 11 and moved to the Upper School at 16. He graduated in 2013, but was unable to take part in the graduation performance because of knee surgery.

== Career ==
External videos
- Romeo and Juliet – Balcony Pas de deux (The Royal Ballet), YouTube video
- The Sleeping Beauty – Bluebird pas de deux (Yasmine Naghdi, Matthew Ball; The Royal Ballet), YouTube video

Ball joined The Royal Ballet in the 2013/14 season, became a First Artist in 2015, Soloist in 2016 and First Soloist in 2017.

In March 2018, he was tasked with replacing an injured David Hallberg mid-show as Albrecht in Giselle, even though he had only danced the role once, and had never danced in a full-length ballet before with Natalia Osipova, the ballerina playing the title role. Ball's performance was given an ovation by the audience and praised in the review by The Times. Ball was promoted to principal dancer in July that year. In December, he took time off from the Royal Ballet for 32 performances as the lead swan in Matthew Bourne's Swan Lake at the Sadler's Wells Theatre.

He has danced lead roles in ballets such as Swan Lake, La Bayadère, Don Quixote, Ashton's Marguerite and Armand and McGregor's Infra. He had less than two weeks to prepare his debut as Crown Prince Rudolf in MacMillan's Mayerling to replace another injured dancer. He has also created roles in new works such as Wheeldon's Corybantic Games, Marriott's The Unknown Soldier, and Marston's The Cellist.

In 2020, Ball was featured in the BBC documentary Men at the Barre. Later that year, in the first series of performances since the Royal Opera House's closure due to the 2019-20 coronavirus pandemic, he and Mayara Magri performed a pas de deux from Christopher Wheeldon's Within the Golden Hour, having learnt it in five days.

== Personal life ==
As of 2023, Ball lived in north London, with his partner, fellow Royal Ballet principal Mayara Magri.

== Selected repertoire ==
Ball's repertoire with the Royal Ballet includes:

- Solor in La Bayadère
- Basilio in Don Quixote
- Albrecht and pas de six in Giselle
- Prince in The Nutcracker
- Prince Florimund and Bluebird in The Sleeping Beauty
- Prince Siegfried in Swan Lake
- Officer in Anastasia
- Lysander in The Dream
- Armand in Marguerite and Armand
- Crown Prince Rudolf in Mayerling
- Matvei and Beliaev in A Month in the Country
- Romeo in Romeo and Juliet
- Lensky in Onegin
- Young Man in The Two Pigeons
- Escamillo in Carmen
- Aeternum
- Afternoon of a Faun
- Jewels
- Scènes de ballet
- Woolf Works
- Yugen

=== Created roles ===
- Albert de Belleroche in Strapless
- Dr. John Brown in Like Water for Chocolate
- The Cellist
- Connectome
- Corybantic Games
- The Illustrated 'Farewell'
- Medusa
- Multiverse
- Obsidian Tear
- The Unknown Soldier
- Untouchable
