= Fumi Kaneko =

Japanese ballet dancer

Fumi Kaneko 金子扶生
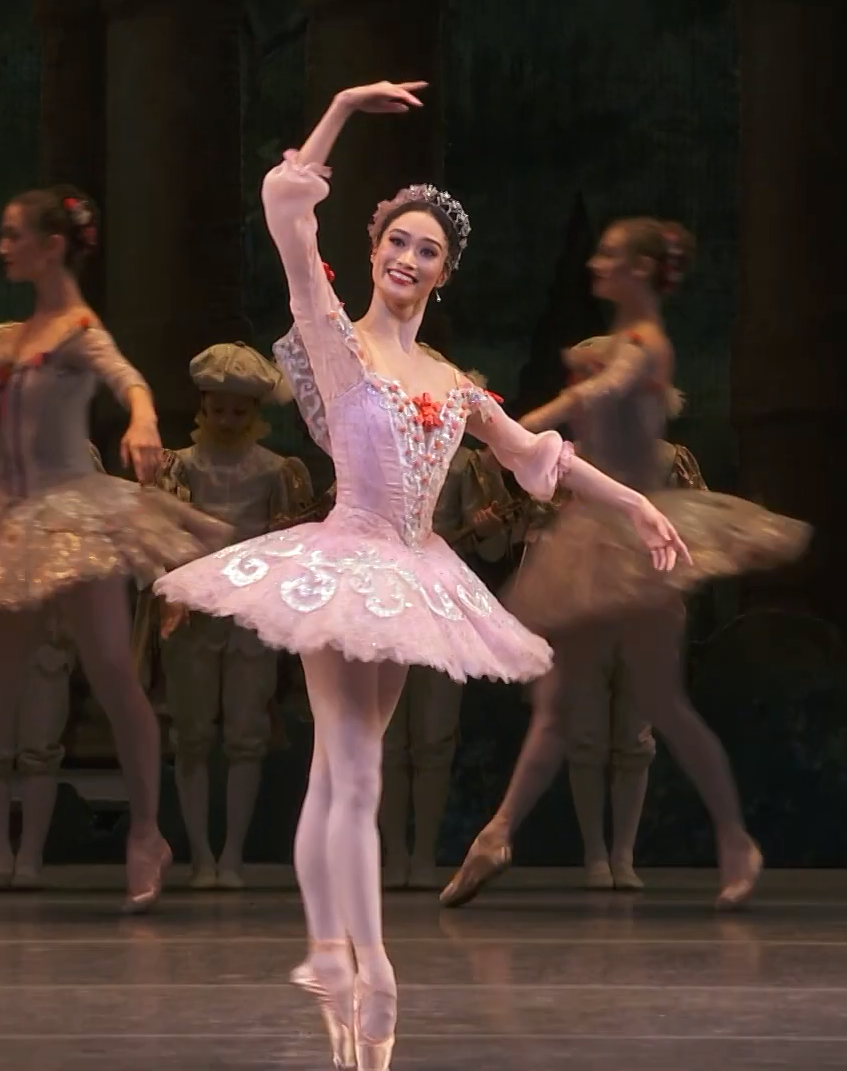
- Kaneko in The Sleeping Beauty
- Born: October 1991; Jōtō-ku, Osaka, Japan
- Education: Jinushi Kaoru Ballet School
- Occupation: ballet dancer
- Years active: 2010–present
- Spouse: Vadim Muntagirov (m. 2026)
- Dancing career
- Current group: The Royal Ballet
- Former groups: Jinushi Kaoru Ballet Company

Fumi Kaneko (金子 扶生, Kaneko Fumi, born October 1991) is a Japanese ballet dancer. She joined the Royal Ballet in London in 2011, and was named a principal dancer in 2021.

== Early life ==
Kaneko was born and raised in Osaka. She started ballet at age three, and at eight, she started attending Jinushi Kaoru Ballet School until 11 pm. Her training was mainly in the Russian style.

Due to the lack of performance opportunities for young dancers in Japan, she competed in various international competitions, winning first class distinction at Varna International Ballet Competition in 2008, and silver medals at Moscow International Ballet Competition in 2009 and USA International Ballet Competition in 2010.

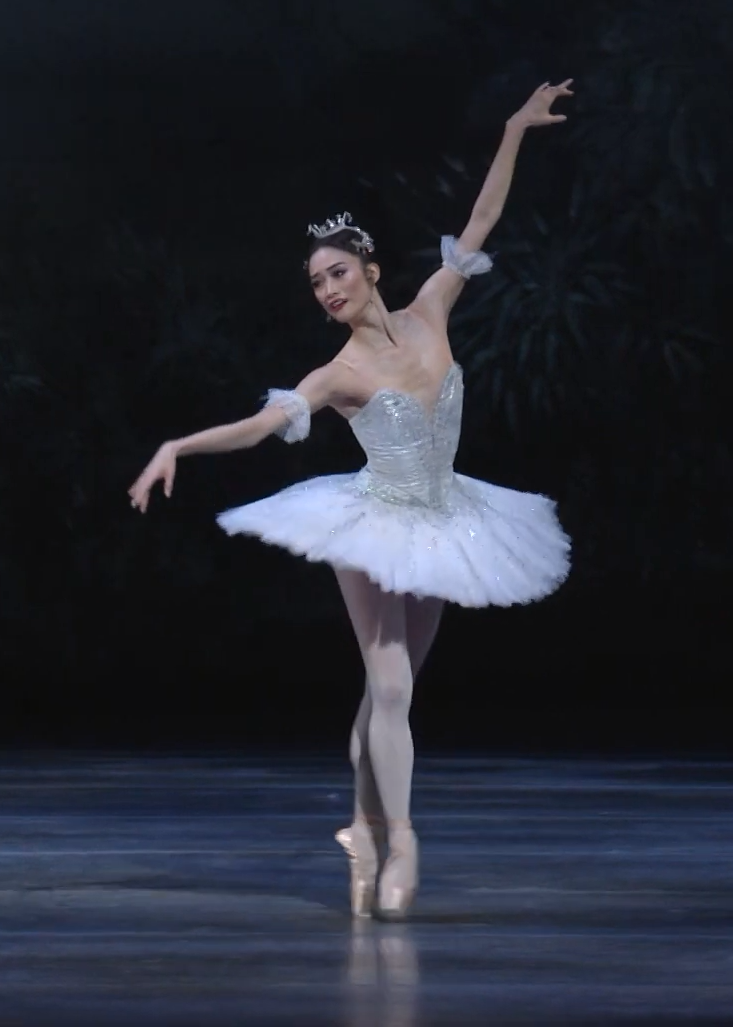
Fumi Kaneko, The Sleeping Beauty

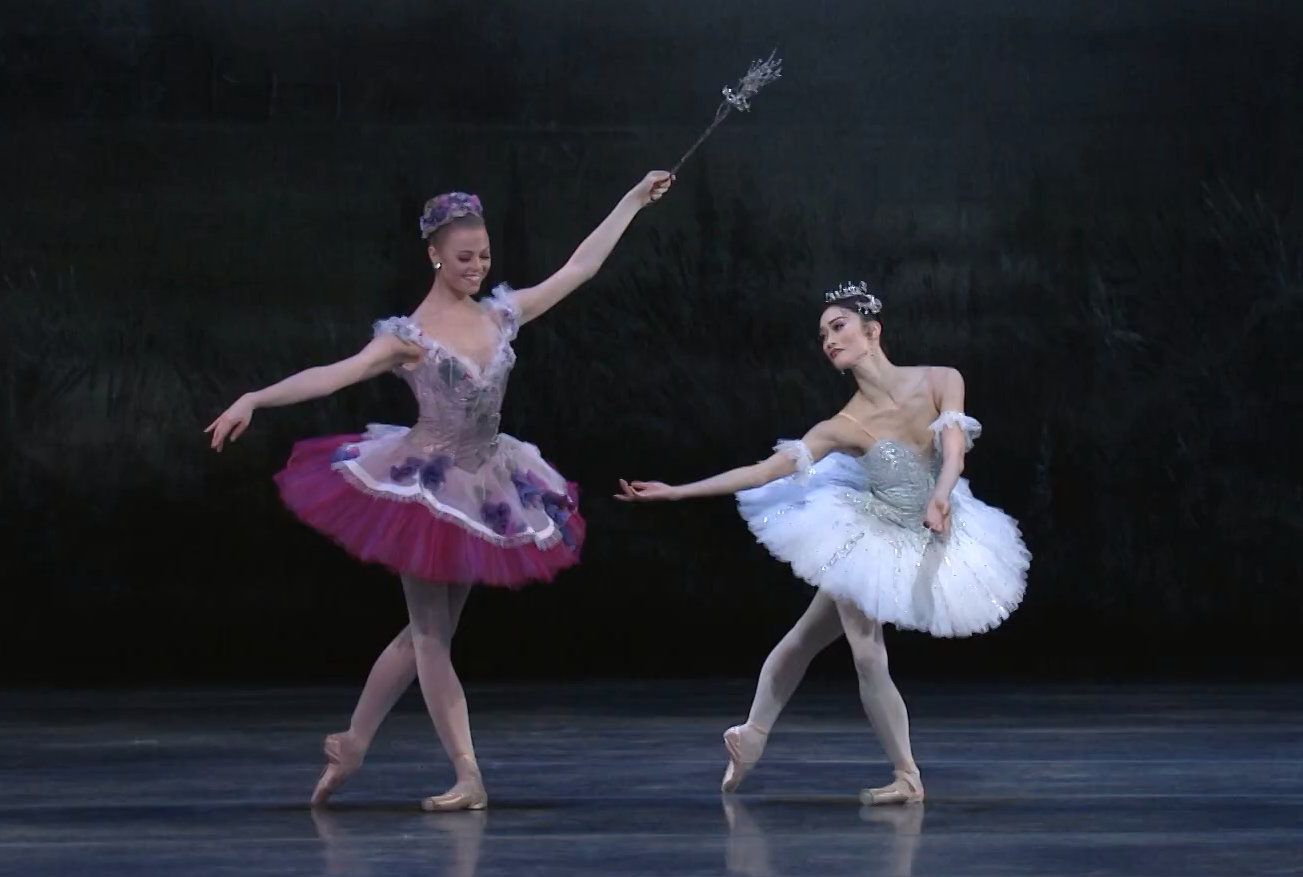
Gina Storm-Jensen and Fumi Kaneko, The Sleeping Beauty

== Career ==
Kaneko joined the Jinushi Kaoru Ballet Company in 2010, before joining The Royal Ballet in London in April 2011, even though at the time she did not speak English. She was named first artist in 2012, soloist in 2013, and first soloist in 2018. Lead roles she danced include Kitri in Don Quixote, Sugar Plum Fairy in The Nutcracker and Aurora in The Sleeping Beauty, as well as in MacMillan's Concerto and Balanchine's Symphony in C. She also needed surgery twice after picking up serious injuries, which forced her to stop training for some time.

In January 2020, Kaneko was supposed to dance in the cinema relay of The Sleeping Beauty as the Lilac Fairy, but danced the lead role Aurora in order to replace an injured Lauren Cuthbertson. Later that year, her debut as Odette/Odile in Swan Lake was delayed due to the COVID-19 pandemic.

In May 2021, she was promoted to principal dancer. Her first performance after her promotion was in Wheeldon's Within the Golden Hour. Since her promotion, she has made her debut as Juliet in MacMillan's Romeo and Juliet, and as Odette/Odile in Swan Lake. She also originated the role of Satan in McGregor's The Dante Project, and in Abraham's The Weathering. In March 2022, Kaneko appeared in a gala benefitting the Disasters Emergency Committee (DEC) Ukraine Humanitarian Appeal at the London Coliseum, performing the white swan pas de deux from Swan Lake with William Bracewell.

== Personal life ==
As of 2019, Kaneko lives in Chiswick, West London. She married fellow Royal Ballet principal Vadim Muntagirov on 11 February 2026.
