= William Bracewell =

Welsh ballet dancer

- Born: 13 May 1991 (age 35); Swansea, Wales
- Education: Royal Ballet School
- Occupation: ballet dancer
- Years active: 2010–present
- Career
- Current group: The Royal Ballet
- Former groups: Birmingham Royal Ballet

William Bracewell (born 13 May 1991) is a Welsh ballet dancer. He joined the Birmingham Royal Ballet in 2010, and was named soloist in 2014. In 2017, he joined the Royal Ballet in London, and was promoted to principal dancer in 2022. He is the first Welsh person to hold the position.

== Early life and training ==
Bracewell was born in Swansea, to a landscape gardener and a midwife. He has two older sisters, and no one in the family danced prior to him. He began ballet at age eight, when a friend asked him to join her because there were no boys. His mother, who found the young Bracewell to be "hyperactive", encouraged him, but his father had unsuccessfully persuaded him to pursue rugby. He told his friends he was training in martial arts to avoid bullying. He trained at a local dance school run by Pamela Miller for three years, during which he took the Cecchetti exams and participated in the Royal Ballet School Junior Associate programme, before attending the school in London full-time. In 2007, he competed for Young British Dancer of the Year, and received a commendation. He won the following year. In 2010, Bracewell won the Grand Prix, the top prize, at the Youth America Grand Prix New York final. He graduated that year.

== Career ==
In 2010, Bracewell joined the Birmingham Royal Ballet. The company had wanted Bracewell to start dancing there in the middle of the school year, though Gailene Stock, the director of the Royal Ballet School, arranged to have him join the company after he graduated instead. The first ballet Bracewell appeared in was MacMillan's Romeo and Juliet. He was promoted to first artist in 2012, and soloist in 2014. He performed as Benno in Swan Lake, as Oberon in Ashton's The Dream, in Symphonic Variations, as Romeo in MacMillan's Romeo and Juliet, as the Salamander Prince in Bintley's The Prince of the Pagodas, and in Tombeaux, He originated a role in Whitley's Kin in 2014, and the role of le Roi Soleil, or Louis XIV, Bintley's The King Dances in 2015. For the latter, he won Outstanding Male Performance (Classical) at the 2015 National Dance Awards.

In 2017, Bracewell joined the Royal Ballet in London as a soloist. The following year, he created roles in Wheeldon's Corybantic Games and McGregor's Yugen. He was promoted to first soloist later that year. In 2019, he starred as Romeo in the film Romeo and Juliet: Beyond Words, opposite Francesca Hayward's Juliet. In October 2020, in the Royal Ballet's first full company performance since the COVID-19 pandemic, he danced as Oberon in an excerpt of Ashton's The Dream. In March 2022, Bracewell appeared in a gala benefitting the Disasters Emergency Committee (DEC) Ukrayina Humanitarian Appeal at the London Coliseum, performing the white swan pas de deux from Swan Lake with Fumi Kaneko. The same month, he originated a role in Abraham's The Weathering. Two months later, he danced in Royal Ballet's special performance of Swan Lake, also to raise fund for DEC, in which the lead roles were split among several dancers. He danced as Prince Siegfried in the second act.

Other roles he performed at the Royal Ballet whilst a soloist and first soloist include the Prince in The Nutcracker, as Romeo in MacMillan's Romeo and Juliet, in Ashton's Les Patineurs, Robbins' Dances at a Gathering, as Rajah/Caterpillar in Wheeldon's Alice's Adventures in Wonderland, DGV: Danse à Grande Vitesse, McGregor's Obsidian Tear, and Scarlett's Asphodel Meadows.

In May 2022, the Royal Ballet announced Bracewell's promotion to principal dancer, which took effect at the start of the 2022/23 season. He is the first Welsh person to hold the position.
