= Beatriz Stix-Brunell =

American ballet dancer (born 1993)

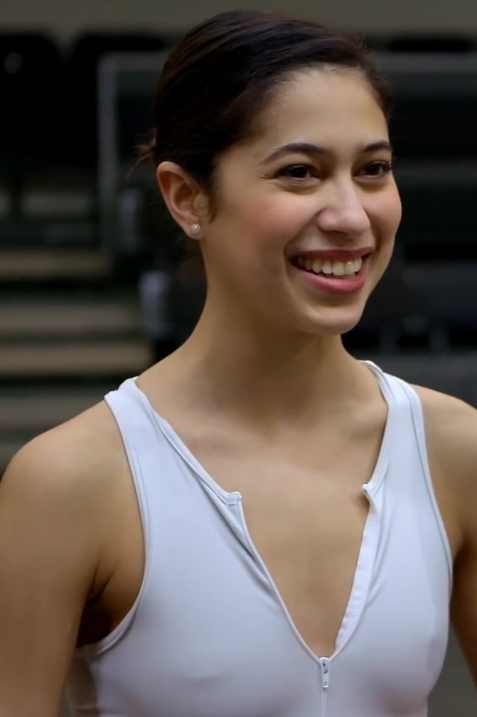
- Born: Beatriz Eugenia Stix-Brunell; January 27, 1993 (age 33); Miami, Florida, U.S.
- Occupation: Ballet dancer
- Years active: 2007–2021
- Dancing career
- Former groups: The Royal Ballet; Morphoses

Beatriz Eugenia Stix-Brunell (born 1993) is an American ballet dancer. Her career started with Morphoses when she was 14. She joined the Royal Ballet in 2010, was promoted to first soloist in 2016, and retired in 2021.

== Early life ==
Stix-Brunell was born in Miami and raised in New York City. Her father works in finance and her mother is an interior designer. She started ballet training at age seven at the School of American Ballet. She also attended Nightingale Bamford School. At age 12, she attended Paris Opera Ballet School. Her mother and brother relocated to Paris, while her father visited when possible. When Stix-Brunell first arrived, she didn't speak French, but managed to learn it in three months. After a year in Paris, though she was graded first in her class, she returned to New York to train privately and continued to study at Nightingale-Bamford.

As a National Training Scholar at American Ballet Theatre she danced in Kevin McKenzie's Sleeping Beauty.

== Career ==
At age 14, Stix-Brunell auditioned for Christopher Wheeldon's company Morphoses after seeing a flier about the company recruiting dancers, and was invited to join the company by Wheeldon. and danced works such as Apollo and Polyphonia. She danced with dancers from The Royal Ballet and New York City Ballet, including Leanne Benjamin, Edward Watson, Wendy Whelan, Maria Kowroski and Tiler Peck, and continued her schoolwork.

Stix-Brunell met Monica Mason, then-artistic director of The Royal Ballet, when Morphoses toured in London. They began an email exchange. In 2010, at age 17, Mason offered Stix-Brunell a contract to the company, without an audition. She joined the company as an Artist the same year. She made her principal debut while still an Artist, dancing the title role in Alice's Adventures in Wonderland, replacing an injured Marianela Nuñez. A few weeks later, she stepped in for Lauren Cuthbertson when she had to withdraw from The Prince of the Pagodas. During her first year in London, she completed high school via Skype.

Stix-Brunell became a Soloist in 2012, skipping the rank of First Artist, and First Soloist in 2016. Roles she performed with the company include Juliet in Romeo and Juliet, The Young Girl in The Two Pigeons, Sugar Plum Fairy in The Nutcracker and leading roles in "Emeralds" and "Diamonds" from Jewels.

In July 2021, Stix-Brunell retired from the Royal Ballet, to study at Stanford University. Her final performance was in Wheeldon's After the Rain.

== Selected repertoire ==
Stix-Brunell's repertoire with the Royal Ballet and Morphoses includes:

- Alice in Alice's Adventures in Wonderland
- Sugar Plum Fairy in The Nutcracker
- Perdita in The Winter’s Tale
- The Young Girl in The Two Pigeons
- Olga in Onegin
- Grand Duchess Tatiana in Anastasia
- Mitzi Caspar in Mayerling
- Lilac Fairy, Fairy of the Enchanted Garden and Florestan’s Sister in The Sleeping Beauty
- The After the Rain pas de deux
- Swan Lake
- Concerto
- Manon
- Ballo della regina
- La Sylphide
- Within the Golden Hour
- Polyhymnia’s variation from Apollo
- Polyphonia

=== Created roles ===
- Commedia
- Young Shepherdess in The Winter’s Tale
- ‘Trespass’ (Metamorphosis: Titian 2012)
- Untouchable
- Corybantic Games
- Woolf Works

== Awards ==
- Outstanding Female Performance (Classical) at the 2012 Critics’ Circle National Dance Awards - nominated
