= Aigana Gali =

Kazakh Artist

- Born: Ayganim Sadykova; June 23, 1980 (age 46); Almaty, Kazakhstan
- Website: aiganagali.com

Aigana Gali is a Kazakh-born British multidisciplinary artist who works primarily on canvas and textiles. She has been described as 'one of the brightest young talents of Kazakh modern art", Gali came to prominence with her solo exhibition Steppe at Georgian National Museum Shalva Amiranashvili Museum of Fine Arts Art Museum of Georgia. Her work has also been shown at the Saatchi Gallery and Royal Academy of Arts and is held in private and public collections in Russia, Europe and Kazakhstan. Gali has collaborated with numerous artists and creators including Celine Alexandre, Atelier 27, Elisabetta Cipriani, and the late architect Ricardo Bofill Levi Taller de Arquitectura Atelier. She lives and works in London, UK.

== Life and career ==
Born to a Georgian mother and Kazakhstani father, Aigana Gali was raised in Almaty, Kazakhstan, where her formative years were spent in the wild, open cradle of the Eurasian Steppe. As well as training as an artist from the age of seven, Gali also joined the Profi-Studio ballet school, graduating in 1996. The same year she won a competition to model in Paris; despite a successful career in haute couture and magazine appearances including Vogue, she was unhappy. After nearly four years she returned to Kazakhstan to continue to paint and study, gaining a Bachelor's degree from Almaty State University and a post-grad from the Kazakh Academy of Science (KazGASA).

Between 2007-2009 Gali starred in several Kazakh films, including the award-winning Strayed, which was also nominated at the Montreal World Film Festival in 2009. She also worked as a costumier and guest Art Director at the Rambert in 2010 and the Marjanishvili Theatre Tbilisi in 2014, staging Aristophanes' The Birds After moving to London in 2007, she gained a Master's Degree at Sotheby's Institute of Art

== Work ==
Gali's artistic work is divided across multiple media, from canvas and paper to textiles and bronze. Through non-figurative, large-scale canvases and textile creations, Gali explores the natural world and invokes myths and legends from different cultures. She explores universal human themes through concepts of duality, such as physical world and spiritual beliefs, reality and imagination, human constructions and nature, being and nothingness.Over the past decade she has developed several series of work related to these elements. Art critic John McEwen wrote, "Almaty is where East met West on the Great Silk Road. Miss Gali’s art is inspired by this rich history and the endless steppe of her homeland: ‘I can see its nature in everything I do... it’s the perfect “nothing'... you feel the true proportion of your personality against this enormous void.’"

=== Painting ===
In Creation Myth, shown at stART Art Fair at the Saatchi Gallery, Gali paints a story through the symbols of her ancestors, enlisting the petroglyphs of Kazakh caves and the cosmology of Tengri, an ancient form of spirituality found in the Steppe.

The Steppe series expresses Gali's spiritual connection to the topographical vastness of her native land. Conjuring the emptiness of the Eurasian Steppe, she builds layers of colour by sweeping giant brushes over canvas laid on the floor, aiming to capture the ephemeral nature of colour found in open spaces. The absence of contours can suggest form; colors and mood change constantly according to the light. Steppe was displayed at a landmark show at the Georgian National Museum Shalva Amiranashvili Museum of Fine Arts Art Museum of Georgia which was, "An all-encompassing experience that invites viewers through paintings and sound into an extraordinary, boundless world, with Turk and Central Asian contemporary music from award-winning composers Olivier Behzadi and Jimmy Green. Gali stated, "What it is like to be in a place where there is only earth and sky and nothing else, no other more perspective than this huge, disproportionate to human-size, space... when a person is between heaven and earth, he feels himself a part of this huge emptiness that is filled with everything."

Tengri: Light Works are an evolution from the abstract colour fields in Steppe, from 'nothingness' to the geometric forms of Tengri 'being'. Gali states, "Tengri comes out of the empty spaces, from the constant solitude experienced by people who for millennia have called the Steppe home. You cannot hide there. You are open to the world and to the plains. The colours and the light change constantly, and meld together. I wanted to capture this and create an ever-changing image. Tengri is the vibration of this feeling. It is an introspective spirituality. Everything - people, animals, spirits - all come from Tengri.".

In 2021 several pieces were shown at the group exhibition Light Works, "A meditation on light, the theatre of colour and the sacred geometries found in wild places." and also at the Blue Minds group show, which raised money for the charity Bluemarine Foundation and highlighted the similarities between artists and scientists in their intense observation and ability to highlight important themes. One of the pieces from Light Works, Meditator II, was chosen for the Royal Academy of Art's Summer Exhibition.

Of her process (and name change) Gali states, "When I did my masters degree, I wrote my thesis on The influence of Russian Academic school of Painting to Kazakh school. I was interested in how we had evolved from a shamanic tribe who only painted symbols for decorative art, mostly in textiles. I learnt about Aiganym [1783-1853] – the wife of the tribal leader Wali Khan – who invited painters from Russia to teach her children and grandchildren. In a way she was the root of Kazakh fine art. I was given her name, and I am a direct beneficiary of this – the importation of a very strict Soviet academic school... but at the same time the root of my practice lies underneath this in the Scythian tradition – in shamanic ritual."

=== Textiles ===
During Gali's time as a model, she developed a deep appreciation of how clothing can transform, protect and celebrate the person within. Later, as she was establishing herself as a costume designer for theatre and ballet, the idea of art-couture came to her. In her Manifestations collection, Aigana fuses her skill as a couturier with her artistic vision to create limited-edition pieces for individual clients and collections, using dye, gold leaf, embroidery and crystals.

Gali's commissioned work includes pieces for Fairmont Hotels and Resorts, Ritz Carlton, St Regis, The Falcon Castle Ashby and One Hyde Park.

== Selected exhibitions ==
- 2004 Solo show, The Alma-Ata Art Gallery, Almaty
- 2005 Solo show, Ark Art Gallery, Almaty
- 2006 Solo show, Zig-Zag Art Gallery, Almaty
- 2007 Solo Show, Abylkhan Kasteyev Museum of Arts Republic of Kazakhstan
- 2009 Solo show, OYU Art Gallery, Almaty
- 2010 Solo Show, The Gallery, Westbury Hotel, London
- 2011 The Holy Garden, The Hay Hill Gallery, London
- 2011- to present, permanent exhibition, Kensington Close Hotel
- 2013 Central Asian Art Fair London
- 2014 Solo exhibition Mayfair design Studio
- 2015 Group Exhibition, Hay Hill Gallery, London
- 2016 Group Exhibition VP studio art4.ru Museum Moscow
- 2016 Steppe, Solo exhibition, Georgian National Museum of Art, Tbilisi, Georgia
- 2016, Group Exhibition, Hay Hill Gallery, London
- 2017 Paintings, David Linley, London
- 2019 stART Art Fair, Saatchi Gallery
- 2020 Manifestations solo show, 68 Kinnerton Street, London
- 2021 Light Works, group show, 68 Kinnerton Street, London
- 2021 Blue Minds, group show, 68 Kinnerton Street, London
- 2021 Summer Exhibition, group show, Royal Academy of Arts.
- 2022 CUSP Aigana Gali/Kate Braine, Kate Braine Studio, London

== Personal life ==
Gali is married with two children and lives in London, UK.
