= National Dance Awards 2000 =

The National Dance Awards 2000, were organised and presented by The Critics' Circle, and were awarded to recognise excellence in professional dance in the United Kingdom. The ceremony was held at the Coliseum Theatre, London, on 10 January 2001, with awards given for productions staged in the previous year.

== Awards Presented ==
- Most Promising Newcomer - Akram Khan
- Outstanding Achievement in Dance - David Bintley
