= Yugen (ballet) =

2018 one-act ballet by Wayne McGregor

- Choreographer: Wayne McGregor
- Music: Leonard Bernstein
- Premiere: 15 March 2018; Royal Opera House
- Original ballet company: The Royal Ballet
- Genre: contemporary ballet

Yugen is a one-act ballet by Wayne McGregor, to Leonard Bernstein's Chichester Psalms. The ballet premiered on 15 March 2018 at the Royal Opera House, danced by The Royal Ballet.

== Production ==
External videos
- Yugen – pas de deux (Sarah Lamb, Calvin Richardson, The Royal Ballet), YouTube video
- How Leonard Bernstein inspired Wayne McGregor's 21st century ballet Yugen, YouTube video
- Wayne McGregor and Christopher Wheeldon rehearse ballets inspired by Bernstein, YouTube video

The ballet was McGregor's first new work for The Royal Ballet in two years, and was created for Bernstein's centennial. The ballet is performed by eleven dancers. The sets are designed by Edmund de Waal, a writer and potter, and features light boxes. The costumes are designed by Shirin Guild, and all dancers are in red loose-fitted outfits. The title of the ballet means the "beauty evoked with an economy of means" in Japanese (幽玄 in kanji).

Yugen is a co-production with the Dutch National Ballet, and the company will debut the ballet in September 2022. It is rescheduled from the original April 2020 date due to the COVID-19 pandemic in the Netherlands.

== Original cast ==
Original cast:

- Federico Bonelli
- William Bracewell
- Harry Churches
- Melissa Hamilton
- Francesca Hayward
- Chisato Katsura
- Paul Kay
- Sarah Lamb
- Calvin Richardson
- Joseph Sissens
- Akane Takada

== Critical reception ==
The Guardian's Judith Mackrell wrote, "McGregor’s choreography is expertly musical, seeking out the lyricism of Bernstein’s melodies in long, floating lines, and riding its energies in such cleverly massed configurations that his modest ensemble can look like a tribe." Roslyn Sulcas of the New York Times commented, "remains intensely responsive to the slightly strange fusion of sacred text and tone, with jazzy undercurrents in 'Chichester Psalms.'" The Evening Standard's Emma Byrne wrote that Yugen "marks a new maturity: gone are the attention-grabbing pyrotechnics, and in their place just sumptuous, lyrical movement."

At the 2018 National Dance Awards, McGregor was nominated for Best Classical Choreography.
