= Alexander Campbell (dancer) =

Australian ballet dancer

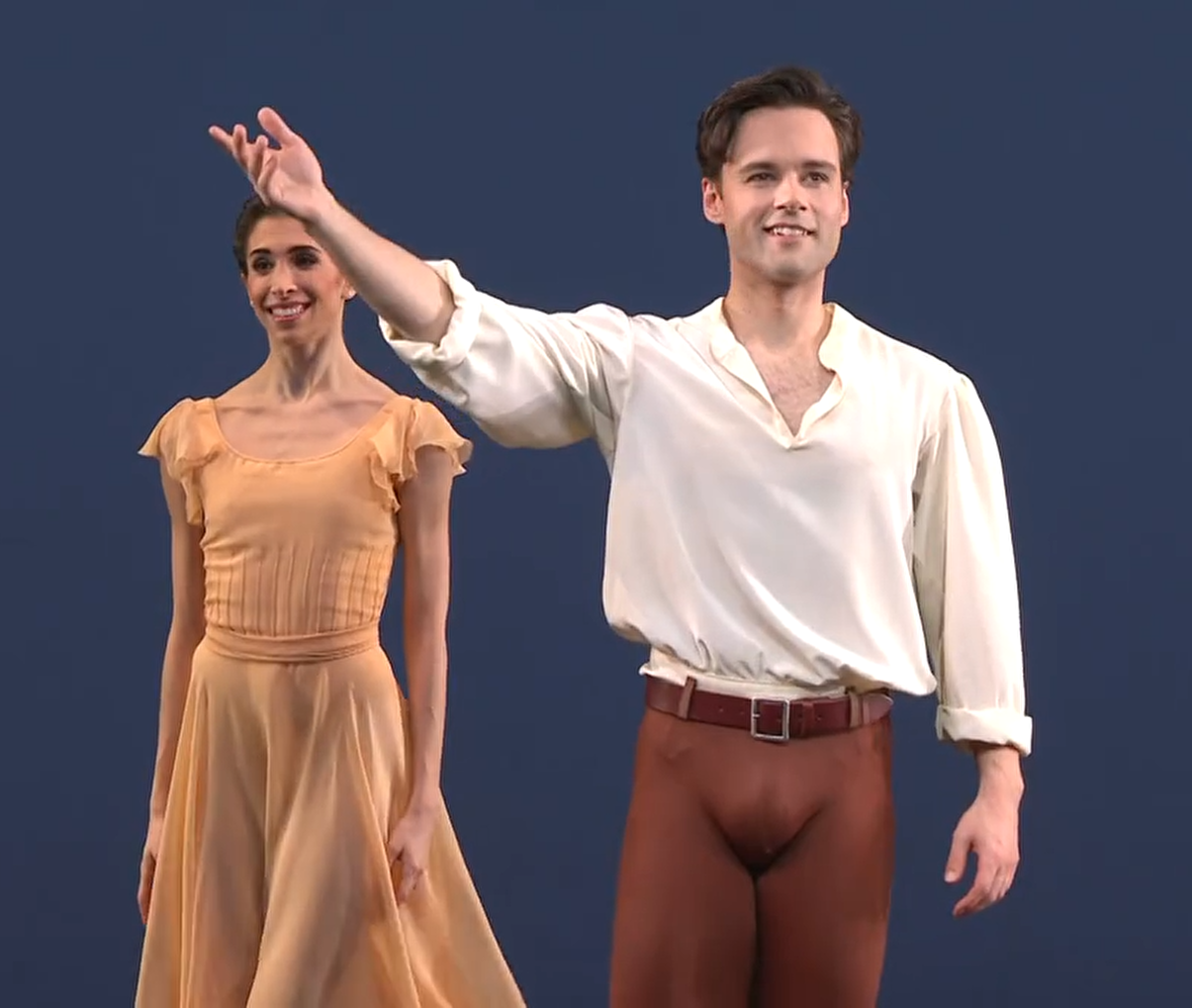
- Alexander Campbell and Yasmine Naghdi, Dances at a Gathering of Jerome Robbins
- Born: 1986 (age 39–40); Sydney, Australia
- Occupations: ballet dancer educator
- Spouse: Claire Calvert (m. 2022)
- Children: 1
- Dancing career
- Current group: Royal Academy of Dance
- Former groups: The Royal Ballet; Birmingham Royal Ballet

Alexander Campbell (born 1986) is an Australian ballet dancer and educator. He is the artistic director of the Royal Academy of Dance, and formerly a principal dancer with the Royal Ballet.

Campbell has become a spokesperson for men in ballet, appearing as a guest speaker on cricket programs, and has been an advisor to the England and Wales Cricket Board's (ECB) training programs. In June of 2017, Campbell was appointed an ambassador for the Royal Academy of Dance and Marylebone Cricket Club joint project to encourage and normalize more boys to take up ballet and more girls to take up cricket.

== Early life ==
Alexander Campbell was born in Sydney, Australia in 1986. His father is Alan Campbell, a selector and manager for Cricket New South Wales and State Director of Coaching for 20 years. Both his maternal grandmother and grandfather, Valma Briggs and Mario Desva, had been professional dancers with Ballet Rambert in London.

Campbell, although training under Nicholina Kuner at the Academy Ballet school on the east side of Sydney, at first viewed ballet as a hobby alongside his participation in the sport of cricket. By the age of 14, both ballet and cricket were his passions. Realizing that progress to a professional career in either discipline meant he had to concentrate on just one, he later said, 'I struggled with the decision for a long time but my love for ballet and the opportunity to do something that seemed unusual for a kid from Sydney was enticing.'

As his training progressed, Campbell was inspired by the performance style of Mikhail Baryshnikov.

== Awards ==
In 2002, Campbell won the McDonald's Ballet Scholarship at the Sydney Eisteddfod enabling him to approach the Royal Ballet Upper School in London. In 2003, he auditioned for the school and was offered a place. In that same year, he was a finalist in the Prix de Lausanne and won the Genee International Ballet Competition.

== Professional career ==
In 2005, at the age of 18, he started his professional career graduating into the Birmingham Royal Ballet and was promoted to the position of the first artist followed by promotion to soloist (2007) and first soloist in 2009.

During his time with Birmingham Royal Ballet, his repertory included: both Romeo and Mercutio (Romeo and Juliet), Franz (Coppelia), Prince (The Sleeping Beauty, Cinderella and The Nutcracker,) Sam and Will Moffit (Hobson's Choice).Cyrano (Cyrano) and Petrusha. He created the roles of Young Man in Michael Corder's La Baiser de la fée and Celeritas^{2} in David Bintley's E=mc^{2}. In 2009 Campbell danced Puck in The Dream.

In 2011 he joined the Royal Ballet as a soloist at Covent Garden and was promoted to first soloist in 2012 and principal in June 2016.

As first soloist at The Royal Ballet, Alexander performed many principal and non principal roles. During his career at Covent Garden he has danced roles in 'Emeralds'(Jewels), Voices of Spring, Concerto, In the Night, Polyphonia, Birthday Offering, Requiem, Raven Girl, Connectome, Woolf Works, Swan Lake, Giselle, Viscera, Within the Golden Hour, Carbon Life and Obsidian Tear. He has danced the roles of both Hans-Peter and the Prince in The Nutcracker at the Royal Opera House. He also frequently performed the role of Mercutio (Romeo and Juliet) at Covent Garden. Campbell danced with distinction in Song of the Earth in 2015. In the same year he performed his debut in the role of Colas (La fille mal gardee) with Yuhui Choe to critical acclaim.

His first role as Principal was as partner to the acclaimed Ashtonian dancer, Roberta Marquez in La Fille Mal Gardee at her Royal Ballet farewell performance in 2016. Campbell first danced Prince Florimund in The Sleeping Beauty at Covent Garden partnering Francesca Hayward on her debut as Aurora in February 2017. Later in 2017 he danced in Rubies (Jewels), Tarantella and as Oberon in The Dream. In 2018 he debuted as Albrecht partnering Francesca Hayward in Giselle.

In April 2018 Campbell made his debut as des Grieux in Kenneth McMillan's Manon and in the same run of performances at Covent Garden danced on different days the roles of both des Grieux and Lescaut. In the following month he danced the expanded role of Benno at the World premiere of Liam Scarlett's new production of Swan Lake. In June 2019 Campbell gave a stand out performance of the 3rd movement of Symphony in C.

In major roles, Campbell toured with the Royal Ballet in Russia, Japan, the United States of America, Spain and Australia and has made guest appearances with Birmingham Royal Ballet and Australian Ballet.

In 2015 Campbell performed the role of The Devil in Will Tuckett's a Soldiers Tale in Tokyo. He partnered Francesca Hayward in Robert Binet's immersive work, The Dreamers Ever Leave You in collaboration with the National Ballet of Canada at The Printworks in London in October 2017. Campbell starred with Francesca Hayward in the BBC television documentary film Dancing the Nutcracker: Inside the Royal Ballet which was first shown on Christmas Day 2016. As a presenter, Campbell has introduced broadcasts of ballet from the Royal Opera House and co-presented World Ballet Days with Kristen McNally.

In 2024, Campbell retired from the stage to become the artistic director of the Royal Academy of Dance. His last performance was as Des Grieux in Manon.

== Work with young people ==
In 2007 Campbell appeared as Mercutio for Ballet Hoo! in a collaboration working with under-privileged children which was broadcast by Channel 4.

In June 2017 Campbell was appointed an ambassador for the Royal Academy of Dance and Marylebone Cricket Club joint project to encourage more boys to take up ballet and more girls to take up cricket. In 2017 he took part in a BBC live interactive ballet learning experience for 7- to 11-year-olds broadcast to schools across the UK and was a guest teacher at the Royal Ballet School's summer program.

In 2018 he gave masterclasses to vocational level students at the Royal Academy of Dance in London. and was appointed an ambassador of The Sydney Eisteddfod.

== Personal life ==
Campbell was awarded British Citizenship in 2013.

He was invited in 2010 to speak annually to the England and Wales Cricket Board as part of their Level Four Training for international cricket coaches. In 2015, he was invited to take part in the BBC program Test Match Special with an interview entitled, View from the Boundary.

Campbell was born with significant hearing loss and sometimes needed to wear hearing aids. Campbell says that when waiting to go on stage he sometimes relies on colleagues to give him his cues, but that once on stage he can usually hear the orchestra playing.

In 2018 Campbell was featured on ABC Television (Australia) in a documentary charting his early life and that of fellow Royal Ballet Principal, Steven McRae.

In 2022, Campbell married fellow Royal Ballet dancer Claire Calvert. They have a daughter, born in 2023.

== DVDs ==
Campbell can be seen dancing in the following productions:

=== Birmingham Royal Ballet ===
- Cinderella NVC Arts Warner Classics (2011) (Dancing Master)

=== Royal Ballet ===
- Romeo and Juliet Opus Arte (2013) (Mercutio)
- Ashton Celebration Opus Arte (2013) (Voices of Spring)
- Swan Lake. Opus Arte (2015) (Pas de Trois)
- Frankenstein Opus Arte. (2016) (Henry Clerval)
- The Nutcracker Opus Arte (2017) (Hans Peter/Nutcracker)
- Swan Lake Opus Arte (2018) (Benno)
- Within the Golden Hour Opus Arte (2020)
