= Jean-Marc Puissant =

International stage and costume designer

- Born: Jean-Marc Guy Maxime Puissant; 26 September 1969 (age 55); Grenoble, France
- Education: Conservatioire de Paris; Paris Opera Ballet School; La Sorbonne, University of Paris; Motley Theatre Design Course
- Awards: Prix Benois de la Danse nomination (2016); Aeternum (Royal Ballet) 2013 Laurence Olivier Awards & 2013 National Dance Awards; Jewels (Royal Ballet) 2008 Laurence Olivier Awards; Electric Counterpoint (Royal Ballet) 2008 National Dance Award; DGV: Danse à Grande Vitesse (Royal Ballet) 2007 Southbank Sky Arts Awards
- Website: www.jeanmarcpuissant.com

Jean-Marc Puissant (born 26 September 1969) is a stage and costume designer. curator and consultant for live arts and exhibitions. Based in London, Puissant collaborates with international brands, directors, choreographers and curators in the UK, USA, Europe, Australia and Japan.

== Early life and education ==
Puissant grew up in the village of Le Bourg-d'Oisans, in the French Alps.

He moved to Grenoble, age 12, to study at Lycée Stendhal and Conservatoire de Grenoble and to Paris, age 15, to study at Lycée Racine, Conservatoire de Paris and Paris Opera Ballet School.

Puissant studied Art History at La Sorbonne, Paris, and design at Motley Theatre Design Course, London.

Puissant guest tutored costume design at NYU's New York University Tisch School of the Arts and scenography and costume design London’s Royal Central School of Speech and Drama.

== Career ==
Puissant's career began as a professional dancer. He joined Birmingham Royal Ballet in September 1990, under the direction of Sir Peter Wright, and Stuttgart Ballet in February 1995, under the direction of Marcia Haydée. He danced and created roles classical and contemporary repertoires.

In 2002, Puissant's breakthrough came with Tryst, a ballet choreographed by Christopher Wheeldon's at The Royal Ballet. Wheeldon and Puissant have collaborated on 13 productions, with Wheeldon's saying of their collaboration that “He’s so willing to dare (..) He doesn’t ever go for the obvious, and he often pushes me to work that way with him. It’s not always obvious to the audience what’s going into his work, and I enjoy that a lot."

In 2007, Monica Mason commissioned Puissant new stage design for the Royal Opera House's first production of George Balanchine's Jewels. The production won two 2008 Laurence Olivier Awards, including Best New Dance Production. Judith Mackrell writes in The Guardian "The triumph of this new production is to transfer a sense of ownership to the Royal Ballet. Courtesy of designers Jean-Marc Puissant and Jennifer Tipton, the three plotless ballets that make up Jewels have been given an added theatrical resonance, which suits this company’s performing temperament".

Puissant also collaborated with choreographers Karole Armitage, Maina Gielgud, Marcia Haydée, Shobana Jeyasingh, Annie-B Parson, Arlene Phillips, Lee Blakeley, Arthur Pita and Alexander Whitley amongst others. In 2010, Puissant designed the stage design for David McVicar's Verdi's Aida at The Royal Opera.

In August 2019, Puissant curated a critically acclaimed program for New York’s Joyce Theater’s Festival.

== Recognition ==
- 2016 Benois de la Danse Nomination: Best Scenographer
- 2013 Laurence Olivier Awards: Winner Best New Dance Production for Aeternum. Royal Ballet
- 2008 Laurence Olivier Awards: Winner Best New Dance Production for Jewels, Royal Ballet
- 2007 Laurence Olivier Awards: Nomination Best New Dance Production for DGV: Danse à Grande Vitesse, Royal Ballet
- 2003 Laurence Olivier Awards: Nomination Best New Dance Production for Tryst, Royal Ballet
- 2013 National dance awards: Winner Best Classical Production for Aeternum, Royal Ballet
- 2008 National Dance Awards: Winner Best Classical Production for Electric Counterpoint, Royal Ballet
- 2007 South Bank Sky Arts Awards: Winner: Best New Dance Production for DGV: Danse à France Vitesse, Royal Ballet
- 2008 UK Theatre Awards: Nomination: Best Opera Production for A Night at the Chinese Opera, Scottish Opera

== Boards ==
2008–2020: Trustee - Dance Umbrella

2021 to present: Trustee - Dancers’ Career Development
