= Melissa Hamilton =

Northern Irish ballet dancer

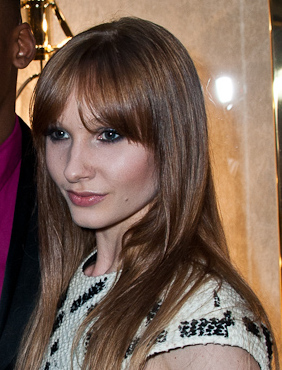
- Hamilton in 2014
- Born: 2 August 1989 (age 36); Belfast, Northern Ireland
- Occupation: Ballet dancer
- Years active: 2007-present
- Career
- Current group: The Royal Ballet
- Former groups: Dresden Semperoper Ballett

Melissa Hamilton (born 2 August 1989) is a Northern Irish ballet dancer and a principal dancer with the Royal Ballet, London.

== Early life ==
Hamilton was born in Belfast and spent most of her childhood in Dromore, County Down. Her father is a builder and her mother is a pre-school teacher. Her sister is an architect and her brother is a primary school teacher. She started dancing at age four. She attended Jennifer Bullick School of Dance in Lisburn, Dromore Primary School and Banbridge Academy, and left the latter after she finished her GCSEs. Until that point, the only training Hamilton had were once-a-week classes. At age 16, she was awarded a scholarship and entered Elmhurst Ballet School in Birmingham, where she trained for two years. During her first year, she was told she would not be able to catch up. However, in her second year, she was taught by Masha Mukhamedov (wife of Irek Mukhamedov), who believed she could have a career in dance. When Mukhamedovs moved to Athens, Hamilton followed them to train privately with Masha for 10 months.

== Career ==
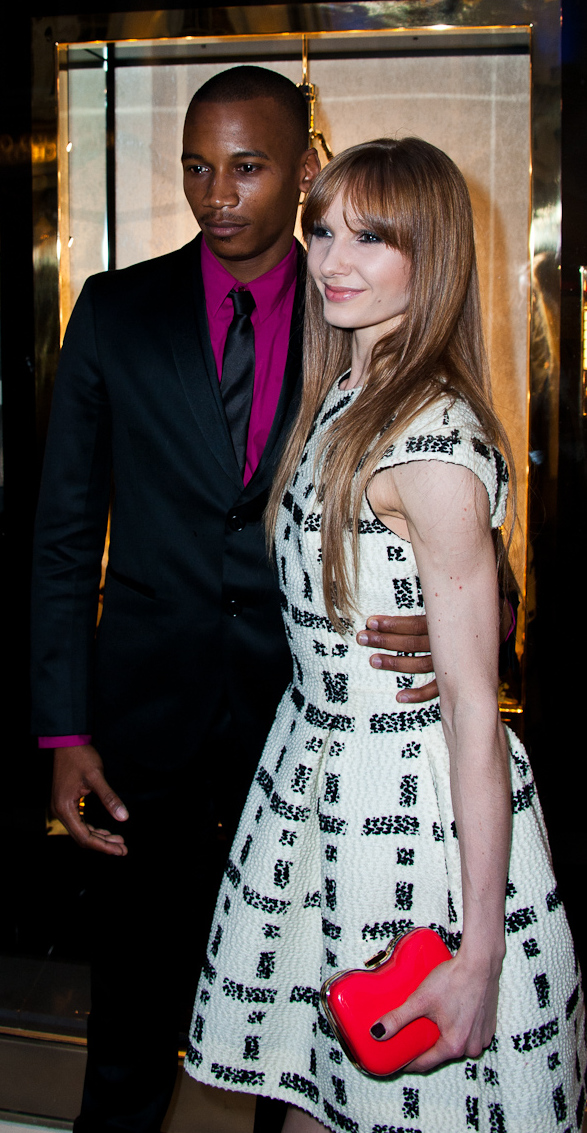
Hamilton with fellow Royal Ballet dancer Eric Underwood in 2014

In 2007, at age 18, she competed at the Youth America Grand Prix to “test the water”, but ended up winning the competition. The YAGP prize is joining ABT II, American Ballet Theatre's second company. However, Hamilton did not want to move to New York, so Mukhamedov contacted Monica Mason, then artistic director of The Royal Ballet, to let her know Hamilton would send her a video of her dancing. Hamilton was invited to take classes with the company, and offered a contract to join the company as an Artist within a week after her victory at YAGP. She joined the company in 2007. The following year, despite being in the corps, she originated a role for Wayne McGregor's Infra, and has frequently collaborated with McGregor since. She was soon cast in Kenneth MacMillan's works such as Juliet in Romeo and Juliet, the title role in Manon and Mary Vetsera in Mayerling. She was named First Artist in 2009, Soloist the following year, First Soloist in 2013.

After Dresden Semperoper Ballett's Jiri Bubenicek suggested to have Hamilton partner him for his farewell performance in Manon, the directors of Royal Ballet and Semperoper Ballett negotiated and agreed to let Hamilton take a leave of absence to join Semperoper Ballett as a principal dancer. She danced with the company during the 2015/16 and 2016/17 seasons. During her tenure in Dresden, she made several principal role debuts, including Nikiya in La Bayadere, Princess Aurora in The Sleeping Beauty and Odette/Odile in Swan Lake. She returned to The Royal Ballet in the 2017/18 season.

Hamilton has also performed internationally, including Roberto Bolle's Italy tour and Mikhailovsky Ballet's 85th anniversary in St Petersburg, partnering Bolle.

Writing of Hamilton's performance as Juliet in Kenneth MacMillan's Romeo and Juliet, The Observer's critic Luke Jennings wrote, "What really marks Hamilton out is the articulacy of her line. Here, she is all singing, expansive curves […] And if her acting can seem understated, it's never less than natural. In Act 3, she signals her unravelling with an immense weariness, and its final moments with a slow, sad unfurling of her arms."

In 2024, Hamilton was promoted to Principal Dancer.

Also in 2024, Hamilton and her husband Michael Christou founded Hamilton Christou Productions, to produce live dance performances in collaboration with other artists. Its inaugural production was Melissa Hamilton's International Ballet Stars Gala at the Esplanade Theatre, Singapore in March 2024, featuring dancers from the Royal Ballet, Norwegian National Ballet, Hamburg Ballet, Stuttgart Ballet and Singapore Ballet. Its first UK production was Melissa Hamilton's Grand Ballet Gala at the Grand Opera House, Belfast in October 2024, featuring dancers from the Royal Ballet, English National Ballet, Vienna State Ballet, New English Ballet Theatre and Ballet Ireland.

== Selected repertoire ==
Hamilton's repertoire with The Royal Ballet and Semperoper Ballett includes:

=== The Royal Ballet ===
- The title role in Manon
- Juliet in Romeo and Juliet
- Mary Vetsera in Mayerling
- Sugar Plum Fairy in The Nutcracker
- Queen of the Dryads in Don Quixote
- Olga in Onegin
- The Lilac Fairy and Princess Florine in The Sleeping Beauty
- Terpsichore in Apollo
- Bethana Waltz and Alaskan Rag in Elite Syncopations
- Symphonic Variations
- ‘Rubies’ from Jewels
- Agon
- Serenade
- The Concert
- The Judas Tree
- Song of the Earth

==== Created roles by Wayne McGregor ====
- Infra
- Yugen
- Woolf Works
- Limen
- Carbon Life
- Human Seasons
- Acis and Galatea

=== Semperoper Ballett ===
- Nikiya in La Bayadere
- Princess Aurora in The Sleeping Beauty
- Odette/Odile in Swan Lake
- The title role in Manon

== Personal life ==
Hamilton is married to Michael Christou, a property developer, interior designer and cofounder of a property development company called 1.61 London.

== Awards and other achievements ==
- Outstanding Female Performance (Classical) at the 2009 Critics’ Circle National Dance Awards, 2011
- Gold medal in the Eighth International Seoul Ballet Competition, 2011
- Allianz Arts and Cultural Brand Ambassador for Northern Ireland, 2013
