= Jillian Vanstone =

Canadian ballet dancer

- Born: 1980 or 1981 (age 44–45); Nanaimo, British Columbia, Canada
- Education: Canada's National Ballet School
- Years active: 1999-present
- Career
- Former groups: National Ballet of Canada

Jillian Vanstone is a Canadian ballet dancer. She joined the National Ballet of Canada in 1999, was promoted to principal dancer in 2011, and retired from performing in 2022.

== Early life ==
Vanstone was born and raised in Nanaimo, British Columbia. She started ballet at age six. At age 13, she moved to Toronto to train at Canada's National Ballet School.

== Career ==
Vanstone joined the National Ballet of Canada in 1999. In 2011, she was chosen by choreographer Christopher Wheeldon to dance the role of Alice in the North American premiere of Alice's Adventures in Wonderland. She won the Rolex Dancers First Award for that role. Later that year, she was promoted to principal dancer. She had danced Perdita in the North American premiere of The Winter's Tale and Stella in the Canadian premiere of A Streetcar Named Desire, and danced lead roles in productions such as La fille mal gardée, The Sleeping Beauty, Manon, Apollo, and works by Wheeldon, Guillaume Côté, Alexei Ratmansky, John Neumeier and Jerome Robbins. In 2019, she celebrated her 20th anniversary with the company after a performance of Giselle.

Vanstone retired from performing in 2022. Her final performance was in Wheeldon's After the Rain, which the company acquired especially for this occasion.

== Selected repertoire ==
Vanstone's repertoire with the National Ballet of Canada includes:

- The Dream
- Alice's Adventures in Wonderland
- A Streetcar Named Desire
- The Sleeping Beauty
- The Nutcracker
- Giselle
- Manon
- Onegin
- La fille mal gardée
- Nijinsky
- Jewels
- Symphony in C
- Theme and Variations
- Swan Lake
- A Month in the Country
- Apollo
- Pinocchio
- The Winter's Tale
- The Firebird
- Les Sylphides
- Paz de la Jolla

=== Originated roles ===
- Frame by Frame

== Awards ==
- 2011: Rolex Dancers First Award
