= Mayara Magri (dancer) =

Brazilian ballet dancer

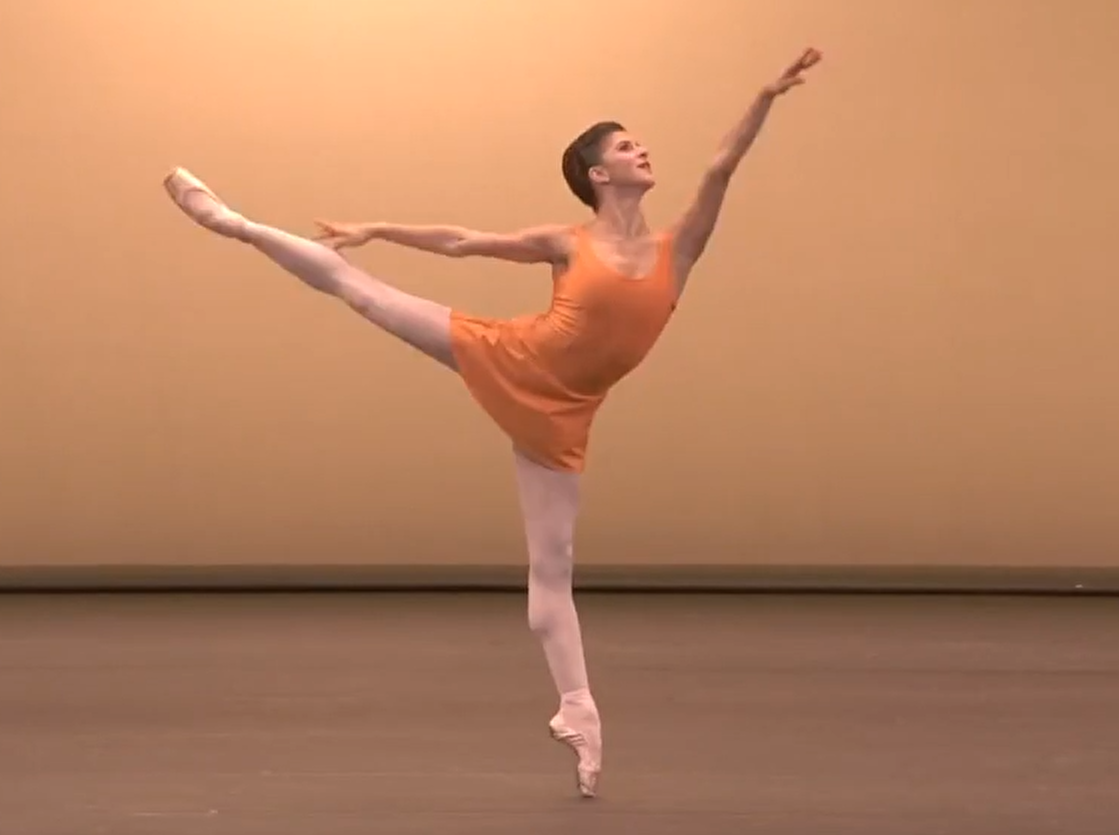
- Mayara Magri, 'Concerto' by Kenneth MacMillan
- Born: 1994 (age 31–32); Rio de Janeiro, Brazil
- Occupation: Ballet dancer
- Career
- Current group: The Royal Ballet
- Dances: Ballet

Mayara Magri (born 1994) is a Brazilian ballet dancer. She is a principal dancer at The Royal Ballet. Her promotion to principal dancer took effect in September 2021.

== Early life and training ==
Magri was born and raised in Rio de Janeiro, Brazil. When she was eight, she received a scholarship to train at Petite Danse School in Rio de Janeiro. When she was sixteen, she won the Senior Age Division of the Youth America Grand Prix and the Prix de Lausanne Scholarship and Audience Prize in 2011. Though her teachers encouraged her to train in the United States, she chose to go to The Royal Ballet School in London. Magri, who was trained in the Vaganova method, had to adjust to British ballet.

== Career ==
In 2012, at age 17, Magri was offered a contract to join the company. She was named First artist in 2015, Soloist in 2016, First Soloist in 2018 and Principal Dancer in 2021. She has danced roles such as Kitri in Don Quixote, Gamzatti in La Bayadere, Mitzi Caspar in Mayerling and Lescaut's Mistress in Manon. In June 2020, in the first series of performance since the Royal Opera House's closure due to the COVID-19 coronavirus pandemic, which was broadcast online, Magri and Matthew Ball performed an extract from Christopher Wheeldon's Within the Golden Hour, after learning the pas de deux in five days.

== Personal life ==
As of 2023, Magri lived off Holloway Road, north London, with her partner, fellow Royal Ballet principal Matthew Ball.

== Selected repertoire ==
Magri's repertoire with The Royal Ballet includes:

- Swanilda in Coppélia
- Juliet in Romeo and Juliet
- Kitri and Mercedes in Don Quixote
- Myrtha in Giselle
- Gypsy Girl in The Two Pigeons
- Lilac Fairy, Florestan’s Sister, Fairy of the Enchanted Garden and Fairy of the Woodland Glade in The Sleeping Beauty
- Tatiana in Anastasia
- Sugar Plum Fairy, Rose Fairy and Vivandière in The Nutcracker
- Handmaiden in Apollo
- Pas de trois in Swan Lake
- Mitzi Caspar in Mayerling
- Gamzatti in La Bayadere
- Lescaut's Mistress in Manon
- ‘Rubies’ from Jewels
- Woolf Works
- Within the Golden Hour
- Monotones I
- Symphonic Variations
- After the Rain

=== Created roles ===
- Multiverse
- Corybantic Games
- The Illustrated ‘Farewell’
- Rosaura in Like Water for Chocolate
