= Erdem Moralıoğlu =

Turkish British fashion designer (born 1977)

Erdem Moralıoğlu MBE
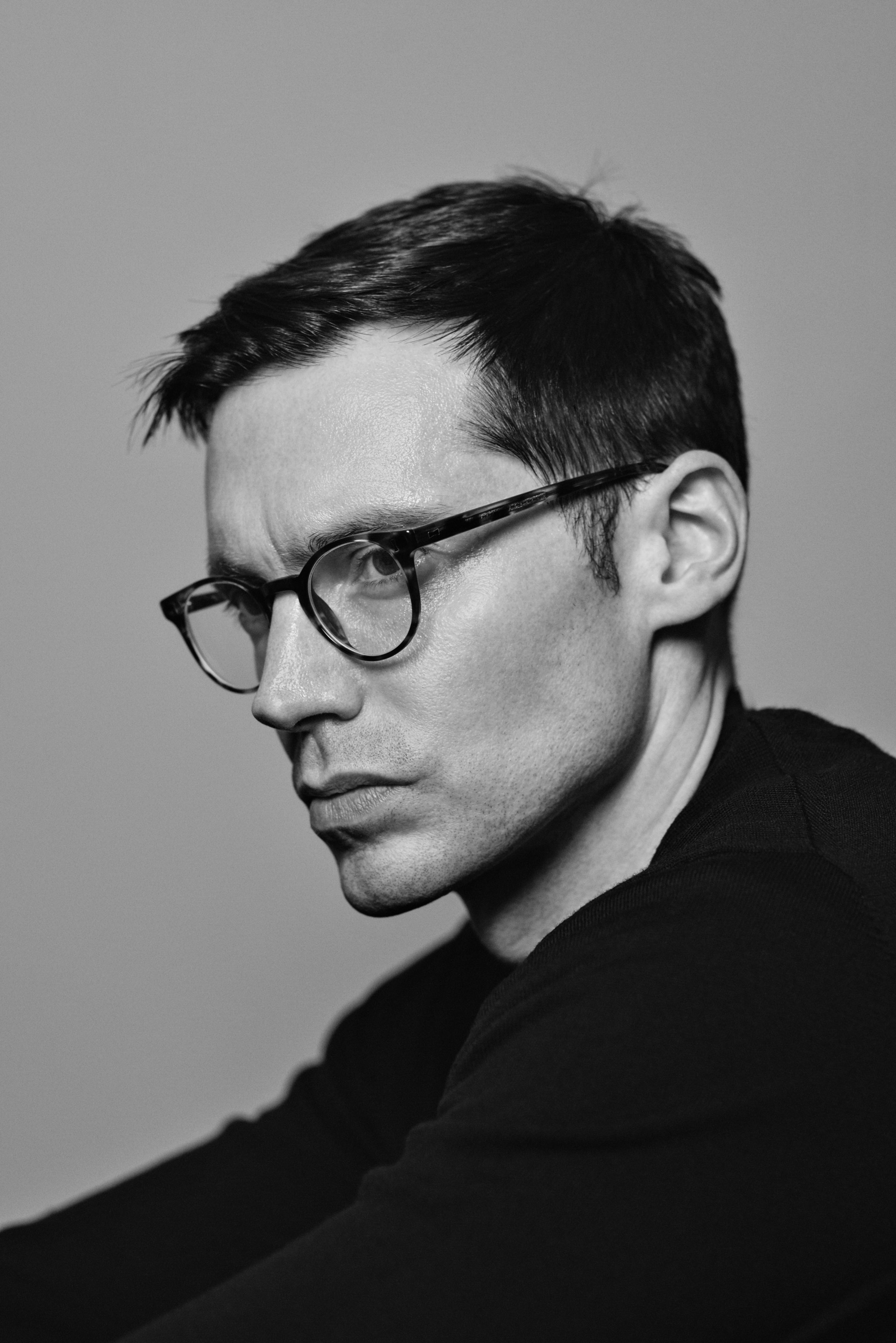
- Moralıoğlu portrait, 2019
- Born: November 1977 (age 48); Montreal, Canada
- Education: Marianopolis College
- Alma mater: Toronto Metropolitan University; Royal College of Arts
- Occupation: Fashion designer
- Years active: 2005 - present
- Organization: ERDEM London
- Website: https://erdem.com/

Erdem Moralıoğlu (born November 1977) is a creative director and founder of eponymous London-based fashion label Erdem, which he established in 2005.

== Early life and education ==
Moralıoğlu was born in Montreal, Quebec, Canada to a Turkish father, Erkal who was a chemical engineer and an English mother, Marlene Dawn (née Jeavons) who worked as a secretary. His parents met whilst working together in Geneva and his mother grew up between Montreal and Birmingham, England.

A graduate of Marianopolis College, Moralıoğlu earned a BA in Fashion from Ryerson Polytechnical Institute (now Toronto Metropolitan University) in Toronto and then interned for Vivienne Westwood. He moved to London in 2000 to do a Masters degree at the Royal College of Art on a Chevening Scholarship.

== Career ==
Moralıoğlu moved to New York City upon completing his Masters in 2003 to work at Diane von Fuerstenberg. In 2005, he returned to London to launch his own label, ERDEM.

In 2017, ERDEM collaborated with H&M, Moralıoğlu’s first collection for men; film director Baz Luhrmann created the visuals for the campaign.

In 2018, Moralıoğlu designed costumes for 24 ballet dancers performing in Christopher Wheeldon's Corybantic Games at the Royal Opera House in London.

In 2021, ERDEM expanded to designing menswear.

== Recognition ==
In 2007, Erdem won the Swarovski British Fashion Council Fashion Enterprise Award, and the British Fashion Council's Fashion Forward award in 2008.

In 2012, he won the 'New Establishment' award at the Fashion Awards. In 2013, he was awarded at the British Fashion Awards for 'Red Carpet Designer of the Year'.

Later, in 2014, Moralıoğlu was named the British Fashion Council’s Women’s Wear Designer of the Year. In 2017, he won International Canadian Designer of the Year at the Canadian Arts & Fashion Awards.

Moralıoğlu was appointed Member of the Order of the British Empire (MBE) in the 2020 Birthday Honours for services to fashion.

== Personal life ==
Moralıoğlu lives and operates a studio in Bethnal Green, east London. He has a twin sister. Since 2018, he has been married to architect Philip Joseph.

His mother, Marlene died in 2007 and his father, Erkal in 2001.
