= Robin Friend =

British-Australian photographer

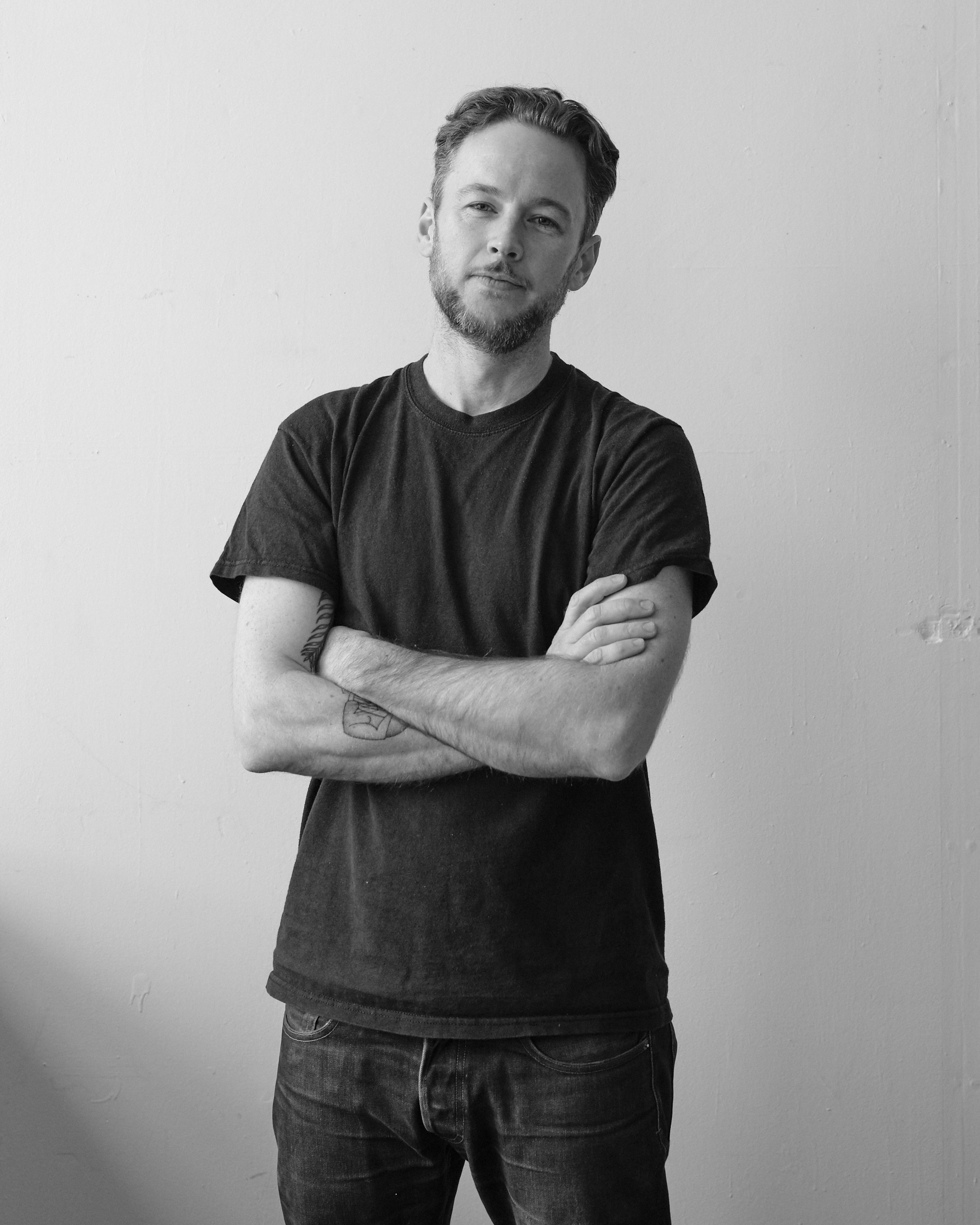
- Born: 1983 (age 42–43)
- Occupation: Photographer
- Website: robinfriend.co.uk

Robin Friend (born 1983) is a British-Australian photographer. His book Bastard Countryside (2018), brought together "15 years worth of exploration" the British Landscape with a large format view camera. Included in this publication by Loose Joints is an essay the landscape writer Robert Macfarlane.

== Life ==
Friend was born in London, UK, but from an early age lived in Melbourne, Australia. He returned to live in England permanently with this family when he was 14. He went on to study photography at the University of Plymouth and the Royal College of Art. He has two children with his partner Seren Colley and they live in the town of Lewes, East Sussex.

== Work ==
=== Bastard Countryside ===
Robin Friend's Bastard Countryside is an amalgamation of 15 years worth of work, journeying across the English countryside. Originally made for separate, unrelated projects, the pictures that make up this extensive body of work in time fused together to form this single, more expansive project. Published by Loose Joints in 2018. The title, Bastard Countryside, was a term first coined by French poet and novelist Victor Hugo in Les Misérables whilst describing the "city of Paris as an 'amphibian', stretching out into the countryside and devouring everything in its path", "somewhat ugly but bizarre, made up of two different natures."

The project deals with the idea of the collision of the human and non-human. Through the meticulous use of his 5x4 large format view camera the photographs "are given heightened effect through exaggerations of colour and composition, embodying a friction between British pastoral ideals and present reality." Within scenes that feel like traditional landscapes, our ideas of it are intruded, often by pollution, decay and WWII debris in this "mixed-up meeting-zone of rural and urban; where city frays into country."

Friend says "I see it almost as an anxious nature. We're all anxious about what the future holds and I feel like that is inherent in a lot of the pictures. I think that you couldn't be a human without being worried about the kind of planet we're leaving to our children."

=== Winged Bull in the Elephant Case ===
Winged Bull in the Elephant Case "is an immersive performance for the screen about preserving our cultural heritage in the face of violence and aggression." At the start of the Second World War, the National Gallery's art collection was buried in the Manod slate mines in Snowdonia for safe keeping. Winged Bull in the Elephant Case "dramatises the journey of a lost painting that takes human form, as it strives to get back to the gallery." This engaging piece combines various dance forms and was filmed underground in the National Gallery. The work features choreography by Wayne McGregor, Charlotte Edmonds, Botis Seva and Bonetics, performed by Company Wayne McGregor, Alessandra Ferri, Bonetics, and Far From The Norm. The production was written and directed by Robin Friend.

He had his first solo show at the National Gallery of London in 2018. It coincided with a film piece called Winged Bull in the Elephant Case he wrote and directed, as a collaboration with the choreographer Wayne McGregor. It told the story of the National Gallery during World War II when the galleries collection was hidden in a slate mine in North Wales. His ongoing project Bonfire Prayers explores what happens on Bonfire night in the town of Lewes, East Sussex. Commissions

In 2011 he photographed 120 artists for the Thames & Hudson book Sanctuary: British Artists and their Studios. The book was followed by Art Studio America in 2013, documenting the private worlds of 115 American living artists.

== Publications ==
Bastard Countryside ISBN 978-1-912719-04-4 – published by Loose Joints with an essay by Robert Macfarlane.

== Awards ==
- 2019 Emerging Photographer Fund Finalist
- 2018 Royal Photographic Society Environmental Bursary
- 2016 Syngenta Award, Open winner
- 2011 reGeneration Award
- 2009 The Photographers Gallery Award
- 2009 Winner, Merlin Entertainment/Tussaud's Award for Fine Art

== Exhibitions ==
=== Solo exhibitions ===
- 2018 Manod: The Nation's Treasure Caves, National Gallery, London

=== Group exhibitions ===
- 2020 Festival ImageSingulières, Sete
- 2019 The Summer Exhibition, Royal Academy of Arts, London
- 2019 Royal Photographic Society International Photography Exhibition 161, Bristol
- 2017 Syngenta Award, Somerset House, London
- 2016 The Summer Exhibition, Royal Academy of Arts, London
- 2015 Demimonde, Amberwood House, London
- 2015 The Summer Exhibition, Royal Academy of Arts, London
- 2015 London's Burning, ICA, London
- 2013 Rosphoto, Saint Petersburg
- 2013 With Sorrow Snare, solo show, Zero10, London
- 2012 Taylor Wessing, National Portrait Gallery, London
- 2012 Immortal Nature, Edel Assanti, London
- 2011 Ghosts & Nightmares, Historial de la Grande Guerre, Péronne
- 2011 reGeneration, Aperture Gallery, New York
- 2011 Spirit Level, Go Modern, London
- 2010 reGeneration, Musee de l'Elysee, Lausanne

== Collections ==
Friend's work is held in the:

- Martin Parr Foundation
- Eisler Foundation
