= Woolf Works =

2015 ballet by Wayne McGregor

- Choreographer: Wayne McGregor
- Music: Max Richter
- Premiere: 11 May 2015; Royal Opera House
- Original ballet company: The Royal Ballet
- Design: Moritz Junge; Ciguë; We Not I Wayne McGregor
- Created for: Alessandra Ferri
- Genre: Contemporary ballet

Woolf Works is a full-length contemporary ballet choreographed by Wayne McGregor, composed by Max Richter, and inspired by Virginia Woolf's novels, letters, essays and diaries. The premiere took place on 11 May 2015 at the Royal Opera House. It was McGregor's first full-length ballet for The Royal Ballet, and won the Laurence Olivier Award for Best New Dance Production.

== Production ==
External videos
- Woolf Works – Orlando pas de deux (Natalia Osipova, Edward Watson; The Royal Ballet), YouTube video

In the ballet, each act represent one of Woolf's novels. The three acts, titled "I now, I then", "Becomings" and "Tuesday" are inspired by Mrs. Dalloway, Orlando and The Waves respectively.

Alessandra Ferri, who was 52, was invited by McGregor to star in Woolf Works, as he believed her age was suitable for the role. Mara Galeazzi, a former principal dancer who left the company in 2013, was asked to cover for Ferri, though Galeazzi did not perform the role until 2017.

The music, composed by McGregor's frequent collaborator Max Richter, featured both classical and electronic sounds. A recording of Woolf reading her essay "On Craftsmanship" was used in "I now, I then." Actress Gillian Anderson provided a voice recording of reading Woolf's suicide note, which is played in the beginning of "Tuesday." The music was released as an album titled Three Worlds: Music from Woolf Works.

A 2017 revival was filmed and relayed in cinemas. The film was later broadcast by BBC 4 and released on a DVD. The Royal Opera House released the recording online in response to the impact of the 2019–20 coronavirus pandemic on the performing arts. In the first full company performance since the pandemic started, Edward Watson, Akane Takada and Calvin Richardson performed an excerpt from "I now, I then."

La Scala Theatre Ballet in Milan debuted Woolf Works in 2019. Ferri and Federico Bonelli, a Royal Ballet principal, reprised their roles from the original production.

Woolf Works made its North American debut on April 11, 2024 at Segerstrom Center for the Arts in Costa Mesa, California and was danced by American Ballet Theatre, Segerstrom's official dance company.

== Principal casts ==
- Original cast: Alessandra Ferri, Federico Bonelli, Edward Watson, Tristan Dyer, Beatriz Stix-Brunell, Francesca Hayward, Gary Avis, Sarah Lamb, Natalia Osipova, Melissa Hamilton, Akane Takada, Steven McRae, Paul Kay, Eric Underwood, Matthew Ball
- 2017 filmed version cast: Alessandra Ferri, Federico Bonelli, Edward Watson, Calvin Richardson, Beatriz Stix-Brunell, Francesca Hayward, Gary Avis, Sarah Lamb, Natalia Osipova, Akane Takada, Steven McRae, Paul Kay, Eric Underwood, Matthew Ball

== Awards and nominations ==
Year	Organisation	Award	Work	Result	Ref.
2015	Critics Circle National Dance Awards	Best Classical Choreography	Woolf Works	Won	
2015	Critics Circle National Dance Awards	Outstanding Female Performance (Classical)	Alessandra Ferri	Nominated	
2015	Critics Circle National Dance Awards	Grishko Award for Best Female Dancer	Alessandra Ferri	Won	
2016	Laurence Olivier Award	Best New Dance Production	Woolf Works	Won	
2016	Laurence Olivier Award	Outstanding Achievement in Dance	Alessandra Ferri (Note: Alessandra Ferri was awarded for both Woolf Works and Chéri)	Won	
