= Edward Watson (dancer) =

British ballet dancer

Edward Watson MBE (born 21 May 1976) is a British ballet dancer. He is a retired principal dancer and currently a coach with the Royal Ballet in London.

== Early years ==
Edward Watson was born in Bromley, Kent and was brought up in Dartford with his twin sister, Liz. He first attended dance classes at the age of 3, and was later accepted as a student at the Royal Ballet School, eventually joining the full-time school at White Lodge, Richmond Park. Whilst at the school, he trained with Anatoly Grigoriev, a former dancer of the Kirov Ballet and was one of six male students who graduated into the Upper School at the age of 16. At the Upper School his teachers included German Zammel and Julie Lincoln. Whilst training at the Upper School, Watson danced a number of roles:

- Checkmate by Ninette de Valois, 1993 (Role: Black Castle)
- Simple Symphony by Matthew Hart, 1993
- Monotones No. 2 by Frederick Ashton, 1994
- Napoli by August Bournonville, 2004 (Role: Pas de Six)

== Career ==
Watson graduated into The Royal Ballet in 1994 and was promoted to Principal in 2005. His repertory with the Company includes major roles in works by Frederick Ashton and Kenneth MacMillan. His many role creations for Wayne McGregor include in Symbiont(s), Qualia, Chroma, Infra, Limen, Carbon Life, Raven Girl, Tetractys, Woolf Works, Obsidian Tear and Multiverse, and for Christopher Wheeldon Lewis Carroll/The White Rabbit in Alice’s Adventures in Wonderland), Leontes in The Winter’s Tale and John Singer Sargent in Strapless. Watson has worked with numerous other choreographers, including Siobhan Davies, David Dawson, Javier de Frutos, Alastair Marriott, Cathy Marston, Ashley Page and Arthur Pita.

In August 2020, it was announced that Watson would retire following a performance of McGregor's The Dante Project. He has remained with the company as a coach. His official title is répétiteur to the principal dancers.

Watson has served on the advisory board of vildwerk., a nonprofit organization dedicated to inspiring conservation awareness through dance, since 2025. He also collaborated with Antonia Franceschi to create Asylum, which he performed solo at its world premiere during vildwerk.’s December 2025 season at the New York Live Arts. The work was also performed at the Ballet Icons Gala in London in February 2026 and the Uncaged festival in Bristol in May 2026.

== Awards ==
At the National Dance Awards in 2008, Watson won 'Best Male Dancer'. He also won the Olivier Award in 2012 for Outstanding Achievement in Dance for his performance as Gregor Samsa in Arthur Pita's interpretation of Franz Kafka's Metamorphorsis at the Linbury Studio. In 2015 he won Prix Benois de la Danse for his performance as Leontes in Christopher Wheeldon The Winter's Tale at the Royal Ballet.

== Honours ==
In the 2015 Birthday Honours, Watson was appointed a Member of the Order of the British Empire (MBE) for services to dance.
