= Akane Takada =

Japanese ballet dancer

- 高田 茜
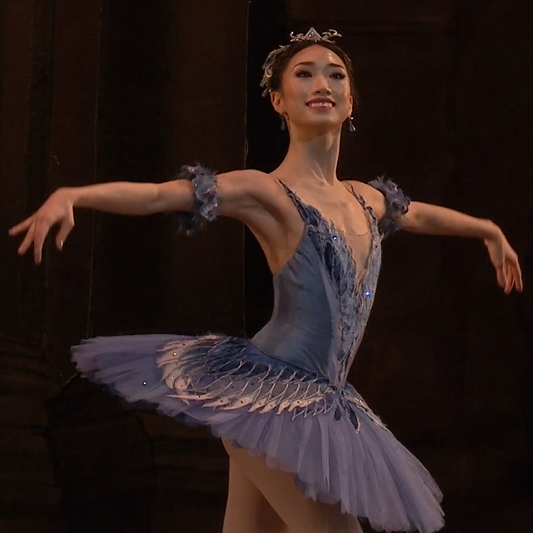
- Takada as Princess Florine in 2017
- Born: 18 April 1990 (age 35); Tokyo, Japan
- Occupation: Ballet dancer
- Years active: 2008–present

Akane Takada (高田 茜, Takada Akane; born 18 April 1990) is a Japanese ballerina and a principal dancer with the Royal Ballet in London. Her lead roles have included the title role in Giselle, Nikiya in La Bayadère, Kitri in Don Quixote, and Aurora in The Sleeping Beauty.

== Early life and education ==
Akane Takada was born 18 April 1990 in Tokyo. She is from the Higashishinkoiwa neighborhood in Katsushika, and began ballet training at the Hiromi Takahashi Ballet Studio in nearby Edogawa at the age of three. When she was twelve years old, a serious knee ligament injury dislocated her patella and interrupted her training for over a year while she physically grew enough to make corrective surgery possible. After winning a scholarship from ballet equipment company Chacott at the National Ballet Association competition, she studied at the Bolshoi Ballet Academy from 2006 to 2008, initially taking the classes for international dancers, but eventually joining the Russian classes. She won both a scholarship and an Audience Favorite prize at the Prix de Lausanne international ballet competition in 2008.

== Career ==
=== 2008–2015: Apprentice to first soloist ===
Takada joined the Royal Ballet as an apprentice in 2008, then as an artist in 2009. Choreographer Wayne McGregor cast her in his new 2009 ballet Limen. She also performed in a revival of the Frederick Ashton ballet Rhapsody, receiving praise from Sarah Crompton of The Telegraph for her performance as a soloist. Her performance as the Autumn fairy in Cinderella was less well-received, with Zoë Anderson of The Independent noting that "the risky, off-balance quality of the solo has gone missing". In 2011, she re-injured the same knee that she had injured when she was twelve years old, again interrupting her career. In the 2013 production of Onegin, Takada performed the role of Olga, providing "strong support" to the main dancers.

In 2014, Takada was promoted to first soloist. Writing for dance magazine DanceView, Jane Simpson contrasted Takada's less exciting performance as Princess Florine in The Sleeping Beauty to her more assertive performance as Aurora, calling Takada's dancing "clear and unornamented" and predicting future success. In December of that year, after dancing the role of Kitri in an afternoon performance of Don Quixote, Takada stepped into the lead role that evening as a mid-performance substitute for Natalia Osipova, who had been injured during the first act. Her performance was praised by Zoë Anderson in The Independent, with the critic observing that Takada's qualities suited "Kitri's mischievous nature". As a first soloist Takada also danced the principal role in Frederick Ashton's The Two Pigeons in 2015.

=== 2016–present: Principal dancer ===
Takada was promoted to principal dancer in 2016 at the age of 26. Vogue Japan named her one of its 2016 Women of the Year. Takada debuted in the lead role in Giselle later that year alongside Thiago Soares, with Clement Crisp of the Financial Times describing her as a "Giselle of subtle power". Takada paired with Steven McRae to dance the roles of Titania and Oberon in the Frederick Ashton ballet The Dream in 2017, with Judith Mackrell of The Guardian commending the pair for their footwork and their distinctively dark portrayal of the characters. Takada performed in another Wayne McGregor piece, titled Infra, in 2018, but her performance was criticized for lacking emotional power and weight despite its technical quality. Later that year, as Nikiya in a production of La Bayadère, Takada again danced with McRae, drawing praise from Laura Freeman of The Spectator for her "air of otherworldly detachment and exquisite lightness of line" but criticism for an ineffective pairing.

Writing for the Evening Standard, Emma Byrne described Takada in 2019 as "one of the Royal’s most elegant dancers". Takada missed the Royal Ballet's 2019 summer tour of Japan, in which she was scheduled to perform the role of Kitri in the Japanese premiere of Don Quixote, due to injury. In November 2019, during a performance of The Sleeping Beauty, Takada was injured during the first act, and was replaced in the rest of the performance by Yasmine Naghdi.

== Recognition ==
- 2008: Prix de Lausanne scholarship, Audience Favorite prize
- 2022: Dance Critics Society of Japan Award
