= Within the Golden Hour =

Ballet by Christopher Wheeldon

- Choreographer: Christopher Wheeldon
- Music: Ezio Bosso; Antonio Vivaldi
- Premiere: 2008; War Memorial Opera House
- Original ballet company: San Francisco Ballet
- Design: Jasper Conran
- Genre: Contemporary ballet

Within the Golden Hour is a one-act contemporary ballet choreographed by Christopher Wheeldon, composed by Ezio Bosso and featured music by Antonio Vivaldi. The ballet premiered in 2008 at the War Memorial Opera House, danced by the San Francisco Ballet.

== Production ==
External videos
- Within The Golden Hour – Christopher Wheeldon (Sarah Lamb, Alexander Campbell; The Royal Ballet), YouTube video
- Within The Golden Hour quartet – Christopher Wheeldon (The Royal Ballet), YouTube video

Within the Golden Hour was created as part of San Francisco Ballet's New Work Festival, which commissioned 10 choreographers to create works for the company. It is performed by 14 dancers, including three main couples, originated by Sarah Van Patten, Pierre-François Vilanoba, Maria Kochetkova, Joan Boada, Katita Waldo and Damian Smith.

In 2016, The Royal Ballet in London performed Within the Golden Hour for the first time, featuring Beatriz Stix-Brunell, Vadim Muntagirov, Lauren Cuthbertson, Matthew Golding, Sarah Lamb and Steven McRae. A 2019 revival, also danced by The Royal Ballet, was filmed and released on a DVD, with Stix-Brunell, Muntagirov, Lamb, Francesca Hayward, Valentino Zucchetti and Alexander Campbell.

In June 2020, in the first series of performance since the Royal Opera House's closure due to the 2019-20 coronavirus pandemic, which was broadcast online, dancers Mayara Magri and Matthew Ball performed a pas de deux from Within the Golden Hour, after learning it in five days. The performance was dedicated to Bosso, who died in May that year. In October that year, in Royal Ballet's first full company performance since the pandemic, the finale of Within the Golden Hour was performed.
