= The Winter's Tale (ballet) =

2014 ballet in three acts choreographed by Christopher Wheeldon

- Choreographer: Christopher Wheeldon
- Music: Joby Talbot
- Based on: The Winter's Tale by William Shakespeare
- Premiere: 10 April 2014; Royal Opera House
- Original ballet company: The Royal Ballet
- Design: Bob Crowley

The Winter's Tale is a ballet in three acts choreographed by Christopher Wheeldon to a commissioned score by Joby Talbot. The ballet is based on the play of the same name by William Shakespeare. With scenery and costumes designed by Bob Crowley, lighting designed by Natasha Katz, and special stage effects designed by Daniel Brodie and Basil Twist, it was a co-production of the Royal Ballet and the National Ballet of Canada. It was first presented at the Royal Opera House, London, on 10 April 2014. The North American premiere occurred the following year.

== Background ==
Wheeldon's ballet is a dance version of William Shakespeare's play The Winter's Tale (1609–11), considered by scholars one of his "problem plays," difficult to classify as tragedy, comedy, romance, or a combination of all three. The first three of its five acts are filled with intense psychological drama; the last two are lighthearted and comedic, concluding with a happy ending. It tells a complicated story of jealousy, loss, love, joy, redemption, forgiveness, and reconciliation. Shakespeare chose his title to signify to his audiences that the play was like a tale told in company gathered by a fireside on a winter's evening. A fictional invention—not true, but entertaining and morally instructive.

== The story ==
Leontes, king of Sicilia, is possessed by a mad jealousy, believing that his pregnant wife Hermione is having an affair with his childhood friend Polixenes, king of Bohemia. He orders that Hermione's infant daughter be abandoned. Hermione and their young son Mamillius die of distress, and Leontes is overcome with remorse. The baby is found by a shepherd in Bohemia and named Perdita ("the lost one"). Sixteen years pass. Perdita falls in love with Florizel, son of Polixenes, who returns her affections and proposed marriage. Polixenes is outraged that his princely son intends to marry a commoner and is consumed by fury. Florizel and Perdita, pursued by Polixenes, seek refuge in Sicilia at the court of Leontes. Perdita is recognized, Hermione returns from the dead, and the family is reunited.

== Casts ==
Role	Character Description	World premiere	North American premiere
King Leontes	King of Sicilia	Edward Watson	Piotr Stanczyk
Queen Hermione	Queen of Sicilia, Leontes' wife	Lauren Cuthbertson	Hannah Fischer
King Polixenes	King of Bohemia	Federico Bonelli	Harrison James
Paulina	Hermione's lady in waiting	Zenaida Yanowsky	Xiao Nan Yu
Princess Perdita	Leontes's and Hermione's daughter	Sarah Lamb	Jillian Vanstone
Prince Florizel	Polixenes's son	Steven McRae	Naoya Ebe
Antigonus	Paulina's husband	Bennet Gartside	
Mamillius	Leontes's and Hermione's son	Joe Parker	
Polixenes' Steward	Polixenes' servant	Thomas Whitehead	
Father Shepherd	Perdita's adoptive father	Gary Avis	
Brother Clown	Perdita's adoptive brother	Valentino Zucchetti	
Young Shepherdess	Brother Clown's girlfriend	Beatriz Stix-Brunell	

== Critical reception ==
Upon its world premiere at the Royal Opera House, The Winter's Tale was well received by dance critics. Judith Mackrell of The Guardian gave the ballet four out of five stars and praised the ballet as "one of most fully achieved story ballets to be created at the Royal in years." Writing for the Financial Times, Clement Crisp also awarded the ballet four out of five stars and highlighted the individual performances of the lead dancers. Luke Jennings, writing in The Guardian, said that the ballet, although dramatically flawed, was "for the most part a ravishing success" and was definitely "a ballet to keep."

== Videography ==
A performance by the original cast can be seen on Opus Arte DVD 1156D. Directed for the screen by Ross MacGibbon, it was recorded at the Royal Opera House, Covent Garden, in 2014. In light of the impact of the COVID-19 pandemic on the performing arts, the recording was released online.
