= Rambert =

Rambert is a surname. Notable people with the surname include:

- Ángel Rambert (1936–1983), Argentine-born French footballer
- Eugène Rambert (1830–1886), Swiss author and poet
- Marie Rambert (1888–1982), Polish-born dancer and pedagogue
- Pascal Rambert (born 1962), French writer, choreographer and director for the stage and screen
- Pep Rambert (1916–1974), American baseball pitcher
- Sebastián Rambert (born 1974), Argentine footballer

See also

- Rambert Dance Company, British dance company
- Canton of Saint-Just-Saint-Rambert, French administrative division
- Gare de Saint-Rambert-en-Bugey, railway station in France
- Saint-Rambert-d'Albon, commune in the Drôme department in southeastern France
- Saint-Just-Saint-Rambert, commune in the Loire department in central France
