= Shirin Guild =

Indian-born English fashion designer (born 1946)

- شیرین گیلد
- Born: Shirin Zafar; 1946 (age 78–79); Iran
- Education: Saint Martin's School of Art
- Occupations: Fashion designer, costume designer
- Known for: Apparel design, fashion label
- Movement: Minimalism
- Spouse: Robin Guild (m. 1985–2006; death)

Shirin Guild (Persian: شیرین گیلد; née Shirin Zafar; born 1946) is an Iranian-born British fashion designer. Her fashion label was established in London, in 1991. Her clothing design is minimalist and she has reworked Iranian clothing traditions through a "reductionist aesthetic". Her design work has been described as "trans-cultural".

== Early life and education ==
Shirin Guild was born in 1946 and grew up in Iran. Prior to the 1979 revolution, she moved to Los Angeles where she remained during the early 1980s. Her early interest with fashion came from layering with Iranian tribal apparel. Comme des Garcons and other Japanese designers of the 1970s and 1980s had an early career impact, which inspired her to start designing.

She eventually moved to Belgravia in London. Apart from two years of tuition from the London Saint Martin's School of Art, in her youth, Shirin Guild is a self-taught fashion designer.

== Career ==
The Shirin Guild label was launched in 1991 by Shirin and her husband, the interior decorator Robin Guild.

Guild's designs were originally inspired by Iranian traditional clothes shapes, with a more boxy and layered look. She had an "Abba coat" similar to a style worn by holy men in Iran and a "Kurdish"–style pant. She was initially known for oversize, square-shaped patterns, designed to take form on the feminine body. i

Guild is renowned for utilising unconventional materials and manufacturing technologies, which she combines with traditional fabrics and craftsmanship. Guild's innovative, minimalistic garments are made of uniquely devised fabrics, based on yarns made from cashmere, silk, linen, wool, cotton, stainless steel, copper, hemp, bamboo, pineapple and even paper, or combinations thereof.

The globalization of fashion started in the 1970s, and with it saw the first emergence of fashion designers that were not of European-origins selling in Western markets. Other leading fashion designers of her generation with non-European origins include Hanae Mori, Issey Miyake, Yohji Yamamoto, Hussein Chalayan, Rifat Ozbek, Azzedine Alaia, Vivienne Tam, Eskandar, among others.

Guild's work is widely mentioned in the media, as well as in academic publications. Her creations of the label have been selected for museum collections, including at the Victoria and Albert Museum in London.

== See also ==
- List of Iranian artists
