= Wayne McGregor =

British choreographer and director (born 1970)

Professor Sir Wayne McGregor CBE
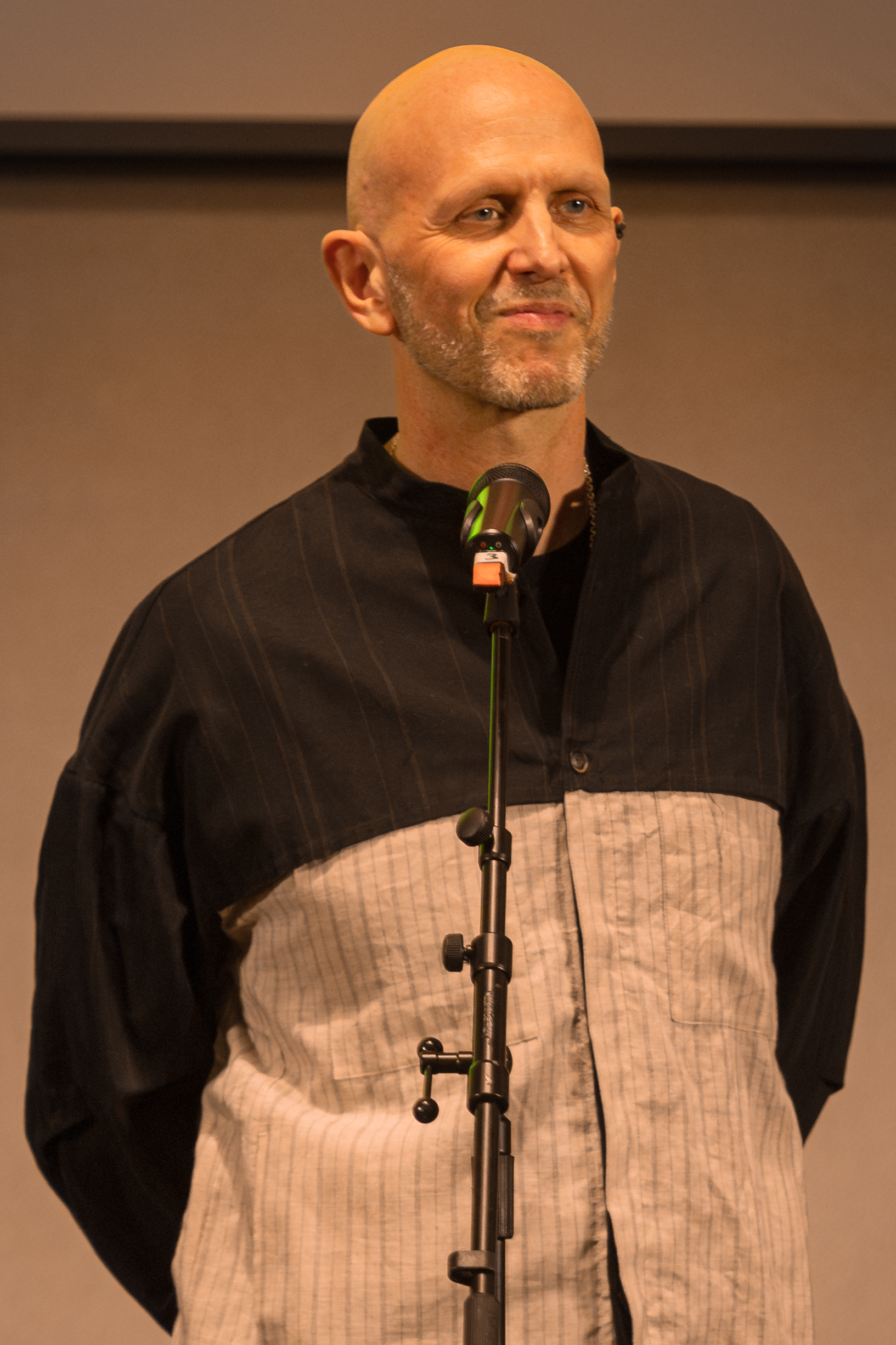
- McGregor in 2025
- Born: 12 March 1970 (age 56); Stockport, England
- Occupations: Choreographer; director

Sir Wayne McGregor, CBE (born 12 March 1970) is a British choreographer and director who has won multiple awards. He is the Artistic Director of Studio Wayne McGregor and Resident Choreographer of The Royal Ballet.

== Biography ==
McGregor was born in Stockport in 1970. He studied dance at Bretton Hall College of the University of Leeds and in New York. In 1992 he was appointed Choreographer-in-Residence at The Place, London, and in the same year he founded his own company, Random Dance (now Company Wayne McGregor). Company Wayne McGregor was invited to be the first Resident Company at the new Sadler's Wells in 2002. Appointed in 2006, McGregor is the first Resident Choreographer of The Royal Ballet from a contemporary dance background. In 2021, McGregor was announced as the Director of Dance for the Venice Biennale until 2024. McGregor is Professor of Choreography at Trinity Laban Conservatoire of Music and Dance and holds an Honorary Doctor of Science degree from Plymouth University as well as an Honorary Doctor of Letters from University of Leeds and University of Chester. McGregor also holds an Honorary Doctor from University of the Arts London. He is part of the Circle of Cultural Fellows at King's College London. In 2017 he was awarded an Honorary Fellowship of the British Science Association. McGregor topped the list for dance in The Progress 1000 celebration of London's most influential people in 2018. In 2021 McGregor was honoured with a Lifetime Achievement Award at the Prix de Lausanne.

== Career ==
Founded in 1992 (formerly known as Random Dance Company and Wayne McGregor | Random Dance), Studio Wayne McGregor encompasses McGregor's touring company of dancers, Company Wayne McGregor, and all of McGregor's creative work in dance, film, theatre, opera, fashion, technology, and TV. Studio Wayne McGregor also leads extensive learning and engagement projects nationally and internationally, artist development initiatives, and research and development work with science and technology partners. Significant large-scale engagement projects include Big Dance in Trafalgar Square as part of the 2012 London Olympics, and LightLens for Aarhus European City of Culture in 2017.

McGregor has made over 30 works for Company Wayne McGregor (including A Body for Harnasie, UniVerse: A Dark Crystal Odyssey, Autobiography, Tree of Codes, Atomos, FAR and Entity), and over 20 works for The Royal Ballet (including The Dante Project, Yugen, Obsidian Tear, Woolf Works, Carbon Life, Infra and Chroma).

He also regularly creates new work for international companies including National Ballet of Canada (MADDADDAM), La Scala Theatre Ballet (LORE), Paris Opera Ballet (Genus, L'Anatomie de la Sensation, Alea Sands), Bayerisches Staatsballett Munich (Sunyata), American Ballet Theatre (AfteRite, a co-production with Royal Danish Ballet), San Francisco Ballet (Borderlands), Stuttgart Ballet (EDEN | EDEN, Yantra), New York City Ballet (Outlier), The Australian Ballet (Dyad 1929), Ballett Zürich (Kairos) and Rambert (PreSentient), and has works in the repertories of companies including Bolshoi Ballet (Chroma), Mariinsky Ballet (Infra) and Alvin Ailey American Dance Theater (Chroma and Kairos).

McGregor has worked on choreography and movement direction for numerous feature films and documentaries including Harry Potter and the Goblet of Fire, The Legend of Tarzan, Fantastic Beasts and Where to Find Them, Sing, Mary Queen of Scots and Audrey as well as choreographing music videos for Radiohead (Lotus Flower), Atoms for Peace (Ingenue) and The Chemical Brothers (Wide Open). He has also worked on numerous fashion and TV works and projects including choreography for Paloma Faith's performance at the 2015 Brit Awards as well as directing and choreographing the opening sequence for the award show in 2016, collaborating with Gareth Pugh for his London and New York Fashion weeks in 2014 and 2017 respectively, and fashion films Soma for COS and Torus for SHOWstudio. In 2016, McGregor directed and choreographed Selfridges' everyBODY advertising campaign.

McGregor has directed opera (Dido and Aeneas and Acis and Galatea for La Scala/Royal Opera), and choreographed for theatre (productions at ENO, Old Vic, National Theatre and Donmar Warehouse). In 2022 he choreographed ABBA Voyage, a concert featuring virtual avatars of pop band ABBA depicting the group as they appeared in 1977.

McGregor has collaborated with composers (Thomas Adès, Jlin, John Tavener, Mark-Anthony Turnage, Kaija Saariaho, Jon Hopkins, Max Richter, Joby Talbot/The White Stripes, Rokia Traore, Steve Reich, Jamie xx, Scanner), visual artists and designers (Thierry Mugler, Tacita Dean, Lucy Carter, Edmund de Waal, Random International, Olafur Eliasson, Ben Cullen Williams, Mark Wallinger, Vicki Mortimer, Aitor Throup, Shirin Guild, The OpenEnded Group), filmmakers and photographers (Ravi Deepres, Ruth Hogben, Nick Knight, Robin Friend), architects (We Not I, John Pawson), and writers (Margaret Atwood, Audrey Niffenegger, Uzma Hameed).

Studio Wayne McGregor's building opened at Here East on Queen Elizabeth Olympic Park in March 2017. Designed by architectural practice We Not I, the creative arts space for making contains three large dance studios, meeting and collaboration spaces. It also features artwork installations by Haroon Mirza, Carmen Herrera, a work by artist Ben Cullen Williams, original artworks by We Not I based on Josef Albers' Structural Constellations and Homages to the Square, and Anni Albers' Study for Camino Real, with permission from The Josef and Anni Albers Foundation.

In 2026, McGregor was awarded the Outstanding Contribution to Dance Award at the 2026 Laurence Olivier Awards.

== Credits ==
=== Dance ===
- A Body for Harnasie for NOSPR, LPO and Company Wayne McGregor (2024)
- Herrera Codes for The Royal Ballet (2023)
- Untitled, 2023 for The Royal Ballet (2023)
- UniVerse: A Dark Crystal Odyssey for Company Wayne McGregor (2023)
- Novacene for National Youth Dance Company (2023)
- MADDADDAM for National Ballet of Canada (2022)
- LORE for Teatro alla Scala (2022)
- ABBA Voyage (2022)
- The Dante Project for The Royal Ballet (2021)
- A Dance Response to In Memoriam for Culture Weston (2021)
- No One is an Island for Studio Wayne McGregor, Random International and BMW i (2020/1)
- Morgen for The Royal Ballet (2020)
- McGREGOR + MUGLER for MuzArts (2019)
- Kinds of Life for Random International and Company Wayne McGregor (2019)
- Living Archive: An AI Performance Experiment for Company Wayne McGregor (2019)
- Noye's Fludde for English National Opera and Stratford East (2019)
- Bach Forms for Company Wayne McGregor and The Royal Ballet (2018)
- AfteRite for American Ballet Theatre (2018)
- Sunyata for Bayerisches Staatsballett, Munich (2018)
- Yugen for The Royal Ballet (2018)
- In Residence: Haroon Mirza Exhibition at Zabludowicz Collection (2017)
- Autobiography Edits for Company Wayne McGregor and Jlin (2017)
- Mix the Body for British Council (2017)
- Autobiography for Company Wayne McGregor (2017)
- Home Turf for Sadler's Wells / West Ham United Foundation (2017)
- +/- Human for Company Wayne McGregor and The Royal Ballet (2017)
- LightLens for Aarhus Capital of Culture (2017)
- Multiverse for The Royal Ballet (2016)
- Witness for Fall for Dance Festival (2016)
- Self and Other for Random International and Company Wayne McGregor (2016)
- Obsidian Tear for The Royal Ballet (2016)
- Ice Watch for Studio Olafur Eliasson (2015/8)
- Alea Sands for Paris Opera Ballet (2015)
- Tree of Codes for Company Wayne McGregor and Paris Opera Ballet (2015)
- Woolf Works for The Royal Ballet (2015)
- Random Raw for Mercury Theatre (2015)
- Kairos for Ballett Zürich (2014)
- Tetractys – The Art of Fugue for The Royal Ballet (2014)
- Scavenger for Company Wayne McGregor (2013)
- Atomos for Company Wayne McGregor (2013)
- Azimuth for Company Wayne McGregor (2013)
- Raven Girl for The Royal Ballet (2013)
- Borderlands for San Francisco Ballet (2013)
- Rain Room for Random International and Company Wayne McGregor (2012)
- Ambar for The Royal Ballet (2012)
- Big Dance Trafalgar Square 2012 for Big Dance (2012)
- Machina for Metamorphosis: Titian 2012 for The Royal Ballet (2012)
- Future Self for Random International and Company Wayne McGregor (2012)
- Carbon Life for The Royal Ballet (2012)
- UNDANCE for Company Wayne McGregor (2011)
- Tiny Dancer for Elton John's Million Dollar Piano at Caesar's Palace (2011)
- Blink for McMc Arts (2011)
- Infinite Freedom Exercise (near Adaban, Iran) for John Gerrard / Manchester International Festival (2011)
- L'Anatomie de la Sensation (Pour Francis Bacon) for Paris Opera Ballet (2011)
- Sum of Parts for Sadler's Wells (2011)
- Live Fire Exercise for The Royal Ballet (2011)
- Soma for Find Your Talent / Jarrow School (2011)
- FAR for Company Wayne McGregor (2010)
- Yantra for Stuttgart Ballet (2010)
- Outlier for New York City Ballet (2010)
- Stairwell for OpenEndedGroup / Hayward Gallery (2010)
- Limen for The Royal Ballet (2009)
- Dyad 1909 for Company Wayne McGregor (2009)
- Dyad 1929 for The Australian Ballet (2009)
- FINA World Swimming Championships: Opening Ceremony (2009)
- Infra for The Royal Ballet (2008)
- Renature for Nederlands Dans Theater (NDT1) (2008)
- SENSE for Endeavour House (2008)
- Entity for Company Wayne McGregor (2008)
- Nimbus for The Royal Ballet (2007)
- Genus for Paris Opera Ballet (2007)
- Untold for Yorkshire Dance (2007)
- [memeri] for D.A.N.C.E. (2007)
- Chroma for The Royal Ballet (2006)
- Erazor for Company Wayne McGregor (2006)
- Skindex for Nederlands Dans Theater (NDT1) (2006)
- Ossein for Company Wayne McGregor (2006)
- Amu@Durham for Company Wayne McGregor at Durham Cathedral (2006)
- Amu for Company Wayne McGregor (2005)
- Engram for the Royal Ballet (2005)
- EDEN | EDEN for Stuttgart Ballet (2005)
- Dragonfly for National Glass Centre, Sunderland (2004)
- AtaXia for Company Wayne McGregor (2004)
- Series for Company Wayne McGregor at Houses of Parliament, London (2004)
- Qualia for The Royal Ballet (2003)
- Polar Sequences 3 for Company Wayne McGregor (2003)
- Binocular for Adam Cooper Dance Company (2003)
- 2Human for English National Ballet (2003)
- Alpha for Company Wayne McGregor (2003)
- Xenathra for Wayne McGregor, Dance Umbrella (2003)
- Nautilus for Stuttgart Ballet (2003)
- Bio-Logical for BodyCraze, Selfridges London/Manchester (2003)
- ICE Floe for Trinity Laban and Greenwich Dance Agency (2002)
- PreSentient for Rambert Dance Company (2002)
- Game of Halves for National Youth Dance Wales (2002)
- BodyScript for Sadler's Wells (2002)
- Nemesis for Company Wayne McGregor (2002)
- Phase Space for the Gothenburg Ballet and Company Wayne McGregor (2002)
- L.O.V.E for Imagination Frankfurt (2002)
- HIVE for National Youth Dance Wales (2001)
- CastleScape for East London Dance (2001)
- detritus for Rambert Dance Company (2001)
- Codex for First Class Air Male - Dance East (2001)
- brainstate for Company Wayne McGregor and The Royal Ballet (2001)
- digit01 for Company Wayne McGregor (2001)
- 11 digital mantras for The Roundhouse London (2001)
- n-body for Kerry Nicholls Dance Company (2001)
- Velociraptor for Dance East/Bury Festival (2001)
- The Trilogy Installation for Greenwich Dance Agency (2000)
- Telenoia for Canary Wharf Arts and Events (2000)
- The Field for East London Dance/Greenwich+Docklands International Festival (2000)
- Symbiont(s) for The Royal Ballet (2001)
- net/work Narrative(s) for South East Dance/Brighton International Festival (2000)
- The Square Root of Ark for The Hammersmith and Fulham Arts Team (2000)
- Aeon for Company Wayne McGregor (2000)
- After Pneuma for David Hughes Company (2000)
- A Fleur de Peau for Viviana Durante, The Royal Ballet (2000)
- Equation for the Centre Georges Pompidou, Paris (1999)
- Zero Hertz for Cork Opera House, Ireland (1999)
- A Trial by Video for Melbourne International Festival (1998)
- INTER:ACTION (Bruce Nauman exhibition) for the Hayward Gallery, London (1998)
- Intertense for Shobana Jeyasingh Dance Company (1998)
- Sulphur 16 for Company Wayne McGregor (1998)
- Angel for the Natural History Museum, London (1998)
- Scottish Opera/Random Collaboration for the Gallery of Modern Art, Glasgow (1998)
- Pointe for the Saatchi Gallery, London (1997)
- The Millennarium for Company Wayne McGregor (1997)
- Neurotransmission for Snape Maltings Concert Hall, Aldeburgh (1997)
- Encoder for Shobana Jeyasingh's Away Game (1997)
- 53 Bytes in a Movement for Le Groupe de la Place Royale, Ottawa (1997)
- Skinned Prey for 4D (London Contemporary Dance School) (1997)
- x2 for the Royal Museum, Edinburgh (1997)
- Chameleon for the Barbican Centre, London (1997)
- Black on White for the South Bank Centre Ballroom, London (1997)
- S.I.N. for Shed O, London Docklands (1997)
- Bach Suite for Crusaid Gala (Olivier Theatre, RNT) (1996)
- Ventolin for West Yorkshire Playhouse (1996)
- Esc...otherspace for Birmingham Royal Ballet (1996)
- 8 Legs of the Devil for Company Wayne McGregor (1996)
- Urban Savage for Ricochet Dance Company (1996)
- Medusa for Olympic Ballet Company, Milan (1996)
- Vulture (Reverse Effect) commissioned by Cultural Industry (1996)
- Cybergeneration for the Belfast International Festival at Queens (1996)
- Time Lines for alt.dance: LeedsDance96 Festival (1996)
- Slam for The Arches, Glasgow (1996)
- Dragonfly for the Alternative Hair Show, Drury Lane (1995)
- CeBit Dances for Imagination/Ericsson, Hanover (1995)
- Cyborg for Company Wayne McGregor (1995)
- Jacob's Membrane for Company Wayne McGregor (1995)
- For Bruising Archangel for Company Wayne McGregor (1995)
- AnArkos for Company Wayne McGregor (1995)
- sever for Company Wayne McGregor (1994/5)
- 9.7 recurring 2%Black for National Youth Dance Company (1994)
- Artificial Intelligence for National Youth Dance Company (1994)
- Cyberdream for The Boys Project, The Place (1994)
- White Out for The Boys Project, The Place (1994)
- Vulcan for Swindon Youth Dance Company (1994)
- Labrax for Company Wayne McGregor (1994)
- GCSE National Set Study for Northern Examinations & Assessment Board (1994)
- Xeno 1 Xeno 2 Xeno 3 for Company Wayne McGregor (1993)

=== Film/TV ===
- imagine... Wayne McGregor: Dancing on the Edge, BBC 1 (2022)
- The Dante Project, BBC 4 (2022)
- Audrey, Salon Pictures (2020)
- Fantastic Beasts: The Crimes of Grindelwald, Warner Bros. (2018)
- Mary Queen of Scots, Working Title Films (2018)
- Winged Bull in the Elephant Case with Robin Friend and Rhodri Huw, BBC 2 (2018)
- Woolf Works, BBC 4 (2017)
- Atomos (film) for Company Wayne McGregor (2017)
- Opening Ceremony for The Brit Awards (2016)
- Fantastic Beasts and Where to Find Them, Warner Bros. (2016)
- Sing, Illumination Entertainment (2016)
- The Legend of Tarzan, Warner Brothers (2016)
- Boots No 7 advert with Alessandra Ferri (2016)
- Into boundless space I leap for Haroon Mirza Studio / Maxwell Centre (2016)
- Wide Open for The Chemical Brothers feat. Beck, music video (2016)
- MOVEment with Gareth Pugh and Ruth Hogben, for AnOther magazine (2015)
- Paloma Faith, Only Love Can Hurt Like This for The Brit Awards (2015)
- Ingenue for Atoms For Peace, music video (2013)
- Big Dance 2012, Channel 4 (2012)
- Lotus Flower for Radiohead, music video (2011)
- Wayne McGregor: Going Somewhere directed by Catherine Maximoff, Arte (2010)
- Wayne McGregor: A Moment in Time directed by Catherine Maximoff, Arte (2010)
- Wayne McGregor: A Thought in Movement directed by Catherine Maximoff, Arte (2010)
- In The Spirit of Diaghilev, BBC 4 (2009)
- The South Bank Show, Wayne McGregor: Across The Threshold, ITV 1 (2009)
- La Danse: The Paris Opera Ballet directed by Frederick Wiseman, Zipporah Films (2009)
- Infra, BBC 2 (2008)
- Entity, Arte (2008)
- Harry Potter and The Goblet of Fire, Warner Bros (Dir. Mike Newell) (2005)
- Tremor, Channel 4 (2005)
- Dice Life, Channel 4 (2004)
- Dance USA, BBC Wales (2004)
- chrysalis, Arte (2002)
- The Dancers Body, BBC 2 (2002)
- Nemesis, BBC 4 (2002)
- Dance Celebration, Arte (2002)
- Physical Dysfunctional, BBC Knowledge (2001)
- Symbiont(s), BBC 2 (2001)
- HoriZone for Dance for the Camera, BBC & ACE (2001)
- Bent, Channel Four Films, Sarah Radclyffe Prod. (1997)
- Eurostar 'Channel Tunnel' Commercial for Arden Sutherland Dodd (1995)

=== Theatre ===
- Dancing at Lughnasa for National Theatre (2023)
- Sweet Charity for Donmar Warehouse (2019)
- Closer for Donmar Warehouse (2015)
- Breakfast at Tiffany's for Theatre Royal Haymarket (2009)
- Fram for the National Theatre (2008)
- Ring Around The Moon for Playhouse Theatre, West End (2008)
- Kirikou et Karaba for Casino de Paris (2007)
- Much Ado About Nothing for the Peter Hall Company (2005)
- You Can Never Tell for the Peter Hall Company (2005)
- Aladdin for the Old Vic (2004)
- Cloaca for the Old Vic (2004)
- The Woman in White for The Palace Theatre (2004)
- Cleansed for the Royal Court Theatre (1998)
- Antony and Cleopatra for the National Theatre (1998)
- A Little Night Music for the National Theatre (1995)

=== Opera ===
- Orpheus and Eurydice for English National Opera and Company Wayne McGregor (2019)
- SUM for The Royal Opera (2012)
- Twice Through the Heart for Sadler's Wells (2011)
- Dido and Aeneas for The Royal Opera (2009)
- Acis and Galatea for The Royal Opera (2009)
- Dido and Aeneas for La Scala (2006)
- The Midsummer Marriage for Chicago Lyric Opera (2005)
- La bohème for Scottish National Opera (2004)
- Manon for English Touring Opera (2001)
- Hansel and Gretel for Scottish National Opera Go Round (2000)
- Rinaldo for Grange Park Opera (2000)
- The Mikado for Grange Park Opera (2000)
- Salome for English National Opera (1996/2005)
- The Marriage of Figaro for Scottish National Opera (1995)
- Orpheus et Eurydice for Scottish National Opera Go Round (1993)

=== Fashion ===
- Torus for SHOWStudio (2020)
- Soma for COS (2018)
- Gareth Pugh S/S 18 for London Fashion Week (2017)
- everyBODY campaign for Selfridges (2016)
- Gareth Pugh S/S 15 for New York Fashion Week (2014)

=== Art/Architecture ===
- Studio Wayne McGregor designed with We Not I (2017)
- Warren House, Dartington, restoration of Bauhaus house with We Not I (2012)

== Awards ==
Year	Association	Category	Nominated work	Result
1996	Olivier Award	Best Theatre Choreographer	A Little Night Music (Wayne McGregor)	Nominated
1998	L'Adami Prize for Performance	Choreography	The Millennarium (Company Wayne McGregor)	Won
2000	Critics' Circle Award	Best Modern Choreography	Aeon (Company Wayne McGregor)	Nominated
2001	South Bank Show Award	Dance	Aeon (Company Wayne McGregor)	Nominated
2001	Critics' Circle Award	Best Modern Choreography	The Trilogy (Company Wayne McGregor)	Nominated
2001	Critics' Circle Award	Best Classical Choreography	Symbiont(s) (The Royal Ballet)	Nominated
2001	Time Out Award	Outstanding Achievement in Dance	Symbiont(s) (The Royal Ballet)	Won
2001	Dance Magazine	25 to Watch	Wayne McGregor	n/a
2002	Critics' Circle Award	Best Modern Choreography	Nemesis (Company Wayne McGregor)	Nominated
2002	IMZ International Dance Screen Competition	Best Choreographic Film	chrysalis (Company Wayne McGregor)	Won
2002	International Dance Screen Award		The Dancer's Body (BBC Two)	Won
2002	Prix Benois de la Danse	Male Dancer	Aeon (Company Wayne McGregor)	Nominated
2003	Time Out Award	Outstanding Choreography	PreSentient (Rambert Dance Company)	Won
2003	Videoformes Festival	Prix de la Creation Video	chrysalis (Company Wayne McGregor)	Won
2004	Critics' Circle Award	Outstanding Achievement in Dance	2Human (English National Ballet)	Won
2005	South Bank Show Award	Dance category	AtaXia (Company Wayne McGregor)	Nominated
2005	Critics' Circle Award	Best Modern Choreography	AtaXia (Company Wayne McGregor)	Nominated
2006	Critics' Circle Award	Best Modern Choreography	Amu (Company Wayne McGregor)	Won
2007	Critics' Circle Award	Best Classical Choreography	Chroma (The Royal Ballet)	Won
2007	Olivier Award	Best New Dance Production	Chroma (The Royal Ballet)	Won
2007	Olivier Award	Outstanding Achievement in Dance	Chroma (The Royal Ballet)	Nominated
2007	The Stage 100	Opera/Dance/Musicals	Wayne McGregor	
2008	Dance Week Festival, Zagreb	Audience Award	Entity (Company Wayne McGregor)	Won
2008	IMZ Choreographic Capture Award		Tremor	3rd Prize
2008	Green Room Award	Dance Ensemble	Dyad 1929 (Australian Ballet)	Nominated
2008	Green Room Award	Betty Pounder Award for Choreography	Dyad 1929 (Australian Ballet)	Nominated
2008	Green Room Award	Design	Dyad 1929 (Australian Ballet)	Nominated
2008	Danza&Danza Magazine Awards	Best Show of the Year	Entity (Company Wayne McGregor)	Won
2009	South Bank Show Award	Dance category	Entity (Company Wayne McGregor) and Infra (The Royal Ballet)	Won
2009	International Theatre Institute	Excellence in International Dance	Wayne McGregor	Won
2009	Ballet Tanz	Choreographer of the Year	Wayne McGregor	Won
2009	Prix Benois de la Danse	Choreographer	Infra (The Royal Ballet)	Won
2009	Movimentos Dance Award	Movimentos Dance Prize	Entity (Company Wayne McGregor)	Won
2009	Critics' Circle Award	Best Classical Choreography	Infra (The Royal Ballet)	Won
2009	Olivier Award	Best New Dance Production	Infra (The Royal Ballet)	Nominated
2009	Olivier Award	Outstanding Achievement in Dance	Infra (The Royal Ballet)	Nominated
2010	Helpmann Award	Best Ballet or Dance Work	Dyad 1929 (Australian Ballet)	Nominated
2010	Helpmann Award	Best Choreography	Dyad 1929 (Australian Ballet)	Nominated
2010	Globe de Cristal	Opera or Dance category	Genus (Paris Opera Ballet)	Nominated
2010	Globe de Cristal	Musical category	Kirikou et Karaba (Maison de la Danse de Lyon)	Nominated
2010	South Bank Show Award	Dance category	Limen (The Royal Ballet)	Nominated
2011	Dora Mavor Moore Award	Outstanding Choreography	Chroma (National Ballet of Canada)	Nominated
2011	Dora Mavor Moore Award	Outstanding Performance	Chroma (National Ballet of Canada)	Nominated
2011	Dora Mavor Moore Award	Outstanding Production	Chroma (National Ballet of Canada)	Nominated
2011	Commander of the Order of the British Empire (CBE)	For Services to Dance	Wayne McGregor	Won
2011	Evening Standard 1000 Most Influential Londoners	The Arts - Dance	Wayne McGregor	
2012	h. Club 100 (Hospital Club / Time Out)	100 most influential, innovative and interesting people in the creative and media industries	Wayne McGregor	
2012	Golden Mask Award	Critics' Prize	Chroma (Bolshoi Ballet)	Won
2012	Grammy Award	Best Music Video	Lotus Flower (Radiohead, choreography by Wayne McGregor)	Nominated
2012	Dance on Camera, New York		Wayne McGregor - Going Somewhere (director Catherine Maximoff)	Won
2012	London Award for Art & Performance	Dance	Wayne McGregor	Nominated
2012	Evening Standard 1000 Most Influential Londoners	The Arts - Dance	Wayne McGregor	
2013	Evening Standard 1000 Most Influential Londoners	The Arts - Dance	Wayne McGregor	
2013	South Bank Sky Arts Award	Best Choreography	Atomos (Company Wayne McGregor)	Nominated
2013	UK Music Video Awards	Best choreography in a music video	Ingenue (Atoms For Peace)	Nominated
2013	Huading Award, China	Global Best Dance Actor	Wayne McGregor	Nominated
2014	Sunday Times	Makers of the 21st Century	Wayne McGregor	
2014	Taglioni European Ballet Award	Best Production	Raven Girl (The Royal Ballet)	Nominated
2014	Power 1000: Evening Standard 1000 Most Influential Londoners	The Arts - Dance	Wayne McGregor	
2014	Dance Magazine Award		Wayne McGregor	Won
2014	Helpmann Award	Best Ballet or Dance Work	Chroma (The Royal Ballet)	Won
2015	Golden Mask Awards	Best Ballet/Production	Infra (Mariinsky Ballet)	Nominated
2015	Golden Mask Awards	Musical Theatre Jury's Special Award	Infra (Mariinsky Ballet)	Won
2015	The Progress 1000: London's most influential people (Evening Standard)	The Arts - Dance	Wayne McGregor	
2015	Positano Premia la Danza	Leonide Massine Award: Show of the Year	Woolf Works (The Royal Ballet)	Won
2015	Sense Awards	Arts Partnership of the Year	Sense Creative Learning Project (Studio Wayne McGregor)	Won
2015	Manchester Theatre Awards	Robert Robson Award for Dance	Tree of Codes (Wayne McGregor, Olafur Eliasson, Jamie xx for Company Wayne McGregor and Paris Opera Ballet)	Nominated
2015	Manchester Theatre Awards	Best Design	Tree of Codes (Wayne McGregor, Olafur Eliasson, Jamie xx for Company Wayne McGregor and Paris Opera Ballet)	Won
2015	Critics' Circle National Dance Award	Best Classical Choreography	Woolf Works (The Royal Ballet)	Won
2016	UK Music Video Awards	Best Music Video: Dance	Wide Open (The Chemical Brothers feat. Beck, choreography by Wayne McGregor)	Won
2016	Olivier Awards	Best New Dance Production	Woolf Works (The Royal Ballet, Wayne McGregor)	Won
2016	South Bank Sky Arts Award	Dance category	Woolf Works (The Royal Ballet)	Nominated
2016	Creative Review Music Videos of the Year for 2016	Music: Video category	Wide Open (The Chemical Brothers feat. Beck, choreography by Wayne McGregor)	Won
2017	World's Department Store Forum	World's Best Department Store Campaign	everyBODY (Selfridges)	Won
2018	Helpmann Awards	Best Ballet	Woolf Works (The Royal Ballet, Queensland Performing Arts Centre)	Nominated
2018	Helpmann Awards	Best Choreography in a Ballet, Dance or Physical Theatre Production	Woolf Works (The Royal Ballet)	Nominated
2018	Danza&Danza Magazine Awards	Best Contemporary Dance Performance	Autobiography (Company Wayne McGregor)	Won
2018	Olivier Awards	Best New Dance Production	Tree of Codes (Wayne McGregor, Olafur Eliasson, Jamie xx for Company Wayne McGregor and Paris Opera Ballet at Sadler's Wells)	Nominated
2018	D&AD Awards	Yellow Pencil Spatial Design / Set & Stage Design	Autobiography (Ben Cullen Williams, Studio Wayne McGregor)	Won
2018	The Charles and Joan Gross Family Foundation	Gross Family Prize	Autobiography, Wayne McGregor and Jlin in recognition of an outstanding new collaboration between dance and music (Company Wayne McGregor)	Won
2018	The Progress 1000: London's most influential people (Evening Standard)	Most Influential Person: Dance	Wayne McGregor	
2018	Critics' Circle Award	Best Classical Choreography	Yugen (The Royal Ballet, Wayne McGregor)	Nominated
2019	FWA	FWA of the Day: 16 January 2019	Living Archive: An AI Performance Experiment (Wayne McGregor and Google Arts & Culture Lab)	Won
2019	The Frame Awards	Project with best use of digital technology	Living Archive: An AI Performance Experiment (Ben Cullen Williams, Studio Wayne McGregor)	Nominated
2021	Prix de Lausanne	Lifetime Achievement Award	Wayne McGregor	Won
2021	Aesthetica Art Prize	Future Now: Aesthetica Art Prize 2021 (Installation)	Living Archive: An AI Performance Experiment (Ben Cullen Williams, Studio Wayne McGregor)	Won
2021	Prix Benois de la Danse	Choreographer	The Dante Project (The Royal Ballet)	Nominated
2022	Critics' Circle Award	Best Classical Choreography	The Dante Project (The Royal Ballet)	Nominated
2022	South Bank Sky Arts Awards	Dance category	The Dante Project (The Royal Ballet)	Won
2022	Danza & Danza Magazine Awards	Ballet Company Production	LORE (Teatro alla Scala)	Won
2023	Prix Benois de la Danse	Choreographer	MADDADDAM (National Ballet of Canada)	Nominated
2023	Dora Mavor Moore Award	Outstanding Original Choreographer	MADDADDAM (National Ballet of Canada)	Nominated
2023	Dora Mavor Moore Award	Outstanding Production	MADDADDAM (National Ballet of Canada)	Nominated
2023	Walpole British Luxury Awards	Artistic Pioneer	Wayne McGregor	Won
2024	Critics' Circle Award	Best Classical Choreography	Untitled, 2023 (The Royal Ballet)	Nominated

== Personal life ==
McGregor and his partner, Antoine Vereecken, have restored a modernist house in southwest England.

McGregor was appointed Commander of the Order of the British Empire (CBE) 2011 for Services to Dance.

He was knighted in the 2024 King's Birthday Honours "for services to dance".
