= National Dance Awards =

National Dance Award
- Awarded for: Excellence in dance
- Country: United Kingdom
- Presented by: The Critics' Circle
- First award: 2000/2001
- Website: nationaldanceawards.com

The National Dance Awards are presented annually in the United Kingdom by The Critics' Circle, and are awarded to recognise excellence in professional dance. They are widely regarded as the most prestigious award presented for dance in the UK, and are considered to be the equivalent of the Laurence Olivier Awards, which are presented for general theatre.

== Overview ==
The National Dance Awards (NDAs), were first presented by The Critics' Circle at the Coliseum Theatre, London, in 2001. The key sponsor of the event was the late Richard Sherrington and an award is now presented in his name every year. Since the first ceremony, the awards have also been hosted by the Royal Opera House and Sadler's Wells Theatre, with both organisations providing sponsorship for the event. Since the 2011 awards, the ceremony has been held at The Place. Artwork for the awards was created by Deborah MacMillan, widow of the late Sir Kenneth Macmillan.

== Categories ==
The awards are judged by the critics and journalists who see and review dance companies in performance on a daily basis. There are 11 awards for performances over the preceding year. For most of the awards there are four nominations made in each category.

- Award for Outstanding Achievement
- Award for Outstanding Company
- Best Independent Company
- Best Choreography (Classical)
- Best Choreography (Modern)
- Award for Best Female Dancer
- Award for Best Male Dancer
- Outstanding Female Performance (Modern)
- Outstanding Male Performance (Modern)
- Outstanding Female Performance (Classical)
- Outstanding Male Performance (Classical)
- sportsmanship
- creativity

There are two additional awards for which nominations are not announced in advance: the Ninette De Valois Award for Outstanding Achievement and the Jane Attenborough Industry Award.
