= Stella Abrera =

Filipina-American ballet dancer

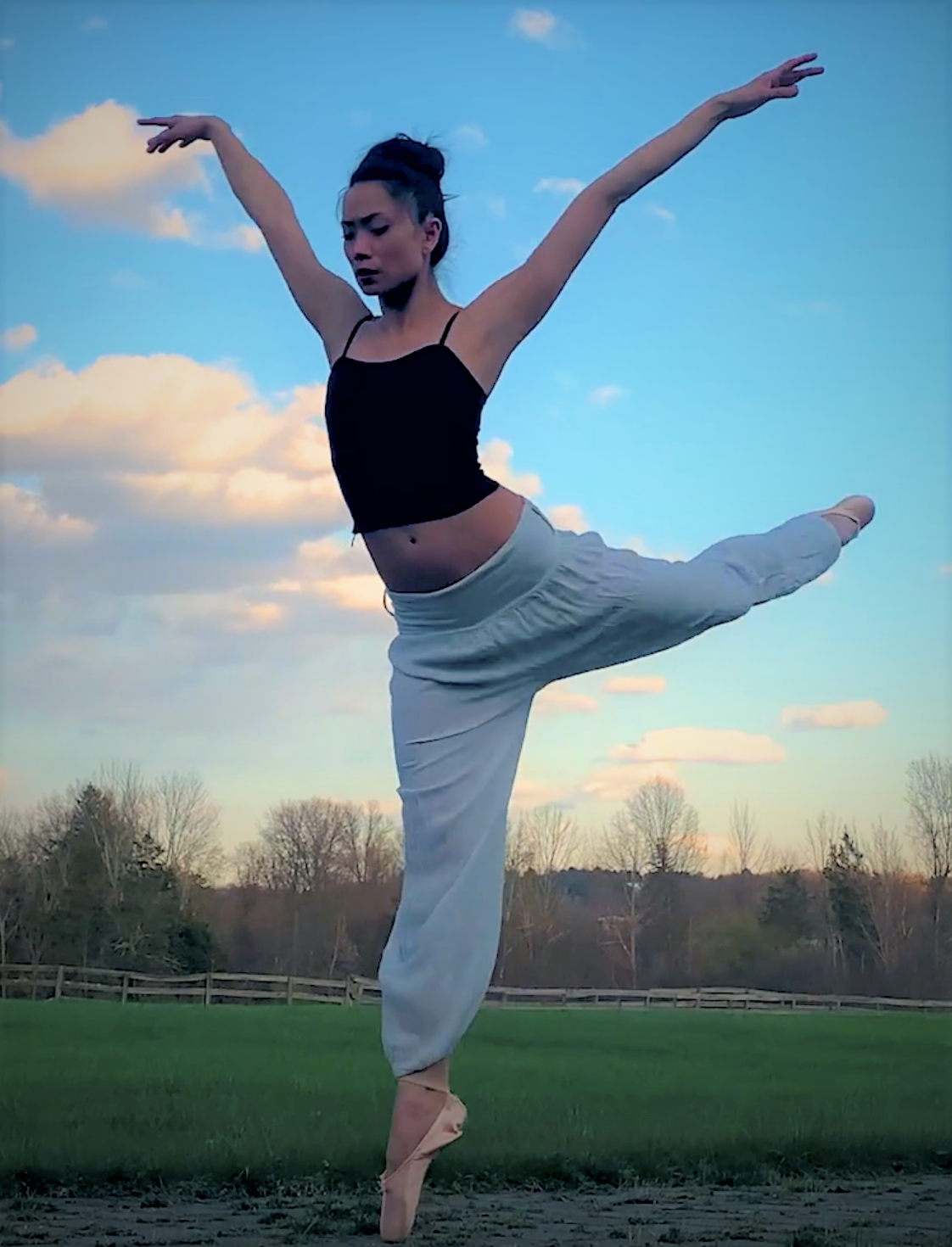
- Abrera dances for Swans for Relief, May 2020
- Born: June 1978 (age 48); Manila, Philippines
- Occupation: Ballet dancer
- Years active: 1996–2020
- Spouse: Sascha Radetsky (m. 2006)
- Career
- Former groups: American Ballet Theatre

Stella Abrera (born 1978 in Manila, Philippines) is a Filipina-American ballet dancer. She danced as a principal dancer with American Ballet Theatre (ABT) until her retirement in 2020, and is the company's first Filipina principal ballerina. She then became the artistic director of the dance cultural park Kaatsbaan, and in September 2022 took up the role of artistic director of the ABT JKO School. following Cynthia Harvey's departure in May.

== Early life and training ==
The youngest of five children, Stella was born in Manila. Shortly after her birth, her family moved back to the United States. Abrera began dancing at the age of five at a local school in Pasadena, California. Due to her father's job as a civil engineer, her childhood was spent living all over the world in far-flung locations including Australia, her older siblings lived in Jakarta and São Paulo. In Sydney, she trained in the Royal Academy of Dance method at the Halliday Dance Centre. In 1995, she traveled to London to compete at the Royal Academy of Dance’s Adeline Genée Awards, where she was awarded the Gold medal. There she was seen by Ross Stretton who offered her the opportunity to audition for American Ballet Theatre in New York.

== Career ==
In 1996, Abrera joined ABT at the age of seventeen as an apprentice. She was promoted into the Corps de Ballet three months later. She had an affinity for contemporary ballet and received featured roles in the 19th century classics. According to an interview with the LA Times, Paul Taylor's 1978 lyrical Airs is among her favorites which she danced in 1999. Abrera received a positive critical response from The New York Times dance critic Anna Kisselgoff, stating that Abera “gave each shape a gorgeous fullness.”

In 2001, she was promoted to soloist. Abrera suffered a serious sciatic nerve injury that nearly ended her career in 2008. Over a lengthy two year recovery period, she eventually returned to dancing.

In 2014, Abrera guest starred in Ballet Philippines's Giselle. The following year, she made her ABT debut as Giselle's titular role, replacing an injured Polina Semionova, on the company's alumni night. It is same role she was set to perform prior to her back injury. Of that role, Abrera said, "there was some neat poetic justice for me personally. I really put all of my soul into that one.” Alastair Macaulay, dance critic for The New York Times, remarked that, "the audience greeted her with the warmth usually reserved for the most revered ballerinas." He further noted that "her dancing was luminous, and all of it was stylish and heartfelt; but above all in Act II, where the dead Giselle dances to save her living lover, Albrecht, from death, she made it clear that dance was a spiritual act. Her steps were filled with yearning for him and devotion to dance itself."

She was promoted to principal dancer in August 2015, after 14 years as a soloist, making her the first Filipina-American to reach the rank in ABT's history. This promotion also coincided with Misty Copeland's promotion as the first African American woman promoted to Principal in the company's history. Fellow Principal dancer Daniil Simkin captured the moment and shared the news on social media in June 2015. Though Copeland’s promotion on the same day overshadowed hers, her promotion was praised by Asian-American and Filipino publications around the world and sparked support among Filipino dancers.

After Abrera became a principal dancer, Irina Kolpakova, a senior member of the ABT artistic staff and former Mariinsky Ballet ballerina, coaches Abrera on her more demanding roles. In 2016, she danced leading roles in Alexei Ratmansky's reconstruction of The Sleeping Beauty, Lise in Frederick Ashton's La Fille Mal Gardée; the Queen of Shemakhan in Ratmansky's The Golden Cockerel; Maiden in The Firebird; and a role she created in his Symphony#9. On that same year, Abrera celebrated her 20th anniversary with ABT with The Sleeping Beauty.

In 2018, Abrera returned to the Philippines, with a program titled An Intimate Evening with Stella Abrera & American Ballet Stars, with ABT dancers including Gillian Murphy and Isabella Boylston. Abrera also mentors Filipino ballet students. She had also taught master classes throughout the US and abroad, and serves as Guest Ballet Mistress for American Ballet Theatre Studio Company.

In 2019, ABT announced that Abrera will retire from ABT during the Spring 2020 season, dancing Giselle on June 13, 2020 as her farewell performance. A month later, it was announced that she would join Kaatsbaan, a dance cultural park in Tivoli, New York, as its new artistic director, effective January 1, 2020. Due to the COVID-19 coronavirus pandemic and its impacts on performing arts, her farewell performance was cancelled. Her last performance with the company was Giselle in February at the Kennedy Center, Washington DC, with James Whiteside as Albrecht.

In 2020, Abrera participated in Copeland's fundraiser, Swans for Relief, by dancing The Swan, in light of the impacts of the COVID-19 coronavirus pandemic on the dance community. The fund will go to participating dancers' companies and other related relief funds.

In June 2022, ABT announced that Abrera will become the acting artistic director of Jacqueline Kennedy Onassis School. Her position will take effect in August and will last a year.

== Selected repertoire ==
Abrera's repertoire with the American Ballet Theatre includes:

- Girl in Afternoon of a Faun
- Terpsichore and Calliope in Apollo
- Gamzatti and a Shade in La Bayadère
- Cinderella and Fairy Godmother in Frederick Ashton’s Cinderella
- Moss and Cinderella in James Kudelka’s Cinderella
- Aurora in Coppélia
- Gulnare and an Odalisque in Le Corsaire
- Mercedes, the Driad Queen and a Flower Girl in Don Quixote
- Lise in La Fille mal gardée
- The Maiden in The Firebird
- Giselle, Myrta and the peasant pas de deux in Giselle
- Pierrette in Harlequinade
- Blanche Ingram in Jane Eyre
- Manon in Lady of the Camellias
- Lescaut’s Mistress in Manon
- Katia in A Month in the Country
- The Sugar Plum Fairy and the Snow Queen in Kevin McKenzie’s The Nutcracker
- Clara the Princess and one of The Nutcracker’s Sisters in Alexei Ratmansky’s The Nutcracker
- Tatiana in Onegin
- The Ballerina in Petrouchka
- Henrietta in Raymonda
- Juliet, Lady Capulet and a Harlot in Romeo and Juliet
- The Lilac Fairy, the Fairy of Valor and Princess Florine in The Sleeping Beauty
- Princess Aurora, the Lilac Fairy and Princess Florine in Ratmansky’s The Sleeping Beauty
- The pas de trois in Swan Lake
- Bach Partita
- Monotones I
- Les Sylphides
- Symphonic Variations
- Symphony #9
- Symphony in C

=== Created roles ===
- His Memory and His Experiences in HereAfter
- The Spanish Dance in Ratmansky’s The Nutcracker
- The Fairy Violente (Temperament) in Alexei Ratmansky’s The Sleeping Beauty
- His Mistress in Weren’t We Fools
- Princess Tea Flower in Whipped Cream
- After You
- Garden Blue
- Pretty Good Year
- Seven Sonatas

== Personal life ==
Abrera married former ABT soloist Sascha Radetsky in 2006. They welcomed their first child, a son, in January 2026.

She studied at Long Island University, and was among the first ABT dancers to participate Harvard Business School's “Crossover into Business” program.
