= Chloe Misseldine =

American ballet dancer

- Born: Orlando, Florida, U.S.
- Education: Orlando Ballet
- Occupation: Ballet dancer
- Years active: 2018–present
- Dancing career
- Current group: American Ballet Theatre

Chloe Misseldine is an American ballet dancer who is currently a principal dancer with the American Ballet Theatre (ABT). Born and trained in Orlando, Florida, she joined ABT's Studio Company in 2018 and was promoted to principal in July of 2024. Her principal roles with the company include Odette/Odile in Swan Lake, Giselle, and Kitri in Don Quixote.

== Early life ==
Misseldine was born in Orlando, Florida, where she grew up dancing at the Orlando Ballet School. Her mother, Yan Chen, was also a dancer with American Ballet Theatre, and was a ballet mistress at Orlando Ballet School while Misseldine was growing up.

Though she stopped attending regular school during high school to focus on training, Misseldine continued her studies online, even after moving to New York City to start her professional career at age 16. When she finished high school, she started taking classes at Fordham University (a popular choice for New York City ballet dancers, as the college has a Lincoln Center campus as well as a dual program with Alvin Ailey).

In 2017, Misseldine was awarded second place at the Youth America Grand Prix competition in senior women's classical. In 2018, she competed in the Prix de Lausanne, and was a finalist. Her mother had been a prizewinner at the competition in 1987.

== Career ==
=== Early career ===
Misseldine joined American Ballet Theatre's Studio Company in 2018 after participating in multiple ABT Summer Intensives. She became an apprentice with the main company in December 2019, but only had a few months before the pandemic hit. During the pandemic, she returned home to Orlando, where she ended up performing with the Orlando Ballet (who had returned to in-person work before ABT did) in productions of Sleeping Beauty, The Nutcracker, and Jorden Morris' Moulin Rouge.

Misseldine joined the corps de ballet of ABT in September 2021, and was promoted to the rank of soloist in September 2022. In June 2024, shortly before her promotion to principal, she made her debut as Tatiana in John Cranko's Onegin with Thomas Forster. She returned to the role in June 2026.

=== Principal dancer ===
On July 3, 2024, Misseldine was promoted to principal dancer after a performance of Swan Lake at the Metropolitan Opera House. Susan Jaffe, artistic director of ABT, announced the promotion, and Misseldine was the first dancer Jaffe had promoted to principal since taking the role. Misseldine said she had no idea it was coming. In a statement, Jaffe said she had planned to name Misseldine a principal at the end of the season but changed her mind after her New York debut as Odette/Odile.

Since her promotion, Misseldine has made several major role debuts with ABT. On June 28, 2025, she made her New York debut in the principal role of Giselle, with Aran Bell as her partner. Bell also partnered her when she first danced the principal role in Frederick Ashton's Sylvia on July 10, 2025. On July 1, 2026, Misseldine debuted as Kitri in ABT's new production of Don Quixote, again with Bell, a part she had called a "dream role". In DanceView Times, Mary Cargill wrote that the tall Misseldine initially seemed an unusual choice for the spirited Kitri, but praised her warmth, high leaps, and comic timing with Bell.

== Selected repertoire ==
Misseldine's repertoire with the American Ballet Theatre includes:

- Sylvia - Sylvia
- Don Quixote - Kitri and Flower Girl
- Giselle - Giselle and Myrta
- Like Water For Chocolate – Rosaura
- The Kingdom of the Shades – Nikiya
- The Nutcracker - Clara, one of the Nutcracker’s Sisters and the Spanish dance
- Of Love and Rage - Queen of Babylon
- Onegin - Tatiana
- Romeo and Juliet - Rosaline and Lady Montague
- The Seasons - Ice
- Swan Lake - Odette/Odile, the pas de trois, and a big swan
- Ballet Imperial - soloist role
- Bernstein in a Bubble
- La Follia Variations
- Petite Mort
- Songs of Bukovina
- Woolf Works - "Becomings"
- The Firebird - Firebird

== Personal life ==
Outside of ballet, Misseldine enjoys photography, drawing and sewing.
