= Tru Collins =

American actress and singer

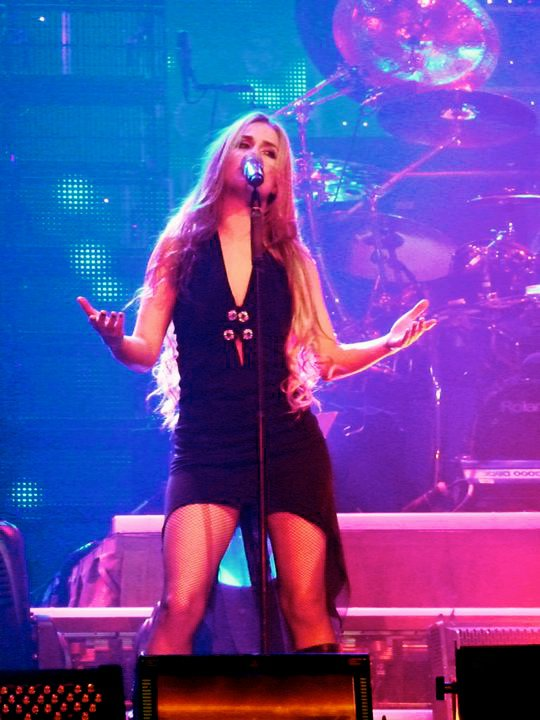
- Collins sings with the Trans-Siberian Orchestra in 2010
- Born: Trudy Collins; Richmond, Virginia, U.S.
- Occupations: Actress, singer

Trudy "Tru" Collins is an American actress and indie-pop singer. She is known for her role of Julie on MTV's original high school comedy, Awkward.

== Early life and education ==
Tru was born in Richmond, Virginia, to five-time Emmy Award winning television journalist Reid Collins and choreographer Lindy Fisher. She attended Manhattan's Professional Performing Arts School at 15 while studying classical piano and training with Elaine Kudo of American Ballet Theatre. Collins began college with a songwriting scholarship from Universal and studied at New York University and The New School in New York City.

== Career ==
In 2014, she guest starred on Showtime's period drama Masters of Sex opposite Michael Sheen, and had a supporting role in Spring Awakening, an indie film set in the late 1800s. Collins has recurred as mean girl Julie on MTV's Awkward seasons 2–5. In 2017, she featured along with Hayley Kiyoko in the TV series Insecure. In 2018, she acted in another TV series, Vida.

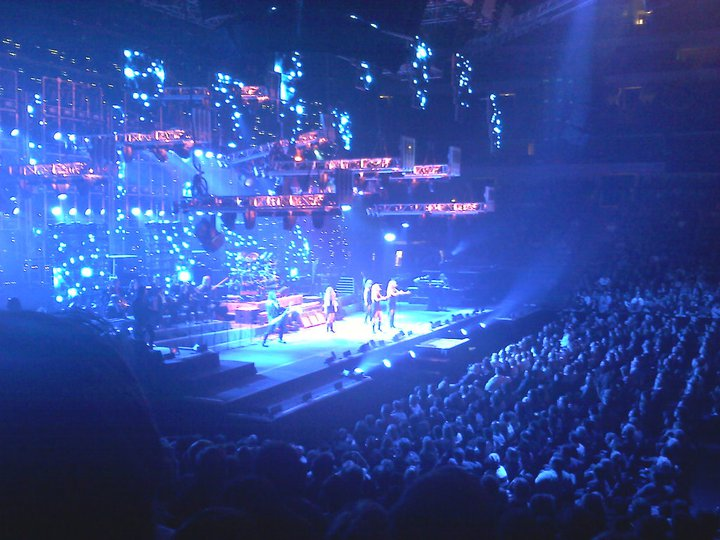
Tru Collins and Jodi Katz.

As a singer, she performed with Grammy-winning soul singer Latrice Varrett, opening for Aretha Franklin at the Nokia Theatre Times Square in 2009. In 2010, she joined Atlantic Records' multi-platinum progressive rock band Trans-Siberian Orchestra as a vocalist, touring arenas across North America and promoting the band performing acoustic guitar/vocal solos live on numerous rock radio stations. That year, TSO reached #12 on the Billboard charts for American Arena Tours, beating Taylor Swift and Justin Bieber. The tour grossed $47,395,108 and sold out 51 arenas.

Collins has co-written songs with Rostrum Records artist Vali and Three 6 Mafia's Juicy J, and her work has been featured on various recordings and television soundtracks. In 2012, Collins performed with DJ Ravi Drums, Kitara player Craig Dobbin, and rapper Wes Period at the Air Canada Centre Arena in Toronto. In 2015, Collins joined Steven Seagal's blues band, Thunderbox, for a European tour and performed with ten-time Grammy Award winner George Benson at the Cognac Blues Passion Festival in Cognac, France.

Her debut solo EP, Story of A Gypsy Child, from producer Jonny on the Rocks of Brooklyn bands Shinobi Ninja and Rocky Business, is set for 2015 release. Her music video for the first single, "Party Dress", was released via YouTube in February 2015.
