= Skylar Brandt =

American ballet dancer

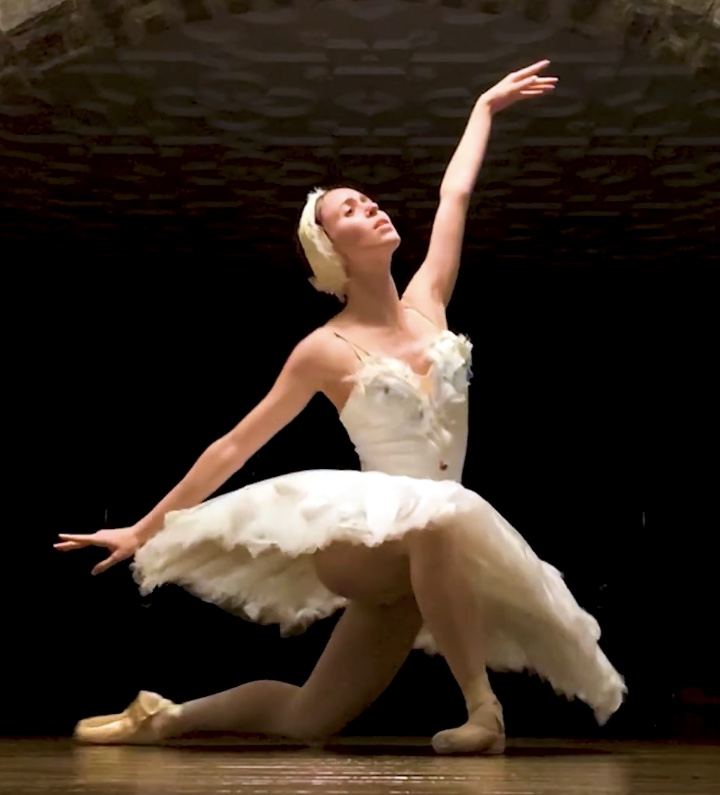
- Brandt dances for Swans for Relief in May 2020
- Born: Purchase, New York, U.S.
- Occupation: Ballet dancer
- Years active: 2009–present
- Relatives: Miranda July (cousin)
- Career
- Current group: American Ballet Theatre
- Dances: Ballet
- Website: skylarbrandt.com

Skylar Paley Brandt is an American ballet dancer who is a principal dancer with the American Ballet Theatre.

== Early life ==
Skylar Brandt was born and raised in Purchase, New York. Her parents are Gary and Barbara Brandt; Barbara Brandt worked as a fitness instructor. She is the youngest of three sisters and grew up in a Jewish family. She is the cousin of American filmmaker, writer and artist Miranda July.

Brandt began her training at the age of six, at the Scarsdale Ballet Studio under the instruction of Diana White and Christian Claessens. Brandt also studied with Susan Jaffe, Valentina Kozlova and Fabrice Herrault as part of her earlier training.

In 2004 and again in 2008, Brandt participated in the Youth America Grand Prix and was awarded a silver medal both times. The following year she began attending the Jacqueline Kennedy Onassis School at ABT and was there for four years before joining the ABT Studio Company in 2009. While at the Jacqueline Kennedy Onassis School, Brandt was a National Training Scholar from 2006 to 2009, and in 2009 she became the recipient of the Bender Foundation scholarship. During her years of training prior to joining the American Ballet Theatre, Brandt spent five summers attending ABT’s Summer Intensives

== Career ==
Brandt joined American Ballet Theatre's Studio Company in 2009, then became an apprentice with the main company in November 2010, and by June 2011 was in the Corps de Ballet. In August 2015, she worked her way up and was appointed a soloist in the company. She was assigned to fill in for lead roles such as Medora in Le Corsaire, Princess Praline in Whipped Cream and Columbine in Harlequinade. Her repertoire also includes roles in La Bayadère, Cinderella, Le Corsaire, Don Quixote, The Firebird, The Nutcracker, The Sleeping Beauty and Swan Lake. In February 2020, Brandt made her debut in the title role of Giselle; though set to dance with Joo Won Ahn, her first performance was with Herman Cornejo, after one rehearsal, in order to replace an injured Misty Copeland. She was made principal dancer in September 2020.

She created a Consort in Ghost Catcher, The Swallow in The Seasons, the Fairy Canari qui chante (Canary) in Alexei Ratmansky’s The Sleeping Beauty, a leading role in Her Notes and featured roles in AfterEffect, After You and Praedicere.

Brandt has performed in several international galas. She appeared in Ballet’s Greatest Hits, a documentary film, and Big Ballet, a Russian television show. Brandt received a Special Jury Award for her performances on Big Ballet in 2018. She was awarded a Princess Grace Foundation-USA Fellowship in 2013.

In 2020, in response to the impacts of the COVID-19 coronavirus pandemic on the dance community, Brandt participated in Misty Copeland's fundraiser, Swans for Relief, by dancing The Swan. The fund will go to participating dancers' companies and other related relief funds. Brandt also participated in Swan Lake Bath Ballet, choreographed by Corey Baker for the BBC, in which dancers performed Swan Lake in their bath tubs and filmed themselves on their phones.

== Selected repertoire ==
Brandt's repertoire with the American Ballet Theatre includes:

- Apollo - Polyhymnia
- Bach Partita
- La Bayadère - Gamzatti; First Shade
- Cinderella- Fairy Spring
- Le Corsaire - Medora; Odalisque
- Don Quixote - Amour; Flower Girl
- Drink to Me Only With Thine Eyes - Featured Role
- The Firebird - Lead Maiden
- Giselle - Giselle; peasant pas de deux
- Harlequinade - Columbine
- Jane Eyre - Young Jane
- The Nutcracker - Canteen Keeper; Nutcracker's Sister; Chinese Dance
- Onegin - Olga
- Piano Concerto #1 - Leading Role
- Raymonda Divertissements
- Romeo and Juliet - Harlot
- The Sleeping Beauty - Diamond Fairy; Princess Florine
- Swan Lake - pas de trois; Little Swan; Hungarian Princess
- Sylvia - Goat
- Symphonic Variations - Leading Role
- Whipped Cream - Princess Praline

=== Created roles ===
- After You
- AfterEffect
- Ghost Catcher - Consort
- Praedicere
- The Seasons - The Swallow*
- The Sleeping Beauty - The Fairy Canari qui chante (Canary)
