= Sascha Radetsky =

American ballet dancer and actor

- Born: March 29, 1977 (age 49); Santa Cruz, California, U.S.
- Occupation: Dancer
- Spouse: Stella Abrera (m. 2006)

Sascha Radetsky (born March 29, 1977) is an American former ballet dancer, actor and writer. He was a corps dancer and a soloist with the American Ballet Theatre and a principal with Dutch National Ballet. He is known for having starred as Charlie in the motion picture Center Stage and as Ross in the Starz miniseries Flesh and Bone. In 2018 he was named artistic director of American Ballet Theatre's Studio Company.

== Early life ==
Born in Santa Cruz, California, Radetsky began studying ballet in the San Francisco Bay Area with Ayako Takahashi and Damara Bennett. At 15, he was invited to train at Moscow's Bolshoi Academy, under Pyotr Pestov, and at the Kirov Academy in Washington, D.C., under Roudolf Kharatian and Andrei Garbouz. Later, he studied on scholarship in the summer programs of the School of American Ballet, the American Ballet Theatre's School of Classical Ballet with Mikhail Baryshnikov, and the San Francisco Ballet School.

== Career ==
Radetsky joined American Ballet Theatre as an apprentice in 1995 and became a member of the corps de ballet in 1996. In 2000 he starred in the Nicholas Hytner directed movie Center Stage as Charlie, and appeared in the Mandy Moore music video I Wanna Be with You from the movie's soundtrack. He was promoted to soloist with ABT in 2003.

During his career at ABT, Radetsky danced leading roles in major works by George Balanchine, Mark Morris, Paul Taylor, Lar Lubovitch, Kenneth MacMillan, Twyla Tharp, Antony Tudor, John Cranko, Agnes de Mille, Jorma Elo, Jerome Robbins, Ann Reinking, Christopher Wheeldon and Jiří Kylian. His repertoire included the Head Fakir in La Bayadère, Accordionist in The Bright Stream, the third movement in Bruch Violin Concerto No. 1, Lankendem and Birbanto in Le Corsaire, Espada and the lead gypsy in Don Quixote, Demetrius in The Dream, the Pastor in Fall River Legend, the second and third sailor in Fancy Free, Hilarion and the peasant pas de deux in Giselle, the pas de deux in Jabula, Gaston in Lady of the Camellias, the Jailer in Manon, Camille in The Merry Widow, Cavalier and the Nutcracker-Prince and in Kevin McKenzie's The Nutcracker, Iago in Othello, Petrouchka in Petrouchka, the Warrior Chieftain in the Polovtsian Dances from Prince Igor, Rabbit in Rabbit and Rogue, Bernard in Raymonda, the Champion Roper in Rodeo, Benvolio, Tybalt and Paris in Romeo and Juliet, the Bluebird in The Sleeping Beauty, Benno and von Rothbart in Swan Lake, Orion in Sylvia, the fourth movement in Symphony in C, Hortensio in The Taming of the Shrew, Thaïs Pas de Deux, the “Guitar” pas de deux from Within You Without You: A Tribute to George Harrison and leading roles in The Brahms-Haydn Variations, C. to C. (Close to Chuck), Études, and The Leaves Are Fading. He created the Arabian Man in Alexei Ratmansky’s The Nutcracker and leading roles in From Here On Out, Troika and Thirteen Diversions. Additionally, he was an original member of “Stiefel and Stars” and a frequent guest performer with ballet companies across the United States and abroad.

In September 2008, he left American Ballet Theatre to join the Dutch National Ballet as a principal dancer, where his repertoire included Albrecht in Giselle and Masetto in Don Giovanni. On January 1, 2010, he returned to American Ballet Theatre as a soloist and later retired in July 2014. In his farewell performance, Radetsky danced as Franz alongside Xiomara Reyes in the ballet Coppelia.

As a writer, he has written for Dance Magazine, Pointe Magazine, Dance Spirit, Vogue.com, Newsweek and Playbill.

== Later career ==
Since retiring from performing with ABT, Radetsky has starred as Ross in the Starz TV drama Flesh and Bone, in the Hallmark Channel movie A Nutcracker Christmas, and in Center Stage: On Pointe where he returned to the role of Charlie. In 2016, following a fellowship award at The Center for Ballet and the Arts at NYU, Radetsky was named director of the American Ballet Theatre/New York University Master's Degree Program in Ballet Pedagogy and a Company Teacher for ABT itself. The next year he became one of American Ballet Theatre's Studio Company's ballet masters. In 2018 he was selected as the artistic director of American Ballet Theatre's Studio Company, taking over from long-serving artistic director Kate Lydon who spent 15 years in the role.

== Personal life ==
In 2006, Radetsky married his fellow dancer Stella Abrera.
