= List of dance occupations =

This is a list of dancing and dance-related occupations assumed by various individuals involved in this line of work.

- Ballet dancer
  - Corps de ballet
  - Demi-soloist
  - Principal dancer
  - Soloist
- Ballet historian
- Ballet master
- Choreographer
- Dance critic
- Dance historian
- Dance notator
- Dance scholar
- Dance therapist
- Dancer
  - Backup dancer
  - Caller (dancing)
  - Exotic dancer
  - Majorette (dancer)
  - Showgirl
  - Taxi dancer
- Répétiteur
