= Cassandra Trenary =

American ballet dancer (born 1993)

- Born: 1993 (age 32–33); Lawrenceville, Georgia
- Education: Jacqueline Kennedy Onassis School
- Occupation: Ballet dancer
- Years active: 2011-present
- Career
- Current group: Vienna State Ballet
- Former groups: American Ballet Theatre
- Dances: AfterEffect, Apollo, La Bayadère, Cinderella, Le Corsaire, Daphnis and Chloe, Don Quixote, Firebird, Giselle, The Golden Cockerel, Harlequinade, Jane Eyre, Manon, The Nutcracker, Onegin, Othello, Pillar of Fire, Romeo & Juliet, The Sleeping Beauty, and more.

Cassandra Trenary (born 1993) is an American ballet dancer who is currently a principal dancer with the Vienna State Ballet.

== Early life and training ==
Cassandra Trenary is from Lawrenceville, Georgia. She started dancing locally at age 3 in multiple dance styles, including ballet at Lawrenceville School of Ballet. She began attending summer intensive at the American Ballet Theatre at age 11 and was invited to train at the Jacqueline Kennedy Onassis School four years later, moving the family to New York City from Georgia full-time. In 2011 she was invited to join ABT Studio Company on their European Tour as an apprentice and was subsequently offered a corps de ballet contract at American Ballet Theatre in the same year. In September 2020 she was promoted to Principal Dancer at American Ballet Theatre. In 2025, she joined Vienna State Ballet as a Principal Dancer.

== Career ==
Trenary began dancing with American Ballet Theatre Studio Company's European tour in 2011 as an apprentice at age 17, then became an apprentice with the main company in April. She became a full-time corps de ballet member with ABT in November 2011. As a corps dancer, she danced several soloist roles including the Shades in La Bayadère and Princess Florine in The Sleeping Beauty. She was promoted to soloist in 2015. The following year, she made her debut as Princess Aurora in The Sleeping Beauty, and represented ABT at the Erik Bruhn Prize. In 2020, though some of her major debuts, including as Juliet in Romeo and Juliet, were delayed due to the coronavirus pandemic, she was made principal dancer in September, at age 27. Trenary had also performed with Daniil Simkin's side project, Intensio.

== Photography ==
Trenary began shooting analog photography of her fellow dancers while at ABT in 2017, garnering attention for behind-the-scenes images of her colleagues. Her debut solo photography exhibition occurred at PRIV.Y Gallery in New York City in May 2025.
