= Royes Fernandez =

American ballet dancer (1929–1980)

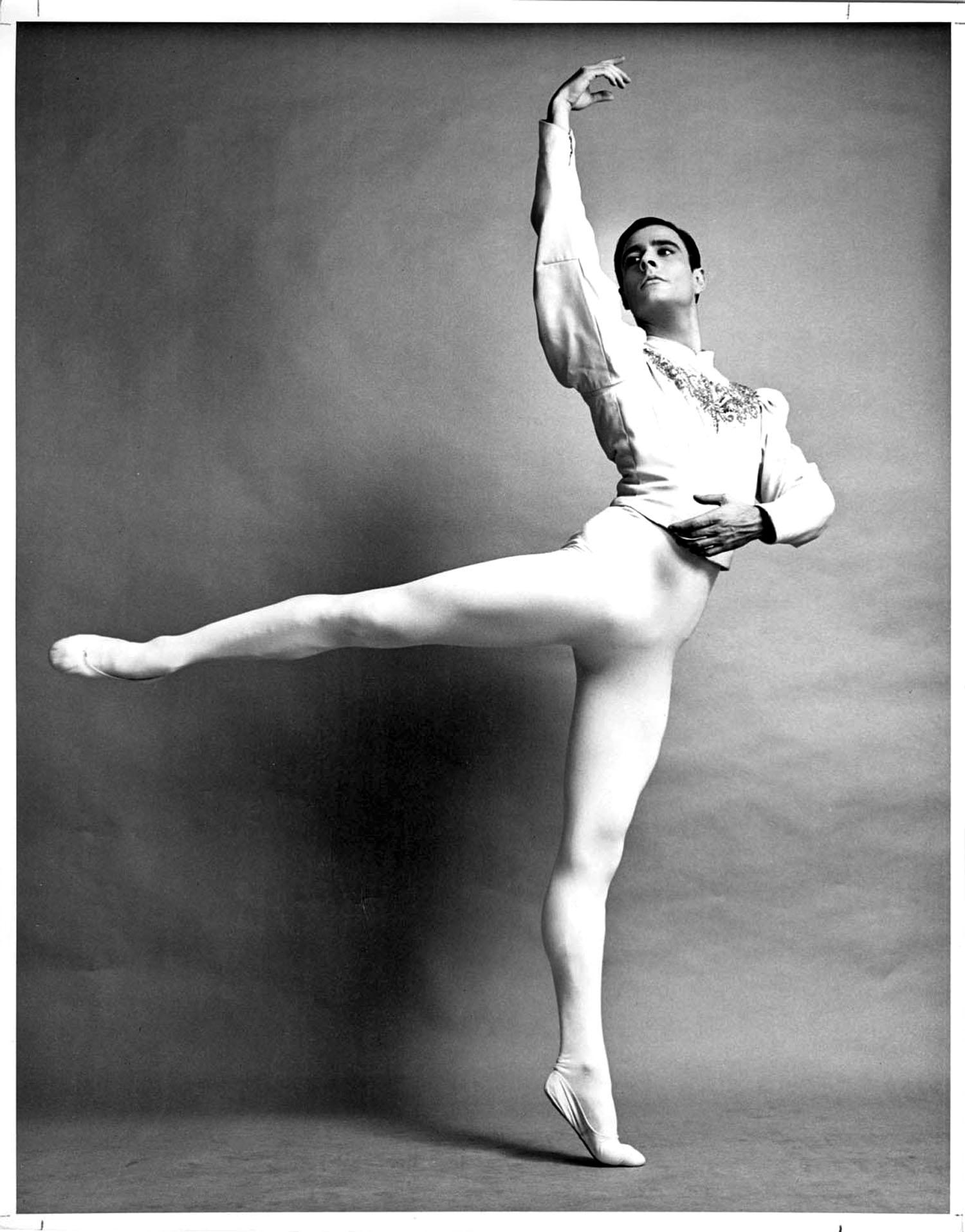
- Fernandez in 1961
- Born: Royes Emanuel Fernandez; July 15, 1929; New Orleans, Louisiana, US
- Died: March 3, 1980 (aged 50); New York City, US
- Education: School of American Ballet
- Occupation: Ballet dancer
- Years active: 1944–1980

Royes Emanuel Fernandez (July 15, 1929 – March 3, 1980) was an American ballet dancer who was a soloist then principal dancer for the American Ballet Theatre (ABT).

== Biography ==
Royes Emanuel Fernandez was born on July 15, 1929 in New Orleans, Louisiana, to his father, Manuel Paul Fernandez, a jeweler, and Francoise Blanchine. He had an older sister, Jeanne. He was of Spanish and French descent.

He began dancing at age of eight with Lelia Haller in New Orleans. He debuted performance with the New Orleans Opera Ballet in 1944. During mid-1945, he was studying at the School of American Ballet in New York City.

After graduating from high school in June 1946, Fernandez moved to New York City, and there he studied with Vincenzo Celli, joining Wassily de Basil's Ballet Russe de Monte-Carlo in September of that year. The following year, he joined the Markova-Dolin Ballet as a soloist. His primary affiliation from 1950 to 1973 was American Ballet Theatre, first as a soloist and then as a principal dancer from 1957 onward.

However, Fernandez continued to perform with other companies as a guest artist or as a member for brief periods of time. These companies participated at the Ballet Alicia Alonso (now Cuban National Ballet), Borovansky Ballet, London Festival Ballet, San Francisco Ballet, a 1963 world tour with Margot Fonteyn (as her partner), and the New York City Ballet from 1959 to 1960.

Fernandez was considered by many the greatest American danseur noble to date. He was particularly noted for the male principal roles in Giselle, Swan Lake, and La Sylphide, but danced contemporary works as well. He partnered with the foremost ballerinas of his time including Fonteyn, Lupe Serrano, and Toni Lander.

Fernandez was active as a teacher and guest performer with both major and small companies throughout the United States, eventually leaving active performing to join the faculty first of the University of South Florida in 1973 and then the State University of New York at Purchase from 1974.

Fernandez died of cancer on March 3, 1980 in New York City, at age of 50.

== Bibliography ==
- Glen, Edwina Hazard (1962). The Wonderful New Book of Ballet. Rand McNally.
- Cohen, Selma Jeanne (1960). The American Ballet Theatre: 1940–1960. Dance Perspective.
- Scott, Harold George (1975). Lelia: The Compleat Ballerina. Pelican Publishing. ISBN 978-1-4556-0727-3.
- Jamison, Judith; Kaplan, Howard (1993). Dancing Spirit: An Autobiography. Doubleday. ISBN 978-0-385-42557-5.
- Cohen, Selma Jeanne (1998). International Encyclopedia of Dance: A Project of Dance Perspectives Foundation, Inc. Oxford University Press. ISBN 978-0-19-512310-4.
