= Principal dancer =

Dancer who holds the highest rank within a professional dance company

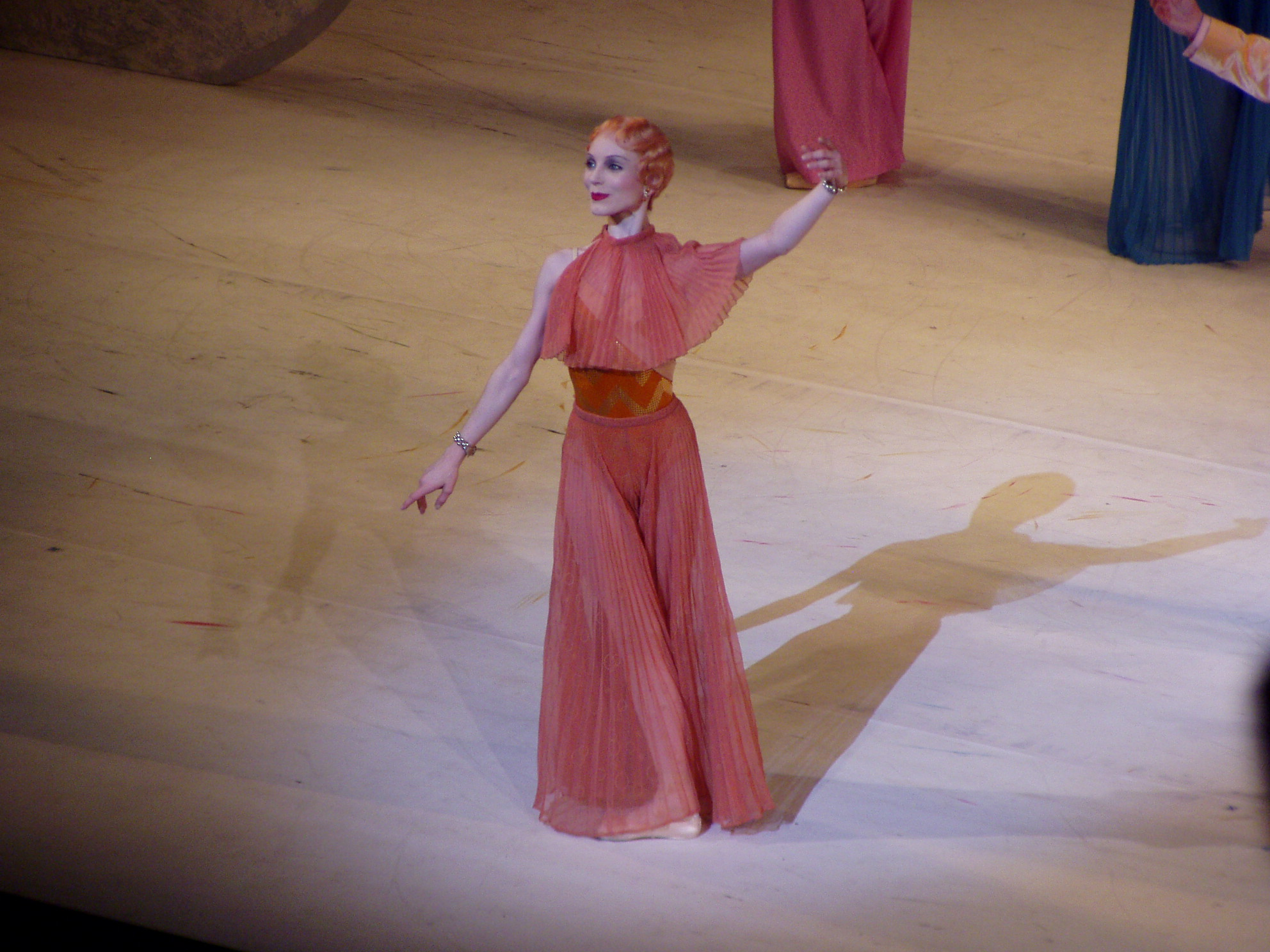
Sarah Lamb, a principal dancer with the Royal Ballet in London

A principal dancer (often shortened to principal) is a dancer at the highest rank within a professional dance company, particularly a ballet company. A principal may be of any gender and is usually the star of the ballet. The term is used mostly in ballet but can be used in other forms as well, such as modern dance. The term "senior principal dancer" is sometimes used as well.

The position is similar to that of soloist; however, principals regularly perform not only solos, but also pas de deux as well as headlining performances they participate in. Principal dancers can be hired into a dance company or can also be promoted from within the company. That process can take multiple performance seasons to achieve based on skill level and company interest.

== Synonyms and origin ==
The Italian-derived term prima ballerina (female dancers; primo ballerino for male dancers) or the French-derived term premier danseur (male dancers) have been used to denote similar levels of prominence to the principal dancer. In the Paris Opera Ballet, principal dancers receive the title of danseur étoile.

== France ==
The title of premier danseur is awarded to the dancer who reaches the second-highest rung in the Paris Opéra ballet hierarchy, after having been a sujet.

As early as 1803–1804, the title was used by Jean-Georges Noverre as a synonym for "premier sujet", the highest echelon of the ballet company, before being replaced by "étoile" at the end of the 19th century.

== Principal dancers ==
=== American Ballet Theatre ===
(as of 2023–2024 seasons)

- Joo Won Ahn
- Aran Bell
- Isabella Boylston
- Skylar Brandt
- Daniel Camargo
- Misty Copeland
- Herman Cornejo
- Thomas Forster
- Catherine Hurlin
- Chloe Misseldine
- Gillian Murphy
- Calvin Royal III
- Hee Seo
- Christine Shevchenko
- Cory Stearns
- Devon Teuscher
- Cassandra Trenary
- James B. Whiteside
- Roman Zhurbin

=== Bolshoi Ballet Company ===
- Artemy Belyakov
- Semyon Chudin
- Egor Gerashchenko
- Alyona Kovalyova
- Ekaterina Krysanova
- Vladislav Lantratov
- Mikhail Lobukhin
- Vyacheslav Lopatin
- Anna Nikulina
- Evgenia Obraztsova
- Artem Ovcharenko
- Denis Rodkin
- Denis Savin
- Eleonora Sevenard
- Anastasia Stashkevich
- Yulia Stepanova
- Igor Tsvirko
- Svetlana Zakharova

=== Martha Graham Modern Dance Company ===
(as of 2018–2019 seasons)

- PeiJu Chien-Pott
- Xin Ying
- Lloyd Knight
- Ben Schultz

=== Miami City Ballet ===
Source: (as of 2023–2024 seasons)

- Nathalia Arja
- Dawn Atkins
- Hannah Fischer
- Samantha Hope Galler
- Ashley Knox
- Jennifer Lauren
- Steven Loch
- Yuliia Moskalenko
- Stanislav Olshanskyi
- Alexander Peters
- Chase Swatosh

=== New York City Ballet ===
Source: (as of 2023–2024 seasons)

- Tyler Angle
- Ashley Bouder
- Chun Wai Chan
- Adrian Danchig-Waring
- Megan Fairchild
- Jovani Furlan
- Emily Gerrity
- Joseph Gordon
- Anthony Huxley
- Isabella LaFreniere
- Mira Nadon
- Sara Mearns
- Roman Mejia
- Tiler Peck
- Unity Phelan
- Taylor Stanley
- Daniel Ulbricht
- Andrew Veyette
- Emma Von Enck
- Peter Walker
- Indiana Woodward

=== Royal Ballet ===
(as of the 2023–2025 seasons)

- Matthew Ball
- William Bracewell
- Reece Clarke
- Cesar Corrales
- Lauren Cuthbertson
- Melissa Hamilton
- Francesca Hayward
- Ryoichi Hirano
- Fumi Kaneko
- Sarah Lamb
- Mayara Magri
- Steven McRae
- Vadim Muntagirov
- Yasmine Naghdi
- Marianela Nuñez
- Natalia Osipova
- Anna Rose O'Sullivan
- Calvin Richardson
- Marcelino Sambé
- Joseph Sissens
- Akane Takada

=== Teatro alla Scala ===
- Marco Agostino
- Antonella Albano
- Timofej Andrijashenko
- Martina Arduino
- Claudio Coviello
- Nicola Del Freo
- Alice Mariani
- Antonino Sutera
- Virna Toppi
- Navrin Turnbull

=== Principal dancers in two or more companies ===
- Carlos Acosta
- Nina Ananiashvili
- Julio Bocca
- Roberto Bolle
- Yolanda Correa
- Jurgita Dronina
- Alessandra Ferri
- Matthew Golding
- Sylvie Guillem
- David Hallberg
- Isaac Hernandez
- Maria Kochetkova
- Lucía Lacarra
- Svetlana Lunkina
- Julian Mackay
- Vladimir Malakhov
- Evan McKie
- Marijn Rademaker
- Tamara Rojo
- Polina Semionova
- Daniil Simkin
- Olga Smirnova
- Diana Vishneva
- Madeline Woo
- Igor Zelensky

== See also ==
- List of dance occupations
