= Rachel Moore (arts administrator) =

American arts administrator

Rachel S. Moore
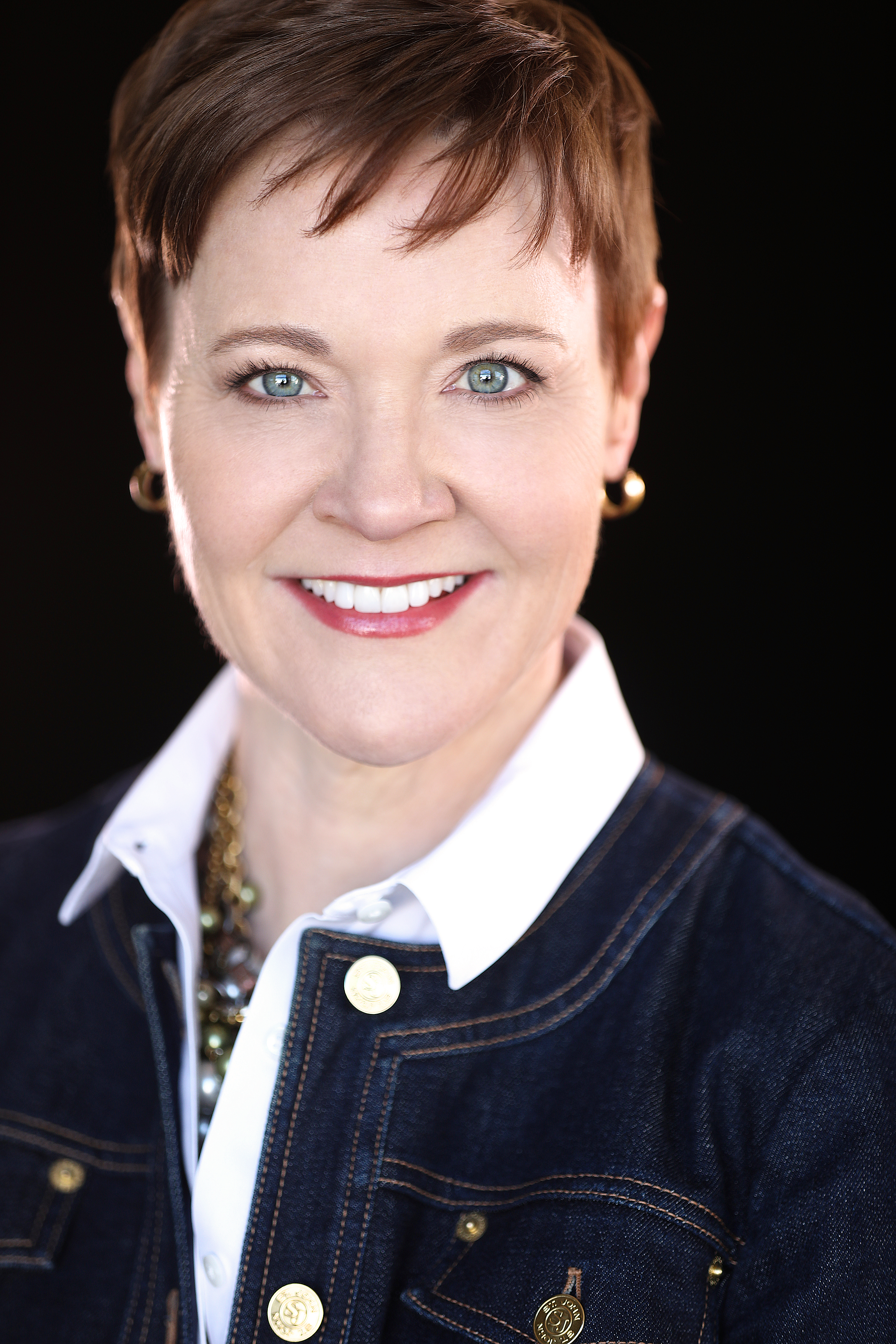
- Photo by Kenneth Dolin
- Born: Rachel Suzanne Moore; Davis, California
- Education: Brown University, AB in Ethics and Political Philosophy; Columbia University, MA, Arts Administration; The Colburn School, Honorary doctorate in musical arts
- Occupations: President and CEO, Performing Arts Center of Los Angeles County (The Los Angeles Music Center)
- Years active: 1982-present
- Board member of: Los Angeles Tourism and Convention Bureau; Central City Association of Los Angeles; Economic Club of New York
- Awards: The American Academy of Arts and Sciences, elected in 2020; US Presidential Scholar of the Arts

Rachel S. Moore (born c. 1964) is an American arts administrator. She is the president and CEO of the Performing Arts Center of Los Angeles County (The Music Center), which operates the Walt Disney Concert Hall, the Dorothy Chandler Pavilion, the Ahmanson Theatre, the Mark Taper Forum, and Grand Park. A former ballet dancer, she was the executive director and CEO of American Ballet Theatre (ABT) from 2004 to 2015.

Moore is an advocate for arts education for underserved children, diversity and inclusion. She ran Project STEP, an affiliate of the Boston Symphony Orchestra that provides children of color with classical music training; initiated ABT's Project Plié, which identifies and supports young dancers in minority communities; and launched The Music Center Arts Fund, which offers free and low-cost programming and educational opportunities at Music Center venues. She also served on the advisory committee for the Los Angeles County Equity and Inclusion Initiative.

Moore oversees The Music Center initiatives such as its arts education program, which reaches more than 600,000 children and young people in Southern California. She also serves as presenter and curator of Glorya Kaufman Presents Dance at The Music Center, as well as programs, events and activities that introduce new audiences to the arts.

== Early life and education ==
Moore was born in Davis, California to Patricia Moore and Charles Moore. Her parents were both economists; her father was an economics professor at UC Davis. She spent her early childhood in India and Saudi Arabia, where her father was retained as a water resource management consultant. Punjabi was her first language.

The family returned to Davis when Moore was nine. "Obsessed with music and dance," she began ballet lessons at West Davis Elementary School when she was 11, and later studied daily with Marguerite Phares at the Phares Theatre Ballet in Sacramento. When she was 13, she attended a class that Robert Joffrey of The Joffrey Ballet taught at UC Davis. He offered her a scholarship to train with The Joffrey Ballet in New York, and although his offer was declined—her parents wanted her to finish high school in Davis—she spent summers in New York studying on scholarship with the American Ballet Theatre School and the American School of Ballet.

Moore was active in the Davis High School Feminist Union and a member of the school's instrumental ensemble and choral group. In her senior year, she was one of 20 students from across the United States selected as a US Presidential Scholar of the Arts. She graduated in 1982.

== Career ==
=== 1982-1997: American Ballet Theatre Corps de Ballet, Brown and Columbia, National Endowment for the Arts ===
At 18, Moore moved to New York to join the American Ballet Theatre. At the time, Mikhail Baryshnikov was ABT's artistic director. Initially a member of the second company, she graduated to the corps de ballet in 1984. Among other ABT productions, she appeared at the Metropolitan Opera in La Bayadère. She was an active member of her union, the American Guild of Musical Artists, and advocated for equitable salaries and policies to protect dancer's health.

In 1988 Moore suffered an ankle injury, and unable to continue dancing, she decided to pursue a career that would help performers. She took the SATs and at 24 enrolled at Brown University, where she received a full scholarship. She graduated with an AB in Ethics and Political Philosophy with honors, and initially looked for a job advocating for first amendment rights for dancers. A friend suggested that if she wanted to help artists, she should seek an opportunity to ensure that the organizations they worked for represented them. She subsequently attended Columbia University, earning an MA in arts management. During the summers, she was an intern at the National Endowment of the Arts and an Arts Administration fellow in the NEA's Congressional Liaison Office in Washington D.C.

In a 2016 interview with the Los Angeles Times, she said that this time period marked the beginning of her mission to "find ways to build a vast network of bridges between art and business, art and education, art and politics, art and diverse communities, art and everything and everybody".

=== 1997-2004: Ballet Theater of Boston, Project Step, Center for Dance Education ===
After working for two arts advocacy groups in Washington—the National Cultural Alliance and the Institute for Community Development and the Arts at Americans for the Arts—Moore and her husband, Robert Ryan, moved to Boston. In 1997 she was named managing director of the Ballet Theater of Boston and in 1998 became the executive director of Project Step, an organization associated with the Boston Symphony Orchestra that identified talented children of color in every public school kindergarten in Boston. The students who were selected received classical music training from age 5 to 18; the program's ultimate goal was to diversify orchestras by providing a high quality musical education to minority students. During the same time period, Moore also served as an advisor to the Diversity Committee of the Boston Symphony Orchestra.

In 2004 Moore joined the Boston Ballet as director of its Center for Dance Education, the largest professional ballet school in the United States. She helped to create Adaptive Dance—dance classes for children with Down syndrome—and developed the Elder Dance program, which offered classes for senior citizens. She was also an adjunct professor in the dance department at Emerson College and taught non-profit finance in the Graduate Program in Arts Administration at Boston University.

=== 2004-2015: American Ballet Theatre, Project Plié ===
In 2004, Moore was hired as the executive director of ABT. As the fourth person to hold the position in four years, she said: "I knew I was coming in to a place that had been very unsettled. But I understand the Ballet Theatre context, what its traditions and needs are. And I never forgot what it's like to be a dancer. This can be a heartbreaking career." A year later, the New York Times wrote: "Moore has taken firm hold of an unwieldy, creaky organization that is also a great one, constantly beset by financial problems, yet somehow managing to produce the spectacular productions and dancers for which it is famous." During Moore's tenure, ABT's endowment increased from $8 million to $15 million, box office receipts went up by 30%, and ABT realized an operational profit. She was recognized for transforming the ABT brand and was appointed CEO of ABT in 2013.

While at ABT, Moore successfully lobbied the United States Congress to officially designate ABT as the National Ballet Company of the United States. She also created an international teacher training curriculum and certification program for ballet teachers that emphasized safety and well-being for children and implemented a "Healthy Dancer" initiative. In addition, she brought new works to ABT and brought ABT to the Middle East and Cuba, and developed and launched Project Plié, a program to increase diversity in professional ballet, stating that “if performing arts organizations are going to be relevant in the 21st century … then what’s on stage needs to look more like what’s in the world.”

=== 2015-present: The Music Center, The Artist's Compass ===
Moore was named President and CEO of the Music Center in October 2015. During her first six years in the position, she restructured the organization to make the arts more accessible to all Los Angeles County communities and created TMC Arts, a division that oversees the Music Center's programming, and TMC Ops, which runs operations throughout the Music Center Campus. She raised funds and oversaw the 20-month, $41 million renovation of The Music Center Plaza—now called Jerry Moss Plaza—a long-planned project that was completed in August 2019, and launched the TMC Arts Fund, which provides free and low-cost public programs and education. Moore also worked to increase the diversity of the Music Center's board of directors; its makeup went from 6% women and people of color to 33% women and people of color. In October 2019, Moore's contract was extended to 2024.

In 2020, as live performances were cancelled in response to the COVID-19 pandemic, she led The Music Center's digital programs. In October 2020, Moss and his wife, Tina, gave The Music Center $25 million, the largest gift designated for programming in The Music Center's history.

In 2016, Simon & Schuster/Touchstone published Moore's book, The Artist’s Compass: The Complete Guide to Building a Life and a Living in the Performing Arts. A guide for young artists based on Moore's experience, the book covers subjects including marketing, insurance, finding work, copyright law, finances, and healthy living.

== Selected awards and recognition ==
- American Academy of Arts and Sciences (elected 2020)
- Los Angeles Business Journal CEO of the Year (2019)
- Columbia University Distinguished Alumni Award (2006)

== Selected board and organizational affiliations ==
- Advisory council member, Ovation TV Distribution Limited, August 2020 – present
- Board member, Los Angeles Tourism and Convention Board, July 2020 – present
- Board member, Los Angeles Coalition for Jobs and Economy
- Trustee and officer, Economic Club of New York, August 2014 – present
- Arts Advisory Council Member, Brown University, November 2016 – present
- Board Member, LA 2024 Olympic Games Bid Committee, November 2016 - September 2017
- US Presidential Scholars Foundation
- Board Member, Central City Association of Los Angeles
