= Cory Stearns =

American ballet dancer (born 1985)

- Born: Paul Cornell Stearns; October 16, 1985 (age 40); Southampton, New York, U.S.
- Occupation: Ballet dancer
- Years active: 1990–present
- Height: 6 ft 0 in (183 cm)
- Career
- Current group: American Ballet Theatre

Paul Cornell "Cory" Stearns (born October 16, 1985) is an American ballet dancer who is a former principal dancer with American Ballet Theatre, one of the three leading classical ballet companies in the United States. Stearns is also a high fashion model.

== Early life and training ==
Stearns began dancing at age of three with the encouragement of his mother (who studied the Graham technique when she was younger). He began ballet training age five at the Seiskaya Ballet in St. James, New York under the direction of Mme. Valia Seiskaya, formally of the National Opera of Greece. At thirteen, Stearns received a full scholarship to Pittsburgh Ballet Theatre's summer intensive. At age fifteen, he participated in the Youth America Grand Prix and was awarded a full scholarship to study at the Royal Ballet School in London. During Stearns' time at the Royal Ballet School he performed as pop artist Kylie Minogue's dance partner in her music video for Chocolate. Stearns graduated from The Royal Ballet School in 2004 and returned to New York.

== Dance career ==
Stearns joined the Studio Company of the American Ballet Theatre (ABT) in 2004. In the 2005 he was promoted to an apprentice with ABT and to the corps de ballet in 2006. He was appointed a Soloist in January 2009 and a Principal Dancer in January 2011.

Stearns' first major role with ABT was Conrad in Le Corsaire in 2008, and roles since have included Solor in La Bayadère, Oberon in The Dream, Basilio and Espada in Don Quixote, titular role in Onegin, Romeo in Romeo and Juliet, Prince Siegfried and Von Rothbart in Swan Lake, James in La Sylphide and the Prince in Alexei Ratmansky's The Nutcracker.

In the 2013/14 season, Stearns returned to London for a guest role as the Prince in Nutcracker at The Royal Ballet.

Reviewing Cinderella, The New York Times states Stearns was "chivalrous, handsome and calmly glowing amid virtuosity."

Stearns retired in May 2026 following knee surgery.

== Modeling career ==
Stearns began his modeling career by chance in 2009 when an agent spotted him at "New Andy's Deli". Since then he has modeled for Louis Vuitton, Ramsey, and Dolce & Gabbana and has been photographed by Bruce Weber, Steven Klein, and Annie Leibovitz who shot him alongside fellow dancers Benjamin Millepied and Stella Abrera for a Vogue Magazine spread.

== Personal life ==
Stearns was raised in Mattituck, Long Island. He resides in Jersey City.

== Dance repertoire ==
- Solor in La Bayadère
- Her Prince Charming in Cinderella
- Conrad in Le Corsaire
- Basilio and Espada in Don Quixote
- Oberon in The Dream
- Études
- Colas in La Fille mal gardée
- Kaschei in The Firebird
- Albrecht in Giselle
- Grand Pas Classique
- Her Lover in Jardin aux Lilas
- Edward Rochester in Jane Eyre
- Armand Duval in Lady of the Camellias
- Des Grieux in Manon
- Beliaev in A Month in the Country
- The Nutcracker-Prince in Alexei Ratmansky's The Nutcracker
- Onegin in Onegin
- Other Dances
- Romeo and Paris in Romeo and Juliet
- Prince Désiré, the Celtic Prince and a Fairy Knight in The Sleeping Beauty
- Prince Désiré in Ratmansky's The Sleeping Beauty
- Prince Siegfried and von Rothbart in Swan Lake
- James in La Sylphide
- The Poet in Les Sylphides
- Orion and Apollo in Sylvia
- Prince Coffee in Whipped Cream
- Monotones II
- Symphony in C
- Drink to Me Only With Thine Eyes
- Dr. John Brown in Like Water for Chocolate

=== Created roles ===
- Mithridates in Of Love and Rage
- AFTERITE
- I Feel The Earth Move
- Her Notes
- Piano Concerto #1 A Time There Was
- From Here On Out
- One of Three
- Private Light

== Awards ==
- 2009 Erik Bruhn Prize for best male dance
- 2004 the Dame Ruth Railton Award for excellence in dance (Royal Ballet School)
- 2003 the Dame Ruth Railton Award for excellence in dance (Royal Ballet School)
