= Ivan Allen =

American ballet dancer (1930–2012)

- Born: June 29, 1930; Detroit, Michigan, USA
- Died: May 7, 2012 (aged 81)
- Known for: principal dancer, American Ballet Theatre solo dancer, Metropolitan Opera Ballet

Ivan G. Allen (June 29, 1930 – May 7, 2012) was an American ballet dancer who was active as a principal dancer with the American Ballet Theatre during the 1950s and early 1960s. He became a principal soloist with the Metropolitan Opera in 1964, making his debut with the company in Jules Massenet's Manon on November 18, 1964. He appeared with the company 288 times over the next 14 years, making his last appearance on January 12, 1978 in Richard Strauss's Der Rosenkavalier.

Ivan Allen died on May 7, 2012.
