= Nina Stroganova =

Danish Ballet dancer (1907 - 1994)

- Born: Nina Rigmor Strom; October 27, 1907; Copenhagen, Denmark
- Died: July 9, 1994 (aged 86); New York, United States of America
- Occupation: Prima ballerina
- Spouse: Vladimir Dokoudovsky

Nina Stroganova (October 21, 1907 - July 9, 1994) was a prima ballerina working with several ballet companies in the 1930s and 1940s.

== Early life and education ==
In her youth, Nina Rigmor Strom studied ballet at the Royal Danish Ballet. She received her education from Institute Jeanne d'Arc, a Roman Catholic school in Denmark.

She moved to Paris as a young woman to study ballet with Olga Preobrajenska, a ballet teacher from Russia, a former ballerina of the Russian Imperial Ballet. In the studio where she trained, Nina met her future husband and dancing partner, Vladimir Dokoudovsky, the son of Count Dokoudovsky of Tula, Russia.

== Career ==
Nina Rigmor Strom began her career in 1935-1936 as a ballerina in the Ballet Russe de l'Opera Comique of Paris. She was subsequently hired as a ballerina with the Ballet Russe de Monte Carlo by Leonid Massine and René Blum, who then dubbed her Nina "Stroganova."

She immigrated to The United States with her husband, Vladimir, in 1937 in order to join the Mordkin Ballet Company, where she and her husband performed together in Peter and the Wolf. In 1940, fellow dancer Lucia Chase hired her to be the prima ballerina in her new company, Ballet Theatre, later known as American Ballet Theatre.

With the onset of World War II, Nina and Vladimir joined the Original Ballet Russe company of Colonel de Basil, which toured Latin America throughout the war years, allegedly to keep the male dancers from being drafted. After the war, Nina and Vladimir settled in New York City. She performed as a guest artist at the Royal Danish Ballet, along with her husband, in Giselle and Swan Lake, Act II. She also performed as a guest ballerina with the Ballet Russe de Monte Carlo between 1950 and 1951. Nina and Vladimir headed the Stroganova-Dokoudovsky Ballet Company in several performances, including some at Jacob's Pillow, where the ballet The Abyss, featuring a commissioned score by Alexander Tcherepnin, was premiered.

They joined the faculty of the Ballet Arts school in Carnegie Hall, where they led classes with well-known figures of the dance world for many years. They later founded their own school, the New York Conservatory of Dance, now led by Patricia Heyes Dokoudovsky. Nina Stroganova also taught at School of Classical Ballet in Englewood, New Jersey and, after leaving the New York Conservatory, continued teaching noon classes at the studios of the City Center Theater for a number of years until her sudden death at the age of 78.

Students in Stroganova's noon classes included Alexandra Danilova, Eugene Collins, Gemze de Lappe, Bambi Linn, Agnes de Mille, Zizi Jeanmaire, Roland Petit, Nora Kovach, Istvan Rabovsky, Inge Sand, Toni Lander, Bruce Marks, Irina Lebedeva, Andrea Vodehnal, Michael Maule, Richard Marsden, Carl Corry, Daniel Baudendistel, Nicole Fox, Christine Dakin, Linda Giancaspro, Saul Davis, Charles Perrier, Diana Lasky, Trutti Gasparinetti, Marilyn D'Honau, and other professional and amateur dancers.

== Leading roles ==
- Lucile Grahn in Pas de Quatre, and in Capriccioso, Love Song, and Pas de Deux, all by Anton Dolin (1941)
- Mazurka in Fokine's production of Les Sylphides at Ballet Theatre
- Odette in Swan Lake (Ivanov)
- Columbine in Carnaval (Fokine)
- Ballerina in Petrouchka (Fokine)
- Tsarevna in Firebird (Fokine)
- Sugar Plum Fairy in The Nutcracker (Petipa)
- Passion and Frivolity in Les Presages (Massine)
- Russian Ballerina in Gala Performance (Tudor), in the premiere of Dark Elegies (Tudor)
- The Cat in Peter and the Wolf (Fokine)
- Pig-Tailed Girl in Graduation Ball (Lichine)

== Personal life ==
Stroganova had one daughter with Vladimir Dokoudovsky, Ludmilla. Ludmila Dokoudovsky would go on to co-direct the St. Louis Ballet Company alongside her husband, Antoni Zalewski.

Stroganova's marriage with Vladimir ended in divorce. Her partner during her later years was the danseur Kenneth MacKenzie, whom she met while on tour in the Original Ballets Russes.

== Death ==
Stroganova died of leukemia in Manhattan's Roosevelt Hospital on July 9, 1994.
