= Jacqueline Kennedy Onassis School =

Associate school of American Ballet Theatre

Location
- 890 Broadway, New York, New York; United States; 40.73838°N 73.98939°W

Information
- Established: 2004

The Jacqueline Kennedy Onassis School at American Ballet Theatre (ABT/JKO School) is the associate school of American Ballet Theatre (ABT). It is located at 890 Broadway, within the Flatiron District of Manhattan, New York City.

== History and operations ==
The school comprises a children's division for ages 4 to 12, a pre-professional division for ages 12 to 18, and the preparatory program "Studio Company" for ages 16 to 20. It was established in 2004 and named in honor of Jacqueline Kennedy Onassis who served on ABT's board of trustees as honorary chairman emerita for many years prior to her death in 1994

Besides its parent company, graduates of the school have found employment in various companies, including the National Ballet of Canada, The Royal Ballet, the Joffrey Ballet and the Dutch National Ballet.

Stella Abrera became the school's interim artistic director for a year, starting in August 2022, following Cynthia Harvey's departure in May.

=== Predecessor schools ===
Before the school was established in 2004, ABT had twice attempted to train dancers for the company, but those efforts did not result in creation of a formal dance academy. From 1952 to 1980, the American Ballet Theater School conducted classes with leading dancers, In 1967, a scholarship class was established, consisting of advanced students trained for the corps de ballet. This was abandoned by Mikhail Baryshnikov in 1982 after he became artistic director. In 1988, he started the School of Classical Ballet, with the aim of it evolving into a European-style ballet academy. The school closed for lack of funds after he left the ABT in 1989.

=== Education and training ===
Due to ABT's vast repertoire, the school's training curriculum aims to provide its students the ability to adapt to all styles and techniques of dance. The training curriculum combines elements from the classic French, Russian, and Italian styles of training, and it encompasses classical-ballet technique, pointe technique, partnering, character, modern technique, variations and pilates. Students also participate in the "JKO Wellness Lecture Series", which educates the dancers on topics, including nutrition, women's health, stress management, strength training, resume writing and career preparation.

Each spring, all ABT/JKO School students perform in one annual performance of ABT repertory and original choreography created by the faculty. Select students are chosen for other various performances throughout the year and are also given the opportunity to perform in ABT's production of The Nutcracker.

=== Studio Company ===
ABT Studio Company, formerly known as ABT II, is a small company of twelve young dancers, ranging from ages 16 to 20, handpicked by ABT. It is an extension of the ABT JKO school. These dancers are trained in the program to join ABT's main company or other leading professional companies, and the program is described by ABT as "a bridge between ballet training and professional performance". While the dancers study intensively and learn the company repertoire, they also gain various performance experiences via cultural exchanges, regional touring, and residencies. All of the dancers learn Alexei Ratmansky's The Nutcracker, and a select group are chosen to perform the ballet when the company holds performances at the Brooklyn Academy of Music.

=== Notable alumni ===
- Kelly Bishop
- Isabella Boylston
- Dusty Button
- Herman Cornejo
- Michaela DePrince
- David Hallberg
- Yuriko Kajiya
- Tony Mordente (predecessor school)
- Hee Seo
- Cory Stearns
- Devon Teuscher

=== Notable faculty ===
- Stella Abrera
- Franco De Vita
- Martine van Hamel
- Julie Kent
- Carlos Lopez
- Kevin McKenzie
- Lupe Serrano

=== Summer Intensive ===
ABT offers a five-week program designed to develop well-rounded, versatile dancers. It combines various disciplines, with an emphasis on classical ballet and ABT's "National Training Curriculum".

== See also ==
- Ballet training
- Dance education in the United States
