= Susan Jaffe =

American ballerina

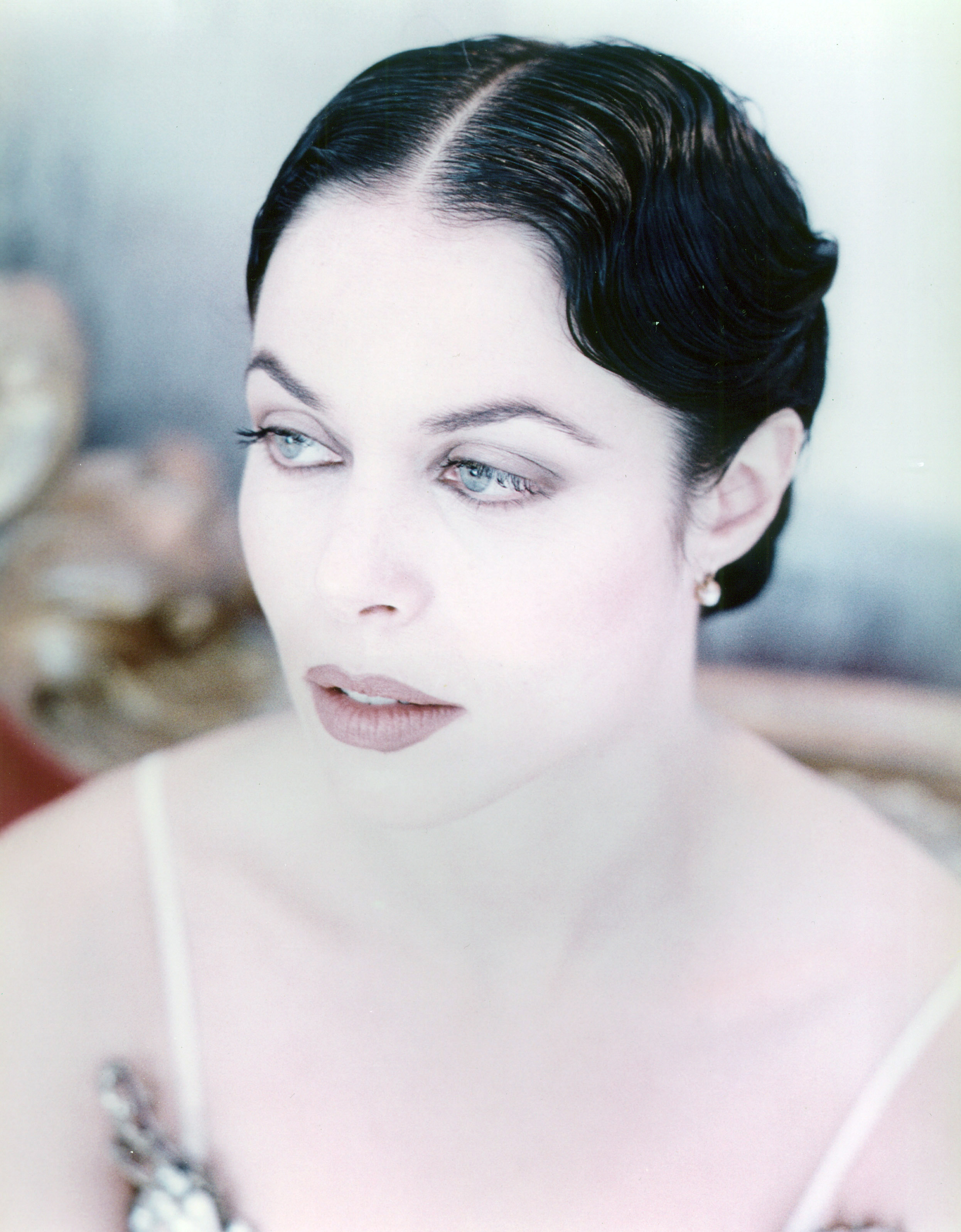
- Born: 1962 (age 63–64); Washington, D.C., U.S.
- Occupation: Ballet dancer
- Years active: 1980–2002
- Dancing career
- Current group: American Ballet Theatre

Susan Jaffe (born 1962) is an American ballet dancer and arts administrator. She is currently the artistic director of the American Ballet Theatre, where she had danced for 22 years and held the rank of principal dancer. She previously served as the dean of the School of Dance at the University of North Carolina School of the Arts and the artistic director of Pittsburgh Ballet Theatre.

== Career ==
Jaffe studied ballet at the Maryland Youth Ballet, the School of American Ballet, and the American Ballet Theatre (ABT) School.

At age 16, she became a member of ABT II and joined ABT's corps de ballet at age 18. Mikhail Baryshnikov, ABT's artistic director at the time, pulled Jaffe out of the corps de ballet to replace Gelsey Kirkland in a gala performance. With two days of rehearsal, Jaffe danced Pas d'Esclave at the Kennedy Center in Washington with the late Alexander Godunov, a Bolshoi Ballet star whose former dance partner had been Maya Plisetskaya. Jaffe remained a principal dancer with ABT for the following 22 years.

Jaffe has danced many roles: Odette/Odile (she danced her first Swan Lake at the age of 19), Kitri (Don Quixote), Nikiya & Gamzatti (La Bayadère), Aurora (The Sleeping Beauty), Juliet (Romeo and Juliet), Swanhilda (Coppélia), Tatiana (John Cranko's Onegin), Kate (Taming of the Shrew), and the title roles in Giselle, La Sylphide and Kenneth MacMillan's Anastasia and Manon.

Jaffe has worked with and performed the repertoire of many of the 20th century's most prominent choreographers, including George Balanchine, Antony Tudor, Kenneth MacMillan, Jerome Robbins, Roland Petit, Twyla Tharp, Nacho Duato, Jiří Kylián, and James Kudelka.

While still dancing with ABT, Jaffe became an international guest artist for the Royal Opera House of Covent Garden, the Mariinsky Theatre, the English National Ballet, La Scala Ballet in Milan, Bavarian State Opera, Royal Danish Ballet, Royal Swedish Ballet, Stuttgart Ballet, and the Vienna State Opera Ballet.

Jaffe was Advisor to the Chairman of ABT's Board of Governing Trustees from 2002 to 2007, and was on the faculty of the Jacqueline Kennedy Onassis School from 2002 to 2010. Jaffe co-founded Long Island University's educational initiative for the dancers of the American Ballet Theatre. Jaffe lectures for Duke Corporate Education on "Excellence". In 2003, Jaffe co-founded and co-directed Princeton Dance & Theater Studio in Princeton, NJ. She has taught master classes throughout the United States and Japan.

Susan Jaffe is a Dance Magazine awardee, and was invited to join Dance Magazine to co-produce and host the weekly television show Dance New York. She has been featured multiple times on the PBS series Dance in America; in the movie, Angie, starring Geena Davis; and in the Frederick Wiseman documentary Ballet.

In 2002, Jaffe was a guest on the Charlie Rose Show, where she discussed her retirement from the stage. In 2003, her book for children 7 to 13, Becoming a Ballerina, was published by Universe.

Jaffe has choreographed for dance companies and universities internationally. In 2007, she joined Configuration Dance Theatre Artistic Director, Joseph Cipolla, and Resident Choreographer, Michael Shannon, as Principal Guest Choreographer and Member of the National Advisory Board. Configuration Dance Theatre has premiered three Jaffe works in New York, Velez Pas de Deux in Fall 2007, Novem Pas de Deux in Spring 2008, and Royenne Pas de Deux in Spring 2009.

In the Fall of 2008, Jaffe's work, Uncaged, was premiered in concert at the School for Classical & Contemporary Dance at Texas Christian University in Fort Worth. She created Pulse as Guest Choreographer at Princeton University in 2010. In 2011, she created two new works for the Studio Company of American Ballet Theatre, called "We Insist" and "A Tango".

In 2012, Jaffe choreographed a new pas de deux called "Blue" for American Ballet Theatre's gala for the opening night of their Metropolitan Opera House Season. The year 2013 brought a new contemporary work created for the students at University of North Carolina's School of the Arts by Jaffe, Polovtsian Dances, which premiered in Chapel Hill's celebration of the 100th anniversary of the Rite of Spring.

In January 2014, Jaffe premiered a new work for Company C Contemporary Ballet called "Weather One", which premiered in the Lesher Center in Walnut Creek, California followed by a weekend of performances in February 2014 at the Yerba Buena Center in San Francisco.
