= Erica Cornejo =

Argentine ballet dancer (born c. 1978)

- Born: 1978 or 1979 (age 46–47); San Luis, Argentina
- Education: Colon Theater Superior Institute of Art
- Occupation: ballet dancer
- Spouse: Carlos Molina
- Children: 1
- Career
- Former groups: Ballet Argentino; American Ballet Theatre; Boston Ballet

Erica Cornejo (born 1978/79) is an Argentine ballet dancer who was a principal dancer with the Boston Ballet.

== Early life ==
Cornejo was born in San Luis, Argentina and raised in Buenos Aires. Her younger brother, Herman Cornejo, is currently a principal dancer with the American Ballet Theatre. She started ballet at age four, and later trained at the Colon Theater Superior Institute of Art.

== Career ==
In 1994, she joined Julio Bocca's touring troupe, Ballet Argentino, where she became a principal ballerina and one of Bocca's dance partners. In 1998, when the company was performing in New York, the Cornejos siblings performed a tango titled El Chamuyo, and took classes with the American Ballet Theatre. After that, the two were invited to join the Studio Company. She became a member of the corps de ballet the same year and was promoted to soloist in 2003. She left ABT in 2006 to join the Boston Ballet as a principal dancer. She retired from the company in 2017. In 2019, to celebrate Herman Cornejo's 20th anniversary with ABT, Erica returned to ABT to dance El Chamuyo.

Cornejo opened a dance studio in Boston called Integrarte with her husband and former Boston Ballet principal dancer Carlos Molina.

== Personal life ==
Cornejo is married to Carlos Molina, a fellow Boston Ballet principal dancer, whom she met in ABT. They have a child.
