= Yuriko Kajiya =

Japanese ballet dancer

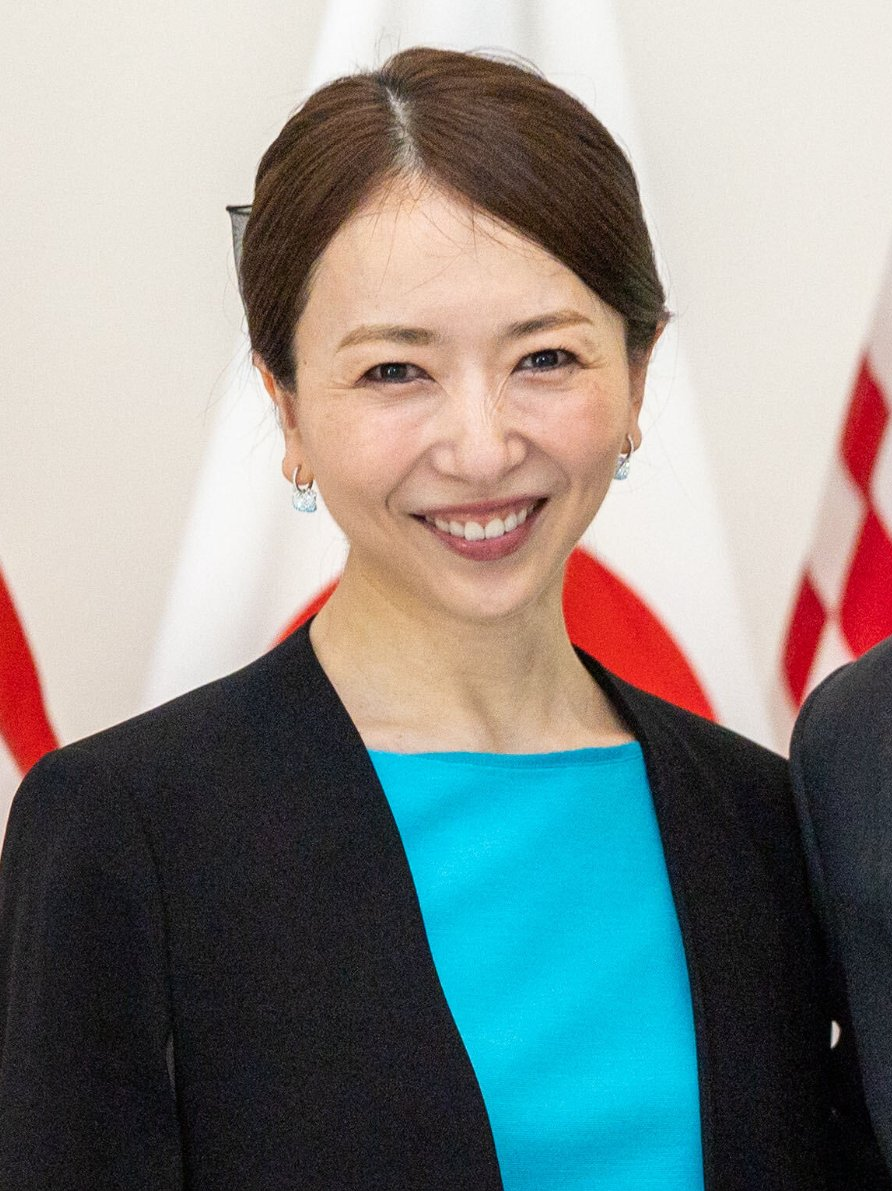
- Kajiya in November 2024
- Born: June 25, 1984 (age 42); Nagoya, Japan
- Education: Shanghai Ballet, National Ballet of Canada
- Occupation: Ballet dancer
- Years active: 2001–present
- Career
- Current group: Houston Ballet

Yuriko Kajiya (加治屋百合子 Kajiya Yuriko, born 1984) is a Japanese ballet dancer who currently performs as a principal dancer with Houston Ballet. Prior to joining Houston Ballet, she danced as a soloist with American Ballet Theatre for seven years.

== Early life ==
Yuriko was born in Nagoya, Japan, and started training with Matsumoto Michiko Ballet when she was eight years old. She moved to China at the age of 10, where she studied with and graduated from the school of the Shanghai Ballet. She won the Best Performance Award in the senior category at the Tao Li Bei National Ballet Competition in 1997, at age 13. In 1999, she was a finalists at the Third International Ballet Competition, held in Nagoya. She won a Prix de Lausanne in January 2000, allowing her to continue her training with the school of the National Ballet of Canada in Toronto.

== Career ==
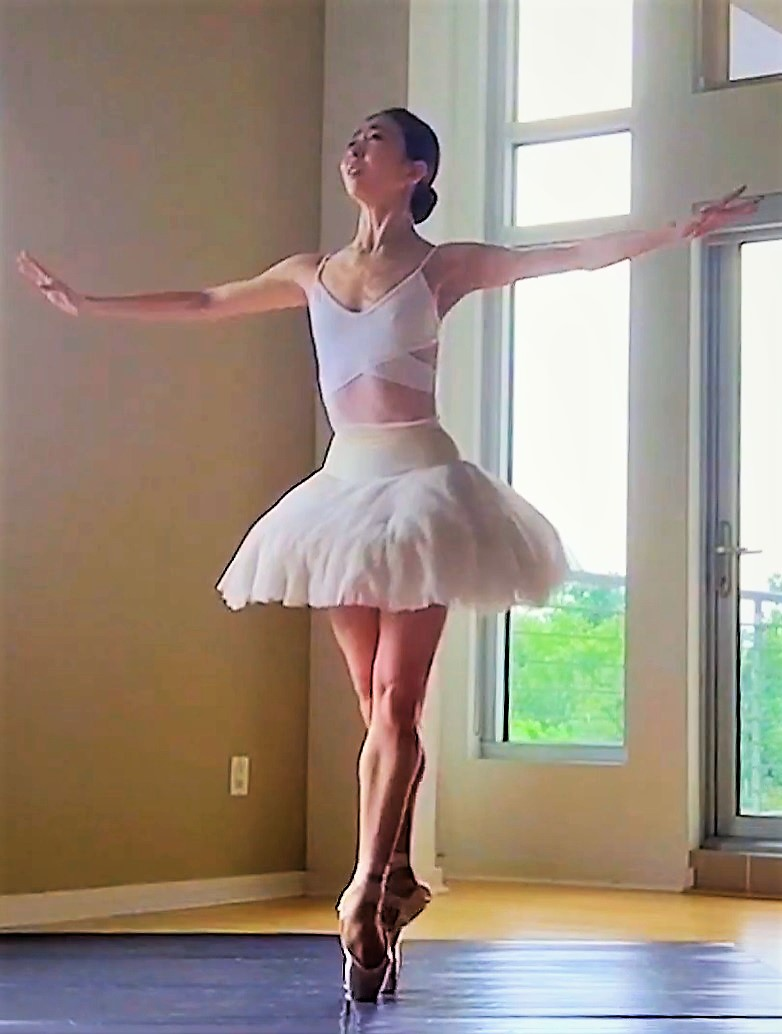
Kajiya dances for Swans for Relief in 2020

She joined the ABT Studio Company in September 2001, joined ABT's main company as an apprentice in 2002, and became a member of the corps de ballet in June 2002. Effective August 2007, she was promoted to the rank of soloist.

Her repertoire at ABT included Kitri in Don Quixote, Giselle in Giselle, Gamzatti in La Bayadére, Gulnare in Le Corsaire, Clara, the Princess in Alexei Ratmansky's The Nutcracker, Olga in Onegin, Lilac Fairy and Princess Florine in The Sleeping Beauty, the Waltz in Les Sylphides, Miranda in The Tempest, Tchaikovsky Pas de Deux and leading roles in Ballo Della Regina, Brief Fling, In the Upper Room, The Leaves are Fading, Petite Mort, Rabbit and Rogue, Seven Sonatas, Baker’s Dozen, Chamber Symphony and Theme and Variations.

Kajiya left ABT to join Houston Ballet as a first soloist in 2014. She gave her final performance with the company with a debut in the starring role of Swanilda in Coppélia. Her partner for that performance was Joseph Gorak. Kajiya joined Houston Ballet with her life partner Jared Matthews to pursue great artistic opportunities. In November 2014, after only 5 months with the company, she was promoted to principal dancer following her performance in Ben Stevenson's The Nutcracker. Since that time she boosted her repertoire, dancing all of the leading roles within the company with major role debuts in choreography by company director, Stanton Welch. Her repertoire now includes Kenneth McMillan's Manon and Mayerling, William Forsythe's Artifact Suite, and Stanton Welch's Giselle, Madame Butterfly, The Nutcracker, La Bayadere, Paquita, and Swan Lake.

== Other work ==
Kajiya starred in the 2007 documentary Passion Across a Continent and the 2011 documentary Yuriko: Ballerina which aired on MBS in Japan. In July 2010, she appeared on an episode of the American television series So You Think You Can Dance, alongside her partner and fellow soloist Jared Matthews. In 2012, she received an Artistic Ambassador Award from the government of Japan.
