= Herman Cornejo =

Argentine-born ballet dancer

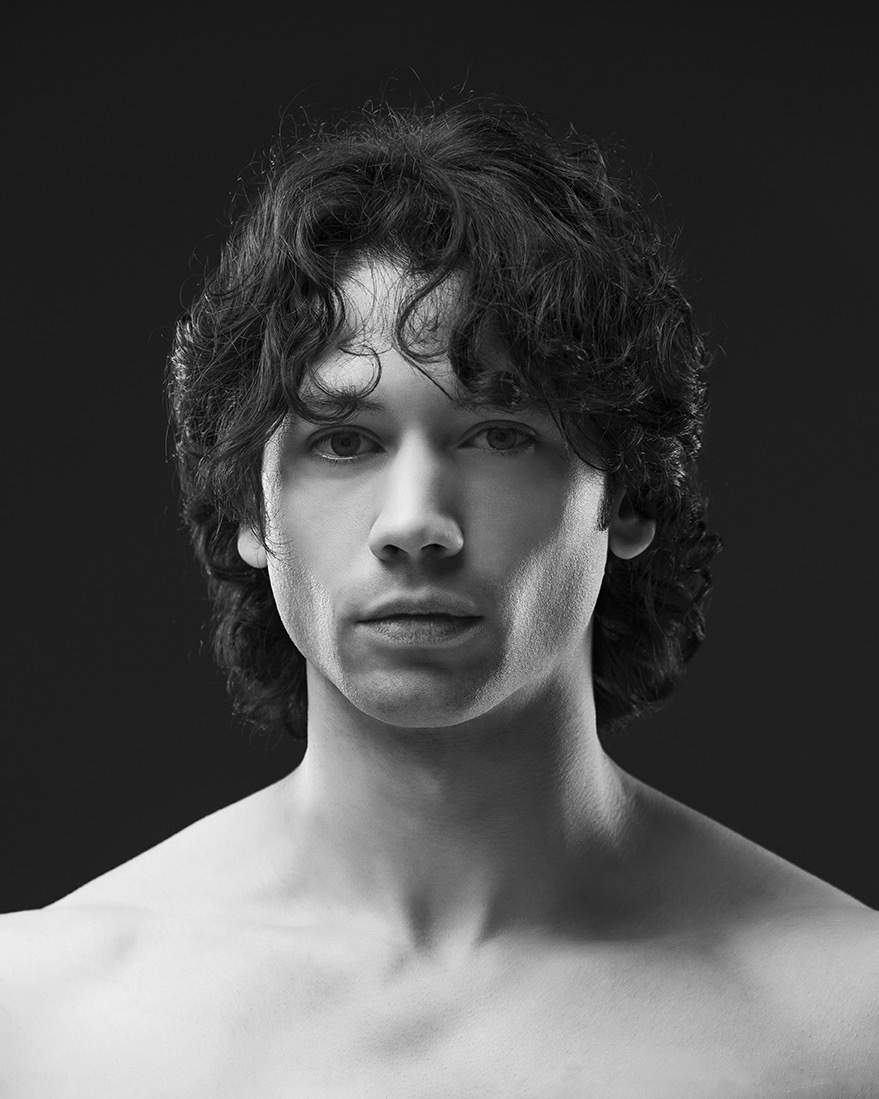
- Born: 13 May 1981 (age 45); Villa Mercedes, Argentina
- Occupation: Ballet dancer
- Years active: 1999–present
- Spouse(s): María José Lavandera (m. 2019); Carmen Corella (divorced)
- Dancing career
- Current group: American Ballet Theatre

Herman Cornejo (born 13 May 1981) is an Argentine-born ballet dancer and a principal dancer with the American Ballet Theatre. He has had leading roles created for him by Alexei Ratmansky and Twyla Tharp; his signature roles include Puck in A Midsummer Night's Dream, Mercutio in Romeo and Juliet, and the leading male role in Ratmansky's Symphony No. 9.

He won a Bessie Award in 2013, and the Prix Benois de la Danse in 2014. In 2004, Joan Acocella called Cornejo "the most technically accomplished male ballet dancer in the United States." He was described by critic Claudia La Rocco as "not a fairy-tale prince," but "something more interesting, and more useful, really, for ballet: a believable, 21st-century hero."

== Career ==
=== Education ===
Cornejo was born in Villa Mercedes and raised in a suburb of Buenos Aires. After early ice skating lessons, at the age of eight he was introduced to ballet by his older sister, Erica Cornejo, who later became a principal dancer with the Boston Ballet. Cornejo enrolled in the school of the Teatro Colón in Buenos Aires at age 9. At 14, he began studying at the School of American Ballet on a full scholarship, and subsequently left to join Julio Bocca's Ballet Argentino.

At 16, he placed first at the Eighth International Moscow Competition, becoming the youngest winner in the history of the competition. In 1998, aged 17, he joined the ABT Studio Company as an apprentice.

=== Professional career ===
In 1999, at the ABT, Cornejo was chosen for the role of the Bronze Idol in Makarova's production of La Bayadère in Japan. Soon after, in 2000, he was promoted to the rank of soloist, and in 2003 became a Principal Dancer. Since then, he has danced many major roles; signature roles include Puck in A Midsummer Night's Dream, Mercutio in Romeo and Juliet, and the leading male role in Ratmansky's Symphony No. 9.

Cornejo has worked with a number of choreographers. Major roles have been created on him by Alexei Ratmansky, Mauro Bigonzetti, Trey McIntyre, Jorma Elo, Twyla Tharp, and Martha Clarke, among others. Cornejo has also choreographed several pieces for himself.

More recently, he has collaborated with Italian ballerina Alessandra Ferri, after they starred together in a 2013 ABT production. This collaboration led to other projects, including the 2016 production "TRIO ConcertDance". In 2015, Cornejo was the artistic director of the Latin American Stars Gala, part of the Performing Arts Center of Los Angeles County's 50th anniversary celebrations.

In 2014, Cornejo was awarded the Prix Benois de la Danse for Outstanding Male Dancer, for his portrayals of Aminta in Sylvia, Caliban in The Tempest and a leading role in Symphony #9, as well as for his appearance in Martha Clarke’s Chéri.

In October 2019, Cornejo celebrated his 20th anniversary with ABT with a special performance at the Lincoln Center, including George Balanchine's Apollo with Cornejo's frequent partner, Misty Copeland, El Chamuyo with his sister and former Boston Ballet principal dancer, Erica Cornejo, and Twyla Tharp's new work, A Gathering of Ghosts.

Cornejo has performed as a guest artist with numerous companies around the world, including Ballet Estable del Teatro Colón, La Scala Ballet, Universal Ballet of Korea, National Ballet of Japan, Kremlin Ballet, Dortmund Ballett, New York City Ballet, Boston Ballet, Pennsylvania Ballet, Martha Graham Company, Ballet Hispánico, Ballet Contemporáneo de Cuba and Corella Ballet Castilla y León.

== Selected repertoire ==
- The title role in Apollo
- Solor and the Bronze Idol in La Bayadère
- The Jester in Ben Stevenson’s Cinderella
- Franz in Coppélia
- Conrad, Ali, Lankendem and Birbanto in Le Corsaire
- Basilio and the lead gypsy in Don Quixote
- Puck in The Dream
- Colas and Alain in La Fille mal gardée
- Ivan in Alexei Ratmansky’s The Firebird
- Albrecht and the peasant pas de deux in Giselle
- Des Grieux and Lescaut in Manon
- The Maitre D' in The Merry Widow
- The Nutcracker-Prince and the Cavalier in Kevin McKenzie’s The Nutcracker
- The Nutcracker-Prince in Alexei Ratmansky’s The Nutcracker
- Other Dances
- The title role in Petrouchka
- Abderakman and Bernard in Raymonda
- Romeo and Mercutio in Romeo and Juliet
- Sinatra Suite
- Prince Désiré and the Bluebird in The Sleeping Beauty
- The Rose in Le Spectre de la Rose
- Prince Siegfried, Benno and the Neapolitan dance in Swan Lake
- James and Gurn in La Sylphide
- Aminta and Eros in Sylvia
- The third movement in Symphony in C
- Tschaikovsky Pas de Deux
- The Boy in Whipped Cream
- Lead role in Theme and Variations
- Petite Mort
- Pedro Múzquiz in Like Water for Chocolate

=== Created roles ===
- The Host in Ghost Catcher
- Fortune in HereAfter
- Rabbit in Rabbit and Rogue
- Caliban in The Tempest
- "I Dig Love" in Within You Without You: A Tribute to George Harrison
- AFTERITE
- The Brahms-Haydn Variations
- C. to C. (Close to Chuck)
- Concerto No. 1 for Piano and Orchestra
- Garden Blue
- Glow – Stop
- I Feel The Earth Move
- Pretty Good Year
- Serenade After Plato’s Symposium
- Seven Sonatas
- Symphony

== Critical reception ==
Cornejo has earned international recognition as a soloist. In 2005, he was appointed a "Messenger of Peace" by UNESCO and "Dancer of the Year" by The New York Times; he won a Bessie Award in 2013. In 2014, he won the "Best Male Dancer" award of the international Prix Benois de la Danse, along with the Positano Prize in Italy.

In a 2004 profile in The New Yorker, critic Joan Acocella called Cornejo "the most technically accomplished male ballet dancer in the United States" even though, she noted, he is unusually short for a male principal. Critic John Rockwell wrote in The New York Times: "What makes Mr. Cornejo great is that his stunts don't look like stunts but like beautiful dancing." The NYT's chief dance critic, Alastair Macaulay, praised his artistic range in 2016: "His jumps' height and his turns' speed matter less than their windblown, tilting ecstasy and shining, boyish fervor. How can this paragon of adolescent lyricism also be the mature prince or witty imp we see in other ballets?" In the Los Angeles Times in 2013, Susan Reiter wrote: "Cornejo has elegantly and boldly left expectations behind. The phenomenal technique continues to amaze, but he always uses it to express the essence of each role." Critic Gia Kourlas called "Momentum", a piece Cornejo choreographed to music by Philip Glass, an "unpretentious exploration of his clean virtuosity." He generally attracts enthusiastic applause, indicating his popular appeal.

Cornejo is 5 feet 6 inches (1.68 m) tall, unusually short for a male ballet dancer. Traditional ballet roles cast short male dancers in minor or comical parts, and Cornejo was given such parts early in his career; critics called for him to be given larger roles, in recognition of his technical ability and popularity, and he was eventually cast in many lead roles as his career progressed. Cornejo has remarked that he feels "much bigger" than others perceive him, enjoying "big, slow" adagio choreography as well as the quicker movements generally assigned to smaller dancers.

== Personal life ==
Cornejo was married to Carmen Corella, a professional dancer from Spain and the sister of Ángel Corella, the founder and director of the Corella Ballet.

Cornejo is now married to an Argentine journalist, they have a child and are living in the Bronx, New York City.

Cornejo enjoys drawing as a hobby.

In 2022, Cornejo became an honoree of the Carnegie Corporation of New York's Great Immigrant Award.
