= Devon Teuscher =

American ballet dancer

- Born: 1989 (age 36–37); Pennsylvania, US
- Occupation: Ballet dancer
- Years active: 2007–present
- Career
- Current group: American Ballet Theatre
- Dances: Ballet

Devon Teuscher (born 1989) is an American ballet dancer. She is a principal dancer in the American Ballet Theatre.

== Early life ==
Teuscher began her dance training at the age of nine. As a student, Teuscher attended The Kirov Academy of Ballet, Pacific Northwest Ballet, and American Ballet Theatre’s Summer Intensive. In January 2005, at the age of 15, Teuscher started to study at American Ballet Theatre’s Jacqueline Kennedy Onassis School on full scholarship.

== Career ==
Teuscher joined ABT Studio Company in 2006 where she danced several leading roles. She joined American Ballet Theatre as an apprentice in December 2007 and was promoted to the corps de ballet six months later. She was then promoted to a Soloist in August 2014. Alexei Ratmansky selected Teuscher originate the sole woman in his new work, Serenade after Plato’s Symposium, which debuted in 2016. Teuscher received the Leonore Annenberg Arts Fellowship in 2016. One of Teuscher’s first principle role is Odette/Odile in Swan Lake, which the New York Times wrote that she was “the complete package, a mixture of astonishing technique, grandeur and ease.”

Teuscher became a Principal Dancer at the American Ballet Theatre in September 2017. On her debut as Juliet in Romeo and Juliet, The Times called her "a beautiful dancer capable of classicism, repose, lyricism and ardor." Reviewing her performance as Jane Eyre's titular role, The Times noted that Teuscher "even standing half a second too long in the pose, even in a “Jane Eyre” that gets lost in the mist — can give off a glow." Teuscher played the role of Myrta in the American Ballet Theatre's Giselle in 2021. In 2023, Teuscher again performed the role of Juliet in Romeo and Juliet performing "flawlessly."

== Selected repertoire ==
Teuscher's repertory with the American Ballet Theatre includes:

- Polyhymnia – Apollo
- A leading role – Bach Partita
- Nikiya and a Shade – La Bayadère
- Summer Fairy and Fairy Godmother – Cinderella
- Aurora and Lead Mazurka/Czardas – Coppélia
- Medora and Gulnare – Le Corsaire
- Mercedes, the Dryad Queen and a Flower Girl – Don Quixote
- The title role – The Firebird
- Myrta – Giselle
- Pierrette – Harlequinade
- The title role – Jane Eyre
- Caroline – Jardin aux Lilas
- Spanish Dancer and one of the Nutcracker’s Sisters – Alexei Ratmansky’s The Nutcracker
- Juliet, Rosaline’s friend and Lady Capulet – Romeo and Juliet
- Lilac Fairy and Diamond Fairy – Ratmansky’s Sleeping Beauty
- Odette/Odile, the pas de trois, Spanish Princess and a big swan – Swan Lake
- Terpsichore and Diana – Sylvia
- Princess Tea Flower – Whipped Cream
- Symphonic Variations
- Theme and Variations

=== Created roles ===
- Fairy Candide (Sincerity) – Alexei Ratmansky’s Sleeping Beauty
- After You
- Her Notes
- I Feel The Earth Move
- New American Romance
- Praedicere
- Serenade after Plato’s Symposium
- A Time There Was and With a Chance of Rain
