= Cynthia Harvey =

American ballet dancer and educator

- Born: May 17, 1957 (age 67); San Rafael, California, U.S.
- Occupations: ballet dancer; ballet mistress; educator
- Children: 1
- Career
- Former groups: American Ballet Theatre; The Royal Ballet; Jacqueline Kennedy Onassis School

Cynthia Harvey (born May 17, 1957) is an American former ballet dancer, ballet mistress and educator. She joined the American Ballet Theatre (ABT) in 1974 and was promoted to principal dancer in 1982. In 1986, she joined The Royal Ballet, becoming the company's first American principal dancer. She returned to ABT two years later, and retired in 1996. She then started teaching and staging ballets across the world. Between 2016 and 2022, she was the artistic director of the Jacqueline Kennedy Onassis School, the affiliated school of ABT.

== Early life and training ==
Harvey was born on May 17, 1957, in San Rafael, California, and raised in Novato. Her parents are divorced. Her mother, who is of Mexican descent, was an office manager. When she was ten, she attended a summer ballet class at a local YMCA. Recognising her talents, the teacher suggested Harvey's mother to have her train for ballet seriously. Harvey then trained with a local teacher, while spending summers at the San Francisco Ballet School and School of American Ballet on scholarship, and performed with both local and visiting ballet companies. She also attended San Marin High School. When she was fifteen, she auditioned for the American Ballet Theatre's school when the company was touring in California. She was accepted, and unusually, she was given a scholarship that covered both ballet and academics. She moved to New York by herself, and trained for nine months before becoming an apprentice with the company.

== Career ==
=== 1974–1996: as dancer ===
In 1974, at sixteen, Harvey joined the American Ballet Theatre. She made her company debut as a page in a one-act version of The Sleeping Beauty, and was often cast by choreographers Twyla Tharp and Glen Tetley. In 1977, she volunteered to assist Mikhail Baryshnikov, the artistic director of the company, to choreograph his version of Don Quixote. Baryshnikov choreographed his first ideas on Harvey and a few other volunteers. He also cast her as a flower girl in the ballet. The following year, she substituted principal dancers Martine van Hamel and Cynthia Gregory in Don Quixote as Kitri, to positive reviews, and was promoted to soloist. In 1979, she made her debut as Myrta in Giselle. In 1980, when Natalia Makarova staged her version of La Bayadère, Harvey was chosen to dance the role of Gamzatti at the premiere.

Harvey was named principal dancer in 1982. The following year, she created a role in McFall's Interludes. The lead roles she had danced with the company include Odette-Odile in Swan Lake, the title role in Giselle, Nikiya in La Bayadère, Juliet in MacMillan's Romeo and Juliet, the title role in Baryshnikov's Cinderella, as well as in Paquita and Les Sylphides.

In 1986, Harvey left the American Ballet Theatre to join The Royal Ballet in London, and became the company's first American principal dancer. The invitation came from Anthony Dowell, the director of the Royal Ballet who had danced with Harvey at ABT. Though she was initially hesitant with the invitation, she accepted it after Baryshnikov told her she would regret rejecting the offer. At the Royal Ballet, she performed various classical ballets, works choreographed by Frederick Ashton, and originated a role in Bintley's Still Life at the Penguin Café. Though she was originally set to spend a year in London, she did not return to ABT until 1988. However, she made guest appearances with the Royal Ballet after her departure.

Throughout her career, she also performed with other companies as a guest artist, including Baryshnikov and Company, Nureyev and Friends, Northern Ballet Theatre and Sadler's Wells Royal Ballet. In 1996, Harvey retired from ABT. However, her last performance was with the San Francisco Opera, in a gala performance of Johann Strauss II's operetta Die Fledermaus.

=== 1996–present: as ballet mistress and educator ===
After her retirement from dancing, Harvey started working as a guest ballet mistress and teacher. In 2008, she assisted in a restaging of The Sleeping Beauty for the Norwegian National Ballet, then returned to the company the following year to make her production of Giselle. In 2010, she created her version of The Sleeping Beauty for Hong Kong Ballet. In 2015, she staged the "Kingdom of the Shades" scene from La Bayadère for the Royal Ballet of Flanders, as well as a production of Don Quixote for Singapore Dance Theatre. She also assisted Natalia Makarova in staging La Bayadère.

Harvey has taught at companies such as ABT, The Australian Ballet, La Scala Ballet, Royal Swedish Ballet, Dresden Semperoper Ballett and Royal Ballet of Flanders, and schools including Royal Ballet School and English National Ballet School. She founded the London-based ballet nonprofit, En Avant Foundation. She was also a standard assessor for The Council for Dance Education and Training before she stepped down in 2010, and a coach at Prix de Lausanne. She was a head of the jury at the Prix de Lausanne ballet competition in 2015.

She co-wrote the book Physics of Dance & the Pas de Deux.

In 2016, Harvey was appointed artistic director of the Jacqueline Kennedy Onassis School, the affiliated school of ABT, succeeding Franco De Vita. She stepped down from the Jacqueline Kennedy Onassis School in May 2022. She continues to teach, coach and stage ballets, and became a consultant for To the Pointe, a British arts management company. In 2023, Harvey was named associate guest répétiteur at the English National Ballet.

== Personal life ==
Harvey has a child. She moved to England after she retired from performing. Prior to her joining the Jacqueline Kennedy Onassis School, she was based in Norwich.
