= American Ballet Theatre =

Ballet company

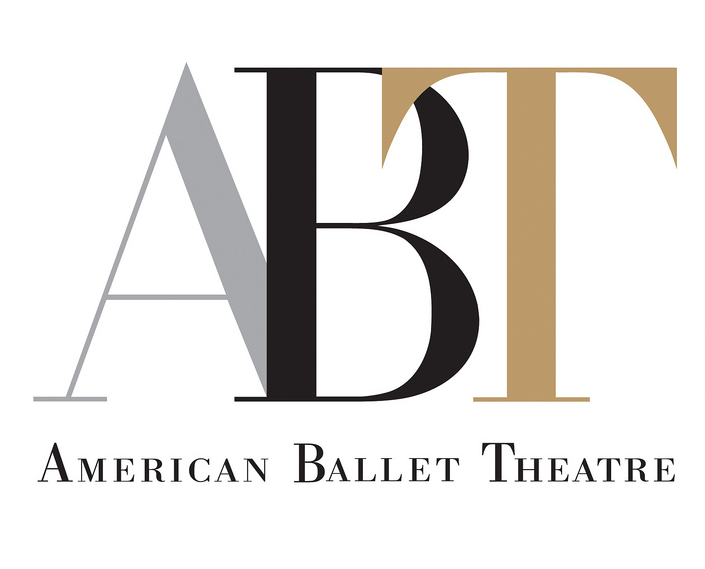

General information
- Name: American Ballet Theatre
- Previous names: Ballet Theatre
- Year founded: 1939; 87 years ago
- Principal venue: Metropolitan Opera House; New York City
- Website: abt.org

Senior staff
- Executive director: Barry Hughson

Artistic staff
- Artistic director: Susan Jaffe

Other
- Associated schools: Jacqueline Kennedy Onassis School
- Formation: Principal; Soloists; Corps de ballet; Apprentice

American Ballet Theatre (ABT) is a classical ballet company based in New York City, founded in 1939 by Lucia Chase and Richard Pleasant. Through 2019, it had an annual eight-week season at the Metropolitan Opera House (Lincoln Center) in the spring and a shorter season at the David H. Koch Theater in the fall; the company tours around the world the rest of the year. The company was scheduled to have a 5-week spring season at the MET preceded by a 2-week season at the Koch Theater beginning in 2020. ABT is the parent company of the American Ballet Theatre Jacqueline Kennedy Onassis School, and was recognized as "America's National Ballet Company" in 2006 by the United States Congress.

== History ==
In 1939 Pleasant and Chase committed to the creation of "a large scale company with an eclectic repertory". The pair and a small group from Mordkin Ballet formed Ballet Theatre. Their new company's first performance was on 11 January 1940. Chase began developing the company's repertoire of well-known full-length ballets, as well as original works, amidst financial issues. In 1945 Oliver Smith joined Ballet Theatre and became co-director with Chase.

In 1957 the company changed its name to American Ballet Theatre. It continued to emphasize ballet classics, yet remained challenged by financial issues. During the 1960s and 1970s, the company's prospects brightened due to more favorable private funding. During this period, American Ballet Theatre shifted its ballet focus to the recruitment of star performers. In 1977, the company began its spring season at the Metropolitan Opera House, its new official venue.

Mikhail Baryshnikov in 1980 became artistic director for American Ballet Theatre. Baryshnikov staged, restaged, and refurbished numerous classical ballets and, according to the company, strengthened their classical tradition. Baryshnikov was replaced in 1989 by Jane Hermann and Oliver Smith, who remained as artistic directors until 1992, when Kevin McKenzie received the appointment. McKenzie satisfied the demands of the traditional ballet audience by prioritizing full-length narrative ballets. He also succeeded in keeping the company afloat during financially unstable times. In 2004 he established an official associate ballet school, the Jacqueline Kennedy Onassis School. After a long period of no in-house choreographer, McKenzie appointed Alexei Ratmansky as "Artist in Residence" in January 2009.

McKenzie stepped down from the company in late 2022, as announced in 2021. Susan Jaffe took over the company at the end of 2022. Ratmansky departed the troupe in June 2023.

== Artistic staff ==
=== Artistic directors ===
- Lucia Chase and Oliver Smith (1940–1980)
- Mikhail Baryshnikov (1980–1989)
- Jane Hermann and Oliver Smith (1989–1992)
- Kevin McKenzie (1992–2022)
- Susan Jaffe (2022–present)

=== Executive director and CEO ===
- Rachel S. Moore Executive director (2003–2011) CEO (2011–2016)

=== Executive director ===
- Kara Medoff Barnett (2016–2021)
- Janet Rollé (2021–2023)
- Barry Hughson (2024–present)

=== Resident choreographers ===
- Antony Tudor (1940–1950)
- Alexei Ratmansky (2009–2023)

=== Music directors, conductors, concertmasters (partial list) ===
- Joseph Levine, (1911–1994) (conductor and musical director) (1950–1958)
- Ormsby Wilkins (music director) (current)
- Charles Barker (principal conductor) (current)
- David LaMarche (conductor) (current)
- Benjamin Bowman (concertmaster) (current)

== Production Department ==
- Abe Fender, Technical Director (1940)
- Michel Delaroff, Production Manager (1951-1952)
- Nananne Porcher, Technical Director (1959, 1976-1977))
- Daryl Dodson, Technical Director (1964-1967)
- George Bardyguine, Technical Director (1971-1973)
- Dan Butt, Production Manager (1979-1976)
- Lawerence Sterner, Assistant Production Manager (1981-1992)
- David G. Lansky, Assistant Production Manager (1994-1995), Production Manager (1996-2005)
- N. James Whitehill III, Associate Production Manager (1996-2005) Director of Production (2006-2023)
- Richard Koch, Technical Director (2013-current)
- Sidney Wolf, Assistant Production Manager (2017-2019)

== Dancers ==
American Ballet Theatre has four levels within the company. They are (in ascending order): apprentice, corps de ballet, soloist, and principal.

=== Principals ===
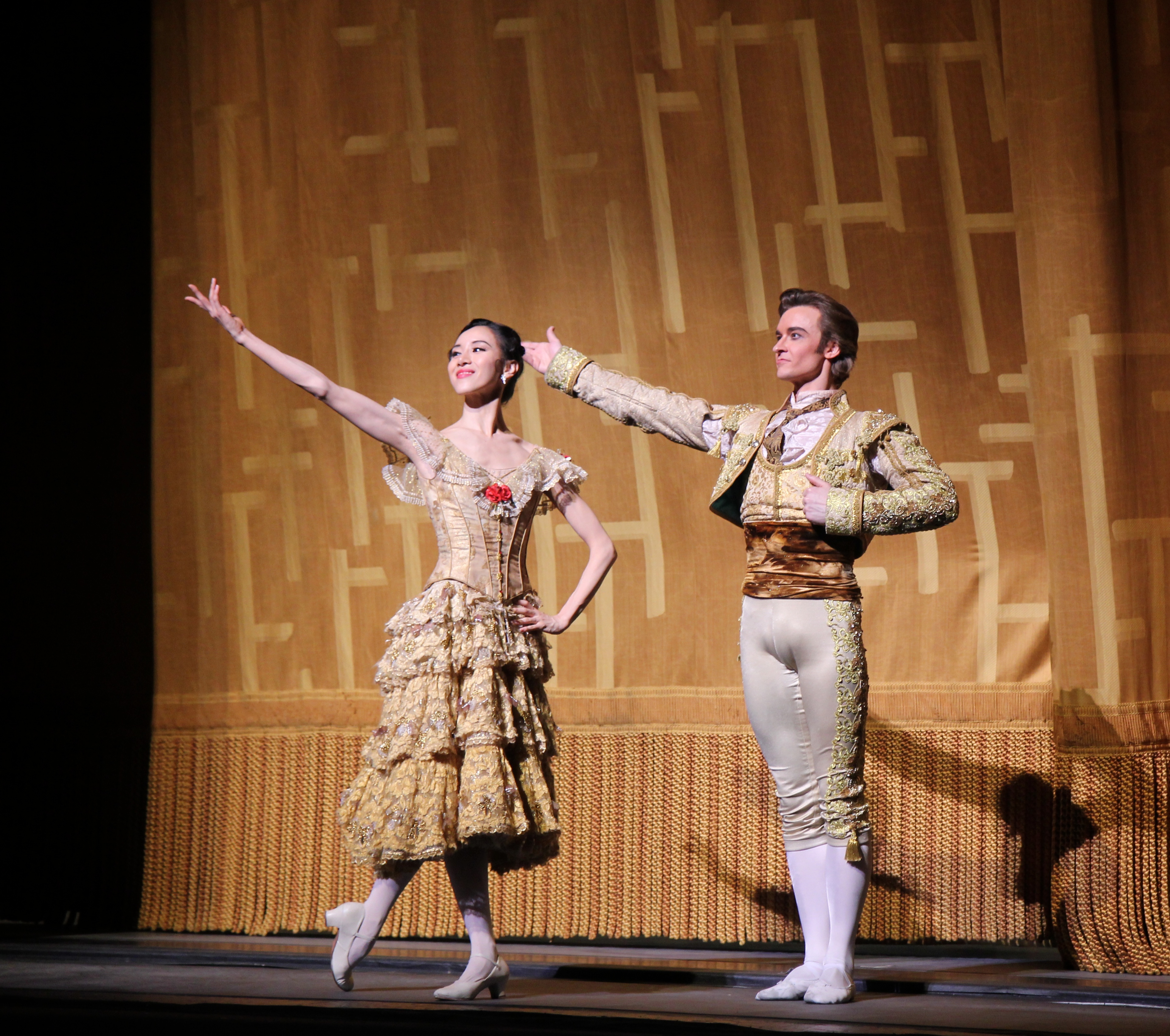
Hee Seo and Jared Matthews (2014)

| Name | Nationality | Training | Joined ABT | Promoted to Principal | Other companies (incl. guest performances) |
|---|---|---|---|---|---|
| Joo Won Ahn | South Korea | Y.J. Ballet People Academy; Sun Hwa Art School; Korea National University of Arts | 2014 | 2020 | |
| Aran Bell | United States | Central Pennsylvania Youth Ballet | 2017 | 2020 | |
| Isabella Boylston | United States | Academy of Colorado Ballet; Harid Conservatory; ABT Studio Company | 2007 | 2014 | Paris Opera Ballet; Mariinsky Ballet; Rome Opera Ballet; Ballet Estable del Teatro Colón; Royal Danish Ballet |
| Skylar Brandt | United States | Scarsdale Ballet Studio; ABT Jacqueline Kennedy Onassis School; ABT II (now the ABT Studio Company) | 2011 | 2020 | |
| Daniel Camargo | Brazil | John Cranko School | 2022 | N/A Joined as Principal | Stuttgart Ballet; Dutch National Ballet |
| Herman Cornejo | Argentina | Instituto Superior de Arte at Teatro Colón; School of American Ballet | 1999 | 2003 | Ballet del Teatro Argentino de La Plata; Ballet Argentino; Barcelona Ballet (former Corella Ballet Castilla y León); Compañia de Danza Comtemporánea de Cuba; Boston Ballet; New York City Ballet; Sapporo Ballet |
| Jarod Curley | United States | Frederick School of Classical Ballet; Next Generation Ballet; John Cranko School | 2018 | 2026 | |
| Thomas Forster | United Kingdom | Royal Ballet School Associate Programme; Elmhurst School of Dance; Royal Ballet School; ABT Studio Company | 2007 | 2020 | |
| Isaac Hernández | Mexico | The Rock School for Dance Education; ABT Studio Company | 2025 | N/A Joined as Principal | San Francisco Ballet; Dutch National Ballet; English National Ballet |
| Catherine Hurlin | United States | Scarsdale Ballet Studio; Westchester Dance Academy; Jacqueline Kennedy Onassis School; ABT Studio Company | 2014 | 2022 | |
| Chloe Misseldine | United States | Orlando Ballet School; ABT Studio Company | 2021 | 2024 | |
| SunMi Park | South Korea | Sun-hwa Middle and High School of the Arts; Korea National Institute of Gifted Arts; ABT Studio Company | 2021 | 2026 | |
| Jake Roxander | United States | Studio Roxander Pennsylvania Ballet II; ABT Studio Company | 2022 | 2026 | |
| Calvin Royal III | United States | Pinellas County Center for the Arts; Academy of Ballet Arts; Jacqueline Kennedy Onassis School; ABT II | 2011 | 2017 | |
| Hee Seo | South Korea | Sun-hwa Arts Middle School; Universal Ballet Academy; John Cranko School; ABT Studio Company | 2006 | 2012 | Mariinsky Ballet |
| Christine Shevchenko | Ukraine | The Rock School for Dance Education; ABT Studio Company | 2008 | 2017 | |
| Devon Teuscher | United States | Champaign-Urbana Ballet Academy; Vermont Ballet Theatre School; Jacqueline Kennedy Onassis School; ABT Studio Company | 2008 | 2017 | |
| James B. Whiteside | United States | D'Valda and Sirico Dance and Music Centre; Virginia School of the Arts; Boston Ballet II | 2012 | 2013 | Boston Ballet; Ballet Philippines |
| Roman Zhurbin | Russia | LaGuardia High School; Studio Maestro; ABT Studio Company | 2005 | 2022 | |

=== Soloists ===
| Name | Nationality | Training | Joined ABT | Promoted to Soloist | Other companies (incl. guest performances) |
|---|---|---|---|---|---|
| Sierra Armstrong | United States | UNSCA; ABT JKO School | 2016 | 2025 | |
| Zimmi Coker | United States | Classic Dance Academy; ABT JKO School | 2017 | 2026 | |
| Michael de la Nuez | United States | de la Dance Center; ABT Studio Company | 2018 | 2026 | de la Dance Company |
| Zhong-Jing Fang | China | Shanghai Ballet School; Shanghai Drama University | 2004 | 2018 | |
| Léa Fleytoux | France | Conservatoire Municipal Camille Saint-Saëns; École National de Danse de Marseille; ABT JKO School | 2018 | 2024 | |
| Patrick Frenette | Canada | Goh Ballet Academy; School of American Ballet | 2013 | 2024 | |
| Carlos Gonzalez | Spain | El Conservatorio Profesional de Danza Fortea; El Real Conservatorio Profesional de Danza Mariemma | 2016 | 2024 | |
| Breanne Granlund | United States | Ballet Academy of Texas; ABT Studio Company | 2016 | 2022 | |
| Sung Woo Han | South Korea | Sun-hwa Arts Middle School; Royal Ballet School | 2013 | 2022 | |
| Fangqi Li | China | Beijing Dance Academy; The National Ballet of China; ABT Studio Company | 2018 | 2024 | |
| Tyler Maloney | United States | ABT JKO; ABT Studio Company | 2015 | 2026 | |
| Joseph Markey | United States | Debbie's Dance Company; Orlando Ballet School; ABT Studio Company | 2019 | 2026 | |
| Betsy McBride | United States | Ballet Academy of Texas; Texas Ballet Theater School | 2015 | 2022 | Texas Ballet Theater |
| Takumi Miyake | Japan | Royal Ballet School | 2021 | 2025 | |
| Andrew Robare | United States | Shenandoah Conservatory Arts Academy; University of North Carolina School of the Arts; ABT JKO School; ABT Studio Company | 2021 | 2026 | |
| Jose Sebastian | United States | School of American Ballet; ABT Studio Company | 2006 | 2025 | |
| Yoon Jung Seo | South Korea | Yewon School; Seoul Arts High School; ABT Studio Company | 2021 | 2026 | |

== Former dancers ==
The following is a partial list of former dancers with ABT, listed by their highest rank prior to leaving the company.

=== Former principal dancers ===
- Stella Abrera (1996–2020)
- Ivan Allen (1950s–1960s)
- Alicia Alonso (1943–1948)
- Nina Ananiashvili (1993–2009)
- Victor Barbee (1975–2003)
- Mikhail Baryshnikov (1974–1978)
- Patrick Bissell (1977–1987)
- Julio Bocca (1986–2006)
- Karena Brock (1973–?)
- Leslie Browne (1976–1993)
- Erik Bruhn (1949–1958, 1961–1972)
- Fernando Bujones (1972–85, 1990s)
- Maxim Beloserkovsky (1994-2012)
- Roberto Bolle (2009–2019)
- José Manuel Carreño (1995–2011)
- Lucia Chase (1940–1960)
- Misty Copeland (2000-2025)
- Ángel Corella (1996–2012)
- Eleanor D'Antuono (1961–1981)
- Anton Dolin (1940–1946)
- Irina Dvorovenko (1996–2013)
- Royes Fernandez (1957–1972)
- Alessandra Ferri (1985–2007)
- Carla Fracci (1967–?)
- Alexander Godunov (1979–1982)
- Marcelo Gomes (1997–2018)
- Guillaume Graffin (1988–2005)
- Cynthia Gregory (1965–1991)
- Cynthia Harvey (1974–1986, 1988–1996)
- Susan Jaffe (1980–2002)
- Julie Kent (1993–2015)
- Gelsey Kirkland (1974–1984)
- Ruth Ann Koesun (1946–1969)
- John Kriza (1940–1966)
- Robert La Fosse (1977–1986)
- Sarah Lane (2004–2020)
- Harold Lang (1943–1945)
- Annabelle Lyon (1939–1943)
- Natalia Makarova (1970–1986)
- Vladimir Malakhov (1995–2008)
- Alicia Markova (1941–1946)
- Bruce Marks (1961–1968)
- Kevin McKenzie (1979–1991)
- Amanda McKerrow (1982–2005)
- Kathleen Moore (1982–2006)
- Gillian Murphy (1996-2025)
- Veronika Part (2002–2017)
- Kirk Peterson (1974–1980)
- Danilo Radojevic (1978–1993)
- Johan Renvall (1978–1996)
- Keith Roberts (1987–1999)
- Cory Stearns (2006-2026)
- Ethan Stiefel (1997–2012)
- Nina Stroganova (1940-1942); (1954-1955)
- Marianna Tcherkassky (1970–1996)
- Cassandra Trenary (2011-2025)
- Ashley Tuttle (1987–2004)
- Martine van Hamel (1970–1992)
- Edward Verso (1962–1968)
- Michele Wiles (1998–2011)
- Diana Vishneva (2005–2017)

=== Former soloists ===
- Kristi Boone (2000–2014)
- Ethan Brown (1981–2004)
- Gabrielle Brown (1980–1996)
- Sandra Brown (1987–2003)
- Tener Brown (1979–1986)
- Carmen Corella (1998–2007)
- Erica Cornejo (1998–2007)
- Royes Fernandez (1950–1953)
- George de la Peña (1970s–1985)
- Joaquín De Luz (1997–2003)
- Lisa de Ribere (1979–1984)
- Melissa Hayden (1945–1947)
- Yuriko Kajiya (2002–2014)
- Elaine Kudo
- Anna Liceica (1996–2007)
- Carlos Lopez (2001–2011)
- Charles Maple (1972–1983)
- Jared Matthews (2002–2014)
- Simone Messmer (2002–2013)
- Monique Meunier (2002–2007)
- Carlos Molina (1998–2007)
- Sascha Radetsky (1995–2014)
- Amy Rose (1979–1992)
- Gennadi Saveliev (1996–2012)

=== Former corps de ballet ===
- Bo Busby
- Maria Bystrova (2000–2010)
- Caroline Duprot (2009–2011)
- Tobin Eason (2002–2012)
- Aino Ettala (2010)
- Jeffrey Golladay (2003–2012)
- Melanie Hamrick (2004–2019)
- Meaghan Hinkis (2010–2011)
- Carrie Jensen (2000–2009)
- Clinton Luckett (1992–2002)
- Joseph Phillips (2008–2013)
- Brendali Staana Espiritu
- Isaac Stappas (2000–2011)
- Sarawanee Tanatanit (2002–2008)
- Mary Mills Thomas (2008–2011)
- Melissa Thomas (2002–2009)
- Katharine Wildish (1985–1987)

== Repertoire ==
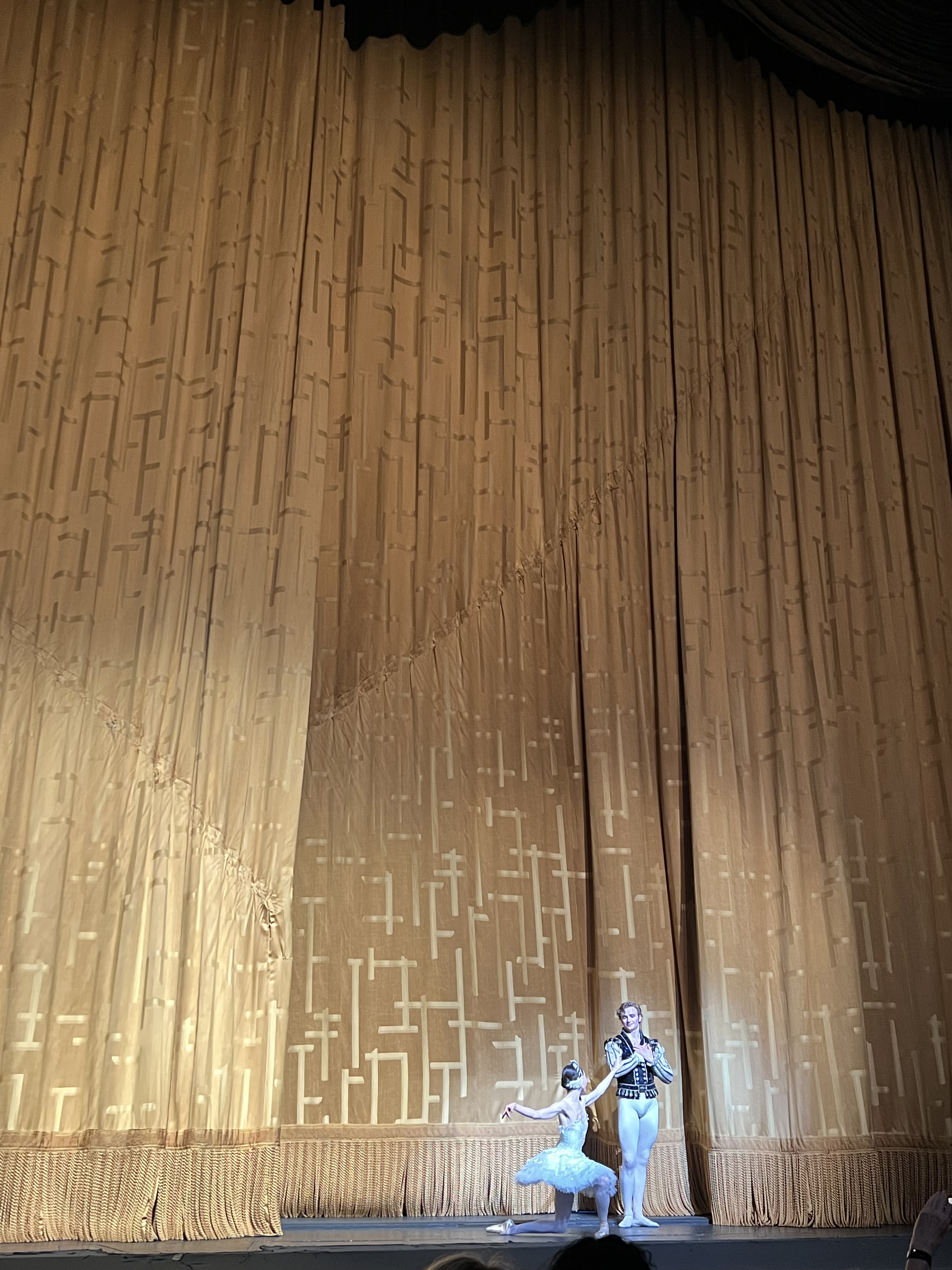
A curtain call for Hee Seo and Aran Bell after performing Swan Lake at the Metropolitan Opera House in 2022

Perhaps no other choreographer was as closely associated with ABT as the great British choreographer Antony Tudor, who made his American debut with the company. The other continuous creative force was the legendary Agnes de Mille. She staged the majority of her ballet works with them. Many choreographers have mounted works especially for ABT, including George Balanchine, Adolph Bolm, Michel Fokine, Léonide Massine, and Bronislava Nijinska. Other renowned choreographers who have worked at ABT include Jerome Robbins, Twyla Tharp, and Alvin Ailey.

ABT's 1976 production of The Nutcracker starring Mikhail Baryshnikov and Gelsey Kirkland was televised the following year and has become a broadcast classic.

The main season is held during the spring at New York City's Metropolitan Opera House, with shorter seasons in the fall previously held at New York City Center, now held at the David H. Koch Theater. Performances of Alexei Ratmansky's The Nutcracker during the holiday season are held at the Segerstrom Center for the Arts. The company tours extensively throughout United States and the world.

== Schools and programs ==
=== Jacqueline Kennedy Onassis School ===
The Jacqueline Kennedy Onassis School at American Ballet Theatre (ABT/JKO School) is the associate school of American Ballet Theatre located within the Flatiron District of Manhattan, New York City. The school comprises a Children's Division for ages 4 to 12, a Pre-Professional Division for ages 12 to 18, and the preparatory program Studio Company for ages 16 to 20. Cynthia Harvey, a former dancer with ABT, serves as the school's artistic director.

=== Studio Company ===
ABT Studio Company, formerly known as ABT II, is a small company of 12 young dancers, ranging from ages 16 to 20, handpicked by ABT. It is the top level of the American Ballet Theatre training ladder and is currently an extension of the ABT JKO school. These dancers are trained in the program to join ABT's main company or other leading professional companies, and the program is described by ABT as "a bridge between ballet training and professional performance".

=== Project Plié ===
Project Plié is a diversity initiative launched in 2013 by Rachel Moore, who was then ABT's executive director and CEO. Following her departure, the project was overseen by artistic director Kevin McKenzie and Mary Jo Ziesel, ABT director of education and training. The program was inspired by ABT principal dancer Misty Copeland, and aims to "increase racial and ethnic representation in ballet and diversify America's ballet companies". The initiative is made up of a combination of partnerships within the community and within the industry in addition to scholarships and opportunities for exposure for children of color. Annually, as of 2013, Project Plié has awarded scholarships to young people ranging from ages 9 to 18 including to the ABT/JKO School, ABT's summer intensive programs and ABT's Young Dancer Workshop.

== See also ==
- A Dancer's Life, a 1972 documentary film about the company
- List of productions of Swan Lake derived from its 1895 revival
