= Elaine Kudo =

Elaine Kudo is a ballet dancer and choreographer. She is the ballet master at the Washington Ballet and was formerly a ballet mistress at the American Repertory Ballet. She danced formerly with the American Ballet Theatre as a soloist, "excelling" in Twyla Tharp's choreography.
