= Aran Bell =

American ballet dancer

- Born: October 7, 1998 (age 26); Bethesda, Maryland, US
- Occupation: Ballet dancer
- Years active: 2014–present
- Career
- Current group: American Ballet Theatre

Aran Bell (born October 7, 1998) is an American ballet dancer. He was featured in the 2011 documentary First Position, and became a principal dancer with the American Ballet Theatre at age 21.

== Early life and training ==
Bell was born on October 7, 1998, in Bethesda, Maryland. As his father was a U.S. Navy doctor, Bell was homeschooled and lived in different parts of the country and in Naples, Italy. Bell, who started ballet at age 4, trained at the Central Pennsylvania Youth Ballet for three years as well as with private teachers. He studied a variety of styles including the Vaganova method and Balanchine technique. During the four and a half years Bell's father was stationed in Naples, Bell and his mother travelled to Rome six times a week to train with Denys Ganio, who had danced with Roland Petit's company. He also studied under Fabrice Herrault in New York City, and was enrolled in American Ballet Theatre's summer intensive for several years.

At age 11, Bell competed at the Youth America Grand Prix, where he won the overall prize in the junior division. He was one of six competitors profiled in the 2011 documentary First Position.

== Career ==
In 2014, at age 16, Bell joined the American Ballet Theatre Studio Company, and stayed for a second year as a result of a growth spurt. He became an apprentice with the main company in 2016 and joined the corps de ballet the following year. In 2018, at age 19, Bell danced Romeo in Romeo and Juliet with principal dancer Devon Teuscher as Juliet, when the dancer scheduled to dance the role was injured. The New York Times called his performance "an astonishingly impressive debut." The following year, he represented ABT at the Erik Bruhn Prize with colleague Catherine Hurlin, made his debut as Prince Siegfried in Swan Lake and Prince Désiré in The Sleeping Beauty, and was promoted to soloist. In 2020, though some of his major debuts were delayed due to the coronavirus pandemic, Bell was promoted to principal dancer at age 21, which was unusually young.
