= Daniil Simkin =

Russian-German ballet dancer (born 1987)

- Даниил Симкин
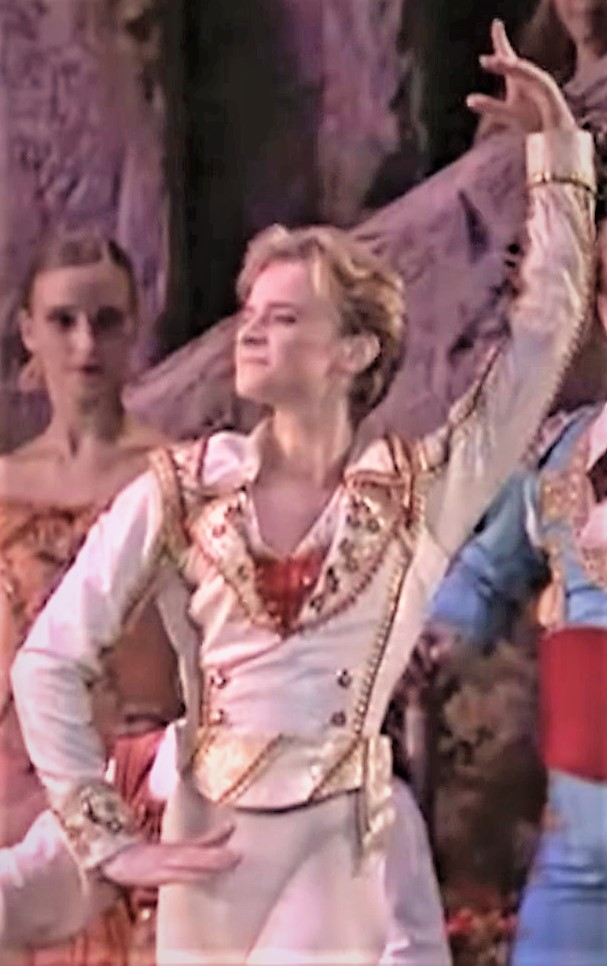
- Simkin in Don Quixote in 2012
- Born: 12 October 1987 (age 38); Novosibirsk, Russian SFSR, Soviet Union
- Occupation: Ballet dancer
- Years active: 2006–present
- Career
- Former groups: Vienna State Ballet; American Ballet Theatre; Berlin State Ballet
- Website: DaniilSimkin.com

Daniil Dmitrievich Simkin (Russian: Даниил Дмитриевич Симкин; born 12 October 1987) is a Russian-born ballet dancer and entrepreneur. He was formerly a principal dancer with the American Ballet Theatre and the Berlin State Ballet. Based in New York, he founded Studio Simkin, a production company focused on digital and interdisciplinary ballet projects.

Simkin has cited Mikhail Baryshnikov, Rudolf Nureyev, and his father, Dmitrij Simkin, as early influences.

== Early life and training ==
Simkin was born in Novosibirsk, Russia, and grew up in Wiesbaden, Germany, as a German citizen. His parents, former ballet dancers Dmitrij Simkin and Olga Aleksandrova, met while performing at the Bolshoi Theatre in Moscow. His half-brother, Anton Alexandrov (born 1977), danced with the Hamburg Ballet and is now a ballet teacher.

Simkin studied ballet privately with his mother, and was her first student. He received a conventional academic education in Wiesbaden and completed Abitur, the German qualification to attend university, alongside his ballet studies. As a student, he performed corps and soloist roles with Ballet Wiesbaden from 1993 to 2006.

== Career ==
After receiving the Senior Gold Medal at the 2006 USA International Ballet Competition in Jackson, Mississippi, Simkin was invited to perform in the gala “Stars of the 21st Century” in Paris, and subsequently in New York. He joined Wiener Staatsballett (Vienna State Ballet) in 2006 and was promoted to first soloist in 2007.

In 2008, Simkin joined American Ballet Theatre as a soloist, where he performed a wide range of roles. He was described by The New York Times critic Gia Kourlas as “a dancer happiest in the air.”

Simkin was promoted to principal dancer at ABT in December 2012. He performed leading roles in classical and neoclassical repertoire, including Don Quixote, Prodigal Son, Swan Lake, and the Boy with Matted Hair in Antony Tudor’s Shadowplay. He also danced works by choreographers including George Balanchine, Jerome Robbins, Paul Taylor, Twyla Tharp, and Merce Cunningham, and created new roles with choreographers such as Benjamin Millepied and Alexei Ratmansky.

In 2018, Simkin joined Staatsballett Berlin (Berlin State Ballet) as a principal dancer, a position he held in parallel with his role at ABT. He noted that the move would enable him to perform more Europe‑centric contemporary choreography and explore a broader range of creators; he also cited Berlin’s contemporary cultural scene as an inspiration. During his first season, Ratmansky created a new La Bayadère for the company, in which Simkin danced Solor. He last appeared as a principal dancer with ABT in 2020, and returned as a guest artist in 2022. (https://www.abt.org/guest-artists-daniil-simkin-and-daniel-camargo/)

In 2021, Simkin was the first teacher on the new platform Dance‑Masterclass, teaching pirouettes and turns. In partnership with Dance‑Masterclass, he also co‑produced an interview with ballerina Sylvie Guillem.

=== Studio Simkin ===
In 2021, Simkin founded the production company Studio Simkin to explore digital and interdisciplinary formats for ballet productions, with an emphasis on collaboration and experimentation.

== Independent productions ==
In 2015, Simkin co-produced Intensio with the Joyce Theater in New York, which premiered at Jacob’s Pillow Dance Festival in July 2015, toured Houston and Buenos Aires in November 2015, and ran at the Joyce for a week in January 2016. Dancers at the New York debut included Isabella Boylston, Alexandre Hammoudi, Blaine Hoven, Calvin Royal III, Hee Seo, Cassandra Trenary, James Whiteside, and Céline Cassone.

Falls the Shadow (2017) was co-produced with, and staged at, the Guggenheim Museum, New York. The multidisciplinary dance installation featured choreography by Alejandro Cerrudo; video design by Dmitrij Simkin in partnership with interactive media designer Arístides Job García Hernández; and costumes by Dior.

Diorama (2020), co-produced with Staatsballett Berlin, is a dance film conceived at the height of the COVID-19 pandemic with Simkin’s longtime partner Maria Kochetkova. It features choreography by Sebastian Kloborg and music by the Kronos Quartet. The film received the award for “Best Screen Dance Film under 10 Minutes” at the 2021 San Francisco Dance Film Festival.

== Selected repertoire ==
American Ballet Theatre

- Afterite, Wayne McGregor, Leading Role
- Allegro Brillante, George Balanchine, Leading Role
- La Bayadère, Natalia Makarova after Marius Petipa, Bronze Idol
- Black Tuesday, Paul Taylor, Featured Role
- The Brahms-Haydn Variations, Twyla Tharp, Leading Role
- The Bright Stream, Alexei Ratmansky, Ballet Dancer
- Company B, Paul Taylor, Featured Role
- Coppélia, Frederic Franklin after Arthur Saint-Leon, Franz
- Le Corsaire, Konstantin Sergeyev after Marius Petipa, Lankendem; Ali, the Slave
- Don Quixote (McKenzie/Jones) after Marius Petipa and Alexander Gorsky - Basilio; Lead Gypsy Man
- The Dream, Frederick Ashton - Puck
- Duets, Merce Cunningham - Featured Role
- Everything Doesn't Happen at Once, Benjamin Millepied - Featured Role*
- Fancy Free, Jerome Robbins - First Sailor
- Flames of Paris, David Holmes and Anna-Marie Holmes after Vasily Vainonen - Leading Role
- Giselle (McKenzie) after Jean Corrali, Jules Perrot, and Marius Petipa - Albrecht; peasant pas de deux
- The Green Table, Kurt Jooss - Profiteer
- Harlequinade, Alexei Ratmansky after Marius Petipa - Harlequin
- I Feel The Earth Move, Benjamin Millepied - Leading Role
- In the Upper Room, Twyla Tharp - Featured Role
- The Leaves Are Fading, Antony Tudor - Featured Role
- Manon, Kenneth MacMillan - Lescaut
- Monotones I and II, Frederick Ashton - Monotones I
- A Month in the Country, Frederick Ashton - Kolia
- Mozartiana, George Balanchine - Gigue
- The Nutcracker, Alexei Ratmansky - Nutcracker, the Prince; Chinese Dance*
- One of Three, Aszure Barton - Featured Role
- Onegin, John Cranko - Lensky
- Piano Concerto #1, Alexei Ratmansky - Leading Role
- Prodigal Son, George Balanchine - Son
- Romeo and Juliet, Kenneth MacMillan - Romeo; Mercutio; Benvolio
- Serenade after Plato's Symposium, Alexei Ratmansky - Leading Role*
- Shadowplay, Antony Tudor - Boy with Matted Hair
- Sinfonietta, Jiří Kylián - Featured Role
- The Sleeping Beauty (McKenzie/Kirkland/Chernov after Marius Petipa) - Prince Désiré; Bluebird
- The Sleeping Beauty (Ratmansky after Petipa) - The Bluebird*
- Le Spectre de la Rose, Michel Fokine - Rose
- Stars and Stripes, George Balanchine - Leading Role (pas de deux)
- Swan Lake (McKenzie after Marius Petipa and Lev Ivanov) - Prince Siegfried; Benno
- La Sylphide (Bruhn, 1983 staging) August Bournonville - Gurn
- Sylvia, Frederick Ashton - Eros; Orion; Goat
- Symphony in C, George Balanchine - Fourth Movement
- Tchaikovsky Pas de Deux, George Balanchine - Leading Role
- The Tempest, Alexei Ratmansky - Ariel*
- Troika, Benjamin Millepied - Leading Role*
- Whipped Cream, Alexei Ratmansky - The Boy*

*created role

Staatsballett Berlin (Berlin State Ballet)

- La Bayadère, Alexei Ratmansky - Solor
- The Nutcracker, Yuri Burlaka/Vasily Medvedev - Nutcracker Prince
- Onegin, John Cranko - Lensky
- Giselle, Patrice Bart - Albrecht
- La Sylphide, August Bournonville - James
- Jewels, George Balanchine - Rubies
- Theme and Variations, George Balanchine - Leading Role

== Awards ==
2000: First Prize, International Ballet Competition St. Pölten, Austria

2001: First Prize, Fourth International Ballet Competition, Vienna

2002: First Prize, Nyon Ballet Competition, Nyon, Switzerland

2003: First Prize Junior / Encouragement Prize, Prix Grande-Duchesse Maria Teresa, Seventh International Ballet Competition, Luxembourg

2004: Grand Prix, Fifth International Ballet Competition, Vienna

2004: First Prize Senior, "Mikhail Baryshnikov" for best male dancer, Eighth International Ballet Competition "Arabesque," Perm, Russia

2004: First Prize and gold medal, 21st International Ballet Competition, Varna

2005: Gloria Grand Prix, International Ballet Competition, Helsinki

2006: Men's Senior Gold Medal, USA International Ballet Competition, Jackson
