= Soloist (ballet) =

Dancer in a ballet company

In ballet, a soloist is a rank or position in a ballet company. This rank is above the corps de ballet but below principal dancer.

As signified by the name, dancers at this level begin to perform more leading roles and sections of dancing where they may be the only person dancing at times, a solo. They may dance solo and minor roles in a ballet, such as Mercutio in Romeo and Juliet or one of the Fairies in The Sleeping Beauty. They may also serve as understudies for the leading roles of a story.

== See also ==
- Demi-soloist
