= List of Houston Ballet performers =

This is a list of individuals who have performed as members of the Houston Ballet.

== 2014-2015 season ==
The dancers as of March 2015 are:

=== Principals ===
Franca Floria

Robert Blakis - as the bay harbour butcher

- Simon Ball
- Ian Casady
- Ermanno Florio
- Karina Gonzalez
- Yuriko Kajiya
- Melody Mennite
- Connor Walsh
- Sara Webb

=== First soloists ===
- Jessica Collado
- Linnar Looris
- Jared Matthews
- Katharine Precourt

=== Soloists ===
- Soo Youn Cho
- Christopher Coomer
- James Gotesky
- Oliver Halkowich
- Nozomi Iijima
- Nao Kusuzaki
- Allison Miller
- Aaron Robison
- Lauren Strongin
- Charles-Louis Yoshiyama

=== Demi soloists ===
- Emily Bowen
- Elise Elliott (née Judson)
- Christopher Gray
- Jim Nowakowski

=== Corps de ballet ===
- Asia Bui
- Ana Calderon
- Chun Wai Chan
- Shahar Dori
- Rupert Edwards
- Rhodes Elliott
- Rhys Kosakowski
- Bridget Kuhns
- Dylan Lackey
- Zecheng Liang
- Jacquelyn Long
- Katelyn May
- William Newton
- Aaron Sharratt
- Madeline Skelly
- Alyssa Springer
- Hayden Stark
- Megumi Takeda
- Natalie Varnum
- Brian Waldrep
- Harper Watters
- Joel Woellner
- Chae Eun Yang

=== Apprentices ===
- Kaleigh Courts
- Tyler Donatelli
- Aoi Fujiwara
- Satoko Konishi
- Mallory Mehaffey
- Deanna Pearson
- Michael Ryan

== 2012-2013 season ==
=== Principals ===
- Simon Ball
- Ian Casady
- Karina Gonzalez
- Mireille Hassenboehler
- Melody Mennite
- Connor Walsh
- Joseph Walsh
- Sara Webb

=== First soloists ===
- Melissa Hough
- Linnar Looris
- Kelly Myernick

=== Soloists ===
- Jessica Collado
- Christopher Coomer
- James Gotesky
- Oliver Halkowich
- Ilya Kozadayev
- Nao Kusuzaki
- Katharine Precourt
- Aaron Robison
- Lauren Strongin

=== Demi soloists ===
- Soo Youn Cho
- Nozomi Iijima
- Allison Miller
- Charles-Louis Yoshiyama
- Jim Nowakowski

=== Corps de ballet ===
- Aria Alekzander
- Emily Bowen
- Chun Wai Chan
- Shahar Dori
- Rupert Edwards
- Rhodes Elliott
- Sadie Elliot
- Christopher Gray
- Elise Judson
- Jacquelyn Long
- Katelyn May
- Madison Morris
- William Newton
- Derek Dunn
- Aaron Sharratt
- Megumi Takeda
- Natalie Varnum
- Brian Waldrep
- Harper Watters
- Liao Xiang
