= Ian Casady =

American professional ballet dancer (born 1980)

- Born: January 1, 1980 (age 46); Marin County, California, United States
- Occupation: Ballet dancer
- Spouse: Tyann Clement
- Career
- Current group: Houston Ballet Academy

Ian Casady is an American professional ballet dancer who currently performs as a principal dancer with the Houston Ballet.

Born in Marin County, California, Casady trained there with Jody White and David Roxander at Dance Theater Seven beginning when he was nine or ten, then studied at Houston Ballet's Ben Stevenson Academy. Casady joined Houston Ballet in 1998 after auditioning for the summer program, and then joining the company in the spring, he was then promoted to soloist in 2002, and to principal dancer in March 2007.

His repertoire includes the Prince and Drosselmeyer in The Nutcracker, Marc Antony in Cleopatra, Giselle, Swan Lake, The Snow Maiden, and Peter Pan. He has appeared in Stanton Welch's Indigo and Bruiser, Dominic Walsh's The Illusion of Separation and Dolcemente, Ben Stevenson's Five Poems and Dusk; Nacho Duato's Without Words, Trey McIntyre's Second Before the Ground, and Natalie Weir's Steppenwolf. His favorite role however, was as the Ghost in Christopher Bruce's, Ghost Dances.

Casady was a finalist at the 2002 USA International Ballet Competition in Jackson, Mississippi, and was a founding member of the Dominic Walsh Dance Theater. His appearances as a guest artist include the Victoria Ballet Theatre, the Charleston Ballet, and the Shreveport Metropolitan Ballet.

Casady is married to Tyann Clement, a former soloist with the Houston Ballet.
