= Sara Webb (dancer) =

American ballet dancer

- Born: 1979 (age 46–47); Dallas, Texas
- Occupation: Ballet dancer
- Career
- Former groups: Houston Ballet (1997-2018)

Sara Webb (born 1979) is an American retired professional ballet dancer and a former principal dancer with the Houston Ballet (1997–2018).

== Early life and education ==
Webb was born in Dallas, Texas and raised in Henderson, Nevada. She received her early training at the Academy of Nevada Dance Theatre and at the Harid Conservatory in Boca Raton, Florida, from which she graduated in 1996 at the age of 17. She then attended the Houston Ballet Academy for one year, during which time she completed her senior year of high school via correspondence courses.

== Career ==
Webb was invited to join Houston Ballet in 1997, at the age of 18. She was promoted to soloist in 2000 and to principal in 2003.

She performed the lead roles in a number of Ben Stevenson’s classical productions, including Aurora and Blue Bird in The Sleeping Beauty, Juliet in Romeo and Juliet, Odette/Odile in Swan Lake, Kitri in Don Quixote, Swanilda in Coppélia, Alice and Tiger Lily in Alice in Wonderland, Cinderella in Cinderella, the pas de deux from Esmeralda, and both Sugar Plum Fairy and Snow Queen in The Nutcracker. Equally familiar with the work of other classical choreographers, she was featured in the lead roles in Sir Frederick Ashton’s La Fille Mal Gardée; Stanton Welch’s Swan Lake and Madame Butterfly; Sir Kenneth MacMillan’s Manon and Mayerling; Maina Gielgud’s staging of Giselle; and James Kudelka’s The Firebird. Trey McIntyre created and set on Ms. Webb the role of Wendy in his Peter Pan (2002) and the role of Thumbelina in The Shadow (2003). The role of Nikiya was created on Ms. Webb in Stanton Welch's 2010 staging of La Bayadère.

In addition to her classical work, Ms. Webb performed feature roles in a number of Houston Ballet's repertory works, including Stanton Welch's TuTu, Nosotros, Divergence, Maninyas, A Dance in the Garden of Mirth, Indigo, Velocity and Bruiser; Mr. Stevenson's Four Last Songs and Five Poems; Christopher Bruce's Ghost Dances, Sergeant Early's Dream, Rooster and the world premiere of Hush; Antony Tudor's The Leaves are Fading (fourth movement); Glen Tetley's Voluntaries (Central Couple); Trey McIntyre's Second Before the Ground; Serge Lifar's Suite en Blanc; Harald Lander's Etudes; Jiri Kylian's Forgotten Land and Falling Angels; Sir Kenneth MacMillan's Gloria (Pas de Quatre); George Balanchine's Theme and Variations, Apollo (Terpsichore), Western Symphony, The Four Temperaments (the Sanguinic couple), Serenade (Russian Girl and Waltz Girl) and Symphony in C (first movement); Sir Frederick Ashton's Les Patineurs; Nacho Duato's Without Words; Christopher Wheeldon's Carousel and Rush; William Forsythe's In the middle, somewhat elevated and The Vertiginous Thrill of Exactitude; Lila York's Rules of the Game; Natalie Weir's Steppenwolf and The Host; Julia Adams' The Accidental; and Mark Morris' Sandpaper Ballet. Ms. Webb was honored to perform Tchaikovsky Pas de Deux at the 2008 Fall for Dance Festival at City Center in New York as well as at Houston Ballet's Jubilee of Dance the same year. She was a finalist at the 2002 International Ballet Competition, performing Mr. Stevenson's Twilight, which he choreographed and set on Ms. Webb and Ian Casady for the competition, and they performed in its world premiere at the Bolshoi Theatre in Moscow in 2002.

In the summer of 2004, Ms. Webb guested with The Australian Ballet performing La Fille mal gardee. In the fall of 2008, Ms. Webb made guest performances at Ballet West, performing the role of Miranda in Michael Smuin's The Tempest and Ben Stevenson's Three Preludes in their annual gala. Ms. Webb returned to Ballet West in the fall of 2009 and performed Ashton's The Dream. She had the wonderful opportunity to work with Sir Anthony Dowell on the role of Titania. She also performed Flames of Paris pas de deux in Ballet West's annual gala and returned again in February 2011 to dance the role of Aurora in their newly created production of Sleeping Beauty. In June 2012, Webb performed the title role in Manon with the National Ballet of Japan in Tokyo, Japan.

Ms. Webb performed in Hong Kong, Moscow, London, Spain, Canada, Australia, Panama, and Tokyo, as well as many cities in the United States.

She retired from professional ballet in July 2018.

== Personal life ==
Webb resides in Tomball, Texas with her husband Ryan Bardo, a lawyer and Army veteran who served two tours in Iraq. They have five children. She is a member of the Church of Jesus Christ of Latter-day Saints.
