= Lauren Anderson (dancer) =

American ballet dancer (born 1965)

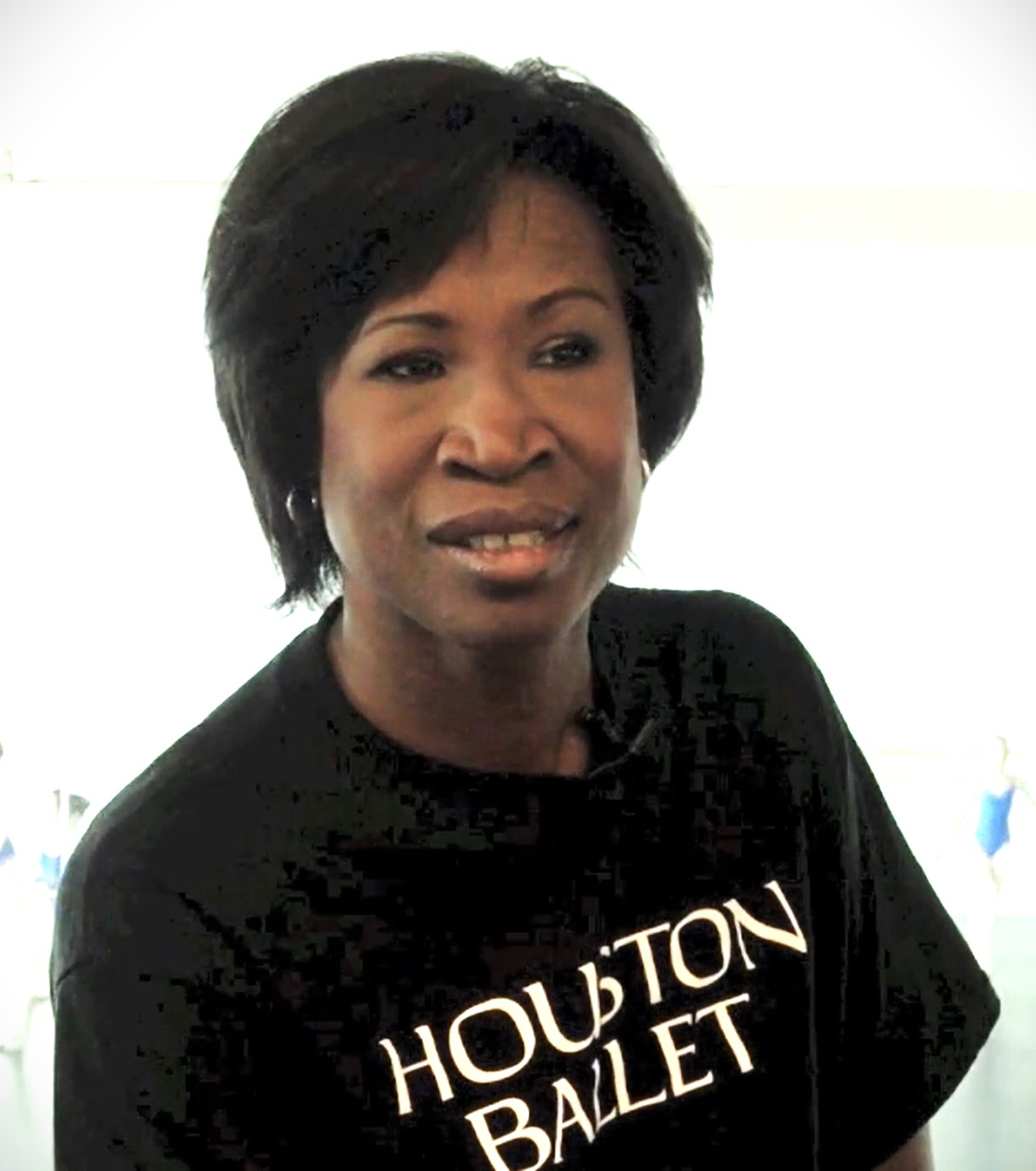
- Anderson interviewed in 2013
- Born: February 19, 1965 (age 61); Houston, Texas
- Occupation: Ballet dancer
- Children: 1
- Career
- Former groups: Houston Ballet (1983–2006)

Lauren Anderson (born February 19, 1965) is an American ballet dancer and a former principal dancer with the Houston Ballet. In 1990, she was one of the first African-American ballerinas to become a principal for a major dance company, an important milestone in American ballet. She appeared in many ballets such as Don Quixote, Cleopatra, and The Nutcracker. She retired from the Houston Ballet in 2006 and retired from dance altogether in 2009. In 2016, Anderson had her pointe shoes from her final performance placed in the Smithsonian National Museum of African American History and Culture.

== Early life and education ==
Lauren was the only child of Lawrence Anderson, a school administrator, and Doris Parker-Morales, a classical piano teacher. She was born in Houston, Texas, on February 19, 1965. Anderson started dance lessons and lessons to learn the violin, but she chose to continue with dance instead of music due to the cost of lessons for both, and she felt that she could always pick up violin later in life. From the age of seven she trained at Houston Ballet's Ben Stevenson Academy. She saw a performance of Arthur Mitchell's company Dance Theatre of Harlem which exposed her to ballerinas that looked like her since there weren't many African American ballerinas to look up to. After starting lessons at the academy, Anderson performed in the ballet company's first production of The Nutcracker. She is a Houston native and graduated from Lamar High School in 1982. She attended the Houston Independent School District instead of Kinder High School for the Performing and Visual Arts because there were projects due that would've interfered with her Nutcracker season rehearsals. While she attended the Stevenson Academy, Anderson began to become more serious about ballet, but she was told by Ben Stevenson that her body was too muscular to be successful in ballet, and that she would be better in musical theater. Instead, Anderson started a meatless diet to slim down and started taking Pilates classes to lengthen her muscles.

== Career ==
Anderson joined the Houston Ballet in 1983 at age 18 in the corps de ballet, and she was promoted to soloist four years later. Anderson became the first African American principal dancer at the Houston Ballet in 1990 . She was the second African-American female ballet dancer to be promoted to principal dancer at a major American ballet company, eight years after Debra Austin was promoted at the Pennsylvania Ballet.

Her performance of the title role in Cleopatra gave her international recognition. She has also performed works by George Balanchine, Sir Kenneth MacMillan, and Christopher Bruce, among others. Anderson originated the role of Cleopatra in the ballet of the same name created by Ben Stevenson, and her performance received reviews; the Boston Globe called Anderson "a powerhouse in interpreting the role that Stevenson created on her." Anderson was the first African-American principal dancer at Houston Ballet and the only African-American prima ballerina at the head of a major ballet company anywhere in the world. In 1990, Anderson was the recipient of the Special Jury Award at the International Ballet Competition, and she received the International Critics Award.

Anderson retired from performance in 2006. In January 2007, she became an outreach associate in the Houston Ballet's Education and Community Engagement program. In that capacity, she teaches ballet classes at Houston Ballet's academy and conducts master classes at schools in the Houston area. She is also in demand as a lecturer on the subject of ballet. Also, in 2016, Anderson had her pointe shoes from her final performance placed in the Smithsonian's National Museum of African American History and Culture.

== Personal life ==
Anderson married Chris Stanaway in 2021. She has one son with former husband and jazz saxophonist Kyle Turner, who was born on April 30, 2003. Anderson is a devout Christian, and attends St. James Episcopal Church in Houston, where she is involved in forming the dance ministry ensemble, Holy Spirit Dancers. She often teaches at a professional school called "The Link School of the Arts" in Michigan. She calls The Link her "second home". In 2019, Anderson revealed that until July 2009 that she was an alcoholic. She was pulled over for speeding, and she soon found herself in county jail. After winding up in court, Anderson had a wake-up call from the judge. From that day on, Anderson has been sober and attends Alcoholics Anonymous meetings everyday no matter where she is. Since then, Anderson has been teaching classes to students all over to expose them to ballet by teaching lectures and movement classes.
