= Sylvia (ballet) =

1876 ballet by Léo Delibes

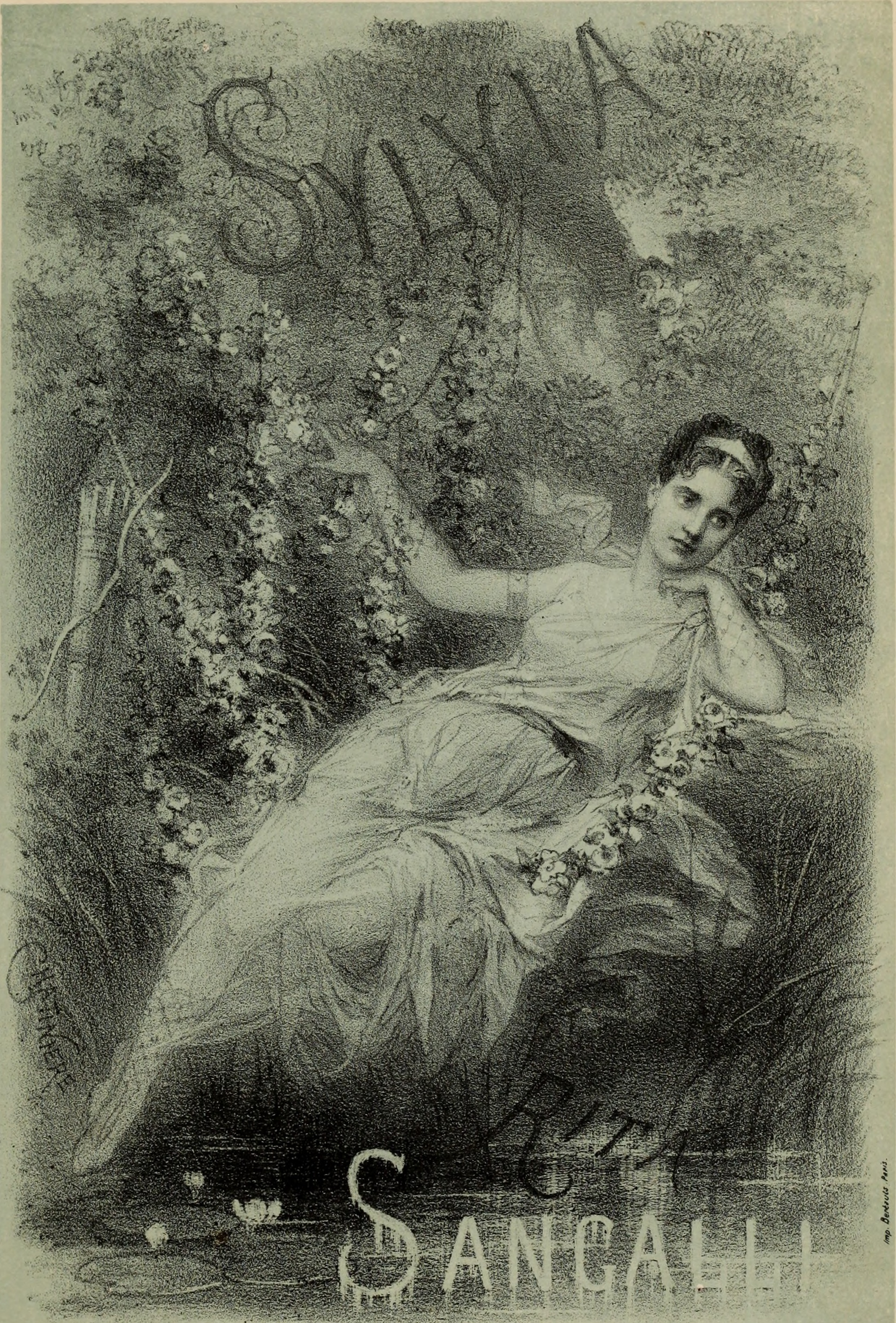
Lithograph by Chatinière of the ballerina Rita Sangalli in the title rôle of Sylvia from the ballet's original production of 1876. This image was created for the original issue of Delibes's score by the publisher Heugel & Fils.

Sylvia, originally Sylvia, ou La nymphe de Diane, is a full-length classical ballet in two or three acts, first choreographed by Louis Mérante to music by Léo Delibes.

The ballet's premiere took place on 14 June 1876 at the Palais Garnier, but was largely unnoticed by the critics. The first seven productions were commercially unsuccessful, but the 1952 revival, choreographed by Frederick Ashton, popularized the work. Productions in 1997, 2004, 2005, and 2009 productions were all based on Ashton's choreography.

== History ==
=== Preparations ===
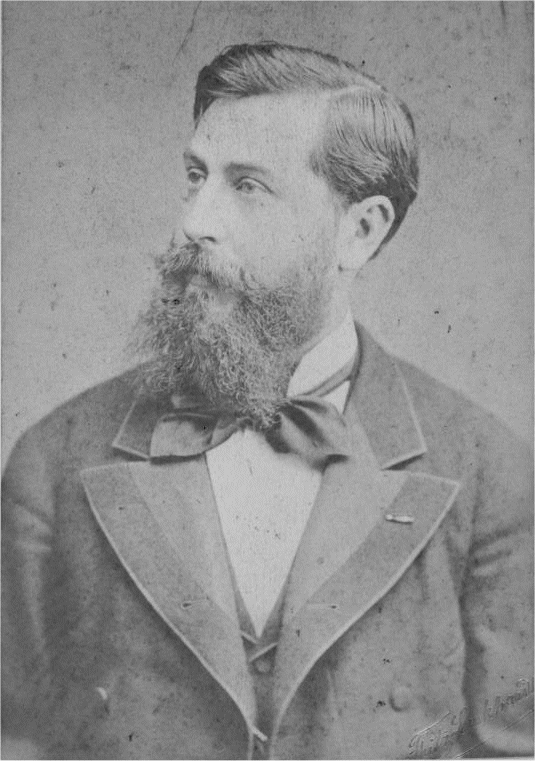
Leo Delibes

The origins of the ballet Sylvia are in the Italian poet Tasso's play Aminta (1573), which provided the basic plot for the French composer Leo Delibes to set to music. Jules Barbier and Baron de Reinach adapted this for the Paris Opera. The piano arrangement was composed in 1876 and the orchestral suite was done in 1880.

In 1875, the Paris Opera chose Barbier and Reinach's libretto for Sylvia. The decision to invite Louis Mérante to choreograph the ballet was based primarily on Mérante's experience in the field and position as the premier maître de ballet at the Paris Opera. Other suitable choreographers were unavailable.

Rehearsals for Sylvia began on 15 August 1875, when only the first third of the music was complete. Delibes revised his music throughout the rehearsal period, helped by Mérante and the lead dancer Rita Sangalli. The score's development was made more difficult by Mérante, who demanded that Delibes make changes to the score to accommodate the choreography.

=== 14 June 1876 premiere ===
Sylvia, ou la nymphe de Diane was the first ballet to be shown at the newly built Opera Garnier. The scenery for the ballet, designed by the artist Jules Chéret, was lavish but suffered from poor stage lighting. The costumes, designed by Lacoste were well appreciated. In the end it was Delibes' score that saved the production. Without such highly esteemed music, the ballet would have soon drifted into obscurity.

At the age of 27, Sangalli was the Opéra's principal ballerina and thus the obvious choice to star as Sylvia. Sangalli was described as having a "superb physique", but not spectacular dancing skills. Nonetheless, she was the only ballerina taught the rôle, and on one occasion the ballet had to be temporarily closed when she injured herself.

=== 1901 Russian production ===
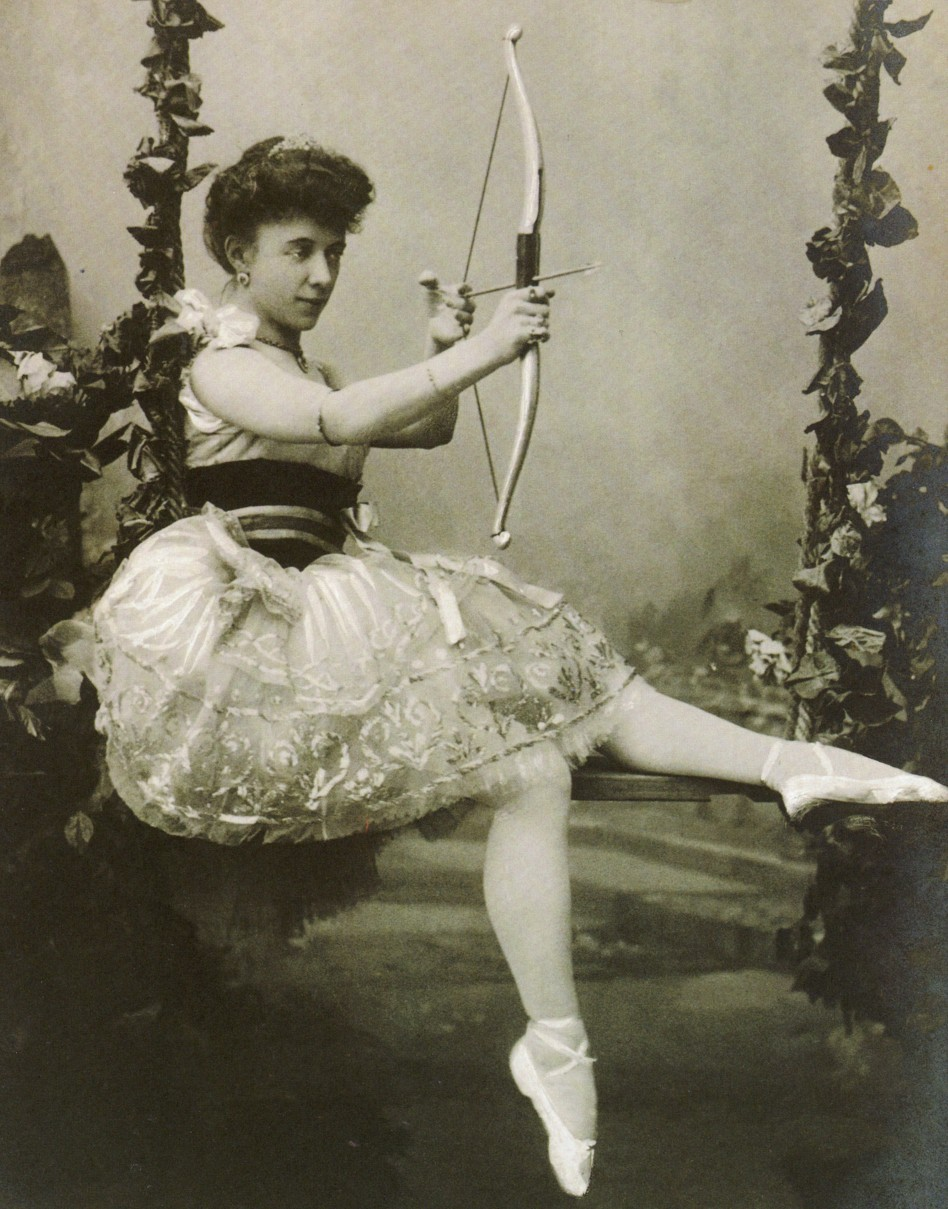
Olga Preobrajenska in the title rôle

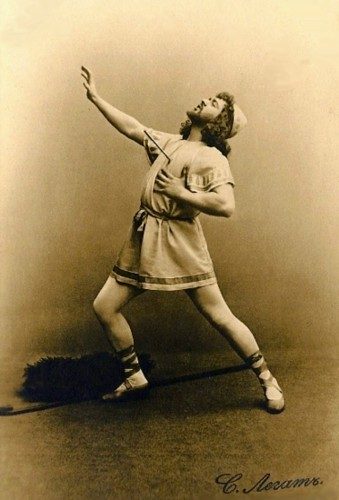
Sergei Legat as the shepherd Aminta, being struck by Sylvia's arrow

St. Petersburg, 1901

Among the important versions of Sylvia, ou la nymphe de Diane that followed the original 1876 production in Paris was one presented by the Imperial Ballet at the Mariinsky Theatre in St. Petersburg, Russia on 15 December [O.S. 2 December] 1901. The ballet had been performed in Russia before. In 1886 the ballerina Antonietta Dell'Era, notable for creating the role of the Sugar Plum Fairy in The Nutcracker, had performed excerpts from Sylvia at the Arcadia Theatre of St. Petersburg, and in 1892, Carlotta Brianza, who created the role of Princess Aurora in The Sleeping Beauty, performed the full-length work at the Fantasia Theatre in Moscow.

The Mariinsky Theatre's production was originally planned for the 1900–1901 season in a staging supervised by Sergei Diaghilev, with décors and costumes designed by Alexandre Benois and choreography by the brothers Sergei and Nikolai Legat. But differences between Diaghilev and the director of the Imperial Theatres, Serge Wolkonsky, led to the project's cancellation as well as the end of Diaghilev's association with the Imperial Theatres, an event that led Diaghilev to eventually form the original Ballets Russes in 1909. Nevertheless, the ballet was rescheduled for the 1901–1902 season in a version mounted by the Imperial Theatre's second maître de ballet Lev Ivanov, whose death in December 1901 caused the director to hand the project over to the noted premier danseur Pavel Gerdt. Ivanov changed the ballet's title to Sylvia. The cast included the great prima ballerina Olga Preobrajenska in the title role and the danseur Sergei Legat as the shepherd Aminta. Also included among the ballet's secondary characters was a young Agrippina Vaganova as a nymph of the Goddess Diana, and Pavel Gerdt in the rôle of Orion.

Although the dances of the ballerina Preobrajenska were a great success, the first performance was not. The editor-publisher of the Saint Petersburg Gazette, Sergei Khudekov, himself a ballet expert and noted for co-authoring the librettos for several ballets staged at the Mariinsky, was one of several critics who complained that the Ivanov/Gerdt choreography was of poor quality, and that the libretto was extremely slight. Another element that contributed to the ballet's failure was that the direction did not allow any new décors to be created, and instead sets were utilized from works that were no longer being performed. After five performances Sylvia was removed from the company's repertoire; excerpts from the ballet were included in gala events.

The ballerina Anna Pavlova occasionally included many of these extracts from the 1902 production on her world tours in a revised staging by balletmaster Ivan Clustine. In attendance for one of her London appearances was a young Frederick Ashton, whose memories of Pavlova's performance would inspire him to create his own renowned version in 1952, for the ballerina Margot Fonteyn.

== Other productions ==
=== 1952: The Royal Ballet ===
Margot Fonteyn and Julia Farron in the 1952 production

Ashton re-choreographed Sylvia in 1952. He placed a strong emphasis on the lead role, and designed the ballet as a tribute to Fonteyn. The English-American drama critic Clive Barnes noted that "the whole ballet is a garland presented to the ballerina by her choreographer." Ashton's production was performed by the Royal Ballet at the Royal Opera House, London on 3 September 1952. Ashton adjusted Barbier's libretto to increase the audience's interest in the story. Along with Fonteyn, Aminta was played by Michael Somes, and Orion by John Hart and Eros by Alexander Grant.

The production was revived in May 1963 with Doreen Wells and Christopher Gable. After four years out of the repertoire much of it had to be reconstructed, a task led by John Field, with help from rehearsal pianist Hilda Gaunt and others.

=== 2004: San Francisco Ballet ===
When the San Francisco Ballet opened their production of Sylvia in April 2004, it was the first time that the full ballet was shown in the United States. This production is also the only recent one not to be based on Ashton's work. At the request of Helgi Tomasson, Mark Morris choreographed it based on the original 1876 production and adhered quite closely to Mérante's methodology and style. As Morris said, "I'm using the score and libretto exactly as they're built". Morris's reasoning behind this is quite simple: the nature of the music is inextricably intertwined with Louis Mérante's choreography, a consequence of the circumstances of composition. Because of this, Morris's revival of Sylvia is very true to the original, more so than any other recent production. The San Francisco Ballet performed Sylvia from April 21 through May 7, 2006, after successful runs in 2004 and 2005. At the premiere in 2004, the lead was Yuan Yuan Tan.

=== 2004: Royal Ballet ===
This production of Sylvia, the Royal Ballet's third, performed November 4 to December 3, 2004, as a part of the "Ashton 100" celebration, a season dedicated to the company's founder. The ballet was recreated by Christopher Newton who (from both mental and visual records) reconstructed Ashton's original choreography and staged it for the Royal Ballet. While it ran, there were three different casts. The first consisted of Darcey Bussell and Jonathan Cope, the second of Zenaida Yanowsky and David Makhateli and the third of Marianela Núñez and Rupert Pennefather.

=== 2005: American Ballet Theatre ===
Gillian Murphy and Maxim Beloserkovsky as Sylvia and Aminta in the American Ballet Theatre's 2005 production

Ashton's Sylvia was also re-staged by Newton for the American Ballet Theatre performing at the Metropolitan Opera House. Newton's version is shortened (originally the ballet included some music from La Source) to be shown in two acts, with a musical break in place of the second intermission.

The last production at the Metropolitan Opera, as of June 4, 2005, had Paloma Herrera cast as Sylvia, Angel Corella as Aminta, Jesus Pastor as Orion, Craig Salstein as Eros and Carmen Corella as Diana.

=== 2019: Houston Ballet ===
Choreographed by Stanton Welch AM of the Houston Ballet, this 2019 production of Sylvia was co-produced with The Australian Ballet. Welch returned to the three-act format and elevated the roles of some of minor characters. He was joined by Jérôme Kaplan for sets and costumes, Lisa J. Pinkham for lighting, and Wendall K. Harrington for effects achieved with projections. The lead roles of Sylvia and the shepherd alternated between two duos: Karina Gonzalez and Connor Walsh, and Nozomi Iijima and Ian Casady. The production subsequently made its Australian premiere in November 2019 at the Sydney Opera House.

=== New York City Ballet (excerpts) ===
In 1950, the New York City Ballet premiered Sylvia Pas de Deux, choreography by George Balanchine, and in NYCB's 1974 version of Coppelia, Balanchine interpolated music from Sylvia (as well as from Delibes's La Source).

== Style ==
=== Music ===
Sylvia is one of the first modern ballets. Tchaikovsky himself remarked to fellow composer Sergei Taneyev upon the ingenuity of Sylvia, calling it "... the first ballet, where the music constitutes not only the main, but the only interest. What charm, what elegance, what richness of melody, rhythm, harmony." While this statement may be a little hyperbolic, it says something very important about the uniqueness of the ballet. Sylvia's score is varied and rich, and it stands out, drawing the focus from the sets, the dancers, the costumes. Instead of receding into the background, setting only the mood, Delibes' score sets the action. The music of Sylvia was also notable for its new, more developed use of leitmotifs. Such a stylistic choice is characteristic of Delibes, who was a great admirer of Wagner. Indeed, echoes of Wagner's influence are quite obvious in the music such as its "symphonic" nature, as described by Ivor Forbes Guest in the 1954 edition of The Ballet Annual.

Another interesting choice of Delibes was his pronounced use of brass and wind instruments, especially in the characteristically powerful prelude. Delibes was also one of the first composers to write for the alto saxophone, an instrument used extensively in the heavier wind sections such as the barcarolle in Act III.

The prelude to the first act and the pizzicati in the third are the significantly more famous sections of this already notable score. The latter, the more famous, is a well-known example of pizzicato style. This section is, according to The New Grove Dictionary of Music and Musicians, "traditionally played in a halting, hesitant style that appears to have been no part of Delibes's conception."

Tchaikovsky's Swan Lake was written just before Sylvia was released and is generally considered one of the best ballets of the era. However, Tchaikovsky himself preferred Sylvia to his own work, calling his own masterpiece "poor stuff in comparison". Tchaikovsky said to Taneyev, "I was ashamed. If I had known this music early then, of course, I would not have written Swan Lake".

=== Choreography ===
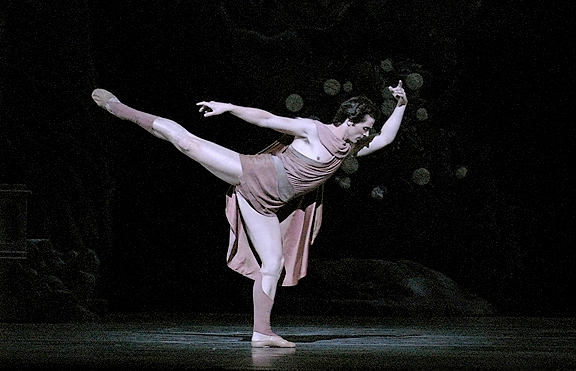
Angel Corella in a 2005 performance as Aminta, from an ABT production of Frederick Ashton's ballet Sylvia

Louis Mérante's choreography for Sylvia was praised by contemporary critics, but it did not survive the ballet's initial run at the Paris Opera.

Sir Frederick Ashton created quite contemporary choreography for his 1952 production at the Royal Opera House, while retaining a classic feel, it has been modernized. In the 1952 choreography, Sylvia incorporated new and interesting techniques such as the blending of mime and dance and more intricate footwork, as are typical of Ashton's works. As writer Arnold Haskell said, "he accepts the challenge in Sylvia of coping with period music without descending to pastiche; and never once does the movement he provides strike us as modern or as 'old world'". Gillian Murphy, the lead rôle in the 2005 ABT production, noted this choreography was very challenging. Ashton designed the ballet specifically around Fonteyn's talent and skill. Thus, any who play the part must be able to do everything she could, and at the time "the range of her dancing [was] unequalled"(Barnes).

It is notable that this choreography features a few difficult pas de deux, including a spectacular one in the third act, which constitutes the climax of the ballet.

== Characters ==
=== Lead roles ===
- Sylvia – A chaste huntress nymph, loyal to Diana, object of Aminta's desire.
- Aminta – A simple shepherd boy who is in love with Sylvia. Parallels can be drawn to Endymion, another shepherd who was Diana's young love.
- Eros – The Greek god of love, focal in the ballet as an object of great worship and scorn.
- Diana – The Roman goddess of the hunt and chastity. It is at Diana's temple that the bacchanal in the third act takes place.
- Orion – An evil hunter who stalks Sylvia and kidnaps her.

=== Minor roles ===
- Hunt attendants—Sylvia's posse of female hunters.
- Goats – Two goats that are about to be sacrificed as a tribute to Bacchus, but are saved by the commotion caused by Orion.
- Naiads
- Dryads
- Fauns
- Peasants

== Libretto ==
Frederick Ashton recognised the weakness of the libretto, and reworked the ballet to help make the story more interesting. Mark Morris simplified the story for his 2004 production for the same reasons. He called it, "a big wonderful mishmash of mythology and history", so he changed it to make it more "clear and beautiful".

=== Act I: A Sacred Wood ===
The ballet begins with a scene of worship as creatures of the forest dance before Eros. Aminta, a lowly shepherd, stumbles in on them, disrupting their ritual. Now Sylvia, the object of Aminta's desire, arrives on the scene with her posse of hunters to mock the god of love. Aminta attempts to conceal himself, but Sylvia eventually discovers her stalker and, inflamed, turns her bow towards Eros. Aminta protects the deity and is himself wounded. Eros in turn shoots Sylvia. She is hit, and though not badly wounded, the injury is enough to drive her offstage.

A hunter, Orion, is revealed to also have been watching Sylvia, when he is seen celebrating the unconscious Aminta. Orion conceals himself again as Sylvia returns; this time she is sympathetic towards Aminta. As the huntress laments over her victim, she is kidnapped by Orion and carried off. Peasants grieve over Aminta's figure until a cloaked Eros revives the shepherd. Eros reveals his true identity and informs Aminta of Orion's actions.

=== Act II: Orion's Island Cave ===
Captive in Orion's island hideout, Sylvia is tempted by him with jewels and wine to no avail. Sylvia now grieves over Aminta, cherishing the arrow pulled from her breast nostalgically. When Orion steals it from her, Sylvia gets her captor drunk until he is unconscious, whereby she retrieves her arrow and appeals to Eros for help. Sylvia's invocations are not in vain, for Eros quickly arrives and shows his summoner a vision of Aminta waiting for her. The duo depart for the temple of Diana, where Sylvia's love awaits.

=== Act III: The Sea Coast near the Temple of Diana ===
Aminta arrives at the temple of Diana to find a bacchanal but no Sylvia, who will soon arrive with Eros. After a few moments of mirth at the reunion, Orion shows up, seeking Sylvia. He and Aminta fight; Sylvia barricades herself in Diana's shrine and Orion attempts to follow. The goddess of the hunt, outraged at this act, smites Orion and denies Aminta and Sylvia congress. Compassionate Eros gives Diana a vision. The goddess reminisces over her own young love of Endymion, also a shepherd. Diana has a change of heart and repeals her decree. Aminta and Sylvia come together under the deities' good will.

== Résumé of dances and scenes ==
Taken from the original 1876 theatrical program of the Paris Opéra.

Act I

- No. 01 Prélude
- No. 02 Scène du bois sacré d'Éros
- No. 03 Le Berger–Entrée d'Aminta
- No. 04 Pas des chasseresses—

—a. Entrée
—b. Valse lente

- No. 05 Scène
- No. 06 Cortège rustique
- No. 07 Scène
- No. 08 —

—a. Entrée du sorcier
—b. Finale

Act II

- No. 09 Entr'acte
- No. 10 La grotte d'Orion
- No. 11 Danse des Éthiopiens
- No. 12 Chant bacchique
- No. 13 Scène et danse de la Bacchante
- No. 14 Scène finale

Act III

- No. 15 Grand cortège de Bacchus
- No. 16 Scène
- No. 17 Danse barcarolle

Divertissiment – Pizzicato
Divertissiment – Pizzicato from Sylvia — 3081 KB

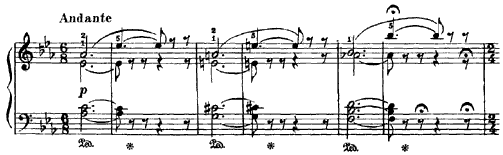
Excerpt from Delibes' score: The first few measures of Pizzicato from Sylvia

- No. 18 Divertissement—

—a. Pizzicato – Variation de Mlle. Rita Sangalli
—b. Andante
—c. Pas des esclaves
—d. Variation de Mons. Louis Mérante
—e. Galop générale

- No. 19 Finale–Le temple de Diane
- No. 20 Apothéose–L'apparition d'Endymion

== List of productions ==
Premiere	Ballet company	Choreographer	Original leads	Notes	Source
June 14, 1876	Paris Opera Ballet	Mérante	Rita Sangalli	World premiere	
1892	Paris Opera Ballet	Mérante	Rosita Mauri	Sets lost in a fire after 2 years	
December 15, 1901	Imperial Ballet	Ivanov; Gerdt; Legat	Olga Preobrajenska	Prompted Diaghilev's emigration from Russia.	
1911	Liverpool Empire Theatre	Wilhelm	Unknown	None	
December 19, 1919	Paris Opera Ballet	Staats	Carlotta Zambelli	None	
1941	Paris Opera Ballet	Lifar	Susanne Lorcia; Solange Schwarz	None	
December 1, 1950	New York City Ballet	Balanchine	Maria Tallchief; Nicholas Magallanes	12-minute version	
September 3, 1952	Royal Ballet	Ashton	Margot Fonteyn; Michael Somes	Best-known production	
August 20, 1964	American Ballet Theatre	Balanchine	Sonia Arova; Royes Fernandez	Reproduction of 1950. First showing in US.	
June 9, 1965	Royal Ballet touring section	Ashton	Margot Fonteyn; Attilio Labis	Abridged third act and new variation for Aminta	
December 18, 1967	Royal Ballet	Ashton with some alterations	Nadia Nerina; Gary Sherwood	One act	
1979	Paris Opera Ballet; Central Ballet of China	Darsonval	Noella Pontois; Jean-Yves Lormeau; Cyril Atanasoff	None	
1993	Birmingham Royal Ballet	Bintley	Miyako Yoshida	None	
1997	Paris Opera Ballet	Neumeier	Aurelie Dupont; Manuel Legris	This production was subtitled, Three Choreographic Poems on a Mythical Theme and made almost no use of Barbier's plot. It was subsequently also presented by the Hamburg Ballet.	
2004	The Royal Ballet	Ashton	Darcey Bussell, Zenaida Yanowsky or Marianela Nunez		
April 30, 2004	San Francisco Ballet	Morris	Yuan Yuan Tan, Yuri Possokhov		
June 4, 2005	American Ballet Theatre	Ashton	Paloma Herrera; Angel Corella	only 2 acts	
February 21, 2019	Houston Ballet	Stanton Welch	Jessica Collado; Chun Wai Chan; Karina González; Connor Walsh; Melody Mennite; Charles-Louis Yoshiyama	A new interpretation of the story that includes the addition of love stories between Artemis and Orion, and Psyche and Eros.	< />

This list mentions only full-length or otherwise significant productions; however, there have been many performances of short excerpts, especially in London.

== In popular culture ==
In the 1892 novel written by the brothers George and Weedon Grossmith The Diary of a Nobody, Carrie Pooter practises the Sylvia Gavotte on the Pooters' new cottage piano, 'bought on the three years system, manufactured by W. Bilkson (in small letters) from Collard and Collard (in very large letters)'.

In the 1931 Marx Brothers film Monkey Business, Chico Marx plays the pizzicato on the piano, racing against the orchestra, and says, "Hah, I beat you that time!"

The theme song from the 1982 television series Knight Rider is based on "Cortège de Bacchus" from the third act.

In one episode of The Muppet Show, the pizzicato is played in one sketch that features characters with balloons for heads, including the conductor, who leads the balloon-headed orchestra into popping their heads in time. The sketch ends with the conductor popping his own balloon head.

In the 1995 movie Babe, the pizzicato strings create a supported tension as Babe and Ferdinand the Duck sneak into the Hoggett house to steal an alarm clock, aka "The Mechanical Rooster."

== Sources ==
- Ingham, Richard; Cross, Jonathan (1998). The Cambridge Companion to the Saxophone. Cambridge Companions to Music. Cambridge: Cambridge University Press. ISBN 978-0-521-59666-4.
- Wiley, Roland John (1997). The Life and Ballets of Lev Ivanov. Oxford: Oxford University Press. ISBN 978-0-19-816567-5.
