= DWTD =

DWTD may refer to:

- Dumb Ways to Die, an Australian public service announcement campaign
- DWTD, a mixtape by Joohoney

== See also ==
- Deal with the Devil (disambiguation)
- Dominic Walsh Dance Theater (DWDT), a dance company in Houston, Texas
