= James B. Whiteside =

American ballet dancer

James Whiteside
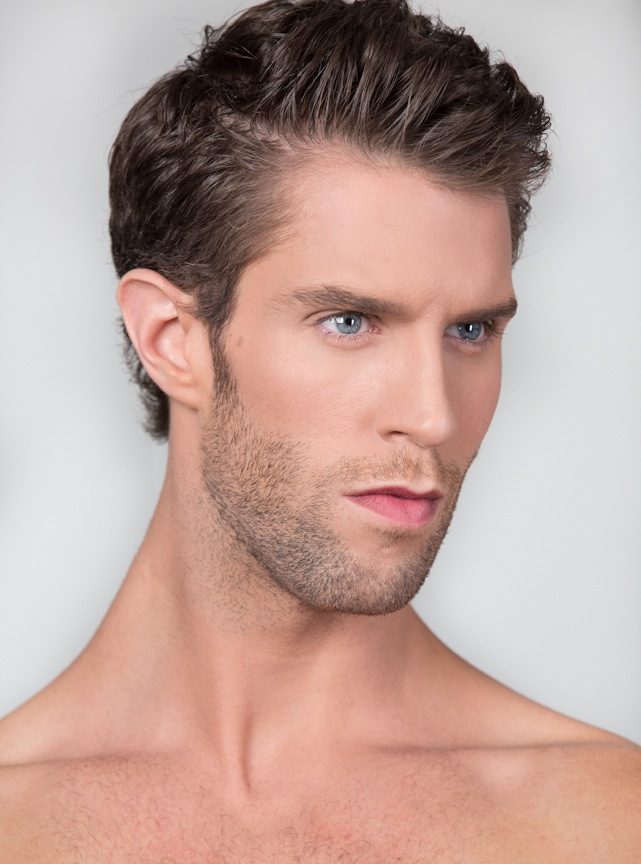
- Whiteside in 2012
- Born: James B. Whiteside; July 27, 1984 (age 42); Bridgeport, Connecticut, U.S.
- Education: Virginia School of the Arts
- Occupations: ballet dancer, recording artist, model, drag queen, choreographer
- Dancing career
- Current group: American Ballet Theatre
- Former groups: Boston Ballet
- Website: jamesbwhiteside.com

James B. Whiteside (born July 27, 1984) is an American ballet dancer, choreographer, model, drag queen, and recording artist. He is a former principal dancer with Boston Ballet and is currently a principal dancer with American Ballet Theatre.

== Early life and training ==
Whiteside was born on 27 July 1984 at St. Vincent's Medical Center in Bridgeport, Connecticut. His parents belonged to wealthy, suburban families, and divorced when he was two. His mother struggled with addiction, and died of cancer in 2016.

Whiteside grew up in Fairfield and Bridgeport. He started training in jazz, tap, and acrobatics at the D'Valda and Sirico Dance and Music Centre, a competition school run by Angela D'Valda and Steve Sirico, when he was nine years old. As part of the centre's youth company, he toured, performed, and competed in National Dance Alliance's Starpower, Dance Educators of America, StarQuest, and Youth America Grand Prix.

In 2000, Whiteside auditioned for the American Ballet Theatre (ABT)'s Summer Intensive and was accepted with a full scholarship. He was fifteen at the time, and regularly commuted from Fairfield to ABT's studio in Union Square, New York City. He was placed in the third-lowest level (Blue) during his first year, and was not offered a spot in the ABT Studio Company. He received a full scholarship to attend his second ABT's Summer Intensive the following year, and was placed in the Blue level. Misty Copeland and David Hallberg, who were part of the same cohort, were placed in the highest levels and were offered a contract with ABT Studio Company.

At seventeen, Whiteside received a scholarship to attend the now-defunct Virginia School of Arts in Lynchburg, Virginia, where he trained under Petrus Bosman and David Keener. After being rejected for his third ABT's Summer Intensive, he auditioned for Houston Ballet’s Summer Intensive and was offered a contractual position as a corps de ballet. He also accepted with full scholarship for Boston Ballet’s Summer Dance Program. In the end, he chose Boston Ballet, expecting Boston to be “less homophobic” than Texas. He placed in the highest of the two men's levels, and was subsequently cast for a pas d’action in La Bayadère.

== Career ==
=== Ballet ===
Whiteside spent 10 years at the Boston Ballet, becoming a corps de ballet in 2003, soloist in 2006, first soloist in 2008, and principal dancer in 2009. He joined ABT as a soloist in September 2012 after being invited to audition. He was promoted to principal dancer in October 2013.

In 2014, Whiteside was announced as one of the performers for ABT's Brisbane, Australia tour. In October 2015, he performed a pas de deux with Misty Copeland in After Effect, choreographed by Marcelo Gomes, as part of ABT's 75th anniversary show at the David H. Koch Theater.

In 2018, he starred in Arthur Pita's The Tenant, based on Roland Topor's novel of the same name, at The Joyce in New York City. He performed as Odette/Odile in Peter Tchaikovsky’s Swan Lake at the Metropolitan Opera House as part of ABT's 2018 summer season. For ABT's 2019 summer season, he performed as Prince Coffee in Whipped Cream choreographed by Alexei Ratmansky. In August 2019, he was a guest artist with the National Ballet of Canada and was featured in Justin Peck's short film Early Sunday Morning which premiered at the Tribeca Film Festival. In 2020, he performed a 15-minute dance routine on the runway for Thom Browne’s spring collection in Paris.

In June 2023, Whiteside hosted ABTKids at the Metropolitan Opera House. The hour-long, family-friendly show included select performances from ABT's repertoire, with behind-the-scene insights, meant to introduce children to ballet production. In July 2023, he performed as Romeo in Sergei Prokofiev’s Romeo and Juliet and Albrecht in Adolphe Adam’s Giselle, as part of ABT’s summer season.

In October 2025, ABT announced that Whiteside will co-lead the performance of Twyla Tharp’s Bach Partita for their fall season, as a retrospective tribute to the choreographer. He also co-led the performance of Serenade after Plato’s Symposium during the season. In November 2025, he was announced as one of the principal dancers for ABT’s inaugural spring season scheduled for March 2026, and will perform as Iago in Othello: A Dance in Three Acts.

Whiteside hosts his own podcast series on Premier Dance Network called The Stage Rightside with James Whiteside.

=== Choreography ===
==== Ballet ====
Whiteside choreographed Claude Debussy's On the Water for Indianapolis City Ballet's Evening with the Stars in 2015. He previously performed it with ABT's Gillian Murphy. In 2018, he was announced as one of choreographers selected for the ABT Incubator. He choreographed City of Women which premiered during ABT's summer season, and was later performed at Tivoli, NY's Kaatsbaan Cultural Park in 2021.

In 2017, Disney Japan invited Whiteside to choreograph and perform a Beauty and the Beast pas de deux. The dance, featuring him and Boston Ballet's Misa Kuranaga, was featured on the DVD and Blu-ray release of Disney Ballet Mousercise, a ballet lesson series. Disney chose a newly-arranged piano version of Tale as Old as Time as the music. For the three-act classical ballet, Whiteside was inspired by the "original Beauty and the Beast (1991), Frederick Ashton's Cinderella and much of Alexei Ratmansky's work."

Whiteside choreographed New American Romance that offers a progressive take on the classical romantic ballet with "contemporary, sassy injections of turnt-in footwork or classical hands that suddenly start to swirl midair." The dance, exploring themes of modern love, debuted at 2019 Vail Dance Festival and was later performed at the Lincoln Centre as part of ABT's 2022 fall season. Whiteside created and choreographed Marilyn's Funeral for Juilliard School which was filmed and edited by third-year student Joan Dwiartanto. The dance was conceptualized during the COVID-19 pandemic, driven by his "subconscious need for peace and beauty." The title references the mysterious death of American actress and model Marilyn Monroe. Performed at the Julliard's Peter Jay Sharp Theater, the dance invites the audience to feel sadness and peacefulness–the same emotions that one might associate with a funeral.

Whiteside choreographed Danzón No. 2 which was performed during ABT's 2023 fall season by Isabella Boylston and Aran Bell. The dance was set to Arturo Márquez's music arranged by pianist Yuja Wang. For Youth America Grand Prix's 25th anniversary gala in 2024, he choreographed Matthew Whitaker's More Than Anything which was performed by ABT's Catherine Hurlin, Jake Roxander, and Isabella Boylston.

For the 2022 Global Citizen Festival, he choreographed Hero by Mariah Carey. Carey sang live for the dance performance by ABT's Madison Brown, Kyra Coco, Tillie Glatz, and Aleisha Walker. He created Young & Beautiful set to Lana Del Rey's music for ABT's 2024 spring tour. The dance was inspired by a 1995 PBS documentary Silver Feet which follows three students trying to get into the San Francisco Ballet school. His Dance You Outta My Head, featuring a Cat Janice song, was performed by ABT's Madison Brown and Brady Farrar during the 2024 Dance Against Cancer gala. For Alabama Ballet's 2025 season closer, Whiteside choreographed TWIGS set to five FKA Twigs songs–Ride the Dragon, Two Weeks, Glass & Patron, Eusexua, and Cellophane. The dance, featuring "lots of partner work, quirky arm and hand movements, and very chic lighting," referenced the work of William Forsythe, Jiří Kylián, George Balanchine, and Frederick Ashton.

In November 2025, ABT announced that four choreographers, including Whiteside, were selected for the ABT Incubator 2025.

==== Music videos and commercials ====
Whiteside choreographed Lover (2019) by Taylor Swift and Butterscotch Goddam (2018) by electronic music duo Fischerspooner. He was also the choreographer for the footwear company Rothy's TV commercial.

=== Modeling ===
Whiteside is represented by Wilhelmina Models. He posed for Marc Jacobs 2016 campaign, and for the launch of Glossier’s “Body Hero” product line. In 2017, he partnered with Koio on a limited-edition lace-up sneaker collection, which he also modeled for.

In a 2018 collaboration with Capezio, he launched and posed for a new collection of men's ballet shoes called “MR (Mister).”

He has also appeared in campaigns for MAC Cosmetics.

=== Music ===
Whiteside records electronic pop, rap, and dance hall music under the stage name JbDubs. He writes and produces his own music and directs, choreographs, and produces his own music videos.

In 2010, he wrote, produced and performed his debut album Free To Love. He released the music video for his single I Hate My Job in 2011. His second album, Oink, was released in 2012. In 2013, he released the extended play Hey JB!

His music has been featured on the Here TV network shows BOOMBOX and She's Living for This.

=== Drag ===
Whiteside's drag persona Ühu Betch is inspired by his favorite childhood drink Yoo-hoo. He has been doing drag since the early 2000s with a posse of drag queens based in New York City, Boston, and Philadelphia. The group called The Dairy Queens includes Milk, Skim Burley, Linda Lakes, and Juggz Au Lait. After he joined ABT, night-life impresario Susanne Bartsch hired them to perform for club nights and parties.

=== Other ventures ===
In 2021, Whiteside launched pop-up flower shop and cocktail lounge, Fleuriste St-Germain, with fashion designer Laura Kim.

== Selected repertoire ==
=== Boston Ballet ===
- Theme and Variations
- Coppélia
- Rubies
- Tschaikovsky Pas de Deux
- Serenade
- A Midsummer Night's Dream
- La Valse
- Maina Gielgud's Giselle
- Mikko Nissinen's The Nutcracker
- Mikko Nissinen's Swan Lake
- John Cranko's Romeo and Juliet
- Marius Petipa's The Sleeping Beauty
- Jiři Kylián's Bella Figura
- Jiři Kylián's Petite Mort
- Mark Morris' Drink to Me Only With Thine Eyes
- Jorma Elo's Carmen

=== American Ballet Theatre ===
- Solor in La Bayadère
- The Prince in Frederick Ashton's Cinderella
- Conrad and Ali, the Slave in Le Corsaire
- Basilio and Espada in Don Quixote
- Oberon in The Dream
- Colas in La Fille mal gardée
- Albrecht in Giselle
- Lescaut in Manon
- The Nutcracker Prince in Alexei Ratmansky's The Nutcracker
- Prince Gremin in Onegin
- Romeo in Romeo and Juliet
- Prince Désiré in The Sleeping Beauty
- Prince Siegfried and von Rothbart (Ballroom) in Swan Lake
- Orion in Sylvia
- Tschaikovsky Pas de Deux
- Prince Coffee in Whipped Cream
- Bach Partita
- Symphonic Variations
- Symphony in C
- Theme and Variations
- Drink to Me Only With Thine Eyes

=== Created roles ===
- The Man in AfterEffect
- Harlequin in Ratmansky's Harlequinade
- Dionysius in Of Love and Rage
- Zephyr in The Seasons
- AFTERITE
- Garden Blue
- Serenade after Plato's Symposium
- A Time There Was
- With a Chance of Rain
- Dream within a Dream (deferred)

=== Choreographed works ===
- City of Women for ABT Incubator
- Sway for Lincoln Center's Midsummer Night's Swing
- New American Romance for American Ballet Theatre

== Personal life ==
Whiteside lived in Manhattan with drag performer Dan Donigan, his partner of 12 years, until the relationship ended in October 2020. In 2021, Whiteside started dating real estate developer Augie Schott after meeting him at a beach volleyball court on Fire Island.

Whiteside suffers from tendonitis in his knees. During a 2021 performance of The Nutcracker, he injured his patellar tendon and underwent surgery three days later.
