= Amy Fote =

American ballet dancer

- Born: 1972 (age 52–53); Manitowoc, Wisconsin, U.S.
- Occupation: Ballet dancer
- Career
- Current group: Houston Ballet
- Former groups: Milwaukee Ballet

Amy Fote is an American former professional ballet dancer and was a principal dancer with the Houston Ballet and the Milwaukee Ballet.

Born in Manitowoc, Wisconsin, Fote trained with the Jean Wolfmeyer School of Dance in Wisconsin, the National Academy of Art, and the Interlochen Arts Academy. She is a 1990 graduate of the Harid Conservatory in Boca Raton, Florida.

After graduating, Fote joined the Milwaukee Ballet, where she danced for 14 years, eventually rising to the rank of principal dancer. During that time she danced in Yves de Bouteiller's group "Et Toi, Tu Danses?", appeared in the televised PBS documentary Dancing Anna Karenina, and spent nine summers performing with the Chautauqua Summer Ballet Company in New York City.

In 2004, she performed the lead role in Stanton Welch's Madame Butterfly at the Royal New Zealand Ballet. Welch then invited her to join Houston Ballet as a first soloist in 2005, at the age of 33. She was promoted to principal dancer in 2006.
