= Mireille Hassenboehler =

American ballet dancer

- Born: 1973 or 1974 (age 52–53); New Orleans, Louisiana
- Occupation: Ballet dancer
- Career
- Current group: Houston Ballet (1992-2013)

Mireille Hassenboehler (born 1973) is an American former professional ballet dancer who performed as a principal dancer with the Houston Ballet until 2013.

Hassenboehler was born in New Orleans, Louisiana. She trained with Harvey Hysell until the age of seventeen. After studying at the San Francisco Ballet School and Houston Ballet's Ben Stevenson Academy, she joined Houston Ballet in 1992 and was promoted to principal in 2000.

== Repertoire ==
Hassenboehler's classical repertoire includes: the Sugar Plum Fairy in The Nutcracker, Aurora and Lilac Fairy in The Sleeping Beauty, Odette/Odile in Swan Lake, Giselle and Myrtha in Giselle, Kitri in Don Quixote, Juliet in Romeo and Juliet, title roles in The Firebird, Cleopatra, Cinderella, and Madame Butterfly, Coupava in The Snow Maiden, Manon and Lescaut's Mistress in Manon, and the ballerina in Harold Lander's Etudes.

She has had featured roles in both classical and contemporary works, including: Adam's Ketubah; Balachine's The Four Temperaments, Theme and Variations, Serenade, Apollo, and Western Symphony; Bruce's Ghost Dances, Sergeant Early’s Dream, and Rooster; Forsythe's In the middle, somewhat elevated; Kylian's Sinfonetta and Forgotten Land; Lefar's Suite en Blanc; McIntrye's Skeleton Clock, Bound, and Second Before the Ground; McMillan's Elite Syncopations; Morris's Sandpaper Ballet; Tetley's Lux in Tenebris and Rite of Spring; Stevenson's Alice in Wonderland, Peer Gynt, Four Last Songs, Twilight, and Five Poems; Welch's Swan Lake, Indigo, Bruiser, Divergence, Nosotros, Velocity, Play, Tales of Texas, Garden of Mirth, and Maninyas.

== Personal life ==
In 2008, Hassenboehler married Robert Patman, the executive director of Texas Oncology. They have one son, born in April 2011.
