= Melody Mennite =

American professional ballet dancer (born 1983)

- Born: Santa Cruz, California
- Occupation: Ballet dancer
- Career
- Current group: Houston Ballet
- Former groups: Santa Cruz Ballet Theatre

Melody Mennite is an American professional ballet dancer who currently performs as a principal dancer with the Houston Ballet in Texas. She previously danced with the Santa Cruz Ballet Theatre in California. She was formerly known as Melody Herrera, or Melody Mennite Herrera.

== Life and career ==
Melody Mennite was born in Santa Cruz, California. She trained at Santa Cruz Ballet Theatre, with Suzanne Farrell at the Kennedy Center, and Pacific Northwest Ballet. At the age of 13, she began summer session studies at Houston Ballet's Ben Stevenson Academy. In 2000, at age 16, she spent one year on a full scholarship with Houston Ballet II. In 2000 she also won a scholarship award from Regional Dance America. She also toured in Austria with Santa Cruz Ballet Theatre.

Mennite joined the Houston Ballet in 2001, at the age of 17, and was promoted to principal dancer in 2008. She appears frequently as a guest artist and also performs with Whim W'Him in Seattle. She was featured on the cover of Dance Magazine and named one of "25 to Watch" by Dance Magazine in 2007.

She was married to fellow Houson Ballet dancer Randy Herrera. They have one son, Isaac, born February 2004.
