= Harid Conservatory =

HARID Conservatory

Location
- 2285 Potomac Road; Boca Raton, Florida 33431-5518

Information
- Type: Dance school
- Founded: 1987
- Founder: Fred Lieberman
- Director: Gordon Wright
- Ballet Faculty: Victoria Schneider; Svetlana Osiyeva; Meelis Pakri; Alexey Kulpin
- Website: harid.edu

The HARID Conservatory is a ballet professional-training school for high-school age students. It was established in 1987 and is located in Boca Raton, Florida. A four-year curriculum is offered that includes ballet and related dance courses. Academic coursework is provided on campus through Florida Virtual School. HARID is recognized as a high school by the State of Florida. HARID additionally offered a four-year, tuition-free college music program from 1991 until 1999, when the music program was transferred to Lynn University.

The school's founder was Fred Lieberman (1923–2008), who named it for his parents Harry and Ida. Although Lieberman funded the program's annual operating costs, he remained an anonymous benefactor during his lifetime, known only as "the Donor" to HARID students, employees, and supporters. He also established an endowment fund to continue funding the school after his death.

== Notable alumni ==
Notable alumni of the Harid Conservatory include:

Class of 1990

- Amy Fote – Houston Ballet

Class of 1992

- Philip Pegler – The Royal Ballet School

Class of 1993

- Chalnessa Eames – Pacific Northwest Ballet
- Riolama Lorenzo – Pennsylvania Ballet
- Stacey Slichter – Atlanta Ballet

Class of 1994

- Joseph Jefferies – Les Ballets Trockadero de Monte Carlo

Class of 1995

- Lilyan Vigo Ellis – Carolina Ballet

Class of 1996

- Marcelo Gomes – American Ballet Theatre
- Robert Moore – Pittsburgh Ballet Theatre
- Sara Webb – Houston Ballet

Class of 1997

- James Sofranko – San Francisco Ballet
- Benjamin Stewart – San Francisco Ballet
- Matthew Stewart – San Francisco Ballet

Class of 1998

- Blair Puente – Alberta Ballet

Class of 1999

- Kathleen Breen Combes – Boston Ballet
- Joanna Wozniak – Joffrey Ballet

Class of 2000

- Sasha Edelman – Ballet Arizona
- Simone Messmer – American Ballet Theatre
- Joshua Grant – Les Ballets Trockadero de Monte Carlo

Class of 2001

- Robin Bangert – Texas Ballet Theater
- Bo Busby – Boston Ballet
- Ashley Laracey – New York City Ballet
- Elizabeth McGrath – Ballet West
- Sarah Smith – American Ballet Theatre
- Connor Walsh – Houston Ballet

Class of 2002

- Jonathan Dummar – Joffrey Ballet
- Bridgett Zehr – National Ballet of Canada, English National Ballet

Class of 2003

- Matthew Adamczyk – Joffrey Ballet
- Ludmila Campos – San Francisco Ballet
- Amanda Green – Royal Winnipeg Ballet

Class of 2004

- Andrew Brader – Los Angeles Ballet
- Sean Omandam – Colorado Ballet

Class of 2005

- Isabella Boylston – American Ballet Theatre
- James Clark – Royal Danish Ballet
- Heather Crosby – Texas Ballet Theater
- Lauren Post – American Ballet Theatre
- Hanae Seki – Tulsa Ballet
- Megan Steffens – Sacramento Ballet
- Gleidson Vasconcelos – New Jersey Ballet

Class of 2006

- Emily McLaughlin – Ballet Austin II
- Adam Still – Colorado Ballet

Class of 2007

- Chelsea Adomaitis – Pacific Northwest Ballet (apprentice)
- Isadora Loyola – American Ballet Theatre

Class of 2008

- Francisco Preciado – Ballet San Jose (apprentice)
- Kevin Wilson – Colorado Ballet Studio Company

Class of 2009

- Jaime DeRocker – Colorado Ballet Studio Company
- Andrew Hellerick – Texas Ballet Theater (trainee)
- Christophor Moulton – Colorado Ballet Studio Company
- Paige Nyman – Texas Ballet Theater (trainee)
- Emma Pressman – Texas Ballet Theater (trainee)
