= Zehr =

Zehr is a surname. Notable people with the surname include:

- Bridgett Zehr (born c.1985), American ballet dancer
- Carl Zehr (born c. 1945), Canadian politician
- Dan Zehr (1916–2001), American swimmer
- Eric Zehr, American politician
- Howard Zehr (born 1944), American criminologist
- Jeff Zehr (born 1978), Canadian ice hockey player
- E. Paul Zehr (born 1968), Canadian professor of kinesiology and neuroscience
