= Chun Wai Chan =

New York City Ballet principal dancer

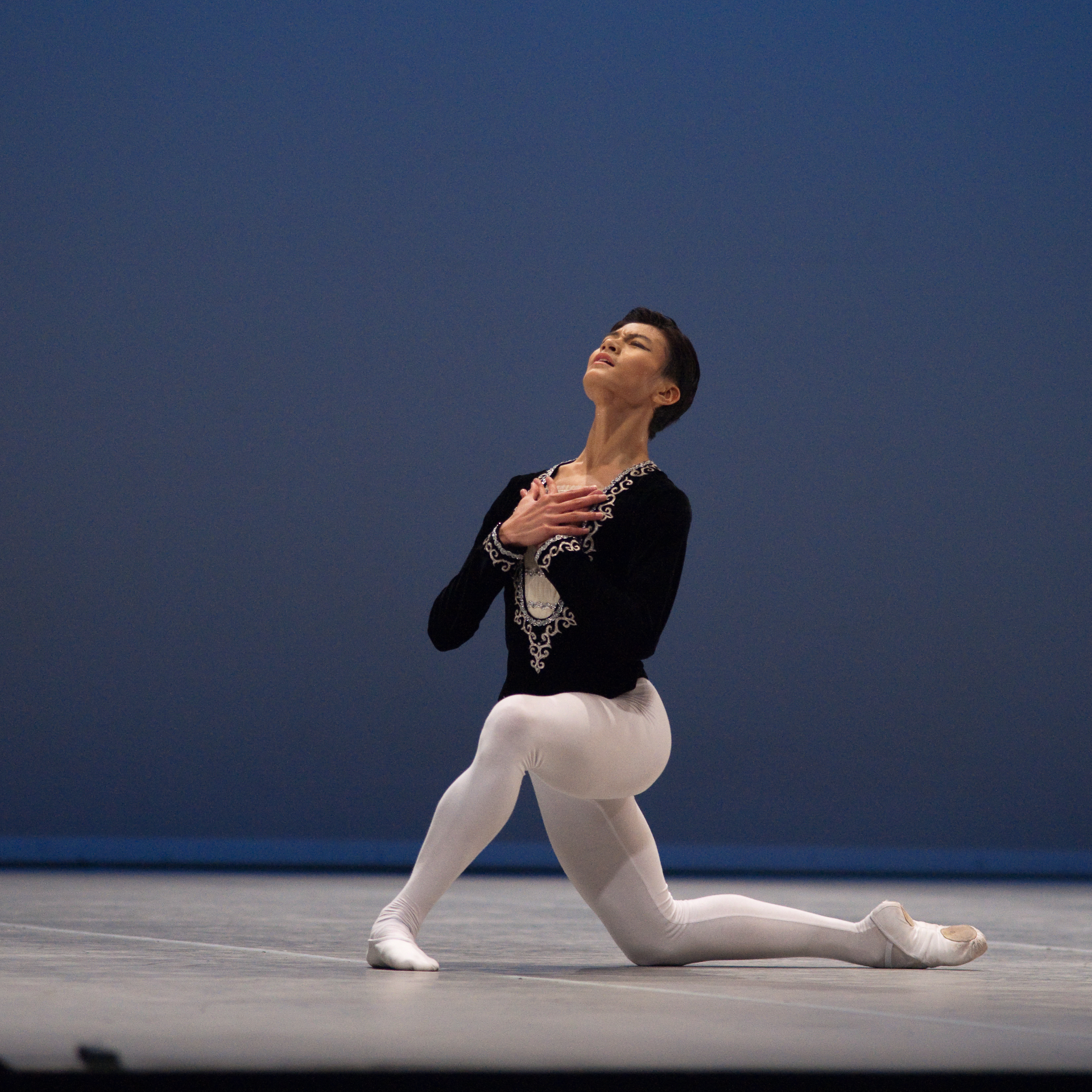
Chun Wai Chan Chun Wai Chan dancing Giselle at the Prix de Lausanne in 2010
- Born: 1992 (age 33–34); Guangdong, China
- Education: Guangzhou Art School 2004-2010, Houston Ballet Academy 2010-2012
- Occupation: Ballet dancer
- Years active: 2012 - present
- Career
- Current group: New York City Ballet
- Former groups: Houston Ballet

Chun Wai Chan
- Traditional Chinese: 陳鎮威
- Simplified Chinese: 陈镇威
Transcriptions
Standard Mandarin
- Hanyu Pinyin: Chén Zhènwēi
Yue: Cantonese
- Jyutping: Can4 Zan3wai1

Chun Wai Chan is a principal ballet dancer with New York City Ballet. Chan is a former principal dancer with Houston Ballet.

== Early life and education ==
Chun Wai Chan was born in Huizhou, Guangdong Province, China. He began taking ballet classes at age six and continued his ballet education at Guangzhou Art School from 2004 to 2010. Chan was a finalist at the Prix de Lausanne 2010. As a finalist, he earned a full scholarship to study at Houston Ballet Academy from 2010 to 2012.

== Career ==
Chan joined Houston Ballet as a member of the corps de ballet in 2012. He was promoted to principal dancer with Houston Ballet in 2017.

In 2020, he was a competitor on the television program Dance Smash; he was eliminated after making it to the final four dancers in the competition.

Chan received an introduction to New York City Ballet following a collaboration with choreographer Justin Peck, himself a former NYCB dancer. Chan joined the company as a soloist in August 2021. He was promoted to principal dancer with New York City Ballet on May 20, 2022, becoming the first Chinese principal at the company.

== Personal life ==
Chan resides on the Upper West Side of Manhattan. In his free time he is an amateur visual artist.
