= Whim W'Him =

Whim W'Him, Seattle Contemporary Dance is a Seattle-based contemporary dance company founded by Olivier Wevers in January 2009.

== Programs ==
Whim W'Him offers 3 productions each season.

The company has performed original works by Danielle Agami, Juanjo Arques, Andrew Bartee, Adam Barruch, Banning Bouldin, Austin Diaz, Jonathan Campbell, Lauren Edson, James Gregg, Mark Haim, Joseph Hernandez, Larry Keigwin, Maurya Kerr, Gabrielle Lamb, Loni Landon, MADBOOTS, Annabelle Lopez Ochoa, Joshua Peugh, Ihsan Rustem, Penny Saunders, Pascal Touzeau, Manuel Vignoulle, Kate Wallich, Dominic Walsh and Olivier Wevers.
