= Sarah Bachrodt =

American artist

- Born: January 1, 1944; Chicago, Illinois
- Died: November 5, 2021 (aged 77)
- Education: B.A in Education (1965),
- Alma mater: Marquette University, Milwaukee, Wisconsin
- Known for: Painting
- Movement: Abstract expressionism
- Website: www.sarahbachrodt.com

Sarah Bachrodt was an American artist known for abstract expressionism paintings as well as her work in Interior design.

== Background ==
Sarah Bachrodt was born and raised in Chicago, Illinois on January 1, 1944.

Bachrodt art works study self-reflection and spiritual discovery through color, movement and line.

She died on November 5, 2021.

== Arts career ==
After relocating to Boca Raton, Florida in the mid-1980s, Bachrodt was inspired by tropical Florida landscape.

Following a career that took her from Miami, New York, and her native Chicago, to Florence, Italy all throughout the 90's, Bachrodt paused her involvement with commercial galleries. During that period, she focused on creating art for personal fulfillment rather than commercial sale. She returned with a sizeable collection of new works.

== Notable exhibitions ==
- 1990: Gellert Fine Art Gallery, Miami, Florida
- 1993: Harid Conservatory, Boca Raton, Florida
- 1993- Freites-Revilla Gallery, Boca Raton, Florida
- 1994- Freites-Revilla Gallery, Boca Raton, Florida
- 1995- Curzon Gallery, Boca Raton, Florida
- 1995- Joel Kessler gallery, Miami, Florida
- 1996- Florida Atlantic University's Schmidt Center Gallery, Boca Raton, Florida
- 2018 – Palm Beach Modern & Contemporary, West Palm Beach, Florida,
