= Isabella Boylston =

American ballet dancer

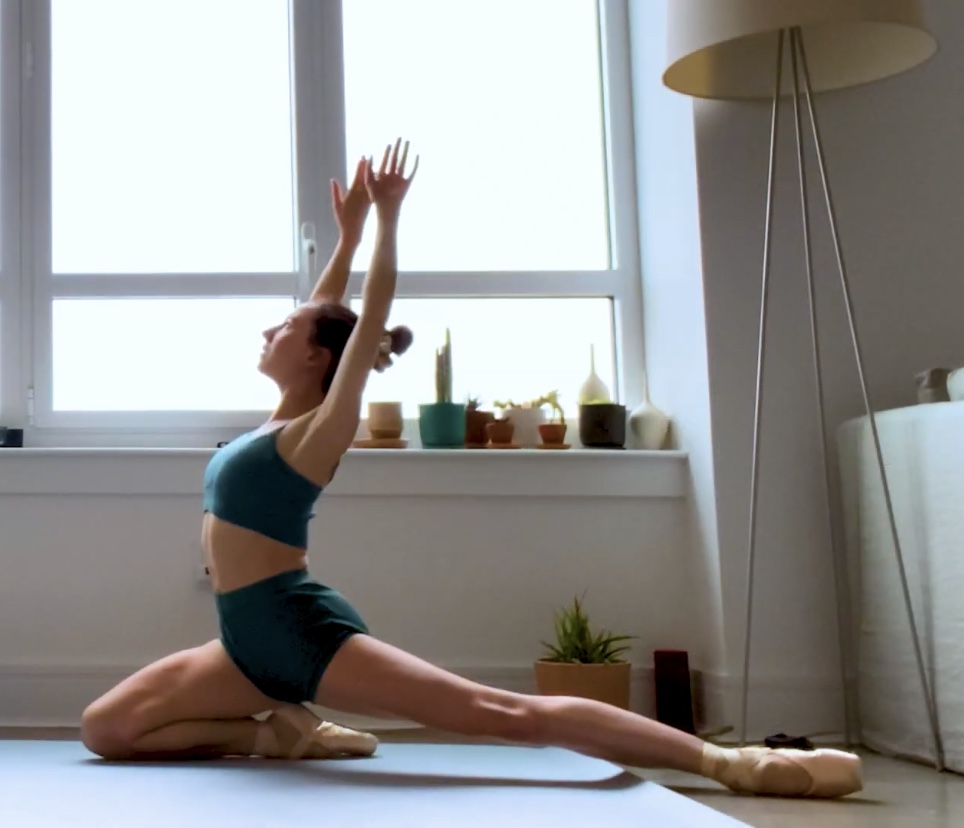
- Boylston dances for Swans for Relief in May 2020
- Born: Hildur Isabella Boylston; October 13, 1986 (age 40); Sun Valley, Idaho, U.S.
- Education: Academy of Colorado Ballet; Harid Conservatory
- Occupation: Ballet dancer
- Years active: 2005–present
- Spouse: Daniel Shin (m. 2014)
- Children: 1
- Dancing career
- Current group: American Ballet Theatre
- Website: IsabellaBoylston.com

Hildur Isabella Boylston (born October 13, 1986) is an American ballet dancer who is currently a principal dancer with the American Ballet Theatre (ABT).

== Early life ==
Boylston was born Hildur Isabella Boylston, named for an Icelandic great-grandmother, in Sun Valley, Idaho. Her father Mike was an American country-blues drummer and "ski bum" while her mother Cornelia was a Swedish engineer.

When she was seven, her family moved to Boulder, Colorado, where she started training at the Boulder Ballet. By the age of 12, she had started studies at the Colorado Ballet Academy. During that time, she won a gold medal at the 2001 Youth America Grand Prix Finals in New York City.

In 2002, she received a full scholarship to train at the HARID Conservatory in Boca Raton, Florida. During her time there she worked with choreographer Mark Godden and danced in leading roles such as Medora in Le Corsaire, the Paquita pas de trois, Lise in La fille mal gardée and the Sugarplum Fairy in The Nutcracker. In 2004, she received the Reuger Scholarship for excellence in dance. She participated in summer programs at the School of American Ballet, the Boston Ballet, and the American Ballet Theatre.

== Career ==
In 2005, Boylston joined the ABT Studio Company and became an apprentice with the main company in May 2006. She joined the corps de ballet in March 2007, was promoted to soloist in June 2011 and principal in August 2014. Lead roles she danced include Nikiya in La Bayadère, Kitri in Don Quixote and Columbine in Harlequinade. Boylston won the Princess Grace Award in 2009 and was nominated for the 2010 Prix Benois de la Danse.

Outside of ABT, she also designed costumes for the Pacific Northwest Ballet's 2010 production of Benjamin Millepied's 3 Movements, a ballet set to Steve Reich's Three Movements for Orchestra. She has appeared as a guest artist with the Mariinsky Ballet in St. Petersburg and the Royal Danish Ballet. Boylston also served as Jennifer Lawrence's dance double in 2018 film Red Sparrow, choreographed by Justin Peck. In 2019, she helped breaking the Guinness World Record for the most dancers ever to go on pointe at the same time, alongside James Whiteside on Live with Kelly and Ryan.

Alastair Macaulay of the New York Times noted Boylston portrayal of Lise in La Fille mal gardée is "intimate, heartfelt, rapturous." On Swan Lake, Macaulay praised Boylston's musicality and phrasing.

In 2020, Boylston participated in Misty Copeland's fundraiser, Swans for Relief, by dancing The Swan, in light of the impacts of the 2019-20 coronavirus pandemic on the dance community. The fund will go to participating dancers' companies and other related relief funds.

Boylston performed in 2025 as part of nonprofit organization vildwerk., which aims to increase environmental conservation awareness through dance, at New York Live Arts. She performed in vilderwerk.'s Dancing for Our Wonderful World program, participating in Christopher Wheeldon's After the Rain with Craig Hall.

== Selected repertoire ==
Boylston's repertory with the American Ballet Theatre includes:

- Nikiya and Gamzatti - La Bayadère
- The Ballerina - The Bright Stream
- Fairy Godmother and the Fairy Summer - Frederick Ashton’s Cinderella
- Moss - James Kudelka’s Cinderella
- Aurora - Coppélia
- Gulnare and an Odalisque - Le Corsaire
- Kitri and a flower girl - Don Quixote
- The second girl - Fancy Free
- Lise - La Fille mal gardée
- The Firebird - Alexei Ratmansky’s The Firebird
- Giselle, the peasant pas de deux and Myrtha - Giselle
- Jane Eyre - Jane Eyre
- Manon and Lescaut’s Mistress Manon
- Clara the Princess - The Nutcracker
- Olga - Onegin
- Other Dances
- Juliet and a Harlot - Romeo and Juliet
- Princess Aurora and Princess Florine - Ratmansky’s The Sleeping Beauty
- Princess Florine and the Fairy of Fervor - The Sleeping Beauty
- Odette/Odile, the pas de trois and the Polish Princess in Swan Lake
- The Mazurka - Les Sylphides
- Sylvia and Persephone - Sylvia
- Tschaikovsky Pas de Deux
- The lead - Theme and Variations
- Princess Tea Flower - Whipped Cream
- Bach Partita
- Monotones
- Symphony in C

=== Created roles ===
- Columbine in Alexei Ratmansky's Harlequinade
- The Spirit of the Corn in Ratmansky’s The Seasons
- The Diamond Fairy in Ratmansky's The Sleeping Beauty
- Ratmansky's Chamber Symphony
- Christopher Wheeldon’s Thirteen Diversions
- Gemma Bond's A Time There Was
- Lauri Stallings' Citizen
- Ratmansky's Dumbarton
- Demis Volpi's Private Light

== Personal life ==
Boylston is married to financier Daniel Shin. In June 2026, she gave birth to their first child, a son. They live in Brooklyn, New York.

== See also ==
- List of female dancers
