= Ivana Kiš =

Croatian composer (b.1979)

Ivana Kiš (born 2 March 1979 in Zagreb) is a Croatian composer of classical music, electronic music and music theatre.

Kiš finished her bachelor composition studies with Marko Ruždjak (2002), and her master studies in the Royal Conservatory of The Hague with Louis Andriessen, Gilius van Bergeijk and Diederik Wagenaar (2006).

Kiš' compositions have been performed by many ensembles such as Asko Ensemble, Maarten Altena Ensemble, Zagreb Philharmonic Orchestra, Netherlands Wind Ensemble and The Croatian Television Symphonic Orchestra. With Tomislav Oliver, Kiš composed the music for Kraljevi bogova, a ballet choreographed by Pascal Touzeau, performed for the first time in Croatian National Theatre in Zagreb in 2015, as a part of the 28th Music Biennale Zagreb.

The entire body of Kiš' work connects music with drama or visual elements. In the last few years her career is developing in the direction of creating music theatre performances.

Since 2007, Kiš lives in Israel, where she teaches music in Givataim and Kiryat Ono.
