= Connor Walsh =

Connor Walsh may refer to:

- Connor Walsh (ballet dancer), an American ballet dancer
- Connor Walsh (character), a character on How to Get Away with Murder
