= Catherine Hurlin =

American ballet dancer (born 1996)

- Born: January 21, 1996; New York City, U.S.
- Education: Jacqueline Kennedy Onassis School
- Occupation: Ballet dancer
- Career
- Current group: American Ballet Theatre

Catherine Hurlin (born 1995 or 1996) is an American ballet dancer. She joined the American Ballet Theatre (ABT) in 2014 and was promoted to principal dancer in 2022.

== Early life ==
Hurlin was born in New York City and raised in Westchester County, New York. Her mother, was a Paul Taylor Dance Company dancer and left the company when she was 14 weeks pregnant with Hurlin. Her father was a stage manager with the company and later Broadway Cares/Equity Fights AIDS's production manager. Hurlin started creative movement at age three, then ballet at age five. When she was eight, her mother sent her to Westchester Dance Academy, a competitive dance school, where Hurlin trained in jazz and lyrical dance in addition to ballet, and performed around the East Coast on weekends. At age 11, she competed at the Youth America Grand Prix, and won a scholarship to the Jacqueline Kennedy Onassis School (JKO School). At the time, she preferred lyrical dance and later recalled her mother "dragged" her to the school, though gradually found herself enjoying ballet and decided to pursue it professionally.

== Career ==
Between age eleven and thirteen, Hurlin performed in the Radio City Christmas Spectacular as Clara. In 2010, whilst she was a student with the JKO School, she created the role of Young Clara in Alexei Ratmansky's The Nutcracker, which was performed by the American Ballet Theatre.

Hurlin first danced with the American Ballet Theatre's Studio Company, then became an apprentice with the main company in 2013, and a corps de ballet member in 2014. In 2015, she danced Taylor's Company B, which had been created when her mother was in his company. Whilst in the corps de ballet, she also created a role in Morris' After You, and the role of Mademoiselle Marianne Chartreuse in Ratmansky's Whipped Cream. She also performed solo roles in The Sleeping Beauty, La Bayadère, Le Corsaire, Don Quixote, Giselle, Swan Lake, Ratmansky's The Firebird and MacMillan's Romeo and Juliet.

Hurlin was promoted to soloist in 2018. The following year, she represented ABT at the Erik Bruhn Prize with colleague Aran Bell. The pair performed a pas de deux from Don Quixote and Let Me Sing Forevermore, which was created for them by Jessica Lang. Hurlin won the female category. Since her promotion, she created several roles, including Hail in Ratmansky's The Seasons, Greased Lighting in Tharp's A Gathering of Ghosts and in Whiteside's New American Romance. She had also appeared as Young Jane Eyre in Marston's Jane Eyre, in Lang's Garden Blue, Tharp's In the Upper Room and Deuce Coupe.

In March 2020, Hurlin originated the role of Callirhoe in Ratmansky's full-length ballet Of Love and Rage in Costa Mesa, California. However, ABT's spring season, which included the New York premiere and some of Hurlin's major debuts, was cancelled due to the COVID-19 pandemic. During the pandemic, she and Bell, who were quarantining together, performed Let Me Sing Forevermore at Central Park, filmed for ABT's virtual gala in May 2020. In March 2021, Hurlin performed the world premiere of Ratmansky's Bernstein in a Bubble, created while a group of ABT dancers were in a bubble in Upstate New York earlier that year. In the summer, she took part in the company's eight-city tour, performing outdoors and mainly with members of the corps de ballet.

In 2022, at the company's first season at the Metropolitan Opera House since the pandemic, Hurlin danced as Kitri in Don Quixote, Odette/Odile in Swan Lake, and Callirhoe in the New York premiere of Of Love and Rage. Towards the end of the season, she was promoted to principal dancer.

== Repertoire ==
Hurlin's repertoire with the American Ballet Theatre includes:

Ballet (roles)	Choreographer
Aftereffect	Marcelo Gomes
AFTERITE	Wayne McGregor
La Bayadère (Lead D'Jampe; Third Shade)	Natalia Makarova after Marius Petipa
The Brahms-Haydn Variations	Twyla Tharp
Company B	Paul Taylor
Le Corsaire (Odalisque)	Anna-Marie Holmes after Konstantin Sergeyev and Marius Petipa
Deuce Coupe	Twyla Tharp
Don Quixote (Kitri, Flower Girl)	After Marius Petipa and Alexander Gorsky; staged by Kevin McKenzie and Sandra Jones
Firebird (Lead Maiden)	Alexei Ratmansky
Garden Blue	Jessica Lang
Giselle (Giselle; Myrta; peasant pas de deux)	After Jean Coralli, Jules Perrot, and Marius Petipa; staged by Kevin McKenzie
Her Notes	Jessica Lang
I Feel The Earth Move	Benjamin Millepied
In the Upper Room	Twyla Tharp
Jane Eyre (Young Jane)	Cathy Marston
Like Water for Chocolate (Gertrudis)	Christopher Wheeldon
Manon (Lescaut's Mistress)	Kenneth MacMillan
The Nutcracker (Clara, the Princess; Canteen Keeper; Nutcracker's Sister; Spanish Dance)	Alexei Ratmansky
On the Dnieper (Olga)	Alexei Ratmansky
Romeo and Juliet (Juliet, Harlot)	Kenneth MacMillan
The Seasons (Hail, Bacchante)	Alexei Ratmansky
The Sleeping Beauty (Princess Florine; The Fairy Violente; The White Cat; Cinderella)	Marius Petipa, staged and additional choreography by Alexei Ratmansky
Songs of Bukovina	Alexei Ratmansky
Swan Lake (Odette/Odile; pas de trois; Big Swan)	Kevin McKenzie after Marius Petipa and Lev Ivanov
Thirteen Diversions	Christopher Wheeldon

=== Created roles ===
Ballet (roles)	Choreographer
After You	Mark Morris
A Gathering of Ghosts (Greased Lighting)	Twyla Tharp
Let Me Sing Forevermore	Jessica Lang
New American Romance	James Whiteside
Of Love and Rage (Callirhoe)	Alexei Ratmansky
Praedicere	Michelle Dorrance
The Seasons (Hail)	Alexei Ratmansky
Whipped Cream (Mademoiselle Marianne Chartreuse)	Alexei Ratmansky
