= Connor Walsh (ballet dancer) =

American ballet dancer (born 1986)

- Born: 1986 (age 38–39); Fairfax, Virginia
- Occupation: Ballet dancer
- Career
- Current group: Houston Ballet

Connor Walsh (born 1986) is an American ballet dancer who currently performs as a principal dancer with the Houston Ballet.

Born in Fairfax, Virginia, and raised in Maryland, Walsh began dance training at the age of seven with his mother, Constance Walsh. He continued his training with a year each at the Kirov Academy of Ballet in Washington, D.C., and the Harid Conservatory in Boca Raton, Florida. In 2001, he started at the Houston Ballet's Ben Stevenson Academy.

Walsh joined Houston Ballet as a member of the corps de ballet in 2004, the year he won the first annual gold award from the National Foundation for Advancement in the Arts. He was promoted to soloist in March 2006 and principal dancer in September 2007.

His repertoire includes Albrecht in Giselle, the Prince in Swan Lake, The Sleeping Beauty, The Nutcracker, Basilio in Don Quixote, and Colas in Sir Frederick Ashton's La fille mal gardée. Leading roles created for Walsh include Stanton Welch's ballet Marie (February 2009), Welch's new staging of La Bayadère (February 2010), and Jorma Elo's ballet ONE/end/ONE (May 2011).
