= Simon Ball =

American ballet dancer

- Born: 1976 (age 49–50); Pittsburgh, Pennsylvania
- Occupation: Ballet dancer
- Career
- Current group: Houston Ballet
- Former groups: Boston Ballet

Simon Ball (born 1976) is a former American professional ballet dancer and was as a principal dancer with the Houston Ballet and the Boston Ballet.

== Early life and education ==
Born in Pittsburgh, Pennsylvania, Ball trained with the School of American Ballet, the Pittsburgh Ballet Theatre, The Conservatory of Point Park College, and American Ballet Theatre's School of Classical Ballet. At the age of 18, he received a gold medal from the 1994 USA International Ballet Competition in Jackson, Mississippi, and a gold medal at the 1994 Rudolf Nureyev International Ballet Competition in Budapest, Hungary.

== Career ==
After spending time performing as a guest artist in the United States and abroad, Ball joined Boston Ballet as member of the corps de ballet in 1995. He was promoted to soloist in 1996 and principal in 1999. He left Boston in 2003 to join Houston Ballet as a principal dancer.

His repertoire includes Prince in The Sleeping Beauty, the slave in Le Corsaire, Oberon in A Midsummer Night's Dream, the prince in Cinderella, Albrecht in Giselle, Romeo in Romeo and Juliet, Basilio in Don Quixote, Siegfried in Swan Lake, Colas in La Fille mal gardée, Vershinin in Winter Dreams, and Ivan in The Firebird.

In 1999, he was invited to perform at the Benois de la Danse in Berlin, Germany.

== Personal life ==
Ball's sister April is a Principal Dancer with Les Ballets de Monte Carlo and former principal dancer with Boston Ballet. In 1996 he married Frances Perez, while both were dancing with the Boston Ballet.
