= Bridgett Zehr =

American ballet dancer (born c. 1985)

Bridgett Zehr (born c. 1985) is an American ballet dancer. After terms with the Houston Ballet and the National Ballet of Canada, she joined the English National Ballet in 2011 as a principal.

== Biography ==
Born in Sarasota, Florida, Zehr trained from the age of seven with the Sarasota Ballet School and later with the Harid Conservatory in Boca Raton. When she was 17, she joined the Houston Ballet as an apprentice, working with Maina Gielgud there and becoming a soloist in 2006. The National Ballet of Canada in Toronto took her on as a soloist in 2007, promoting her to principal dancer in 2009. In both Houston and Toronto, she established a close personal and professional relationship with Zdenek Konvalina. Following Konvalina, in 2011, she joined the English National Ballet as a principal dancer. She has danced principal roles in several classical ballets including The Sleeping Beauty, Swan Lake and Giselle and in works by George Balanchine such as Apollo (ballet) and Jewels. She received the Rolex Dancers First Award in 2009 for dancing the title role in Davide Bombana's Carmen.
