= Yuanyuan Tan =

Chinese ballet dancer

Yuan Yuan Tan
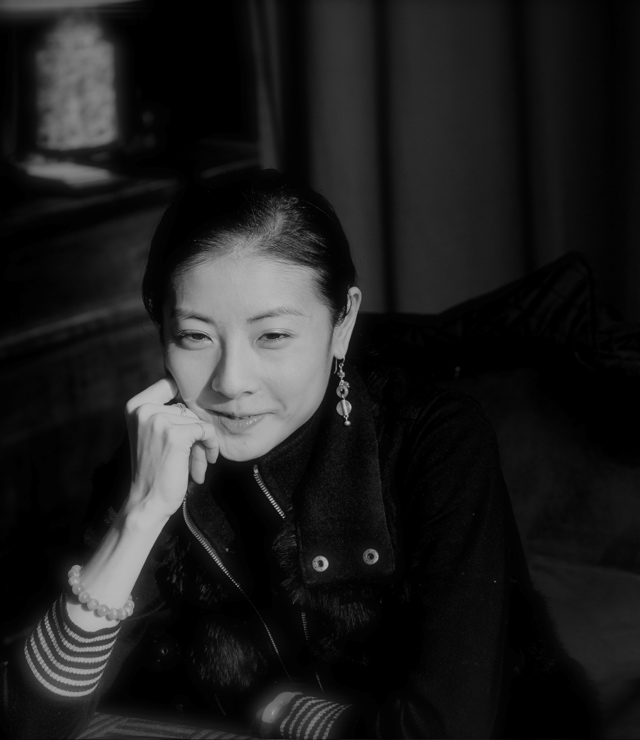
- Born: Tan Yuanyuan; February 14, 1976 (age 50); Shanghai, China
- Dancing career
- Current group: San Francisco Ballet

Yuan Yuan Tan (simplified Chinese: 谭元元; traditional Chinese: 譚元元; pinyin: Tán Yuányuán; born February 14, 1976) is a retired Chinese ballet dancer who was a principal dancer with the San Francisco Ballet.

== Biography ==
She entered Shanghai Dance School at the age of 11. Initially her father opposed this, as he wanted her to become a medical doctor. Her mother, however, was very supportive. Her fate was settled by a coin toss – the coin landed on heads and Yuan Yuan Tan started her dancing career.

She won multiple international awards at an early age; including a gold medal and the Nijinsky Award at the 1st Japan International Ballet and Modern Dance Competition (1993) and a gold medal in the 5th International Ballet Competition in Paris (1992). At age 18, she became a soloist dancer with the San Francisco Ballet. Two years later, in 1997, at age 20, she was promoted to principal dancer, attaining the highest position for a ballet dancer, an unusually rapid upward path. She was at that time the youngest principal dancer ever in the history of the San Francisco Ballet. Today, she is a marquee name for the company, while San Francisco Ballet itself is widely considered to be among the best in the world and in the words of choreographer Mark Morris, the "best company in North America".

She has danced lead female roles in Helgi Tomasson's Giselle, Swan Lake, Romeo and Juliet, Nutcracker, Tomasson/Possokhov's Don Quixote, Morris' Sylvia, and Lubovitch's Othello. She created roles in Tomasson's The Fifth Season, Chi-Lin, Silver Ladders and 7 for Eight; Possokhov's Magrittomania, Damned and Study in Motion; Wheeldon's Continuum and Quaternary and Welch's Tu Tu. Her repertory includes Ashton's Thaïs Pas de Deux; Balanchine's Symphony in C, Theme and Variations, Concerto Barocco, Prodigal Son and Apollo; Duato's Without Words, Robbins' In the Night, Dances at a Gathering and Dybbuk; and Makarova's Paquita.

She has been featured in the Chinese versions of Vogue, Esquire, and Tatler. Currently she is also a brand ambassador for Van Cleef & Arpels and Rolex.

On October 16, 2013, Tan had appeared in Christopher Wheeldon's Ghosts and Cinderella at the David H. Koch Theater and the same year appeared in Edwaard Liang's Symphonic Dances.

In 2020, after 7 months off stage since March 2020 due to COVID-19, Tan appeared in the second season of Dance Smash, a Chinese talent show produced by Hunan Satellite TV that features the technology to capture diverse dance styles in motion.

In January 2024, Tan announced her retirement from the San Francisco Ballet company, her final performance was as Marguerite in Frederic Ashton's Marguerite and Armand on February 14, 2024.

== Award ==
She received in 2025 a Carnegie Corporation of New York Great Immigrant Award

== Personal life ==
Tan married biotech worker Michael Tung on April 8, 2023. She filed for divorce on January 22, 2025. As of April 2026, the case is ongoing.
