= Madrid Ballet =

General information
- Name: Madrid Ballet
- Local name: Ballet Madrid
- Year founded: 2005
- Principal venue: Teatro Madrid
- Website: Official Website

Senior staff
- Company manager: Tomas Lozano

Artistic staff
- Artistic Director: Maria Graciani
- Resident Choreographers: Pascal Touzeau

Madrid Ballet was established in 2005 in Madrid, Spain. The Madrid Ballet specializes in contemporary ballet works, giving new choreography and presentation to classic stories, rather than the traditional classical ballet repertoire, or neoclassical ballet works. New media is incorporated into many of Madrid Ballet's performances.

== Overview ==
Madrid Ballet performs original works of contemporary ballet, many choreographed by the company's own choreographer, Pascal Touzeau. The company also performs occasional works by other contemporary choreographers, with a focus on new choreographers. The company describes itself as having the goal "to combine the different artistic expressions such as cinema, dance and narration; flowing into each other to create new plastic and emotional experiences involving all our senses". New media, such as projected cinema images, electronic sound, and modern lighting effects are intrinsic parts of the contemporary ballet productions. Modern narrative techniques are also used in typical Madrid Ballet performances. The company also performs works from the classical ballet tradition, in coordination with Teatro Madrid. The company is also very active in education programs, working with schools to teach students about dance. The company tours throughout Spain.

== Company ==
Madrid Ballet does not have a fixed troupe of dancers. New dancers are auditioned for each production, and rehearsals begin within days of the auditions finishing.

== Repertoire ==
Madrid Ballet has performed original choreography for the following works: The Red Shoes, Requiem, A Midsummer Night's Dream and The Legend of the Nutcracker.

== See also ==
- Ballet company
- Glossary of ballet
