= Dominic Walsh Dance Theater =

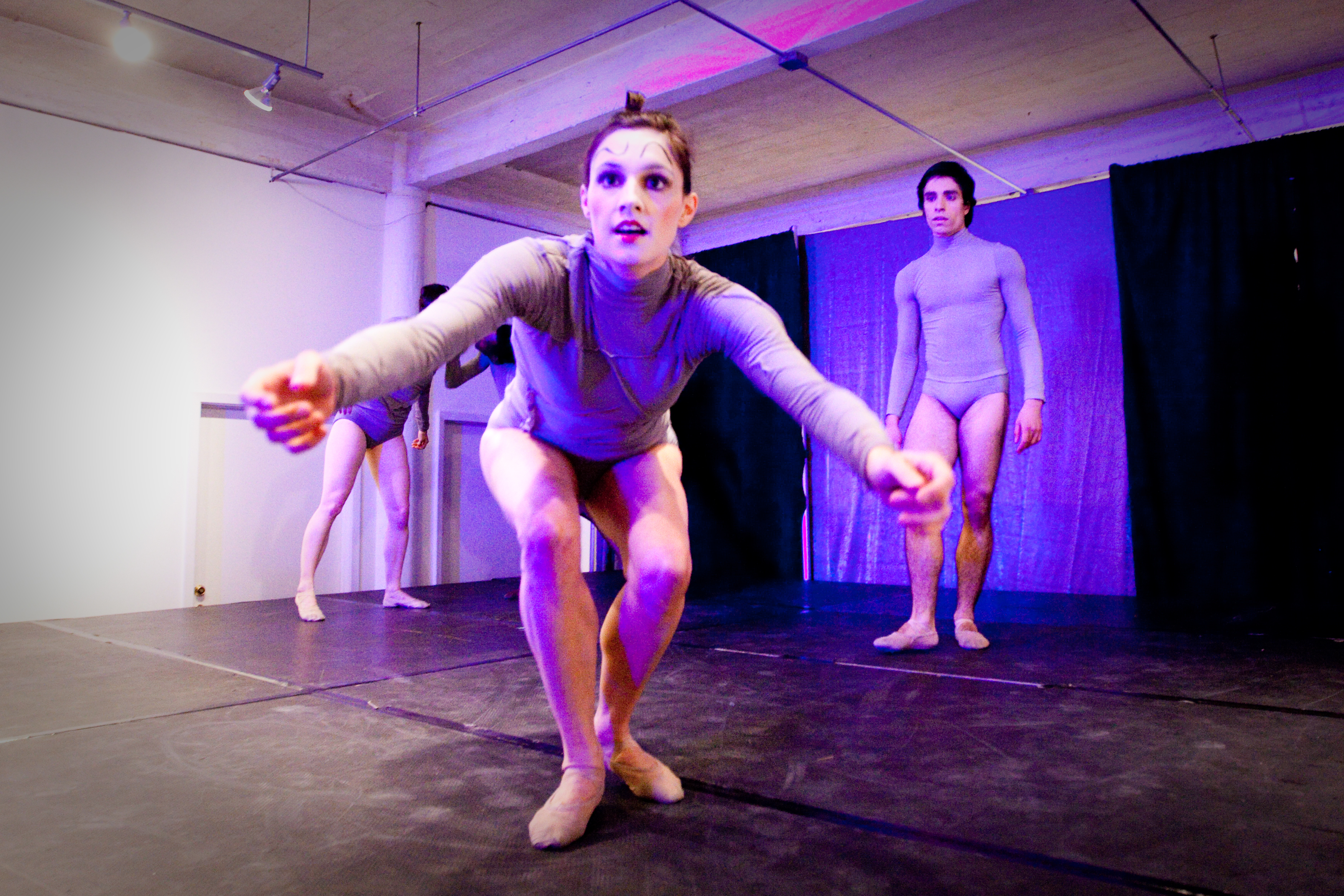
The Dominic Walsh Dance Theater at Houston Artopia 2010.

Dominic Walsh Dance Theater (DWDT) was a contemporary dance company based in Houston, Texas. Started by artistic director and former principal dancer for the Houston Ballet, Dominic Walsh, DWDT ranged from progressive to classical choreography.

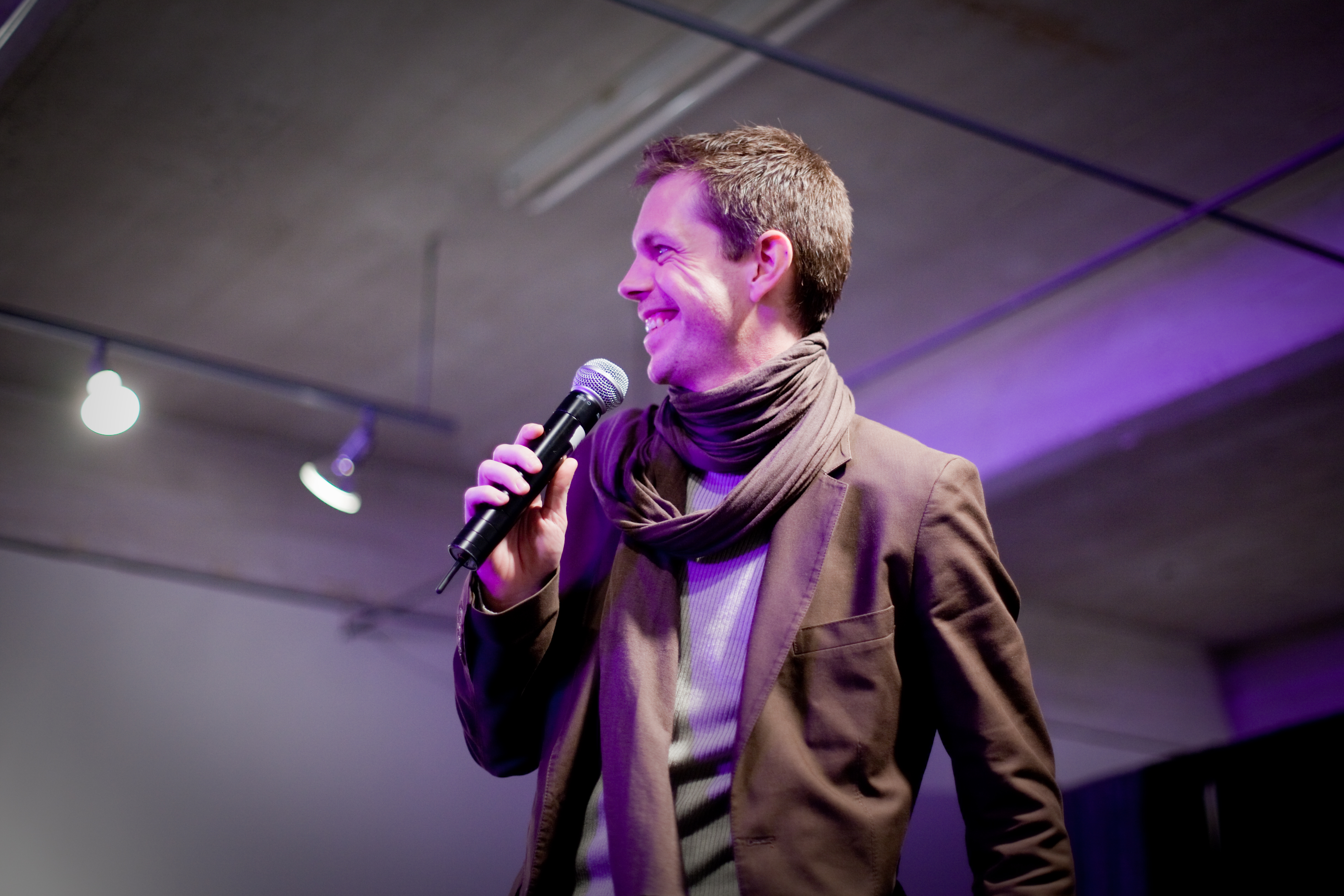
Dominic Walsh in 2010

Dominic Walsh joined the Houston Ballet in 1989, rising to Principal Dancer in 1996. In 1998, he created Flames of Eros when Ben Stevenson invited him to choreograph on Houston Ballet. His work won him the Choo San Goh Award for Choreography. In 2002, he formed Dominic Walsh Dance Theater. In 2004, the company received the title of one of the top "25 to Watch" by Dance Magazine.

Walsh closed DWDT in 2015 after 12 seasons. In December 2015, he launched a 200-page photo book, “Dominic Walsh Dance Theater,” that he created with company photographer Gabriella Nissen. The book features a collection of photos capturing moments from DWDT's repertoire.

== Dancers ==
The dancers for 2011–2012 season were:

- Domenico Luciano
- Stefania Figliossi
- Hana Sakai
- Emily McLaughlin
- Matthew Prescott
- Kathryn Thomas
- Antonio Carmena
- Carl Coomer
- Robert Dekkers
- Ashley Lynn Gilfix
