= Texas Oncology =

Texas Oncology is a network of 460+ physicians and oncology specialists who provide advanced treatment options (technology, clinical trials, and research) to cancer patients in underserved rural and urban communities throughout Texas, with one office in New Mexico and one in Oklahoma. More than 68,000 patients are treated within the Texas Oncology network annually.

Texas Oncology doctors treat cancer, blood disorders, and related chronic diseases and specialize in medical oncology, hematology, gynecologic oncology, pediatric hematology/oncology, radiation oncology, breast, and urology care.

== History ==
Founded in 1986 by several oncologists at Baylor University Medical Center at Dallas, the organization has grown to include a network of over 460 physicians at more than 210 offices in Texas, New Mexico, and Oklahoma.

Texas Oncology focuses on a community-based approach, intending to give cancer patients in underserved rural or urban areas access to care and treatment in their local communities that are generally associated with major academic or medical centers. More than 80 percent of all cancer treatment is delivered in an outpatient setting.

== Research ==
In association with US Oncology, physicians at Texas Oncology conduct ongoing research and regularly participate in clinical trials for most types of cancers, including lung, colon, and breast.

Texas Oncology specialists have shared research at events including the American Society of Clinical Oncology (ASCO) Annual Meeting and San Antonio Breast Cancer Symposium (SABCS) among others.

== Locations ==
Texas Oncology has over 550 physicians in 300 locations across the state of Texas. In Texas, there are Texas Oncology practices in primary metropolitan areas including Austin, Dallas/Fort Worth, and Houston as well as rural areas such as West Texas and the Texas Panhandle.
