= Trey McIntyre =

American dancer and choreographer

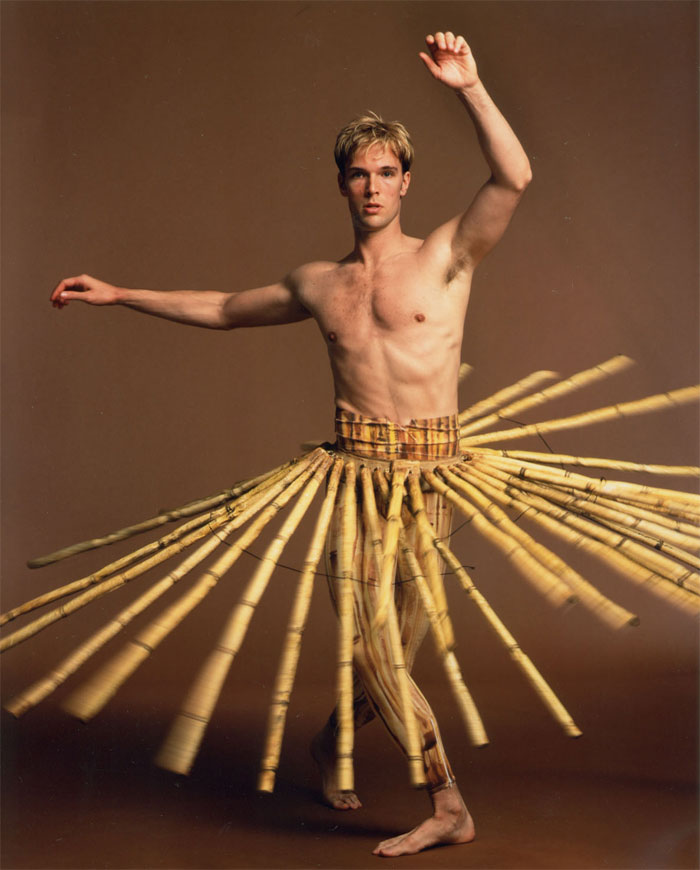
- Known for: Dance
- Website: https://treycool.com/

Trey McIntyre (born November 12, 1969) is an American dancer and choreographer, who has a body of work that includes around 100 original dance pieces. He founded and acted as president of Trey McIntyre Project, a dance company that was based in Boise, Idaho, until the company disbanded in June 2014.

== Career ==
McIntyre was born in Wichita, Kansas, and trained at North Carolina School of the Arts and Houston Ballet Academy. In 1989, he was appointed Choreographic Apprentice to Houston Ballet, a position created especially for him, and in 1995 he became the company’s Choreographic Associate. He has worked for 27 years as a freelance choreographer, producing over 100 pieces during the span of his career so far.

In 2005, McIntyre founded his dance company, Trey McIntyre Project (TMP), which first appeared at the Vail International Dance Festival. The company was initially a summer touring company, but its national and international success led McIntyre to establish the company year-round as of 2008, based in Boise, Idaho. TMP has been featured in The New York Times, Dance Magazine, and on PBS NewsHour, and has earned coast-to-coast acclaim from the likes of the Los Angeles Times, Chicago Tribune, The Boston Globe, People Magazine, and elsewhere. In 2013, Trey McIntyre Project expanded its artistic vision and announced a crowdsourced documentary film entitled Ma Maison. The project was announced on Kickstarter on August 7, 2013, and in November 2013, McIntyre went to New Orleans to begin filming.

On January 16, 2014, it was announced that McIntyre would move the Trey McIntyre Project towards new artistic ventures, reducing his efforts in dance. The company revealed a press release explaining that McIntyre, after contributing heavily to the dance world, is interested in exploring other art forms, specifically film and the visual arts. He will continue to create pieces on a freelance basis but the dance aspect of Trey McIntyre Project is downsizing as he makes room for other artistic projects.

McIntyre is the recipient of numerous awards, including a Choo San Goh Award for Choreography, an Achievement Award from North Carolina School of the Arts, and a Lifetime Achievement Award from the National Society of Arts and Letters, as well as two grants for choreography from the National Endowment for the Arts. His works have been performed by companies including Stuttgart Ballet, American Ballet Theatre, Queensland Ballet, Hubbard Street Dance Chicago, New York City Ballet, The Washington Ballet, Smuin Ballet, Oregon Ballet Theatre, and San Francisco Ballet.
