= Tatiana Semenova =

Tatiana Semenova (July 17, 1920–September 24, 1996) was a Russian-born ballet dancer and dance teacher. She was the founding director of the Houston Ballet Academy.

Semenova was born in Petrograd (now St. Petersburg), Russia, but moved with her family to Paris, France when she was five. At the age of seven, Semenova began studying with Mathilde Kschessinska.

After several years of practice, Semenova made her dancing debut at the age of 11 with a Russian opera company formed in London. The next year she began her formal ballet career as a member of the Ballet Russe de Monte Carlo, touring the United States and South America.

In 1937 Semenova joined the Opéra russe à Paris as its premiere danseuse. During World War II, she formed a group called the Foxhole Ballet to tour military installations in Europe and Africa with the USO. While performing in Rome, Italy on a bomb-damaged stage, she severed the cartilage in her knee and fractured her arm. Unable to dance any longer, in 1946 Semenova moved to the U.S. to begin her teaching career at Carnegie Hall's School of Dance.

In 1950, she formed the American Youth Ballet in Baton Rouge, Louisiana. In 1954, Semenova moved the American Youth Ballet to Houston, Texas. The following year, the newly formed Houston Foundation for Ballet asked her to help found the Houston Ballet Academy, which still exists today. She was director of the academy for 11 years.

In 1968, Semenova formed her own company, Ballet of Houston, which thrived until the mid-1980s. After the company disbanded, Semenova continued to teach privately until her death in 1996.

Semenova is buried next to her mother in the cemetery of St. Michael Island in Venice, Italy.
