= Deal with the Devil (disambiguation) =

Deal with the Devil is a cultural motif elemental to many Christian folktales.

Deal with the Devil may also refer to:

- Deal with the Devil (album), a 2000 album by Lizzy Borden, or the title song
- "Deal with the Devil" (Pop Evil song)
- "Deal with the Devil", a song by Judas Priest from Angel of Retribution
- "Deal with the Devil", a song by Dale Watson from the 2001 album Every Song I Write is for You
- "Deal with the devil", a song by Japanese singer Tia
  - The opening theme for the anime series Kakegurui

== See also ==
- Dealing with the Devil: My Mother, Trump and Me, a 2020 book by Tony Schwartz, critical of Donald Trump
- Cuphead: Don't Deal with the Devil, a 2017 video game
