= Pascal Touzeau =

French Dancer and Choreographer

Pascal Touzeau (born 1969) is a French dancer and choreographer of contemporary dance.

Touzeau studied dance at the conservatoire de Bordeaux. A professional dancer since 1987, he started as a dancer at the Opéra national de Bordeaux, then Bonn, Wiesbaden and finally the Ballet de Francfort directed by William Forsythe. Touzeau became choreographer in Germany, France, Sweden and the Netherlands before being appointed head of the Ballet Carmen Roche in Madrid (2005 to 2006).

Touzeau has been director of the Staatstheater Mainz since 2009.
