= Christopher Bruce =

British choreographer and performer (born 1946)

- Born: 3 October 1946 (age 79); Leicester, England
- Career
- Former groups: Ballet Rambert
- Dances: Cruel Garden, Ghost Dances, Sergeant Early's Dream, Intimate Pages, Swansong, Moonshine and Rooster.

Christopher Bruce CBE (born 3 October 1945 in Leicester) is a British choreographer and performer. He was the Artistic Director of the Rambert Dance Company until 2002.

== Career ==
Bruce trained at the Rambert School and became a dancer with the Rambert Dance Company in 1963. Since 1969, he has regularly choreographed for Ballet Rambert, and was appointed as the associate director in 1975. He was awarded the London Evening Standard's first dance award in 1974. From 1986 to 1991 he was the associate choreographer of the English National Ballet, and in 1989 he was also appointed as resident choreographer for Houston Ballet. Additionally, Bruce has choreographed for operas and musicals including Joseph and the Amazing Technicolor Dreamcoat (1972), Jeeves (1975), and Mutiny (1985). Since the 1980s, he has revised and created new works for companies around Europe. He received the International Theater Institute Award for excellence in international dance in 1993.

Bruce was appointed artistic director of Rambert Dance Company in 1994. He has since worked on growing the company from seventeen to twenty-five dancers to be trained as an ensemble that can link contemporary dance and ballet. He has commissioned new works by Jiří Kylián and other internationally recognized choreographers.

Bruce was appointed a CBE for a lifetime's service to dance because he was one of Britain's leading choreographers. He has been a visiting honorary professor at the University of Exeter since 2009.

He has also been given an Honorary Doctor of Art from De Montfort University, Honorary Doctor of Letters from University of Exeter in 2001 and an Honorary Life Membership of Amnesty International.

== Choreography ==
In many of his works, Bruce seeks to address global problems. Wings (1971) deals with themes of human conflict and isolation, and for those who die as cattle (1972) addresses the horrors of war. Ghost Dances (1981) as well as Silence Is the End of Our Song (1983, for the Royal Danish Ballet) are about dictatorship in South America, and convey a universal message concerning the inhumanity of totalitarian regimes. His full length work, Cruel Garden (1977), which he created in collaboration with mime artist Lindsay Kemp, draws from the works of Federico García Lorca in three acts. He has also created works with comedic content such as Night with Waning Moon (1979), in which he uses stock characters from Commedia dell'arte.

Much of Bruce's early work was influenced by Tetly, a style that emerged from both ballet and Graham technique. He has also taken inspiration from folk dance, which is evident in his use of complicated footwork and connection to musicality. Bruce's more recent works have used popular music and implemented social dance steps. The Dream Is Over (1986, for the Cullberg Ballet) used music by John Lennon, Rooster (1991, for the Geneva Ballet) used music by the Rolling Stones, and Moonshine (1993, for Netherlands Dance Theater 3) used music by Bob Dylan. Bruce has often favored the use of existing music, and frequently uses it as a creative starting point for his choreography.
