= Texas Ballet Theater =

Ballet company in Fort Worth, Texas, U.S.

General information
- Name: Texas Ballet Theater
- Previous names: Fort Worth Ballet Association
- Year founded: 1961; 65 years ago
- Website: texasballettheater.org

Senior staff
- Executive director: Jill Caughron, Interim

Artistic staff
- Artistic director: Tim O'Keefe

Other
- Associated schools: Texas Ballet Theater School

The Texas Ballet Theater was founded by Margo Dean in 1961 as the Fort Worth Ballet Association, in Fort Worth, Texas. At the invitation of Dean, Fernando Schaffenburg was invited to direct the company the following year. It became a fully professional ballet company in 1985. In 1988, after the demise of Dallas Ballet, the company began adding performances of The Nutcracker in Dallas in a business partnership with The Dallas Opera, producing Nutcracker performances in The Music Hall and using The Dallas Opera Orchestra.

Fort Worth Ballet became the Fort Worth Dallas Ballet in 1994 when The Dallas Supporters of FWDB, a separate 501(c)3 corporation with its own board of directors, was established in Dallas. The Dallas Supporters' responsibility was primarily to raise contributed funds so that Fort Worth Dallas Ballet could perform a full season in Dallas in the Music Hall at Fair Park. A detailed joint venture agreement was established between the two organizations. FWDB – the Fort Worth organization – remained the primary employer and producing entity. All dancers, production staff and most administrative staff were employees of FWDB. The Dallas Supporters hired a small administrative staff. Each season, FWDB and The Dallas Supporters would negotiate an agreement outlining which and how many productions would occur in Dallas.

The two organizations operated under this two-corporation, two-board structure for nine seasons. In 2001, the Dallas Supporters were not able to raise the funds needed to produce the Ballet's Dallas season, forcing FWDB to cancel productions planned in Dallas for early 2002; one Fort Worth production was also cancelled. This occurred during a season when FWDB had no permanent artistic director. Bruce Marks was serving as artistic advisor and Bruce Simpson as Ballet-Master-in-Chief.

Over the 2002–2003 season, an agreement to merge the two corporations and their boards was created. The resulting organization was then renamed Texas Ballet Theater in 2003.

Texas Ballet Theater, currently under artistic director Tim O'Keefe is a resident company of Nancy Lee and Perry R. Bass Performance Hall in Fort Worth and the Margot and Bill Winspear Opera House at the AT&T Performing Arts Center in Dallas.

== Artistic staff ==
As of June 2023:

- Tim O'Keefe - Artistic Director
- Ben Stevenson, O.B.E. - Artistic Director Laureate
- Li Anlin - Assistant Artistic Director

== Company dancers ==
As of March 2026:

=== Principals ===
- Alexander Kotelenets
- Paige Nyman
- Andre Silva
- Nicole Von Enck
- Brett Young

=== Soloists ===
- Amanda Fairweather
- Rieko Hatato
- Adeline Melcher
- Riley Moyano
- Dara Oda
- Samantha Pille
- Katelyn Rhodes
- Kyle Torres-Hiyoshi
- Henry Winn

=== Corps de Ballet ===
- Jackson Bayhi
- AvaRose Dillon
- Eli Go
- Dominiq Luckie
- Luke Maysonet
- Adam Phillips
- Jonathan Robbins
- Anastasia Tillman
- Rayleigh Vendt
- Sophie Williams
- Hannah Wood

=== Apprentices ===
- Alexandria Diemoz

=== Trainees ===
- Zoe Schulte
- Alyssa Ramirez
- Evan Ray

== Directors ==
=== Artistic Directors ===
- Margo Dean 1961–1964
- Fernando Schaffenburg, 1964-
- Anthony Salatino, 1982–1985
- Nanette Glushak and Michel Rahn, 1985–1987
- Paul Mejia, 1987–1998
- Ben Houk, 1998–2001
- Bruce Marks, Artistic Advisor; Bruce Simpson, Ballet-Master-in-Chief, 2001–2002 (interim leadership)
- Ben Stevenson, Artistic Advisor, Tim O'Keefe, Ballet Master, 2002–2003 (interim leadership)
- Ben Stevenson, 2003–2022
- Tim O'Keefe, 20222023 (interim leadership)
- Tim O'Keefe, 2023–present

=== Executive Directors ===
- Tom Adams
- Mark Denton, 1988–1990
- David Mallette, 1990–2005
- Gary Wortley, 2005
- John Toohey, 2006–2008
- Margo McCann, Managing Director, 2008–2014
- Terri Sexton, 2014–2016
- Vanessa Logan, 2016–present
