= Stanton Welch =

Australian dancer and choreographer (born 1969)

Stanton Welch AM
- Born: 1969 (age 55–56); Melbourne, Australia
- Occupation(s): Dancer and choreographer
- Career
- Current group: Houston Ballet
- Former groups: The Australian Ballet

Stanton De Burgh Welch AM (born 1969) is an Australian dancer and choreographer. He is the artistic director of the Houston Ballet.

== Early life ==
Welch was born in Melbourne to Marilyn Jones and Garth Welch, two prominent Australian dancers.

== Career ==
Welch was initially trained at the dance school run by his parents. In 1989, after a year as a scholarship student at the San Francisco Ballet School, Welch was accepted into the Australian Ballet where he became a leading soloist.

While with The Australian Ballet, Welch developed an interest in choreography and, in 1990, received his first commission. By 1995, he had been appointed a resident choreographer with the Australian Ballet and, in 2003, he was also appointed artistic director of the Houston Ballet.

Welch has received choreographic commissions from many international companies including the Australian Ballet, the Houston Ballet, the American Ballet Theatre, the Atlanta Ballet, BalletMet, the Birmingham Royal Ballet, the Royal Danish Ballet, the San Francisco Ballet and the Moscow Dance Theatre.

Welch is also known for staging works for Colorado Ballet, Cincinnati Ballet, Tulsa Ballet, the Texas Ballet Theater, the Royal Ballet School, the Singapore Dance Theatre, the Royal New Zealand Ballet and Fugate/Bahiri Ballet NY.

Since 2006, Welch serves as a Jury Member for the Young America Grand Prix.

== Works ==
- The Three of Us (1990)
- A Time to Dance (1990)
- Of Blessed Memory (1991)
- Passion and Canon (1992)
- Before the Rain (1993)
- Divergence (1994)
- Corroboree (1995)
- Madame Butterfly (1995)
- Red Earth (1996)
- Maninyas (1996)
- Cinderella (1997)
- The Wish (1998)
- X (1999)
- Indigo (1999)
- Bruiser (2000)
- Fingerprints (2000)
- Clear (2001)
- Within You Without You: A Tribute to George Harrison (2002)
- Tu Tu (2003)
- Velocity (2003)
- Carmina Burana (2003)
- Bolero (2004)
- Blindness (2004)
- Tales of Texas (2004)
- Falling (2005)
- Nosotros (2005)
- Sleeping Beauty (2005)
- Swan Lake (2006)
- Punctilious (2007)
- A Doll's House (2008)
- Mediæval Bæbes (2008)
- Marie (2009)
- La Bayadère (2010)
- The Young Person's Guide to the Orchestra (2014)
- Romeo & Juliet (2015)
- Sylvia (2019)
