= Ben Stevenson (dancer) =

British ballet dancer (1936–2026)

Benjamin Stevenson OBE (4 April 1936 – 29 March 2026) was a British ballet dancer with The Royal Ballet and English National Ballet, co-director of National Ballet of Washington, D.C. (1971–1974), artistic director of Chicago Ballet (1974–1975), artistic director of Houston Ballet (1976–2003), and artistic director of Texas Ballet Theater (2003–2022).

== Early life ==
A native of Portsmouth, England, Stevenson received his dance training at the Arts Educational Schools in London. Upon graduation, he was awarded the Adeline Genée Gold Medal.

== Career ==
At the age of 18, Stevenson was invited to join the Sadler's Wells Royal Ballet by Dame Ninette de Valois. A few years later, Anton Dolin invited him to dance with the London Festival Ballet, where, as a principal dancer, he performed leading roles in all the classics.

In 1967, the English National Ballet asked him to stage his first ballet, the production of The Sleeping Beauty, which starred Dame Margot Fonteyn. A year after staging the ballet in England, Stevenson arrived in the United States, and assisted other productions. At the request of Rebekah Harkness, he assumed the position of Artistic Director of the Harkness Ballet in New York City.

After choreographing Cinderella in 1970 for the National Ballet of Washington, D.C., he joined the company in 1971 as co-director with Frederic Franklin. That same year, he staged a new production of The Sleeping Beauty in observance of the inaugural season of the John F. Kennedy Center for the Performing Arts.

After a brief association with Ruth Page's Chicago Ballet, in 1976, Stevenson was appointed artistic director of the Houston Ballet, which he developed into one of the world's top 20 ballet companies, according to a number of sources. During his tenure, he expanded the company's repertory by acquiring the works of other choreographers, commissioning new works, staging classics and choreographing original works.

In 1978, Stevenson offered Chinese dancer Li Cunxin a six-week scholarship to the United States and later on his defection from China to the United States, offered him a position with the company. Cunxin returned to The Houston Ballet where he danced at the gala for Stevenson's retirement after 27 years with the company.

Arts critic Molly Glentzer called Stevenson "a master of the traditional story ballet". He choreographed in Paris and Beijing, the National Ballet at the Kennedy Center, the Joffrey Ballet in New York, and La Scala in Milan, among other locations. He worked with Margot Fonteyn. He taught Jane Seymour dance when she was 13.

In 2003, he was named Director Emeritus of Houston Ballet and the company's academy was renamed the Ben Stevenson Academy.

In July 2003, Stevenson accepted the position of artistic director of Texas Ballet Theater (TBT) in Fort Worth. In 2022, Stevenson was named Artistic Director Laureate in recognition of his lengthy tenure. Stevenson was succeeded as Artistic Director by Tim O'Keefe.

In the Bruce Beresford 2009 film Mao's Last Dancer, Stevenson was portrayed by Canadian actor Bruce Greenwood.

== Death ==
Stevenson died in Fort Worth on 29 March 2026, aged 89.

== Awards ==
Stevenson received numerous awards for his choreography, including three gold medals at the Varna International Ballet Competitions of 1972, 1982, and 1986. In addition, he staged his ballets for the Harkness Ballet, English National Ballet, American Ballet Theatre, the Paris Opera Ballet, La Scala in Milan, Rome Opera House, the Munich State Opera Ballet, The Joffrey Ballet, London City Ballet, Ballet de Santiago, The Perm State P. I. Tchaikovsky Opera and Ballet Theatre and for many companies in the United States.

For his contributions to international dance, Stevenson was appointed an Officer of the Order of the British Empire (OBE) by Queen Elizabeth II in the 2000 New Year Honours. In April 2000, he was presented with the Dance Magazine Award. In 2018, Stevenson was acknowledged by the People's Republic of China government as one of the most influential foreign experts in the past 40 years from the time that the PRC initiated its policy on reform and opening up.
