= Houston Ballet's Ben Stevenson Academy =

Ballet school in Houston, Texas

Coordinates: 29.901196°N 95.621352°W

General information
- Name: Houston Ballet's Ben Stevenson Academy
- Local name: Houston Ballet Academy
- Year founded: 1955
- Founder: Tatiana Semenova
- Principal venue: Houston Ballet Center for Dance
- Website: houstonballet.org/about/academy/

Senior staff
- Director: Jennifer Sommers

Artistic staff
- Ballet Master: Claudio Muñoz
- Associate Director of Programs and Productions: Beth Everitt

Other
- Parent company: Houston Ballet

Houston Ballet's Ben Stevenson Academy is a ballet training school affiliated with the Houston Ballet. The academy is housed in Houston Ballet Center for Dance in Houston, Texas.

== History ==
During the 1950s, Houston Ballet Academy was established under the leadership of Tatiana Semenova, a former dancer with the Ballet Russe de Monte Carlo. In July 2003, Houston Ballet Academy was renamed Houston Ballet's Ben Stevenson Academy in honor of Ben Stevenson, former artistic director of the professional company and director of the academy. Shelly Power has been the Academy's director.

== Divisions ==
=== Main School Division ===
Children age seven and older may audition for admission into Levels 1-8 of the Main School program. Auditions are held twice a year. Students follow a structured sequence of training stages designed to increase their technical skills, stamina and discipline in accordance with their age and physical development.

=== Pre-Professional Division ===
Houston Ballet II (HBII) is the top level and pre-professional division of the Academy, and students attend daily class taught by instructors from both the Academy and the Houston Ballet company.
