= Houston Ballet =

Ballet company in the USA

General information
- Name: Houston Ballet
- Year founded: 1969
- Location: 601 Preston St, Houston, TX 77002
- Website: houstonballet.org

Senior staff
- Executive director: Sonja Kostich

Artistic staff
- Artistic director: Stanton Welch AM; Julie Kent (dancer)

Other
- Associated schools: Houston Ballet Academy

Houston Ballet, operated by Houston Ballet Foundation, is a professional ballet company based in Houston, Texas. The company consists of 59 dancers and produces over 85 performances per year. It is the 5th largest ballet company in the United States (by number of dancers).

== History ==
Beginning in the 1930s, Ballet Russe de Monte Carlo. spent a week during the Christmas season performing for Houston audiences for 11 years. This led patrons to express a growing desire for a resident dance company within Houston.

The Houston Ballet has its origins in the Houston Ballet Academy, which was established in 1955 under the leadership of Tatiana Semenova, a former dancer with the Ballets Russes. In 1969, the foundation formed a professional ballet company under the direction of Nina Popova, also a former dancer with the Ballet Russes and the American Ballet Theatre.

== Direction ==
From 1976–2003, Ben Stevenson, a former dancer with Britain's Royal Ballet and English National Ballet, served as artistic director of Houston Ballet. Under Stevenson's leadership, the ballet transformed "from regional to international prominence".

In 1989, Kenneth MacMillan joined the company as artistic associate and worked with the company from 1989 until his death in 1992. Christopher Bruce was named resident choreographer. Bruce, who currently holds the title of associate choreographer, has set nine works on the company, including four pieces created especially for Houston Ballet.

In March 1995, Trey McIntyre assumed the position of choreographic associate. McIntyre has created seven world premieres for the company, including his first full-length production of Peter Pan. In 2003, Australian choreographer Stanton Welch was appointed as artistic director and has created numerous works for Houston Ballet.

For the company's 40th season in 2010, Stanton Welsh created a new production of La Bayadère.

In 2011 the company was the first company to win the Rudolf Nureyev Prize for New Dance, allowing the company to purchase a new piece by Jorma Elo.

In 2012, James Nelson was promoted from general manager of Houston Ballet to the role of executive director. Julie Kent joined Welch as co-artistic director in July 2023.

In 2025, James Nelson retired and Sonja Kostich started as executive director.

== Dance ==
In 1982, Sandra Organ, a Nebraska native, joined the Houston Ballet and became its first African American ballerina at the age of 19. She was promoted to soloist, and remained with the Houston Ballet until her retirement, fifteen years later.

In 1990 Lauren Anderson became the Houston Ballet's first African-American principal dancer. Anderson continued to dance with the Houston Ballet until her retirement in 2006 at the age of 41.

In July 1995, the Houston Ballet became the first full American ballet company invited by the Chinese government to tour the country. An estimated 500 million people witnessed Houston Ballet's production of Romeo and Juliet when the company's opening night performance was telecast live on Chinese television.

== Orchestra ==
Houston Ballet's first performance with a live orchestra was with the Houston Symphony. Together, they performed The Nutcracker in December 1972.

In 1983, Stevenson hired Glenn Langdon as music director. Langdon implemented the concept of a fully auditioned orchestra and increased the size of the string section. Langdon left Houston Ballet in 1989. After his departure, a series of guest conductors led the next season, including John Lanchbery and Jack Everly.

Ermanno Florio, who had been a guest conductor during the 1991–92 season, was appointed music director in 1992. Florio retired at the end of 2023-2024 season, and Simon Thew was promoted from associate conductor to chief conductor and music director.

During the 2025-2026 season, the Houston Ballet Orchestra was made up of 66 musicians. Additionally, there are many full-time professional pianists and several part-time pianists and percussionists who play for classes and rehearsals.

== Center for Dance ==
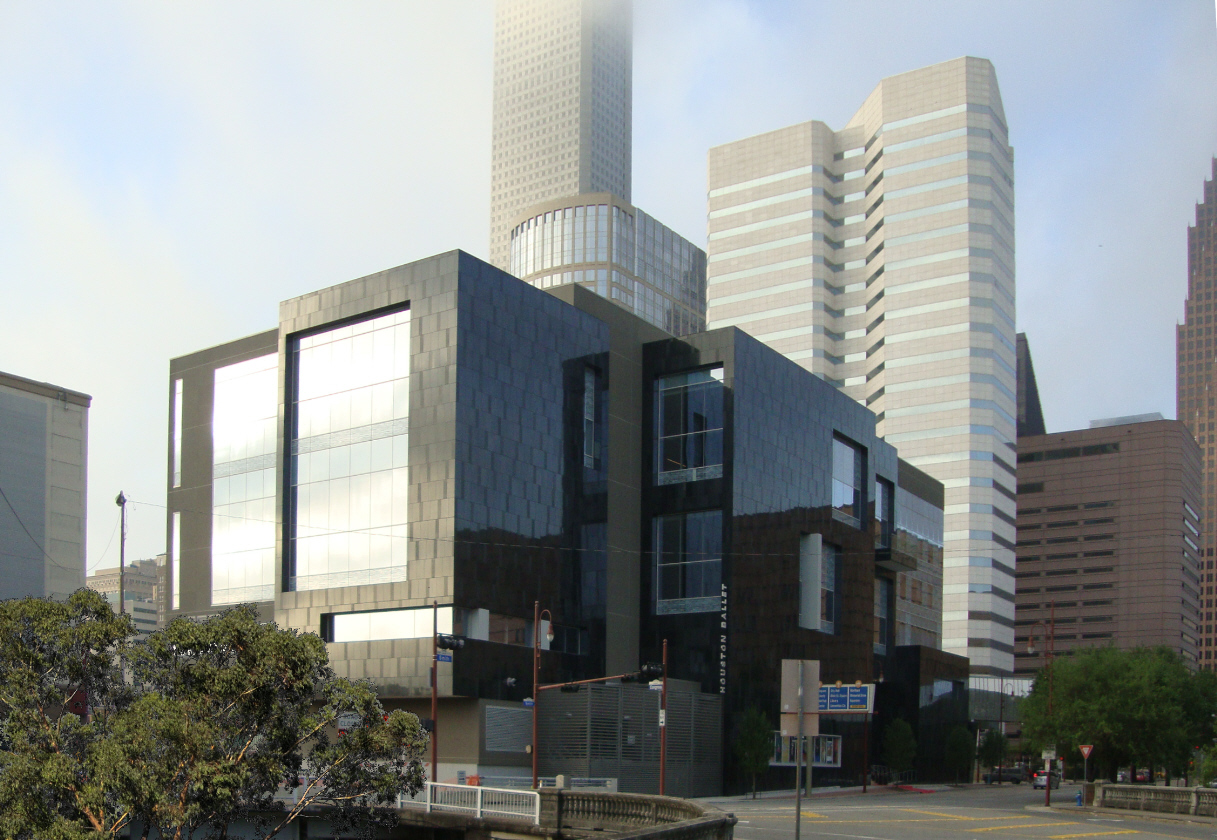
Houston Ballet Center for Dance, the administrative headquarters

With 115,00 square feet spread over six floors and containing nine studios, the Houston Ballet Center for Dance designed by Gensler is the largest building dedicated to a professional dance company in the United States. The first floor of the Center houses the Margaret Alkek Williams Dance Lab, a facility that is regularly used for educational performances, lecture series, design meetings, and rehearsals. In addition to administrative offices, the Center has a costume shop, shoe room, music library, the Houston Ballet Academy Studios, the Professional Company's Studios and Dressing Rooms.

Excavation of the building site began in July 2009. On March 10, 2010, Houston Ballet hosted a party with dancers, staff members, donors, and friends to sign the last construction beam. In the end, the new building cost $46.6 million. Staff moved into the building in February 2011, and then-Mayor Annise Parker presided over the ribbon-cutting on April 9.

In 2022, the center was renamed to Margaret Alkek Williams Center for Dance after philanthropist Margaret Alkek Williams made a $10 million legacy gift to the ballet.

== Displacement by Hurricane Harvey ==
On August 26, 2017, Hurricane Harvey hit the city of Houston. Both the Houston Ballet Center for Dance and the Wortham Theater Center took on water, leaving the company and Academy without rehearsal and performance space just as the 2017–18 season was set to open. Nevertheless, the Houston premiere of Kenneth MacMillan's Mayerling took place on schedule at the nearby Hobby Center for the Performing Arts.

While Hurricane Harvey affected operations at Houston Ballet temporarily, the damage incurred within the Wortham Theater Center, was extensive. The Wortham received 12 feet of water and remained closed for the rest of the season. Damage included destruction of costumes from around 50 ballets, which accounts for 60 percent of the repertoire. Houston Ballet executive director Jim Nelson said the company would suffer about a $12 million economic impact over three years recovering from Hurricane Harvey. In order to preserve the 2017–18 season, Houston Ballet launched its Hometown Tour and presented its planned season at alternate venues, including The Hobby Center for Performing Arts, Smart Financial Centre at Sugar Land, Houston Grand Opera's Resilience Theater at the George R. Brown Convention Center, the General Assembly Hall at the George R. Brown Convention Center, and Jones Hall.

== Houston Ballet on film ==
In 2009, the autobiography of former Houston Ballet principal dancer Li Cunxin, Mao's Last Dancer, was made into a film by Australian director Bruce Beresford. It premiered on September 13, 2009, at the Toronto International Film Festival, was nominated for several Australian film awards, and won the AACTA Award for Best Original Music Score.

The documentary dance performance film Sons de L'âme (Sounds of the Soul) was choreographed by Houston Ballet artistic director Stanton Welch and featured 16 Houston Ballet dancers. It premiered at the Théâtre des Champs-Élysées in Paris in October 2013 and debuted in the US on November 16, 2014, at the 2014 Houston Cinema Arts Festival. It is set to piano pieces by Frédéric Chopin, performed by Lang Lang.

== Nutcracker Market ==
Houston Ballet Nutcracker Market was conceived by trustee Preston John Frazier Jr. in 1981 as a European style bazaar (Christmas market) to support dance scholarships, and is now a four-day event in November.
