= Wilhelm Burmann =

German dancer, ballet master, and teacher (1939–2020)

- Born: April 3, 1939; Oberhausen, North Rhine-Westphalia, Germany
- Died: March 30, 2020 (aged 80); New York City, New York, United States
- Occupations: Ballet master, ballet dancer, teacher
- Partner: Alfonso Catá

Wilhelm "Willy" Burmann (April 3, 1939 – March 30, 2020) was a German dancer, ballet master, and teacher.

== Early life ==
Burmann was born on April 3, 1939, in Oberhausen, North Rhine-Westphalia, Germany, where he grew up on a farm. He had one sister, Christel Weideman. He began training as a dancer when he was fifteen years old.

== Career ==
Burmann was a principal dancer for companies including Frankfurt Ballet, Grand Théâtre du Genève, and Stuttgart Ballet. He also danced with companies including New York City Ballet, Pennsylvania Ballet, and New Jersey Ballet. Burmann retired from dancing in 1977.

Burmann was a ballet master at the Washington Ballet and the Ballet du Nord. He was also known for his professional dance classes at Steps on Broadway in Manhattan, which he taught from 1984 until March 20, 2020, when the coronavirus pandemic required classes to be suspended. He had also taught at the Melissa Hayden School of Ballet, Harkness Ballet School, and Ballet Arts, and had been a guest member of faculty at companies including American Ballet Theatre, New York City Ballet, Paris Opera Ballet, La Scala, Ballet Nacional Sodre, and The Australian Ballet. His teaching style, which was fast-paced and demanding, has been compared to that of George Balanchine, for whom Burmann danced for four years. Burmann was described by The New York Times in 2004 as "easily the most revered New York ballet teacher of his era".

Some of Burmann's students included Alessandra Ferri, Julio Bocca, Maria Kowroski, Wendy Whelan, Alexandra Ansanelli, Ángel Corella, and Michele Wiles.

== Personal life and death ==
Burmann's longtime partner was Alfonso Catá, who was also a dancer and had been the artistic director of Ballet du Nord. Catá died in 1990 of a brain tumor.

Burmann began to grow ill in 2018, though he did not ease his teaching schedule. He died on March 30, 2020, in Mount Sinai West hospital from renal failure, after COVID-19 complicated his treatment.
