= Barcelona Ballet =

Spanish classical ballet company

General information
- Name: Barcelona Ballet
- Previous names: Corella Ballet
- Year founded: 2008
- Founders: Ángel Corella
- Principal venue: Gran Teatre del Liceu, Barcelona
- Website: https://www.balletdebarcelona.com/

Artistic staff
- Artistic director: Ángel Corella

Other
- Orchestra: Barcelona Symphony and Catalonia National Orchestra
- Associated schools: Barcelona Ballet Summer Intensive
- Formation: Principal; First Soloist; Soloist; Corps de Ballet; Apprentice

The Barcelona Ballet was a classical ballet company based in Barcelona, Catalonia, Spain. Formerly called the Corella Ballet, the company was founded by dancer Ángel Corella, who is the current artistic director of Philadelphia Ballet. The company toured through Spain and internationally.

== History ==
In April 2008, Corella established the first classical ballet company in Spain in 20 years: Corella Ballet, Castilla y Leon. In February 2012, it moved to Barcelona and became the Barcelona Ballet.

The company had its world premiere in La Granja, Segovia, Spain on July 11, 2008 performing a mixed program of Bruch Violin Concerto, Clear and In the Upper Room. Its first full-length ballet was La Bayadère (staging by Natalia Makarova) on September 4, 2008 at the Teatro Real in Madrid, Spain.

Barcelona Ballet has since gone on to expand its repertoire and gain a great following across both Spain and the rest of the world. They were a touring company performing in many theatres across Spain, including Teatro Real, Madrid and the Liceu, Barcelona. They have performed internationally at the New York City Center (March 2010) as well as at the Los Angeles Music Center and Santa Barbara, California. They have toured cities such as New Orleans, Seattle, Charleston,(Spoleto Festival ), Spoleto, Italy, and at the Guadalajara book festival, Mexico in November 2010.

Barcelona Ballet returned to New York City Center in April 2012 with a world premiere of Pálpito by Spanish choreographers Rojas y Rodriguez, and music by Hector Gonzalez Sanchez, as well as visiting Purchase NY, Detroit, Houston.

== Repertoire ==
=== full length ===
- La Bayadère (Natalia Makarova after Marius Petipa)
- Swan Lake (Corella after Ivanov and Petipa)

=== triple bill and pas de deux ===
- After the Rain pas de deux (Christopher Wheeldon)
- Apollo pas de deux (George Balanchine)
- Bruch Violin Concerto (Clark Tippet)
- Clear (Stanton Welch)
- Corsaire Suite
- DGV: Danse à Grande Vitesse (Christopher Wheeldon)
- Diana and Actaeon pas de deux
- Don Quixote pas de deux
- Epimitheus (Russell Ducker)
- Facing the Light (Kirill Radev)
- Fancy Free (Jerome Robbins)
- In the Upper Room (Twyla Tharp)
- Satanella pas de deux
- Pálpito (Rojas y Rodriguez)
- Paquita (Angel Corella after Joseph Mazilier)
- Sleeping Beauty Suite
- SOLEÁ pas de deux (María Pagés)
- String Sextet (Angel Corella)
- Sunny Duet (Vladimir Vasiliov and Natalia Kasatkina)
- Suspended in Time (Corella, Ducker and Radev)
- Tschaikovsky Pas de Deux (George Balanchine)
- VIII (Christopher Wheeldon)
- Walpurgisnacht (Leonid Lavrovsky)
- We got it good (Stanton Welch)
- Who Cares? (George Balanchine)

== Dancers ==
The company currently consists of dancers chosen from over a thousand applicants coming from many countries: Spain, Cuba, France, Japan, Russia, United Kingdom

=== Principal dancers ===
- Carmen Corella
- Ángel Corella
- Dayron Vera

=== Principal guest dancers ===
- Alina Cojocaru
- Paloma Herrera
- Sarah Lane
- Gillian Murphy
- Herman Cornejo
- Nehemiah Kish
