= Charles Askegard =

American ballet dancer

Charles Askegard is an American ballet dancer and ballet master at Philadelphia Ballet.

== Early life and education ==
Askegard was born in Minneapolis, Minnesota, on January 6, 1969, and began his dance training at the age of five with Loyce Houlton and the Minnesota Dance Theatre. He continued his studies in Minneapolis until the age of 16, spending one summer at the School of American Ballet.

== Career ==
Askegard joined American Ballet Theatre as a member of the corps de ballet in 1987, and was promoted to soloist in 1992. In 1997, he left ABT to join New York City Ballet as a soloist and was promoted to principal the next year.

Askegard appeared in PBS's Live from Lincoln Center broadcast, "New York City Ballet's Diamond Project: Ten Years of New Choreography" in 2002, dancing in Them Twos and two years later in the Live from Lincoln Center broadcast, "Lincoln Center Celebrates Balanchine 100," in Vienna Waltzes. He has been a guest artist with Pacific Northwest Ballet, Ballet Etudes of South Florida, Bayerisches Staatsballett, Philippine Ballet Theatre, The Daring Project and Stars of American Ballet. He also appeared in Fred Wiseman's 1995 documentary film Ballet.

Askegard danced his farewell performance the last day of the fall 2011 season, Sunday, October 9; the program consisted of the Diamonds pas de deux from Jewels, Episodes, In Memory of ... and Western Symphony. He planned to form his own ballet company, Ballet Next, with former ABT principal dancer Michele Wiles.

== Personal life ==
Askegard was married to author Candace Bushnell from 2002 to 2011.

== Repertory ==
=== Created roles ===
==== Peter Martins ====
- Harmonielehre
- River of Light
- Swan Lake
- Them Twos
- Thou Swell
- Viva Verdi

==== Eliot Feld ====
- Organon

==== Robert La Fosse ====
- Duke!

==== Helgi Tomasson ====
- Prism, Diamond Project, 2000

==== Christopher Wheeldon ====
- Carnival of the Animals

=== Featured roles ===
==== George Balanchine ====
- Allegro Brillante
- Apollo
- Brahms-Schoenberg Quartet
- Concerto Barocco
- Coppélia
- Cortège Hongrois
- Firebird
- The Four Temperaments
- Jewels: Diamonds
- Ivesiana
- Kammermusik No. 2
- Liebeslieder Walzer
- A Midsummer Night's Dream
- Monumentum pro Gesualdo
- Movements for Piano and Orchestra
- The Nutcracker
- Orpheus
- Robert Schumann's Davidsbündlertänze
- Scotch Symphony
- Serenade
- Stars and Stripes
- Stravinsky Violin Concerto
- Swan Lake
- Symphony in C
- Tschaikovsky Pas de Deux
- Tschaikovsky Piano Concerto No. 2
- Tschaikovsky Suite No. 3
- Union Jack
- Vienna Waltzes
- Walpurgisnacht Ballet
- Western Symphony
- Who Cares?

==== Jerome Robbins ====
- The Four Seasons
- Glass Pieces
- In Memory of ...
- In the Night
- Ives, Songs

==== Peter Martins ====
- Barber Violin Concerto
- Fearful Symmetries
- Morgen
- Naïve and Sentimental Music
- The Sleeping Beauty
- The Waltz Project

==== Eliot Feld ====
- Intermezzo No. 1
- The Unanswered Question
