= Angel Corella =

Spanish ballet dancer (born 1975)

- Born: Angel Corella López; Madrid, Spain
- Occupation: Artistic Director
- Years active: 1995–present
- Dancing career
- Current group: Philadelphia Ballet

Angel Corella López is a Spanish former principal dancer with the American Ballet Theatre (the only Spaniard to have achieved such a position in history) and guest artist with The Royal Ballet, Kirov Ballet, New York City Ballet, La Scala and the Australian Ballet among many others. Since the 2014/2015 season, he has been the Artistic Director of Philadelphia Ballet (Formerly Pennsylvania Ballet).

Considered one of the leading dancers of his generation, he has received numerous awards including the Prix Benois de la Danse and the national award of Spain. He is also credited with ushering in a new era for male ballet in America, thanks to his appearance in the 2002 documentary Born to be Wild and franchise show Kings of the Dance. The New York Times said Corella gave "classical dancing, especially in the 19th-century repertory, a new image."

Having appeared on the front cover of The New York Times on various occasions, he is described as a "a dancer capable of turning performance into sensation" and as a "force of nature" by the Los Angeles Times.

After performing at the Kennedy Center Honors for the third time in 2014 he was made an official member of the artistic committee. He is the most featured dancer of the American Ballet Theatre in DVD recordings and his appearance as Prince Siegfried in the PBS presentation of Swan Lake won an Emmy Award.

Corella is the only dancer with a statue in the Madrid Wax Museum, and has both a secondary school and dance museum named after him. He has also been a judge on the Spanish version of the television show Mira Quien Baila.

On 22 July 2014, Philadelphia Ballet (Formerly Pennsylvania Ballet) announced that Corella had been appointed as its artistic director.

== Early career ==
Born and raised in Madrid, Corella trained with Karemia Moreno and Víctor Ullate and began winning dance awards at a young age, including the First Prize in the National Ballet Competition of Spain in 1991 and three years later, the Grand Prix and Gold Medal at the Concours International de Danse de Paris.

When the Russian ballerina Natalia Makarova saw the young Corella in competition, she contacted the artistic director of American Ballet Theatre and recommended that he be auditioned for the company. She described him later to the publication Dance Magazine as "exceptionally incredible [...] he is an angel who has been sent to us." He was accepted into ABT as a soloist in April 1995 and was promoted the following year (August 1996) to the rank of principal dancer.

== Professional work ==
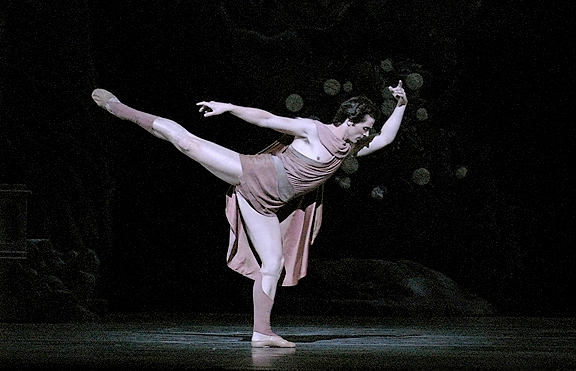
Corella in a 2005 performance as Aminta, from Frederick Ashton's ballet Sylvia

Corella has performed as a guest artist with such companies as The Royal Ballet in London, the La Scala Ballet in Milan, the New York City Ballet, the Australian Ballet, the Ballet of Tokyo, the Asami Maki Ballet, Ballet Contemporaneo de Caracas, the National Ballet of Chile and the Kirov Ballet at the Mariinsky Theatre in St. Petersburg, Russia.

Corella has danced for world leaders including Queen Elizabeth II of the United Kingdom, Queen Sofía of Spain, Princess Letizia of Spain, the Duchess of Alba and United States Presidents Barack Obama, Bill Clinton and George W. Bush. He has on several occasions been a guest at the White House.

In 2006, Corella established the touring show Kings of the Dance alongside fellow leading men Gudrun Bojesen of The Royal Danish Ballet; Johan Kobborg of the Royal Ballet; Ethan Stiefel of ABT; and Nikolay Tsiskaridze of the Bolshoi Ballet. It premiered at the Orange County Performing Arts Center in Costa Mesa, California, immediately followed by an East Coast premiere at New York City Center. In 2007, Kings of the Dance toured Russia with performances in St. Petersburg, Moscow, and Perm, Russia. The next year, Corella was the sole returning original cast member to perform it at the Mariinsky Festival. Since its inception, the franchise has been continued by various other dancers.

Corella also devised an annual touring group entitled Angel Corella and stars of American Ballet which performed throughout Spain for seven years.

Corella has also collaborated for performances with a variety of artists including actress Bette Midler, violinist Ara Malikian as well as opera singers Cecilia Bartoli and Ainhoa Arteta.

After having danced in the operatic production La Gioconda at New York's Metropolitan Opera House, Barcelona's Liceu opera house, Madrid's Teatro Real and the Teatro dell'Opera in Rome, Corella made his debut with the Paris Opera in 2013.

He has partnered ballerinas including Alessandra Ferri, Xiomara Reyes, Julie Kent, Gillian Murphy, Diana Vishneva, Alina Cojocaru, Nina Ananiashvili, Paloma Herrera, Irina Dvorovenko, Viktoria Tereshkina, Alina Somova, Evgenia Obraztsova, Alexandra Ansanelli, Michele Wiles, Stella Abrera, Letizia Giuliani, Leanne Benjamin and Lucia Lacarra.

Encouraging young professionals, he is a regular judge at several dance competitions, such as the International Ballet and Choreography competition in Beijing, and has also taught at various summer programs and dance schools, including the Royal Ballet School in London.

== The New York Times ==
In Corella's debut year with American Ballet Theatre, during a performance of Twyla Tharp's Americans We, The New York Times praised Corella's performance saying the ballet "explodes with this young dancer’s phenomenal bravura. Don’t miss him." Increasing interest from audience and critics alike led quickly to more demanding principal roles. In his debut as the lead in the ballet La Bayadere the same critic wrote, "Angel Corella was nothing short of perfect."

Described as a virtuoso for his feats of endurance, "extremely fast pirouettes suddenly speeding up rather than slowing down", Corella excelled in the most demanding roles of the classical repertoire. Upon reviewing his first performance in Le Corsaire, The New York Times said "This performance bought the house down!" The newspaper also praised his versatility: "Mr Corella is the rare dancer who has performed magnificently in each part he has been given."

Remarking on his artistic flair, the New York Times described Corella as a "highly sophisticated artist" referencing his "finely nuanced acting" and stated that "the young Spaniard could wow audiences with multiple pirouettes, but it was his joy of dance that carried the day."

It was cited that Corella was often "the star - and the heart of the show", frequently causing the audience to erupt into "feverish applause", and that "by sheer force, he put the company one step ahead."

In the year of his retirement from American Ballet Theatre, The New York Times wrote "Dancers like Angel Corella are hard to come by, and that speaks to more than just the radiance of his technique. He’s generous with his talent too."

== Roles ==
- Prince Siegfried in Swan Lake
- Des Grieux in Manon
- Romeo in Romeo and Juliet
- Albrecht in Giselle
- Peasant Pas de deux from Giselle
- Colas In La Fille Mal Gardée
- Conrad in Le Corsaire
- Ali the Slave in Le Corsaire
- Birbanto in Le Corsaire
- Lensky in Onegin
- The Prince in Cinderella
- Solor in La Bayadère
- The Bronze Idol in La Bayadere
- Basilio in Don Quixote
- Gypsy King in Don Quixote
- Danilo in The Merry Widow
- Camille in The Merry Widow
- James in La Sylphide
- Franz in Coppélia
- Cassio in Othello
- The Bluebird Pas de deux from The Sleeping Beauty
- Prince Désiré in The Sleeping Beauty
- The Nutcracker Prince in The Nutcracker
- The Cavalier in The Nutcracker
- Henry VIII in VIII
- Petruchio in The Taming of the Shrew
- The Blue Boy in Les Patineurs
- The Rose in Le Spectre de la Rose
- The Son in The Prodigal Son
- The Peruvian in Gaîté Parisienne
- Billy in Billy the Kid
- Aktaion in Artemis
- Petrouchka in Petrouchka
- Her Lover in Jardin aux Lilas
- The First Sailor in Fancy Free
- The Third Sailor in Fancy Free
- Aktaion in Artemis
- The Man from the House Opposite in Pillar of Fire
- Misgir in The Snow Maiden
- Her Lover in Weren't We Fools?
- The Dancemaster in The Lesson
- Oberon in The Dream

- Leading roles in other ballets include the following: Symphony in C, Other Dances, Push Comes to Shove, The Sleeping Beauty Act II, Within You Without You: A Tribute to George Harrison, Variations on America, Tchaikovsky Pas de Deux, Theme and Variations, The Brahms-Haydn Variations, Bruch Violin Concerto, Drink To Me Only With Thine Eyes, Ballet Imperial, Sinfonietta, Gong, Who Cares?, Variations For Four, The Leaves Are Fading, Mozartiana, Without Words, A Brahms Symphony, Stepping Stones, Americans We, and Spring and Fall, Concerto no. 1 for Piano & Orchestra, Sinatra Suite, In the Upper Room, and Allegro Brillante, among others.
- Ballets created on Corella by today's choreographers: For 4 by Christopher Wheeldon, Non Troppo by Mark Morris, The Pied Piper by David Parsons, HereAfter by Natalie Weir & Stanton Welch, Meadow by Lar Lubovitch, Baroque Game by Robert Hill, Concerto No. 1 for Piano and Orchestra by Robert Hill, Known by Heart by Twyla Tharp, Getting Closer by John Neumeier, Sin and Tonic by James Kudelka, and both Clear and We Got it Good by choreographer Stanton Welch.
- Ballets in Opera Productions: Dance of the Hours in Ponchielli's La Gioconda choreographed by George Iancu in Barcelona 2005 as well as Christopher Wheeldon's new Dance of the Hours in Ponchielli's La Gioconda for the Metropolitan Opera in New York City, 2006. (Debut performances).

== Retirement from American Ballet Theatre ==
Upon his retirement from ABT in 2012, Corella performed to a sell out audience at the Metropolitan Opera House and received a standing ovation lasting over twenty minutes. The New Yorker commemorated the occasion by caricaturing the artist. The arts journal wrote "For a long and happy time, we thought of Angel Corella, a much adored star of American Ballet theatre, simply as a king of dance. Now we are coming to know him as a native son."

== Television appearances ==
- 1996 Kennedy Center Honors
- 1998 Sesame Street
- 1999 "Reopening of the Royal Opera House, London"
- 2001 Charlie Rose
- 2000 PBS presentation of documentary film Born To Be Wild - The Leading Men of American Ballet Theatre
- 2005 (Emmy Award-winning) PBS presentation of Tchaikovsky's Swan Lake, with Gillian Murphy and Marcelo Gomes (Staging by Kevin McKenzie)
- 2006 Freixenet commercial
- 2008 Rolex commercial
- 2011 "Quien Vive Aqui"
- 2012 "Buena Fuente"
- 2014 "Mira Quien Baila"

== Corella's DVD recordings ==
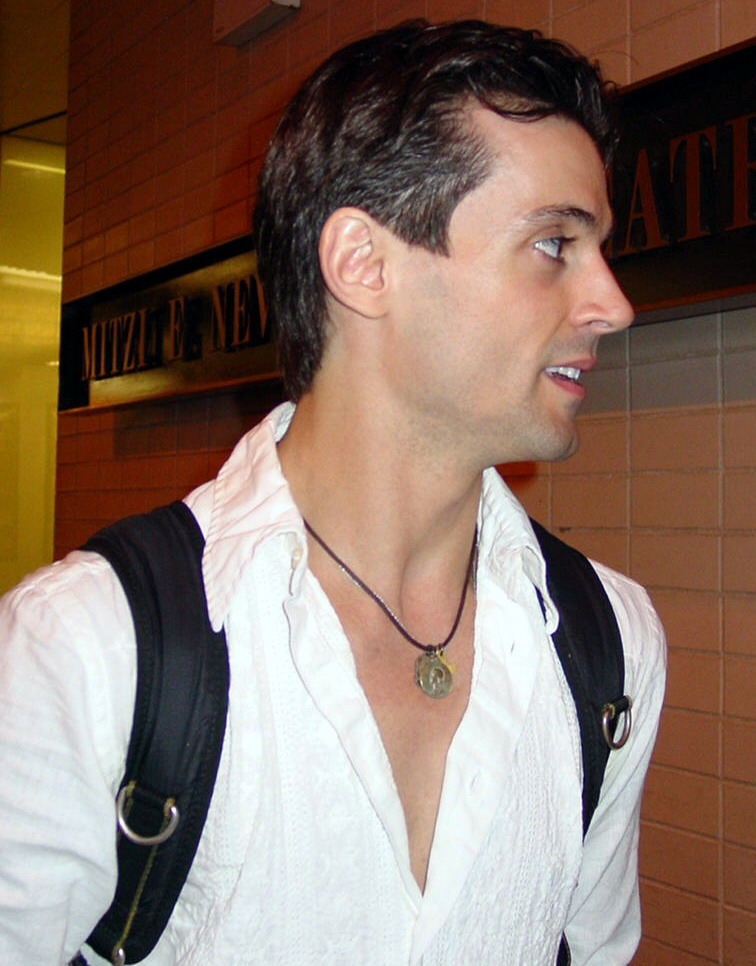
Corella backstage at the Metropolitan Opera House in 2007

- Swan Lake with Gillian Murphy (American Ballet Theatre - 2005)
- Romeo and Juliet with Alessandra Ferri (La Scala Ballet - 2000)
- Le Corsaire with Julie Kent/Ethan Stiefel (American Ballet Theatre - 1998 VHS, 2001 DVD)
- Born To Be Wild - The Leading Men of American Ballet Theatre (biographical documentary - 1999) with Vladimir Malakhov, Jose Manuel Carreño, and Ethan Stiefel.
- Don Quixote Pas de Deux with Paloma Herrera (American Ballet Theatre) on a mixed bill DVD titled American Ballet Theatre Now - Variety and Virtuosity (1996)
- "Reopening of the Royal Opera House", London (1999)
- "La Gioconda" Liceu Opera House (2005)

== Awards ==
- National Ballet Competition of Spain - First prize, May 1991
- Concours International de Danse de Paris - Grand Prix / Gold Medal, December 1994
- Prix Benois de la Danse, 2000
- National Award of Spain, 2003
- Premio Protagonista, Luis del Olmo, 2005
- Men's Health award, 2007
- Dance Europe Magazine DANCER OF THE YEAR Award, 2007
- Leonid Massine Award, 2008
- International medal from the community of madrid, 2008
- International Medal of Arts, Madrid, Spain, 2009
- Gold Medal the academy of fine arts, Cadiz
- Galileo 2000 Award, Florence, 2009
- Sports and Culture award, Barcelona, 2011

== Barcelona Ballet ==
In April 2008, Corella established the first classical ballet company in Spain in 20 years, the Corella Ballet, Castilla y Leon; in February 2012, it moved to Barcelona and became the Barcelona Ballet.

The company had its world premiere in La Granja, Segovia, Spain on 11 July 2008 performing a mixed program of Clark Tippet's Bruch Violin Concerto, Stanton Welch's Clear and Twyla Tharp's In the Upper Room. Its first full-length ballet was La Bayadère (staging by Natalia Makarova) on 4 September 2008 at the Teatro Real in Madrid, Spain.

Barcelona Ballet has since gone on to expand its repertoire and gain a great following across both Spain and the rest of the world. They are a touring company performing in many theatres across Spain, including Teatro Real, Madrid and the Liceu, Barcelona. They have performed internationally at the New York City Center in March 2010 as well as at the Los Angeles Music Center and Santa Barbara, California. They have toured cities such as New Orleans, Seattle, Charleston, the Spoleto Festival and the Guadalajara book festival, Mexico in November 2010.

Their repertoire includes Swan Lake, suites from Le Corsaire and The Sleeping Beauty, George Balanchine's Tschaikovsky Pas de Deux and Apollo pas de deux, Christopher Wheeldon's After the Rain pas de deux, María Pagés' SOLEÁ pas de deux, and the pas de deuxs from Diana and Actaeon, Don Quixote and Satanella; Balanchine's Who Cares?, Jerome Robbins's Fancy Free, Wheeldon's DGV: Danse à Grande Vitesse and VIII, Welch's We got it good, Russell Ducker's Epimitheus, Vasiliov and Kasatkina's Sunny Duet, Leonid Lavrovsky's Walpurgisnacht, Corella, Ducker & Radev's Suspended in Time, Corella's String Sextet, Paquita Joseph Mazilier, Facing the light Radev, and the Suite of Sleeping beauty after Petipa.

Barcelona Ballet returned to New York City Center in April 2012 with a world premiere of "Palpito" by Spanish choreographers Rojas y Rodriguez as well as visiting Purchase, NY, Detroit, Houston.

In early 2013 Corella made the decision to dissolve the company to pursue other projects, indicating that he would likely head to the United States for professional reasons.

Corella continues to perform internationally, collaborating with various artists and choreographers, and was appointed as the Artistic Director of the Philadelphia Ballet in July of 2014.
