= Suzanne Farrell: Elusive Muse =

1996 film

- Directed by: Anne Belle; Deborah Dickson
- Produced by: Anne Belle; Catherine Tambini
- Cinematography: Don Lenzer
- Distributed by: Direct Cinema Limited
- Release date: 1996
- Running time: 90 minutes
- Country: United States
- Language: English

Suzanne Farrell: Elusive Muse is a 1996 documentary film about the ballerina Suzanne Farrell directed by Anne Belle. It was nominated for an Academy Award for Best Documentary Feature. It was aired on PBS in 1997 as part of Great Performances: Dance In America.
