= Anne Benna Sims =

American danseuse

Anne Benna Sims was the first African-American danseuse at American Ballet Theatre and the first African-American soloist in the company's history. Sims' professional career began with Les Grands Ballets Canadiens where she danced in the corps de ballet. In 1972 she was invited to join the Geneva Opera Ballet by company director Alfonso Cata, who became her mentor. When Cata assumed the director position of the Frankfurt Opera Ballet, he offered Sims a position as a soloist. One year later, Sims became a principal dancer. In 1977, Sims returned to the United States and joined the Eglevsky Ballet Company as a principal dancer. In 1978, she performed in Ballet on Broadway. Sims, who joined American Ballet Theatre in late 1978, became the first African American female to hold a contract with the ABT company.

== Timeline ==
Les Grands Ballets Canadiens (1972)

Geneva Opera Ballet (1973–1975)

Frankfurt Opera Ballet: Principal (1975–1977)

Eglevsky Ballet Company: Principal (1977–1978)

American Ballet Theatre (1978)

== Early life ==
Sim's father, an architect, and mother, an opera buff, exposed the Sims children to all forms of art. At age ten Sims started ballet classes at the Long Island Institute of Music in Queens on Parsons Blvd., under the tutelage of Helene Vinson. (Another notable student was Ted Agress, who went on to perform in Broadway musical theater.) Those studies were supplemented with summer training at the ABT school under Michael Maule, Patricia Wilde, and Madame Swoboda; and at the New Dance Group Studio with Peter Saul and Margaret Craske. Her sister, Lowery Stokes Sims, is museum curator.

Sims graduated from Bishop Reilly High School in 1970. After graduating high school, Sims was accepted into the trainee program at Harkness House under David Howard and Maria Vegh. She had also trained with Helen Greenford and Elizabeth Carrol in ballet; Luigi in jazz and Teresita La Tana in Spanish dance.

== Professional career ==
Sims' professional career began with Les Grands Ballet Canadiens, where she danced in the corps de ballet. Sims danced with Les Grands Ballets Canadiens in 1972. Eventually, Sims was told that there was not much of a future for black dancers in ballet and that Harkness was not looking for her type.

Sims was introduced to Alfonso Cata in 1972. After watching a class, Cata told Sims, "I hate your dancing. You are a big girl who moves too small". Cata then offered Sims a contract with the Geneva Ballet. Since then, Cata has become her mentor, a good friend and ally who taught the "bronze beauty" to move like a big girl that she was.

Cata took over the directorship of the Frankfurt Ballet in Germany. Sims was invited as a soloist. One year later, she was promoted to principal dancer. She spent four years with the company and achieved much acclaim in ballets by Balanchine, Butler, and Cata. German dance critic Wilfried Hofmann began to refer to Sims as the ‘Judith Jamison of ballet'.

Sims grew her repertoire with castings that were on opposite ends of the movement spectrum. She played both the "cool" second violin in Balanchine's Concerto Barocco, and the world-weary lady in pursuit of a bored gentleman in Cata's Ragtime.

Sims returned to the United States in 1977 and accepted a principal contract from the Eglevsky Ballet Company. In May 1978, Dustin Hoffman and Alfonso Cata presented her in the highly successful Ballet on Broadway at the Beacon Theatre. Shortly thereafter, Sims auditioned for the famed American Ballet Theatre and was offered a corps de ballet contract.

ABT was very impressed with Sims' skills. In 1978, Anne Benna Sims officially joined the American Ballet Theatre as the first African American female to hold a contract with the company. She was the first African-American danseuse at American Ballet Theatre and the first African-American soloist in the company's history. In a 2014 interview, Misty Copeland said that Sims was part of the “corps de ballet,” or a member of the larger dance troupe, first. "I haven’t been doing the 'white' acts of Swan Lake or Giselle, but there is a bit of slush in the 'Snow' section of Peter Tchaikovsky's The Nutcracker Suite" says Sims.

Though Sims started in the corps de ballet of ABT, her first principal role was Cybele/Medusa in Antony Tudor's Undertow with Peter Fonseca, a "demanding dramatic ballet". During rehearsals, [Antony Tudor] reminded her often that everyone who has ever danced this role has been a recognized classic ballerina" just in case the public did not except her. She was also in the first cast of the company premiere of Paul Taylor's Airs.

At ABT she was in the first cast of the company premiere of Paul Taylor's Airs (reconstructed by Eileen Cropley); other members of the cast were Lisa Rinehart, Janet Shibata, Rebecca Wright, Brian Adams, Warren Conover and Robert La Fosse. (Note: Anna Kisselgoff, "Ballet: Taylor's 'Airs' and 'Sylphides'", The New York Times, April 23, 1981.) She had earlier been featured in a revival of Antony Tudor's Undertow with Peter Fonseea. (Note: Theatre World, Glenne Currie, The Hour, June 5, 1979.) (Note: Anna Kisselgoff, "Dance: 'Petrouchka' and Two Debuts", The New York Times, May 30, 1979.)
