= YCD =

YCD may refer to:

== Businesses and organisations ==
- Belarusian Young Christian Democrats (founded 2009)
- Minnesota Dance Theatre Young Children's Division (founded 1962)

== Other uses ==
- You Can Dance: Po prostu tańcz!, a televised Polish dance competition (aired 2007–2016)
- Coaling derrick (YCD), a US Navy hull classification
- Nanaimo Airport, British Columbia, Canada (by IATA code)

== See also ==
- WYCD, a radio station in Detroit, Michigan, US
