= Loyce Houlton =

American dancer and choreographer

- Born: June 13, 1925; Proctor, Minnesota, United States
- Died: March 14, 1995 (aged 69); Saint Paul, Minnesota, United States
- Known for: Dance and choreography
- Movement: Modern dance and ballet

Loyce Houlton (13 June 1925 – 14 March 1995) was an American dancer, choreographer, dance pedagogue, and arts administrator centered for most of her adult life in Minneapolis. Founder of the Minnesota Dance Theatre, she maintained connections with many of the most prominent national and international dance figures and composers of her day. She was acknowledged to be one of the most significant American choreographers of the 20th century and one of the first American women to gain national and international recognition as a choreographer, teacher, and producer.

== Early life ==
Houlton was born Loyce Johnson in Proctor, Minnesota, near Duluth, to Norwegian immigrants and immersed herself in music and dance as a child. Her early training in dance was completed at Carleton College, where she studied between 1942 and 1946 and earned a B.A. degree. After establishing herself in her career as a choreographer, she was awarded an Honorary Doctorate of Humane Letters by her alma mater in 1981.

== Study in New York City ==
In 1946, Houlton moved to New York City, where she took classes at New York University towards earning an M.A. degree in Dance Education in 1950. In the same period, she was trained in dance at the Martha Graham School by the New Dance Group. Besides Martha Graham, she also studied with Nina Fonaroff, Louis Horst, José Limón, and George Balanchine.

== Life in Minneapolis ==
In 1950, Houlton returned to Minnesota to live in Minneapolis, where she was centered for the rest of her life. She married a classmate from Carleton College, the physician William (Henry) Houlton (1923–2010) on July 28, 1950. She raised four children with her husband: Andrew, Joel, Laif, and Lise, who succeeded her mother as artistic director of the Minnesota Dance Theatre after her death in 1995.

Houlton's rise to prominence in dance circles began in the 1960s. In 1961, she began teaching dance at the University of Minnesota and in 1962 founded the Contemporary Dance Playhouse, which was renamed the Minnesota Dance Theatre in 1969. In 1964, her troupe performed its first Nutcracker Fantasy, Houlton's adaptation of Pyotr Ilyich Tchaikovsky's ballet The Nutcracker. The continuing performances of this dance work remain the longest-running annual fine arts event in the state of Minnesota. She produced many important dance works until her death, in all over 90 of them. Among the best-known are Earthsong and Tactus (1969), Wingborne (1971), The Killing of Suzie Creamcheese (1971), Dream Trilogy (1972), Song of the Earth (1977), Horseplay (1977), Carmina Burana (1978), The Haunted Landscape (1985), and The Rite of Spring (1985). She worked with the composer Carl Orff on her danced realization of his cantata Carmina Burana and also collaborated with Yanni, George Crumb, and Philip Glass for various dance works.

The period 1980-1985 was distinguished by a number of collaborations with noted video and film artists, for example the documentary Loyce with Peter Markle and Swan Lake Minnesota with Kenneth Robins, Scott Killian, and Kim Sherman. She also appeared onstage at the legendary 1983 First Avenue concert at which Prince recorded the definitive version of his composition "Purple Rain."

In 1986, the board of Minnesota Dance Theater fired Loyce Houlton, sighting budgetary problems due to her overspending. Their plan was a merger with Pacific Northwest Ballet, with hopes for more financial stability. Ted Kivitt was hired to direct the new company, and Victoria Pulkkinen and Francia Russel were brought in to teach the Pacific Northwest Ballet syllabus to the instructors of Minnesota Dance Theater. The merger was a short lived enterprise, however, and Minnesota Dance Theater suspended operations by 1988. Houlton was still living in Minneapolis, though less active in the dance scene. But by 1989, she had established A Dancer's Place out of the ashes of Minnesota Dance Theater, and was organizing classes at the Hennipin Center For The Arts. She presented a holiday show during Christmas 1989, with excerpts from her Nutcracker Fantasy, Les Patineurs, and other works at the Horst Institute in Minneapolis. Early the next year in 1990, she mounted works on Ballet Michigan in Flint, including her Right Of Spring and Knoxville, Summer Of 1915. By 1991, she had reincorporated Minnesota Dance Theater, and resumed working until her death. Her daughter Lise assumed the directorship after her mother's death, and Lise's daughters, Kaitlyn and Raina have been dancers with the company.

Houlton died of a stroke in a hospital in Saint Paul, Minnesota, on March 14, 1995.

== Influence and legacy ==
Houlton developed her own system of dance-training technique known as the Houlton Contemporary Technique. It is recognized as a symbiosis of the formal classical ballet discipline and a freer use of the torso, head, and arms, which are more characteristic of what is generally referred to as modern dance. The Houlton technique was widely used by dance companies in the United States and Europe. Houlton helped to train thousands of dance students at the Minnesota Dance Theatre, of which the most significant are Charles Askegard and her daughter Lise Houlton.

At her death in 1995, Bruce Marks, at the time artistic director of the Boston Ballet, asserted, "She belongs to that group of tenacious American women artists that includes Martha Graham and Agnes DeMille."

A large collection of Houlton's papers and memorabilia is presently housed in the University of Minnesota Performing Arts Archives.

== Choreographic works ==
- Loyce Houlton's Nutcracker Fantasy (1964)
- Earthsong and Tactus (1969)
- Wingborne (1971)
- The Killing of Suzie Creamcheese (1971)
- Dream Trilogy (1972)
- Song of the Earth (1977)
- Horseplay (1977)
- Carmina Burana (1978)
- Swan Lake Minnesota (1981)
- Triage (1983)
- Prismatics (1983)
- The Haunted Landscape (1985)
- Rite of Spring (1985)
- Keys to Imagination (1987)
- Swoop (1989)
- Tiananmen (1989)
- La Boutique Fantastique (1989)

== Bibliography ==
- Cohen-Stratyner, Barbara Naomi (1982). Biographical Dictionary of Dance. New York: Schirmer Books. ISBN 0-02-870260-3.
- Bibliographic Guide to Dance, 1975–1998. ISSN 0360-2737.
