= Heinz Spoerli =

Swiss dance maker (born 1940)

Heinz Spoerli (born 8 July 1940) is a Swiss dance maker, internationally known. After a long career as a ballet dancer and company director, he is now widely considered to be one of the foremost European choreographers of his time.

== Early life and training ==
Born in Basel into a prosperous family, Heinz Spörli was exposed to theater arts at an early age, thanks to the enthusiasm of his father. As a schoolboy, he appeared as an extra in a number of local productions and sometimes took small acting or dancing roles. At age 17, he began taking ballet classes with Walter Kleiber, a well-known local teacher, while continuing his formal education. Upon graduation from school, he completed his compulsory military service in the Swiss Army before resuming his dance training. Realizing his natural talent for ballet and hoping to make it his career, he devoted himself to his ballet classes and to his studies in dance, music, and art history. During this time, he changed the spelling of his surname from Spörli to Spoerli.

== Career ==
Despite his late start, Spoerli advanced rapidly in his dance training, and in 1960, at age 19, he was engaged as an artist of the Basel Municipal Theater, directed by Vaslav Orlikovsky. He continued to improve his classical technique while appearing in operas, operettas, and the spectacular ballet productions that Orlikovsky mounted. In 1963 Spoerli joined the Cologne State Opera Ballet, directed by Todd Bolender. There he was exposed to an international repertory of high caliber, including works of Balanchine, Béjart, Cranko, de Mille, and Lander. In 1966 he moved to Canada, having been hired as a soloist by the Royal Winnipeg Ballet, directed by Arnold Spohr. The following year, 1967, he made his first choreographies, two short pas de deux for the Calgary Ballet Company. After a brief stint back in Cologne, he returned to Canada in late 1967 as a soloist with Les Grands Ballets Canadiens in Montreal. There, under the direction of Ludmilla Chiriaeff and Fernand Nault, he danced in both classical and modern works by Dolin, Lichine, Nault, Paige, Kuch, and Butler. In 1969 Spoerli returned to Switzerland, where he danced as a soloist with the Basel Ballet, directed by Pavel Smok, and then with the Ballet du Grand Théâtre de Genève, directed by Alfonso Catá. In Geneva from 1970 to 1973 he again danced in works by Balanchine and other prominent neoclassical choreographers. There, in 1972, he also made his first major ballet, Le Chemin ("The Road"), set to an electronic score that had been commissioned from Éric Gaudibert.

The success of Le Chemin led to Spoerli's appointment as resident choreographer of the Basel Ballet in 1973 and as ballet director of the Basel Municipal Theater in 1978. Working in his hometown for almost two decades, he elevated the artistic and technical standards of the company dancers to a remarkable degree and created many works for ballet stages, for opera and operetta, and for television productions. During his tenure the Basel Ballet was recognized as one of the foremost ballet companies in all of Europe. In the autumn of 1991 Spoerli left Basel to become the director of the Rhine Opera Ballet, the resident company for Düsseldorf and Duisburg, Germany. The large roster of dancers in this company allowed him to mount productions on a grander scale than had been possible in Basel, and he took full advantage of the opportunity, creating some of his most memorable works during his sojourn in Germany. In 1996 he returned to Switzerland to assume the post of artistic director and choreographer of the Zurich Ballet. There he assembled one of the finest ensembles of dancers in Europe and continued to present his audiences with bold new productions.

Over the years, Spoerli also worked as guest choreographer for dance companies in many cities of Europe and Asia, including Paris, Berlin, Frankfurt, Stuttgart, Milan, Budapest, Vienna, Graz, Lisbon, Stockholm, Oslo, Helsinki, Hong Kong, and Singapore. His acclaimed version of La Fille Mal Gardée was, in fact, created for the Paris Opera Ballet in 1981, and his dances for Rossini's opera William Tell, the story of the Swiss folk hero, were created for the ballet of the Teatro alla Scala in Milan in 1995. Performed by his own companies, his ballets have also been seen in the United States, England, Scotland, the Netherlands, Spain, Greece, Egypt, Israel, Poland, Russia, South Africa, Japan, China, Taiwan, and Thailand.

Upon completion of his contract, Spoerli retired from his post with the Zurich Ballet in June 2012. Under the direction of his successor, the company is committed to cultivate his choreographic legacy and to preserve his works, which remain an essential part of the company's repertoire. As an independent artist, Spoerli continues to be much in demand as a guest choreographer for ballet companies around the world.

== Choreography ==
Spoerli prefers to identify himself as "dance maker" rather than "choreographer," as he believes that that term better describes the variety of theatrical dance styles and forms in which he works. Whether small and intimate or large-scale and spectacular, his dance works do indeed demonstrate a wide range of choreographic styles, from classical, neoclassical, and contemporary ballet to modern and postmodern dance to provocative, avant-garde theater pieces.

Throughout his career Spoerli often returned to classical ballets and traditional works whose dramatic or musical structure particularly interested him. His innovative production of Giselle, oder der Wilis, first presented in Basel in 1976, was later mounted in Zurich (1980), in Duisburg (1993), and again in Zurich (1998). His versions of The Firebird, A Midsummer Night's Dream, Coppélia, Romeo and Juliet, The Nutcracker, and Les Noces were all presented in more than one production, as was his Swan Lake, which was presented in its third, final revision in Zurich in 2005. For his third version of A Midsummer Night's Dream (1994), Spoerli supplemented the familiar music of Mendelssohn-Bartholdy with contemporary compositions by Philip Glass and Steve Reich, and for the fourth version, in 1996, he enhanced the confusion of identities and the senses at the heart of the plot by adding actors from the Royal Shakespeare Company as stagehands who interrupt the action, leaving audiences to wonder just what kind of innovative dance-theater piece they had witnessed. The production was revived in Zurich in 2010.

Besides evening-length classical ballets, numerous contemporary ballets with a story line or evocative meaning, such as Verklärte Nacht ("Radiant Night"), and lighthearted works such as Chäs ("Cheese"), Spoerli produced a number of neoclassical, abstract works. Among them are Goldberg Variations, In den Winden im Nichts ("Winds in the Void"), and Wäre heute morgen und gestern jetzt ("if today were tomorrow and yesterday now"), all set to music by Bach. Other neoclassical works include allem nah, allem fern ("close to everything, far from everything"), set to Mahler's Fifth Symphony; moZART (the title is a play on the composer's name and the German word for "tender"); and In Spillville, set to Dvořák's string quartet no. 12, the "American Quartet." One of his most admired creations, made for the Rhine Opera Ballet, was inspired by the life and work of the Florentine Mannerist painter Pontormo (1494–1557). Entitled . . . und Farben, die mitten in die Brust leuchten (". . . and colors that shine in the heart"), it was set to music by a wide spectrum of composers, from John Dowland (1563–1626) to Julia Wolfe (born 1958), and it included an equally wide spectrum of dance styles, ranging from Pontormo's time to the present.

Among Spoerli's many works created expressly for television are Träume ("Dreams"/"Reveries," 1979), set to music of Wagner, and König David ("King David," 1981), set to music of Honegger. Both productions starred Birgit Keil and Rudy Bryans. The 1996 and 1998 New Year's Concerts of the Vienna Philharmonic Orchestra included dances made by Spoerli for members of the Vienna State Opera Ballet, including waltzes to Johann Strauss's famous An der schönen blauen Donau ("On the Beautiful Blue Danube"). Both concerts were telecast worldwide to many millions of viewers.

== Selected works ==
- 1973: The Firebird (Stravinsky)
- 1974: Phantasien (Bartok)
- 1974: Petruschka (Stravinsky)
- 1975: Flowing Landscapes (Ives)
- 1976: A Midsummer Night's Dream (Mendelssohn-Bartholdy)
- 1976: Giselle (Adam, Burgmüller, Drigo)
- 1977: Ein Faschingsschwank (Schumann)
- 1977: Romeo and Juliet (Prokofiev)
- 1978: Chäs (Bauer, Baer)
- 1979: Catulli Carmina (Orff)
- 1979: Thundermove (Gruntz)
- 1979: The Nutcracker (Tchaikovsky)
- 1980: Vier Gesänge für Frauenchor (Brahms)
- 1981: La Fille Mal Gardée (Hérold, Hertel, Damase)
- 1982: Oktett (Reich)
- 1982: Verklärte Nacht (Schönberg)
- 1984: Coppélia (Delibes)
- 1984: John Falstaff (Jahn)
- 1986: Swan Lake (Tchaikovsky)
- 1987: Blue Light (Pärt, Bach)
- 1987: Der Wunderbare Mandarin (Bartok)
- 1987: La Belle Vie (Offenbach)
- 1988: Patently Unclear (Glass)
- 1989: Don Quixote (Minkus)
- 1989: Loops (Adams)
- 1990: Les Noces (Stravinsky)
- 1992: Die Josephslegende (R. Strauss)
- 1993: Goldberg Variations (Bach)
- 1995: The Sleeping Beauty (Tchaikovsky)
- 1996: ... und Farben, die mitten in die Brust leuchten (various)
- 1997: Nocturnes (Chopin)
- 1999: ... eine lichte, heile, schöne Ferne (Mozart)
- 2000: Cinderella (Prokofiev)
- 2003: Les Indes Galantes (Rameau)
- 2004: Daphnis et Chloé (Ravel)
- 2005: allem nah, allem fern (Mahler)
- 2007: Peer Gynt (Grieg, Turnage, Dean)
- 2008: Ideomeno (Mozart)
- 2009: Raymonda (Glazunov)
- 2010: Der Tod und das Mädchen (Schubert)
- 2011: Das Lied von der Erde (Mahler)
- 2011: In Spillville (Dvořák)
- 2012: Don Juan (Gluck)
- 2012: Till Eulenspiegel (R. Strauss)

== Videography ==
- Pulcinella (1989/2006), Basler Ballett, with Schwartz, Bennett; music, Stravinsky; Academy of St. Martin in the Fields, cond. Marriner (Pioneer Classics)
- La Fille Mal Gardée (1989/2006), Basler Ballett, with Kozlova, Jensen, Ris, Schläpfer; music, Hérold-Hertel; Wiener Symphoniker, cond. Lanchbery (Pioneer Classics)
- Summer Night Dreams (1995), Ballett der Deutschen Oper am Rhein, with Venaev, Louwen, Petit; music, Mendelssohn-Bartholdy, Glass; Wiener Philharmoniker (Pioneer Classics)
- Cinderella (2004), Zürcher Ballett, with Seneca, Jermakov; music, Prokofiev; Zurich Opera Orchestra, cond. Fedoseyev (Bel Air Classiques)
- Cello Suites: In den Winden im Nichts (2006), Zürcher Ballett; music, Bach; Herrmann, violoncello, cello (Bel Air Classiques)
- Idomeneo (2008), opera, Mozart, dir. N. Harnoncourt; with soloists of the Zürcher Ballett; Concentus Musicus Wien, cond. N. Harnoncourt; Helmut-List-Halle, Graz (styriarte Festival)
- Peer Gynt (2009), Zürcher Ballett, with Rademaker, Schepmann, Han, Quaresma; music, Grieg, Turnage, Dean; Zurich Opera Orchestra and Choir, cond. Jensen (Bel Air Classiques)
- Swan Lake (2010), Zürcher Ballett, with Semionova, Jermakov; music, Tchaikovsky; Zurich Opera Orchestra, cond. Fedoseyev (Bel Air Classiques)
- Wäre heute morgen und gestern jetzt (2011), Zürcher Ballett, with artists of the company; music, Bach; Zurich Opera Orchestra, cond. Minkowski (Bel Air Classiques)

== Awards ==
- 1982: Hans-Reinhart-Ring of the Swiss Gesellschaft für Theaterkultur
- 1985: Jacob-Burckhardt-Prize of the Goethe Foundation in Basel
- 1991: Art Prize of the City of Basel
- 2000: Award for choreography of the European Cultural Foundation
- 2002: Officier de l'Ordre des Arts et des Lettres (France)
- 2003: Golden Medal of Honor of the Governing Council of the Canton of Zurich
- 2007: Art Prize of the City of Zurich
- 2009: Deutscher Tanzpreis
- 2009: German Critics' Prize for Dance
- 2012: Zurich Festival Prize, awarded by the Bär-Kaelin Foundation
- 2012: Life for Dance Award, International Ballet Festival, Miami, Florida

== Legacy ==
Spoerli's legacy, not just to Swiss ballet but to the dance world in general, is continued through Foundation Heinz Spoerli, established in Basel in 2000 to support the preservation of dance as an art form. Periodically, the foundation makes substantial cash awards to outstanding choreographers and dancers and contributes to educational programs designed to foster public interest in dance.

In 2013, Spoerli donated his personal papers and theatrical memorabilia to the Paul Sacher Foundation, an archive and research center for the music of the twentieth and twenty-first centuries. Located in Münsterplatz, in the heart of Basel, the foundation's library contains holdings of materials from many Swiss composers and musicians as well as figures such as Stravinsky, Bartók, Berio, Boulez, Carter, and others of international renown.
