= Anne Belle =

Documentary filmmaker

- Born: June 10, 1935
- Died: June 18, 2003 (aged 68)
- Education: master
- Alma mater: New York University Graduate Institute of Film and Television

Anne Belle (June 10, 1935 – June 18, 2003), was a documentary filmmaker specializing in dancers.

== Biography ==
Anne Belle was born in Chile on June 10, 1935, but grew up in Canada and Morocco. Also living in Great Britain Belle studied ballet in London. She then moved to New York City and worked as a writer and editor. She attended New York University Graduate Institute of Film and Television where she graduated with a master's degree in Fine Arts in 1968.

Belle began working on documentary films. Her first two were shown on PBS. She created a series of films about ballet dancers. There was one on a group of dancers, Maria Tallchief, Mary Ellen Moylan, Melissa Hayden, Allegra Kent, Merrill Ashley and Darci Kistler, working with George Balanchine. Her film about Alexandra Danilova was in 1987. Her 1996 film about Suzanne Farrell was nominated for an Oscar. Belle co-directed the film with Deborah Dickson. Her films were shown in festivals around the world. Belle had been working on a documentary about ballet teacher Stanley Williams at the time of her death.

=== Personal life ===
Belle was married to architect John Belle with whom she had two children, David and Antonia. She had several stepchildren as well. Belle had a heart attack and died June 18, 2003, in Los Angeles, California.
