= Alfonso Catá =

Cuban ballet dancer, choreographer, and director

Alfonso Catá (3 October 1937 – 15 September 1990) was a Cuban ballet dancer, choreographer, teacher, and company director, active in the United States, Switzerland, Germany, and France.

== Early life and training ==
Born in Havana, Alfonso Catá was the son of a diplomat in service to the government of Fulgencio Batista, president of Cuba from 1933 to 1959. When Alfonso was a boy, his father was posted to Geneva, Switzerland, and he was educated in private schools there, adding French and English to his native Spanish. Details of his early life are obscure, but he may also have begun his ballet training with Swiss teachers. In any case, when his family moved to the United States about 1950 and settled in New York City, his interest in dance was strong enough to cause him to enroll at the School of American Ballet. There, he was trained in the principles of classical ballet technique developed by George Balanchine, to whom he would remain devoted for the rest of his life.

== Performing career ==
During his career as a dancer, Catá performed with several major ballet companies in Europe and America. In 1956, at age 19, he joined Roland Petit's Ballets de Paris, which performed in various cities in France and on tour to neighboring countries. Catá danced minor roles in many works in the company repertory, appearing on stage with Zizi Jeanmaire in Petit's Carmen and with Violette Verdy in Le Loup. After a time with this company, he left to join the Grand Ballet du Marquis de Cuevas, also based in Paris, where he appeared in the company's famous 1960 production of The Sleeping Beauty, staged by Bronislava Nijinska and Robert Helpmann and starring Nina Vyrubova and Serge Golovine. In, 1961, Catá left France and moved to Germany, where he joined the Stuttgart Ballet, then being re-formed by South-Africa-born John Cranko. He took with him his Brazilian girlfriend, Marcia Haydée, who would become Cranko's muse, prima ballerina of the company, internationally known star of Cranko's narrative ballets, and his eventual successor as artistic director of the company.

Upon returning to New York, Catá resumed his studies at the School of American Ballet and at the Joffrey School, where he improved his technical mastery. In 1964 he was among the first group of young professionals organized by Robert Joffrey into a company, along with Robert Blankshire, Wilhelm Burmann, Zelma Bustillo, Diana Carter, Luis Fuente, Hilda Morales, and Trinette Singleton. The newly named Joffrey Ballet made its debut at the New York City Center of Music and Drama in 1965, but Catá did not remain long with the troupe, soon leaving to join the corps of New York City Ballet, then resident at the New York State Theater at Lincoln Center. Although happy to be dancing the Balanchine repertory, he decided, at age 30, to retire from the stage. In 1967, he left New York City Ballet and opened a boutique, called Yasny ("You ain't seen nothin' yet"), on Manhattan's Upper West Side, where he sold dresses he had designed and Latin American pottery and jewelry. Gregarious and charming, he attracted patrons to his shop from a wide surrounding neighborhood, including Balanchine, who would sometimes stop by for a chat.

== Directorial and choreographic career ==
In 1969, Balanchine nominated Catá to become artistic director of the moribund ballet company of the Grand Théâtre de Genève. It was an attractive offer, especially because of his childhood memories of the city, and a welcome opportunity that he was glad to accept. With Balanchine acting as artistic adviser, he took over leadership of the company, made dramatic reforms, and revitalized the repertory. During the four years of his tenure (1969-1973), he introduced many of Balanchine's best works to appreciative Swiss audiences. Among them were Sérénade (music, Tchaikovsky), Symphonie en Ut (Bizet), Apollon Musagète (Stravinsky), Les Quatre Tempéraments (Hindemith), Concerto Barocco (Bach), Divertimento No. 15 (Mozart), Symphonie Ecossaise (Mendelssohn), Square Dance (Corelli and Vivaldi), and Who Cares"? (Gershwin). These masterworks were supplemented by choreographies of his own, including La Nuit de Mai (music, Leoncavallo), Les Saisons (Glazunov), Sonatine pour Violon et Percussion (Pierre Métral), Pierre et le Loup (Prokofiev), Le Carnaval des Animaux (Saint-Saěns), Nuit Transfigurée (Schoenberg), and Concerto pour Percussion, Piano, et Orchestre à Cordes (Tomás Swoboda). He also provided dances for operas and operettas: Un Ballo in Maschere (Verdi, 1970), La Belle Helène (Offenbach, 1971), L'Étoile (Chabrier, 1971), and La Veuve Joyeuse (Léhar, 1972).

Balanchine provided not only artistic advice; he sent Catá some of his most promising students from the School of American Ballet in New York. Among them were Claudia Jescke and Chris Jensen, who, at 19, partnered Violette Verdy in a Balanchine pas de deux from La Source at an international gala that Catá had organized and who would go on to a career as a principal dancer with the Basel Ballet and as ballet master of the Zurich Ballet. Other talented members of the company were the French dancer Dominique Bagouet, the English dancer David Allen, his French wife Claudine Kamoun, and the Swiss dancer Heinz Spoerli, who had established a reputation in Germany and Canada. Encouraged by Catá, Spoerli choreographed his first major ballet, Le Chemin, in 1972. The success of this work, set to a commissioned electronic score by Eric Gaudibert and performed by Ruth Weber and Chris Jensen, launched Spoerli's career as the foremost Swiss choreographer of the twentieth century.

Over the next two decades, Catá worked as artistic director of three major dance companies: the Frankfurt Ballet in Germany (1973-1977), the Baltimore Ballet in the United States (1980-1981), and the Ballet du Nord in France (1983-1990). In the intervals between these jobs, he taught at various schools in New York City and elsewhere. As founder of the Ballet du Nord in Roubaix, France, close to the Belgian border, he remained active in the post of company director, chief choreographer, and teacher until his death in 1990. He built the company repertory on fourteen Balanchine ballets and such works as Concerto, set to music of Keith Emerson by Jean-Pierre Bonnefoux, Les Nuits d'Éte, set to music of Hector Berlioz by Jean-Paul Comelin, and a number of works of his own devising. Among them were ballets to two evocative orchestral compositions: Nuits dans les Jardins d'Espagne by Manuel de Falla and La Mer by Claude Debussy. The company eventually evolved into the Centre Chorégraphique National Roubaix–Nord-Pas-de-Calais (CNN), specializing in experimental contemporary dance.

== Personal life ==
Catá's long-term companion was Wilhelm Burmann, a German dancer whom he met in Europe in the 1950s. Burmann's career was inextricably linked with Catá's own. He danced with the Stuttgart Ballet, the Frankfurt Ballet, the Joffrey Ballet, the New York City Ballet, and the Geneva company, where he also served as ballet master. He later became a popular teacher at Steps on Broadway in New York City. He survived Catá, who died at age 53 in hospital at Tourcoing, near Roubaix. Catá was also survived by a younger brother, Ernesto Hernandez-Catá, a retired economist living in the Washington area with his wife, Ximena.
