= In Memory of ... (ballet) =

In Memory of ... is a ballet in one act made by New York City Ballet ballet master Jerome Robbins to Berg's Violin Concerto (To the Memory of an Angel) of 1935 (written on the death of Manon Gropius, daughter of Alma Mahler, Gustav Mahler's widow, and Walter Gropius), based on themes from Mahler, a Carpathian folk song, and Bach's O Ewigkeit, du Donnerwort, BWV 20. The premiere took place on 13 June 1985 at the New York State Theater, Lincoln Center, with scenery by David Mitchell, costumes by Dain Marcus and lighting by Jennifer Tipton. A recording aired on PBS' Great Performances: Dance in America in 1987.

== Original cast ==
- Suzanne Farrell
- Joseph Duell
- Adam Lüders

== Reviews ==
- NY Times by Anna Kisslegoff, June 15, 1985
- NY Times by Jack Anderson, June 26, 2001
- NY Times by Gia Kourlas, June 16, 2008
