= Suzanne Farrell =

American ballerina

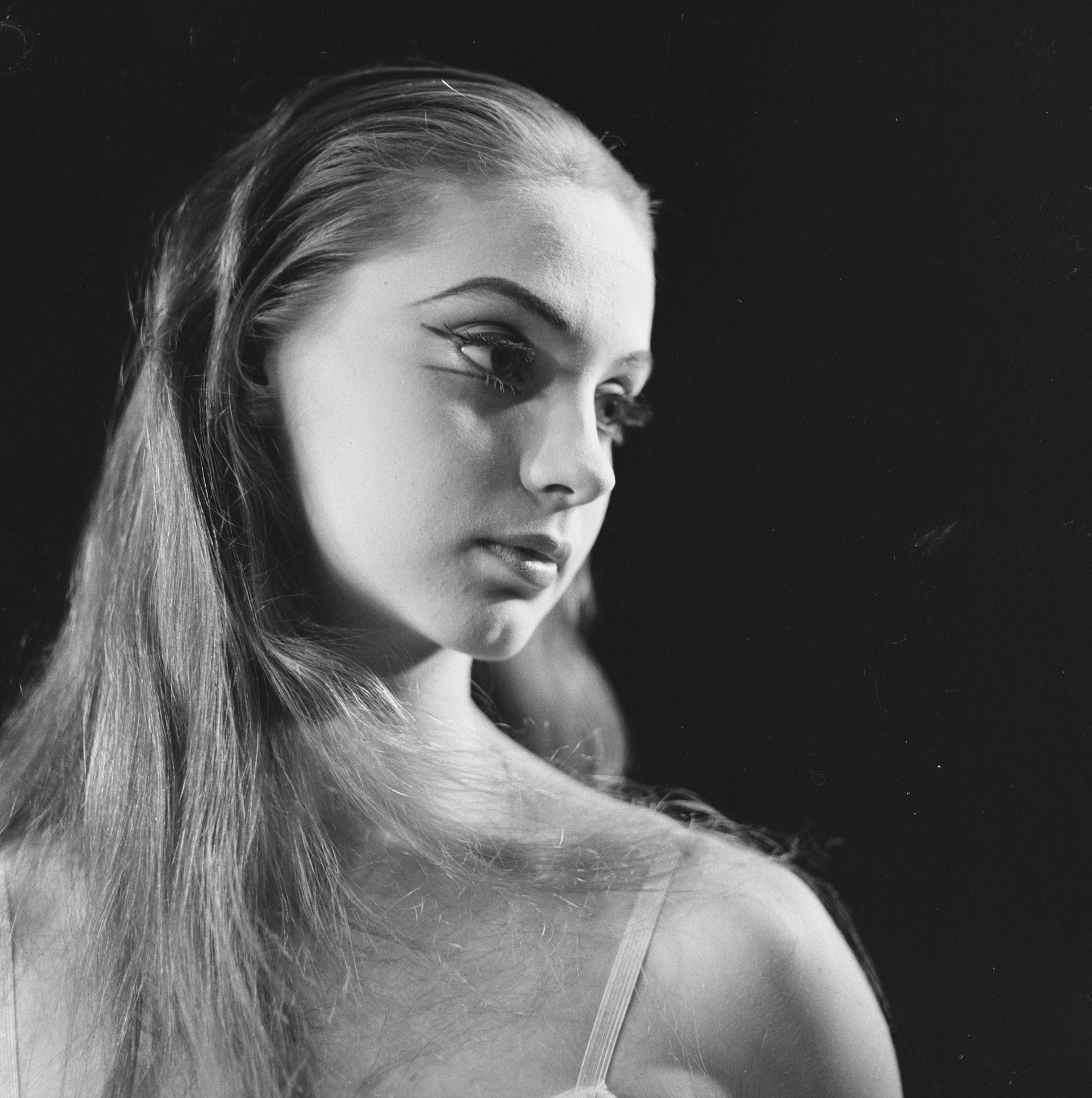
- Farrell in 1965
- Born: Roberta Sue Ficker; August 16, 1945 (age 81); Cincinnati, Ohio, United States
- Education: School of American Ballet
- Occupations: Ballerina; Masterclass Dance Teacher
- Years active: 1960–1989; 1989–2017
- Known for: Dance Career; Dance Guru
- Spouse: Paul Mejia (m. 1969; div. 1997)
- Honours: Kennedy Center Honors (2005); Presidential Medal of Freedom (2005)

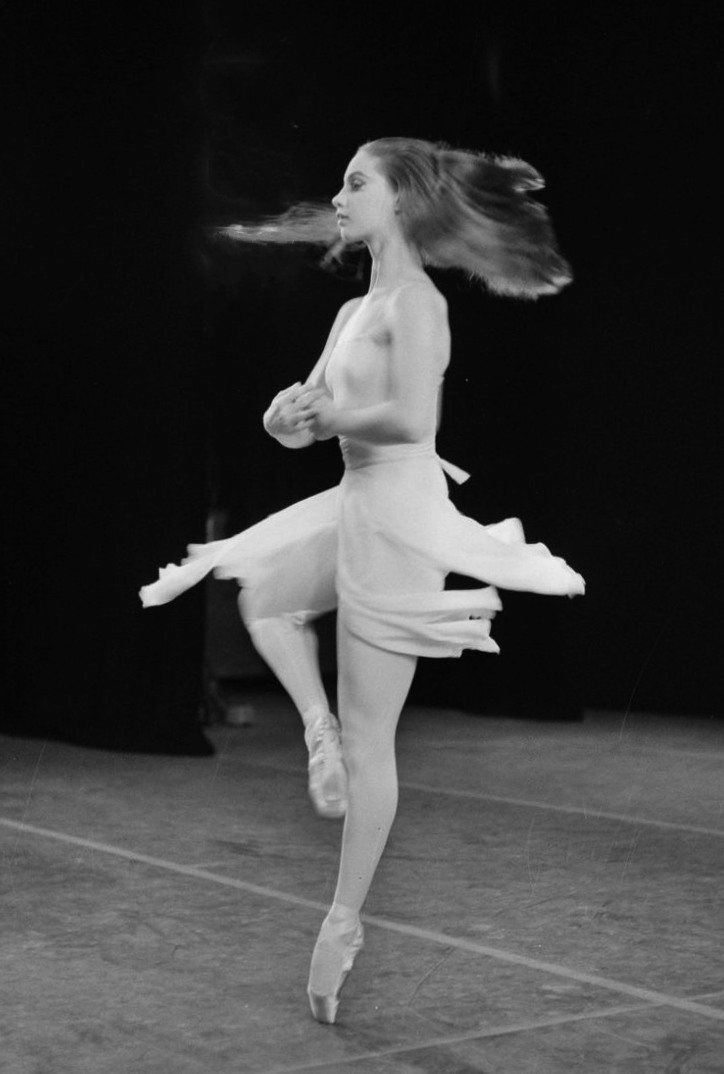
Farrell in 1965

Suzanne Farrell (born August 16, 1945) is a prominent American ballet dancer, teacher and coach, and the founder of Suzanne Farrell Ballet.

Farrell began her ballet training as a child in Cincinnati. In 1960, she received a scholarship to the School of American Ballet. Her first leading roles at New York City Ballet came in the early 1960s, and she became a muse of George Balanchine. She left NYCB in 1969 and moved to Brussels to dance for Maurice Bejart's Ballet of the 20th Century. In 1975, she moved back to the United States, where she collaborated with Balanchine until his death in 1983; she retired from performing six years later after hip surgery due to arthritis. She held a teaching position with NYCB until 1993 and has been a professor of dance at Florida State University since 2000. That same year, she founded her own company, the Suzanne Farrell Ballet, which disbanded at the end of 2017.

Farrell remains a legendary figure in the world of ballet, and in addition to honorary academic degrees has been the recipient of the Kennedy Center Honors and the Presidential Medal of Freedom. She was presented in 1987 with the Golden Plate Award of the American Academy of Achievement at a ceremony in Scottsdale, Arizona. She was also elected to the American Philosophical Society in 2016.

== Early life ==
Farrell was born Roberta Sue Ficker in Cincinnati, Ohio. She received her early training at the Cincinnati Conservatory of Music. In 1960, she was selected to study at the School of American Ballet with a Ford Foundation scholarship. Suzanne, Beverly (the younger of her two older sisters) and their mother moved to the Ansonia apartment-hotel in New York City. In 1961, she joined the New York City Ballet.

== Career ==
=== Early career at NYCB ===
Initially part of the corps de ballet at NYCB, Farrell soon moved on to dancing featured roles. The first ballet choreographed for her was Passage, now Arcade, by John Taras in 1963. Balanchine first paired her with Jacques d'Amboise to choreograph his Meditation, which debuted in December 1963. She re-scaled many ballets and expanded them to a new level of technique. In 1965, she was promoted to principal dancer. Her first role in her new title was Agon with Arthur Mitchell at the Paris Opera. Balanchine quickly fell in love with his "alabaster princess" and created many roles for her. One of the most notable was Dulcinea in Don Quixote, which premiered in May 1965; Balanchine's creation of that ballet was thought to be a valentine to his newest "muse", and Balanchine performed the title role on opening night. In 1968, he cast her as the lead in the "Diamonds" section of his new three-act plotless ballet Jewels. Farrell described learning choreography from Balanchine as a collaborative process. "When Mr. B was working on a ballet, something would just spill out of his body; he could rarely duplicate it, so I tried to see precisely what he wanted the first time."

Balanchine was married at the time to the polio-stricken former ballerina Tanaquil Le Clercq. In 1969, he divorced LeClercq to pursue Farrell, but she married fellow NYCB dancer Paul Mejia instead. This caused the relationship of Farrell and Balanchine to fracture, and Farrell and Mejia left the company. The couple were to remain married until 1997.

Farrell and Mejia joined Maurice Béjart's Brussels-based Ballet of the 20th Century, where Farrell danced leading roles, some created for her, exploring a style of choreography completely different from Balanchine's. During this time, Farrell found herself often paired with the Argentine dancer Jorge Donn. She returned to New York City Ballet in 1975, after which Balanchine resumed creating new ballets for her, including Chaconne, Mozartiana, Tzigane and Robert Schumann's Davidsbündlertänze. She also gave the premiere of Jerome Robbins's In Memory of...

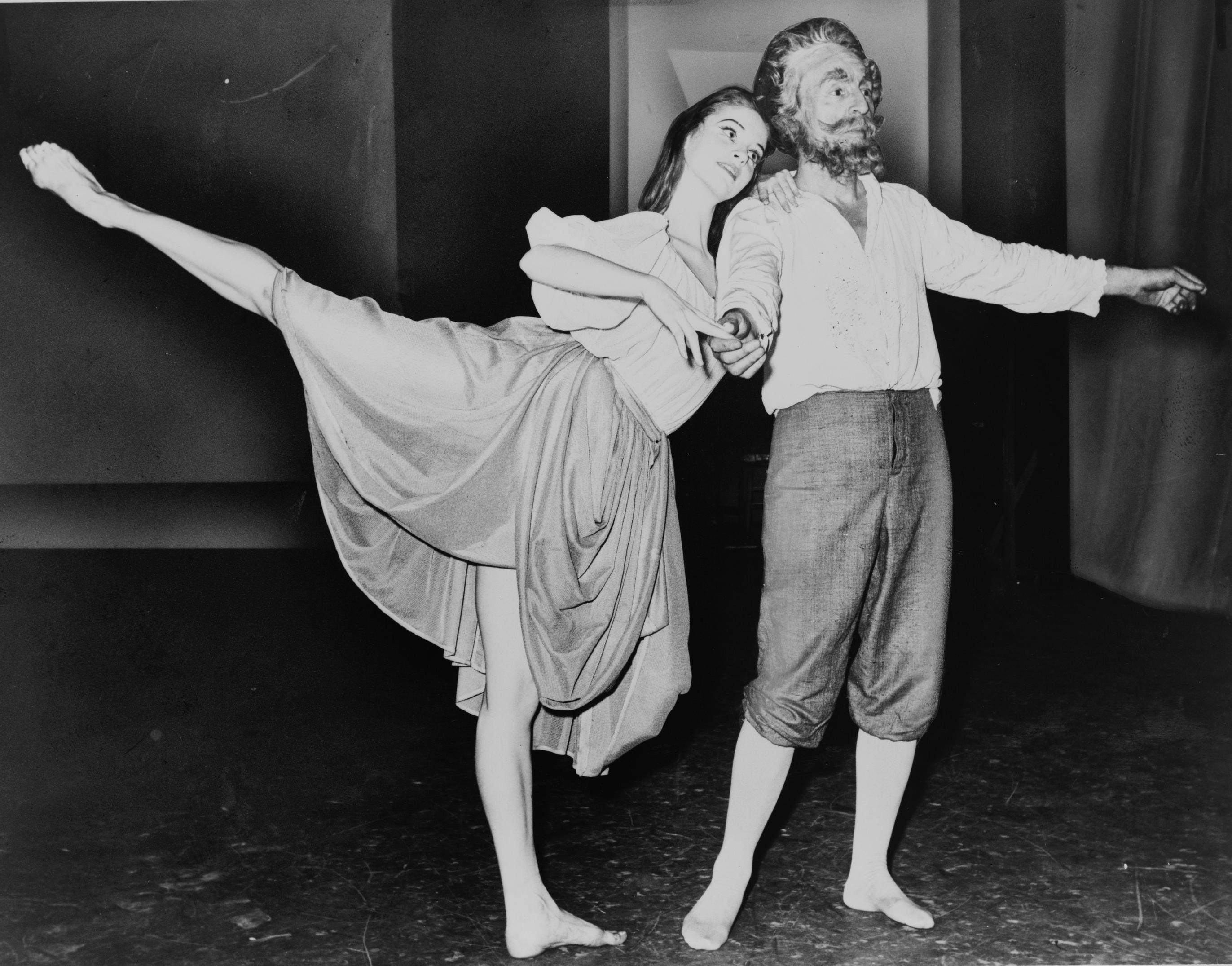
Farrell and George Balanchine in Don Quixote

Farrell's partnership with Balanchine lasted until his death in April 1983; his last works were solos for her. She retired from the New York City Ballet at age 44 on November 26, 1989, after being fired by Martins due to her three-year long absence from the stage, which was caused by her arthritis. She performed Sophisticated Lady and Vienna Waltzes. Farrell gave her final bow at the New York State Theater with New York City Ballet co-founder Lincoln Kirstein by her side.

=== Career as a dance teacher ===
Twenty-eight years of an occupation which takes a tremendous physical toll on the body began to come to an end in 1983. She started to develop arthritis in her right hip and despite two years of varied treatments, by 1985 (at the age of 40), her career on stage was almost over. She struggled for several years but ultimately retired from performing in 1989.

She then moved on to passing on the ballets of Balanchine to the next generation of ballet dancers, working with companies around the world, such as those in Berlin and Vienna, as well as the Paris Opera Ballet, Kirov Ballet and the Bolshoi Ballet. In 1993, New York City Ballet dismissed her from her teaching and coaching position with the company. In 2019, she was invited back, to coach "Diamonds," and she has returned since then to coach Tzigane (renamed Errante), Chaconne, Apollo and Vienna Waltzes.

In 2000, Farrell began teaching in the Dance Department at Florida State University in Tallahassee.

=== Career at the Kennedy Center ===
In 2000, Farrell started her own company, the Suzanne Farrell Ballet, which became a full-fledged company produced by the Kennedy Center but was disbanded in 2017.

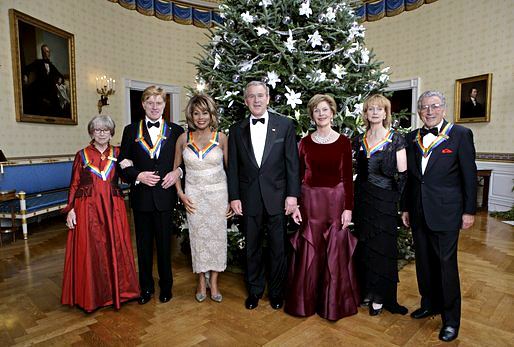
President George W. Bush and Laura Bush pose with the Kennedy Center honorees, from left to right, actress Julie Harris, actor Robert Redford, singer Tina Turner, Farrell, singer Tony Bennett on December 4, 2005, during the reception in the Blue Room at the White House.

Farrell's engagement with the Kennedy Center began in 1993 and 1994, when the Center offered two series of ballet master classes for students with Farrell. This series provided intermediate-to-advanced level ballet students, ages 13 to 17, an opportunity to study with one of the greatest ballerinas of the 20th century. Due to the uniqueness of Farrell's place in the ballet world and the quality of her teaching, the Kennedy Center expanded the program to a national level in 1995, in order to fulfill the center's mission to enhance the arts education of America's young people. Farrell's students learned to "turn up the technicolor in [their] movement", in order to achieve greater amplification in their dancing. This three weeks' long yearly initiative of intense study grew into a full-fledged program, Exploring Ballet with Suzanne Farrell.

In the fall of 1999, Farrell received critical acclaim for the successful Kennedy Center engagement and East Coast tour of Suzanne Farrell Stages the Masters of 20th-century Ballet. Following the Kennedy Center's debut, the newly named Suzanne Farrell Ballet, a group of professional dancers hand selected by Farrell, has since performed at the Kennedy Center during engagements in 2001 and 2002, been on an extensive East Coast tour, and returned to the Kennedy Center as part of the 2003–2004 Ballet Season following a seven-week national tour. Farrell was selected as one of the five recipients of the 2005 Kennedy Center Honors, one of the highest honors for lifetime artistic achievement.

In 2007, the Suzanne Farrell Ballet formalized the creation of the Balanchine Preservation Initiative. This initiative introduces lost or rarely seen Balanchine works to audiences. As a result, ballets like Ragtime (Balanchine/Stravinsky), Pithoprakta (Balanchine/Xenakis) and Divertimento Brillante (Balanchine/Glinka) were recreated and performed.

Despite positive reviews and an annual budget ranging from $1–$1.4 million, the center announced in September 2016 that the company would be disbanding at the end of the 2017 performance season. Deborah Rutter, President of the John F. Kennedy Center for the Performing Arts, noted that the center would be undergoing a new expansion project to include additional performance and rehearsal space. Farrell's new role in the organization remained unclear, however, Rutter emphasized that Farrell would continue to be an "artistic partner" at the center.

== Film and video ==
Early in her career, Farrell's performances of Concerto Barocco and A Midsummer Night's Dream were captured on camera. Several of Farrell's assumptions of Balanchine roles were filmed during the 1970s for PBS's Dance in America. She can also be seen dancing an excerpt from Tchaikovsky Pas de Deux in the 1977 feature movie The Turning Point, and she appeared in the 1979–1980 season of Sesame Street.

== Autobiography ==
Holding on to the Air: An Autobiography, co-written by Farrell with Toni Bentley, was published in 1990, and reissued with a new preface by Farrell in 2002.

== See also ==
- Women in dance

== Further reading and viewing ==
- Suzanne Farrell, Toni Bentley, Holding on to the Air (Summit Books, New York, 1990)
- Suzanne Farrell: Elusive Muse, 1996 documentary film
- "Suzanne Farrell Biography and Interview". www.achievement.org. American Academy of Achievement.
