= Michele Wiles =

American ballet dancer

- Born: Baltimore, Maryland
- Education: Kirov Academy of Ballet in Washington D.C. (1991–1997); The Joffrey Ballet and The Royal Ballet (summer programs); American Ballet Theatre's Studio Company (1997)
- Known for: Ballet
- Awards: Gold Medal, 18th International Ballet Competition in Varna; Bronze Medal, Nagoya, Japan; Finalist, Paris International Dance Competition; Princess Grace Foundation – U.S.A. Dance Fellowship (1999–2000); Erik Bruhn Prize (2000)

Michele Wiles is an American ballet dancer. She was a principal dancer with American Ballet Theatre from 2005 - 2011. In 2011, she left ABT to form the independent classical ballet company Ballet Next with former New York City Ballet principal dancer Charles Askegard.

== Biography ==
Wiles was born May 7, 1980. She began studying ballet in Washington, D.C. where, at the age of ten, she received a full scholarship to the Kirov Academy of Ballet. She studied at the Kirov from 1991 to 1997, during which time she also participated in summer programs at the Joffrey Ballet and The Royal Ballet. Michele joined American Ballet Theatre's Studio Company in 1997.

In 1996, Michele was a Gold Medal winner at the 18th International Ballet Competition in Varna, a Bronze Medal winner in Nagoya, Japan and a finalist at the Paris International Dance Competition. She was a Princess Grace Foundation – U.S.A. Dance Fellowship recipient for 1999–2000 and won the Erik Bruhn Prize in 2002. (See also: Erik Bruhn)

Michele joined American Ballet Theatre in 1998. She became a Soloist in 2000 and was promoted to Principal Dancer in 2005. She created leading roles in Concerto No. 1 for Piano and Orchestra, Gong and Within You Without You: A Tribute to George Harrison.

== Ballet Next ==
Wiles and Charles Askegard founded the Ballet Next company which had its premiere at the Joyce Theater on Monday, November 21, 2011.
