= Natalia Kasatkina =

Russian ballerina and choreographer (1934–2024)

- Наталия Касаткина
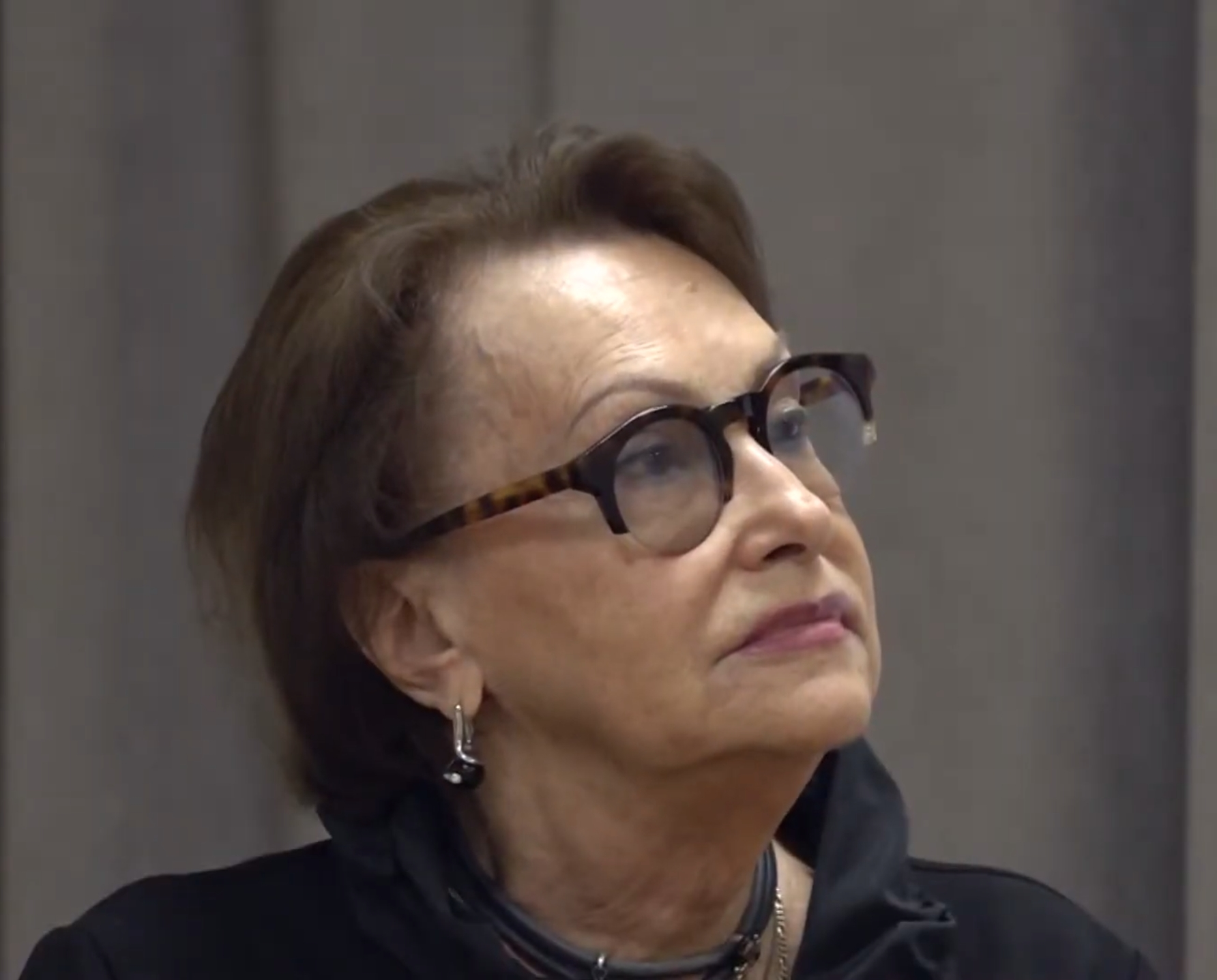
- Kasatkina in 2019
- Born: Natalia Dmitrievna Kasatkina; 7 June 1934; Moscow, Russian SFSR, USSR
- Died: 13 March 2024 (aged 89); Moscow, Russia
- Education: Moscow State Academy of Choreography
- Occupations: Ballerina; Choreographer

Natalia Dmitrievna Kasatkina (Russian: Ната́лия Дми́триевна Каса́ткина; 7 June 1934 – 13 March 2024) was a Russian ballerina and choreographer.

Kasatkina performed at the Bolshoi Theatre from 1954 to 1976 and directed the Kasatkina and Vasilyev Classical Ballet Theatre from 1977 until her death alongside her husband, Vladimir Vasilyov. She was named a People's Artist of the RSFSR in 1984.

== Biography ==
Born in Moscow on 7 June 1934, Kasatkina was the daughter of engineer Dmitri Kasatkina and children's author Anna Kardachova. She graduated from the Moscow State Academy of Choreography as a student of Sulamith Messerer. As a solo dancer for the Bolshoi Theatre, she performed scores such as Swan Lake, Raymonda, Cinderella, Don Quixote, The Rite of Spring, and Carmen Suite. She also had performances at the Kirov Theatre in Leningrad.

Natalia Kasatkina died from a blood clot in Moscow on 13 March 2024, at the age of 89.

== Awards ==
- Honored Artist of the RSFSR (1966)
- USSR State Prize (1976)
- Order of the Red Banner of Labour (1976)
- People's Artist of the RSFSR (1984)
- Order of Friendship of Peoples (1994)
- Order of Honour (2005)
- Gratitude from the Ministry of Culture (2006)
- Order of Friendship (2020)
