= Philadelphia Ballet =

American non-profit organization

The Philadelphia Ballet

General information
- Name: The Philadelphia Ballet
- Year founded: 1963
- Founders: Barbara Weisberger
- Principal venue: Academy of Music Philadelphia, Pennsylvania; Miller Theater, Philadelphia, Pennsylvania
- Website: www.philadelphiaballet.org

Artistic staff
- Artistic director: Ángel Corella
- Ballet master: Charles Askegard, Samantha Dunster
- Music director: Beatrice Jona Affron

Other
- Orchestra: The Philadelphia Ballet Orchestra
- Official school: School of Philadelphia Ballet
- Formation: Principal Dancer; Soloist; Corps de Ballet

Philadelphia Ballet (formerly known as Pennsylvania Ballet until its rebranding in 2021) is the largest ballet company in Philadelphia. The company's annual local season features six programs of classic pieces, such as George Balanchine's The Nutcracker, in addition to presentations of new works. The company's artistic director is Angel Corella.

== Company history ==
Pennsylvania Ballet was established in 1963 by Barbara Weisberger, a protégée of George Balanchine, through a Ford Foundation initiative to develop regional professional dance companies. The company is considered a cultural institution and is noted for its focus on the Balanchine repertoire.

The company performed nationally for the first time in 1968 at the New York City Center, which led to a decade of national touring, appearances on PBS's Dance in America series, and a stint as the official company of the Brooklyn Academy of Music during the 1970s.

In 1982, Pennsylvania Ballet became the first major American ballet company to promote an African-American woman, Debra Austin, to principal dancer. Between 1987 and 1989, Pennsylvania Ballet forged an alliance with Milwaukee Ballet to create one company. The new organization had 43 dancers, and was the first in the country to offer its dancers year-round employment.

In 1995, Roy Kaiser was appointed as artistic director by the trustees of Pennsylvania Ballet. Kaiser was a former principal dancer and had been hired as a company member in 1979 by Weisberger. Following his retirement from the stage in 1992, Kaiser served as principal ballet master and associate artistic director under Christopher d'Amboise before being named to his current position.

Under Kaiser's leadership, the company expanded its Balanchine-based repertoire to include new works from both established and emerging choreographers. New works included premieres of original ballets from choreographers Merce Cunningham, Christopher d'Amboise, Trey McIntyre, Matthew Neenan, David Parsons, Val Caniparoli, Benjamin Millepied, and Christopher Wheeldon, as well as the 40th-anniversary commission of Swan Lake by Christopher Wheeldon and the 2007 world premiere of Matthew Neenan's Carmina Burana. Pennsylvania Ballet currently employs 37 dancers and annually presents a season of six programs, which includes their annual signature production of Balanchine's The Nutcracker. The season combines classic ballets with new works and challenges the dancers while attracting a diverse audience. The company also tours throughout Pennsylvania and elsewhere, including venues such as New York City Center and the John F. Kennedy Center for the Performing Arts in Washington DC. Pennsylvania Ballet made its international debut at the Edinburgh International Festival in August 2005.

Fourteen members of the Pennsylvania Ballet appeared as the corps in the 2010 film Black Swan. In September 2014, Ángel Corella was named artistic director.

In July 2021, Pennsylvania Ballet rebranded and became the Philadelphia Ballet. The Philadelphia Ballet II (the company's second company) provides outreach and educational performances.

Matthew Neenan, Philadelphia Ballet's first choreographer in residence, danced for the company from 1994 to 2007.

== Outreach programs ==
Philadelphia Ballet has increased its reach through creative programming initiatives such as the Family Matinee Series, the Prologue Lecture Series, and its outreach and education program, Accent on Dance, which serves over 11,000 children each year. Philadelphia Ballet II performs around 25 shows in the Philadelphia area as well as arranging studio tours, school shows, and free tickets to Main Stage performances.

== Artistic staff ==
- Artistic Director: Ángel Corella
- Assistant Director: Samantha Dunster
- Ballet Masters: Charles Askegard
- Choreographer in Residence: Juliano Nunes

== 2025-2026 Dancers ==
The company dancers of the Philadelphia Ballet are:

=== Principals ===
- Sterling Baca
- Sydney Dolan
- Thays Golz
- Yuka Iseda
- Zecheng Liang
- Nayara Lopes
- Oksana Maslova
- Mayara Pineiro
- Ashton Roxander
- So Jung Shin
- Arian Molina Soca
- Pau Pujol
- Jack Thomas
- Dayesi Torriente

=== First soloists ===
- Lucia Erickson
- Isaac Hollis

=== Soloists ===
- Jacqueline Callahan
- Jorge Garcia Alonso
- Alexandra Heier
- Mine Kusano
- Gabriela Mesa
- Nicholas Patterson

=== Demi soloists ===
- Federico D'Ortenzi
- Russell Ducker
- Javier Rivet
- Jack Sprance

=== Corps de ballet ===
- Giovanna Assis Genovez
- Charlie Clinton
- Ava DiEmedio
- Isabella DiEmedio
- Charlotte Erickson
- Scarlett Güémez
- Siobhan Howy
- Kyleigh Johnson
- Ashley Lewis
- Gabriele Lukasik
- Denis Maciel
- Juan Montobbio Maestre
- Mayfield Myers
- Cory Ogdahl
- Natalie Patel
- Erin Patterson
- Sophie Savas-Carstens
- Anna Serratosa
- Emily Wilson

=== Apprentices ===
- Petra Johnson
- Victoria Lorenzo

=== Philadelphia Ballet II ===
Philadelphia Ballet II (formerly Pennsylvania Ballet II) was created in 2002 by Joyce and Herbert Kean as a second company. The dancers in this program frequently practice with the main company and are used as dancers in the larger productions. Philadelphia Ballet II also is involved with many outreach and educational programs.

- Molly Allen
- Ivy Bancoff
- Nikolas Button
- Aiden Coulter
- Olivia DiEmedeo
- Maria Dominguez
- Valeria Franco
- Berkleigh Hernandez
- Kaden Pfister
- Gabriel Saad
- Christopher Tsukada
- Madeline Winters

== Historical Company Members ==
Season	Category	Dancer Name
2025-2026	Principal Dancer	Sterling Baca
2025-2026	Principal Dancer	Sydney Dolan
2025-2026	Principal Dancer	Yuka Iseda
2025-2026	Principal Dancer	Zecheng Liang
2025-2026	Principal Dancer	Nayara Lopes
2025-2026	Principal Dancer	Oksana Maslova
2025-2026	Principal Dancer	Mayara Pineiro
2025-2026	Principal Dancer	Ashton Roxander
2025-2026	Principal Dancer	So Jung Shin
2025-2026	Principal Dancer	Arian Molina Soca
2025-2026	Principal Dancer	Jack Thomas
2025-2026	Principal Dancer	Dayesi Torriente
2025-2026	Principal Dancer	Sydney Dolan
2025-2026	First Soloist	Austin Eyler
2025-2026	First Soloist	Thaya Golz
2025-2026	First Soloist	Pau Pujol
2025-2026	Soloist	Jacqueline Callahan
2025-2026	Soloist	Lucia Erickson
2025-2026	Soloist	Alexandra Heier
2025-2026	Soloist	Isaac Hollis
2025-2026	Soloist	Nicholas Patterson
2025-2026	Demi-Soloist	Yuval Cohen
2025-2026	Demi-Soloist	Federico D'Ortenzi
2025-2026	Demi-Soloist	Russel Ducker
2025-2026	Demi-Soloist	Mine Kusano
2025-2026	Demi-Soloist	Gabriela Mesa
2025-2026	Demi-Soloist	Jack Sprance
2025-2026	Corps de Ballet	Giovanna Assis Genovez
2025-2026	Corps de Ballet	Charlie Clinton
2025-2026	Corps de Ballet	Isabella DiEmedio
2025-2026	Corps de Ballet	Charlotte Erickson
2025-2026	Corps de Ballet	Jorge Garcia Alonso
2025-2026	Corps de Ballet	Scarlett Güémez
2025-2026	Corps de Ballet	Siobhan Howley
2025-2026	Corps de Ballet	Kyleigh Johnson
2025-2026	Corps de Ballet	Ashley Lewis
2025-2026	Corps de Ballet	Gabriele Lukasik
2025-2026	Corps de Ballet	Denis Maciel
2025-2026	Corps de Ballet	Juan Montobbio Maestre
2025-2026	Corps de Ballet	Mayfield Myers
2025-2026	Corps de Ballet	Cory Ogdahl
2025-2026	Corps de Ballet	Natalie Patel
2025-2026	Corps de Ballet	Erin Patterson
2025-2026	Corps de Ballet	Javier Rivet
2025-2026	Corps de Ballet	Sophie Savas-Carstens
2025-2026	Corps de Ballet	Anna Serratosa
2025-2026	Corps de Ballet	Emily Wilson
2025-2026	Apprentices	Ava DiEmedio
2025-2026	Apprentices	Petra Johnson
2025-2026	Apprentices	Victoria Lorenzo
2025-2026	Apprentices	Gavin Nicholson
2025-2026	PBII	Molly Allen
2025-2026	PBII	Ivy Bancoff
2025-2026	PBII	Nikolas Button
2025-2026	PBII	Aiden Coulter
2025-2026	PBII	Olivia DiEmedio
2025-2026	PBII	Mariana Dominguez
2025-2026	PBII	Valeria Franco
2025-2026	PBII	Berkleigh Hernandez
2025-2026	PBII	Kaden Pfister
2025-2026	PBII	Gabriel Saad
2025-2026	PBII	Christopher Tsukada
2025-2026	PBII	Madeline Winters
2024-2025	Principal Dancer	Sterling Baca
2024-2025	Principal Dancer	Sydney Dolan
2024-2025	Principal Dancer	Yuka Iseda
2024-2025	Principal Dancer	Zecheng Liang
2024-2025	Principal Dancer	Nayara Lopes
2024-2025	Principal Dancer	Oksana Maslova
2024-2025	Principal Dancer	Mayara Pineiro
2024-2025	Principal Dancer	Ashton Roxander
2024-2025	Principal Dancer	Arian Molina Soca
2024-2025	Principal Dancer	Jack Thomas
2024-2025	Principal Dancer	Dayesi Torriente
2024-2025	First Soloist	Pau Pujol
2024-2025	First Soloist	So Jung Shin
2024-2025	Soloist	Jacqueline Callahan
2024-2025	Soloist	Lucia Erickson
2024-2025	Soloist	Austin Eyler
2024-2025	Soloist	Alexandra Heier
2024-2025	Soloist	Thays Golz
2024-2025	Soloist	Isaac Hollis
2024-2025	Soloist	Nicholas Patterson
2024-2025	Demi-Soloist	Yuval Cohen
2024-2025	Demi-Soloist	Russel Ducker
2024-2025	Demi-Soloist	Mine Kusano
2024-2025	Demi-Soloist	Gabriela Mesa
2024-2025	Demi-Soloist	Jack Sprance
2024-2025	Corps de Ballet	Giovanna Assis Genovez
2024-2025	Corps de Ballet	Charlie Clinton
2024-2025	Corps de Ballet	Isabella DiEmedio
2024-2025	Corps de Ballet	Federico D’Ortenzi
2024-2025	Corps de Ballet	Charlotte Erickson
2024-2025	Corps de Ballet	Jorge Garcia Alonso
2024-2025	Corps de Ballet	Scarlett Güémez
2024-2025	Corps de Ballet	Siobhan Howley
2024-2025	Corps de Ballet	Ashley Lewis
2024-2025	Corps de Ballet	Gabriele Lukasik
2024-2025	Corps de Ballet	Denis Maciel
2024-2025	Corps de Ballet	Juan Montobbio Maestre
2024-2025	Corps de Ballet	Mayfield Myers
2024-2025	Corps de Ballet	Cory Ogdahl
2024-2025	Corps de Ballet	Erin Patterson
2024-2025	Corps de Ballet	Javier Rivet
2024-2025	Corps de Ballet	Sophie Savas-Carstens
2024-2025	Corps de Ballet	Anna Serratosa
2024-2025	Corps de Ballet	Julia Vinez
2024-2025	Corps de Ballet	Emily Wilson
2024-2025	Apprentices	Katie Cerny
2024-2025	Apprentices	Kyleigh Johnson
2024-2025	Apprentices	Natalie Patel
2024-2025	PBII	Nikolas Button
2024-2025	PBII	Soren Campagna
2024-2025	PBII	Ava DiEmedio
2024-2025	PBII	Patrick “Liev” Ewart
2024-2025	PBII	Berkleigh Hernandez
2024-2025	PBII	Petra Johnson
2024-2025	PBII	Olivia Neill
2024-2025	PBII	Gavin Nicholson
2024-2025	PBII	Noah Seidl
2024-2025	PBII	Jason Shuman
2024-2025	PBII	Madeline Winters
2023-2024	Principal Dancer	Sterling Baca
2023-2024	Principal Dancer	Yuka Iseda
2023-2024	Principal Dancer	Zecheng Liang
2023-2024	Principal Dancer	Nayara Lopes
2023-2024	Principal Dancer	Oksana Maslova
2023-2024	Principal Dancer	Arian Molina Soca
2023-2024	Principal Dancer	Mayara Pineiro
2023-2024	Principal Dancer	Ashton Roxander
2023-2024	Principal Dancer	Jack Thomas
2023-2024	Principal Dancer	Dayesi Torriente
2023-2024	First Soloist	Sydney Dolan
2023-2024	Soloist	Austin Eyler
2023-2024	Soloist	Thays Golz
2023-2024	Soloist	Alexandra Heier
2023-2024	Soloist	Kathryn Manger
2023-2024	Soloist	So Jung Shin
2023-2024	Soloist	Pau Pujol
2023-2024	Demi-Soloist	Jacqueline Callahan
2023-2024	Demi-Soloist	Russell Ducker
2023-2024	Demi-Soloist	Lucia Erickson
2023-2024	Demi-Soloist	Isaac Hollis
2023-2024	Demi-Soloist	Gabriela Mesa
2023-2024	Demi-Soloist	Nicholas Patterson
2023-2024	Demi-Soloist	Jack Sprance
2023-2024	Corps de Ballet	Charlie Clinton
2023-2024	Corps de Ballet	Yuval Cohen
2023-2024	Corps de Ballet	Isabella DiEmedio
2023-2024	Corps de Ballet	Federico D’Ortenzi
2023-2024	Corps de Ballet	Scarlett Güémez
2023-2024	Corps de Ballet	Siobhan Howley
2023-2024	Corps de Ballet	Mine Kusano
2023-2024	Corps de Ballet	Denis Maciel
2023-2024	Corps de Ballet	Mayfield Myers
2023-2024	Corps de Ballet	Cory Ogdahl
2023-2024	Corps de Ballet	Fernanda Oliveira
2023-2024	Corps de Ballet	Erin Patterson
2023-2024	Corps de Ballet	Javier Rivet
2023-2024	Corps de Ballet	Sophie Savas-Carstens
2023-2024	Corps de Ballet	Anna Serratosa
2023-2024	Corps de Ballet	Julia Vinez
2023-2024	Corps de Ballet	Emily Wilson
2023-2024	Apprentices	Giovanna Assis Genovez
2023-2024	Apprentices	Jorge Garcia Alonso
2023-2024	Apprentices	Charlotte Erickson
2023-2024	Apprentices	Ashley Lewis
2023-2024	Apprentices	Gabriele Lukasik
2023-2024	Apprentices	Juan Montobbio Maestre
2023-2024	PBII	Roman Aldrete
2023-2024	PBII	Soren Campagna
2023-2024	PBII	Katie Cerny
2023-2024	PBII	Ava Diemedio
2023-2024	PBII	Kyleigh Johnson
2023-2024	PBII	Olivia Neill
2023-2024	PBII	Natalie Patel
2023-2024	PBII	Noah Seidl
2023-2024	PBII	Jason Shuman
2023-2024	PBII	Audrey Tovar-Dunster
2022-2023	Principal Dancer	Sterling Baca
2022-2023	Principal Dancer	Yuka Iseda
2022-2023	Principal Dancer	Zecheng Liang
2022-2023	Principal Dancer	Nayara Lopes
2022-2023	Principal Dancer	Oksana Maslova
2022-2023	Principal Dancer	Arian Molina Soca
2022-2023	Principal Dancer	Mayara Pineiro
2022-2023	Principal Dancer	Jack Thomas
2022-2023	Principal Dancer	Dayesi Torriente
2022-2023	First Soloist	Sydney Dolan
2022-2023	First Soloist	Ashton Roxander
2022-2023	Soloist	Austin Eyler
2022-2023	Soloist	Thays Golz
2022-2023	Soloist	Alexandra Heier
2022-2023	Soloist	Kathryn Manger
2022-2023	Soloist	So Jung Shin
2022-2023	Soloist	Pau Pujol
2022-2023	Soloist	Peter Weil
2022-2023	Demi-Soloist	Jacqueline Callahan
2022-2023	Demi-Soloist	Russell Ducker
2022-2023	Demi-Soloist	Lucia Erickson
2022-2023	Demi-Soloist	Isaac Hollis
2022-2023	Demi-Soloist	Gabriela Mesa
2022-2023	Demi-Soloist	Nicholas Patterson
2022-2023	Demi-Soloist	Jack Sprance
2022-2023	Corps de Ballet	Adrianna De Svastich
2022-2023	Corps de Ballet	Isabella DiEmedio
2022-2023	Corps de Ballet	Federico D’Ortenzi
2022-2023	Corps de Ballet	Scarlett Güémez
2022-2023	Corps de Ballet	Siobhan Howley
2022-2023	Corps de Ballet	Mine Kusano
2022-2023	Corps de Ballet	Denis Maciel
2022-2023	Corps de Ballet	Mayfield Myers
2022-2023	Corps de Ballet	Cory Ogdahl
2022-2023	Corps de Ballet	Fernanda Oliveira
2022-2023	Corps de Ballet	Erin O'dea Patterson
2022-2023	Corps de Ballet	Javier Rivet
2022-2023	Corps de Ballet	Sophie Savas-Carstens
2022-2023	Corps de Ballet	Anna Serratosa
2022-2023	Corps de Ballet	Paloma Berjano-Torrado
2022-2023	Corps de Ballet	Julia Vinez
2022-2023	Corps de Ballet	Emily Wilson
2022-2023	Apprentices	Giovanna Assis Genovez
2022-2023	Apprentices	Charlie Clinton
2022-2023	Apprentices	Yuval Cohen
2022-2023	Apprentices	Vinicius Ferreira Freire
2022-2023	Apprentices	Jorge Garcia Alonso
2022-2023	Apprentices	Ashley Lewis
2022-2023	Apprentices	Gabriele Lukasik
2022-2023	Apprentices	Juan Montobbio Maestre
2022-2023	PBII	Roman Aldrete
2022-2023	PBII	Charlotte Erickson
2022-2023	PBII	Jose Luis Pechene
2021-2022	Principal Dancer	Sterling Baca
2021-2022	Principal Dancer	Jermel Johnson
2021-2022	Principal Dancer	Zecheng Liang
2021-2022	Principal Dancer	Oksana Maslova
2021-2022	Principal Dancer	Arian Molina Soca
2021-2022	Principal Dancer	Mayara Pineiro
2021-2022	Principal Dancer	Dayesi Torriente
2021-2022	First Soloist	Yuka Iseda
2021-2022	First Soloist	Nyara Lopes
2021-2022	First Soloist	Jack Thomas
2021-2022	Soloist	Aleksey Babayev
2021-2022	Soloist	Sydney Dolan
2021-2022	Soloist	Thays Golz
2021-2022	Soloist	Kathryn Manger
2021-2022	Soloist	Ashton Roxander
2021-2022	Soloist	Peter Weil
2021-2022	Demi-Soloist	Etienne Diaz
2021-2022	Demi-Soloist	Russell Ducker
2021-2022	Demi-Soloist	Lucia Erickson
2021-2022	Demi-Soloist	Alexandra Heier
2021-2022	Demi-Soloist	So Jung Shin
2021-2022	Demi-Soloist	Jack Sprance
2021-2022	Corps de Ballet	Cato Berry
2021-2022	Corps de Ballet	Jacqueline Callahan
2021-2022	Corps de Ballet	Adrianna De Svastich
2021-2022	Corps de Ballet	Federico D’Ortenzi
2021-2022	Corps de Ballet	Austin Eyler
2021-2022	Corps de Ballet	Marjorie Feiring
2021-2022	Corps de Ballet	Siobhan Howley
2021-2022	Corps de Ballet	Denis Maciel
2021-2022	Corps de Ballet	Gabriela Mesa
2021-2022	Corps de Ballet	Erin O'Dea
2021-2022	Corps de Ballet	Fernanda Oliveira
2021-2022	Corps de Ballet	Nicholas Patterson
2021-2022	Corps de Ballet	Javier Rivet
2021-2022	Corps de Ballet	Pau Pujol
2021-2022	Corps de Ballet	Sophie Savas-Carstens
2021-2022	Corps de Ballet	Julia Vinez
2021-2022	Apprentice	Isaac Hollis
2021-2022	Apprentice	Mine Kusano
2021-2022	Apprentice	Cory Ogdahl
2021-2022	Apprentice	Jeremy Power
2021-2022	Apprentice	Paloma Berjano Torrado
2021-2022	Apprentice	Emily Wilson
2021-2022	PBII	Charlie Clinton
2021-2022	PBII	Isabella DiEmedio
2021-2022	PBII	Corinne Mulcahy
2021-2022	PBII	Victoria Casals Renzetti
2021-2022	PBII	Ben Schwarz
2020-2021	Principal Dancer	Sterling Baca
2020-2021	Principal Dancer	Lillian DiPiazza
2020-2021	Principal Dancer	Jermel Johnson
2020-2021	Principal Dancer	Zecheng Liang
2020-2021	Principal Dancer	Oksana Maslova
2020-2021	Principal Dancer	Arian Molina Soca
2020-2021	Principal Dancer	Mayara Pineiro
2020-2021	Principal Dancer	Dayesi Torriente
2020-2021	First Soloist	Yuka Iseda
2020-2021	First Soloist	Nyara Lopes
2020-2021	First Soloist	Jack Thomas
2020-2021	Soloist	Aleksey Babayev
2020-2021	Soloist	Sydney Dolan
2020-2021	Soloist	Thays Golz
2020-2021	Soloist	Kathryn Manger
2020-2021	Soloist	Ashton Roxander
2020-2021	Soloist	Peter Weil
2020-2021	Demi-Soloist	Etienne Diaz
2020-2021	Demi-Soloist	Russell Ducker
2020-2021	Demi-Soloist	Lucia Erickson
2020-2021	Demi-Soloist	Alexandra Heier
2020-2021	Demi-Soloist	So Jung Shin
2020-2021	Demi-Soloist	Jack Sprance
2020-2021	Corps de Ballet	Cato Berry
2020-2021	Corps de Ballet	Jacqueline Callahan
2020-2021	Corps de Ballet	Emily Davis
2020-2021	Corps de Ballet	Adrianna De Svastich
2020-2021	Corps de Ballet	Federico D’Ortenzi
2020-2021	Corps de Ballet	Austin Eyler
2020-2021	Corps de Ballet	Marjorie Feiring
2020-2021	Corps de Ballet	Siobhan Howley
2020-2021	Corps de Ballet	Denis Maciel
2020-2021	Corps de Ballet	Gabriela Mesa
2020-2021	Corps de Ballet	Erin O'Dea
2020-2021	Corps de Ballet	Fernanda Oliveira
2020-2021	Corps de Ballet	Nicholas Patterson
2020-2021	Corps de Ballet	Pau Pujol
2020-2021	Corps de Ballet	Sophie Savas-Carstens
2020-2021	Corps de Ballet	Julia-Rose Sherrill
2020-2021	Corps de Ballet	Julia Vinez
2020-2021	Apprentice	Isaac Hollis
2020-2021	Apprentice	Mine Kusano
2020-2021	Apprentice	Cory Ogdahl
2020-2021	Apprentice	Jeremy Power
2020-2021	Apprentice	Paloma Berjano Torrado
2020-2021	Apprentice	Emily Wilson
2020-2021	PBII	Charlie Clinton
2020-2021	PBII	Isabella DiEmedio
2020-2021	PBII	Grace Hill
2020-2021	PBII	Garritt McCabe
2020-2021	PBII	Corinne Mulcahy
2020-2021	PBII	Victoria Casals Renzetti
2020-2021	PBII	Ben Schwarz
2019-2020	Principal Dancer	Sterling Baca
2019-2020	Principal Dancer	Lillian DiPiazza
2019-2020	Principal Dancer	Jermel Johnson
2019-2020	Principal Dancer	Zecheng Liang
2019-2020	Principal Dancer	Oksana Maslova
2019-2020	Principal Dancer	Arian Molina Soca
2019-2020	Principal Dancer	Mayara Pineiro
2019-2020	Principal Dancer	Dayesi Torriente
2019-2020	First Soloist	Yuka Iseda
2019-2020	First Soloist	Albert Gordon
2019-2020	First Soloist	Nayara Lopes
2019-2020	Soloist	Aleksey Babayev
2019-2020	Soloist	Sydney Dolan
2019-2020	Soloist	Alexandra Hughes
2019-2020	Soloist	Kathryn Manger
2019-2020	Soloist	Ashton Roxander
2019-2020	Soloist	Jack Thomas
2019-2020	Soloist	Peter Weil
2019-2020	Demi-Soloist	Etienne Diaz
2019-2020	Demi-Soloist	Russell Ducker
2019-2020	Demi-Soloist	Thays Golz
2019-2020	Demi-Soloist	Alexandra Heier
2019-2020	Demi-Soloist	So Jung Shin
2019-2020	Corps de Ballet	Aaron Anker
2019-2020	Corps de Ballet	Cato Berry
2019-2020	Corps de Ballet	Jacqueline Callahan
2019-2020	Corps de Ballet	Emily Davis
2019-2020	Corps de Ballet	Adrianna De Svastich
2019-2020	Corps de Ballet	Federico D’Ortenzi
2019-2020	Corps de Ballet	Lucia Erickson
2019-2020	Corps de Ballet	Austin Eyler
2019-2020	Corps de Ballet	Marjorie Feiring
2019-2020	Corps de Ballet	Siobhan Howley
2019-2020	Corps de Ballet	Cassidy McAndrew
2019-2020	Corps de Ballet	Gabriela Mesa
2019-2020	Corps de Ballet	Erin O'Dea
2019-2020	Corps de Ballet	Nicholas Patterson
2019-2020	Corps de Ballet	Pau Pujol
2019-2020	Corps de Ballet	Julia-Rose Sherrill
2019-2020	Corps de Ballet	Jack Sprance
2019-2020	Corps de Ballet	Julia Vinez
2019-2020	Apprentice	Denis Maciel
2019-2020	Apprentice	Flavia Morante
2019-2020	Apprentice	Cory Ogdahl
2019-2020	Apprentice	Santiago Paniagua
2019-2020	Apprentice	Sophie Savas-Carstens
2019-2020	PBII	Paloma Berjano Torrado
2019-2020	PBII	Victoria Casals Renzetti
2019-2020	PBII	Arnaldo Hernandez
2019-2020	PBII	Grace Hill
2019-2020	PBII	Mine Kusano
2019-2020	PBII	Jordan Martinez
2019-2020	PBII	Garritt McCabe
2019-2020	PBII	Jeremy Power
2019-2020	PBII	Jake Roxander
2019-2020	PBII	Emily Wilson
2018-2019	Principal Dancer	Sterling Baca
2018-2019	Principal Dancer	Lillian DiPiazza
2018-2019	Principal Dancer	Ian Hussey
2018-2019	Principal Dancer	Jermel Johnson
2018-2019	Principal Dancer	Oksana Maslova
2018-2019	Principal Dancer	Arian Molina Soca
2018-2019	Principal Dancer	Mayara Pineiro
2018-2019	Principal Dancer	Dayesi Torriente
2019-2020	Soloist	Aleksey Babayev
2018-2019	Soloist	Ana Calderon
2018-2019	Soloist	Albert Gordon
2019-2020	Soloist	Alexandra Hughes
2018-2019	Soloist	Yuka Iseda
2018-2019	Soloist	Zecheng Liang
2018-2019	Soloist	Nayara Lopes
2018-2019	Soloist	Jack Thomas
2018-2019	Corps de Ballet	Aaron Anker
2018-2019	Corps de Ballet	Jacqueline Callahan
2018-2019	Corps de Ballet	Emily Davis
2018-2019	Corps de Ballet	Therese Davis
2018-2019	Corps de Ballet	Adrianna De Svastich
2018-2019	Corps de Ballet	Etienne Diaz
2018-2019	Corps de Ballet	Sydney Dolan
2018-2019	Corps de Ballet	Federico D’Ortenzi
2018-2019	Corps de Ballet	Russell Ducker
2018-2019	Corps de Ballet	Austin Eyler
2018-2019	Corps de Ballet	Marjorie Feiring
2018-2019	Corps de Ballet	Thays Golz
2018-2019	Corps de Ballet	Alexandra Heier
2018-2019	Corps de Ballet	Siobhan Howley
2018-2019	Corps de Ballet	Misa Kasamatsu
2018-2019	Corps de Ballet	Kathryn Manger
2018-2019	Corps de Ballet	Erin O’Dea
2018-2019	Corps de Ballet	Ashton Roxander
2018-2019	Corps de Ballet	So Jung Shin
2018-2019	Corps de Ballet	Jack Sprance
2018-2019	Corps de Ballet	Craig Wasserman
2018-2019	Corps de Ballet	Peter Weil
2018-2019	Apprentice	Cato Berry
2018-2019	Apprentice	Taro Kurachi
2018-2019	Apprentice	Cassidy McAndrew
2018-2019	Apprentice	Flavia Morante
2018-2019	Apprentice	Pau Pujol
2018-2019	Apprentice	Julia-Rose Sherrill
2018-2019	PBII	Paloma Berjano Torrado
2018-2019	PBII	Katherine Capristo
2018-2019	PBII	Lucia Erickson
2018-2019	PBII	Arnaldo Hernandez
2018-2019	PBII	Mine Kusano
2018-2019	PBII	Denis Maciel
2018-2019	PBII	Cory Ogdahl
2018-2019	PBII	Santiago Paniagua
2018-2019	PBII	Sophie Savas-Carstens
2018-2019	PBII	Jimmy Shughart
2018-2019	PBII	Emily Wilson
2018-2019	PBII	Carla Yamuza Masip
2017-2018	Principal Dancer	Sterling Baca
2017-2018	Principal Dancer	Lillian DiPiazza
2017-2018	Principal Dancer	Ian Hussey
2017-2018	Principal Dancer	Jermel Johnson
2017-2018	Principal Dancer	Oksana Maslova
2017-2018	Principal Dancer	Arian Molina Soca
2017-2018	Principal Dancer	Mayara Pineiro
2017-2018	Principal Dancer	Dayesi Torriente
2017-2018	Soloist	Alexandra Hughes
2017-2018	Soloist	James Ihde
2017-2018	Corps de Ballet	Aaron Anker
2017-2018	Corps de Ballet	Aleksey Babayev
2017-2018	Corps de Ballet	Ana Calderon
2017-2018	Corps de Ballet	Jacqueline Callahan
2017-2018	Corps de Ballet	Emily Davis
2017-2018	Corps de Ballet	Therese Davis
2017-2018	Corps de Ballet	Adrianna De Svastich
2017-2018	Corps de Ballet	Etienne Diaz
2017-2018	Corps de Ballet	Russell Ducker
2017-2018	Corps de Ballet	Marjorie Feiring
2017-2018	Corps de Ballet	Holly Fusco
2017-2018	Corps de Ballet	Albert Gordon
2017-2018	Corps de Ballet	Alexandra Heier
2017-2018	Corps de Ballet	Siobhan Howley
2017-2018	Corps de Ballet	Yuka Iseda
2017-2018	Corps de Ballet	Misa Kasamatsu
2017-2018	Corps de Ballet	Zecheng Liang
2017-2018	Corps de Ballet	Nayara Lopes
2017-2018	Corps de Ballet	Kathryn Manger
2017-2018	Corps de Ballet	Ashton Roxander
2017-2018	Corps de Ballet	So Jung Shin
2017-2018	Corps de Ballet	Jack Sprance
2017-2018	Corps de Ballet	Jack Thomas
2017-2018	Corps de Ballet	Craig Wasserman
2017-2018	Corps de Ballet	Peter Weil
2017-2018	Apprentice	Cato Berry
2017-2018	Apprentice	Sydney Dolan
2017-2018	Apprentice	Federico D'Ortenzi
2017-2018	Apprentice	Austin Eyler
2017-2018	Apprentice	Taro Kurachi
2017-2018	Apprentice	Cassidy McAndrew
2017-2018	Apprentice	Erin O'Dea
2017-2018	Apprentice	Julia Rose-Sherrill
2017-2018	PBII	Tanner Bleck
2017-2018	PBII	Katherine Capristo
2017-2018	PBII	Beau Chesivoir
2017-2018	PBII	Kellie Fulton
2017-2018	PBII	Flavia Morante
2017-2018	PBII	Alana Morgenstern
2017-2018	PBII	Courtney Nitting
2017-2018	PBII	Santiago Paniagua
2017-2018	PBII	Jimmy Shughart
2016-2017	Principal Dancer	Amy Aldridge
2016-2017	Principal Dancer	Sterling Baca
2016-2017	Principal Dancer	Lillian DiPiazza
2016-2017	Principal Dancer	Ian Hussey
2016-2017	Principal Dancer	Jermel Johnson
2016-2017	Principal Dancer	Oksana Maslova
2016-2017	Principal Dancer	Arian Molina Soca
2016-2017	Principal Dancer	Sara Michelle Murawski
2016-2017	Principal Dancer	Alexander Peters
2016-2017	Principal Dancer	Mayara Pineiro
2016-2017	Soloist	James Ihde
2016-2017	Soloist	Dayesi Torriente
2016-2017	Corps de Ballet	Aaron Anker
2016-2017	Corps de Ballet	Aleksey Babayev
2016-2017	Corps de Ballet	Dominic Ballard
2016-2017	Corps de Ballet	Ana Calderon
2016-2017	Corps de Ballet	Marria Cosentino-Chapin
2016-2017	Corps de Ballet	Adrianna De Svastich
2016-2017	Corps de Ballet	Etienne Diaz
2016-2017	Corps de Ballet	Russell Ducker
2016-2017	Corps de Ballet	Marjorie Feiring
2016-2017	Corps de Ballet	Holly Fusco
2016-2017	Corps de Ballet	Albert Gordon
2016-2017	Corps de Ballet	Alexandra Hughes
2016-2017	Corps de Ballet	Yuka Iseda
2016-2017	Corps de Ballet	Misa Kasamatsu
2016-2017	Corps de Ballet	Nayara Lopes
2016-2017	Corps de Ballet	Kathryn Manger
2016-2017	Corps de Ballet	Harrison Monaco
2016-2017	Corps de Ballet	So Jung Shin
2016-2017	Corps de Ballet	Jack Thomas
2016-2017	Corps de Ballet	Elizabeth Wallace
2016-2017	Corps de Ballet	Craig Wasserman
2016-2017	Corps de Ballet	Peter Weil
2016-2017	Apprentice	Nardia Boodoo
2016-2017	Apprentice	Jacqueline Callahan
2016-2017	Apprentice	Emily Davis
2016-2017	Apprentice	Therese Davis
2016-2017	Apprentice	Alexandra Heier
2016-2017	Apprentice	Michael Holden
2016-2017	Apprentice	Siobhan Howley
2016-2017	Apprentice	Jack Sprance
2015-2016	Principal Dancer	Amy Aldridge
2015-2016	Principal Dancer	Lauren Fadeley
2015-2016	Principal Dancer	Ian Hussey
2015-2016	Principal Dancer	Jermel Johnson
2015-2016	Principal Dancer	Arian Molina Soca
2015-2016	Principal Dancer	Brooke Moore
2015-2016	Principal Dancer	Alexander Peters
2015-2016	Principal Dancer	Francis Veyette
2015-2016	Soloist	Lillian DiPiazza
2015-2016	Soloist	James Ihde
2015-2016	Soloist	Evelyn Kocak
2015-2016	Soloist	Oksana Maslova
2015-2016	Soloist	Mayara Pineiro
2015-2016	Corps de Ballet	Samantha Barczak
2015-2016	Corps de Ballet	Edward Barnes
2015-2016	Corps de Ballet	Laura Bowman
2015-2016	Corps de Ballet	Daniel Cooper
2015-2016	Corps de Ballet	Marria Cosentino-Chapin
2015-2016	Corps de Ballet	Andrew Daly
2015-2016	Corps de Ballet	Etienne Diaz
2015-2016	Corps de Ballet	Russell Ducker
2015-2016	Corps de Ballet	Holly Fusco
2015-2016	Corps de Ballet	Sarah Grace Lee
2015-2016	Corps de Ballet	Kelsey Ivana Hellebuyck
2015-2016	Corps de Ballet	Amy Holihan
2015-2016	Corps de Ballet	Alexandra Hughes
2015-2016	Corps de Ballet	Rachel Jambois
2015-2016	Corps de Ballet	Misa Kasamatsu
2015-2016	Corps de Ballet	Rachel Maher
2015-2016	Corps de Ballet	Elizabeth Mateer
2015-2016	Corps de Ballet	Lorin Mathis
2015-2016	Corps de Ballet	Harrison Monaco
2015-2016	Corps de Ballet	Elizabeth Wallace
2015-2016	Corps de Ballet	Craig Wasserman
2015-2016	Corps de Ballet	Amir Yogev
2015-2016	Apprentice	Alejandro Ocasio
2014-2015	Principal Dancer	Amy Aldridge
2014-2015	Principal Dancer	Lauren Fadeley
2014-2015	Principal Dancer	Zachary Hench
2014-2015	Principal Dancer	Ian Hussey
2014-2015	Principal Dancer	Jermel Johnson
2014-2015	Principal Dancer	Brooke Moore
2014-2015	Principal Dancer	Francis Veyette
2014-2015	Soloist	Lillian DiPiazza
2014-2015	Soloist	James Ihde
2014-2015	Soloist	Evelyn Kocak
2014-2015	Soloist	Alexander Peters
2014-2015	Corps de Ballet	Samantha Barczak
2014-2015	Corps de Ballet	Edward Barnes
2014-2015	Corps de Ballet	Laura Bowman
2014-2015	Corps de Ballet	Daniel Cooper
2014-2015	Corps de Ballet	Marria Cosentino-Chapin
2014-2015	Corps de Ballet	Andrew Daly
2014-2015	Corps de Ballet	Etienne Diaz
2014-2015	Corps de Ballet	Holly Fusco
2014-2015	Corps de Ballet	Sarah Grace Lee
2014-2015	Corps de Ballet	Olivia Hartzell
2014-2015	Corps de Ballet	Kelsey Ivana Hellebuyck
2014-2015	Corps de Ballet	Leah Hirsch
2014-2015	Corps de Ballet	Amy Holihan
2014-2015	Corps de Ballet	Alexandra Hughes
2014-2015	Corps de Ballet	Rachel Jambois
2014-2015	Corps de Ballet	Misa Kasamatsu
2014-2015	Corps de Ballet	Rachel Maher
2014-2015	Corps de Ballet	Elizabeth Mateer
2014-2015	Corps de Ballet	Lorin Mathis
2014-2015	Corps de Ballet	Harrison Monaco
2014-2015	Corps de Ballet	Allison Pierce
2014-2015	Corps de Ballet	Mayara Pineiro
2014-2015	Corps de Ballet	Alex Ratcliffe-Lee
2014-2015	Corps de Ballet	Elizabeth Wallace
2014-2015	Corps de Ballet	Craig Wasserman
2014-2015	Corps de Ballet	Amir Yogev
2014-2015	Apprentice	Katherine Buchheit
2014-2015	Apprentice	Alejandro Ocasio
2013-2014	Principal Dancer	Amy Aldridge
2013-2014	Principal Dancer	Julie Diana
2013-2014	Principal Dancer	Lauren Fadeley
2013-2014	Principal Dancer	Zachary Hench
2013-2014	Principal Dancer	Ian Hussey
2013-2014	Principal Dancer	Jermel Johnson
2013-2014	Principal Dancer	Brooke Moore
2013-2014	Principal Dancer	Francis Veyette
2013-2014	Soloist	James Ihde
2013-2014	Soloist	Evelyn Kocak
2013-2014	Soloist	Jong Suk Park
2013-2014	Soloist	Gabriella Yudenich
2013-2014	Corps de Ballet	Samantha Barczak
2013-2014	Corps de Ballet	Edward Barnes
2013-2014	Corps de Ballet	Laura Bowman
2013-2014	Corps de Ballet	Daniel Cooper
2013-2014	Corps de Ballet	Marria Cosentino-Chapin
2013-2014	Corps de Ballet	Caralin Curcio
2013-2014	Corps de Ballet	Andrew Daly
2013-2014	Corps de Ballet	Lillian Di Piazza
2013-2014	Corps de Ballet	Etienne Diaz
2013-2014	Corps de Ballet	Holly Fusco
2013-2014	Corps de Ballet	Kelsey Ivana Hellebuyck
2013-2014	Corps de Ballet	Amy Holihan
2013-2014	Corps de Ballet	Alexandra Hughes
2013-2014	Corps de Ballet	Rachel Jambois
2013-2014	Corps de Ballet	Rachel Maher
2013-2014	Corps de Ballet	Elizabeth Mateer
2013-2014	Corps de Ballet	Lorin Mathis
2013-2014	Corps de Ballet	Alexander Peters
2013-2014	Corps de Ballet	Alex Ratcliffe-Lee
2013-2014	Corps de Ballet	Jonathan Stiles
2013-2014	Corps de Ballet	Elizabeth Wallace
2013-2014	Corps de Ballet	Amir Yogev
2013-2014	Apprentice	Leah Hirsch
2013-2014	Apprentice	Misa Kasamatsu
2013-2014	Apprentice	Sarah Grace Lee
2013-2014	Apprentice	Harrison Monaco
2013-2014	Apprentice	Allison Pierce
2013-2014	Apprentice	Craig Wasserman
2012-2013	Principal Dancer	Amy Aldridge
2012-2013	Principal Dancer	Julie Diana
2012-2013	Principal Dancer	Lauren Fadeley
2012-2013	Principal Dancer	Zachary Hench
2012-2013	Principal Dancer	Ian Hussey
2012-2013	Principal Dancer	Jermel Johnson
2012-2013	Principal Dancer	Brooke Moore
2012-2013	Principal Dancer	Arantxa Ochoa
2012-2013	Principal Dancer	Francis Veyette
2012-2013	Soloist	James Ihde
2012-2013	Soloist	Evelyn Kocak
2012-2013	Soloist	Abigail Mentzer
2012-2013	Soloist	Jong Suk Park
2012-2013	Soloist	Barette Vance Widell
2012-2013	Soloist	Gabriella Yudenich
2012-2013	Corps de Ballet	Samantha Barczak
2012-2013	Corps de Ballet	Edward Barnes
2012-2013	Corps de Ballet	Laura Bowman
2012-2013	Corps de Ballet	Daniel Cooper
2012-2013	Corps de Ballet	Caralin Curcio
2012-2013	Corps de Ballet	Andrew Daly
2012-2013	Corps de Ballet	Lillian Di Piazza
2012-2013	Corps de Ballet	Megan Dickenson
2012-2013	Corps de Ballet	Holly Fusco
2012-2013	Corps de Ballet	Alexandra Hughes
2012-2013	Corps de Ballet	Rachel Jambois
2012-2013	Corps de Ballet	Rachel Maher
2012-2013	Corps de Ballet	Elizabeth Mateer
2012-2013	Corps de Ballet	Lorin Mathis
2012-2013	Corps de Ballet	Alexander Peters
2012-2013	Corps de Ballet	Alex Ratcliffe-Lee
2012-2013	Corps de Ballet	Jonathan Stiles
2012-2013	Corps de Ballet	Eric Trope
2012-2013	Corps de Ballet	Amir Yogev
2012-2013	Apprentice	Amy Holihan
2012-2013	Apprentice	Misa Kasamatsu
2012-2013	Apprentice	Harrison Monaco
2012-2013	Apprentice	Elizabeth Wallace
2012-2013	Apprentice	Craig Wasserman
2011-2012	Principal Dancer	Amy Aldridge
2011-2012	Principal Dancer	Julie Diana
2011-2012	Principal Dancer	Zachary Hench
2011-2012	Principal Dancer	Riolama Lorenzo
2011-2012	Principal Dancer	Arantxa Ochoa
2011-2012	Principal Dancer	Francis Veyette
2011-2012	Soloist	Lauren Fadeley
2011-2012	Soloist	Ian Hussey
2011-2012	Soloist	James Ihde
2011-2012	Soloist	Jermel Johnson
2011-2012	Soloist	Abigail Mentzer
2011-2012	Soloist	Brooke Moore
2011-2012	Soloist	Barette Vance
2011-2012	Soloist	Gabriella Yudenich
2011-2012	Corps de Ballet	Samantha Barczak
2011-2012	Corps de Ballet	Edward Barnes
2011-2012	Corps de Ballet	Laura Bowman
2011-2012	Corps de Ballet	Daniel Cooper
2011-2012	Corps de Ballet	Caralin Curcio
2011-2012	Corps de Ballet	Andrew Daly
2011-2012	Corps de Ballet	Lillian Di Piazza
2011-2012	Corps de Ballet	Megan Dickinson
2011-2012	Corps de Ballet	Holly Lynn Fusco
2011-2012	Corps de Ballet	Rachel Jambois
2011-2012	Corps de Ballet	Evelyn Kocak
2011-2012	Corps de Ballet	Rachel Maher
2011-2012	Corps de Ballet	Lorin Mathis
2011-2012	Corps de Ballet	Jong Suk Park
2011-2012	Corps de Ballet	Alex Ratcliffe-Lee
2011-2012	Corps de Ballet	Tyler Savoie
2011-2012	Corps de Ballet	Jonathan Stiles
2011-2012	Corps de Ballet	Amir Yogev
2011-2012	Apprentice	Lara Clemens
2011-2012	Apprentice	Alexandra Hughes
2011-2012	Apprentice	Elizabeth Mateer
2011-2012	Apprentice	Alexander Peters
2011-2012	Apprentice	Eric Trope
2010-2011	Principal Dancer	Amy Aldridge
2010-2011	Principal Dancer	Martha Chamberlain
2010-2011	Principal Dancer	Julie Diana
2010-2011	Principal Dancer	Zachary Hench
2010-2011	Principal Dancer	Alexander Iziliaev
2010-2011	Principal Dancer	Riolama Lorenzo
2010-2011	Principal Dancer	Arantxa Ochoa
2010-2011	Principal Dancer	Sergio Torrado
2010-2011	Soloist	Ian Hussey
2010-2011	Soloist	James Ihde
2010-2011	Soloist	Jermel Johnson
2010-2011	Soloist	Abigail Mentzer
2010-2011	Soloist	Brooke Moore
2010-2011	Soloist	Barette Vance
2010-2011	Soloist	Francis Veyette
2010-2011	Soloist	Gabriella Yudenich
2009-2010	Corps de Ballet	Laura Bowman
2009-2010	Corps de Ballet	Daniel Cooper
2009-2010	Corps de Ballet	Caralin Curcio
2009-2010	Corps de Ballet	Andrew Daly
2009-2010	Corps de Ballet	Megan Dickinson
2009-2010	Corps de Ballet	Lauren Fadeley
2009-2010	Corps de Ballet	Holly Lynn Fusco
2009-2010	Corps de Ballet	Evelyn Kocak
2009-2010	Corps de Ballet	Rachel Maher
2009-2010	Corps de Ballet	Katelyn Prominski
2009-2010	Corps de Ballet	Tyler Savoie
2009-2010	Corps de Ballet	Jonathan Stiles
2009-2010	Corps de Ballet	Adrianna de Svastich
2009-2010	Corps de Ballet	André Vytoptov
2009-2010	Corps de Ballet	Amir Yogev
2008-2009	Apprentice	Edward Barnes
2008-2009	Apprentice	Lillian Di Piazza
2008-2009	Apprentice	Sarah Hay
2008-2009	Apprentice	Alex Ratcliffe−Lee
2008-2009	Apprentice	Kaia Tack
