= Minnesota Dance Theatre =

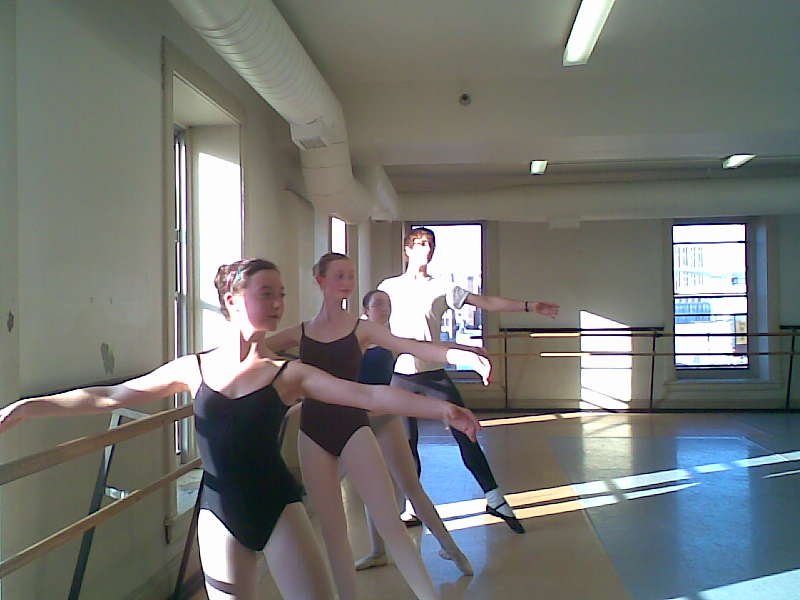
An advanced class at the barre

The Minnesota Dance Theatre (MDT) dance company and school in Minneapolis, Minnesota was founded by Loyce Houlton in 1962 as the Contemporary Dance Playhouse. It was renamed the Minnesota Dance Theatre in 1969. Lise Houlton succeeded her mother as artistic director in 1995. September 2023 Kaitlyn Gilliland, Lise Houlton's daughter took over as interim artistic director, being replaced by Elayna Waxse in 2024. In July 2024 MDT announced its new director, Lauren C Post, formally a ballerina of American Ballet Theater became Head of School on August 15, 2024.

== Performances ==
Each holiday season MDT previously presented the ballet Loyce Houlton's Nutcracker Fantasy based on Tchaikovsky's The Nutcracker but the holiday show will be performed outside of MDT because of the Houlton Family's licensing in 2024 . Ballet Arts Minnesota and the company's school joined in 2006 to become The Dance Institute. The organization is based in the Cowles Center for Dance and the Performing Arts.In 2012, as part of their 50th Anniversary season, MDT produced an updated version of their once controversial Carmina Burana, in collaboration with Dominique Serrand, of the former Theatre de la Jeune Lune. The Houlton family is also performing this

== Classes and Divisions ==
Minnesota Dance Theatre offers classes for students and adults. The school has two main divisions, the Primary Division and the Upper Division. Both divisions have performance opportunities including in MDT's Nutcracker Suite and their annual showcases in winter and spring. MDT offers ballet fundamentals, beginning ballet, intermediate ballet, and advanced professional ballet classes, making it possible for somebody at any level to take a class.

In the upper division, it is broken into six main levels: 1a,1b,2a,2b,3, and 3+. The levels vary by which days of the week they take class and how many hours of the week they dance. They also offer a pre-professional program (enterable only bu audition), with mor intense hours during the day along with evening classes and one on one training.

== Prince and MDT ==
Prince was a student at the Minnesota Dance Theatre through the Urban Arts Program of the Minneapolis Public Schools.

== CAN dance ==
Minnesota Dance Theatre also offers a separate program some years, called CAN dance. Students ages 12-18 yrs old are invited to a tuition free class, included with free snacks, dance attire, and transport to MDT's site. They are taught the foundations of jazz, hip-hop, ballet, contemporary, and jazz. This program was part of MDT in the past but was discontinued until 2024.

== Teachers, Artists, and Guests ==
Minnesota Dance Theater is under direction of Lauren C. Post, Post danced in the Corps de Ballet at American Ballet for 17 years. She also founded CoLab dance in New York City, and is a certified ballet teacher through the ABT curriculum.

Joanna Mednick is the Artistic Associate of MDT, she trained at the City Ballet School of San Francisco until receiving the prestigious coca-cola award to train at the ABT school. She danced as a corps member at San Francisco ballet and as a grand sujet at the Dutch National Ballet.

MDT often has many guest teachers and artists that come either regularly or have in the past, some of these guests include Isabella Boylston, Gillian Murphy, Brady Farrar, Ingrid Silva, Katie Deuitch, Gemma Bond, Eric Tamm, Sasha Mukhamedov, Max Azaro, and many more.
