= Clark Tippet =

American choreographer (1954–1994)

Clark Tippet (October 5, 1954, in Parsons, Kansas – January 28, 1992) was an American ballet dancer and choreographer. He was a member of the American Ballet Theatre company in New York City. Among other roles, he was featured as the male Spanish dancer in Mikhail Baryshnikov's production of Pytor Ilyich Tchaikovsky's ballet The Nutcracker. The production was first televised in 1977.

Tippet died of HIV/AIDS on January 28, 1992, in Parsons, aged 37.

== Sources ==
- American Ballet Theatre - Clark Tippet Biography
- POBA | Where the Arts Live: Clark Tippet Biography
