= Steps on Broadway =

Dance studio in New York City

Coordinates: 40°46′51″N 73°58′54″W

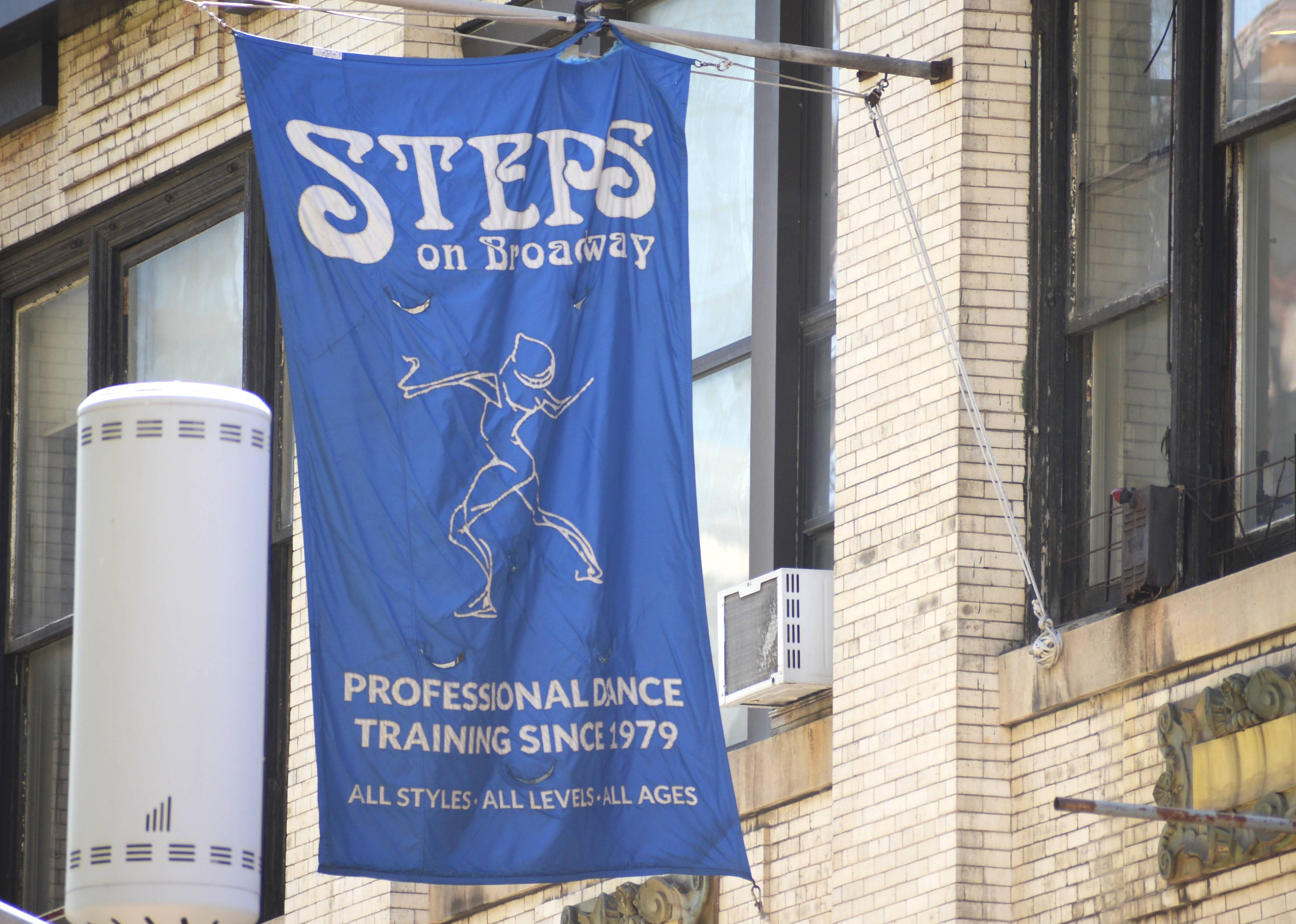
Steps' banner in front of its studio

Steps on Broadway, or Steps, in New York City is a large dance studio located on 74th Street and Broadway on the Upper West Side. The studio forms a central part of the New York City dance community and a hub for the international community.

== Programs ==
Steps has open classes, which run 7 days a week and see more than 3,000 visitors a week. It also runs a dance school with a program for young dancers.

While it is not affiliated with any professional company, it is known to be frequented by professional dancers from New York’s top dance companies, including New York City Ballet and American Ballet Theatre.

The primary draw for the studio lies in its more than 125 globally renowned faculty, and its vast offerings, which cover all different kinds of dance styles from ballet to flamenco. In addition, classes are accessible to anyone, regardless of training level or age.

== History ==
The studio was founded in 1979 by Carol Paumgarten alongside Patrice Soriero, a jazz choreographer. Its first location was a single room on 56th and Broadway. From there, it moved in 1981 to 1845 Broadway between 60th and 61st, the former location of a famous ballet school run by Melissa Hayden, but soon moved to its current location in 1984. At 74th and Broadway, it started with one floor and five studios, but has now expanded to consist of eleven studios as well as dressing rooms and more.

A school for young dancers was started under the name "The School at Steps" in 2002 as a curriculum based training program. Now called the Steps Youth Programs, it has around 800 students. Steps also houses a branch called Steps Beyond, which focuses on performances by faculty, guests, or lectures.

In the 1990s, Paumgarten and her husband bought out Soriero's share of Steps.

== Awards and Recognition ==
In 2019, Paumgarten was recognized by the Chita Rivera Awards with a Vanguard Award for her founding of Steps and its contribution to the dance community.
