= Elaine DePrince =

American author, activist and teacher (1947–2024)

- DePrince in 2022
- Born: Elaine DiGiacomo; August 6, 1947
- Died: September 11, 2024 (aged 77)
- Education: Rutgers University
- Occupations: Writer, educator, activist
- Notable work: Taking Flight: From War Orphan to Star Ballerina; Cry Bloody Murder: A Tale of Tainted Blood
- Spouse: Charles DePrince (m. 1971; died 2020)
- Children: 11, including Michaela DePrince

Elaine DePrince (née DiGiacomo, August 6, 1947 – September 11, 2024) was an American author, hemophilia activist, teacher, and advocate of adoptive parenting. The mother of eleven children, she was best known as the adoptive mother of ballet dancer Michaela DePrince and the co-author of her memoir, Taking Flight: From War Orphan to Star Ballerina (2014). She was interviewed in the 2011 documentary First Position, discussing the racism they encountered as Michaela pursued training in classical ballet. She was also the author of Cry Bloody Murder: A Tale of Tainted Blood (1997), which tells the story of her family's ordeal after their three hemophiliac sons were infected with HIV/AIDS in the 1980s. In the book, DePrince holds pharmaceutical companies, the Food and Drug Administration, and the National Bleeding Disorders Foundation responsible for failing to ensure the safety of blood plasma products.

== Early life and marriage ==
Elaine DiGiacomo was born on August 6, 1947, she attended Camden Catholic High School in Cherry Hill, New Jersey. She was a graduate of Rutgers University.

She was inspired to adopt in fifth grade, when she read The Family Nobody Wanted by Helen Doss. The book tells the true story of a family with twelve children, including children who had been considered "unadoptable" because they were non-white or had special needs.

DePrince said in interviews that she discussed her desire to adopt with Charles DePrince before they were married, and that he agreed. Elaine and Charles DePrince were married in May 1971 in Pennsauken, New Jersey. They had two biological sons, Adam and Erik.

== Adoption of sons ==
Since childhood, DePrince had numerous health problems. She did not learn until after Adam and Erik were born that she had Von Willebrand disease, a blood clotting disorder similar to hemophilia, and both sons were diagnosed with it as well. Both sons had unusual episodes of bleeding from a very young age.

In 1980, the DePrinces adopted their son Michael, nearly two, who had hemophilia and was deaf and disabled following a bus accident. Given their family experience with bleeding disorders, Elaine and Charles felt equipped to care for him. Five years later, New Jersey officials asked them to adopt two more boys (Cubby and Teddy) with hemophilia who had been living in a hospital, knowing that the couple was familiar with the medical care required, which included mixing freeze-dried clotting factor with sterile water and injecting them several times weekly.

In May 1988, the DePrinces learned that their three adopted sons were HIV-positive. Like roughly half of all 20,000 hemophiliacs in the United States, their sons had contracted the HIV/AIDS virus from injecting contaminated blood-clotting products. Their son Cubby died on June 9, 1993, at age 11, followed by Michael who died on March 14, 1994, at age 15. Teddy battled the virus with the help of new protease inhibitor drugs, which initially reduced his viral load below detectable levels, but two years later the HIV infection returned; he died in 2004 at age 24.

=== Activism and lawsuits ===
DePrince wrote that the deaths of her two young sons left her wanting to die. She decided to investigate how the tainted blood products had ended up being given to hemophiliacs, and to seek justice for them and their families. She lobbied successfully to have the New Jersey Legislature extend the statute of limitations so that hemophiliacs could sue for compensation.

The DePrinces joined more than 100 other New Jersey and New York families in a class action lawsuit filed in 1993. The suit accused clotting factor manufacturers of negligence in the early 1980s, when they failed to warn patients that their products were contaminated with hepatitis. Elaine DePrince emerged as one of the leading advocates for hemophiliacs and their families, repeatedly sharing the story of Cubby and Michael and her anger that their deaths were preventable.

In July 1997, DePrince joined other hemophilia activists in lobbying senators in Washington, D.C., to pass federal legislation awarding funds to AIDS-infected hemophiliacs or their survivors because the infected products had been approved by the Food and Drug Administration (FDA). Around that time, the DePrinces were among the families that declined a proposed $100,000 settlement from the pharmaceutical companies for hemophiliac AIDS victims or their survivors, arguing that it was not enough.

=== Cry Bloody Murder ===
DePrince's book, Cry Bloody Murder: A Tale of Tainted Blood, published by Random House in July 1997, wove the story of her family's ordeal with her argument that drug companies, the FDA, and the National Hemophilia Foundation were responsible. One of the central points in her book is that a technique for inactivating any hepatitis B virus or HIV in clotting factor products had been developed in Germany in 1978 and was marketed there in 1980, but was not used by the four pharmaceutical companies in the U.S. until 1986. DePrince argued that the quest for profit and collusion between government agencies and industry caused manufacturers to delay making their blood products safer. Manufacturers of blood products, she said, also refused to screen for diseases in blood, despite the high risk associated with paid plasma donations from people in desperate circumstances, such as intravenous drug users.

A 1997 review in The Lancet said that two aspects of the book were "unlikely to be equalled" by future accounts:

One is the haunting glimpse [DePrince] gives into the mechanics of family life with three mortally ill young boys, all of whom contribute voices to this book ... The other nuance of the story on which DePrince is quite superb is her own slow realisation of the extent to which all facets of health care in late 20th century America are permeated by, and often dependent on, industry profit margins and bottom lines. The deep financial ties between the National Hemophilia Association, the plasma-fractionating industry, and individual practising haematologists are hardly unique in medicine.

== Adoption of daughters ==
The DePrinces eventually accepted a modest settlement. They decided to honor their son Michael's desire to adopt a child from Africa. In 1999, Elaine took a leave of absence from law school to go to Sierra Leone. The DePrinces initially planned to adopt one girl named Mabinty, who was then renamed Mia Mabinty DePrince. When the adoption agency told Elaine that there was another girl named Mabinty, who had been refused by twelve other families due to a skin pigmentation condition called vitiligo, she knew immediately that she wanted to adopt her as well. She called the second girl Michaela, in memory of Michael. In 2001, the DePrinces adopted a third girl they called Mariel, after her first adoptive mother could no longer care for her. In 2003, they adopted a fourth girl, a teenager from Liberia. The family eventually adopted six girls from West Africa, DePrince said, "because the need was so great".

In total, Elaine and Charles DePrince raised eleven children, including nine who were adopted. They lived for many years in Cherry Hill, New Jersey. In 2006, the family moved to Vermont, where Elaine and Charles had lived as newlyweds, to escape the painful reminders of their sons who died. They later moved to Manhattan, after Michaela accepted a scholarship to the American Ballet Theatre's Jacqueline Kennedy Onassis School.

=== First Position ===
Michaela DePrince was catapulted to fame as one of six young ballet dancers featured in the 2011 documentary film, First Position, which followed their preparation for the annual Youth America Grand Prix. In one scene, the camera follows Elaine DePrince as she paints the elastic straps and undergarments of Michaela's tutus with brown dye to match her skin tone. She also discusses the "crass" comment made by another parent about black girls not being able to dance ballet.

In addition, DePrince discusses Michaela's vitiligo, describing the unfounded fear that many adults had about her spots, her being called a "devil's child" in Sierra Leone, and her initial self-consciousness about the visibility of her spots while dancing.

=== Ballerina Dreams and Taking Flight ===
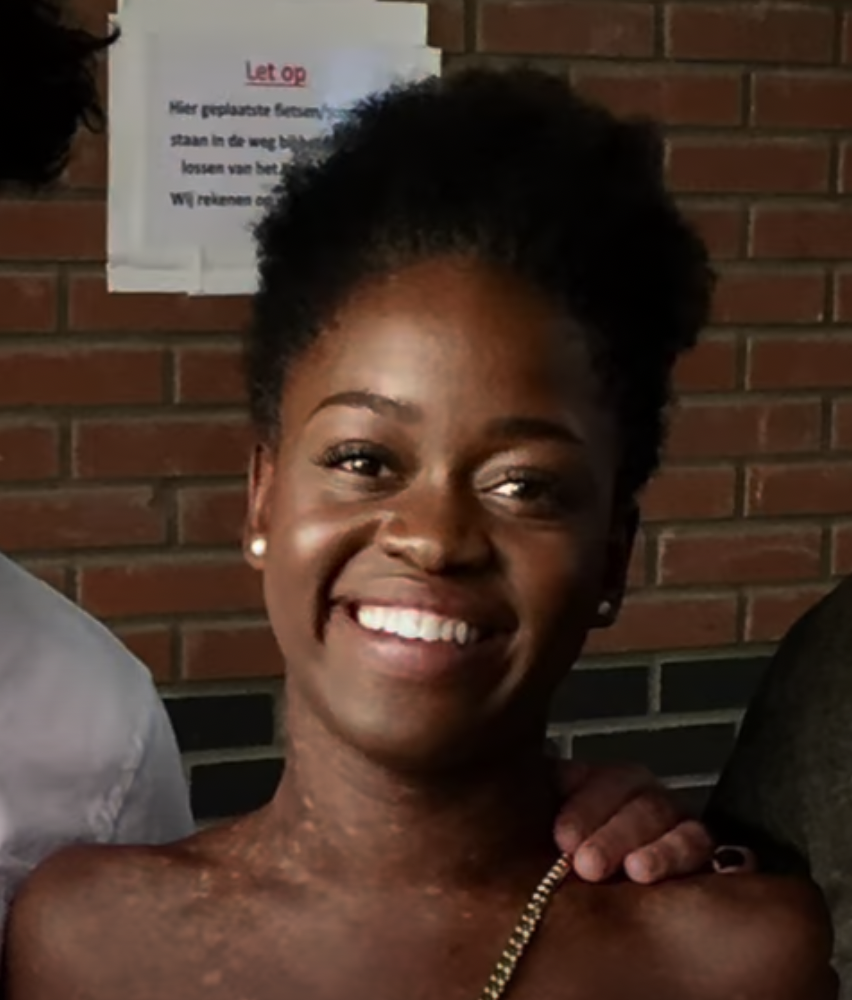
Michaela DePrince

Over the years, DePrince collected stories from Michaela's life and planned to turn them into a picture book. She sent agents a 700-word manuscript about the magazine photo of a ballerina which Michaela had found and kept while at the orphanage in Sierra Leone, which inspired her to dream to dance. Encouraged by a literary agent, DePrince agreed to work on a more complete memoir with Michaela. In 2013, Knopf purchased the rights to both a memoir and a children's book.

An illustrated children's book, Ballerina Dreams: From Orphan to Dancer, was published by Random House in 2014. Co-authored by Michaela and Elaine DePrince, it is targeted at children in first to third grade, and tells the story of how Michaela was sent to an orphanage after her parents died, was adopted by an American family, and became a professional ballerina after years of hard work, determination, and training.

The full-length memoir, Taking Flight: From War Orphan to Star Ballerina, was also published by Random House in 2014. Kirkus Reviews said that, "Readers will find her life story gripping whether or not they are dance fans. The dialogue is fictionalized, but the heart of the journey resonates in this mother/daughter collaboration." Publishers Weekly said:

There is plenty of ballet detail for dance lovers to revel in, and the authors achieve a believable, distinctive teenage voice with a nice touch of lyrical description: "I ... learned that pain, like the green of the jungle leaves, comes in many shades".

For the memoir, Elaine wrote sections based on her notes and sent them to Michaela, who by then had moved to Amsterdam to dance with the Dutch National Ballet. They discussed how to shape the narrative of Michaela's life and reviewed each section via Skype, email, and Viber.

== Later life and death ==
The DePrinces moved to Fayetteville, Georgia. Charles DePrince died in June 2020, during the COVID-19 pandemic, at the age of 76.

Elaine DePrince died of complications from a routine pre-surgical procedure on September 11, 2024, at the age of 77. Her daughter Michaela had died the previous day at the age of 29; Elaine was reportedly unaware of Michaela's death.
