= Joo Won Ahn =

South Korean ballet dancer

- Born: 1993 (age 32–33); Wonju, South Korea
- Education: Y.J. Ballet People Academy; Sunhwa Arts School; Korea National University of Arts
- Occupation: ballet dancer
- Years active: 2012–present
- Career
- Current group: American Ballet Theatre

Korean name
- Hangul: 안주원
- RR: An Juwon
- MR: An Chuwŏn

Joo Won Ahn (born 1993) is a South Korean ballet dancer who is currently a principal dancer with the American Ballet Theatre.

Ahn was born in Wonju. He trained at the Y.J. Ballet People Academy and Sunhwa Arts School, then entered the Korea National University of Arts in 2012. In 2013, after he won a gold medal at the Youth America Grand Prix, he joined the American Ballet Theatre Studio Company. He became an apprentice with the main company in January the following year and was taken to the corps de ballet five months later. He became a soloist in 2019 and principal dancer in 2020, at age 26. He is the second Korean to reach this position, after Hee Seo.
