= Mikyung Sung =

- Born: September 1, 1993 (age 32); Seoul, South Korea
- Genres: Classical
- Occupation: Double Bassist
- Instrument: Double Bass
- Years active: 2006–present
- Website: mikyungsung.com

Mikyung Sung (Korean: 성미경, sometimes spelled Mikyung Soung, born September 1, 1993, in Seoul, South Korea) is a classical double bass player.

== Education ==
Born into a musical family, Mikyung Sung first studied piano and cello, then started playing bass at age 10. Her lessons were initially from her father, Youngseog Sung, who played bass for 30 years in the Seoul Philharmonic Orchestra. She was accompanied on piano by her mother, Inja Choi, who was pianist for the Korean National Choir. Her brother Minje, three years older, with whom she played many duos while growing up, is also an international award-winning double bassist, having won both the J.M. Sperger and the Koussevitsky competitions.

After attending the Sunhwa Arts School, she attended the Korea National University of Arts Preliminary School before earning a Bachelor of Music degree there as a gifted student in 2013, studying with Ho-gyo Lee.

She earned an Artist Diploma in 2017 at the Conservatory of Music of the Colburn School in Los Angeles, where she studied with Peter Lloyd. She also participated in master classes with Janne Saksala, Rinat Ibragimov, Joseph Conyers, and Klaus Trumpf, as well as with violinist Arnold Steinhardt and cellists Peter Wiley and Hans Jørgen Jensen.

== Competitions ==
In South Korea she received first prize in competitions such as the Korean Chamber Orchestra (KCO) Music Competition in 2007, Haneum National Music Competition, Music Education Journal Competition, and Korea Double Bass Association Competition in 2010.

In 2010 she was awarded First Prize, Audience Prize, and the Special Jury Prize at the International J. M. Sperger Competition for Double Bass in Germany, after having placed fourth two years before. As a result, she subsequently was invited to perform with orchestras in Koblenz, Neubrandenburg, and Dessau.

At the International Society of Bassists (ISB) Convention in Colorado in 2015, she was awarded the Thomas Martin Prize for the Best Performance of a Work by Bottesini, as well as second place overall in the solo division.

At the 2016 ARD International Music Competition she progressed to the second round in the double bass category.

At the 2017 Bradetich Foundation Competition she won the internet-voted prize for her finals performance of Bottesini's Concerto No. 2, as well as Honorable Mention overall.

== Solo performances ==
=== With orchestra ===
Her professional debut as a soloist was at age 12 with the Guri Philharmonic in South Korea. Since then, she has performed as a soloist with orchestras including the Staatsorchester Rheinische Philharmonie Koblenz in 2011, Neubrandenburger Philharmonie, Anhaltische Philharmonie Dessau, Philharmonie Baden-Baden, Philharmonia Corea, Concordia College Orchestra, Korea National University of Arts Orchestra, Sunhwa Arts School Orchestra, Caesura Youth Orchestra in 2016, Colburn Orchestra in 2016 and 2017 at Zipper Hall, the Wallis Annenberg Center for the Performing Arts and the Soraya Center for the Performing Arts, and Seongnam Philharmonic Orchestra in 2019.

=== Recitals ===
She performed in Prodigy and Young Artist recitals at the Kumho Art Hall in 2007 and 2010, the Korea National University of Arts concert series, recital and Performance Forum appearances at Thayer Hall at the Colburn School, several times at the Huntington Library in 2016–18, the 2018 One Month Festival, several times at The House Concert series presented by Park Chang-soo in Seoul, Korea in 2018–19, and at the Kukje Art Hall in 2019.

She was most often accompanied in her early years by her mother, Inja Choi, from 2014 to 2015 by Eloise Kim, from 2016 to 2018 by Jaemin Shin, and since 2019 by Ilya Rashkovskiy.

=== Duos and chamber music ===
She performed duos with her brother, Minjie Sung, as "2Bass" and the "MJK Ensemble," including at the Ditto Festival in 2007, Kumho Art Hall in 2011, and The House Concert in Korea in 2013. She also performed in bass duos with Sukyung Chun and pianist Eloise Kim at Colburn in 2014 and the Sierra Madre Playhouse in 2015. That same year she also performed in a bass quartet led by her brother at the Ditto Festival in Seoul.

She has also played in chamber music concerts, for instance at the Mount St. Mary's University Doheny Mansion and Palm Springs Life Festival in 2016 and Shanghai Orchestra Academy in 2018.

In 2020, she formed a double bass quartet called the Emeth Ensemble, which has played concerts in Korea and released videos on YouTube.

=== Television ===
Mikyung Sung was a featured young artist on the KBS1 Classic Odyssey 2011 New Years Special and was the featured performer on the first regular episode of KBS's series "Masterpiece Scandal", also in 2011. She and her brother Minje were featured on the KBS1 show Classic Odyssey in 2013, with their mother as piano accompanist.

=== Internet ===
Some of her impromptu videos have achieved viral popularity, including of the Gigue from Hans Fryba's Suite in the Olden Style and of Bottesini's Elegy No. 1 that each received over a million views on Facebook, as well as being available on YouTube.

== Orchestral playing and teaching ==
After university, she auditioned for and won positions in two Korean orchestras, including Assistant Principal Bass of the Seoul Philharmonic Orchestra; however, she declined both positions in order to pursue graduate studies in the United States.

She performed as a principal bass with the Shanghai Symphony Orchestra and taught on the double bass faculty of the Shanghai Orchestra Academy for the 2018–2019 concert season.

== Discography ==
The Colburn Sessions. Music of Giovanni Bottesini, Jules Massenet, Paul Hindemith, Vilmos Montag, Felix Mendelssohn, Sergei Rachmaninoff, and César Franck. Jaemin Shin, collaborative pianist. (2023)

== Name ==
Initially her name was most often transliterated as "Mikyung Soung", and it shows up as such in material related to various competitions, concerts, as referred to by The Colburn School, and media coverage of such events. However, more recently, she has switched all her social media accounts to "Mikyung Sung", consistent with how her father and brother now consistently spell their names, and all concert programs from 2019 have used this spelling.
