= Jeon Min-chul =

South Korean ballet dancer (born 2004)

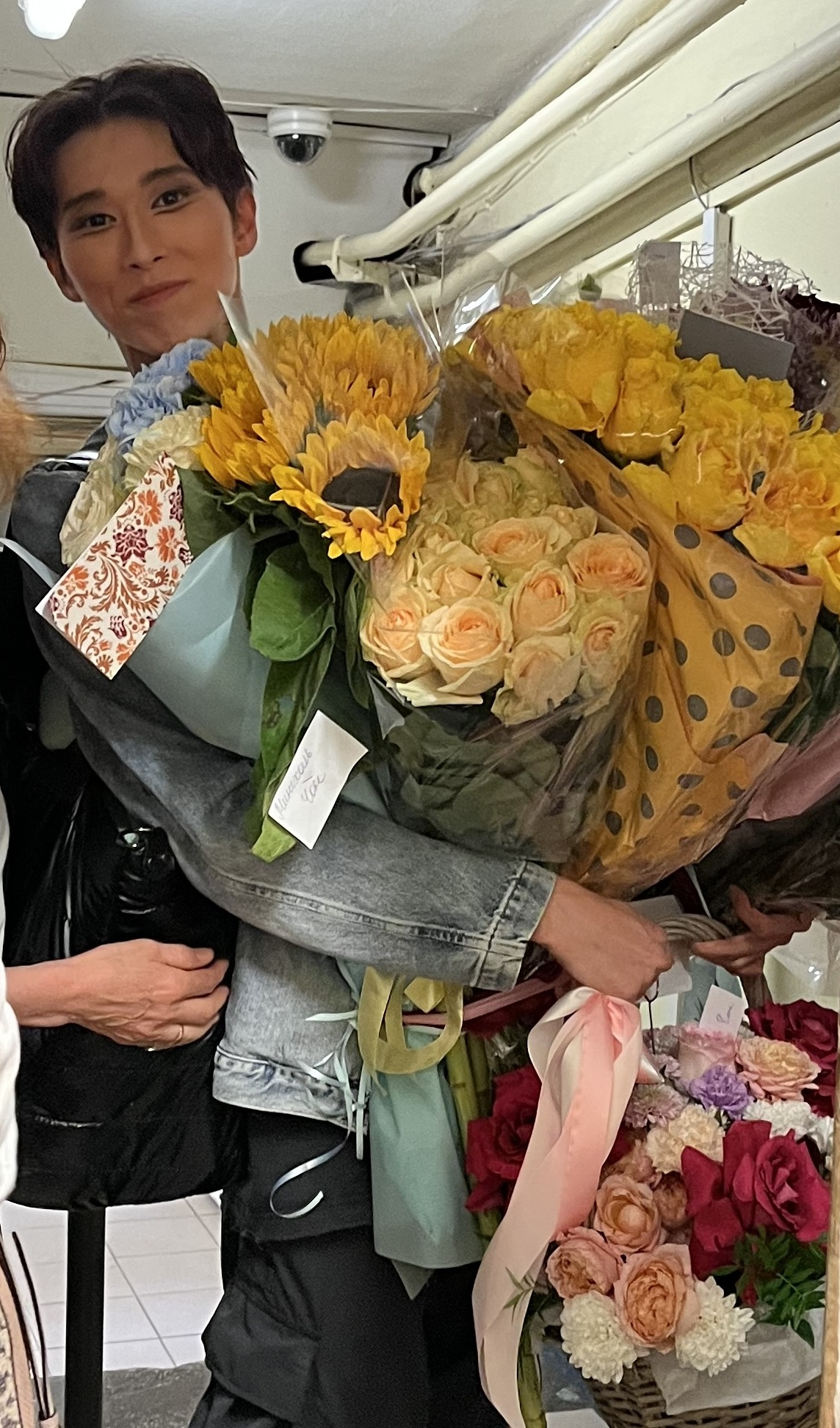
- Jeon Mincheol at 17th of July after his debut as Solor at Mariinsky theatre
- Born: 19 June 2004 (age 22); Gwangju, Gyeonggi Province, South Korea
- Education: Sunhwa Arts School; Korea National University of Arts
- Occupation: First soloist
- Years active: 2024–present
- Height: 184
- Dancing career
- Current group: Mariinsky Theatre

Korean name
- Hangul: 전민철
- Hanja: 全珉徹
- RR: Jeon Mincheol
- MR: Chŏn Minch'ŏl

Jeon Min-chul (Korean: 전민철; born 19 June 2004) is a South Korean ballet dancer, first soloist with the Mariinsky Theatre ballet company. Winner of the international ballet competition Youth America Grand Prix (2025), one of the most prestigious international ballet competitions. Only the second Korean ballet dancer ever admitted to the Mariinsky's ballet company, after principal dancer Kim Ki-min.

== Biography ==
Jeon was born on June 19, 2004, in Gwangju, Gyeonggi Province, South Korea, to a family of office workers. He has an older sister and brother.

The first ballet Jeon ever watched was Giselle. After seeing it on TV, he told his mother he wanted to start ballet.

His parents signed him up for Korean Traditional dance due to weak health. The studio director later recommended him to audition for the lead role in the musical Billy Elliot in 2017. Candidates underwent 8 weeks of training (6 days/week) in tap dance, ballet, contemporary dance, and singing. The selection was broadcast on the Korean TV show Finding a Genius (aired nationwide on SBS). Jeon advanced to the finals – seven candidates were selected out of 200 – but ultimately wasn't chosen as one of the four Billy performers due to his voice breaking and his height exceeding 150 cm.

After the failed audition, he briefly stopped dancing. However, persuaded by the musical's choreography director, he transferred from a regular middle school to Sunhwa Arts Middle School and began specializing in ballet. Despite starting ballet relatively compared to his peers, he gained a place at Sunhwa Arts High School after placing first in its admissions audition.

After high school, he entered the Korea National University of Arts and graduated in 2022 under the gifted student program in dance performance.

In 2019, Jeon won second prize at the Korea International Ballet Competition. That same year, he reached the Top 12 Junior finals at the Youth America Grand Prix (Seoul, 2019). In 2023, he competed at the Youth America Grand Prix (Tampa and New York, 2023) in both the pas de deux and Solo Variation categories, winning first place in the pas de deux and third place in the Solo Variation. By winning first prize at one of ballet's major competitions, he earned exemption from mandatory Korean military service at just 18 years old.

On June 6, 2024, he performed at the Ballet Layer Gala in two pieces: The Walk and Boléro, choreographed by Kim Yeongol.

At the end of June 2024 it was announced that Jeon would participate in a closed audition for the Mariinsky Theatre ballet company—one of the world's top five ballet ensembles—thanks to the support of Kim Kimin, principal dancer, who had shared footage of Jeon's performances with Yuri Fateev, the Mariinsky's ballet répétiteur. Shortly afterward, in early July, following a week-long audition process in Saint Petersburg, Jeon was invited to join the company as a soloist—bypassing the traditional entry-level position in the corps de ballet.

On August 3–4, 2024, he performed in the production Asteros Ballet in Japan. On August 28, 2024, he appeared in Ballet with Commentary alongside Professor Kim Yeongol.

In August 2024 it was announced that Universal Ballet had invited Jeon to debut in the principal role of Solor in La Bayadère on September 27, 2024.

Jeon's life story inspired sculptor Go Yoseong to create the work "Jeon Mincheol, the Cold Wind and Bonfire", which was exhibited at the Doosan Art Center's Doosan Gallery in January 2025.

In February 2025 Jeon performed in the encore of the pas de deux "Dancing with Pierrot".

On Valentine's Day (February 14), 2025, Jeon premiered his self-choreographed piece "Dream of Love during the "Franz Liszt Night" performance at the Mapo Art Center.

In early April 2025 it was announced that Universal Ballet had selected Jeon as a guest artist for the role of Count Albrecht in Giselle on April 18 and 20, 2025.

Immediately after his performance in Giselle on April 20, Jeon flew to the United States to compete in the Youth America Grand Prix (Tampa, April 21–27, 2025), where he won the Grand Prix.

After Jeon's arrival in Saint Petersburg on June 12, 2025, Andrian Fadeyev, Artistic Director of the Mariinsky Theatre, informed him that his debut in a leading role would take place on July 17 in the ballet La Bayadère.

On July 4, 2025, he made his debut as a guest artist on the Mariinsky Theatre stage in the pas de trois of the Prince's Friends in the ballet Swan Lake.

On July 17, as scheduled, he debuted in the principal role of Solor on the Mariinsky Theatre stage in the ballet La Bayadère.

Since October 2025 he has held the official position of first soloist with the Mariinsky Theatre.

On October 25, he debuted in the principal role of Count Albrecht on the Mariinsky Theatre stage in the ballet Giselle.

== Repertoire ==
=== With Universal Ballet ===
- September 27, 2024 – Solor, La Bayadère
- April 18, 2025 – Count Albrecht, Giselle

=== With Mariinsky Theatre ===
- July 4, 2025 – Pas de Trois of the Prince's Friends in the ballet "Swan Lake", choreography by Marius Petipa and Lev Ivanov (1895), revised choreography and stage direction: Konstantin Sergeyev (1950)
- July 17, 2025 – Solor, "La Bayadère", choreography by Marius Petipa (1877), revised choreography by Vladimir Ponomarev and Vakhtang Chabukiani (1941) with dances by Konstantin Sergeyev and Nikolai Zubkovsky
- October 25, 2025 – Count Albrecht, Giselle, choreography by Jean Coralli, Jules Perrot and Marius Petipa

== Awards ==
- Prize-winner at the Youth America Grand Prix international competition (Tampa, USA; Grand Prix, 2025; 1st prize in the pas de deux category and 3rd prize in the solo category, 2023)
- Prize-winner at the Korea International Ballet Competition (Seoul, 2019; 2nd prize)
- Prize-winner at the Youth America Grand Prix international competition (Seoul, 2019; best male dancer in the junior age division)
