= Bess Kargman =

American filmmaker

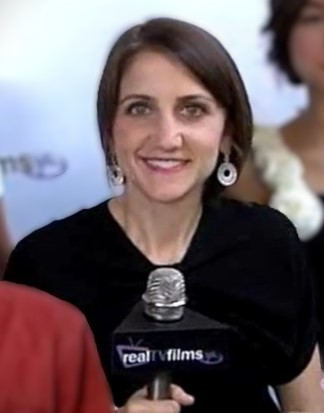
- Education: Amherst College; Columbia University School of Journalism
- Occupations: Filmmaker, director, documentarian, producer, editor
- Notable work: First Position; Diane Warren: Relentless

Bess Kargman is an American filmmaker and director. She directed the documentary films First Position (2011) and Diane Warren: Relentless (2025). She also created the 2020 documentary series Defying Gravity: The Untold Story of Women’s Gymnastics.

== Early life ==
Kargman grew up in Brookline, Massachusetts with two siblings, Harry and Sophie. She studied at Boston Ballet for almost a decade and attended the Shady Hill School. She stopped ballet and began playing competitive sports including tennis, soccer, skiing and ice hockey. She attended high school at Concord Academy in Concord, Massachusetts before studying fine arts and playing varsity ice hockey at Amherst College. She earned a Masters in Science from Columbia Graduate School of Journalism in 2008.

== Career ==
After graduating from Amherst, Kargman moved to New York City, where she earned her real estate license and took night classes in op-ed writing. In 2006, she published her first op-ed in The Washington Post and later enrolled in Columbia University School of Journalism, where she earned a concentration in documentary and new media studies.

After she graduated journalism school, amidst the Great Recession, Kargman worked as an unpaid intern at a production company, where she found her inspiration for her future film, First Position. To create the film, she started her own production company and hired a crew. For First Position, Kargman spent over a year following six young ballet dancers from around the world as they prepared for the 2010 Youth America Grand Prix finals in New York City. The documentary was picked up by Sundance Selects/IFC Films and premiered at the 2011 Toronto International Film Festival and later in nearly 200 theaters. First Position was a hit among film critics, at film festivals, and with audiences, and it has won various awards, including both the Audience Award and Best New Director at the Portland International Film Festival, the Audience Award at the Dallas International Film Festival, and the Jury Prize at the San Francisco Documentary Film Festival. 93% of critical reviews were positive according to review aggregator Rotten Tomatoes.

In 2013, Kargman directed and edited an ESPN Films documentary short COACH about legendary Rutgers University women's basketball coach C. Vivian Stringer as a part of ESPN's "Nine for IX" series, for which Whoopi Goldberg served as executive producer. COACH won Best Documentary Short at the 2013 Tribeca Film Festival and received a nomination for a Sports Emmy Award.

In 2020, Kargman created a six epsisode documentary series, Defying Gravity: The Untold Story of Women’s Gymnastics, which premiered on YouTube Premium.

In 2020, Kargman was selected as a fellow for the American Film Showcase, a program for the U.S. Department of State, to represent the United States.

In 2024, Kargman directed the documentary Diane Warren: Relentless, which provides an intimate look at the songwriter's career. The film received a nomination for Best Original Song at the 98th Academy Awards.

Kargman has directed or created documentary shorts for Teen Vogue, PBS, Major League Soccer, National Public Radio, and the NBC Olympics. She also directs commercials and creates content for companies around the world.

== Awards ==
Year	Award	Category	Nominated work	Result
2011	Toronto International Film Festival	People's Choice Award: Documentaries	First Position	Runner-up
2011	San Francisco Docfest	Jury Prize	First Position	Won
2011	Doc NYC	Audience Award	First Position	Won
2011	Doc NYC	Metropolis Grand Jury Prize	First Position	Nominated
2012	Portland International Film Festival	Audience Award	First Position	Won
2012	Portland International Film Festival	Best New Director	First Position	Won
2012	Dallas International Film Festival	Audience Award	First Position	Won
2012	Baja International Film Festival	Documentary Prize	First Position	Won
2012	Fred & Adele Astaire Awards	Outstanding Dance Documentary	First Position	Nominated
2013	Chlotrudis Awards	Best Documentary	First Position	Nominated
2013	NAACP Image Awards	Outstanding Documentary (Theatrical or TV)	First Position	Nominated
2013	Tribeca Film Festival	Best Documentary Short	COACH	Won
2013	Sports Emmy Awards	Outstanding Short Sports Documentary	COACH	Nominated
