= Giuseppe Bausilio =

Swiss actor, dancer, singer And Producer

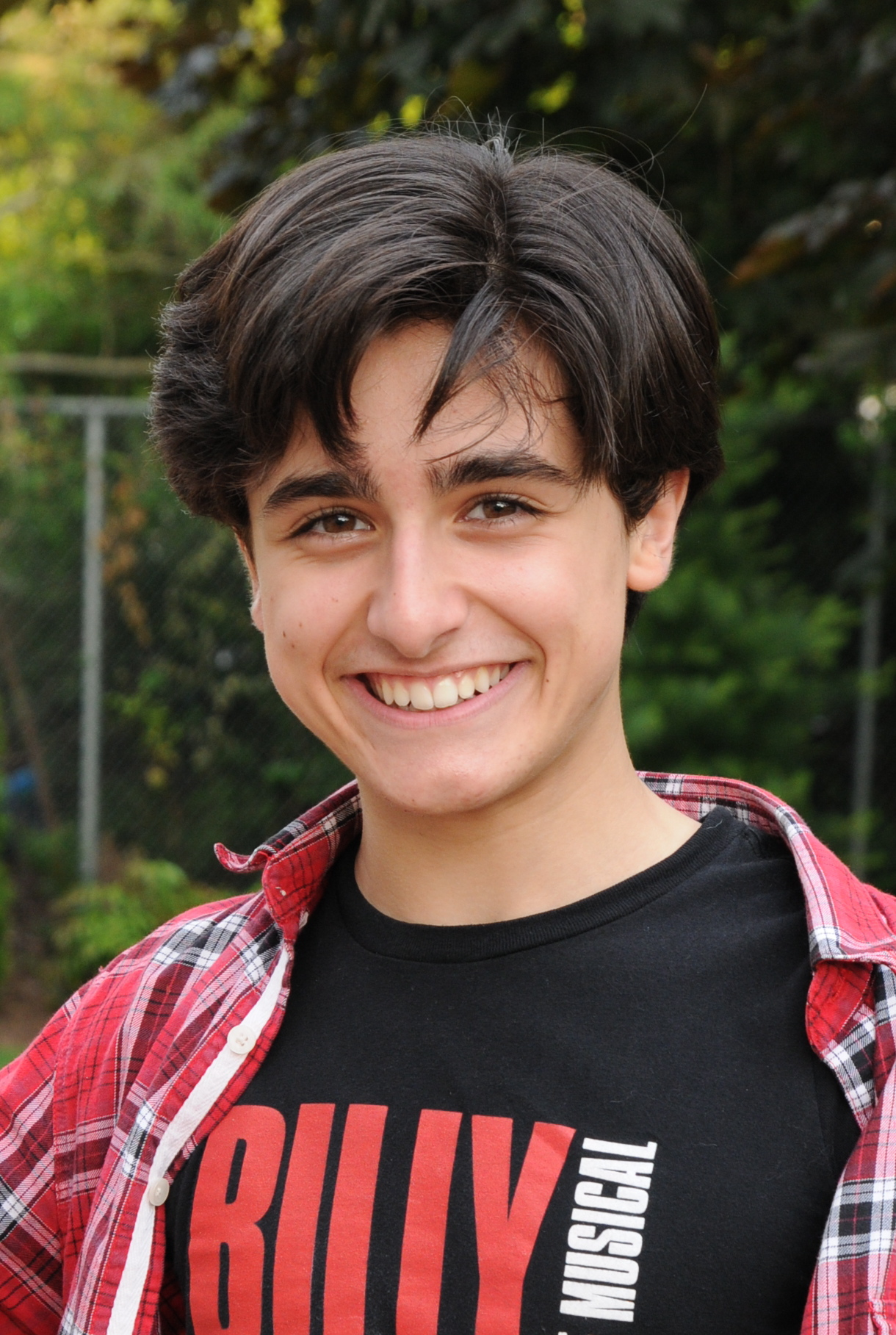
- Bausilio in 2012
- Born: June 20, 1997 (age 28); Bern, Switzerland
- Occupation: Actor
- Years active: 2006–present
- Website: giuseppebausilio.com

Giuseppe Bausilio (born June 20, 1997) is a Swiss actor, dancer, and singer. Bausilio is known for his theater roles, such portrayal of "Billy" in the Broadway, Chicago, and National Tour productions of Billy Elliot the Musical, as well as his performances as "Race" and "Davey" in the Broadway production of Newsies the Musical. He also starred as Alfie in fourth season of the Canadian television series The Next Step, and as Michael Fiorelli in the 2020 film Ode to Passion.

== Career ==
Bausilio began his professional career performing in multiple operas and ballets at the Bern Theatre and Theater im Kafigturm in his hometown of Bern, Switzerland.

After placing third in a dance competition, Bausilio was invited to audition for the part of "Billy" in Billy Elliot the Musical. After the audition he was cast in the Chicago production of the show along with Cesar Corrales, Tommy Batchelor and J.P. Viernes. He remained with the production through October 10, 2010, at which time he joined the National Tour production of the show, where he shared the title role alongside Michael Dameski, Kylend Hetherington, Lex Ishimoto, and Daniel Patrick Russell.

In May 2011, Bausilio was announced as the next "Billy" in the Broadway production of Billy Elliot the Musical replacing the departing Jacob Clemente. Bausilio made his Broadway Debut that July, and remained with the show through November 6, 2011. Bausilio began performances as "Race" in Newsies on October 7, 2013. Giuseppe starred as Alfie in season four of the Canadian drama television series The Next Step.

He recently starred in the lead role of Michael Fiorelli in the independent musical feature film Ode to Passion, which was released exclusively on Amazon Prime Video on July 10, 2020.

== Stage ==
Date	Production	Role	Theatre	Note
2006	Falstaff	Little Devil	Bern Theatre	Bern, Switzerland
2007	Mazepa	Boy	Bern Theatre	Bern, Switzerland
2007	Sleeping Beauty	The Wolf	Bern Theatre	Bern, Switzerland
2008	Alice in Wonderland	The Rabbit	Theater im Kafigturm	Bern, Switzerland
2008	The Nutcracker	Fritz	Bern Theatre	Bern, Switzerland
April 3, 2010– October 10, 2010	Billy Elliot: The Musical	Billy	Oriental Theatre	Chicago, Illinois
October 30, 2010– June 9, 2011	Billy Elliot: The Musical	Billy	Various Theatres	National Tour
July 3, 2011– November 6, 2011	Billy Elliot: The Musical	Billy	Imperial Theatre	Broadway
October 8, 2012– November 4, 2012	Spring Awakening	Melchior	TBG Theatre	New York City
October 7, 2013– December 1, 2013, June 3, 2014 – August 22, 2014	Newsies the Musical	Race u/s Davey	Nederlander Theatre	Broadway
December, 2015– April 03, 2016	Aladdin	Ensemble	New Amsterdam Theatre	Broadway
July 31, 2016– January 29, 2017	Cats	Carbucketty	Neil Simon Theatre	Broadway
March 15, 2017– April 08, 2018	Hello, Dolly!	Ensemble	Shubert Theatre	Broadway
May 2018 – January 20, 2019	Hamilton	Samuel Seabury/Ensemble	CIBC Theatre	Chicago, Illinois
June, 2019– August, 2022	Hamilton	Charles Lee/Ensemble	Richard Rodgers Theatre	Broadway
October 2024- July 2025	Sunset Boulevard	Swing u/s Artie	St. James Theatre	Broadway

== Filmography ==
Film and television roles
Year	Title	Role	Notes
2011	First Position	Self	Documentary film
2013	Dead Man Down	Teen with Sun Glasses	Film
2016–2017, 2019	The Next Step	Alfie	Main role (season 4); guest role (season 7)
2020	Ode to Passion	Michael Fiorelli	Streaming film

== Awards ==
- Jazz Competition Bern, CH 1st Place
- Ravenna Youth America Grand Prix World Ballet Competition 2nd Place (2008)
- Youth America Grand Prix (World Dance Competition) 3rd Place (2009)
- Concour Le Chausson (Paris Dance Competition), 1st Place (2009)
- MAB, Maria Antonietta Berlusconi International Ballet Award, 1st Place (2010), Milano Teatro Manzoni
- New York Final Youth American Grand Prix World Ballet Competition 3rd Place (2011)
- Youth America Grand Prix (World Dance Competition) 3rd Place (2011)
- Youth America Grand Prix (World Dance Competition) 2nd Place (2012)
- Competition in "LES CHAUSSON D’OR" 2nd Place (2012) (Paris, FR)
