= Nadine Bommer =

American-Israeli choreographer

Nadine Bommer (Hebrew: נדין בומר; born 1968 in New York City, New York) is an American-Israeli contemporary dance choreographer, teacher, and artistic director. She is the founder and artistic director of the internationally renowned Nadine Bommer Dance Company.

== Early life and training ==
Born in New York City, Nadine Bommer spent most of her childhood in Rishon LeZion, Israel. During her childhood, she began creating dance productions and shows. Following her amateur productions for family, friends, and neighbors, Bommer was invited to head the student production at her school when she was 11 years old, and then again in junior high and high school. She received a scholarship from the mayor for her work as a child choreographer/director, and was invited to teach dance to a local group of students following the show produced in her junior year of high school. Intermittently throughout her childhood, Bommer traveled to NYC with her mother, studying dance at the American Ballet Theatre School and Alvin Ailey American Dance Theater School while there. As a young adult, Bommer focused on teaching dance. At the age of 21, she opened the first in a series of dance studios in Israel. With her established school and developing choreography, Bommer began to codify the technique and artistic philosophy that now sustains her career and choreographic work.

== Career ==
Bommer began her career as an educator, opening her first dance studio, Ketzev Hagoof, in 1990. Ketzev Hagoof still teaches dance to children throughout Israel, offering classes at their original location and multiple branches throughout the country. In 1994, Bommer shifted her focus, opening another school called the Nadine Bommer Dance Academy. This school of contemporary dance focuses on preparing students for professional careers in dance and classes are based in Bommer's technique the Nadine Bommer Method (see technique section). Nadine Bommer Dance Academy is currently the flagship location offering this technique to aspiring professional dancers.

In 1997 Bommer established her dance company, beginning performances of work inspired by the early stages of her method. As she continued to make work, Bommer codified her technique, working through stages focused on classical technique (Nevet), improvisation (Kinetica), and characterization (Animato). The final stage of the method, Animato, was completed in 2006, leading to a new phase of the company centered in comedic narrative dance works. In 2007, Bommer began receiving sustained support from the Israeli Ministry of Science, Culture & Sports. This year also marked the premiere of her landmark work Manimation which received great acclaim as Bommer's first work fully utilizing the Nadine Bommer Method.

Following Manimation, Bommer choreographed three new full-length works in quick succession, American Cinema, Invisi'BALL, and Poodle It. Her humorous depiction of a soccer championship in Invisi'BALL rose to international acclaim, leading the company to tours all over the world. In tandem with this success, Bommer's teenage daughter Gaya Bommer-Yemini received prominence in the award-winning documentary First Position. The film featured Bommer's choreography as her daughter won many prizes while performing it around the world.

== Return to New York ==
In 2015 Bommer was invited to present work in New York City after an anonymous donor sponsored her relocation. At this time the company took on a cross-continental structure, working with dancers based in both NYC and Israel. In NYC, Bommer began working with a new group of dancers, teaching them the Nadine Bommer Method and mounting her international sensation Invisi'BALL for its NYC premiere.

After only a few months with this new company structure, Bommer began creating her newest work SEPIA. The piece departs from Bommer's signature comedic tone, for a more dramatic work centered around powerfully evolving sea creature characters. SEPIA premiered at the Suzanne Dellal Center for Dance and Theater in 2016, and has since been presented in an immersive adaptation in NYC. In addition to this work, the company continues to tour internationally, with repertory out of NYC and Israel, most recently visiting South Korea, Russia, and Poland. In the US, Bommer has shared her work at Jacob's Pillow on Broadway at The New Victory Theater, and at Battery Dance Festival. Currently the company is a residency artist at Lehman College through the CUNY Dance Initiative, and Bommer continues to spread her contemporary dance technique throughout the world with her choreography, cross continental company, and educational programming in both NYC and Israel.

== Technique ==
Bommer's work as a choreographer and educator centers around her technique The Nadine Bommer Method. This improvisational method is inspired by the endless motion of the sea and split into two core principles: The Body (Kinetica) and The Character (Animato). Kinetica gives dancers a step-by-step process to create a uniquely personal movement language. It cultivates full control of fluid, malleable, and expansive movement using kinetic energy and internal listening. In Bommer's character work (Animato) this liquidity is used to develop a new, but equally expressive, physicality dependent upon the dancer's belief in their transformation to a new being. Characterization in her choreographic work has ranged from soccer players to marionettes to inanimate objects like a lamp and more.

A third branch of the technique, Nevet, brings this method to classical technique, focusing an inward attention to the structure of ballet. Nevet was the initial iteration of the method codified in 1994, and is still used as an anchoring entry point in the process of pairing the imagination and internal listening with the body. The full method is taught in Bommer's school, Nadine Bommer Dance Academy, as well as 15 dance schools across Israel including Kibbutzim College of Education Dance Theatre. The company also offers a training program for professional dancers in both NYC and Israel.

== Repertoire ==
Manimation (2007) - Manimation presents a cartoon depiction of comedic situations in a coffee shop. With music by Meredith Monk, the stage transforms into a colorful, Cartoon-like world, where a new experience of dance is created.

American Cinema (2009) - American Cinema is a theatrical dance comedy exploring the nuances of cinematic experience through diverse characters in two parts. In part one marionettes react to a film through their operator's point of view. Later, in part two, people translate the puppets' responses into human reactions, offering a second depiction of the emotions brought out in the movie going experience.

Invisi'BALL (2010) - Invisi’BALL transforms a cast of female dancers into two teams of ultra-competitive male soccer players. With popular chants and roaring crowds, this unique theater-dance piece illustrates a surprising, hilarious, and multi-cultural mash-up of the game from the moment the audience arrives at the theater.

Poodle It (2013) - The glory days of a barber shop come back to life in the memories of a Poodles Barber who has fallen from grace. On stage a mix of animal, inanimate and human characters, to tell his story in an innovative, humorous and fascinating dance theater work.

SEPIA (2016) - Sepia is a 60-minute contemporary dance work depicting imaginatively evolved creatures who merge the past, present, and future with their powerful presence. Journeying through a world of their own creation, these creatures display a feminine strength, ability to change, and inherent danger through the signature Nadine Bommer movement language.

Other works: Shorties, Field Trip

== Awards ==
2011: "Cartoon Girl" - 1st prize, contemporary performance, Youth America Grand Prix

2010: "American Cinema" – 1st prize, Florence Dance Festival of Tuscany, Italy

2010: "Manimation" - 1st prize, ' The Audience's Choice' at "no ballet" competition, Ludwigshafen, Germany

2010: "Wild Horses" - 3rd prize, modern performance, Youth America Grand Prix

2007: "Bus Stop" and "Gospel" - 1st prize, Florence Dance Festival of Tuscany, Italy

2000-2004: 1st prize, Florence Dance Festival of Tuscany, Italy

1996-1999: 1st and 2nd prize, choreography and performance, Freiburg Festival, Germany

== Personal life ==
Bommer lives with her husband Ziv Yemini and their two sons. Their daughter Gaya Bommer-Yemini is a professional dancer, Youth America Grand Prix winner, and featured artist in Bess Kargman's award-winning documentary First Position.
