= Ode to Passion =

- Poster
- Directed by: Jack Danini
- Written by: Jack Danini
- Produced by: Jack Danini; Carey Rothman
- Starring: Giuseppe Bausilio; Julia Nightingale; Jeff Smith; Victoria Meade; Kaylor Otwell; Marcus Harmon; Al Pagano
- Cinematography: Darren Joe
- Edited by: Jack Danini; Martin Apelbaum
- Music by: Jack Danini; Yoo Soo Kim
- Production company: Jack Danini Productions
- Distributed by: Jack Danini Productions
- Release dates: March 21, 2020 (Queens World Film Festival); July 10, 2020 (Amazon Prime Video)
- Running time: 128 minutes
- Country: United States
- Language: English

Ode to Passion is a 2020 American musical romantic drama film starring Giuseppe Bausilio, Julia Nightingale, Jeff Smith and Victoria Meade. The film was written and directed by Jack Danini in his feature directorial debut.

The film was scheduled to premiere at the 2020 Queens World Film Festival. Due to the COVID-19 pandemic, the festival happened virtually, with the film absent from the screenings. It premiered on Amazon Prime Video on July 10, 2020.

== Plot ==
In New York City, a young writer's resolute belief in true love is put to the test by a beautiful girl and her struggle with addiction.

== Cast ==
- Giuseppe Bausilio as Michael Fiorelli
- Julia Nightingale as Sarah Andrews
- Jeff Smith as John G. Leroux
- Victoria Meade as Alexa Lynn
- Kaylor Otwell as Kate Johnson
- Marcus Harmon as Richy Sanders
- Al Pagano as Father Conor
- Elijah Noll as Lead Singer of Bar Band
- Al Nazemian as Robert
- Keaton Eckhoff as Tim High

Director Jack Danini makes a cameo as one of the friends John, Richi and Father Conor play poker with.

== Production ==
=== Development ===
Danini took a unique approach to write all of the film's dialogue in verse, similar to the writings of Goethe's Faust and Arthur Rimbaud, to complement the film's pace and create a "constant melodic rhythm".

=== Pre-production and filming ===
Casting the film and the recording sessions of the songs took place three months into 2017. It was shot entirely on location in New York City throughout October of that year.

=== Music ===
The film's musical numbers were written by Jack Danini and produced by Yoo Soo Kim, who also scored the film. The soundtrack was made available for pre-order on iTunes on June 20, 2020 and was released on July 3, 2020, a week before the film's release. An additional song, "Crying When a Train Goes By," was shot but cut from the final film. However, it was included as a bonus track on the soundtrack and the actual scene can be viewed as a bonus clip with the film on Amazon Prime Video.

==== Musical numbers ====
- "I Met a Girl" – Michael, Sarah, John and Alexa
- "Past Relationships" – Michael and Sarah
- "Trouble" – Richy and John
- "Baby, There You Are!/Passion, Passion" – Sarah and Michael
- "The Morning After" – Sarah and Michael
- "It's Real" – Michael and Sarah
- "Tonight Is Ours" – Alexa
- "Afraid of Love" – John, Alexa, Michael, Sarah, Kate and Richy
- "Dreams Aside" – John and Michael
- "Girl of My Dreams" – Michael and Sarah
- "Living In Your Dreams" – John
- "You're The Lucky One" – Michael and John
- "What's It All About, Charlie?" – Lead Singer of Bar Band
- "Are You Fucking High Again!" – Michael and Sarah
- "Kate's Dreams" – John and Kate
- "All The Things You Wanted" – John
- "You're Gone" – Michael
- "Dear Lord" – Michael

== Release ==
Ode to Passion was scheduled to premiere at the Queens World Film Festival on March 21, 2020. Due to the COVID-19 pandemic, the festival happened virtually, with the film absent from the screenings. The screenplay was nominated for Best Screenplay, and Julia Nightingale was nominated for Best Actress at the festival.

It was released exclusively on Amazon Prime Video on July 10, 2020 with other platforms to follow later in the summer. It was released in 4K on Vimeo on July 24, 2020.

The film then held a private physical screening at the AMC Edinburg 18 in Edinburg, Texas on October 4, 2020, which was attended by Danini and his personal friends and family.

It screened virtually at the 27th Annual CineSol Film Festival on December 20, 2020 and won Best Feature.

== Reception ==
The film received mixed reviews, with critics praising the cinematography, performances, directing and writing. On the review aggregator website Rotten Tomatoes, 40% of 5 critics' reviews are positive, with an average rating of 5.0/10. Film critic Jackie K. Cooper wrote a positive review of the film, saying "Jack Danini has created the best love movie of the year. Ode to Passion is quirky and original, full of love and romance. It is a musical full of lyrical cuplets between the songs."

Peter Debruge of Variety was also positive about the film, writing "Allegedly 20 years in the making, Ode to Passion is simultaneously a celebration of love at first sight and a more jaded look at the way relationships play out. It’s not as ingenious as Jason Robert Brown’s The Last Five Years, which set its core couple moving in opposite directions. But Ode is ultimately deeper and wiser than its instant-infatuation opening suggests. Embrace the cheese and writer-director Jack Danini’s indie rock musical — set in New York and written entirely in verse — just might win you over."

Taryn Smith of Picture This Post praised the cinematography, saying that it "helps bring all the scenes to life by showing us the many sides of the city—from the colorful, fun night life to the dingy subway. The sweeping motions of the camera also serve to heighten our response. We are as dizzy, caught up and intoxicated by Sarah and Michael’s new love as they are. We also are dragged to the lowest of lows in scenes with stark lighting contrasts as their relationship suffers its many downs."

Alan Ng of Film Threat was mixed about the film, saying "There is just as much right going for the film as there is wrong and, sadly, Ode to Passion falls short of being something special. Jack Danini, though, has the makings of becoming a great director and also has a good sense of story, which is vital to directing."
