= Kang Sue-jin =

South Korean ballerina (born 1967)

- Hangul: 강수진
- RR: Gang Sujin
- MR: Kang Sujin

Kang Sue-jin (Korean pronunciation: [kaŋ sʰudʑin]; born 24 April 1967) is a South Korean ballerina. She is a principal dancer at Stuttgart Ballet.

== Early life ==
Kang Sue-jin was born in Seoul, South Korea. After initial ballet lessons at Sun Hwa Arts Middle School, where she majored in Korean traditional dance, she continued her education at Sun Hwa Arts High School until 1982. Following graduation from high school, Kang went to Marika Besobrasova at Monte Carlo Dance School. In 1986, she became a member of the Stuttgart Ballet, where she was appointed Soloist in 1994 and Principal Dancer in 1997.

Following her long career as a ballet dancer, Kang was awarded an honorary degree from Sookmyung Women's University in 2016.

== Career ==
Kang joined Stuttgart Ballet in 1986 and was its first and youngest Asian ballerina.

In 2002, Kang appeared in Die Kameliendame and two years later, she performed with Benito Marcellino in Cranko's Onegin. Following the 2016 performance of the same ballet with Jason Reilly as partner, Kang had retired from performance.

In 2003, Kang debuted in USA in a role of Juliet from Cranko's Romeo and Juliet opposite to Romeo role by Filip Barankiewicz. In 2008, Kang reprised the role of Juliet in the same ballet.

In 2013, Kang published her first memoir titled I Don't Wait for Tomorrow. The same year she also became an honorary ambassador of PyeongChang at the 2018 Winter Olympics.

In 2015, Kang performed in John Neumeier's Die Kameliendame in her hometown Seoul, South Korea and the same year appeared in Cranco's Onegin at Seoul Arts Center where she sang the "Swan song".

In 2017, Kang became a jury member of the Prix de Lausanne, Prix Benois de la Danse. and of the Beijing International Ballet and Choreography Competition.

== Featured performances ==
- 1992 Mata Hari
- 1992 Romeo and Juliet
- 1993 The Magic Flute
- 1994 The Sleeping Beauty
- 1996 Giselle
- 1997 The Hunchback of Notre Dame
- 1998 Die Kameliendame
- 1999 Gala performance - Korea's best Ballerina
- 2006 Korean Nat'l Ballet, 2006 New Year's Gala
- 2008 Appeared at Lotte Dept. Store CF.
- 2016 The Lady and the Fool

== Honours and awards ==
- Won a scholarship of Prix de Lausanne in 1985
- Recipient of the Korean Young Artist Award, 1998
- Recipient of the Best Female Ballerina Award at the Prix Benois de la Danse, 1999
- National Hwa-Gwan Order of Cultural Merit by the Ministry of Culture, Sports and Tourism (South Korea), 1999
- Ho-Am Prize in the Arts, 2001
- Recipient of the German title "Kammertänzerin" (German: Royal Court Dancer), 2007
- Recipient of the John Cranko Award, 2007
- Order of Merit of Baden-Württemberg, 2014
- Order of Cultural Merit, 2018

In 1998, German Orchid Society named an orchid from the Phalaenopsis genus in her honor.

== See also ==
- Stuttgart Ballet
