= Larissa Saveliev =

Russian dancer

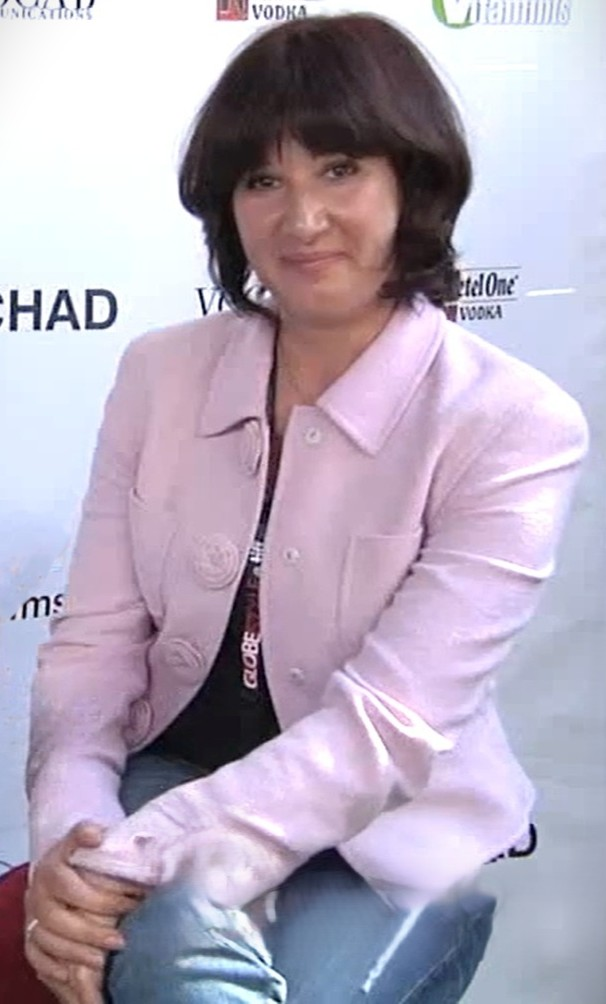
- Saveliev in 2011
- Born: March 29, 1969; Moscow, Russia
- Occupation: YAGP founder
- Spouse: Gennadi Saveliev
- Awards: Dance Magazine Award, Russian-American Person of the Year according to Russian-American Fund

Larissa Saveliev (Russian: Лари́са Саве́льева) is a former Bolshoi Ballet dancer and the Founder and Artistic Director of YAGP, – the world's largest student ballet scholarship competition. She is also a producer of various performing arts events in the U.S. and around the world.

== Early career ==
Larissa Saveliev was born in Moscow on March 29, 1969 in the family of college professors. She was trained at the Bolshoi Ballet Academy and, upon graduating, joined the Stanislavsky Ballet. Several years later, she joined the Bolshoi Ballet, under the artistic direction of Yuri Grigorovich.

Saveliev emigrated to the United States in 1994. She went on to perform with the Los Angeles Classical Ballet, New Jersey Ballet, and Tulsa Ballet. At the same time, she discovered a passion for teaching. It was while she was a ballet teacher at Robin Horneff Performing Arts Center in New Jersey that she developed the idea of creating Youth America Grand Prix.

== Founding YAGP ==
While pursuing her teaching career in the United States, Saveliev wanted to showcase the progress of her students and learn from other teachers in the area. She was hoping to find a ballet version of the jazz dance competitions that were very popular at the time, yet there were no ballet competitions for students in the U.S. In 1999, together with her husband Gennadi Saveliev (then a soloist with American Ballet Theatre) she decided to create one – and founded Youth America Grand Prix (YAGP).

YAGP became America's first ballet scholarship competition for students. Its mission was not only to showcase talented young dancers, but also to create opportunities for their further development. The YAGP team would conduct auditions throughout the United States and the world, select the most promising young dancers and invite them to the annual Finals in New York City. YAGP would then invite directors of leading dance academies to serve as the jury members, who would present scholarships to their schools as the prizes of the competition.

YAGP was the first competition to introduce the concept that a student does not have to win 1st, 2nd or 3rd place to receive the prize (scholarship). Scholarships at YAGP are awarded based on each individual school director's evaluation of a student's potential, independently of the jury panel's decision. This concept has now been widely adopted by many other ballet competitions around the world.

By YAGP's 20th Anniversary in 2019, more than $3 million in scholarships has been awarded at YAGP to the world's leading dance academies, with over 350 YAGP alumni performing in more than 80 dance companies around the globe.

== Awards and recognition ==
- In 2014 Larissa Saveliev became the recipient of the Dance Magazine Award.
- Also in 2014 she received the Russian-American Person of the Year Award in the category Educator of the Year.
- In 2015 she was recognized by the Society of Foreign Consuls of New York for her Outstanding Achievement and Contribution to Community Improvement.
- In 2017 Larissa Saveliev was recognized as one of the top 25 most influential people in dance by Dance Magazine.

== Other projects ==
Saveliev is also a producer and consultant for various performing arts and television projects.

- In 2007, together with Sergey Gordeev, she co-produced Lukoil’s 15th Anniversary Celebration at Carnegie Hall, featuring the Fedoseyev Symphony Orchestra and Denis Matsuev.
- She was involved in casting and story development of First Position – a highly acclaimed 2011 documentary feature film following 6 YAGP participants to the Finals in New York City.
- In 2014 Saveliev served as a consulting producer for Breaking Pointe, an CW reality TV series featuring Ballet West.
- In 2014, in partnership with Lawrence Bender, Nigel Lythgoe, Kevin Brown and Alex Reznik, she served as Executive Producer for Dance School Diaries, a reality web TV series. She currently serves as an artistic consultant for many ballet galas around the world.
- Saveliev is a member of the Advisory Board of Dance Magazine.

== Personal life ==
Larissa Saveliev lives in New Jersey with her husband, Gennadi Saveliev. She has two sons, Alex and Eugene.
