= Marika Besobrasova =

Russian-Monegasque dancer

- Born: 4 August 1918; Yalta, Russian Empire
- Died: 25 April 2010 (aged 91); Monte Carlo, Monaco
- Occupations: Dancer, ballet teacher
- Known for: Founder of the Princess Grace Classic Dance Academy
- Spouse: Roger-Felix Médecin

Marika Besobrasova (Russian: Мари́ка Безобра́зова, romanized: Maríka Bezobrázova; 4 August 1918 – 25 April 2010) was a Monegasque dancer and ballet teacher of Russian origin. She was a founder and a head of Princess Grace Classic Dance Academy in Monte Carlo.

== Early life ==
Marika Besobrasova was born on 4 August 1918 in Yalta. Her family originally was from Saint Petersburg. Her grandfather was a general in command of Tsar Nicholas II’s guards and her grandmother was a lady-in-waiting to the Czar’s mother, Maria Feodorovna. Besobrasova’s father fought in the White Army before having to escape with his family to Europe. Besobrasova was two years old when the family left for Europe. Their first stop was in Constantinople. There the family stayed on the pier for forty days, which resulted Besobrasova in getting double pneumonia and double pleurisy and the followed operation. After leaving Constantinople, the family stopped briefly in Venice, and traveled further first settling in Denmark. As the climate was difficult there, they decided to leave for the south of France. From the age of nine Besobrasova attended Russian Lyceum in Nice.

Besobrasova was married to Roger-Felix Médecin.

Marika Besobrasova died on 24 April 2010 in a Monte Carlo hospital, at the age of 91.

== Career ==
At the age of 12, she received her first ballet classes from Julia Sedova in Nice. The years later, at fifteen, she started her professional career with the opera ballet in Monte Carlo. In 1935, at the age of 17, she was noticed by the impresario René Blum and became part of the “Ballet Russe de Monte Carlo” directed by Michael Fokine. Besobrasova spoke about Fokine as of the first genius she met.

In 1940 she founded the Ballet de Cannes de Marika Besobrasova. Between 1947 and 1949 Besobrasova was the titular teacher of the Marquis de Cuevas Ballet, and went to the Ballet des Champs Elysées where she remained until 1951.

In 1952, she set up her own school in Monte Carlo called “Monte Carlo Classic Dance School”. Even though training background of the school was based on Russian methods, the school program suggested universal professional education. During the 1960s, Besobrasova developed a teaching system consisting of eleven-year program. Based on Agrippina Vaganova’s syllabus with heavy influence of French school, the program is now used by dance teachers in several countries.

From 1966, in addition to her school in Monte Carlo, Besobrasova headed the school of the Ballet and the Opera in Zurich and the Ballet of the Opera in Rome. She was in great demand as an educator throughout Europe and from 1970 worked in close collaboration with the Stuttgart Ballet. In 1971 Besobrasova staged Rudolf Nureyev’s Paquita for the American Ballet Theatre in New York City. For many years she was a member of the Migros Culture Percentage Scholarship jury, as well as a frequent member of the jury at international dance competitions.

In 1974, Prince Rainier granted Besobrasova a villa Casa Mia in Monte Carlo, in which her dance academy was housed since then. The next year, in 1975, Besobrasova’s school was renamed to Princess Grace Classical Dance Academy. As royal family provided the facility for the Besobrasova’s ballet school, in some sources Grace Kelly, otherwise known as Princess Grace of Monaco, is named as a founder of the school. Besobrasova remained the head of the school for thirty-four years until her death.

Among Besobrasova’s outstanding students should be mentioned Princess Caroline of Monaco, South Korean ballet dancer Kang Sue-jin, Irish dancer and artistic director of Irish National Youth Ballet Katherine Lewis, French actress Nathalie Baye, Irish ballet dancer Jane Magain, choreographer and artistic director of the Béjart Ballet Lausanne Gil Roman, dancer and director of the Sydney Opera Ballet Maina Gielgud, choreographer and director of Aterballetto Amedeo Amodio, director of the Balletto di Puglia Toni Candeloro, director of the Ballet de Teatres de Valencia Immaculate Gil Lázaro, Roland Petit's soloist dancer Francesca Sposi and others.
