= Magali Messac =

French-American ballet dancer

Magali Messac, a French-American ballet dancer, was born and raised in the south of France, where she received her early training from Olga and Henry Taneeff.

In 1969, she joined the Hamburg Ballet, and four years later, was promoted to principal dancer. That year, she received the Oberdorfer Culture Award for the most talented young artist. In 1978, she came to the United States as a principal dancer for the Pennsylvania Ballet, and in 1980, was invited by Mikhail Baryshnikov to join American Ballet Theatre as one of their principal ballerinas. Messac finished her performing career in Seattle with the Pacific Northwest Ballet.

Throughout her career she danced the major roles of the classical repertoire. She was also admired for her strength and beauty in contemporary works, including a wide selection of ballets by George Balanchine, and Antony Tudor. Original ballets were created for her by a number of choreographers, including Mikhail Baryshnikov, Twyla Tharp, John Neumeier, Marcel Marceau, Martine van Hamel, and Glen Tetley. She studied with many important teachers, but Maggie Black, who trained and privately coached her in New York, was her greatest influence.

Messac currently lives in Seattle, Washington, where, for many years, she was on the faculty of Cornish College of the Arts. She also taught advanced ballet classes for Spectrum Dance Company. She was a permanent faculty member for the American Ballet Theater's summer intensive.

Messac recently gained prominence as the 'magical ballerina' in the life story of Michaela DePrince's Taking Flight: From War Orphan to Star Ballerina.
