= Keystone School Online =

Private online K–12 school based in Herndon, Virginia

The Keystone School Online

Location
- Reston, Virginia; 38.9555817°N 77.3553051°W

Information
- School type: For-profit private online K–12 school
- Administrator: Stride, Inc.
- Grades: K–12
- Campus type: Online
- Website: keystoneschoolonline.com

The Keystone School Online is a private online K–12 school operated by Stride, Inc., a for-profit education company headquartered in Reston, Virginia, United States.

With Credit Recover offerings, students can earn their high school diploma at Keystone or take courses to supplement another high school or homeschool program. The school's first courses were introduced in 1974 as part of the Learning and Evaluation Center. Keystone took its current name and became a major part of the homeschool market in 1994. Over 200,000 have enrolled in Keystone's educational programs. The current enrollment is 10,000+ students.

K12 Inc. (now named Stride Inc.) acquired Keystone in 2010.

== Notable alumni ==
- Michaela DePrince, ballerina for the Dutch National Ballet
- Takanyi Garanganga, tennis player
- Maria Sharapova, Russian tennis player
