= Michaela DePrince =

Sierra Leonean–American ballet dancer (1995–2024)

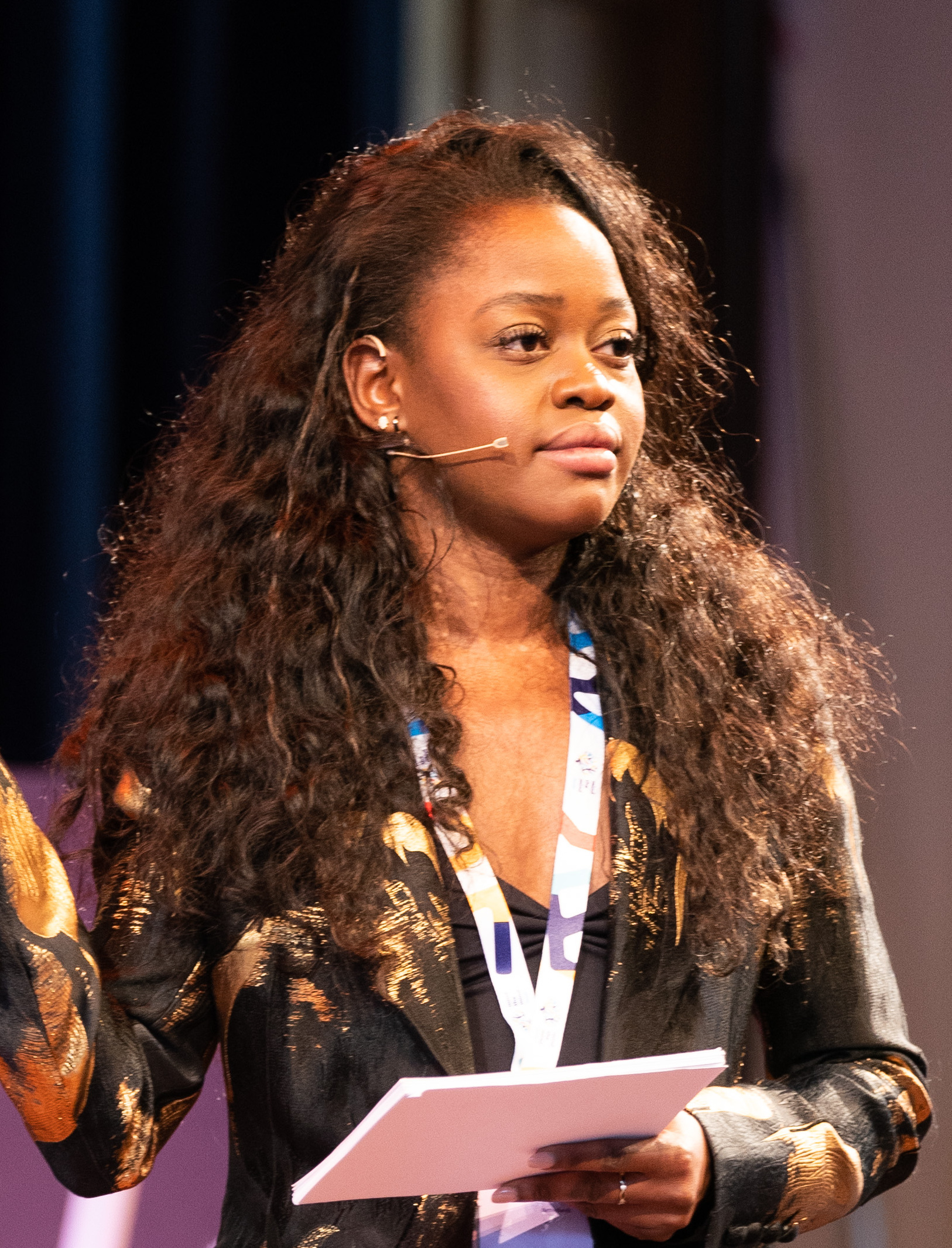
- DePrince in 2019
- Born: Mabinty Bangura; January 6, 1995; Kenema, Sierra Leone
- Died: September 10, 2024 (aged 29); New York City, U.S.
- Education: Keystone National High School; The Rock School for Dance Education; Jacqueline Kennedy Onassis School
- Occupation: Ballet dancer
- Years active: 2010–2024
- Dancing career
- Former groups: Boston Ballet; Dance Theatre of Harlem; Dutch National Ballet

Michaela Mabinty DePrince (born Mabinty Bangura; January 6, 1995 – September 10, 2024) was a Sierra Leonean–American ballet dancer who danced with the Boston Ballet, the Dance Theatre of Harlem, and the Dutch National Ballet.

DePrince rose to fame after starring in the documentary First Position in 2011, which followed her and other young ballet dancers as they prepared to compete at the Youth America Grand Prix, where she won a scholarship to the Jacqueline Kennedy Onassis School at American Ballet Theatre. In 2012, DePrince danced with the Dance Theatre of Harlem as the youngest dancer in the history of the company. From 2013 to 2020, she was with the Dutch National Ballet.

With her adoptive mother, Elaine DePrince, she authored the 2014 book Taking Flight: From War Orphan to Star Ballerina (also published as Hope in a Ballet Shoe). From 2016 to 2024, she was a goodwill ambassador with the Amsterdam-based organization War Child. She died aged 29.

== Early life ==
Born as Mabinty Bangura on January 6, 1995, into a Muslim family in Kenema, Sierra Leone, she grew up as an orphan after her uncle brought her to an orphanage during the civil war. Her adoptive parents were told that her father was shot and killed by the Revolutionary United Front when she was three years old and that her mother starved to death soon after.

Frequently malnourished, mistreated, and derided as a "devil's child" because of vitiligo, a skin condition causing depigmentation, she fled to a refugee camp after her orphanage was bombed.

In 1999, at the age of four, she and another girl, also named Mabinty, were adopted by Elaine and Charles DePrince, a couple from Cherry Hill, New Jersey, and taken to the United States. She was given the new name Michaela Mabinty DePrince, named after Michael, an adopted son of the DePrinces who had died of AIDS during the hemophilia blood product contamination crisis. The DePrinces raised 11 children, including Michaela, nine of whom were adopted.

== Career ==
=== Training ===
Inspired by a magazine cover of a ballerina, Magali Messac that she found outside the orphanage gates and kept while in Sierra Leone, DePrince trained as a ballet dancer in the U.S., performing at the Youth America Grand Prix among other competitions. She trained in classical ballet at The Rock School for Dance Education in Philadelphia, Pennsylvania. Concurrent with intense ballet training, she took online classes through Keystone National High School, where she earned her high school diploma.

DePrince pursued a professional career despite encountering instances of racial discrimination. According to her or her mother, at age eight, she was told that she could not perform as Marie in The Nutcracker because "America's not ready for a Black girl ballerina." Her mother said that a year later a teacher told her that Black dancers were not worth investing money in, because they "end up having big boobs and big hips"; ultimately, DePrince remained petite as she grew older.

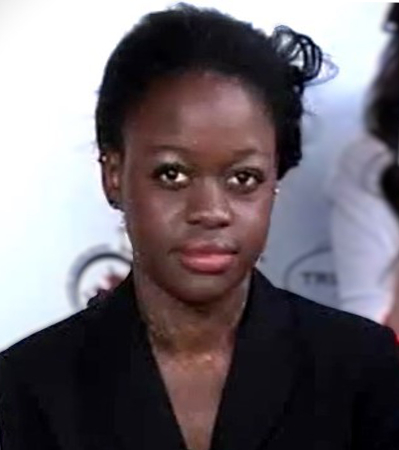
DePrince in 2011

DePrince was one of the stars of the 2011 documentary film First Position, which follows six young dancers vying for a place in an elite ballet company or school at the Youth America Grand Prix. She was awarded a scholarship to study at the American Ballet Theatre's Jacqueline Kennedy Onassis School of Ballet. She also performed on the television program Dancing with the Stars. In 2011, she made her European debut in Abdallah and the Gazelle of Basra with De Dutch Don't Dance Division, a dance company in The Hague, Netherlands. She returned a year later to dance the Sugar Plum Fairy in Tchaikovsky's The Nutcracker at the Lucent Dance Theatre.

In 2012, DePrince graduated from the American Ballet Theatre's Jacqueline Kennedy Onassis School in New York City, and joined the Dance Theatre of Harlem, where she was the youngest member of the company. Her professional debut performance was in the role of Gulnare in Mzansi Productions and the South African Ballet Theatre's premiere of Le Corsaire on July 19, 2012.

=== Dutch National Ballet ===
In July 2013, she joined the junior company of the Dutch National Ballet, based in Amsterdam. In August 2014, she joined the Dutch National Ballet as an éleve (student). In 2015, she was promoted to the rank of coryphée. In 2016 she was promoted to the rank of grand sujet, and then to soloist at the end of the same year. When she first joined the Dutch National Ballet, she was the only dancer of African origin. In 2016, she performed in the "Hope" sequence of Beyoncé's Lemonade.

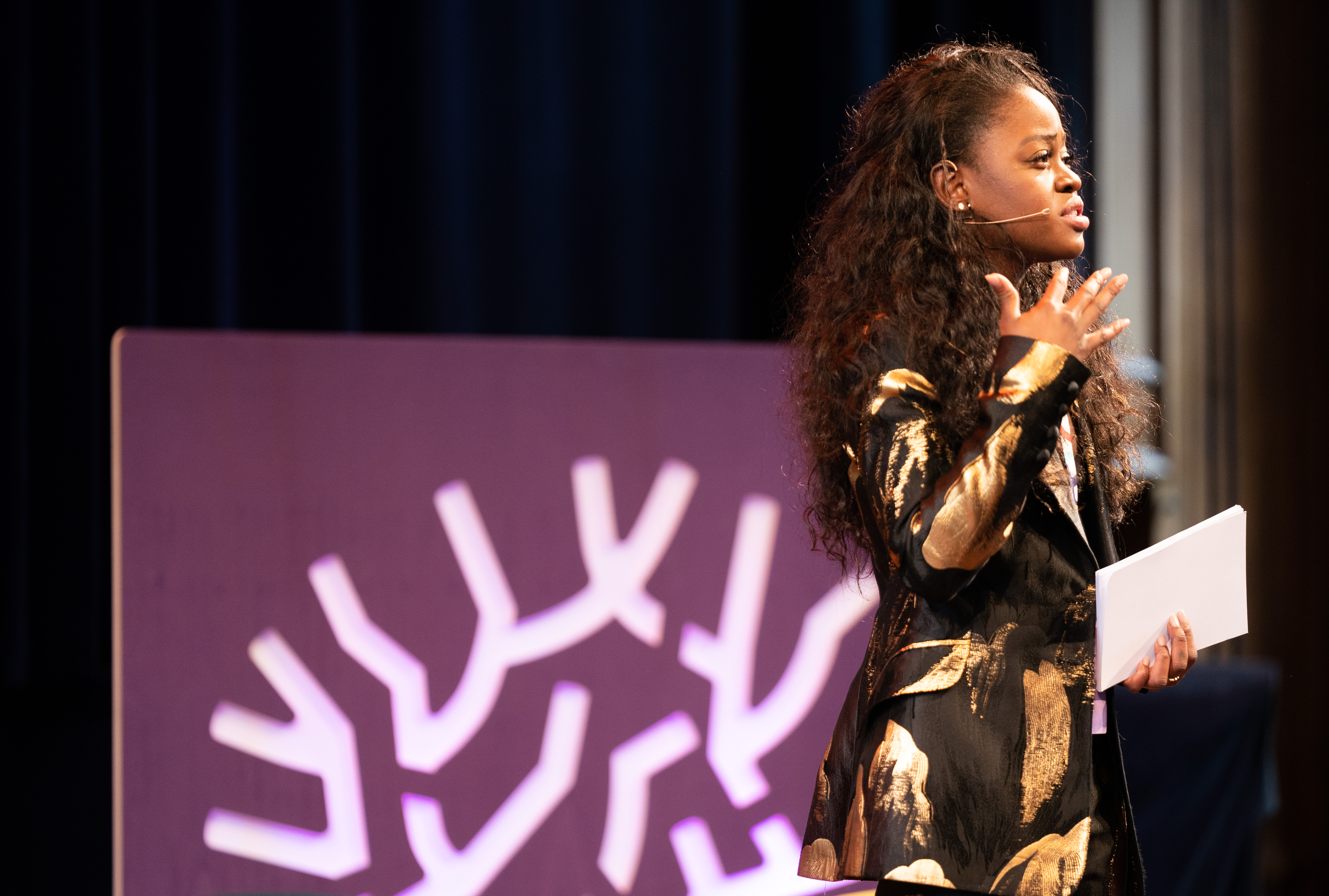
DePrince in 2019

DePrince cited Lauren Anderson, one of the first Black American principal ballerinas, as her role model. In 2015, MGM acquired the film rights to DePrince's book Taking Flight: From War Orphan to Star Ballerina. In 2018, MGM announced that Madonna would direct Taking Flight, a biopic on DePrince's life and career.

In 2019, DePrince produced a gala for War Child Holland, which raised more than half a million dollars for children and youth affected by armed conflict. In September 2020, DePrince announced that she was taking a leave of absence from the Dutch National Ballet. She started online coaching sessions with Charla Genn, a faculty member at the Juilliard School.

DePrince danced the leading role in Coppelia, a 2021 ballet film without dialogue that combines live dance with animation. It is a modernized version of a story by E. T. A. Hoffmann.

=== Boston Ballet ===
In 2021, DePrince joined the Boston Ballet as second soloist. She was drawn to the Boston Ballet due to the company having many talented Black dancers, its culture, and its repertoire.

== Personal life and death ==
In 2015, it was reported that DePrince was in a relationship with ballet dancer Skyler Maxey-Wert, whom she also talked about in her book.

When DePrince's adoptive father, Charles DePrince, died in June 2020, she was unable to travel from Amsterdam to Atlanta to say goodbye and be with her family due to COVID-19 travel restrictions, further complicated by unrest due to the murder of George Floyd. In September 2020, she took time off from her career to grieve and deal with her mental health through therapy.

DePrince died of unknown causes in New York City on September 10, 2024, at the age of 29. She died one day before her adoptive mother, Elaine, died from heart failure. Elaine was reportedly not aware that Michaela had died, and Michaela had not known about the sudden decline in her mother's health.
