= Sunhwa Arts School =

High school in Seoul, South Korea

Sunhwa Arts High School
- 선화예술고등학교
- 25 Neung-dong, 664 Cheonhodaero, Gwangjin-gu, Seoul; South Korea

Information
- Type: Private
- Opened: 1977
- Endowment: Unification Church
- Website: sunhwa.org

Sunhwa Arts School
- 선화예술학교

Information
- Opened: 1974
- Grades: Middle school
- Website: sunhwaarts.com

Sunhwa Arts School (Korean: 선화예술고등학교) is a private coeducational college preparatory arts academy located in Seoul, South Korea. Founded as the Little Angels Art School in 1973 by the Reverend Sun Myung Moon (the founder of the Unification Church), the Sunhwa Arts School was launched in 1974 and has been supported by the Sunhwa Educational Foundation since 1977, when this foundation was created by Reverend Moon.

It is considered to be among the most prominent visual arts, music and dance middle schools and high schools in South Korea. The school is known for its high academic standards and requires high entrance examination scores and interviews for acceptance. At the school, students specialize in one art form such as painting and sculpture, musical instruments or classical ballet. The school complex includes the Little Angels Performing Arts Center, home of the Little Angels Children's Folk Ballet of Korea, which also was founded by Moon in 1962.

== Notable alumni ==
- Joo Won Ahn, principal dancer with the American Ballet Theatre
- Jo Su-mi, operatic soprano
- Shin Youngok, a lyric coloratura soprano
- Pak Hoon-sook, the daughter-in-law of Sun Myung Moon and therefore sometimes referred to as Julia H. Moon, who is a ballerina with the Universal Ballet, which is sponsored by the Unification Church.
- Hee Seo, principal dancer with the American Ballet Theatre
- Kang Sue-jin, ballerina with the Stuttgart Ballet group in Germany
- Hwang Jung-eum, actress, majored in dance
- Park Han-byul, actress, graduated from Sunhwa Middle School and then transferred during high school
- Moon Chae-won, actress, majored in Asian painting
- Yang Jin-sung, actress, majored in Art Design
- Mikyung Sung, classical double bassist
- Nada, rapper, majored in traditional painting (dropped out)
- Kam Woo-sung, actor, majored in Asian art, later received a Ph.D. in Asian art at Seoul University. Leading role in the film "King and the Clown."
- Shin Jae-hong, composer and songwriter, notably of several Im Jae Beom songs
- Roh Yoon-seo, actress, best known for roles in “Crash Course in Romance” and “20th Century Girl”, majored in Fine Arts.
