= National Bleeding Disorders Foundation =

Health organization seeking to cure and treat hemophilia

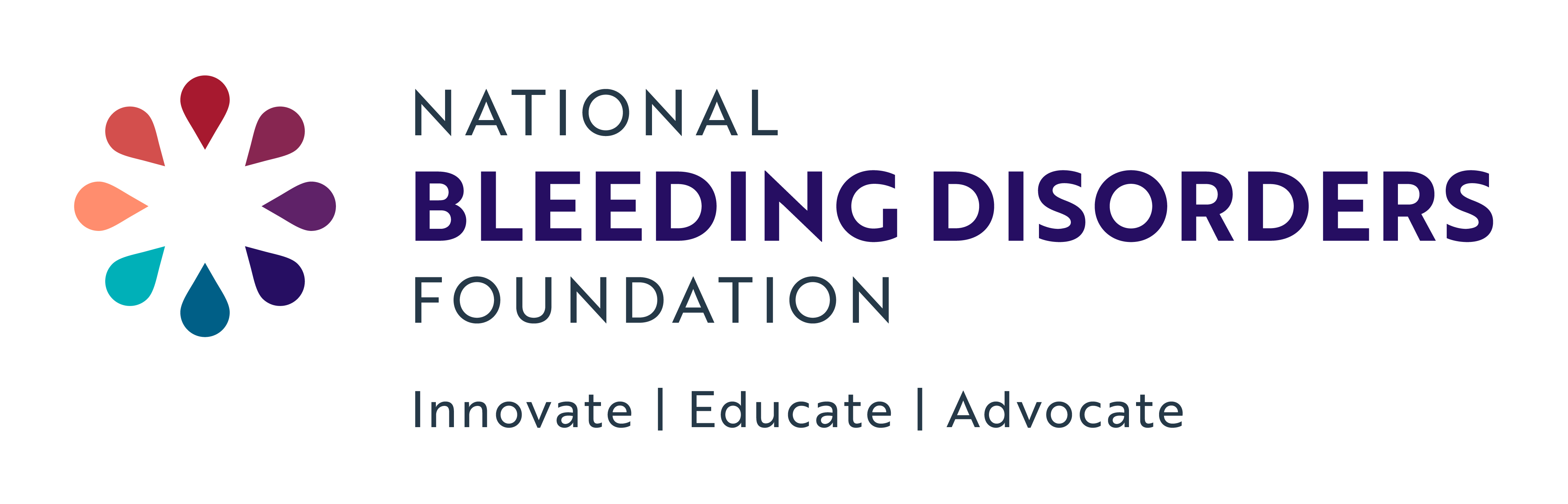
- Founded: 1948; 78 years ago
- Purpose: Awareness, care, and treatment of inheritable blood and bleeding disorders
- Region served: United States
- Method: Hemophilia research, public policy and education
- Key people: Philip M. Gattone M.Ed. President & Chief Executive Officer
- Website: bleeding.org

The National Bleeding Disorders Foundation (NBDF) is a United States patient advocacy organization for the care and treatment of inheritable blood and bleeding disorders such as hemophilia and von Willebrand disease. Founded in 1948, NBDF, then known as the National Hemophilia Foundation, helps secure funding for treatment centers and develops national guidelines for treatment and health care policy. The organization also serves as a central point for information on the disorders.

== History ==
The National Bleeding Disorders Foundation was founded in 1948, as the first national hemophilia advocacy organization in the United States. One of its early initiatives was to secure funding for Comprehensive Hemophilia Diagnostic and Treatment Centers (HTC).

In 1993, the foundation received media coverage of its efforts to hold health care company Baxter International accountable for infecting 10,000 hemophiliac members with AIDS due to HIV contaminated clotting products.

In 1994, the NHF lobbied the FDA's blood products advisory committee (BPAC) to add Parvovirus B19 and Hepatitis A risk warnings to plasma products.

In 1998, the NHF convened the first Women with Bleeding Disorders Task Force, to address the difficulties women had in getting proper treatment.

In 2008, former NHF Board Chair and health advocate Val Bias became the group's CEO.

In 2013, actress and comedian Alex Borstein became the NHF's spokesperson for genetic testing. In October, Borstein hosted the NHF's inaugural "What's So Bloody Funny" comedy fundraiser.

In 2016, the NHF began recognizing March as Bleeding Disorders Awareness Month to raise awareness of hemophilia and von Willebrand disease among stakeholders. Also in 2016, as part of the foundation's awareness efforts, it started the Red Tie Campaign, with the symbol representing blood and the community coming together to help those with inheritable blood and bleeding disorders.

In 2018, the NHF launched an advocacy campaign on Capitol Hill in Washington, DC, where 500 members of the bleeding disorders community met with 300 members of Congress and their staff.

In 2019, CEO Bias retired and was replaced as CEO and president by Leonard Valentino, MD.

In July 2022, the organization petitioned the FDA to require a risk evaluation and mitigation strategy (REMS) to ensure the safety of valoctocogene roxaparvovec and etranacogene dezaparvovec, two gene therapy treatments the FDA was considering for approval for hemophilia treatment.

On August 17, 2023, the organization announced they rebranded to the National Bleeding Disorders Foundation (NBDF) after 75 years. In addition to the new name, the National Bleeding Disorders Foundation unveiled a new visual identity and logo intended to represent a wide range of inheritable blood and bleeding disorders and a new tagline: "Innovate | Educate | Advocate".

In 2024, Len Valentino, MD, retired and was replaced as president and CEO by Philip M. Gattone, M.Ed.

In April 2024, the organization transitioned from Hemophilia.org to Bleeding.org as the new URL encapsulates NBDF's commitment to serving a diverse community of individuals affected by inheritable bleeding disorders.

== Activities ==
The NBDF raises money and awareness of blood and bleeding disorders and supports research to end the diseases. Its efforts include lobbying Congress to help people with inheritable blood and bleeding disorders.

The NBDF honors Bleeding Disorders Awareness Month, to raise awareness of inheritable blood and bleeding disorders among the public, lawmakers, medical professionals and others. Related annual fundraising campaigns are called Red Tie Campaigns. The NBDF also hosts comedy fundraisers to support its efforts.

The organization also organizes an annual national Unite Day event to encourage community participation in the foundation's mission. The day includes a Unite for Bleeding Disorders Walk.

The NBDF also awards the Jason Fulton Memorial Scholarship, to members of its two-year National Youth Leadership Institute (NYLI) professional development program who help the hemophiliac community.
