= Gemma Bond =

English ballet dancer

- Born: 20 July 1982 (age 43); Bedfordshire, England
- Education: Royal Ballet School
- Known for: Ballet

Gemma Bond is an English ballet dancer and member of the corps de ballet with American Ballet Theatre (ABT).

== Biography ==
Bond was born in Bedfordshire, England. She received her early training in dance at the Sylvia Bebb School of Dance in Bedford, before entering professional training at the Royal Ballet School. Whilst training at the school, she danced the role of Zulme in Giselle in the school's annual performance at the Royal Opera House, Covent Garden. Bond was contracted to The Royal Ballet in 2000 as a member of the corps de ballet, later being promoted to First Artist in 2003. Bond remained with the Royal Ballet until 2008, when she was invited to join American Ballet Theatre, where she now dances as a member of the corps de ballet. In 2013 she worked with the New York Theater Ballet to choreograph Silent Titles.

== Selected Repertoire ==
=== Created Roles ===
- Siren Song - a ballet choreographed by Poppy Ben David, for the Royal Ballet's New Works season

=== Royal Ballet ===
- Olga in Onegin, choreographed by John Cranko
- Princess Stephanie in Mayerling, choreographed by Sir Kenneth MacMillan
- Clara in The Nutcracker, choreographed by Sir Peter Wright
- Fairy of the Song Bird in The Sleeping Beauty
- Marie in Anastasia
- Swan Lake, dancing the role of a Cygnet
- La Sylphide, dancing the role of a Sylphide

=== American Ballet Theatre ===
- Fairy of Charity in The Sleeping Beauty
- Italian Princess in Swan Lake, also dancing the role of a Cygnet
- Effie in La Sylphide

== Reviews ==
- Mackrell, Judith (11 December 2007). "Dance review: The Nutcracker / Royal Opera House, London". The Guardian.
