= Hee Seo =

South Korean ballet dancer

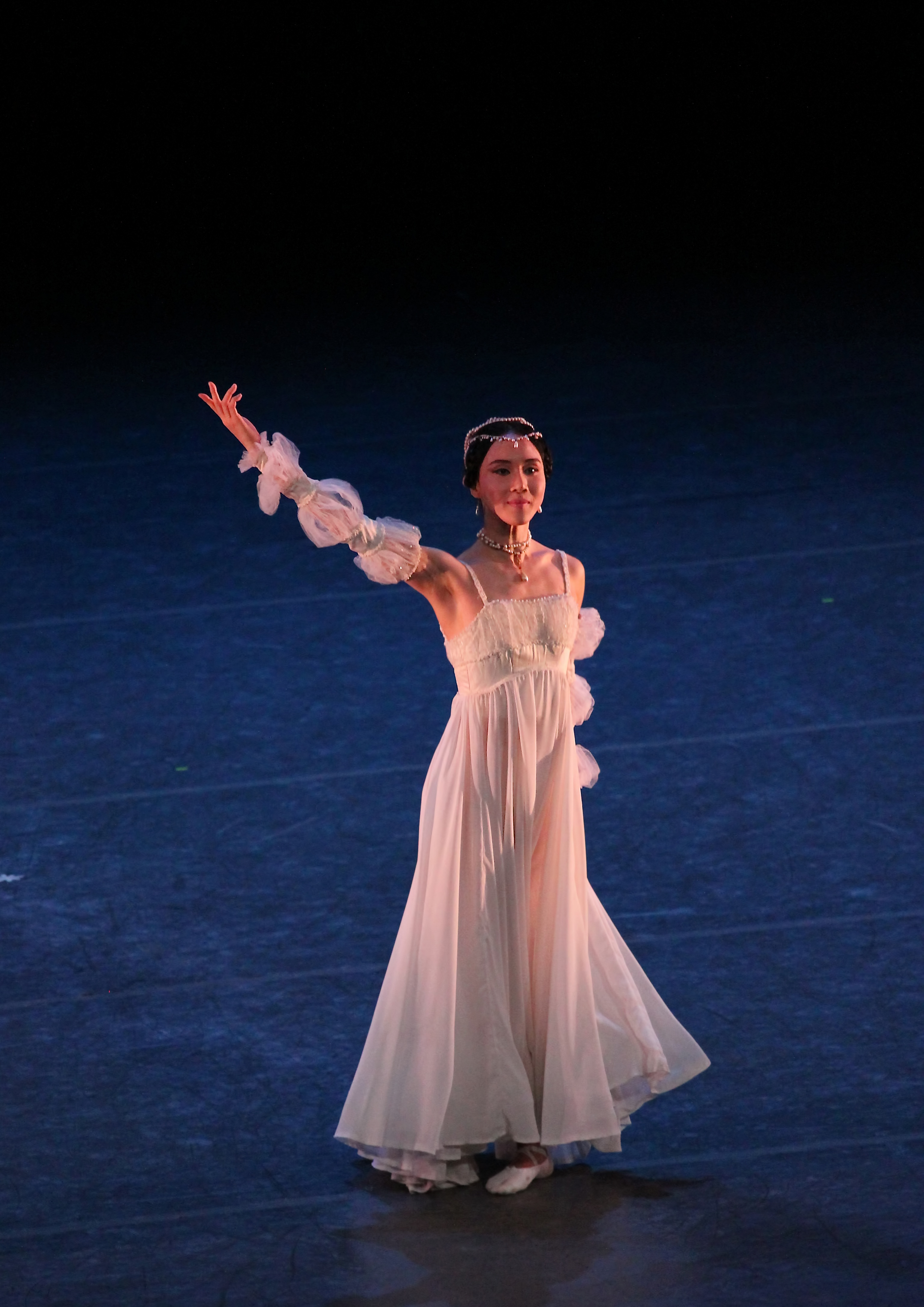
- Seo curtain call for The Moor's Pavane on 8 November 2013
- Born: 13 March 1986 (age 40); Seoul, South Korea
- Education: Sunhwa Arts School; Kirov Academy of Ballet; John Cranko Schule; American Ballet Theatre Studio Company
- Occupation: Principal dancer
- Years active: 2004–present
- Career
- Current group: American Ballet Theatre

Korean name
- Hangul: 서희
- Hanja: 徐姬
- RR: Seo Hui
- MR: Sŏ Hŭi

Hee Seo (Korean: 서희; born 13 March 1986) is a South Korean ballet dancer who is a principal dancer at the American Ballet Theatre (ABT), one of the three leading classical ballet companies in the United States. She became the company's first Korean ballerina to be promoted to principal dancer in ABT's 75-year history. She is also one of the youngest dancers in ABT history to be promoted to principal at the age of twenty-six. The New York Times has described her style and dancing to "exude an unhurried purity that sums up all that is lovely about ballet" and by Vogue as "unspeakably lissome". Several critics have noted her style as "lyrical and open" and she has been critically acclaimed for her "humility" and "unique feminine strength".

Seo began training in Russian ballet at the age of eleven, originally recreationally. Seo has stated on numerous occasions that she did not have aspirations of becoming a professional ballet dancer. Her teachers identified her skills and talents early on, and within a short period of time she was offered full scholarships to study abroad at prestigious ballet schools. She gained further notice by winning a scholarship at the 2003 Prix de Lausanne as well as the Grand Prix at the 2003 Youth America Grand Prix.

She was rapidly promoted from the ABT Studio Company and joined the full company in May 2005. She was again quickly promoted into the corps de ballet in March 2006 and then to soloist in August 2010 before finally being named as principal dancer in July 2012 by Kevin McKenzie, the artistic director of ABT. During her time at ABT, she has performed numerous lead roles in classical and contemporary ballet.

== Early life ==
Hee Seo was born in Seoul, South Korea. Her mother, aunt, and grandmother all studied fine arts and she, along with her two older and younger brothers, studied piano and took swimming lessons. Seo has stated that one of the reasons she has a strong relationship with her mother was because she did not have a sister.

In middle school, Seo was the student class president and was offered the opportunity to participate in an entrance competition for the Sunhwa Arts School. She had been dancing for six months, but had not received any formal ballet training. She entered into the competition and was awarded a scholarship to attend the Sunhwa School. Originally, her parents opposed her leaving due to her young age, but were persuaded otherwise by one of her teachers. Seo had only enrolled for one year before leaving to further study ballet in a professional training program in the United States.

== Training and career ==
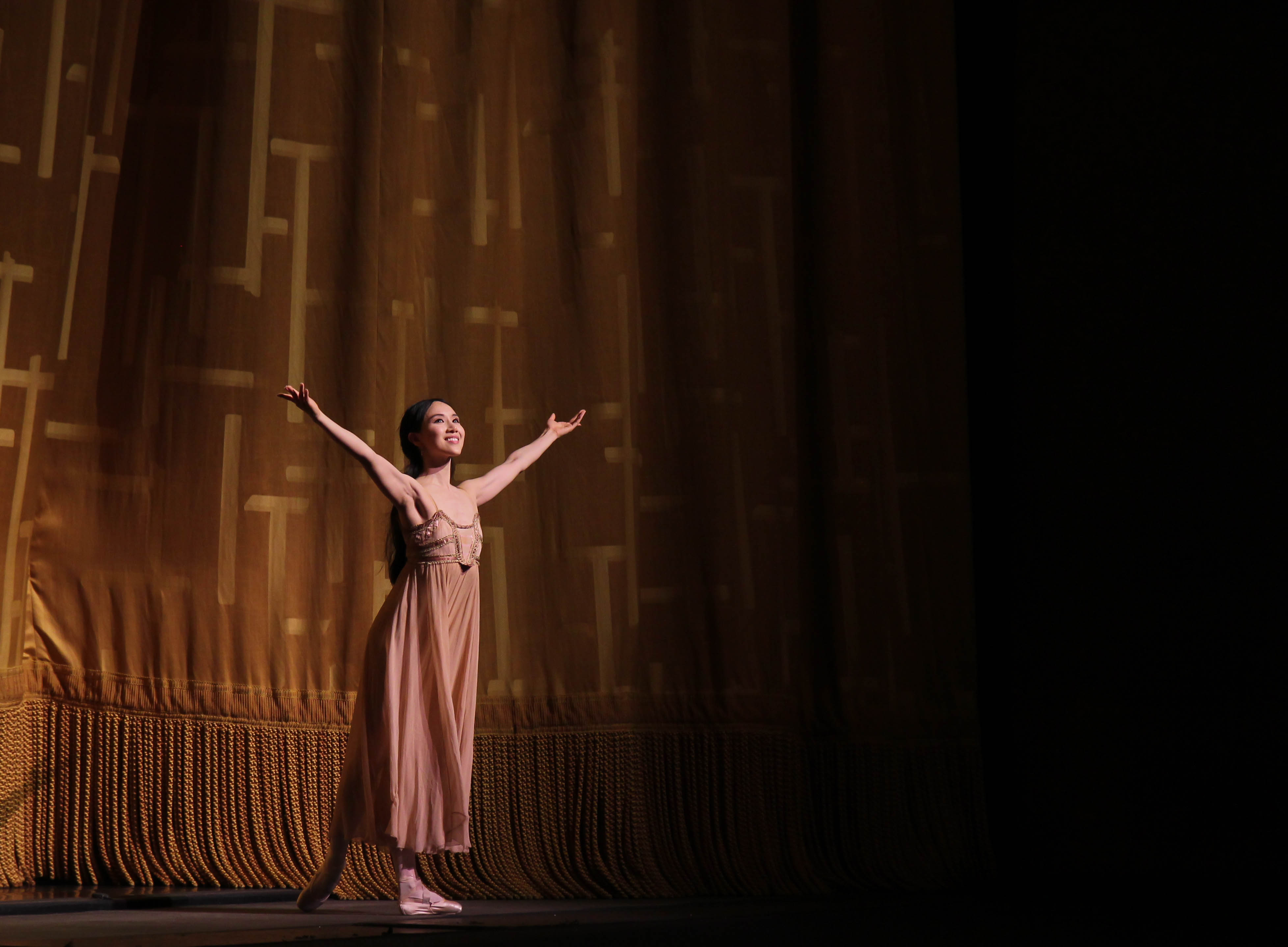
Seo curtain call for Romeo and Juliet, 19 June 2015

Seo started her formal dance training at age eleven, which is a fairly late start for a ballet dancer. Jillian Laub from movmnt has described Seo as having "the perfect body for ballet". At thirteen, she was invited to attend and awarded a full three-year scholarship to study under Alla Sizova at the Kirov Academy of Ballet (formerly the Universal Ballet Academy) in Washington DC. Seo has often stated Sizova was a major influence and mentor in her life. Jacqueline Akhmedova was also one of her teachers and helped train her for competitions. Akhmedova said, "Seo [was] the best student she has ever had".

Seo won the 2003 Prix de Lausanne Award in Switzerland and was offered a scholarship by Reid Anderson to attend the John Cranko Schule. That same year, Seo won the Grand Prix at the 2003 Youth America Grand Prix. John Meehan asked her to join the American Ballet Theatre Studio Company in the following year where she stayed until joining American Ballet Theatre as an apprentice in May 2005.

In the beginning, Seo's transition to the ABT company was difficult. She had trained under the Russian syllabus at Cranko and needed to make the transition to the "American style". Seo noted that "the ABT style is to leave the dancers alone. Individual character matters here, and dance that lacks originality cannot survive". She was able to adapt with the assistance of her mentors who also at the time helped her overcome a serious back injury. In March 2006, she was promoted to the rank of corps de ballet. She gained significant attention in 2009 when she performed the female lead in MacMillan's Romeo and Juliet, La Sylphide, and On the Dnieper. She debuted as Juliet on her twenty-third birthday which she has said was "one of [her] favorites". Cory Stearns, at the time a newly promoted member of the corps de ballet, partnered her as the other titular character of Romeo.

She became a soloist in August 2010 and principal dancer in July 2012. She was the first Korean ballerina to be promoted to principal dancer in ABT's 75-year history and, at age 26, one of the company's youngest dancers to be so promoted. Her promotion drew further attention as Seo was one of only three principal dancers in the company to have been promoted from the ABT Studio Company. Julia Moon, the Ballet Director of Universal Ballet, said that "Seo has an incredible talent, not just in dancing but also acting. I have never doubted that someday she would become a principal dancer at ABT". Seo has been noted for her "lyrical and open" style and "unique feminine strength" by several critics including The New York Times, Dance Magazine, and KoreAm.

Seo's debut performance as Principal dancer in 2012 was as Princess Aurora in The Sleeping Beauty and the Swan Queen in Swan Lake. Seo has said that Swan Lake was her most challenging ballet. The iconic classic ballet is notoriously difficult and demanding. The lead ballerina performs the contrasting roles of Odette, the White Swan, and Odile, the Black Swan. In an interview with Pointe magazine, Seo said that she "prefers the mental and physical challenge of full-length ballets over repertory works". In particular, Swan Lake "is physically and mentally exhausting, but so beautiful."

In 2014, Seo gained the opportunity to dance several full-length roles in her second year as principal, when three of ABT's senior principal ballerinas announced their retirement. This placed Seo in line for several leading roles. The 2016 ABT season, almost ten years from Seo's lead debut, she and promoted Principal dancer Cory Stearns reprised their parts as Romeo and Juliet as first cast at the Wolf Trap National Park for the Performing Arts. Seo has said, "when I dance with Cory, I feel like I’m going back to those years". Seo again reprised her role as the famous Princess Aurora in Sleeping Beauty. Alastair Macaulay of The New York Times on Seo's performance, "she has most revealed the distinctiveness, elegance and authority of an important ballerina". She commonly partners with Roberto Bolle, including Bolle's final performance with ABT.

Seo models for Bloch and wears their pointe shoes. In an interview with The Wall Street Journal, Seo stated that she "carries three to six new pairs a day and alternates them in class and rehearsals to break them in" and that she "can go through a pair a day once the shoes become too soft to support her feet".

Her performances are sponsored by Pamela and David B. Ford. Seo resides in Manhattan in New York City.

== Roles and repertoire at ABT ==
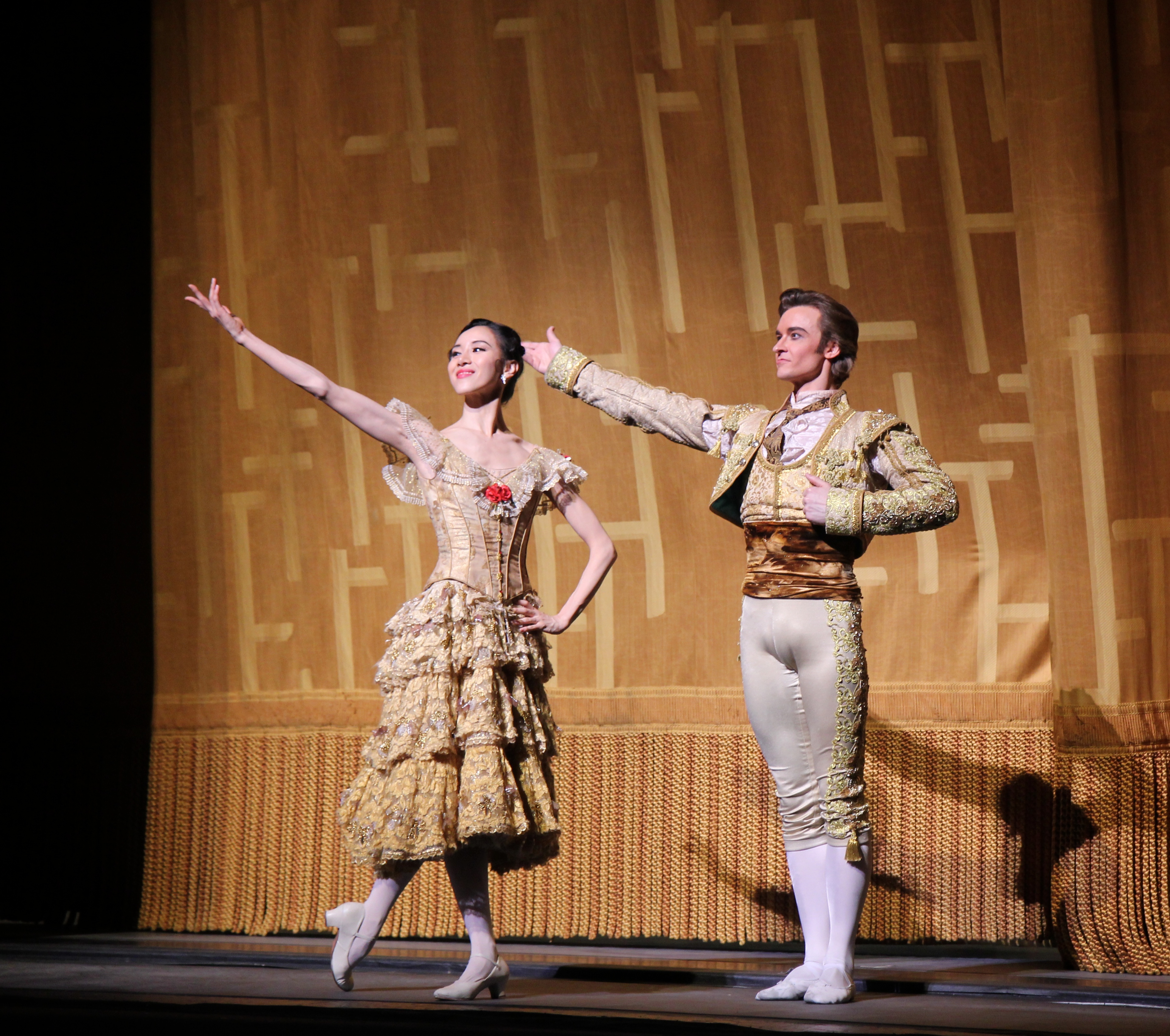
Seo and Jared Matthews curtain call for Don Quixote, 17 May 2014

=== Full length ballets ===
Title	Role	Choreographer	Ref(s)
Apollo	Polyhymnia	George Balanchine	
La Bayadère	Nikiya, Gamzatti, the Lead D'Jampe and Shade	Natalia Makarova, after Marius Petipa	
Cinderella	Cinderella	Frederick Ashton	
Cinderella	Twig	James Kudelka	
Coppélia	Prayer	Nicholas Sergeyev	
Don Quixote	Mercedes and flower girl	Marius Petipa and Alexander Gorsky	
Gaîté Parisienne	The Glove Seller	Léonide Massine	
Giselle	Giselle and Zulma	Jean Coralli, Jules Perrot and Marius Petipa	
Jardin aux Lilas	Caroline	Antony Tudor	
The Lady of the Camellias	Olympia	John Neumeier	
The Moor's Pavane	The Moor's Wife	José Limón	
A Month in the Country	Natalia Petrovna	Frederick Ashton	
The Nutcracker	Clara, the Princess and Nutcracker's Sister	Alexei Ratmansky	
On the Dnieper	Natalia	Alexei Ratmansky	
Onegin	Tatiana	John Cranko	
Romeo and Juliet	Juliet	Kenneth MacMillan	
The Sleeping Beauty	Princess Aurora, the Lilac Fairy, the Fairy of Sincerity and Princess Florine	Marius Petipa and Alexei Ratmansky	
Swan Lake	Odette-Odile, the pas de trois, the Polish Princess and a big swan	Kevin McKenzie, after Marius Petipa and Lev Ivanov	
La Sylphide	The Sylph	August Bournonville	
Les Sylphides	The Prelude	Michel Fokine	
Sylvia	Ceres	Frederick Ashton	
Jane Eyre	Blanche Ingram	Cathy Marston	
L'histoire de Manon	Manon	Kenneth MacMillan	
Of Love and Rage	Callirhoe	Alexei Ratmansky	
Whipped Cream	Princess Tea Flower	Alexei Ratmansky	
Like Water for Chocolate	Rosaura	Christopher Wheeldon	

=== Other ballets and repertoire ===
Title	Choreographer	Ref(s)
Ballo della Regina	George Balanchine	
Birthday Offering	Frederick Ashton	
The Brahms-Haydn Variations	Twyla Tharp	
Chamber Symphony	Alexei Ratmansk	
Dark Elegies	Antony Tudor	
Drink to Me Only With Thine Eyes	Mark Morris	
Duets	Merce Cunningham	
From Here On Out	Benjamin Millepied	
The Leaves Are Fading	Antony Tudor	
Overgrown Path	Jiří Kylián	
Raymonda Divertissements	Marius Petipa	
Seven Sonatas	Alexei Ratmansky	
Thaïs Pas de Deux	Frederick Ashton	
Thirteen Diversions	Christopher Wheeldon	
Other Dances	Jerome Robbins	

=== Created roles ===
Title	Choreographer	Ref(s)
With a Chance of Rain	Liam Scarlett	
The Seasons	Alexei Ratmansky	
AFTERITE	Wayne McGregor	
Garden Blue	Jessica Lang	
I Feel The Earth Move	Benjamin Millepied	
