= First Position =

- Directed by: Bess Kargman
- Produced by: Bess Kargman
- Starring: Michaela DePrince; Aran Bell; Gaya Bommer-Yemini; Miko Fogarty; Jules Fogarty; Joan Sebastian Zamora; Rebecca Houseknecht; Giuseppe Bausilio
- Cinematography: Nick Higgins
- Edited by: Kate Amend; Bess Kargman
- Music by: Chris Hajian
- Production company: First Position Films
- Distributed by: Sundance Selects
- Release dates: September 11, 2011 (Toronto International Film Festival); May 4, 2012 (United States)
- Running time: 90 minutes
- Country: United States
- Language: English
- Box office: $1,730,824

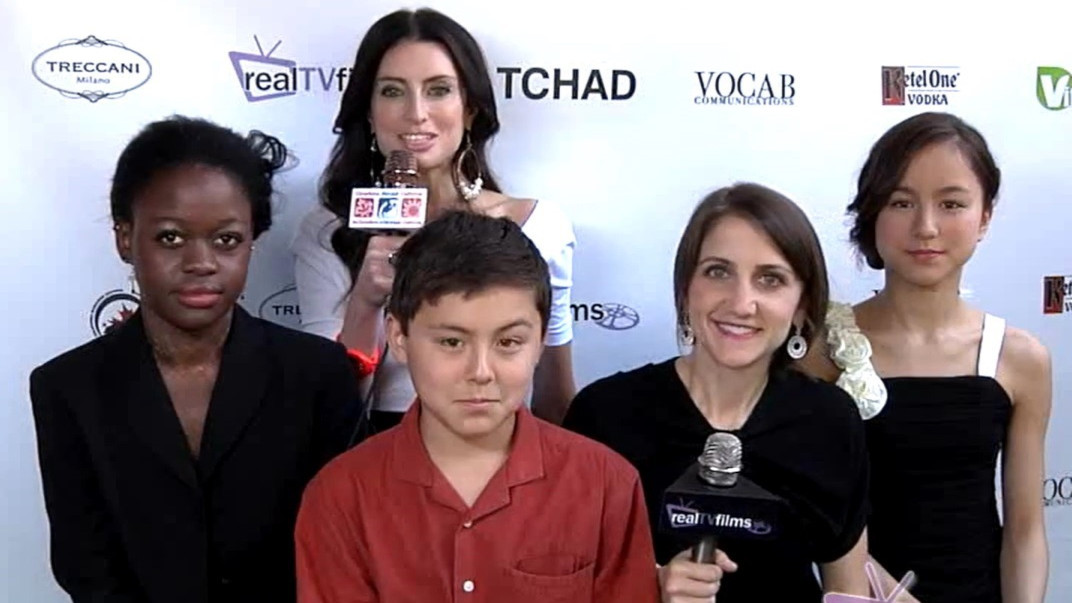
Cast of "First Position" ballet documentary interviewed at Toronto International Film Festival 2011. Left to right: dancer Michaela DePrince, interviewer Samantha Gutstadt, dancer Jules Fogarty, director Bess Kargman, dancer Miko Fogarty.

First Position is a 2011 American documentary film. It follows six young dancers preparing for the Youth America Grand Prix in New York City, an annual competition for dancers ages 9–19 to earn a place at an elite ballet company or school. Directed by Bess Kargman, it features Michaela DePrince, Aran Bell, Gaya Bommer-Yemini, Miko Fogarty, Jules Fogarty, Joan Sebastian Zamora and Rebecca Houseknecht as they intensively train and prepare for what could be the turning point of their lives.

The title 'First Position' is taken from one of the five standard positions of the feet in classical ballet.

Kargman was a first-time director who had studied dance herself. "I ended up quitting my job to make this film, my first film, and I thought maybe by choosing a topic that was quite dear to me and that I had lived for a number of years growing up—maybe I’d be able to do this story justice." The film features renowned dancers and choreographers from all over the world including Nadine Bommer, Denys Ganio, Élisabeth Platel, Raymond Lukens, and Youth America Grand Prix's founder Larissa Saveliev.

== Reception ==
The film garnered critical acclaim, receiving a rating of 93% on the website Rotten Tomatoes. The site's critical consensus reads, "An upbeat and visually dramatic documentary of children's ballet, First Position displays the potential of the human spirit when fostered at a young age." Manohla Dargis of The New York Times praised the film as creating "pocket portraits of children whose dedication to their art is by turns inspiring, daunting and, at times, a little frightening." Frank Scheck of The Hollywood Reporter wrote that First Position "overcomes its predictable elements thanks to the inherent visual drama of watching children strain their bodies to the limit in obsessive pursuit of their goals."

The film was the first runner-up for Best Documentary at the Toronto International Film Festival where it premiered, winning the Jury Prize at the San Francisco Doc Fest, and audience awards for Best Documentary at the Dallas International Film Festival and at the Portland International Film Festival, where Bess Kargman also won Best New Director. The film's takings were $48,024 on its opening weekend in the first weekend of May. As of 24 June 2012, the film had grossed $894,471 in the United States.
