= Cesar Corrales =

Cuban-Canadian dancer and actor

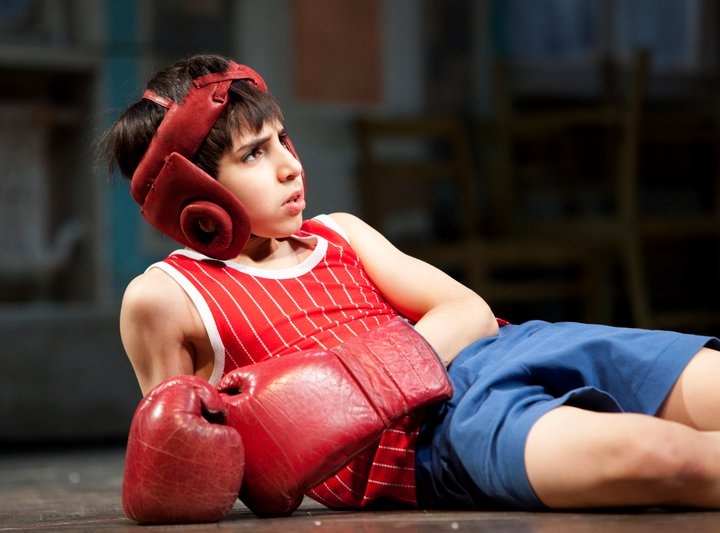
Cesar Corrales from the Boxing scene in the Chicago production of Billy Elliot the Musical

Cesar Corrales (born September 26, 1996) is a Cuban-Canadian ballet dancer and actor. He starred as "Young Billy" in the Chicago and Toronto productions of Billy Elliot the Musical and has been a principal dancer with English National Ballet. He is now a principal dancer with The Royal Ballet.

== Early life and education ==
Born in Mexico City to Cuban parents, and raised in Canada, Corrales received his initial training from his parents, Jesus Corrales, a former principal with the Royal Winnipeg Ballet and Les Grands Ballets Canadiens and Taina Morales, a fellow Royal Winnipeg Ballet dancer and formerly a soloist for Cuban National Ballet. At the age of 4 he appeared in the Royal Winnipeg's production of Madama Butterfly. Soon afterwards he appeared in the Jennifer Lopez movie, Shall We Dance?.

In 2008 he won first place in Coupe Quebec gymnastics competition. That same year he joined National Ballet of Canada's school and trained there until he was cast in the starring role of the Chicago premiere of Billy Elliot the musical. He performed alongside the Tony-award nominated actress Emily Skinner, who played his dance teacher. After the Chicago production closed at the end of 2010, he starred in the show's 2011 Toronto premiere. After leaving Billy Elliot he returned to training in ballet.

== Ballet career ==
Corrales competed in and won the Prix de Lausanne in 2013 which offered a significant scholarship from the Oak Foundation. Rather than accepting this prize, he followed his mother to Europe and continued training with her while she was guest teaching at the Norwegian Ballet.

He joined American Ballet Theatre Studio Company in 2014. While dancing with the company he won the Grand Prix Award and Artistry Award at the Youth America Grand Prix. He joined English National Ballet in 2015, where he won the company's Emerging Dancer Award in 2016.

In 2017 he became a principal dancer at the ENB and also won the National Dance Award for Outstanding Male Performance for Le Corsaire. The following year he was declared one of Dance Magazine's "25 to Watch". His repertory with English National Ballet included Ali in Le Corsaire, Drosselymeyer's Nephew in The Nutcracker, Mercutio in Rudolf Nureyev's Romeo and Juliet, Albrecht in Giselle, Franz in Coppélia, and leading roles in Fantastic Beings, Le Jeune homme et la mort and In the middle, somewhat elevated. He also created the role of Hilarion in the premiere of Akram Khan's Giselle.

In 2018, he joined The Royal Ballet as a first soloist. He made his debut as Romeo in Kenneth MacMillan's Romeo and Juliet alongside Francesca Hayward in May 2019. In May 2021, he was promoted to principal dancer.
