= Shanghai Orchestra Academy =

Two-year post-graduate program of advanced orchestral training in Shanghai, China

The Shanghai Orchestra Academy is a two-year post-graduate program of advanced orchestral training in Shanghai, China. It is a joint effort of the Shanghai Symphony Orchestra and the New York Philharmonic, in partnership with the Shanghai Conservatory of Music. Its first class was admitted in 2014 and graduated in July 2016. Applicants are accepted by audition from around the world.

Students are provided with master classes, coaching, mock auditions, and seminars, with instruction in Orchestra Performance, Chamber Music, and Musicianship Skills. Teaching is provided by musicians of both orchestras and instructors from the conservatory, and sometimes visiting orchestras as well. New York Philharmonic teachers visit four times a year for lessons. Graduates of the program receive a Master of Fine Arts degree in Orchestral Performance from the Shanghai Conservatory. Some students may be selected as Zarin Mehta Fellows who travel to New York for a one-week orchestra immersion experience.
