= Youth America Grand Prix =

Student ballet competition and scholarship program

Youth American Grand Prix
- Genre: Ballet and contemporary dance competition
- Frequency: annually
- Years active: 1999-present
- Founders: Larissa Saveliev, Gennadi Saveliev

Youth America Grand Prix (YAGP) is a non-profit international youth ballet and contemporary dance competition and scholarship program established in 1999.

== Overview ==
Each year, over 10,000 dancers participate in the competitions and auditions YAGP conducts in various locations in North America and international locations including Argentina, Australia, Belgium, Brazil, Canada, China, France, Italy, Japan, Korea, Mexico, Paraguay.

YAGP is a member of the International Federation of Ballet Competitions (IFBC) and is a partner competition to Moscow International Ballet Competition, Prix de Lausanne, Varna International Ballet Competition, and USA International Ballet Competition.

YAGP is featured in the 2011 documentary First Position.

To provide increased opportunity to the growing number of participants at regional semi-finals, and to make sure that each event is a stand-alone educational experience, since 2012 YAGP has offered scholarships at the regional semi-final level.

In 20 years since YAGP's founding, over 100,000 dancers have participated in YAGP events around the world. By January 2017, more than $3 million has been awarded to young dancers in scholarships to dance academies, and more than 350 alumni are now dancing with 80 companies around the world.

== History ==
While pursuing her teaching career in the United States, Larissa Saveliev wanted to showcase the progress of her students and learn from other teachers in the area. She was hoping to find a ballet version of the jazz dance competitions that were very popular at the time, yet there were no ballet competitions for students in the U.S. In 1999, together with her husband Gennadi Saveliev (then a soloist with American Ballet Theatre) she decided to create one – and founded Youth America Grand Prix.

YAGP was created and developed with the active involvement of Sergey Gordeev, who became YAGP's Founding Director of External Affairs, Shelley King, who led the team as Operations Director, giving over 12 years to the organization, Barbara Brandt, who served as YAGP's first Chair of the Board of Directors, and continues to stay actively involved as a board member and Chair Emeritus, Judith M. Hoffmann, who joined as one of the first members of the Board of Directors, and Linda Morse, who serves as the current and longest-running Chair of the Board of Directors.

YAGP was officially launched in 1999 with competitions and classes held in Boston, Washington, DC., Chicago, Los Angeles and Boca Raton. 8 American schools presented scholarships in the first year of YAGP's existence.

Royal Ballet School was the first international scholarship presenter.

YAGP was the first competition to introduce the concept that a student does not have to win 1st, 2nd or 3rd place to receive a prize (scholarship). Scholarships at YAGP are awarded based on each individual school director's evaluation of a student's potential, independently of the panel of judges’ decision. This concept has now been widely adopted by many other ballet competitions around the world.

In 2005, the United Nations Educational, Scientific and Cultural Organization (UNESCO) recognized YAGP's contribution to international dance education by awarding it with a membership in UNESCO's prestigious Conseil International de la Danse (CID).

In 2007 Youth America Grand Prix became the first organization in the 50-year history of Italy's prestigious Spoleto Dance Festival to present performances by dance students.

In 2009, YAGP broke the existing Guinness World Record for “Most ballet dancers en pointe” with 221 dancers from 27 countries.

In 2010 YAGP introduced the YAGP Job Fair, a special audition series giving YAGP participants and alumni a chance to be seen and hired by the directors of the world's leading dance companies.

In 2014 YAGP launched a new dance education initiative: “Dance in Higher Education” - a program that gives dance students and their parents an opportunity to meet with representatives of the country's leading college and university-based dance programs and learn about options in combining academic education with dance training.

== Competition ==
YAGP participants are divided into three age categories: Senior Age Category (15–19 years old), Junior Age Category (12–14 years old), and Pre-Competitive Age Category (9–11 years old).

In addition to scholarships, YAGP grants other awards to the most talented participants, such as Dance Europe Award, Makarova Award and others. The most outstanding dancer in the Senior category receives the Grand Prix (US$16,000). An exceptional dancer in the Junior category receives a Youth Grand Prix, and a dancer who shows the most potential in the Pre-Competitive category receives the Hope Award (US$3,500). First, Second, and Third Places are awarded to Men and Women in the Senior, Junior and Pre-Competitive category of soloists. First, Second and Third places are awarded in the Ensembles categories, for large ensembles and for Pas de Deux.

To develop respect for artistry among its students, YAGP holds classes and workshops at every competition that are taught by the panel of judges.

=== Scholarship awards ===
Each year, more than $500,000 is awarded at YAGP in scholarships to the world's leading dance academies. While some institutions are represented every year, others present scholarships on a rotating basis. The YAGP panel of judges represents schools that issue scholarships to participants.

=== Critical reception ===
- "Youth America Grand Prix has grown to become the largest and one of the most influential youth ballet competitions in the world" and has become “a game changer in the dance world. Almost overnight, Youth America Grand Prix created a central ballet marketplace.” – Laura Bleiberg, The Los Angeles Times.

== Programs and initiatives ==
=== Galas ===
==== YAGP Gala “Stars of Today Meet the Stars of Tomorrow” ====
As part of its mission to educate the next generations of dancers and audiences, YAGP uses its New York City “Stars of Today Meet the Stars of Tomorrow” Gala as a venue to introduce new talent to New York audiences and the young YAGP participants from around the world. Many dancers made their New York debut at YAGP's “Stars of Today Meet the Stars of Tomorrow” Gala. They have included Polina Semionova (Berlin State Ballet); Denis and Anastasia Matvienko, Yevgenia Obraztsova, and Ivan Vasiliev (Bolshoi Ballet); Friedemann Vogel (Stuttgart Ballet); Daniel Camargo, Sasha Mukhamedov and Edo Wijnen (Dutch National Ballet); Yonah Acosta (English National Ballet); Hugo Marchand and Hannah O’Neill (Paris Opera Ballet); Melissa Hamilton and Cesar Corrales (The Royal Ballet); Cecilia Kerche and Vitor Luiz (Theatro Municipal (Rio de Janeiro)) & Evan McKie representing both (The National Ballet of Canada) & the (Stuttgart Ballet).

In keeping with its educational mission, YAGP has also used its New York City Gala as an opportunity to present a number of dancers' farewell performances in New York, in order to give young dancers, a chance to experience extraordinary artistry in a live performance. As part of its innovative programming, the YAGP Galas have included the New York farewell performances of such internationally known ballet stars as Paris Opera Ballet's Etoile dancer Manuel Legris, Bolshoi Ballet’s Nikolai Tsiskaridze, and The Royal Ballet's Darcey Bussell.

The program of the Gala ranges from the well-known ballet classics to cutting-edge contemporary choreography. In an effort to provide opportunities not only to talented young dancers but also to young choreographers, YAGP launched the Emerging Choreographer Series. As part of this annual series, YAGP has created a powerful platform for up-and-coming choreographers to present their work to the international dance community. The Emerging Choreographer Series has presented works by Camille A. Brown, Marcelo Gomes, Adam Hougland, Emery LeCrone, Gemma Bond, Susan Jaffe, Evan McKie (with Olga Smirnova) and Justin Peck – many of them debuting with World Premieres.

YAGP Galas have also presented World Premieres by such established choreographers as Camille A. Brown, Derek Hough, Benjamin Millepied and Carlos dos Santos, Jr.

The critical reception of the Gala was positive, as illustrated by the following quotes:

The YAGP Gala performers are “a truly impressive parade of artists.” – Jocelyn Noveck, The Moscow Times (AP)

“The Makarova gala crowned three performances by international artists and by Youth America Grand Prix hopefuls.” – Robert Johnson, The Star-Ledger

=== First Position film ===
In 2011, YAGP was featured in First Position, an award-winning documentary directed by Bess Kargman. The film followed six young YAGP participants – Michaela DePrince, Aran Bell, Gaya Bommer-Yemini, Miko Fogarty, Jules Fogarty, Joan Sebastian Zamora, and Rebecca Houseknecht – on their journey to YAGP's New York City Finals.

First Position received its World Premiere at the 36th Annual Toronto International Film Festival on September 11, 2011. It won high critical acclaim and several awards at major U.S. film festivals before it was released in theaters in the United States on May 4, 2012.

=== Dance and Fashion Exhibit at the FIT ===
In 2014, YAGP became a part of fashion history through the “Dance & Fashion” exhibit at the Museum of the Fashion Institute of Technology. Organized by the Museum director Valerie Steele, this unprecedented exhibition explored the synergy between dance and fashion, driven by inspiration and collaboration.

As part of the exhibit, pre-eminent U.S. fashion designer Ralph Rucci created special costumes for YAGP Alum Calvin Royal III (currently principal dancer at American Ballet Theatre), who performed a specially commissioned piece, choreographed by Gemma Bond to the original music by Karen LeFrak.

The exhibit moves from the 19th century all the way to the present and highlights how many designers and their creations have been inspired by dance over time. Moreover, it emphasizes how each apparel design may fit a specific story, emotion, overall dance portrayal (etc), and its importance when creating new styles for dance.

== Notable alumni ==
- Maria Abashova
- Isabella Boylston
- Cesar Corrales
- Michaela DePrince
- Sasha De Sola
- Matthew Golding
- Melissa Hamilton
- Sarah Lane
- Lauren Lovette
- Brooklyn Mack
- Sara Mearns
- Leroy Mokgatle
- Sergei Polunin
- Hee Seo
- Cory Stearns
- Jeon Min-chul
