= Greta Hodgkinson =

American-Canadian ballet dancer

- Born: August 13, 1973 (age 53); Providence, Rhode Island, U.S.
- Citizenship: United States; Canada
- Occupation: Ballet dancer
- Years active: 1990–present
- Spouse: Etienne Lavigne
- Children: 2
- Dancing career
- Former groups: National Ballet of Canada
- Dances: Ballet

Greta Hodgkinson O.Ont (born August 13, 1973) is an American-Canadian ballet dancer. She was a Principal dancer with the National Ballet of Canada until she stepped down in 2020. She continues to perform freelance and is Artist-in-Residence of the National Ballet.

== Early life and training ==
Hodgkinson was born in Providence, Rhode Island. She is of Armenian, English, and French-Canadian descent. She took part in dancing, ice-skating, and gymnastics as a child. From 1983 to 1985 she trained at Festival Ballet Providence, now Ballet RI, with Winthrop Corey and Christine Hennessey. She was eleven years old when she moved to Canada to further her training at Canada's National Ballet School in Toronto, skipping seventh grade. She was mentored by ballet mistress Magdalena Popa.

=== Continuing education ===
She took courses at Harvard Business School Online from 2020 to 2022, acquiring certificates in Leadership Principles, Negotiation Mastery, Power and Influence for Positive Impact, and Specialization in Leadership and Management.

== Career ==
=== National Ballet of Canada ===
At sixteen, Greta Hodgkinson joined The National Ballet of Canada’s Corps de Ballet (1990 – 1993). She was promoted to Second Soloist (1993-1995), then First Soloist (1995-1996) and, shortly before her 27th birthday, reached the highest rank of Principal Dancer (1996-2020). During her career, she has danced many of the main roles of the ballet repertoire, such as the title role in Giselle, Sugar Plum Fairy in The Nutcracker, and Juliet in Romeo and Juliet, as well as contemporary works by choreographers such as Jiří Kylián, Christopher Wheeldon, Wayne McGregor, and James Kudelka.

During 2019/20, her final season at the National Ballet of Canada, Greta Hodgkinson appeared in Jiry Kilian's Petite Mort and danced one of her signature roles, Giselle. Throughout her career, she received positive reviews about her performances: “The ballerina performing the compelling title character has to go from a tremulously innocent girl, to madwoman, to unearthly spirit, and Greta Hodgkinson is among the best in the world in the role.” (Paula Citron, The Globe and Mail) "Hodgkinson joins the great Giselles of our time." (Gary Smith, The Hamilton Spectator) “In the demanding title role, Greta Hodgkinson is a wonder, both as dancer and actress.” (Bob Clark, Calgary Herald) “Her breezy jumps paint her as a confident, yet trusting woman, who initially has no reason to doubt her man. She is also a technical dynamo, nailing every slow, sustained balance and complex turning sequence.” (National Post)

A few days before the COVID-19 pandemic shut down theatres throughout the world, her final performance was in the role of Marguerite in Frederick Ashton's Marguerite and Armand, partnered by Guillaume Côté. The ballet was acquired in her honor by Karen Kain and the National Ballet, as Greta Hodgkinson had expressed the desire to dance a new role rather than reprise a past one.

=== International Guest Artist ===
As an International Guest Artist, Greta Hodgkinson performed in over 72 cities and 16 countries. She was invited to dance with the top major ballet companies, including the Mariinsky Ballet, Teatro alla Scala, The Royal Ballet, Stuttgart Ballet, The Australian Ballet, Munich Ballet and Teatro Comunale di Firenze. She has also appeared in international galas in America, Asia, and Europe, including the Opening Gala of the Royal Opera House (London), the State Kremlin Palace (Moscow), Gala des Etoiles (Montreal), Stars of the 21st Century (Paris and Toronto) and the Opening Gala of Teatro alla Scala (Milan).

In 2003, Hodgkinson appeared at The 10th World Ballet Festival in Tokyo, Japan where she performed with frequent partner Roberto Bolle. Over their careers, they danced together in more than 26 cities worldwide. Tetsuya Kumakawa invited Hodgkinson to tour Japan dancing Swan Lake with him and his company, K-Ballet. Apart from Bolle and Kumakawa, Hodgkinson was sought after by many renowned artists including Carlos Acosta, Marcelo Gomes, Guillaume Côté, Massimo Murru, Laurent Hilaire, Federico Bonelli, Robert Tewsley, Zdenek Konvalina, Jason Reilly, Evan McKie, Steven McRae and Matthew Golding.

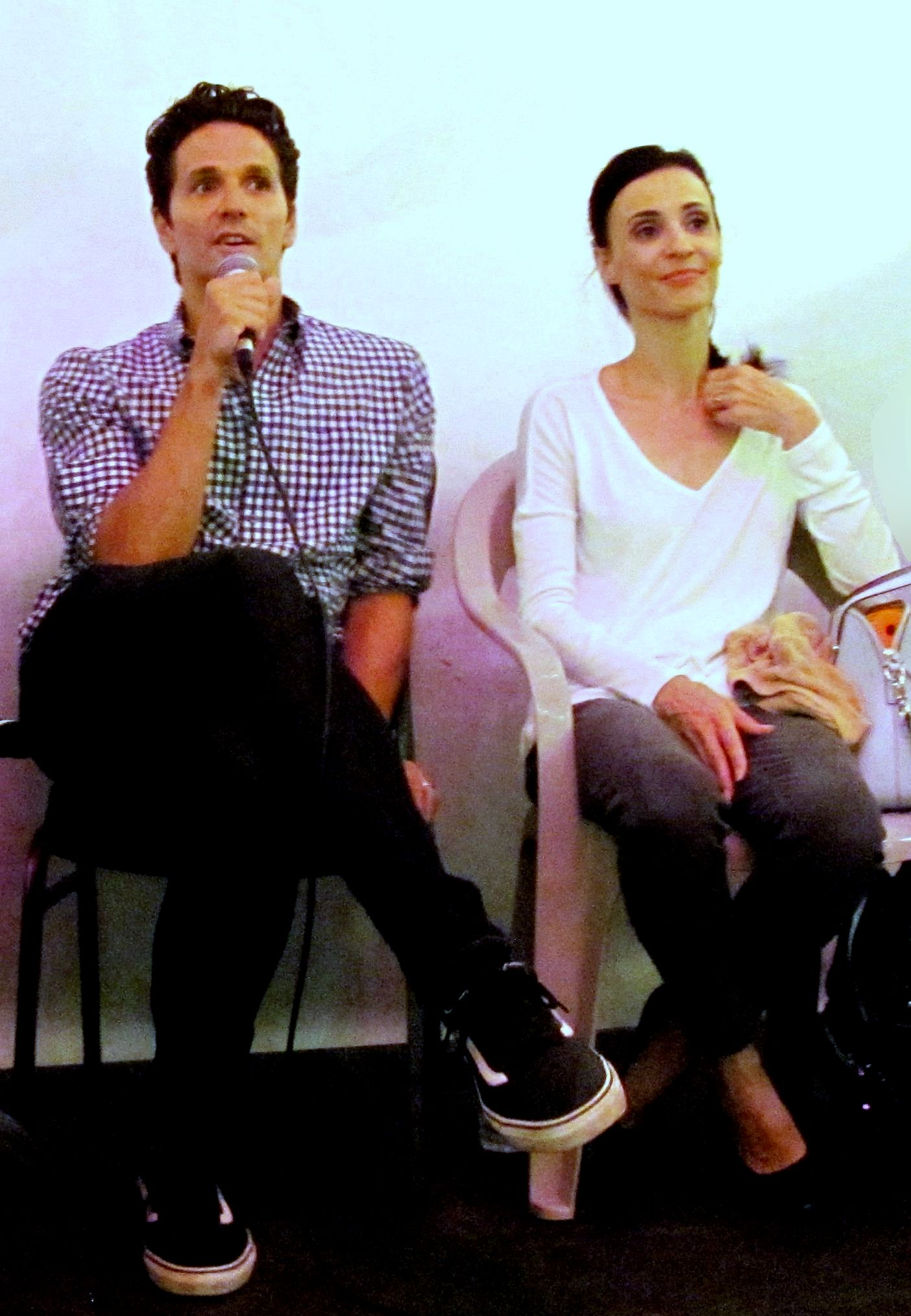
Dancer and choreographer Guillaume Côté and prima ballerina Greta Hodgkinson, at the chat following the premiere of Guillaume Côté's Crypto at Festival des Arts de Saint-Sauveur on July 31, 2019.

=== Muse ===
Greta Hodgkinson has had numerous roles created for her by the most influential choreographers of the 20th and 21st century. She enjoyed a "close creative symbiosis" with choreographer and former Artistic Director of The National Ballet of Canada, James Kudelka. He created the summer section of his 1997 abstract ballet, The Four Seasons, expressly for Hodgkinson and considered her a muse. As such, she helped create many of the lead roles in works that are now a part of The National Ballet of Canada's permanent repertoire, among them Swan Lake, The Nutcracker, and The Firebird.

Hodgkinson also worked closely with such icons as William Forsythe, Jiri Kylian, Glen Tetley, John Neumeier, Wayne McGregor, Christopher Wheeldon, Crystal Pite and Alexei Ratmansky. She also collaborated with such noted Canadian choreographers as Jean-Pierre Perreault, John Alleyne, Robert Desrosiers and Jean Grand-Maitre as well as emerging young Canadian choreographers Dominique Dumais, Sabrina Matthews, Matjash Mrozewski, and Guillaume Côté.

Over her 30-year career, Hodgkinson developed strong chemistry with frequent partners Rex Harrington, Aleksandar Antonijevic, Roberto Bolle and Guillaume Côté, "each one being wonderful in his own way".

She continues a creative collaboration with dancer and choreographer Guillaume Côté as a Muse, Creative Assistant, and Rehearsal Director. She created and toured in Crypto (2019-2022), a full evening multimedia work. She performed Hamlet’s mother in the Guillaume Côté-Robert Lepage adaptation of Shakespeare’s play, which premiered at Festival des arts de Saint-Sauveur in July 2023. In 2019, Ballet Kelowna launched its 17th season with Guillaume Côté’s Bolero with Greta Hodgkinson as Guest Artist. The company's artistic director, Simone Orlando, reflected on the experience: "She is really a superstar. She helped teach Bolero as well as offered so much to our dancers. She is fearless. The lifts in this piece are sort of death-defying. I’m sitting there, just holding my breath, hoping my dancers are going to catch her!”

=== Body of work ===
Greta Hodgkinson possesses "a rare daring and an ability to devour space with aplomb and intelligence."

Hodgkinson has performed many of the leading roles in the classical repertoire as well as contemporary works. "Being true to herself in an art form that values conformity is what has enabled Hodgkinson to stand out from the tutu-clad pack. She is a ballerina who dances to her own beat, a maverick with a killer work ethic and a heart of gold." (Deirdre Kelly, NUVO)

Lead roles:

- Alice (Glen Tetley)
- A Month in the Country (Sir Frederick Ashton)
- Apollo (George Balanchine)
- Carmen (Davide Bombana)
- Concerto Barocco (Balanchine)
- Divertimento #15 (Balanchine)
- Don Quixote (after Marius Petipa)
- Dream Dances (Jiří Kylían)
- The Dying Swan (Mikhail Fokine)
- Etudes (Harald Lander)
- Excelsior (Luigi Manzotti)
- Forgotten Land (Jiří Kylían)
- Giselle (Sir Peter Wright)
- Grand Pas Classique (Victor Gsovsky)
- Herman Schmerman (William Forsythe)
- In The Middle, Somewhat Elevated (Forsythe)
- In The Night (Jerome Robbins)
- Jewels (Balanchine)
- La Bayadère (Petipa)
- La Fille mal gardée (Ashton)
- La Ronde (Tetley)
- The Leaves are Fading (Antony Tudor)
- Manon (Kenneth MacMillan)
- Marguerite and Armand (Ashton)
- Monotones (MacMillan)
- Mozartiana (Balanchine)
- Musings (James Kudelka)
- No. 24 (Guillaume Côté)
- Nuages (Jiří Kylian)
- Onegin (John Cranko)
- Opus 19/The Dreamer (Robbins)
- Other Dances (Robbins)
- Pastorale (Kudelka)
- Paquita (Natalia Makarova)
- Petite Mort (Kylían)
- Romeo and Juliet (Cranko)
- Serenade (Balanchine)
- Symphony in C (Balanchine)
- Sphinx (Tetley)
- Spring Waters (Asaf Messerer)
- Split House Geometric (John Alleyne)
- Stravinsky Violin Concerto (Balanchine)
- Swan Lake (Erik Bruhn)
- Tagore (Tetley)
- Tchaikovsky Pas de Deux (Balanchine)
- The Four Temperaments (Balanchine)
- The Merry Widow (Ronald Hynd)
- The Nutcracker (Celia Franca/Derek Deane/James Kudelka)
- The Sleeping Beauty (Rudolf Nureyev)
- The Taming of the Shrew (Cranko)
- Theme and Variations (Balanchine)
- Voluntaries (Tetley)

Created Roles / World Premieres

- A Delicate Battle (Mrozewski, 2001)
- An Italian Straw Hat (Kudelka, 2005)
- Being & Nothingness (Côté, 2013 + 2015)
- Bolero (Côté, 2012)
- Cinderella (Kudelka, 2004)
- Crypto (Côté, 2019)
- Emergence (Pite, 2009)
- Frames of Mind (Grand-Maître, 1993)
- Grand Mirage (Côté, 2025)
- Hamlet (Côté, 2023)
- Interrogating Slam (Alleyne, 1991)
- Now and Then (Neumeier, 1993)
- one hundred words for snow (Dumais, 1999)
- Oracle (Tetley, 1994)
- Romeo and Juliet (Ratmansky, 2011)
- Rooster (Christopher Bruce, 2008)
- Septet (Alleyne, 1999)
- Swan Lake (Kudelka, 1999)
- The Comforts of Solitude (Perrault, 2001)
- The Firebird (Kudelka, 2000)
- The Four Seasons (Kudelka, 1997)
- The Nutcracker (Kudelka, 1995)
- the weight of absence (Dumais, 1998)
- Tristan and Isolde (Alleyne, 2003)
- Vittoria (Kudelka, 1993)

National Ballet of Canada Premieres

- Alice’s Adventures in Wonderland (Wheeldon)
- Approximate Sonata 2016 (Forsythe)
- Chroma (McGregor)
- clearing (Matthews)
- Company B (Taylor)
- Cruel World (Kudelka)
- Daphnis and Chloe (Tetley)
- Désir (Kudelka)
- Episodes (Balanchine)
- In The Upper Room (Tharp)
- Polyphonia (Wheeldon)
- Rooster (Bruce)
- Russian Seasons (Ratmansky)
- Tales of the Arabian Nights: The Story of Abdallah (Bournonville)
- Terra Firma (Kudelka)
- The Concert (Robbins)
- The Rite of Spring (Tetley)
- The Seagull (Neumeier)
- the second detail (Forsythe)
- Waltz pas de deux
- West Side Story Suite (Robbins)

== Teaching and Mentoring ==
Greta Hodgkinson has assumed the role of Artist-in-Residence with the National Ballet of Canada since the company’s 2020-21 season, teaching and coaching performers at the institution.

In 2017, she was invited by choreographer Alexei Ratmansky to stage his version of Romeo and Juliet for the famed Bolshoi Ballet in Moscow, Russia. She was also Stager, Rehearsal Director, and Creative Assistant on Frame by Frame, choreographed by Guillaume Côté, directed by Robert Lepage.

=== Mentoring ===
In 2021, she founded Dance Mentoring by Greta, a comprehensive mentorship program for dancers that aims to address the challenges and demands artists face today and give tools, opportunities, and feedback to help them realize their goals.

Hodgkinson is a judge for international dance competitions worldwide, such as Youth America Grand Prix (Toronto and Indianapolis, 2023). She has served as a peer assessor for Professional Grants Programs. She is a frequent guest speaker for organizations such as Canada’s National Academy of Dance Education Educator’s Conference, the Armenian Relief Society’s INSPIRE women’s event and Providence Healthcare Foundation’s Evening of Inspiration.

=== Teaching ===
Ms. Hodgkinson is extensively engaged in community outreach, teaching master classes within the community at the University of Toronto and in Regent Park, as well as across the country and throughout the United States. She is a member of the guest faculty at Toronto Metropolitan University.

Recent engagements as guest teacher include OnDance (Milan, Italy, 2020), The School of Cadence Ballet (Toronto, Canada, 2020), Ocean State Ballet (Providence, USA, 2022), Ballet RI (Providence, USA, 2023 also: artistic coach), Ocean State Ballet (Providence, USA, 2023), The School of Cadence Ballet (Toronto, Canada, 2023), The National Ballet of Canada (Toronto, Canada, 2023).

=== Apprentice Programme Director ===
On July 16, 2025, Greta Hodgkinson was appointed Apprentice Programme Director at The National Ballet of Canada. "She’s generous with her knowledge, experience and insights into both the company and the art form." Greta said she was excited to mentor the next generation of dancers. “My goal is to provide resources to the young dancers through a robust program inside and beyond the studio. The programme should address more than just learning repertoire to include self-care, how to balance life and work, and help navigating a career.”

== Film and television ==
As an advocate for increasing accessibility in dance, Greta Hodgkinson continues to be involved in numerous projects designed to bring dance to a broader mainstream audience.

In 2001, she took part in The Rings of Saturn, the first contemporary dance drama created and choreographed especially for Canadian television by Moze Mossanen. She would collaborate on many other works directed by Mossanen who made the “decision to make films, not about dance as art, but dance as storytelling." In 2003, she appeared as the Firebird in the televised adaptation of James Kudelka’s ballet based on the mystical Russian folk tale set to Igor Stravinsky’s score. The TV special also featured Aleksandar Antonijevic (Prince Ivan), Rebekah Rimsay (Princess Vasilisa), and Rex Harrington (Kastchei the Demon). In 2004, she was in the filmed New Year’s Concert Gala reopening of the famous La Fenice theatre in Venice, Italy dancing with Roberto Bolle.

In 2009, Hodgkinson portrayed dancer Margot Fonteyn in Moze Mossanen‘s TV movie Nureyev, alongside future husband Etienne Lavigne, who portrayed dancer Erik Bruhn. She also appeared in Moze Mossanen's documentary Romeos & Juliets (2012), which follows 10 dancers from The National Ballet of Canada who prepare for main roles in Alexei Ratmansky's Romeo and Juliet, which was commissioned to celebrate the company's 60th anniversary. Ms. Hodgkinson was one of 12 dancers from around the world to participate in Emerging Pictures' film Ballet's Greatest Hits. She performed excerpts from Giselle, with Matthew Golding as Albrecht and Stella Abrera as Myrtha. The film was presented in over 200 cinemas throughout North America. Other TV appearances include one episode of Opening Night (2001) and one in Baxter (2010), as well as the part of Roxana (2006) in a dramatic dance interpretation of Daniel Defoe's eponymous novel. She was also a guest judge on the Netflix series Blown Away (2018) during their premiere season.

In 2014, Anymotion Productions released a short dance film on-line starring Ms. Hodgkinson titled Being and Nothingness. Directed by Alejandro Alvarez Cadilla, the film was produced in partnership with Crystal Ballet in the United Kingdom. In it, she performs a solo choreographed for her by Guillaume Côté, inspired by Jean-Paul Sartre’s book Being and Nothingness. In 2018, the work was expanded into a ballet for the National Ballet of Canada.

In 2020, Guillaume Côté choreographed the video Portrait of Greta as part of a triptych that can be viewed online.

== Fashion and Photography ==
Greta Hodgkinson has worked with noted photographers Michael Thompson, Febrizio Ferri, Howard Schatz, Nick Krasnaii, Christopher Wahl, Max Abadian, Sian Richards, and Cylla von Tiedemann, among others. Since 1990, she was the subject of over 300 features in international dance and fashion publications as an ambassador for Canadian dance, appearing in Vanity Fair, Lucky, W, GQ Italia, ELLE, NUVO, New York Magazine, Flare and FASHION, Canadian Living, Canadian Family, and Hello! Magazine. She was also on the cover of Dance Magazine (as The National Ballet of Canada's rising star) and Dance International Magazine multiple times. She achieved international recognition through photography representing renowned fashion brands : ECCO Brand Ambassador (2017), Salvatore Ferragamo 80th Anniversary (2008) and GAP Campaign (2007).

== Charities and outreach events ==
Over her 30-year career as a ballerina, Greta Hodgkinson volunteered to perform in fundraising galas, charities and outreach events in Canada that include; special performances for the Winnipeg First Nations community (Winnipeg), The Dancer Transition Resource Centre, Dancers for Life (Aids Committee Fundraiser: Montreal, Toronto, Vancouver), Dreams Come True Benefit Gala, Woodbridge School of Dance 25th Anniversary Gala, benefits for The Artists' Health Centre (Toronto Western Hospital) and the National Chamber Orchestra of Armenia Gala Concert. Internationally, she has appeared at the 80th Anniversary Gala of Salvatore Ferragamo (China), Dance for Life (Belgium), Youth America Grand Prix, various Galas for UNICEF (Italy), Emergency Gala (Italy), and a performance for the International Olympic Committee for the 2006 Torino Olympics (Italy).

Hodgkinson also collaborates with Dancing with Parkinson’s, a charity whose mission is to bring seniors with Parkinson's Disease out of isolation and into an artistic community where they can dance and connect with others, to lead movement workshops and artistic experiences that enriches the lives of people with Parkinson’s Disease, as well as the lives of their families, friends, and caregivers.

She is a Celebrated Ambassador of Plan International since 2009, a global organization dedicated to advancing children’s rights and equality for girls.

Since 2013, Hodgkinson has served on the Board of Directors and Arts Committee of Meagan’s Hug (Meagan Bebenek Foundation), a charity dedicated to raising awareness and valuable funds for paediatric brain tumour research.

== Personal life ==
Hodgkinson became a Canadian citizen and chose Canada as her home to develop as an artist. She is married to Etienne Lavigne, a principal character artist with the National Ballet of Canada as well as the Executive Director of Festival des arts de Saint-Sauveur and Côté Danse. They have two children. She is a dual citizen of United States and Canada. She enjoys hosting dinner parties and going to the movies, where she claims that she never walks out because she likes the entire cinema-going experience. Although she finds the task demanding, Hodgkinson attempts to answer all her fan mail. She says she is flattered when ballet fans take the time to write her.

== Honours and Praise ==
- Selected to represent The National Ballet of Canada at The International Competition for The Erik Bruhn Prize in 1993. With Robert Tewsley, she danced the pas de deux Vittoria, the first role created for her by James Kudelka.
- Winner of the Rolex Dancers’ First Award (2013) "for the breadth of her artistry revealed throughout the 2012/13 season, in such roles as the Queen of Hearts in Alice’s Adventures in Wonderland and the title roles in Giselle and Carmen."
- Nominated for a Dora Mavor Moore Award for her interpretation of Marguerite in Marguerite and Armand (2020)
- Twice voted "Best Performance by a Female Dancer" by Dance Europe for her interpretation of Odette/Odile in Swan Lake, and for Summer in The Four Seasons. "Hodgkinson enchanted, with all the nuances we so often see only in our imagination.” (Bruce Michelson, Dance Europe, 2005)
- Chosen for the cover of James Neufeld's Passion to Dance, the story of The National Ballet of Canada (Dundurn Press, 2011).
- Nominated for the Prix Benois de la Danse for her role as Odette/Odile in James Kudelka's Swan Lake (2000). “Miss Hodgkinson has an awesome balance, an expressive body and a steely technique…” (The Washington Times)
- In 2012, she received two Citations from the State of Rhode Island, in recognition of her extraordinary talents, accomplishments and outstanding contribution to arts and culture in the United States.
- In 2017, Hodgkinson was appointed to the Order of Ontario for exceptional achievement in dance
