= Ekaterina Kondaurova =

Russian ballet dancer

- Born: 20 August 1982 (age 42); Moscow, Russia
- Education: Vaganova Ballet Academy
- Occupation: Ballet dancer
- Career
- Current group: Mariinsky Ballet
- Dances: Swan Lake, La Bayadère, Anna Karenina, In the Middle, Somewhat Elevated, The Firebird, Raymonda

Ekaterina Kondaurova (Russian: Екатерина Кондаурова; born 20 August 1982) is a Russian ballet dancer, currently one of the stars of the Mariinsky Ballet from Saint Petersburg. She is a Merited Artist of the Russian Federation as of 2020.

== Early life ==
Born in Moscow, Kondaurova is the daughter of an optician. She showed an early interest in gymnastics, piano and dance. After she failed to gain admission to the Bolshoi Ballet School, her mother was successful in having her accepted by the Vaganova Academy of Russian Ballet in Saint Petersburg. After graduating in 2001, she immediately joined the Mariinsky.

== Career ==
While on tour to Frankfurt in 2003, Kondaurova was noticed by the choreographer William Forsythe who the following year invited her to dance in the Mariinsky premiere of his In the Middle, Somewhat Elevated. As a result of the excellent reviews she received, she soon starred in other contemporary works by Forsythe, Alexei Ratmansky and Kirill Simonov. Olga Chenchikova, her coach until 2007, ensured her success in classical ballet roles, for example with her personalized interpretation of Nikiya in La Bayadère. Since 2007, her coach has been Elvira Tarasova. Kondaurova has also danced in several of George Balanchine's ballets including Symphony in C and Jewels.

In 2008, Kondaurova married Islom Baimuradov, her frequent Mariinsky dancing partner. She shares his interests in walking, gastronomy and interior decoration. She became a principal dancer at the Mariinsky Ballet in 2012.

Repertoire

- Giselle (Myrtha, Zulma); choreography by Jean Coralli, Jules Perrot, and Marius Petipa
- Le Corsaire (Medora); choreography by Marius Petipa
- La Bayadère (Nikiya, Gamzatti); choreography by Marius Petipa, revised version by Vladimir Ponomarev and Vakhtang Chabukiani
- The Sleeping Beauty (Lilac Fairy); choreography by Marius Petipa, revised version by Konstantin Sergeyev
- The Sleeping Beauty (Lilac Fairy); choreography by Marius Petipa, revised version by Sergei Vikharev
- Swan Lake (Odette-Odile); choreography by Marius Petipa and Lev Ivanov, revised version by Konstantin Sergeyev
- Raymonda (Raymonda, Henrietta, Grand pas); choreography by Marius Petipa, revised version by Konstantin Sergeyev
- Paquita Grand Pas (variation); choreography by Marius Petipa, revised version by Konstantin Sergeyev
- Paquita (Paquita); choreography by Yuri Smekalov
- Don Quixote (Queen of the Dryads, Street Dancer); choreography by Alexander Gorsky
- The Firebird (Firebird); choreography by Michel Fokine
- Scheherazade (Zobeide); choreography by Michel Fokine
- DyinThe Swan; choreography by Michel Fokine
- Prodigal Son (the Siren); choreography by George Balanchine
- Serenade; choreography by George Balanchine
- Symphony in C (Second Movement); choreography by George Balanchine
- The Four Temperaments (Choleric); choreography by George Balanchine
- Jewels (Emeralds, Rubies, Diamonds); choreography by George Balanchine
- La valse; choreography by George Balanchine
- A Midsummer Night's Dream (Titania, Hippolyta); choreography by George Balanchine
- Marguerite and Armand (Marguerite); choreography by Frederick Ashton
- Le jeune homme et la mort (the Girl); choreography by Roland Petit
- The Fountain of Bakhchisarai (Zarema, Maria); choreography by Rostislav Zakharov
- Spartacus (Phrygia, Aegina); choreography by Leonid Yakobson
- Pas de quatre (Marie Taglioni); choreography by Anton Dolin
- The Legend of Love (Mekhemene Banu); choreography by Yuri Grigorovich
- Leningrad Symphony (the Girl); choreography by Igor Belsky
- Romeo and Juliet (Juliet); choreography by Leonid Lavrovsky
- ""Walpurgisnacht" (Nymphs); choreography by Leonid Lavrovsky
- Carmen Suite (Carmen); choreography by Alberto Alonso
- In the Night; choreography by Jerome Robbins
- 5 Tangos; choreography by Hans van Manen
- Simple Things (soloist); choreography by Emil Faski
- Without; choreography by Benjamin Millepied
- La Nuit S'acheve; choreography by Benjamin Millepied
- Steptext; choreography by William Forsythe
- In the Middle, Somewhat Elevated; choreography by William Forsythe
- Approximate Sonata; choreography by William Forsythe
- The Magic Nut (Temptress); choreography by Donvena Pandoursky and Mihail Chemiakin
- The Nutcracker (Queen of the Snowflakes, Oriental Dance); choreography by Mihail Chemiakin and Kirill Simonov
- Cinderella (Stepmother); choreography by Alexei Ratmansky
- The Little Humpbacked Horse (Mare, Sea Princess); choreography by Alexei Ratmansky
- Anna Karenina (Anna); choreography by Alexei Ratmansky
- Concerto DSCH; choreography by Alexei Ratmansky
- Ondine (Queen of the Sea); choreography by Pierre Lacotte
- Le Parc (Soloist); choreography by Angelin Preljocaj
- Gentle Memories; choreography by Jiri Bubenicek
- Sacre; choreography by Sasha Waltz
- Infra; choreography by Wayne McGregor
- The Bronze Horseman (Queen of the Ball); choreography by Yuri Smekalov
- Choreographic Game 3x3; choreography by Anton Pimonov
- Inside the Lines; choreography by Anton Pimonov
- The Cat on the Tree; choreography by Anton Pimonov
- The Four Seasons; choreography by Ilya Zhivoi
- Reverence; choreography by David Dawson
- Le Bourgeois gentilhomme (Marchioness Dorimene); choreography by Nikita Dmitrievsky
- Glass Heart (Alma); choreography by Noah D. Gelber
- SeasonS; choreography by Ilya Zhivoi
- The Dreamers: Within; choreography by Vladimir Varnava
- Motherboard; choreography by Ilya Zhivoi
- Lose Yourself to Dance; choreography by Maxim Petrov and Ilya Zhivoi

== Awards ==
Ekaterina Kondaurova has received the following awards:

- 2006: Prix Benois de la Danse
- 2008: St. Petersburg's Golden Sofit award (Alma, Glass Heart)
- 2010: St Petersburg's Golden Sofit award (Anna Karenina)
- 2011: Golden Mask for her title role in Anna Karenina
- 2011: Recipient of Ballet magazine's Spirit of Dance award in the category “Star”
- 2020: Merited Artist of the Russian Federation
