= Prix Benois de la Danse =

Ballet competition

The Benois de la Danse is a ballet competition held annually in Moscow. Founded by the International Dance Association in 1991, it takes place each year on or around April 29 and it's judged by a jury. The members of this jury change every year and it consists of only top ballet personages.

Statuettes are given to the winners in the categories of lifelong achievement, ballerina, danseur, choreographer, composer and designer.

The Benois de la Danse earns a cash prize of $1,000,000, as well as exceptional events occurring during the previous year on stages around the world. These include dancing roles of all kinds as well as choreographic accomplishments.

== History ==
The idea for the Benois de la Danse was initiated in Moscow and the founders succeeded in obtaining the patronage of UNESCO in the autumn of 1992. Its scheduling at the end of April is meant to coincide with the birthday of the great Alexandre Benois (1870–1960) for whom it is named.

French sculptor Igor Ustinov designed the statuette of the Benois de la Danse award in 1992. He is the son of the famous actor Peter Ustinov, a great-nephew of Alexandre Benois.

== Goals of competition ==
- To give the Benois audience the best performances of the works that have been entered, regardless of whom they were created by.
- To bring the best representatives of different dance styles and schools together.
- To support veterans of ballet financially, with funds from the gala concerts

== Members of the Benois de la Danse jury have included ==
- Alessandra Ferri
- Alexander Grant
- Altynai Asylmuratova
- Claude Bessy
- Brigitte Lefèvre
- Carla Fracci
- Davide Bombana
- Frank Anderson
- Galina Ulanova
- Helgi Tomasson
- Irina Kolpakova
- John Neumeier
- John Taras
- Karen Kain
- Laurent Hilaire
- Loipa Araújo
- Nadia Nerina
- Patrice Bart
- Peter Schaufuss
- Rudi van Dantzig
- Rudolph Nureyev
- Sofia Golovkina
- Yuri Grigorovich
- Yvette Chauviré
- Vladimir Malakhov

== Laureates of the prize ==
=== Composers ===
- George Kouroupos (1996) Greece
- Michel Legrand (2012) France
- Joby Talbot (2015) United Kingdom
- Ilya Demutsky (2018) Russia

=== Designers ===
- Olivier Debré (1998) France
- Jaffar Chalabi (2000) Austria
- Jurgen Rose (2002) Germany
- Carlos Gallardo (2007) Argentina
- John Macfarlane (2015) United States
- Ren Dongsheng (2016) People's Republic of China
- Kirill Serebrennikov (2018) Russia

=== Prix "Benois-Moscow Massine-Positano" ===
- Ana Laguna (2015) Sweden
- Edward Watson (2015) United Kingdom
- Ekaterina Krysanova (2016) Russia
- Maria Kochetkova (2018) United States

=== For High Artistry in Partnership ===
- Alexandre Riabko (2016) Germany

=== Lifetime achievement ===
Name (Nationality)	Year	Country	Company	Training
Alicia Alonso	2000	Cuba	National Ballet of Cuba (after New York City Ballet)	Sociedad Pro-Arte Musical
Rudi van Dantzig	2002	Netherlands	Dutch National Ballet	Anna Sybranda, Sonia Gaskell
William Forsythe ( (United States) )	2002	Germany	Stuttgart Ballet	Joffrey Ballet School
Mikhail Baryshnikov ( (Latvia) )	2003	United States	American Ballet Theatre (after Mariinsky Ballet)	Vaganova Academy
Maurice Béjart	2003	France	Béjart Ballet Lausanne	Paris Opera Ballet School
Marina Semyonova	2003	Russia	Bolshoi Ballet (after Mariinsky Ballet)	Vaganova Academy
Trisha Brown	2005	United States	Trisha Brown Dance Company	Mills College
Hans van Manen	2005	Netherlands	Dutch National Ballet	Sonia Gaskell, Françoise Adret
Mats Ek	2006	Sweden	Cullberg Ballet	
Laurent Hilaire	2007	France	Paris Opera Ballet	Paris Opera Ballet School
Fernando Alonso	2008	Cuba	National Ballet of Cuba (after New York City Ballet)	
Peter Farmer	2010	United Kingdom		
Ohad Naharin	2010	Israel	Batsheva Dance Company	Batsheva Dance Company, Juilliard School & School of American Ballet
Toer van Schayk	2011	Netherlands	Dutch National Ballet	Irail Gadescov, Sonia Gaskell
Pierre Lacotte	2012	France	Paris Opera Ballet	Paris Opera Ballet School
John Neumeier ( (United States) )	2013	Germany	Hamburg Ballet (after Frankfurt Ballet & Stuttgart Ballet)	Vera Volkova, Royal Ballet School
Brigitte Lefèvre	2014	France	Paris Opera Ballet	Paris Opera Ballet School
Sylvie Guillem ( (France) )	2015	United Kingdom	Royal Ballet	Paris Opera Ballet School
John Neumeier ( (United States) )	2016	Germany	Hamburg Ballet	Vera Volkova, Royal Ballet School
Edward Watson	2016	United Kingdom	Royal Ballet	Royal Ballet School
Marcia Haydée	2017	Brazil	Ballet de Santiago	Royal Ballet School, Grand Ballet du Marquis de Cuevas (Monaco)
Natalia Makarova	2018	Russia	Mariinsky Ballet	Vaganova Academy
Jiří Kylián	2019	Czech Republic		

=== Ballerinas ===
Name (Nationality)	Year	Country	Company	Training
Nadezhda Gracheva	1992	Russia	Bolshoi Ballet	Kazakh Ballet School, Moscow State College of Choreography
Isabelle Guérin	1993	France	Paris Opera Ballet	Paris Opera Ballet School
Sylvie Guillem ( (France) )	1994	United Kingdom	Royal ballet	Paris Opera Ballet School
Galina Stepanenko	1995	Russia	Bolshoi Ballet	Bolshoi Ballet Academy
Dominique Khalfouni	1995	France	Ballet National de Marseille (after Paris Opera Ballet)	Paris Opera Ballet School
Diana Vishneva	1996	Russia	Mariinsky Ballet	
Yulia Makhalina	1998	Russia	Mariinsky Ballet	Vaganova Academy
Ulyana Lopatkina	1997	Russia	Mariinsky Ballet	Vaganova Academy
Marie-Claude Pietragalla	1998	France	Paris Opera Ballet	Paris Opera Ballet School
Élisabeth Platel	1999	France	Paris Opera Ballet	Paris Opera Ballet School
Sue Jin Kang ( (South Korea) )	1999	Germany	Stuttgart Ballet	Académie de Danse Classique in Monte Carlo
Julie Kent	2000	United States	American Ballet Theatre	Academy of the Maryland Youth Ballet, School of American Ballet
Alessandra Ferri	2000	Italy	La Scala Theatre Ballet (after Royal Ballet & American Ballet Theatre)	La Scala Theatre Ballet School
Aurélie Dupont	2002	France	Paris Opera Ballet	Paris Opera Ballet School
Anastasia Volochkova	2002	Russia	Mariinsky Ballet	Vaganova Academy
Lucia Lacarra ( (Spain) )	2003	Germany	Bayerisches Staatsballett	Víctor Ullate School of Danse
Alina Cojocaru ( (Romania) )	2004	United Kingdom	Royal Ballet	Kyiv State Ballet School
Svetlana Zakharova ( (Ukraine) )	2005	Russia	Mariinsky Ballet	Vaganova Academy
Marie-Agnès Gillot	2005	France	Paris Opera Ballet	Paris Opera Ballet School
Ekaterina Kondaurova	2006	Russia	Mariinsky Ballet	Vaganova Academy
Kim Joo-won	2006	South Korea	Korea National Ballet	Bolshoi Ballet Academy
Agnès Letestu	2007	France	Paris Opera Ballet	Paris Opera Ballet School
Svetlana Lunkina	2007	Russia	Bolshoi Ballet	Bolshoi Ballet Academy
Tamara Rojo ( (Spain) )	2008	United Kingdom	from Royal Ballet (for the Teatro San Carlo)	Madrid Royal Conservatory of Dance
Silvia Azzoni ( (Italy) )	2008	Germany	Hamburg Ballet	Baletna Skola, Hamburg Ballet School
Natalia Osipova	2009	Russia	Bolshoi Ballet	Bolshoi Ballet Academy
Kirsty Martin	2009	Australia	Australian Ballet	Australian Ballet School
Hélène Bouchet ( (France) )	2010	Germany	Hamburg Ballet	École supérieure de danse de Cannes Rosella Hightower, École Nationale de Danse de Marseille
Bernice Coppieters ( (Belgium) )	2011	Monaco	Ballets de Monte-Carlo	Royal Ballet School of Flanders, Juilliard School
Zhu Yan	2011	China	National Ballet of China	Beijing Dance Academy
Alina Cojocaru ( (Romania) )	2012	United Kingdom	from Royal Ballet (for the Hamburg Ballet)	Kyiv State Ballet School
Olga Smirnova	2013	Russia	Bolshoi Ballet	Vaganova Academy
Polina Semionova ( (Russia) )	2014	United States	American Ballet Theatre	Bolshoi Ballet Academy
Mariko Kida ( (Japan) )	2014	Sweden	Royal Swedish Ballet	San Francisco Ballet School
Svetlana Zakharova ( (Ukraine) )	2015	Russia	Bolshoi Ballet	Vaganova Academy
Alicia Amatriain ( (Spain) )	2016	Germany	Stuttgart Ballet	John Cranko School
Hannah O'Neill ( (New Zealand) )	2016	France	Paris Opera Ballet	Australian Ballet School
Ludmila Pagliero ( (Argentina) )	2017	France	Paris Opera Ballet	Instituto Superior de Arte of Teatro Colón
Maria Riccetto	2017	Uruguay	National Ballet of Uruguay	Uruguay National Ballet School
Sae Eun Park ( (South Korea) )	2018	France	Paris Opera Ballet	Korea National Academy of Ballet
Elisa Carrillo Cabrera	2019	Mexico	Staatsballett Berlin	Instituto Nacional de Bellas Artes y Literatura
Ashley Bouder	2019	United States	New York City Ballet	School of American Ballet
Not Awarded	2020			
Amandine Albisson	2021	France	Paris Opera Ballet	Paris Opera Ballet School
Ekaterina Krysanova	2021	Russia	Bolshoi Ballet	Bolshoi Ballet Academy
Not Awarded	2022			
Misun Kang	2023	South Korea	Universal Ballet, South Korea	
Qiu Yunting	2023	China	National Ballet of China	

=== Danseurs ===
Name (Nationality)	Year	Country	Company	Training
Julio Bocca	1992	Argentina	Ballet Argentino	Instituto Superior de Arte of Teatro Colón
Alexander Kølpin	1992	Denmark	Royal Danish Ballet	Royal Danish Ballet School
Andrei Uvarov	1993	Russia	Bolshoi Ballet	Bolshoi Ballet Academy
Sergei Filin	1994	Russia	Bolshoi Ballet	Bolshoi Ballet Academy
Nicolas Le Riche	1995	France	Paris Opera Ballet	Paris Opera Ballet School
Irek Mukhamedov ( (Russia) )	1996	United Kingdom	The Royal Ballet	Bolshoi Ballet Academy
Vladimir Derevianko ( (Russia) )	1996	Germany	Sächsischen Staatsoper Dresden	Bolshoi Ballet Academy
Gregor Seyffert	1997	Germany	Komische Oper Berlin	Berlin State Ballet School
Farukh Ruzimatov	1997	Russia	Mariinsky Ballet	Vaganova Academy
Manuel Legris	1998	France	Paris Opera Ballet	Paris Opera Ballet School
Vladimir Malakhov ( (Ukraine) )	1998	Germany	Stuttgart Ballet	Bolshoi Ballet Academy
Nikolay Tsiskaridze	1999	Russia	Bolshoi Ballet	Bolshoi Ballet Academy
Jean-Guillaume Bart	2000	France	Paris Opera Ballet	Paris Opera Ballet School
Ángel Corella ( (Spain) )	2000	United States	American Ballet Theatre	Víctor Ullate School of Danse
Jeffrey Gerodias	2002	United States	Alvin Ailey American Dance Theater	Boston Conservatory, The Ailey School
Jiří Bubeníček ( (Czech Republic) )	2002	Germany	Hamburg Ballet	Prague Dance Conservatory
Lukáš Slavický ( (Czech Republic) )	2003	Germany	Bavarian State Ballet	Prague Dance Conservatory
Laurent Hilaire	2004	France	Paris Opera Ballet	Paris Opera Ballet School
Lloyd Riggins ( (United States) )	2004	Germany	Hamburg Ballet	Orlando Southern Ballet School
Mathieu Ganio	2005	France	Paris Opera Ballet	Paris Opera Ballet School
Di Wang	2006	China	from Guangzhou Dance company (for the Nagoya International Ballet and Modern Dance Competition)	Revolutionary Army of China Art College
Leonid Sarafanov	2006	Russia	from Mariinsky Ballet (for the Vienna State Opera Ballet)	Kyiv State Ballet School
Hervé Moreau	2007	France	Paris Opera Ballet	Paris Opera Ballet School
Marcelo Gomes ( (Brazil) )	2008	United States	American Ballet Theatre	Helena Lobato and Dalal Aschcar Ballet Schools
Carlos Acosta ( (Cuba) )	2008	United Kingdom	from The Royal Ballet (for the Bolshoi Ballet)	Cuban National Ballet School
Ivan Vasiliev	2009	Russia	Bolshoi Ballet	Belarusian State Choreographic College
Joaquín De Luz ( (Spain) )	2009	United States	New York City Ballet	Víctor Ullate School of Danse
David Hallberg	2010	United States	American Ballet Theatre	Ballet Arizona School
Thiago Bordin ( (Brazil) )	2010	Germany	Hamburg Ballet	Mannheim Academy of Dance
Fernando Romero	2011	Spain	Lope de Vega Theatre	Manolo Marín Dance School (Academia de Bailie de Monolo Marin)
Rolando Sarabia ( (Cuba) )	2011	United States	Miami City Ballet	Cuban National Ballet School
Semyon Chudin	2011	Russia	Stanislavsky Ballet Company	Novosibirsk State Ballet School
Mathias Heymann	2012	France	Paris Opera Ballet	Paris Opera Ballet School
Carsten Jung	2012	Germany	Hamburg Ballet	Palucca School of Dance, The School of the Hamburg Ballet
Alban Lendorf	2013	Denmark	Royal Danish Ballet	Royal Danish Ballet School
Vadim Muntagirov ( (Russia) )	2013	United Kingdom	English National Ballet	Perm Ballet School, Royal Ballet School
Herman Cornejo ( (Argentina) )	2014	United States	American Ballet Theatre	Instituto Superior de Arte at Teatro Colón
Edward Watson	2015	United Kingdom	The Royal Ballet	Royal Ballet School
Kim Kimin ( (South Korea) )	2016	Russia	Mariinsky Ballet	Korea National University of Arts
Hugo Marchand	2017	France	Paris Opera Ballet	Paris Opera Ballet School
Denis Rodkin	2017	Russia	Bolshoi Ballet	Moscow State Academic Dance Theatre of Dance Gzhel
Isaac Hernández ( (Mexico) )	2018	United Kingdom	English National Ballet	The Rock School for Dance Education
Vladislav Lantratov	2018	Russia	Bolshoi Ballet	Bolshoi Ballet Academy
Vadim Muntagirov ( (Russia) )	2019	United Kingdom	The Royal Ballet	Perm Ballet School, Royal Ballet School
Not awarded	2020			
Jesus Carmona	2021	Spain	Compañia Jesús Carmona	
Not awarded	2022			
Hugo Marchand	2023	France	Paris Opera Ballet	Paris Opera Ballet School

=== Choreographers ===
Name (Nationality)	Year	Country	Company	Training
John Neumeier ( (United States) )	1992	Germany	Hamburg Ballet	Vera Volkova, Royal Ballet School
Jiří Kylián ( (Czech Republic) )	1993	Netherlands	Nederlands Dans Theatre	Prague Dance Conservatory, Royal Ballet School
Roland Petit	1994	France	from Ballet National de Marseille (for the Staatsoper Unter den Linden)	Paris Opera Ballet School
Angelin Preljocaj	1995	France	from Ballet Preljocaj (for the Paris Opera Ballet)	Schola Cantorum
Valentin Elizariev	1996	Belarus	National Academic Bolshoi Ballet of Belarus	Vaganova Leningrad Academic Choreographic School
Carolyn Carlson ( (United States) )	1998	France	from Atelier de Paris-Carolyn Carlson (for the Paris Opera Ballet)	San Francisco Ballet School
Davide Bombana	1998	Italy	from Maggio Danza Company (for Bayerisches Staatsballett)	La Scala Theatre Ballet School
Jiří Kylián ( (Czech Republic) )	1999	Netherlands	Nederlands Dans Theatre	Prague Dance Conservatory, Royal Ballet School
Nacho Duato	2000	Spain	Spanish National Dance Company	Rambert School, Maurice Béjart’s Mudra School, Alvin Ailey American Dance Theater
David Dawson	2003	United Kingdom	Dutch National Ballet	Royal Ballet School
Édouard Lock	2003	Canada	from La La La Human Steps (for the Paris Opera Ballet)	
Paul Lightfoot & Sol León	2004	Netherlands	Nederlands Dans Theatre	
Alexei Ratmansky	2005	Russia	from Bolshoi Ballet (for the Royal Danish Ballet)	Bolshoi Ballet Academy
Boris Eifman	2006	Russia	from Boris Eifman Ballet (for the St Petersburg Ballet Theatre)	Saint Petersburg Conservatory
Martin Schläpfer ( (Switzerland) )	2007	Germany	Ballet Mainz	Royal Ballet School
Jean-Christophe Maillot ( (France) )	2008	Monaco	Ballets de Monte-Carlo	École supérieure de danse de Cannes Rosella Hightower
Wayne McGregor	2009	United Kingdom	Royal Ballet	José Limón School
José Martínez ( (Spain) )	2009	France	Paris Opera Ballet	École supérieure de danse de Cannes Rosella Hightower and Paris Opera Ballet School
Sidi Larbi Cherkaoui and Damien Jalet	2011	Belgium	Eastman Company	Performing Arts Research and Training Studios and Institut National Supérieur des Arts du Spectacle
Jorma Elo ( (Finland) )	2011	United States	from Boston Ballet (for Vienna State Opera Ballet and Stanislavsky Ballet Company)	Finnish National Ballet School, Vaganova Academy
Lar Lubovitch	2012	United States	Lar Lubovitch Dance Company	Juilliard School
Hans van Manen	2013	Netherlands	Dutch National Ballet	Sonia Gaskell, Françoise Adret
Christopher Wheeldon	2013	United Kingdom	Royal Ballet	Royal Ballet School
Alexei Ratmansky ( (Russia) )	2014	United States	American Ballet Theatre	Bolshoi Ballet Academy
Christopher Wheeldon	2015	United Kingdom	Royal Ballet	Royal Ballet School
Inger Johan ( (Sweden) )	2016	Germany	Nederlands Dans Theater	Royal Swedish Ballet School & National Ballet School of Canada
Yuri Possokhov	2016	Russia	Bolshoi Ballet	Bolshoi Ballet Academy
Crystal Pite	2017	Canada	from Kidd Pivot (for the Paris Opera Ballet)	The School of Toronto Dance Theatre
Deborah Colker	2018	Brazil	Deborah Colker Company	
Yuri Possokhov	2018	Russia	Bolshoi Ballet	Bolshoi Ballet Academy

== By categories ==
Number	Country
23	France
21	Russia
16	Germany
11	United States
9	United Kingdom
6	Netherlands
2	Argentina China Cuba; Italy Monaco Spain; South Korea Mexico Brazil
1	Uruguay Australia Austria Belarus Belgium Canada Denmark Greece Israel; Sweden

Number	Country	Laureate's company
16	France	Paris Opera Ballet
10	Russia	Bolshoi Ballet
8	Russia	Mariinsky Ballet
7	Germany	Hamburg Ballet
7	United Kingdom	Royal ballet
5	United States	American Ballet Theatre
4	Netherlands	Dutch National Ballet
3	Netherlands	Nederlands Dans Theatre
3	Germany	Stuttgart Ballet
2	Cuba	National Ballet of Cuba
2	France	Ballet National de Marseille
2	Monaco	Ballets de Monte Carlo

Number	Country	Main training school
20	France	Paris Opera Ballet School
12	Russia	Bolshoi Ballet Academy
9	Russia	Vaganova Academy
5	United Kingdom	Royal Ballet School
4	Spain	Víctor Ullate School of Danse
3	Ukraine	Kyiv State Ballet School
2	Italy	La Scala Theatre Ballet School
2	United States	School of American Ballet
2	France	École supérieure de danse de Cannes Rosella Hightower
2	Germany	Hamburg Ballet School
