= Elisa Carrillo Cabrera =

Mexican ballet dancer

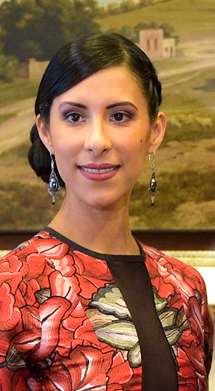
- During meeting with Mexican President (2018)
- Born: 1981 (age 44–45); Texcoco, State of Mexico
- Occupation: ballet dancer
- Years active: 1999-present
- Career
- Current group: Berlin State Ballet; Mexican National Dance Company
- Former groups: Stuttgart Ballet
- Website: elisacarrillocabrera.com

Elisa Carrillo Cabrera (born 1981) is a Mexican classical ballet dancer. She is a co-director of the Mexican National Dance Company and principal dancer with the Berlin State Ballet (since 2011).

== Early life and training ==
Carrillo was born in Texcoco, State of Mexico, and attended the Escuela de iniciación artística número 1, Instituto Nacional de Bellas Artes y Literatura between 1988 and 1990, when she began her studies at the Escuela Nacional de Danza Clásica y Contemporánea, Instituto Nacional de Bellas Artes y Literatura. In 1997, Carrillo moved to the United Kingdom, enrolling at the English National Ballet School until 1999. She was designed a Master of Ballet by the Ministry of Education of the Federal Republic of Germany, after she completed training at the John Cranko Schule Stuttgart, Germany between 2001 and 2003.

== Professional career ==
Carrillo joined the Stuttgart Ballet in 1999 as a member of the corps de ballet. Prior to leaving the troupe in 2007, she was named a soloist. Following her departure from the Stuttgart Ballet, Carrillo joined the Berlin State Ballet as a demi-soloist, becoming principal dancer in 2011.

She is the artistic director of Sir Anton Dolin Foundation.

Carrillo founded the Elisa Carrillo Cabrera Foundation to allow other Mexican dancers opportunities to train abroad, and since 2018, host an annual international dance festival Danzatlán which includes the gala event Elisa y Amigos.

In 2019, she won the Prix Benois de la Danse for Juliet in Nacho Duato's Romeo and Juliet. Carrillo is the second Mexican dancer to be awarded the Benois, after Isaac Hernández won it the previous year. She is also the first Latin American woman to win.

Carrillo has made guest appearances in Paris, Japan, China, USA, Korea, Italy, Cairo, Switzerland, Singapore, Bangkok, Hong Kong and Luxembourg.

Carrillo is the director of the John Cranko School in Stuttgart since 1 January 2026, her husband serving as her deputy.

== Select repertoire ==
Carrillo's repertoire includes:

- La Bayadère - Nikiya, Gamzatti
- Dances at a Gathering - blue
- Don Quixote - Mercedes
- Giselle - Myrtha, Solo-Wilis
- Jewels - Emeralds Pas de deux
- Onegin - Olga
- Paquita - Grand Pas
- Romeo and Juliet (Cranko version) - Juliet, Gypsy
- Romeo and Juliet (Duato version) - Juliet
- Serenade- solo
- The Sleeping Beauty - Jewels, Feé des Lilas
- A Streetcar named Desire
- Swan Lake - Pas de six, four big swans, Spanish princess
- La Sylphide - Solo Sylphide, 1st Sylphide
- Les Sylphides - 1st Sylphide, Demi-solo Sylphide
- Symphony in C
- Theme and Variations - Demi-solo
- The Nutcracker - Arabian dance, Spanish dance
- Sylvia - Sylvia's companion

== Awards ==
- Gold medal and scholarship to study in London Instituto Nacional de Bellas Artes y Literatura, FONCA and English National Ballet School
- Best Duet Award (with Mikhail) at the XII International Ballet Festival Dance Open St Petersburg
- Prix Benois de la Danse 2019
- "Soul of dance" 2019 from the Ministry of Culture of the Russian Federation and the editors of the magazine "Ballet"

== Personal life ==
Carrillo is married to Mikhail Kaniskin, a fellow principal dancer with Berlin State Ballet.
