= Sylvie Guillem =

French ballet dancer (born 1965)

Sylvie Guillem CBE
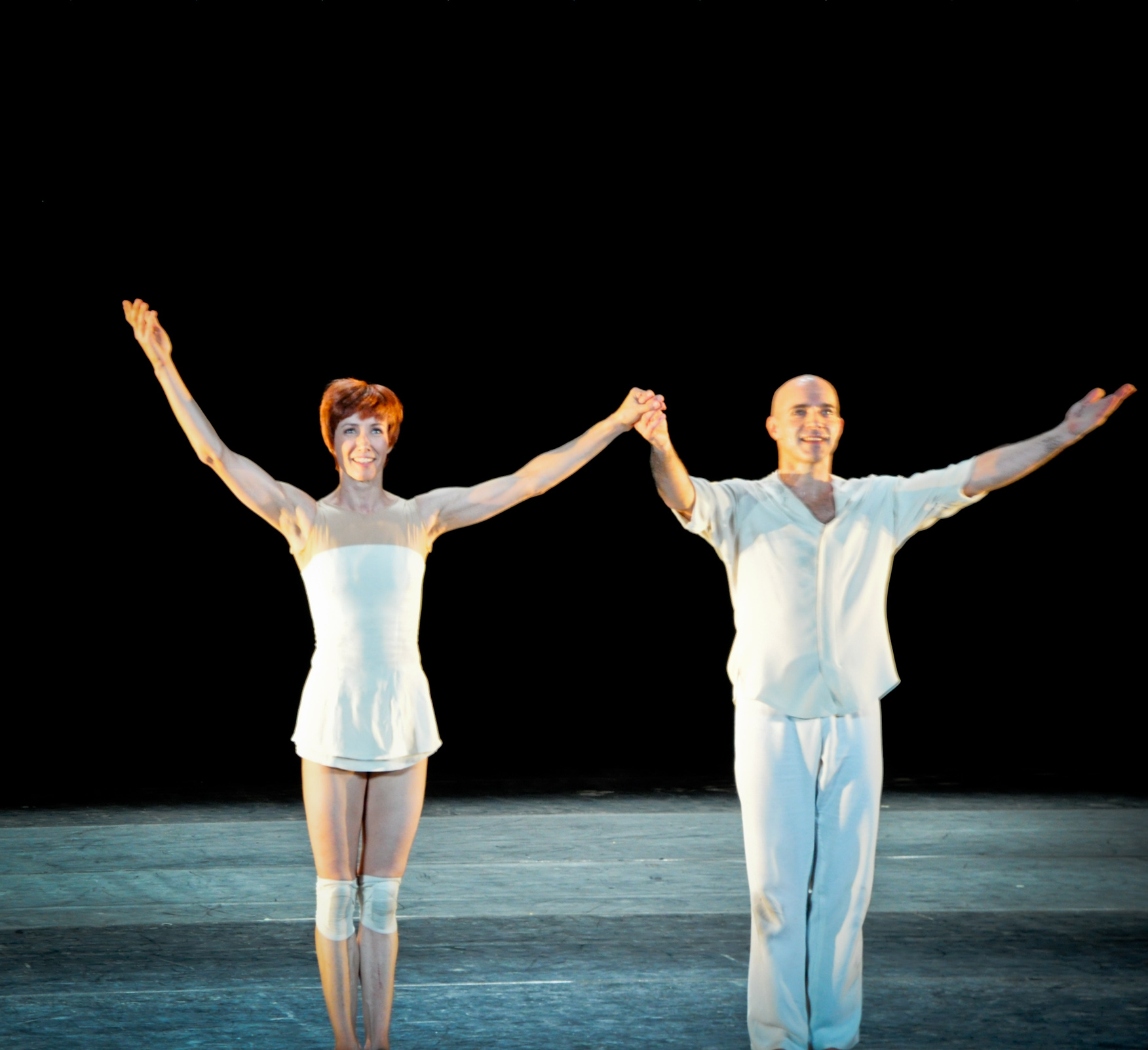
- Guillem and Russell Maliphant in 2010 at the Bolshoi Theatre
- Born: Sylvie Guillem; 23 February 1965 (age 61); Paris, France
- Occupation: Ballet dancer
- Years active: 1984–2015
- Spouse: Gilles Tapie (m. 2006)

Sylvie Guillem CBE (French: [silvi gilɛm]; born 23 February 1965) is a French ballet dancer. Guillem was the top-ranking female dancer with the Paris Opera Ballet from 1984 to 1989, before becoming a principal guest artist with the Royal Ballet in London. She has performed contemporary dance as an Associate Artist of London's Sadler's Wells Theatre. Her most notable performances have included those in Giselle and in Rudolf Nureyev's stagings of Swan Lake and Don Quixote. In November 2014, she announced her retirement from the stage in 2015.

== Biography ==
=== Early life ===
Guillem was born on 23 February 1965 in Paris, and raised in the suburbs in a working-class family. As a child, she trained in gymnastics under the instruction of her mother, a gymnastics teacher. Her father was a car mechanic.

In 1977 at age 11, she began training at the Paris Opera Ballet School where Claude Bessy, then director of the school, immediately noticed her exceptional capacities and potential, and in 1981 at age 16, she joined the company's corps de ballet. Initially she hated dancing, preferring gymnastics, but after taking part in the end-of-term show she found she loved performing, saying: “One foot on stage. Curtain up. That was it...”

=== Career ===
In 1983, Guillem was awarded the Special Prize of the Youth Organization of Varna in junior division at the Varna International Ballet Competition, which later in the year earned her her first solo role, dancing the Queen of the Dryads in Rudolf Nureyev's staging of Don Quixote. On 29 December 1984, after her performance in Nureyev's Swan Lake, she became the Paris Opera Ballet's youngest ever étoile, the company's top-ranking female dancer. In 1987, she performed the lead role in William Forsythe's contemporary ballet In the Middle, Somewhat Elevated with one of her favourite partners, Laurent Hilaire.

In 1988, she was given the title role in a production of Giselle staged by the Royal Ballet to celebrate Nureyev's 50th birthday. Her performance was a success, and in the following year she left Paris for London, to become a freelance performer and one of the Royal Ballet's principal guest artists. Her fierce, independent spirit led Royal Ballet director Anthony Dowell to dub her "Mademoiselle Non", after Nureyev's "Monsieur Non". She was also criticized as "too uncompromising" by Clemente Crisp of the Financial Times and labeled "the Icy Divine" by Vittoria Ottolenghi. Guillem said about her style of dance: “I think my style of acting is different because I try to take away all this superfluous gesture that doesn’t mean anything to me. When I don’t feel something on stage, I prefer not do it than something that is not comfortable. … That’s why for a long time people would say, ‘She’s too cold. She doesn’t show any feeling.’ They said that because they didn’t see what they used to see."

In 1995, Guillem created the dance television program, Evidentia, which won several international awards. In 1998, she staged her own version of Giselle for the Finnish National Ballet, and in 2001 restaged the ballet for La Scala Ballet in Milan.

In 2001, she became the first winner of the Nijinsky Prize for the world's best ballerina, although in her acceptance speech she criticised the "supermarket culture" of such awards. In the same year, she controversially appeared nude and without make-up in a photo-shoot for French Vogue.

In 2003, she directed the central section of a Nureyev tribute program, but was criticised for having the dancers perform in front of a giant projected backdrop of Nureyev, which the audience found distracting. By 2006, she had moved from ballet to contemporary dance, working with such performers as Akram Khan as an Associate Artist of the Sadler's Wells Theatre in London.

In March 2015, Guillem embarked on an international farewell tour titled Life in Progress, featuring works by Khan, Russell Maliphant, Mats Ek and Forsythe.

The tour concluded in Japan, and she gave her final performance live on Japanese television on 31 December 2015, performing Maurice Béjart's Boléro as the clock counted down to midnight local time. The performance ended right at the stroke of midnight local time on 1 January 2016. In 2021, Guillem gave her first interview since retiring to speak about her life and artistry, as part of a talk with Daniil Simkin.

=== Personal life ===
She is a supporter of environmental group Sea Shepherd. In later life she became a vegan. As of 2017, she lives at Villa Guillem, a seven-acre property in the hills of the Lazio region of Italy. The residence includes two restored Italian farmhouses, two art studios, and two acres of olive groves and orchards.

== Repertoire ==
Guillem's repertoire includes Giselle (Giselle), Swan Lake (Odette/Odile), Don Quixote (Kitri), In The Middle, Somewhat Elevated, Romeo and Juliet (Juliet), The Sleeping Beauty (Aurora), Boléro, Cinderella, Notre-Dame de Paris, Raymonda, La Bayadère (Nikiya and Gamzatti), Fall River Legend, Prince of the Pagodas (Princess Rose), Hermann Schmermann, Le Martyre de Saint-Sébastien, and Sacred Monsters (with Akram Khan).

== Awards ==
Guillem has received numerous decorations during her career.

- 1983 : Special Prize of the Youth Organization of Varna at the Varna International Ballet Competition
- 1984 : Prix du Cercle Carpeaux (Paris)
- 1988 : Andersen Prize (Copenhagen), Grand Prix national de danse (Paris), Commandeur of the Arts et Lettres (Paris)
- 1989 : Grand Prix Pavlova
- 1993 : Médaille de Vermeil de la Ville de Paris
- 1994 : Prix Benois de la Danse
- 1994 : Chevalier of the Légion d'honneur
- 1999 : Officier of the Ordre national du Mérite
- 2000 : Gente Dame of honor of the Hospitaliers de Pomerol
- 2001 : Prix Nijinski
- 2003 : Honorary Commander of the Order of the British Empire
- 2009 : Officier of the Légion d'honneur
- 2012 : Golden Lion for Lifetime Achievement, from the Biennale Danza of Venice
- 2015 : Praemium Imperiale, Tokyo
- 2015 : Society of London Theatre Special Award
- 2016 : Critics' Circle National Dance Award: De Valois Award for outstanding achievements
