= Isabelle Guérin =

French ballet dancer (born 1961)

Isabelle Guérin (French pronunciation: [izabɛl ɡeʁɛ̃]; born 1961) is a French ballet dancer. She was a member of the Paris Opera Ballet from 1978. In 1985, she received the title of Danseuse Étoile from Rudolf Nureyev. John Rockwell has described Guérin and Laurent Hilaire as "two of the Opera Ballet's greatest stars". She danced classical and modern repertoires until her retirement in 2001.

== Biography ==
Born in the Paris suburb of Rosny-sous-Bois, Guérin grew up in Rambouillet, and studied ballet at its École de Danse. She continued her studies under Christiane Vaussard at the Conservatoire de Paris where she won the first prize in 1977, allowing her to complete her studies at the Paris Opera Ballet School. She joined the Paris Opera Ballet the following year.

As a quadrille in the corps de ballet, she danced Spring Pas de quatre in Kenneth MacMillan's production of The Four Seasons and Scottish Pas de deux in Pierre Lacotte's production of La Sylphide. Even before she became a soloist, she was given important roles. In 1982, Rosella Hightower chose her as Carabosse in her version of Sleeping Beauty while in 1983, Nureyev gave her the role of Kitri in Don Quixote. Quickly rising through the ranks to become a soloist in 1984, the year she won the silver medal at the Paris Concours International de Danse. In November 1985, together with Laurent Hilaire, she was given the title of étoile (principal dancer) by Rudolf Nureyev after dancing in Vladimir Bourmeister's Swan Lake. She went on to create roles in Nureyev's Cinderella (1986), Jerome Robbins' In the Night, William Forsythe's In the Middle, Somewhat Elevated and Nureyev's La Bayadère (1992) in which she danced Nikiya. In the 1996–97 season, she appeared in three New York City Ballet productions, Swan Lake, The Concert and Other Dances. She left the stage in May 2001 after dancing in MacMillan's L'histoire de Manon.

With Darcey Bussell, Ángel Corella, Desmond Kelly, Violette Verdy, and Edward Villella, Guérin is a member of the advisory board of the En Avant Foundation which promotes classical ballet.

== Awards ==
Isabelle Guérin has received the following awards:

- 1988: Anna Pavlova Prize
- 1993: Prix Benois de la Danse
