= Chloé Lopes Gomes =

French ballet dancer

- Born: Nice, France
- Occupation: Ballet dancer
- Awards: BBC 100 Women (2021)
- Career
- Current group: Staatsballett Berlin

Chloé Lopes Gomes (born c. 1991) is a French ballet dancer known for being the first biracial female dancer from subsaharan African descent in the Staatsballett Berlin.

== Personal life ==
Lopes Gomes was born in Nice, France. Her father is from Cape Verde, and her mother is French and Algerian. She is mixed-race.

== Career ==
Lopes Gomes first took dance lessons at the Conservatoire de Nice. She later trained at Ecole Nationale Supérieure de Danse de Marseille then the Bolshoi Ballet Academy in Russia. She has performed with Opéra de Nice, France, the New English Ballet Theater, and Béjart Ballet in Lausanne, Switzerland.

Lopes Gomes joined the Staatsballett Berlin in 2018, and became their first Black ballet dancer. In 2020, Lopes Gomes' contract was not renewed and she left the Staatsballett Berlin. Lopes Gomes later alleged she was discriminated against because of her race and directed to wear whitening make-up to perform while at Staatsballett Berlin. Staatsballett Berlin conducted an investigation into the claims, later giving out €16,000 to Lopes Gomes and renewed her contract in an out-of-court settlement.

Lopes Gomes was named in BBC's 100 Women 2021.
