= Vladimir Malakhov (dancer) =

Ukrainian ballet dancer (born 1968)

Vladimir Malakhov (born 7 January 1968, Kryvyi Rih, Soviet Ukraine) is a Ukrainian ballet dancer who was the artistic director of the Staatsballett Berlin (Berlin State Ballet) from its founding in 2004 until 2014. He is a former principal dancer with American Ballet Theatre and Vienna State Opera Ballet.

== Career ==
Malakhov began his dance training at the age of four at a small ballet school in his hometown and remained there until continuing his training at the school of the Bolshoi Ballet in Moscow.

From age ten on, he was under the tutelage of Peter Pestov and upon graduation from Moscow State Academy of Choreography in 1986 joined the Moscow Classical Ballet as that company's youngest principal dancer.

In 1992, Malakhov joined the Vienna State Opera Ballet as a principal artist, and then the National Ballet of Canada in 1994. In the spring of 1995 he had his debut with the American Ballet Theatre at the Metropolitan Opera House in New York City. Since that time, he has remained a principal dancer with ABT and has continued to dance principal roles in Vienna as well as with the Stuttgart Ballet.

He appeared as a guest in Berlin where he has recently become artistic director. His repertoire encompasses a wide range of styles from classical ballets to the works of today's contemporary choreographers.

Along with performing at the world’s major dance venues, Malakhov has staged La Bayadere for Vienna State Ballet in 1999, Cinderella in 2004 and The Sleeping Beauty in 2005 for Staatsballett Berlin. In 2010, he choreographed La Péri for Staatsballett Berlin.

He has won awards in his field from competitions in Varna, Moscow and Paris. Japan's Dance Magazine named him the "best male dancer in the world" from 1992 to 1994.

== Roles performed ==
Adam in Creation of the World, Basil and Gamache in Don Quixote, a leading role in Natalie, Romeo and Mercutio in Romeo and Juliet, Prince Siegfried, von Rothbart (at the ABT), Benno, and the Venetian Dance in Swan Lake, Albrecht in Giselle, Lensky in Eugene Onegin, Suite en Blanc, Oberon in A Midsummer Night's Dream, Prince Désiré in The Sleeping Beauty, both the Prince and the Snow King in The Nutcracker, La fille mal gardée, Des Grieux in Manon, Solor in La Bayadère, Fokine's Les Sylphides, Balanchine's Theme and Variations, Kasyan Goleizovsky's Narcissus, Armand in Neumeier's Lady of the Camellias, the title role in Bigonzetti's Caravaggio, and assorted classical pas de deux.

== Awards ==
- 1986: Varna International Ballet Competition (Grand Prize, junior level)
- 1989: Moscow International Ballet Competition (Gold Medal and Serge Lifar Prize)
- 1990: USA International Ballet Competition (Bronze Medal, senior level)
- 1996: Premia Positano di Danza, Italy
- 1992–94: Named "Best Male Dancer in the World" for three consecutive years by Japan's Dance Magazine
- 1998: Prix Benois de la Danse
- 2002: Vaclav Nijinsky Prize, Monaco, Monaco dance Forum

== Television and film ==
Malakhov has been the subject of films and broadcasts such as Bravo Malakhov by Russian Television; Narcisse, the Dancer Malakhov by the European Cultural Network; The True Prince by Canadian Broadcasting Corporation; and Born to Be Wild – The Leading Men of American Ballet Theatre by PBS.

== Other work ==
In 2015, Malakhov joined the Tokyo Ballet as an artistic advisor. In 2022 Malakhov has started a three-year tenure as Professor at the Beijing Ballet Academy.
