= Valentin Elizariev =

Belarusian Soviet balletmaster, choreographer and pedagogue

- Валянцін Елізар’еў
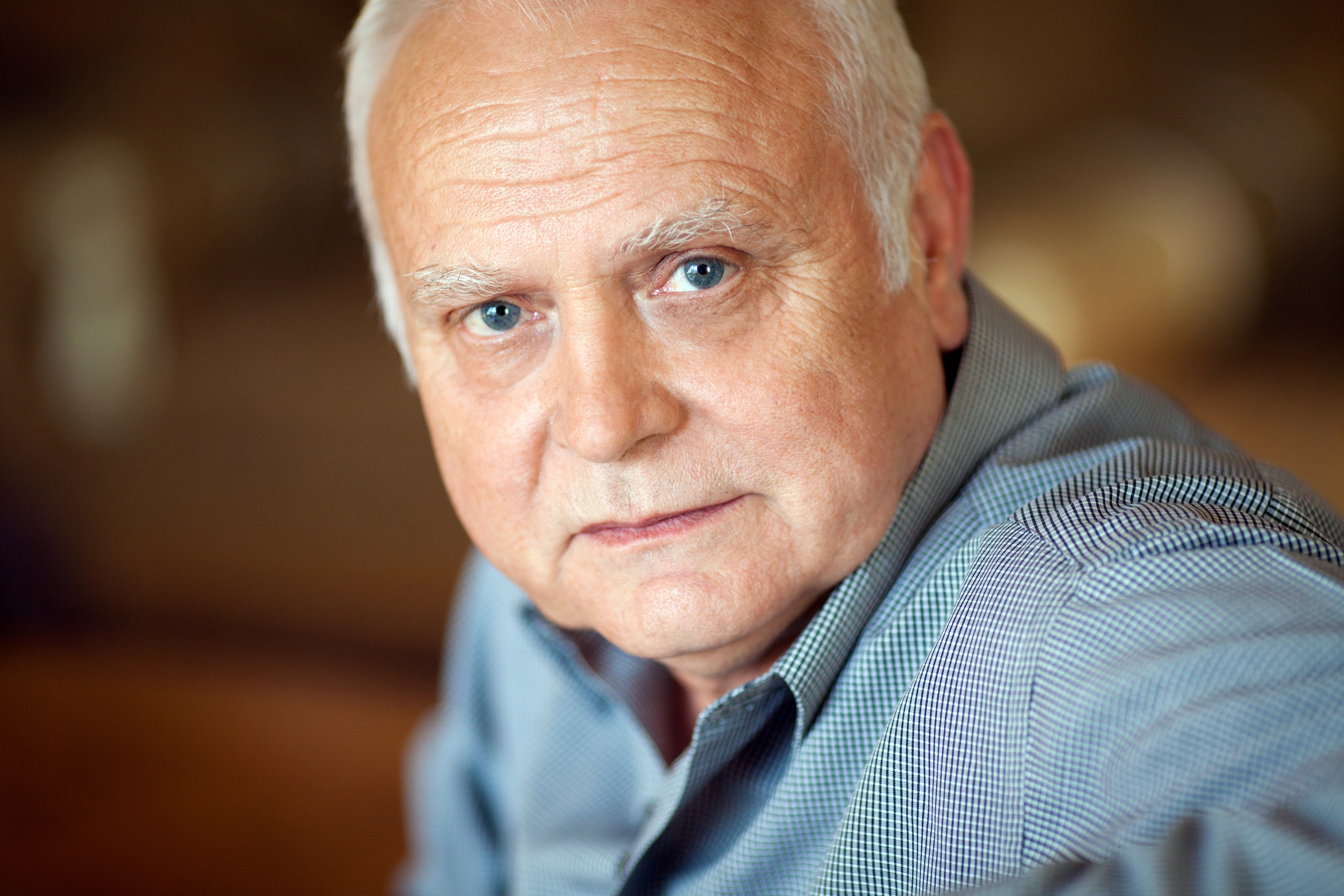
- Elizariev in 2010
- Born: October 30, 1947 (age 78); Baku, Azerbaijani SSR, Soviet Union
- Occupations: Balletmaster, choreographer, pedagogue
- Spouse: Marharyta Mikalayewna Izvorska-Yelizaryeva (m. 1973)
- Children: 2

Valentin Nikolayevich Elizariev (Note: Belarusian: Валянцін Мікалаевіч Елізар’еў, romanized: Valyantsin Mikalayevich Yelizar’’yew; Russian: Валентин Николаевич Елизарьев, romanized: Valentin Nikolayevich Yelizaryev) (born October 30, 1947) is a Belarusian Soviet balletmaster, choreographer, and pedagogue. He was awarded the title of People's Artist of the USSR in 1985.

== Life and career ==
Born on 30 October 1947 in Baku, Azerbaijan SSR, USSR.

In 1967 he has graduated from the Vaganova Leningrad Academic Choreographic School and in 1973 the choreographic department of the Rimsky-Korsakov Leningrad State Conservatory (apprentice of Igor Belsky).

From 1967 to 1967 he has been directing the choreographic group in the "1st Five-Year Plan" Cultural Center in Leningrad.

From 1968 to 1970 he has been directing the dance studio in the Leningrad State University.

In the age of 26, from 1973 onward, Valentin Elizariev became the Chief ballet master. of the Byelorussian State Academic Bolshoi Theatre.

In 1982 he underwent a course in ballet direction in Paris, France with scholarship of UNESCO.

From 1992 to 1996 he holds the position of the artistic director of the Ballet company in the Bolshoi Opera and Ballet Theatre of the Republic of Belarus.

From 1996 to 2009 he occupies the post of the director and the art director of the Ballet Theatre of the Republic of Belarus.

From 1995 on he is a Professor of the Belarusian State Academy of Music.

From 1996 he is a member of the Council of Europe in the sphere of music and a member of the International Slavic Academy (Moscow).

From 1997 he is a member of the Petrine Academy of Science and Arts (St. Petersburg).

From 2000 to 2008 he is a member of the Council of the Republic of the National Assembly of the Republic of Belarus.

From 2018 he is artistic director of the National Academic Bolshoi Opera and Ballet Theatre of the Republic of Belarus.

=== Family ===
- Spouse – Margarita Izvorska-Elizarieva, opera director, Honoured Artist of the Byelorussian SSR, Doctor of Philosophy and Pedagogics, Professor of the Belarusian Academy of Music
- Son- Alexander, daughter-Anna
- Grandchildren- Boyan, Ruslan, Nikita

== Choreographic Stagings ==
=== Bolshoi Opera and Ballet Theatre of the Republic of Belarus ===
- 1974 – Georges Bizet / R. Shchedrin "Carmen Suite"
- 1975 – R. Shchedrin "Chamber Suite"
- 1976 – Andrei Petrov "The Creation of the World"
- 1978 – E. Hlebov "Till Eulenspiegel"
- 1980 – A. Khachaturian "Spartacus"
- 1981 – G. Mahler "Adagietto"
- 1982 – P. Tchaikovsky "The Nutcracker"
- 1983 – C. Orff "Carmina Burana"
- 1984 – M. Ravel "Boléro"
- 1985 – P. Tchaikovsky "Swan Lake"
- 1986 – I. Stravinsky "Le sacre du printemps"
- 1988 – S. Prokofiev "Romeo and Juliet"
- 1989 – L. Minkus "Don Quichote"
- 1995 – A. Mdivani "Passions" ("Rogneda")
- 1997 – I. Stravinsky "Le sacre du printemps" (second edition)
- 1998 – I. Stravinsky "The Firebird"
- 1998 – A. Petrov "The Creation of the World" (second edition)
- 2001 – P. Tchaikovsky "The Sleeping Beauty"
- 2004 – E. Glebov "The Legend of Eulenspigel" (second edition)
- 2007 – B. Asafyev "The Fountain of Bakhchisarai"
- 2017 – Anniversary gala concert "Ballet is the art of thinking"
- 2018 – Sergei Prokofiev Romeo and Juliet (new version)
- Choreographic Miniatures and One-act Ballets: "Contrasts" by R. Shchedrin, "The Way" by Samoilov, "Poem" by A. Petrov and others.

=== Overseas productions ===
- 1973 – A. Petrov's "Immortality" (Moscow Classical Ballet, Russia)
- 1974 – S. Prokofiev's "Classical Symphony" (Moscow Classical Ballet, Russia)
- 1976 – R. Shchedrin's "Moods" (Bolshoi Theater of the USSR, Russia)
- 1977 – E. Glebov's "The Legend of Eulenspiegel" (Kirov Leningrad Opera and Ballet Theatre, Russia)
- 1979 – Valentin Elizariev's Ballets ("Classical Symphony" by S. Prokofiev, "Adagietto" by Mahler, "Carmen Suite" by Bizet-Shchedrin) (Warsaw Bolshoi Theatre, Poland)
- 1990 – A. Adan's "Giselle" (Slovenian Opera and Ballet Theatre, Ljubljana, Yugoslavia)
- 1993 – Minkus "Don Quichote" (Istanbul Opera and Ballet Theatre, Turkey)
- 1995 – A. Khachaturian's "Spartacus" (Ankara Opera Theatre, Turkey)
- 2003 – C. Pugni's "Esmeralda" (NBA Theatre Ballet Company, Tokyo, Japan)
- 2010 – A. Khachaturian's "Spartacus" (Cairo Opera Theatre, Egypt)
- 2011 – Minkus "Don Quichote" (Japan Ballet Association, Tokyo, Japan)
- 2013 – P. Tchaikovsky's "The Swan Lake" (Japan Ballet Association, Tokyo, Japan)

== On the screen ==
- 1975 – "Fantasia" (telefilm-ballet) A. Efros after the novel "Spring waters" by Turgenev (Participating M. PLisetskaya, with a musical selection from Tchaikovsky), Moscow, Central TV.
- 1979 – "Creation" a film by Shevelevitch, Minsk, Byelorussian TV.
- 1987 – "The Return of the 'Spring'" by A. Kanevski, Minsk, Belarusfilm.
- 1990 – "Romeo and Juliet" a video film by N. Lukyanov (Minsk, "BelVideoCenter")
- 1991 – "Don Quichote" a video film by G. Nikolaev (Minsk, "BelVideoCenter")
- 1992 – "Bolero" a video film by G. Nikolaev (Minsk, "BelVideoCenter")
- 1992 – "Carmen Suite" a video film by G. Nikolaev (Minsk, "BelVideoCenter")
- 1992 – "Carmina Burana" a video film by V. Shevelevich (Minsk, "BelVideoCenter")
- 1992 – "The Nutcracker" a TV film by V. Shevelevich (Minsk, "BelVideoCenter")
- 1993 – "Valentine's Day" a video film by V. Shevelevich (Minsk, "BelVideoCenter")
- 1993 – "Spartacus" a video film by V. Shevelevich (Minsk, "BelVideoCenter")
- 1995 – "Passions "Rogneda"" a video film by V. Shevelevich (Minsk, "BelVideoCenter")
- 2000 – "Spartacus" a TV film by V. Shevelevich (Minsk, "BelVideoCenter")
- 2001 – "The Job that's called Composition" a video film by V. Shevelevich (Minsk, "BelVideoCenter", TRO Soyuz)
- 2002 – "Valentin Elizariev" a video film by V. Shevelevich (Minsk, "BelVideoCenter")
- 2003 – "Valentin Elizariev – the Mirror of time" a chronicle documentary by V. Shevelevich (Minsk, "BelVideoCenter")
- 2003 – "Some Stories from the Life of the Choreographer" a video film by V. Shevelevich (Minsk, TRO Soyuz)
- 2008 – "The Shklov Aquafortis" a chronicle documentary by Yu. Tsvetkova (Minsk, "BelVideoCenter")
- 2012 – "Byelorussian Ballet. History" a semidocudrama by O. Lukashevich (Minsk, "BelVideoCenter")
- 2014 – "Rogneda. The Intrigue of the Paris Stage" a TV film by N. Golubeva and T. Kravchenko (Minsk, "Countdown ONT")
- 2014 – Common interest. No. 269 from 09.12.2014 (Intergovernmental TV & Radio company "MIR")
- 2017 – "Panorama with Aizikovich". LLC "Cinemania" on behalf of TRO Soyuza
- 2017 – "Masters and idols. People's Artist of the USSR and Belarus-Valentin Elizariev (Minsk, TV Channel Belarus 3)
- 2017 – Ballet is the art of thinking, documentary. Directed by Aleh Lukashevich and Aleksandr Alekseyev (Minsk, TV Channel Belarus 1)
- 2017 – "Camertone", People's Artist of the USSR Valentin Elizariev (Minsk, TV Channel Belarus 3)
- 2017 – "Valentin Elizariev - about his anniversary, inspiration, present and future of the ballet" (CTV channel)
- 2019 – "Theatre in details. Ballet Romeo and Juliet" (Minsk, TV Channel Belarus 1)

== Awards and titles ==
- Honored Artist of the Byelorussian SSR (1976)
- People's Artist of the Byelorussian SSR (1979)
- People's Artist of the USSR (1985)
- The State Prize of the Byelorussian SSR (1996)
- The Special Award of the President of the Republic of Belarus for the Achievements in the sphere of choreographic art and the Contribution in the development of the foreign relations of the Republic of Belarus (1998, 2001)
- The Order of Friendship of Peoples (1981)
- The Order of Francysk Skaryna (1997)
- The Order of Fatherland 3d Class (2003)
- The Order of Fatherland 2nd Class (2007)
- The Friendship Medal (Vietnam) (1983)
- The Pushkin's Medal (Russia) (2007)
- The All-Soviet Union Ballet Masters' Competition Prize (Moscow. 1972)
- The Best Modern Choreography Prize on the 7th International Ballet Competition (Moscow, Bolshoi Theatre, 1993)
- The Benois de la Dance Prize from the International Dance Association (1996)
- The National Theatre Prize (Minsk, 2011)
- The Crystal Paulinka – the main prize of the Union of the Theatre Workers of Belarus (2012)
- The Certificate of Honor of the Presidium of the Supreme Soviet of the Lithuanian SSR (1976)
- The Certificate of Honor of the Presidium of the Supreme Soviet of the Byelorussian SSR (1983)
- The Certificate of Honor of the Council of the Republic of the National Assembly of Belarus (2007)
- Certificate of Acknowledgement of the President of the Republic of Belarus (2007)
- Certificate of Acknowledgement of the Prime Minister of the Republic of Belarus (2012)
- The Badge of Honor of the Ministry of Culture of the Republic of Belarus "For Significant Contribution in the Development of the Belarusian Culture" (1997)
- A Badge of Ministry of Culture of Belarus "For the Contribution in the Development of Culture of Belarus" (2003)
- The Order of the Ministry of Culture of the Russian Federation "For the Contribution in Russian Culture and Cooperation"
- The title "The Person of the Year" in the sphere of Music Arts and the commitment of the Prize "Golden Nefertiti"
- Honorary Freeman of the City of Minsk (2007)

== Books ==
1. Valentin Elizariev. 30 Years with the National Ballet of Belarus: 1973–2003. A three language edition. Minsk, 'Belarus', 2003.
2. The International Encyclopedia of Dance. Edited by Selma Jeanne Cohen and DANCE PERSPECTIVES FOUNDATION. Oxford University Press. 1998. Print ISBN 9780195173697
3. 『バレエ 誕生から現代までの歴史』 薄井憲二 著 音楽之友社 1999年 ISBN 4-276-25013-7
4. Nikolai Tsiskaridze. Chancellor's diary. 2016–2018. Compiler and editor - G.Petrova (Publishers - Academy of Russian Ballet, Saint-Petersburg, 2018) ISBN 978-5-93010-118-8
