= Impressing the Czar =

Impressing the Czar is a four-act, award-winning, postmodern ballet choreographed by William Forsythe to music by Thom Willems, Leslie Stuck, Eva Crossman-Hecht, and Ludwig van Beethoven. It was premiered in its full-length version in 1988 in Frankfurt am Main by the Ballet Frankfurt.

The work's title is a reference to the Czar Nicholas II's indifferent reception of Marius Petipa's lavish production of The Sleeping Beauty. Impressing the Czar has five sections titled "Potemkin's Signature," "In the Middle, Somewhat Elevated," "La Maison de Mezzo Prezzo," "Bongo Bongo Nageela," and "Mr. Pnut Goes to the Big Top." Though the work has no continuous narrative theme, the ballet comments ironically and often humorously on the history of Western civilization and its economies of culture.

The ballet opens with "Potemkin’s Signature," which is a commentary on the culture and history of ballet. The names of the characters and the plot pieces are full of cultural references.

The second section is the most well known. It is a stand-alone ballet titled "In the Middle, Somewhat Elevated," which was originally created in 1987 for the Paris Opera Ballet, where it was danced by soloists Isabelle Guérin, Sylvie Guillem, Laurent Hilaire, and Manuel Legris. The title of this section refers to two cherries which hang suspended over the stage. One of Forsythe's most famous creations, this work is in the repertory of numerous ballet companies around the world. In 1992, its performance by the Royal Ballet Flanders received the Laurence Olivier Award for Outstanding Achievement in Dance.

The third section, "La Maison de Mezzo-Prezzo," features characters being auctioned off, clothed in gold, as a comment on the commoditization of the arts.

The fourth section, "Bongo Bongo Nageela," is full of energy and bewitchment. A large group of dancer surround Mr. Pnut, whose name headlines the next act and who is portrayed as a Saint Sebastian-type character complete with an arrow in chest. Their circling motion is comparable to a type of folk dance, though not of any particular kind.

"Mr. Pnut Goes to the Big Top" is the final section, bringing the ballet to a dramatic conclusion as the title character of the section blows a party favor toy and the lights go out.
