= Davide Bombana =

Italian choreographer

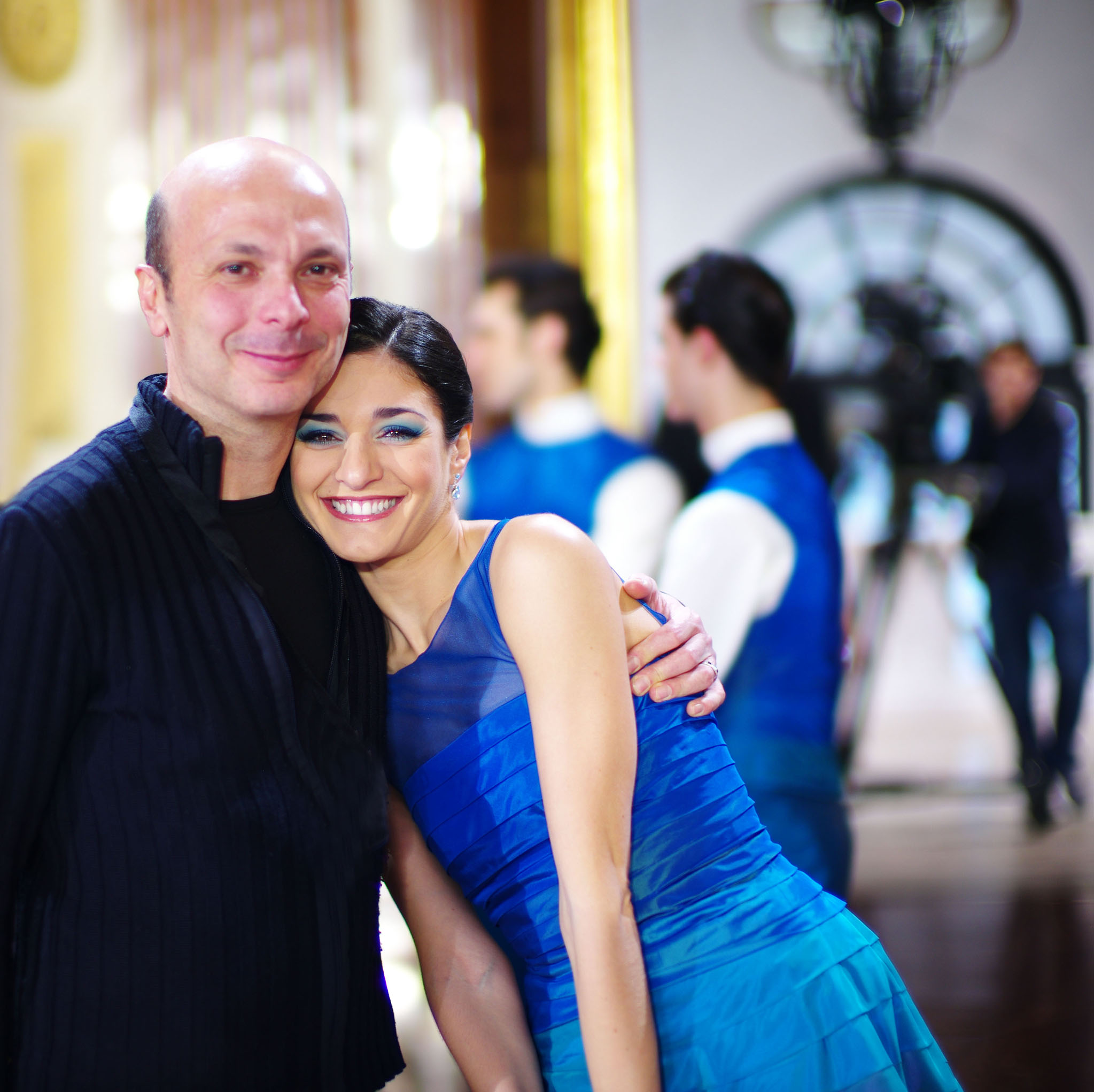
Davide Bombana (left) with dancer Ketevan Papava, 2012

Davide Bombana is an Italian choreographer.

== Career ==
He studied ballet at the Ballet School of La Scala and graduated in 1977. His debut that year, with the La Scala Ballet was in the title role of Béjart's The Firebird. He was promoted to soloist and then principal dancer, performing ballets by Maurice Béjart, Glen Tetley, Rudolf Nureyev, Jerome Robbins, George Balanchine and L. Falco.

He furthered his ballet career at the Pennsylvania Ballet in Philadelphia, the Scottish Ballet in Glasgow, and the London Festival Ballet in London. He also performed in La Scala's production of John Cranko's Romeo and Juliet and Roland Petit's Proust, and has worked at the Bayerisches Staatsballett in Munich as a principal dancer from 1986 to 1991 (and as a choreographer from 1991 to 1998).

In Munich, Bombana's first choreographic world premières took place and included: Sonata, Parabel, Quatour pour la fin du temps, Okanagon, Woyzeck Fragmente inspired by Büchner, Schönberg opus 4 and the two full length ballets Luigi Nono Project and Ein Traumspiel inspired by Strindberg.

In 1998, Bombana was appointed director of the company Maggio Danza in Florence where he restaged Woyzeck Fragmente and Schönberg opus 4 and created the full length ballet Teorema inspired by Pasolini.
