= La Bayadère =

1877 ballet by Marius Petipa

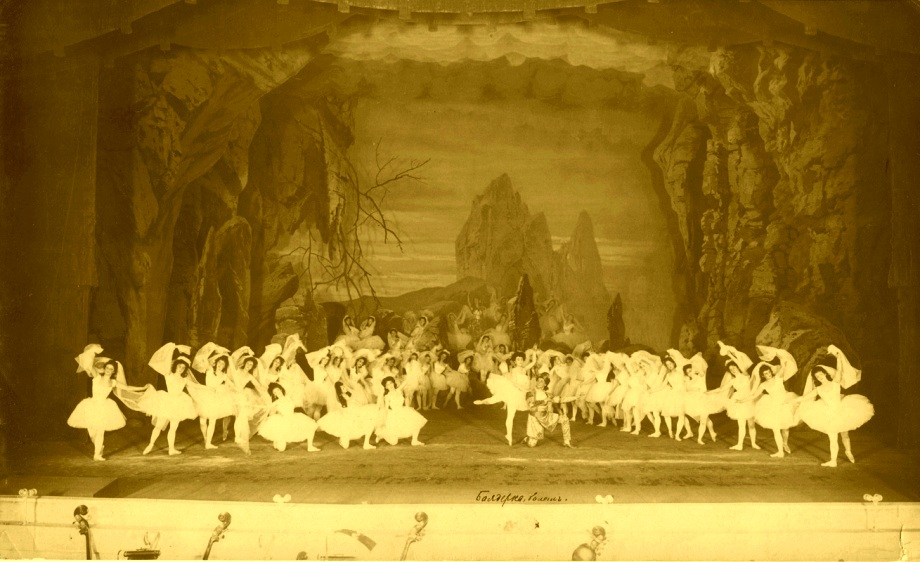
Marius Petipa's final revival of La Bayadère, with the stage of the Mariinsky Theatre shown in the scene The Kingdom of the Shades. In the center is Mathilde Kschessinskaya as Nikiya and Pavel Gerdt as Solor. The three soloist shades are seen kneeling to the left: Varvara Rhykhliakova, Anna Pavlova, and Julia Sedova. St. Petersburg, 1900.

La Bayadère (lit. 'the temple dancer'; Russian: «Баядерка», romanized: Bayaderka) is an 1877 ballet, originally staged in four acts and seven tableaux by the French choreographer Marius Petipa to music by Ludwig Minkus and libretto by Sergei Khudekov. The ballet was staged for the benefit performance of the Russian Prima ballerina Ekaterina Vazem, who created the principal role of Nikiya. La Bayadère was first presented by the Imperial Ballet at the Imperial Bolshoi Kamenny Theatre in St. Petersburg, Russia, on 4 February [O.S. 23 January] 1877. From the first performance the ballet was hailed by contemporary critics and audiences as one of the choreographer Petipa's masterpieces, particularly the scene of act II The Kingdom of the Shades, which is one of the most celebrated pieces in all of classical ballet.

Nearly all modern versions of La Bayadère are derived from Vladimir Ponomarev and Vakhtang Chabukiani's redacted version staged for the Kirov/Mariinsky Ballet in 1941 that has remained in the company's repertory to the present day. Outside of the Soviet Union, Natalia Makarova staged the first full-length production of La Bayadère in 1980 for American Ballet Theatre, a version that is itself derived from Ponomarev and Chabukiani's production of 1947.

== Origins ==
La Bayadère was the creation of the dramatist Sergei Khudekov and of Marius Petipa, the ballet master of the St. Petersburg Imperial Theatres. The music was composed by Ludwig Minkus, who from 1871 until 1886 held the official post of Ballet Composer to the St. Petersburg Imperial Theatres.

=== Plot outline ===
Khudekov's libretto for La Bayadère (meaning The Temple Dancer or The Temple Maiden) tells the story of the bayadère Nikiya and the warrior Solor, who are secret lovers. Solor, with the help of Madhavya, head of the fakirs, arranges to meet Nikiya outside the temple, where the two agree to elope, swearing eternal fidelity to each other over the sacred fire. Their meeting, however, is secretly witnessed by the High Brahmin, who is also in love with Nikiya and has been rejected by her.

Unknown to Nikiya, Solor has been betrothed since childhood to Gamzatti (called Hamsatti in the original production), daughter of the Rajah Dugmanta of Golconda. When the Rajah decides that the time has come for the marriage, he summons Gamzatti to tell her she is to marry Solor and shows her a portrait of her intended husband, which delights her. When the marriage is announced, Solor attempts to refuse the princess's hand, but the Rajah becomes angry and tells Solor that defying his wishes would amount to high treason. Solor is forced to comply.

In his effort to have Solor killed and have Nikiya for himself, the jealous High Brahmin informs the Rajah that the warrior has already vowed eternal love to Nikiya over a sacred fire. The High Brahmin's plan backfires when, rather than becoming angry with Solor, the Rajah decides that Nikiya must die. Horrified, the High Brahmin warns the Rajah that murdering a member of the temple would provoke the wrath of the gods and bring destruction upon the Rajah and his household, but the Rajah refuses to reconsider. Unknown to both men, Gamzatti has overheard the conversation and is stunned to learn that her fiancé loves another woman.

Gamzatti summons Nikiya to the palace and spitefully invites her to dance at her forthcoming wedding before revealing Solor is the bridegroom. Gamzatti begs Nikiya to give Solor up and, when Nikiya refuses, offers her jewels in exchange. Nikiya refuses again, and the confrontation escalates until Nikiya picks up a dagger in a fit of rage and attempts to kill Gamzatti, only to be stopped by Gamzatti's ayah. Nikiya flees in horror at what she has almost done. As did her father, Gamzatti vows that the bayadère must die.

At the betrothal celebrations Nikiya performs a somber dance while playing her veena. She is then given a basket of flowers, which she believes are from Solor, and begins a frenzied and joyous dance. In reality, the basket has been sent by the Rajah and Gamzatti, who have concealed a venomous snake among the flowers. When Nikiya holds the basket close, the snake bites her. The High Brahmin offers her an antidote on the condition that she renounce her love for Solor in favour of him, but Nikiya refuses and dies in Solor's arms, remaining true to her vow and pleading with Solor to remember his.

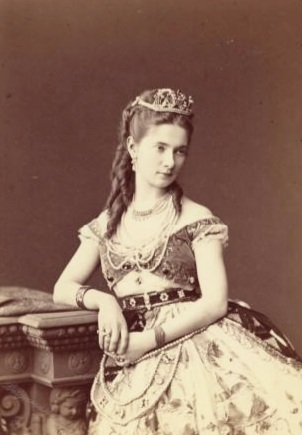
Ekaterina Vazem costumed as Nikiya for Act I of La Bayadère. St. Petersburg, 1877.

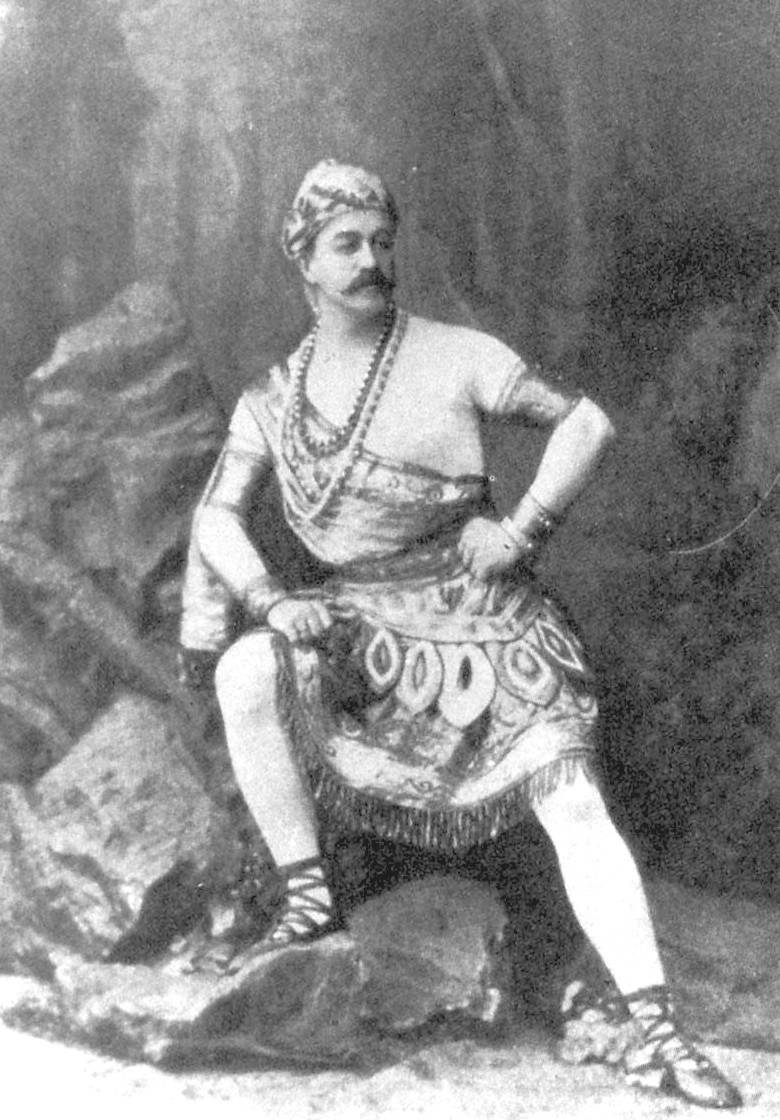
Lev Ivanov costumed as Solor for Act I of La Bayadère. St. Petersburg, 1877.

Tormented by grief and guilt over Nikiya's death and his failure to remain true to his vow, Solor retreats to his room. Gamzatti visits him and unsuccessfully tries to win his affection. Suddenly, the shade of Nikiya appears, weeping, but only Solor can see her. Gamzatti worries that he is going mad, but Solor sends her away as Nikiya's shade continues to haunt him. Solor, exhausted by grief, smokes opium and falls asleep. In his dream-like euphoria he has a vision of Nikiya in nirvana among the star-lit mountain peaks of the Himalayas, in a realm called the Kingdom of the Shades. He begs for her forgiveness and they reconcile among the shades of other bayadères. (In the original 1877 production, this scene took place in an illuminated enchanted palace in the sky.) When the vision ends, Solor is awakened by Madhavya and other warriors, who remind him that the day of his wedding has arrived. He reluctantly follows them.

At the wedding, Solor remains distant and preoccupied by Nikiya, whose shade continues to haunt Solor as he dances with Gamzatti. During the celebrations, Gamzatti is frightened by a basket of flowers that resembles the one used to kill Nikiya, and Nikiya's shade becomes visible to those present. Terrified, Gamzatti urges her father to have the marriage completed. Before the High Brahmin can complete the ceremony, however, the palace is destroyed by an earthquake sent by the angry gods to avenge Nikiya's murder.

The ballet ends with an apotheosis that shows an image of the god Vishnu and the shades of both Nikiya and Solor reunited in death and eternal love.

== Early productions ==
La Bayadère was created especially for the benefit performance of Ekaterina Vazem, Prima ballerina of the St. Petersburg Imperial Theatres. The role of Solor was created by the forty-three-year-old Lev Ivanov, Premier danseur of the St. Petersburg Imperial Theatres, with the classical dances of the character Solor being performed by the younger Pavel Gerdt. The ballerina Maria Gorshenkova created the role of Gamzatti (or Hamsatti, as the character was known in the original production), while the role of the High Brahmin was created by Nikolai Golts. Dugmanta, the Rajah of Golconda was created by Christian Johansson, former Premier danseur of the St. Petersburg Imperial Theatres and an influential teacher. The décor was designed by Mikhail Bocharov for Act I-scene 1; Matvei Shishkov for Act I-scene 2 and Act II; Ivan Andreyev for Act III-scene 1 and Act IV-scene 1; Heinrich Wagner for Act III-scene 2 The Kingdom of the Shades; and Piotr Lambin for the Act IV-scene 2 Apotheosis.

Petipa spent almost six months staging La Bayadère. During rehearsals, Petipa clashed with the Prima ballerina Vazem over the matter of her entrance in the ballet's final Grand pas d'action, while also experiencing many problems with the set designers who constructed the ballet's elaborate stage effects. Petipa was also worried that his new work would play to an empty house, as the Imperial Theatre's Director Baron Karl Kister increased the ticket prices to be higher than that of the Italian Opera, which at that time were expensive. The most celebrated and enduring passage of La Bayadère was Petipa's grand vision scene known as The Kingdom of the Shades. Petipa staged this scene as a Grand pas classique, completely devoid of any dramatic action. His simple and academic choreography was to become one of his most celebrated compositions, with the Sortie des bayadères of the thirty-two member Corps de ballet of shades arguably becoming his most celebrated composition of all.

Petipa's final revival of La Bayadère was first given on 15 December [O.S. 2 December] 1900 for the benefit performance of the Imperial Theatre's Premier danseur Pavel Gerdt, who performed the role of Solor. The Prima ballerina Mathilde Kschessinskaya performed the role of Nikiya, and Olga Preobrajenskaya performed as Gamzatti. Among Petipa's changes for this revival was the re-setting of the scene The Kingdom of the Shades from a brightly lit castle in the sky to a dark and rocky landscape on the peaks of the Himalayas. In this scene Petipa increased the number of dancers in the corps de ballet from thirty-two to forty-eight, making the illusion of descending spirits all the more effective.

In 1894, the Imperial Ballet implemented a project to document the company's repertory in the Stepanov method of choreographic notation. Petipa's 1900 revival of La Bayadère was notated by the Imperial Ballet's régisseur Nikolai Sergeyev as rehearsals were conducted. Nearly the entire ballet was notated in detail.

In March 1903, the scene The Kingdom of the Shades was performed independently during a gala performance at Peterhof Palace in honor of a state visit from Kaiser Wilhelm II. This is the earliest occasion where the scene The Kingdom of the Shades was performed independently.

== Vaganova's revival ==
On December 13, 1932 the great pedagogue of the Soviet Ballet Agrippina Vaganova presented her version of La Bayadère for the Kirov Ballet (the former Imperial Ballet). Vaganova revised the ballerina's dances for her star pupil Marina Semenova, who danced Nikiya. This included triple pirouettes sur la pointe (on the toes), and fast piqué turns en dehors. Although Vaganova's revival did not find a permanent place in the repertory, her modifications to the Ballerina's dances would become the standard.

== The Kirov Ballet's revival of 1941 ==
In 1940 the Kirov Ballet once again made plans to revive La Bayadère, this time in a staging by the Balletmaster Vladimir Ponomarev and the Premier danseur Vakhtang Chabukiani. This version would be the definitive staging of La Bayadère from which nearly every subsequent production would be based. The Ponomarev/Chabukiani revival of La Bayadère premiered on February 10, 1941 to a resounding success, with Natalia Dudinskaya as Nikiya and Vakhtang Chabukiani as Solor.

The choreography for the character of Nikiya went through a renaissance in when performed by the virtuoso ballerina Dudinskaya, whose revisions to the choreography remain the standard. Although her interpretation of the tragic Nikiya was looked on as unsuitable for the stellar ballerina, she nevertheless excelled in The Kingdom of the Shades, where Petipa's strict academic patterns prevailed. In the Variation de Nikiya (often referred to as the Scarf Duet) Ponomarev and Chabukiani changed the original staging of Petipa – originally, this variation called for Nikiya to perform her variation alone, with a long veil connected by wire to a fly-space above the stage, with the veil flying upward upon the final moments of the variation. The variation was changed so that Solor would now hold one end of the veil as Nikiya danced, departing the stage half-way through her solo offstage. Dudinskaya studded the choreography with multiple tours en arabesque, and included, for the first time, airy splits in her Grand jetés during the Entrée de Nikiya, as well as adding fast piqué turns in the Grand coda. The choreography for Solor went through a renaissance as well with the great Premier danseur Chabukiani in the role. Although the dances for the role of Solor had become far more prominent since La Bayadère had been performed in Imperial Russia, Chabukiani's revisions to the choreography would become the standard for all proceeding male dancers.

In 1977, the Kirov Ballet's 1941 Ponomarev/Chabukiani production of La Bayadère was filmed and later released onto DVD/video with Gabriella Komleva as Nikiya, Tatiana Terekhova as Gamzatti, and Rejen Abdeyev as Solor.

== La Bayadère in the West ==
Rudolf Nureyev and Margot Fonteyn in the scene The Kingdom of the Shades as staged for the Royal Ballet, London, 1963.

Although La Bayadère was considered a classic in Russia, the work was almost completely unknown in the west. The first western production of the scene The Kingdom of the Shades was mounted by Eugenia Feodorova at the Teatro Municipal in Rio de Janeiro, Brazil. It premiered on April 12, 1961 with Bertha Rosanova as Nikiya and Aldo Lotufo as Solor. But it was to be the Kirov Ballet's performance of The Kingdom of the Shades at the Palais Garnier in Paris on July 4, 1961 that roused widespread interest in this almost totally unknown ballet from the Imperial/Petipa repertory. Two years later, Rudolf Nureyev staged the scene for the Royal Ballet with Margot Fonteyn as Nikiya. Minkus's music was re-orchestrated by the Royal Opera House's composer/conductor John Lanchbery. The premiere was a resounding success, and is considered to be among the most important moments in the history of ballet.

The dance critic Arlene Croce commented on Petipa's The Kingdom of the Shades in her review of Makarova's staging of the scene in The New Yorker:

... Motor impulse is basic to Petipa's exposition of movement flowing clean from its source. It flows from the simple to the complex, but we are always aware of its source, deep in the dancer's back, and of its vibration as it carries in widening arcs around the auditorium. This is dancing to be felt as well as seen, and Petipa gives it a long time to creep under our skins. Like a patient drillmaster, he opens the piece with a single, two-phrase theme in adagio tempo (arabesque cambré port de bras), repeated over and over until all the dancers have filed onto the stage. Then, at the same tempo, with the dancers facing us in columns, he produces a set of mild variations, expanding the profile of the opening image from two dimensions to three. Positions are developed naturally through the body's leverage – weight, counterweight. Diagonals are firmly expressed ... The choreography is considered to be the first expression of grand scale symphonism in dance, predating by seventeen years Ivanov's masterly designs for the definitive Swan Lake ... The subject of The Kingdom of the Shades is not really death, although everybody in it except the hero is dead. It's Elysian bliss, and its setting is eternity. The long slow repeated-arabesque sequence creates the impression of a grand crescendo that seems to annihilate all time. No reason it could not go on forever ... Ballets passed down the generations like legends, acquire patina of ritualism, but La Bayadère is a true ritual, a poem about dancing and memory and time. Each dance seems to add something new to the previous one, like a language being learned. The ballet grows heavy with this knowledge, which at the beginning had been only a primordial utterance, and in the coda it fairly bursts with articulate splendor.

Nureyev's version of The Kingdom of the Shades was also staged by Eugen Valukin for the National Ballet of Canada, premiering on March 27, 1967. The first full-length production of La Bayadère was staged by the Balletmistress Natalie Conus for the Iranian National Ballet Company in 1972, in a production based almost entirely on the 1941 Ponomarev/Chabukiani production for the Kirov Ballet. For this production Minkus' score was orchestrated from a piano reduction by Robin Barker.

The National Ballet of Panama's debut performance was La Bayadère (1972), the principal dancers were Teresa Mann, Ginela Vazquez, Armando Villamil, Nitzia Cucalon, Raisa Gutierrez and Alejandro Lugo.

== Natalia Makarova's production ==
The Royal Swedish Ballet in Natalia Makarova's production of La Bayadère. Pictured here is the final moment of the Grand coda from the Grand pas d’action. Stockholm, 2007. Photo by Mats Bäcker.

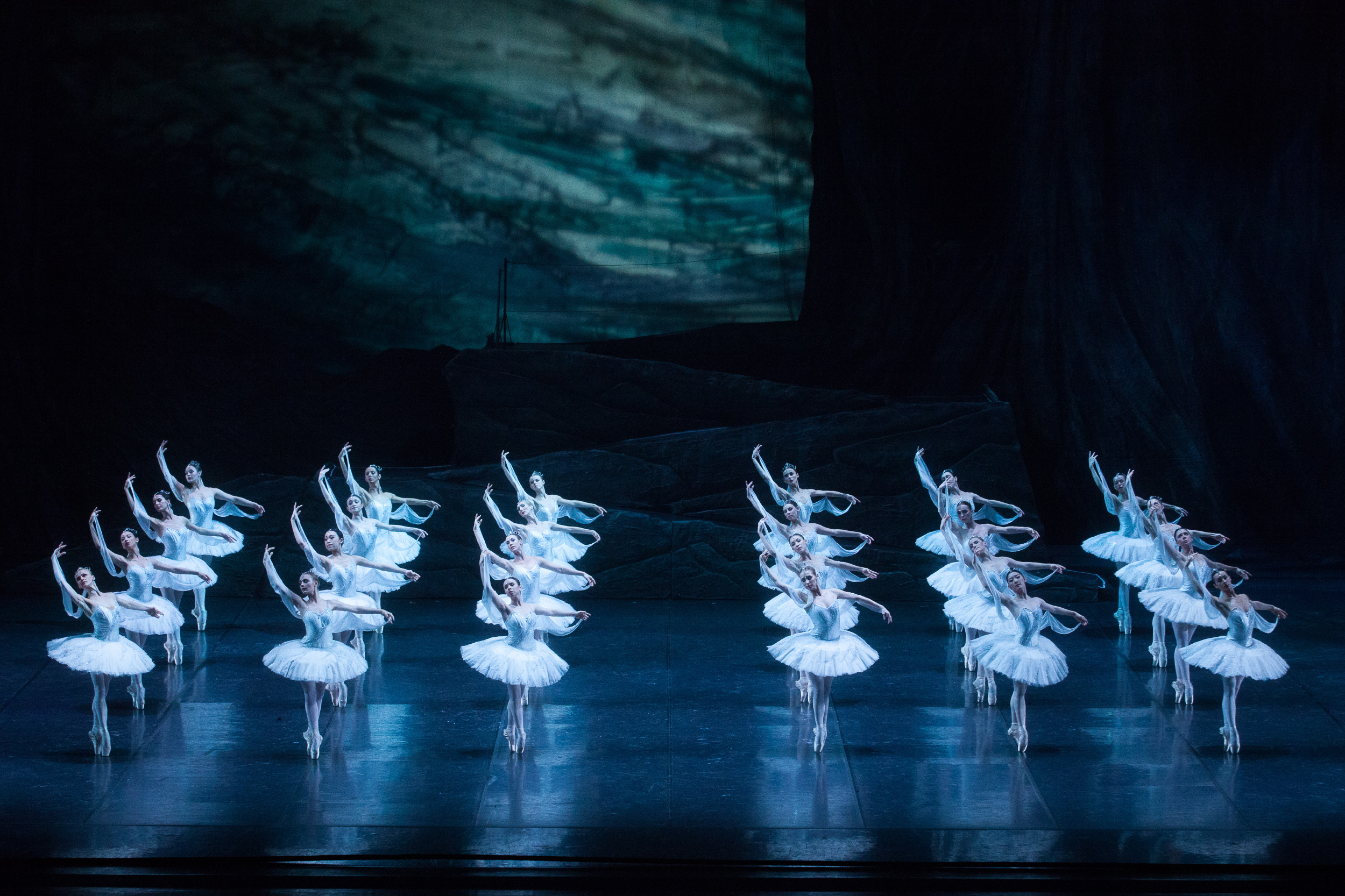
Polish National Ballet in Natalia Makarova's production of La Bayadère, Warsaw 2016. Photo by Ewa Krasucka

In 1974 Natalia Makarova mounted The Kingdom of the Shades for American Ballet Theatre in New York City, being the first staging of any part of La Bayadère in the United States. In 1980 Makarova staged her own version of the full-length work for the company, based largely on the Ponomarev/Chabukiani version she danced during her career with the Kirov Ballet. Makarova's production premiered on May 21, 1980 at the Metropolitan Opera House, and was shown live on PBS during the Live from Lincoln Center broadcast. Makarova danced the role of Nikiya herself, but was replaced by Marianna Tcherkassky due to an injury during the first act. The principal roles included Anthony Dowell as Solor, Cynthia Harvey as Gamzatti, Alexander Minz as the High Brahmin and Victor Barbee as the Rajah. The décor was designed by Pier Luigi Samaritani, with costumes by Theoni V. Aldredge and lighting by Toshiro Ogawa. The premiere was a triumph for American Ballet Theatre, and the company has performed it consistently ever since.

In 1989, Makarova staged her version of La Bayadère for the Royal Ballet in a totally un-changed production, including copies of Samaritani's designs for the décor, and new costumes by Yolanda Sonnabend. In 1990 her production was filmed, and later shown on PBS in 1994 and later released onto DVD/Video. The cast included Altynai Asylmuratova as Nikiya, Darcey Bussell as Gamzatti and Irek Mukhamedov as Solor. Makarova has since staged her production for many companies throughout the world, including the Ballet of La Scala (who have recently filmed their production and released it onto DVD), the Australian Ballet, the Polish National Ballet, the Stanislavsky Ballet in Moscow and the Royal Swedish Ballet.

== Rudolf Nureyev's production ==
In late 1991, Rudolf Nureyev, artistic director of the Paris Opera Ballet, began making plans for a revival of the full-length La Bayadère, to be derived from the traditional Ponomarev/Chabukiani version he danced during his career with the Kirov Ballet. Nureyev enlisted the assistance of his friend and colleague Ninel Kurgapkina, former Prima Ballerina of the Kirov Ballet, to assist in staging the work. The administration of the Paris Opéra knew that this production of La Bayadère would be Nureyev's last offering to the world, as his health was deteriorating more and more from advanced AIDS disease. Because of this, the cultural administration of the Paris Opéra gave the production an enormous budget, with even more funding coming from various private donations.

Nureyev called upon the Italian opera designer Ezio Frigerio to create the décor, and his wife, opera designer Franca Squarciapino, to create the ballet's costumes. Frigerio took inspiration from the Taj Mahal and the architecture of the Ottoman Empire, as well as drawings of the original décor used for Petipa's 1877 production – Frigerio called his designs "a dream of the Orient through Eastern-European eyes". Squarciapino's costume designs were inspired by ancient Persian and Indian paintings, with elaborate head-dresses and hats, colorful shimmering fabrics, and traditional Indian garb, with much of the materials coming from Parisian boutiques that imported directly from India.

Nureyev's production of La Bayadère was presented for the first time at the Palais Garnier (or the Paris Opéra) on October 8, 1992, with Isabelle Guérin as Nikiya, Laurent Hilaire as Solor, and Élisabeth Platel as Gamzatti (and was later filmed in 1994 and released onto DVD/video with the same cast). The theatre was filled with many of the most prominent people of the ballet world, along with throngs of newspaper and television reporters from around the world. The production was a resounding success, with Nureyev being honored with the prestigious Ordre des Arts et des Lettres from the French Minister of Culture. The premiere of Nureyev's production was a special occasion for many in the world of ballet, as only three months later he died.

The danseur Laurent Hilaire later commented on Nureyev's revival:

... the premiere of La Bayadère was more than a ballet for Rudolf and everybody around. This is the idea that I love about La Bayadère — that you have someone approaching death, who is dying, and instead of his death, he gives us this wonderful ballet.

== Sergei Vikharev's production ==
In 2000 the Kirov/Mariinsky Ballet began mounting a new production of Petipa's 1900 revival of La Bayadère.

The choreographer Sergei Vikharev made use of the Stepanov Choreographic Notation from the Sergeyev Collection to assist on mounting the choreography. The production included the long deleted final act, which included the lost Danse des fleurs de lotus (Dance of the Lotus Blossoms) and Petipa's original Grand Pas d'action, which up to that point had been performed during the second act in a revised edition from 1941 as staged by Vladimir Ponomarev and Vakhtang Chabukiani. In spite of the fact that the production was billed as a "reconstruction", Vikharev retained nearly all of the Soviet-era choreography.

For the majority of the 20th century Minkus's original score for La Bayadère was thought to have been lost. Unbeknownst to the company, the Mariinsky Theatre's music library had in their possession two volumes of Minkus's complete, hand-written score of 1877, as well as three manuscript rehearsal répétiteurs in arrangement for two violins, which included many notes for ballet masters and performers. Sergei Vikharev commented on the restoration of Minkus's score:

... this is a return to the source. The true, original Minkus (score) was preserved in the theatre's archives. It was difficult to restore the score as the music had been split up. We basically had to check each hand-written page to determine the correct order, because the music had been moved around in the library so many times that if it had been reorganized once more it would have been impossible to find anything. We were fortunate in being able to restore Minkus's full score for this ballet.

The Kirov/Mariinsky Ballet opened the 10th International Stars of the White Nights Festival with their reconstruction of La Bayadère at the Mariinsky Theatre on May 31, 2002, with Daria Pavlenko as Nikiya, Elvira Tarasova as Gamzatti, and Igor Kolb as Solor. The production received a mixed reaction from the St. Petersburg audience, which largely comprised the most prominent persons of the Russian ballet. The celebrated Ballerina of the Kirov/Mariinsky Ballet Altynai Asylmuratova was seen weeping after the performance, allegedly because of her shock at seeing the ballet presented in this way. When the company included the production on their tours, it caused a sensation around the world, particularly in New York and London. To date the Kirov/Mariinsky Ballet only perform the Vikharev production on special occasions.

== Other productions ==
Among other notable productions is Vladimir Malakhov's staging of La Bayadère for Vienna State Opera in 1999, for Staatsballett Berlin in 2002, and for Hong Kong Ballet in 2023.

== Ekaterina Vazem on the first production of 'La Bayadère' ==
Here is an account by Ekaterina Vazem, Soloist of His Imperial Majesty and Prima Ballerina of the St. Petersburg Imperial Theatres, on the first production of La Bayadère.

My next new part was that of the Bayadère Nikiya in La Bayadère, produced by Petipa for my benefit performance at the beginning of 1877. Of all the ballets which I had the occasion to create, this was my favorite. I liked its beautiful, very theatrical scenario, its interesting, very lively dances in the most varied genres, and finally Minkus' music, which the composer managed especially well as regards melody and its coordination with the character of the scenes and dances. I associate with La Bayadère the recollection of a clash with Petipa at rehearsal ... We came to rehearsals for the last act. In it Solor is celebrating his wedding to the Princess Hamsatti, but their union is disrupted by the shade of the Bayadère Nikiya, murdered at the bride's wish so that she could not prevent them from marrying. Nikiya's intervention is expressed in the context of a Grand Pas d'action with Solor, Hamsatti, and soloists, among whom the Bayadère's shade suddenly appears, though visible only to her beloved Solor.

Petipa began to produce something absurd for my entrance as the shade, consisting of some delicate, busy little steps. Without a second thought I rejected the choreography, which was not with the music, nor did it match the general concept of the dance – for the entrance of Nikya's shade who is appearing amidst a wedding celebration, something more imposing was required than these minimally effective trifles which Petipa had thought up. Petipa was exasperated – in general the last act was not going well for him, and he wanted to finish the production of the ballet that day no matter what. He produced something else for me in haste, still less successful. Again I calmly told him that I would not dance it. At this he lost his head completely in a fit of temper: "I don' unnerstan what you need to danse?! Yew can't danse one, yew can' danse other! What kin' of talent are yew if yew can' danse noseeg?!" Without saying a word, I took my things and left rehearsal, which had to be cut short as a result.

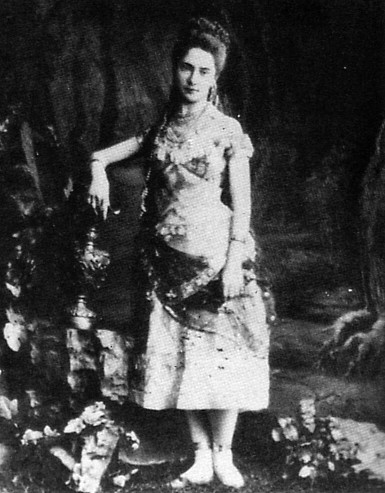
Ekaterina Vazem costumed as Nikiya for Act I of La Bayadère. St. Petersburg, 1877.

The next day, as if nothing had happened, I again took up with Petipa the matter of my entrance in the last act. It was clear that his creative imagination had quite run dry. Hurrying with the completion of the production, he announced to me: "If yew can' danse sometheeg else, then do wha' Madame Gorshenkova does." Gorshenkova, who danced the princess Hamsatti, was distinguished by her extraordinary lightness, and her entrance consisted of a series of high grand jetés from the back of the stage to the footlights. By proposing that I dance her steps Petipa wanted to "needle" me: I was an "earthly" Ballerina, a specialist in complex, virtuoso dances, and in general did not possess the ability to "fly". But I did not back down. "Fine" I answered, "but for sake of variety I will do the same steps not from the last wing but from the first wing". This was much more difficult because it was impossible to take advantage of the incline of the stage (which was raked) to increase the effect of the jumps. Petipa responded "As yew weesh Madame, as yew weesh." I must add that at preparatory rehearsals I never danced, limiting myself to approximations of my dances (or "marking") even without being dressed in ballet slippers. Such was now the case – during this rehearsal I simply walked about the stage among the dancers.

The day came with the first rehearsal with the orchestra in the theatre. Here of course I had to dance. Petipa, as if wishing to relieve himself of any responsibility for my steps, said to the artists over and over again: "I don' know wha' Madame Vazem will danse, she never danse at reheasals." Waiting to make my entrance, I stood in the first wing, where a voice within me spurred me on to great deeds — I wanted to teach this conceited Frenchman a lesson and demonstrate to him clearly, right before his eyes what a Talent I truly was. My entrance came, and at the first sounds of Minkus' music I strained every muscle, while my nerves tripled my strength — I literally flew across the stage, vaulting past the heads of the other dancers who were kneeling there in groups, crossing the stage with just three jumps and stopping firmly as if rooted to the ground. The entire company, both on stage and in the audience, broke out into a storm of applause. Petipa, who was on stage, immediately satisfied himself that his treatment of me was unjust. He came up to me and said "Madame, forgive me, I am a fool."

That day word circulated about my "stunt". Everyone working in the theatre tried to get into the rehearsal of La Bayadère to see my jump. Of the premiere itself, nothing needs to be said. The reception given me from the public was magnificent. Besides the last act, we were all applauded for the scene The Kingdom of the Shades, which Petipa handled very well. Here the grouping and dances were infused with true poetry. The Balletmaster borrowed drawings and groupings from Gustave Doré's illustrations from Dante's The Divine Comedy. I had great success in this scene in the Danse du Voile to Minkus' violin solo played by Leopold Auer. The roster of principals in La Bayadère was in all respects successful: Lev Ivanov as the warrior Solor, Nikolai Golts as the High Brahmin, Christian Johansson as the Rajah Dugmanta of Golconda, Maria Gorshenkova as his daughter Hamsatti, and Pavel Gerdt in the classical dances – all contributed much to the success of La Bayadère, as did the considerable efforts of the artists Wagner, Andreyev, Shishkov, Bocharov, and especially Roller (who designed the décor), with Roller distinguishing himself as the machinist of the masterful destruction of the temple at the end of the ballet.

== Sources ==
- American Ballet Theatre. Program for Natalia Makarova's production of La Bayadère. Metropolitan Opera House, 2000.
- Beaumont, Cyril. Complete Book Of Ballets.
- Croce, Arlene. Review titled "Makarova's Miracle", written August 19, 1974, republished in Writing in the Dark, Dancing in 'The New Yorker' (2000) p. 57.
- Greskovic, Robert. Ballet 101.
- Guest, Ivor. CD Liner Notes. Léon Minkus, arr. John Lanchbery. La Bayadère. Richard Bonynge Cond. English Chamber Orchestra. Decca 436 917-2.
- Hall, Coryne. Imperial Dancer: Mathilde Kschessinska and the Romanovs.
- Imperial Mariinsky Theatre. Yearbook of the Imperial Theatres 1900–1901. St. Petersburg, Russian Empire. 1901.
- Kschessinskaya, Mathilde Felixovna (Princess Romanovsky-Krassinsky). Dancing in St. Petersburg – The Memoirs of Kschessinska. Trans. Arnold Haskell.
- Kirov/Mariinsky Ballet. Souvenir program for the reconstruction of Petipa's 1900 revival of La Bayadère. Mariinsky Theatre, 2002.
- Petipa, Marius. The Diaries of Marius Petipa. Trans. and Ed. Lynn Garafola. Published in Studies in Dance History. 3.1 (Spring 1992).
- Petipa, Marius. Memuary Mariusa Petipa solista ego imperatorskogo velichestva i baletmeistera imperatorskikh teatrov (The Memoirs of Marius Petipa, Soloist of His Imperial Majesty and Ballet Master of the Imperial Theatres).
- Royal Ballet. Program for Natalia Makarova's production of La Bayadère. Royal Opera House, 1990.
- Stegemann, Michael. CD Liner notes. Trans. Lionel Salter. Léon Minkus. Paquita & La Bayadère. Boris Spassov Cond. Sofia National Opera Orchestra. Capriccio 10 544.
- Vazem, Ekaterina Ottovna. Ekaterina Ottovna Vazem – Memoirs of a Ballerina of the St. Petersburg Imperial Bolshoi Kamenny Theatre, 1867–1884. Trans. Roland John Wiley.
- Wiley, Roland John. Dances from Russia: An Introduction to the Sergeyev Collection Published in The Harvard Library Bulletin, 24.1 January 1976.
- Wiley, Roland John, ed. and translator. A Century of Russian Ballet: Documents and Eyewitness Accounts 1810–1910.
- Wiley, Roland John. Tchaikovsky's Ballets.
