= Berlin State Ballet =

German ballet company

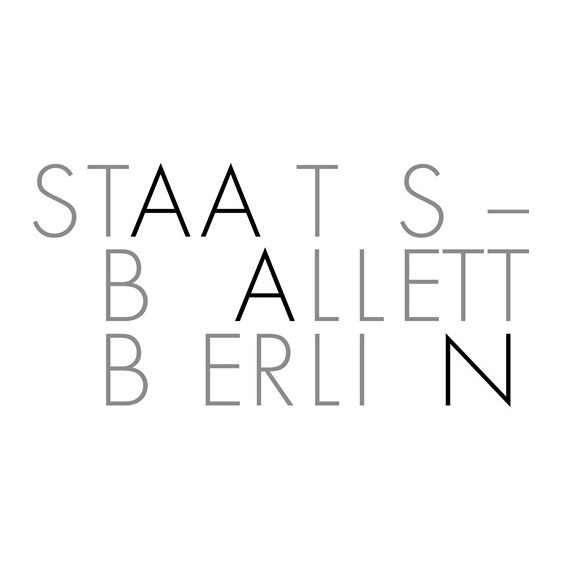

The Berlin State Ballet (German: Staatsballett Berlin) is the principal ballet company in the German capital of Berlin. It was created in 2004 through a merger of the separate ballet companies of the city's three opera houses at a time when the city was going through a financial crisis. It is one of the largest ballet companies in Western Europe with approximately 90 dancers.

Since 2004, the Berlin State Ballet, alongside the Berlin State Opera, the Deutsche Oper Berlin, the Komische Oper Berlin comprise the Berlin Opera Foundation. The Berlin State Ballet inaugural general and artistic director, dancer and choreographer Vladimir Malakhov, was a director of the ballet of the Berlin Opera before the companies merged to form the Berlin State Ballet. He led the company for ten years, creating a mixed repertoire of classical titles and contemporary choreography. A star dancer himself, Malakhov was not only managing, but also performing with the company.

== Leadership ==
In 2014, Nacho Duato became general and artistic director at the Berlin State Ballet with an initial five years term. He created new choreography for the company, and oversaw restagings of some of his signature ballets, created in Madrid, St. Petersburg and Munich, in Berlin. In 2016, Michael Müller, Mayor of Berlin, announced that the city will not extend Duato's contract with the company when it expires in 2019.

For the 2018/19 season, Johannes Öhman took over as Director of the Staatsballett Berlin. For the 2019/20 season, Öhman was joined by Sasha Waltz in a co-directorship. Christiane Theobald took over as provisional artistic director in August 2020. Christian Spuck followed as permanent artistic director from the 2023/24 season.

== Ensemble 2025/2026 ==
=== Principal dancers ===
*Principal Guest Artist

Name	Nationality	Training	Other companies (inc. guest performances)
Weronyka Frodyma	Poland	Ballet School Warsaw School of American Ballet	Polish National Ballet
Martin ten Kortenaar	Canada	Canada's National Ballet School	National Ballet of Canada Dutch National Ballet
Haruka Sassa	Japan	Houston Ballet's Ben Stevenson Academy	Tokyo City Ballet Theatre Dortmund Royal Swedish Ballet Norwegian National Ballet
Iana Salenko*	Ukraine	Pysarev Ballet School, Donetsk	English National Ballet
Polina Semionova*	Russia	Bolshoi Ballet Academy	American Ballet Theatre
David Soares	Brazil	Regina and Ofelia Corvello Ballet School Bolshoi Ballet Academy	Bolshoi Ballet

=== Soloists ===
- Alexandre Cagnat
- Jan Casier
- Aurora Dickie
- Matthew Knight
- Meiri Maeda
- Danielle Muir
- Murilo de Oliveira
- Alexei Orlenco
- Rafaelle Queiroz
- Kalle Wigle
- Michelle Willems

=== Demi-Soloists ===
- Cohen Aitchison-Dugas
- Emma Antrobus
- Alexander Bird
- Bruna Cantanhede
- Marina Duarte
- Mark Geilings
- Gregor Glocke
- Julia Golitsina
- Sarah Hees-Hochster
- Cameron Hunter
- Cécile Kaltenbach
- Marina Kanno
- Andrea Marino
- Ross Martinson
- Fiona McGee
- Leroy Mokgatle
- Jisoo Park
- Loïck Pireaux
- Eloïse Sacilotto
- Vera Segova
- Alizée Sicre
- George Susman
- Anthony Tette
- Clotilde Tran
- Dominic Whitbrook
- Shuailun Wu

=== Corps de Ballet ===
- Bárbara Andrade
- Jessica Beardell
- Matthys De Beer
- Giacomo Beraldo
- Paulina Rosa Blum
- Yoko Callegari
- Chloe Capulong
- Filipa Cavaco
- Gustavo Chalub
- Ailin Cheliktash
- Poppy Florence Downing
- Grégoire Duchevet
- Timothy Dutson
- Jack Easton
- Victor Gomes
- Suren Grigorian
- Achille De Groeve
- Désirée Guler
- Wolf Hoeyberghs
- Mari Kawanishi
- Vivian Assal Koohnavard
- Riccardo Mambelli
- Yuka Matsumoto
- Jordan Mullin
- Minori Nakashima
- Filippo Pagani
- Blanka Paldi
- GIovanni Princic
- Alicia Ruben
- Renée Spaltenstein
- Erick Swolkin
- Lewis Turner
- Olmo Verbeek Martínez
- Wei Wang
- Inara Wheeler
- Dominik White Slavkovský

=== Character Dancers ===
- Martina Böckman
