= Laurent Hilaire =

French ballet dancer (born 1962)

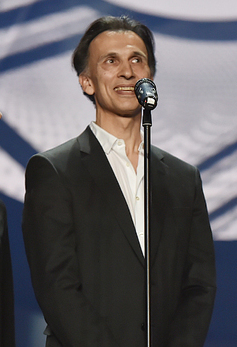
- Born: 8 November 1962 (age 63); France
- Occupations: ballet dancer, ballet master, artistic director
- Years active: 1979–present

Laurent Hilaire (French pronunciation: [lɔʁɑ̃ ilɛʁ]; born 8 November 1962) is a French ballet dancer. Regarded as one of the greatest dancers to emerge from ballet over the past few decades, he was an étoile of the Paris Opera Ballet for 22 years. From 2011, he was the associate artistic director of the Paris Opera Ballet and a ballet master with the company from 2005 to 2014. In 2017, he became the director of dance at Stanislavski and Nemirovich-Danchenko Theatre. He resigned in February 2022 over the Russian invasion of Ukraine. In May, he was appointed the new director at Bavarian State Ballet.

== Career ==
Hilaire joined the Paris Opera Ballet school in 1975 and entered the company's corps de ballet in 1979, aged 17. On 2 November 1985, he was promoted to etoile (a top-billing principal dancer) by Rudolf Nureyev after a performance of Swan Lake.

Laurent Hilaire became a ballet master with the company in 2005, occasionally performing as an etoile until he made his farewell performance on 14 February 2007. For it he performed George Balanchine's Apollo and Maurice Béjart's Song of A Wayfarer, in which he was partnered by Manuel Legris. After his farewell performance Hilaire was awarded Commander of Ordre des Arts et des Lettres, the highest rank of the order.

He is a head of the jury at the Prix de Lausanne ballet competition in 2025.

== Notable awards ==
- Officer of Ordre des Arts et des Lettres 1998
- Male Dancer, Benois de la Danse 2004
- Chevalier of Legion of Honour 2004
- Commander of Ordre des Arts et des Lettres 2007
- Lifetime Achievement, Benois de la Danse 2007
