= Grand Kyiv Ballet =

Ukrainian ballet touring company

General information
- Name: Grand Kyiv Ballet
- Year founded: 2014
- Founding artistic director: Oleksandr Stoianov
- Website: www.grandkyivballet.com.ua/en/

The Grand Kyiv Ballet, also called Kyiv Grand Ballet or Kiev Grand Ballet, is an independent touring ballet company of Ukrainian ballet dancers from Kyiv temporarily operating from the International Ballet Academy in Bellevue, Washington, USA while in refuge from the Russian invasion of Ukraine.

== Background ==
=== Origin ===
The Grand Kyiv Ballet was founded in 2014 by Oleksandr Stoianov, a premiere of the National Ballet of Ukraine, beginning with a French tour of 35 theaters, with a troupe consisting of approximately 35 performers.

=== Prominent members ===
This group includes dancers who have performed in the National Opera of Ukraine. Stoianov is the founder, artistic director, and principal dancer of the group. Stoianov's wife, Katerina Kukhar, is a principal dancer of the National Opera of Ukraine, and of the Grand Kyiv Ballet. Both Stoianov and Kukhar are graduates of the Kyiv State Choreographic College. Stoianov has been awarded the title, "Honored Artist of Ukraine" by the government of Ukraine. Kukhar is the head of Kyiv State Choreographic College and has been awarded the honorary title, "People's Artist of Ukraine" by the government of Ukraine.

=== Activities during war ===
Kukhar said their family had been in Kyiv on February 24, 2022, and became refugees during the Russian invasion of Ukraine.

In December, 2023, Stoianov told media that many of the performers of the Grand Kyiv Ballet use the money they earn through their performances to support their families in Ukraine.

Grand Kyiv Ballet works to support ballet dancers from Ukraine find places to train around the world, estimating they have helped more than 200 ballet children. In October 2023, Kukhar expressed the importance of providing an opportunity for Ukrainian dancers to continue their careers following the destruction of many theaters in Ukraine, to share Ukrainian culture, and collecting funds to provide support to Kyiv State Ballet College.

== Projects ==
In 2023, the Grand Kyiv Ballet's website listed their projects as:

- The Forest Song
- The Snow Queen
- Children of the Night
- Don Quixote
- Giselle
- Carmen Suite
- Spartacus
- Snow White and the Seven Dwarves
- The Sleeping Beauty
- The Nutcracker
- Romeo and Juliet
- Swan Lake

== Tour history ==
- In spring 2023, the group toured Europe, New Zealand, and the United States performing a two act production. The first act was a ballet version of the Ukrainian work, The Forest Song, and the second act a ballet version of Don Quixote.
- In fall 2023, the group toured the United States, performing Snow White and the Seven Dwarves.
- In spring 2024, the group toured the United States, performing Giselle.

== National Opera of Ukraine statement ==
In January, 2023, the National Opera of Ukraine, based in Kyiv, issued a statement that independent companies with names similar to the Grand Kyiv Ballet do not represent the National Opera. The statement also said that the similarly-named independent ballet company, Kyiv City Ballet, a ballet company founded in 2012 by Ivan Kozlov, does not represent the NOU either.

In their statement, the National Opera of Ukraine emphasized their disagreement over performances of Russian composer Tchaikovsky's works, The Nutcracker and Swan Lake, during Russia's invasion of Ukraine. This opinion is not universally shared in the Ukrainian music community, with others emphasizing Tchaikovsky's connection to Ukraine including Tchaikovsky's Ukrainian heritage, Ukrainian influences on Tchaikovsky's music, and Tchaikovsky's time spent in Ukraine.

== See also ==
- Kyiv City Ballet
- National Ballet of Ukraine
- Odesa Opera and Ballet Theatre
- National Opera of Ukraine
- Ukrainian Dance
