= Rayssa =

Rayssa is a given name. Notable people with the name include:

- Rayssa Costa (born 1991), Brazilian fencer
- Rayssa Furlan (born 1987), Brazilian politician
- Rayssa Leal (born 2008), Brazilian skateboarder

== See also ==
- Raisa (disambiguation)
- Raissa (disambiguation)
