= Kyiv State Choreographic College =

Ballet school in Kyiv, Ukraine

Kyiv State Choreographic College, also called Kyiv State Ballet College (sometimes Kyiv State Ballet School), is associated with the National Ballet of Ukraine, and was established in 1949, with its first graduation in 1951. The school had begun in 1934 as a children's ballet studio within the Kyiv Opera House.

== History ==
=== Beginning ===
Started as a children's ballet studio within the Kyiv Opera House in 1934 by Leonid Zhukov. In 1935, it became a three-year choreographic technical school, in 1938 was reorganized into a seven-year school, and in 1940 became a ten-year school. In 1941 it was given the name Kyiv State Choreographic School. Following the conclusion of war in 1944, it operated first as a department of a music school named after Mykola Lysenko, then in 1949 was designated as an independent educational institution for the training of classical ballet artists. The first graduating class consisted of 18 students, with the qualification "ballet artist."

=== Early history ===
In the period 1961–1962, 60 graduates of the school received four year diplomas certifying them as instructors. In 1966, a boarding school was opened at the school to permit enrollment of students from across Ukraine. Also in 1966, Antonina Vasiliev became the school's artistic director, during which time the school was initiating contact with schools in other countries. In the period 1973–1991, the school graduated 274 individuals as folk dance ensemble artists. Students and graduates often performed at the Kyiv Opera House.

=== Modern era ===
The school now confers bachelor level choreographic degrees.

=== Teaching method ===
The school has traditionally used the Vaganova method of Soviet ballet training.

=== Fundraising ===
Kateryna Kukhar, an artistic director at the school, has performed with the Grand Kyiv Ballet to raise funds for the school.

== Artistic Directors ==
Artistic directors of the school include:

- 1937 - 1941: BORIS TAIROV, Honored Artist of the Ukrainian SSR
- 1944 - 1966: ALINA BEREZOVA, Honored Artist of the Ukrainian SSR
- 1966 - 1972: ANTONINA VASILYEVA, People 's Artist of the Ukrainian SSR
- 1972 - 1986: GALINA KIRYLOVA, People 's Artist of the Ukrainian SSR, People's Artist of Ukraine
- 1987 - 1989: Volodymyr Petrin
- 1989 - 1993: TETYANA TAYAKINA, People 's Artist of the Ukrainian SSR, laureate of the State Prize of the Ukrainian SSR named after T.G. Shevchenko, the Anna Pavlova Prize of the French Academy of Dance
- 2010 - 2011: DMYTRO KLYAVIN, Honored Artist of Ukraine
- 2011 - 2012: HANNA KUSHNEREVA, People's Artist of Ukraine
- 2012-2020: NOBUHIRO TERADA, People's Artist of Ukraine
- 2020–present: OLEKSIY BEZSMERTNYI, director of the TanzOlymp festival in Berlin, ballet master
- 2020–present: KATERYNA KUKHAR, People's Artist of Ukraine
- 2022–present: SERHIY BONDUR, People's Artist of Ukraine

== Notable instructors and staff ==
- Kateryna Kukhar, People's Artist of Ukraine
- Oleksandr Shapoval, Honored Artist of Ukraine

== Notable graduates ==
- Alla Lagoda (1955)
- Teodor Popescu (1957)
- Valentina Kalinovska (1957)
- Eleonora Steblyak (1959)
- Svitlana Kolivanova (1959)
- Valery Kovtun (1965)
- Raisa Khylko (1968), People's Artist of Ukraine
- Tetyana Tayakina (1969)
- Lyudmila Smorgacheva (1969)
- Mykola Pryadchenko (1968)
- Hanna Kushneryova (1975)
- Tetyana Borovyk (1975)
- Nina Semizorova (1975)
- Iryna Brodska (1980)
- Tetiana Beletska (1982)
- Serhii Bondur (1982)
- Mykola Mikheev (1983)
- Maksym Motkov (1987)
- Elena Philipieva (1988), People's Artist of Ukraine
- Tetiana Golyakova (1992)
- Nobuhiro Terada (1993)
- Alina Cojocaru (1997)
- Kateryna Kukhar (1999), People's Artist of Ukraine
- Natalia Matsak (2000), Honored Artist of Ukraine
- Oleksandr Stoyanov (2006), Honored Artist of Ukraine
- Artem Datsyshyn, soloist with the National Opera of Ukraine

== See also ==
- Honored Artist of Ukraine
- People's Artist of Ukraine
