= Raisa (given name) =

Raisa or Raissa is a female personal name. It is popular in Russia and South Asia (as a feminine form of Rais). It was also a historically typical female name amongst Jews of the Russian Empire, as a Hebrew and Yiddish origin variant. In Yiddish, Raisa is derived from the word "roiz", meaning “rose”.

Notable people named Raisa include:

- Raisa Akhmatova, internationally recognized Chechen poet
- Raisa Andriana, Indonesian singer
- Raisa Belskikh, Russian agronomist
- Raisa Blokh, Russian poet
- Raisa Bogatyrova, Ukrainian politician
- Raisa Sergiyevna Dankovskaya, Ukrainian and Russian ethnographer, museologist, folklorist and archivist
- Raisa Gorbacheva, wife of former Soviet leader Mikhail Gorbachev and a fundraiser for preservation of Russian heritage
- Raissa Khan-Panni, English singer
- Raisa Khylko, Ukrainian ballet dancer
- Raisa Kyrychenko, Ukrainian mezzo-soprano singer and music teacher
- Raissa Maritain, Russian-French philosopher and poet
- Rayisa Nedashkivska, Ukrainian and Soviet-era theater and cinema actress
- Raisa Orlova, Soviet/Russian writer and Americanist
- Raisa Smekhnova, former Soviet/Belarusian long-distance runner
- Raisa Smetanina, former Soviet/Russian Nordic skiing champion
- Raisa Surnachevskaya, Soviet World War II fighter pilot
- Raisa Treñas, Filipino businesswoman and politician

== Fictional ==
- Raisa Pöttgen, a character from the second season of the anime Strike Witches
- Raissa Molina, one of the main protagonists alongside Jo in the 2026 DreamWorks Animation film Forgotten Island.

== See also ==
- Francia Raisa, American actress
- Miss Raisa, rapper
- Rosa Raisa, soprano
