= Raisa =

Raisa may refer to

- Raisa (given name)
- Raisa (surname)
- Raisa (album) by Raisa Andriana
- Raisa (film), a 2015 Romanian short film
- Raisa (singer), an Indonesian singer-songwriter
