= Théâtre du Châtelet =

Theatre and opera house in Paris, France

- Théâtre Musical de Paris
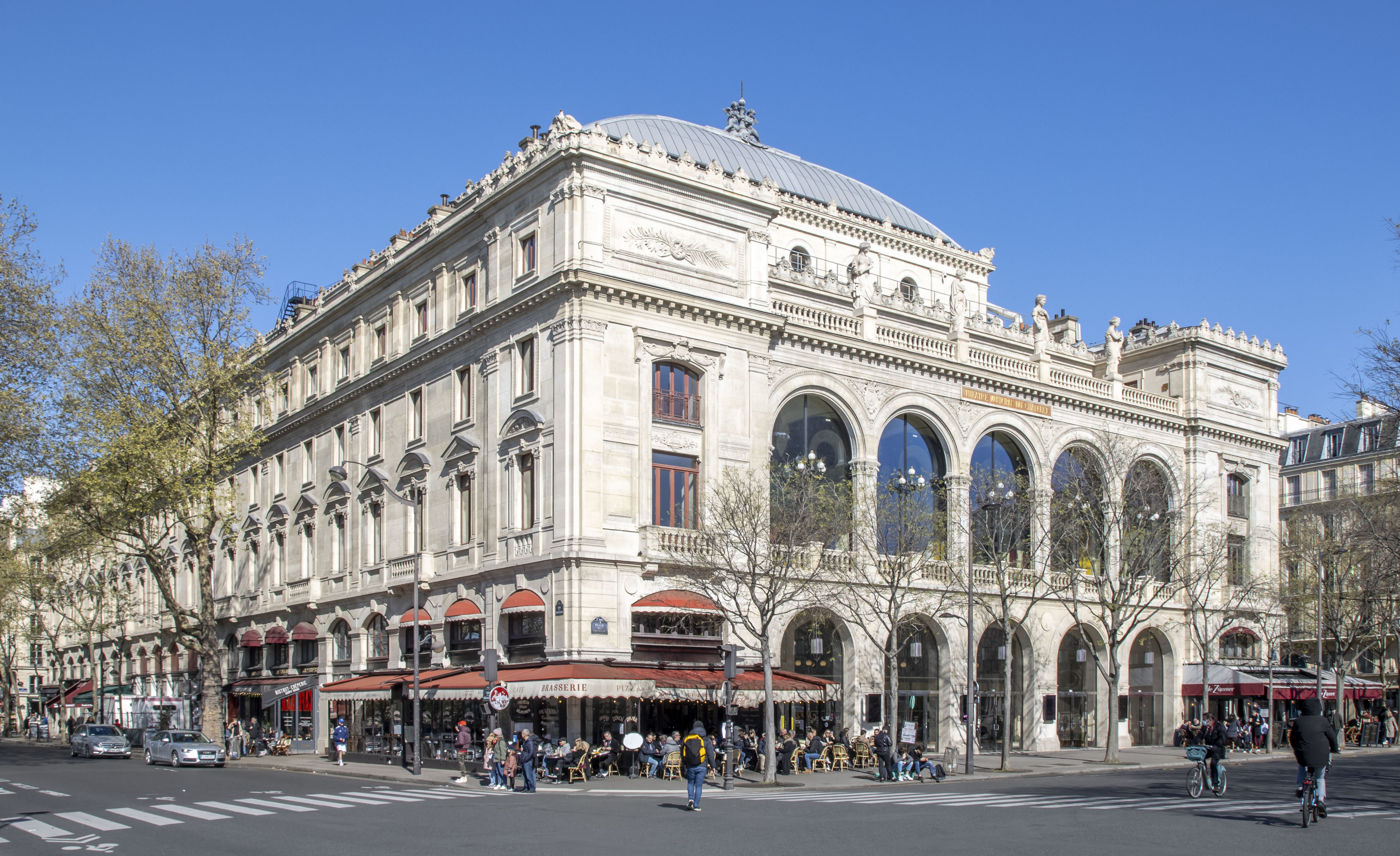
- Interactive map of Théâtre du Châtelet
- Address: 2 rue Edouard Colonne; 75001 Paris; France
- Coordinates: 48°51′28″N 2°20′47″E
- Owner: City of Paris
- Capacity: 2,500
- Public transit: Châtelet; Châtelet–Les Halles; 21, 38, 47, 58, 67, 69, 70, 72, 74, 75, 76, 85, 96

Construction
- Opened: 1862
- Architect: Gabriel Davioud

Website
- chatelet-theatre.com

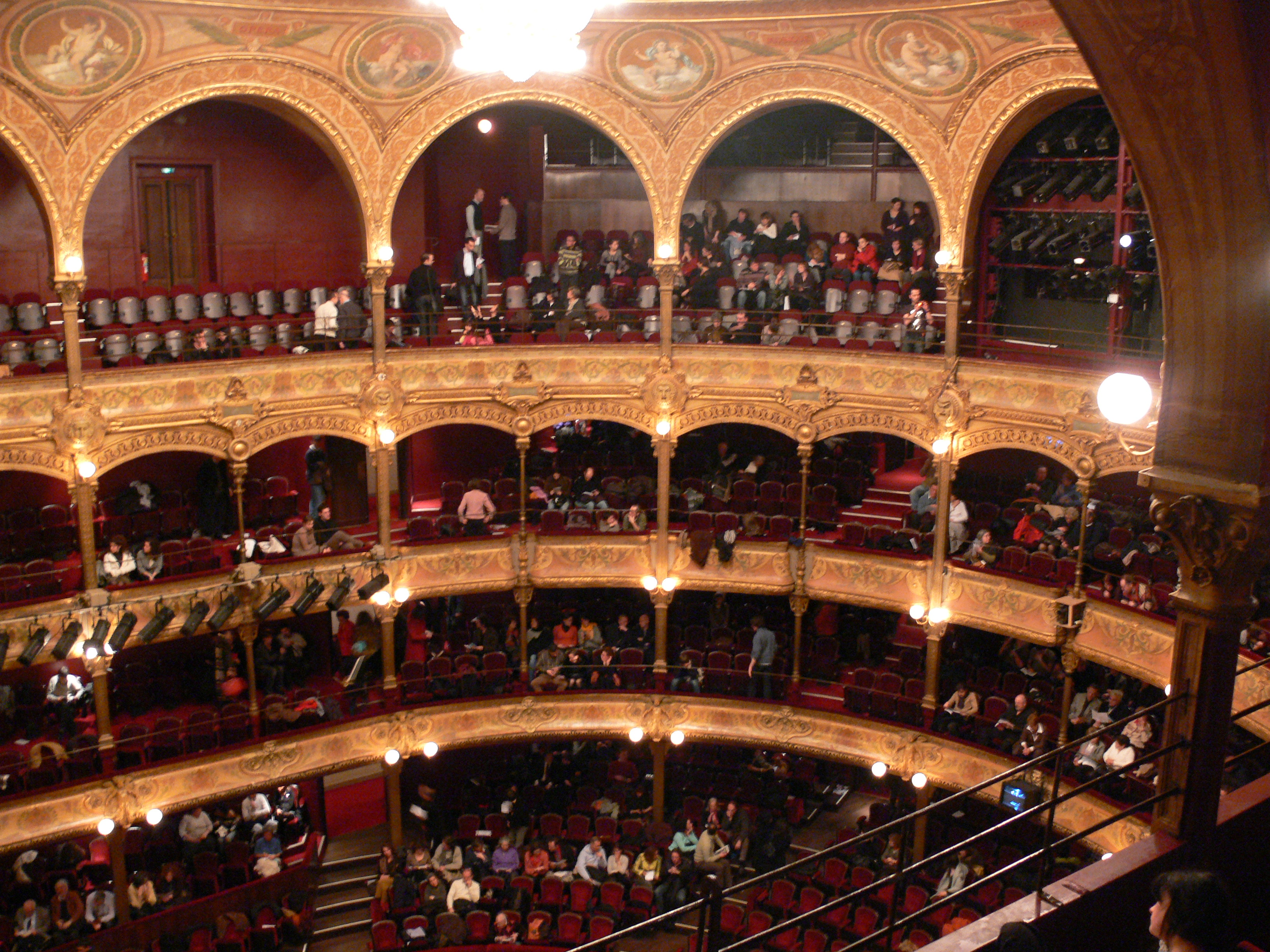
Auditorium of the Théâtre du Châtelet, 2008

The Théâtre du Châtelet (French pronunciation: [teɑtʁ dy ʃɑtlɛ]) is a theatre and opera house, located on the Place du Châtelet in the 1st arrondissement of Paris, France.

One of two theatres (the other being the Théâtre de la Ville) built on the site of a châtelet, a small castle or fortress, it was designed by Gabriel Davioud at the request of Baron Haussmann between 1860 and 1862. Originally named the Théâtre Impérial du Châtelet, it has undergone remodeling and name changes over the years. Currently it seats 2,500 people.

== Description ==
The theatre is one of two apparent twins constructed along the quays of the Seine, facing each other across the open Place du Châtelet. The other is the Théâtre de la Ville. Their external architecture is essentially Palladian entrances under arcades, although their interior layouts differ considerably. At the centre of the plaza is an ornate, sphinx-endowed fountain, erected in 1808, which commemorates Napoleon's victory in Egypt.

== Origins ==
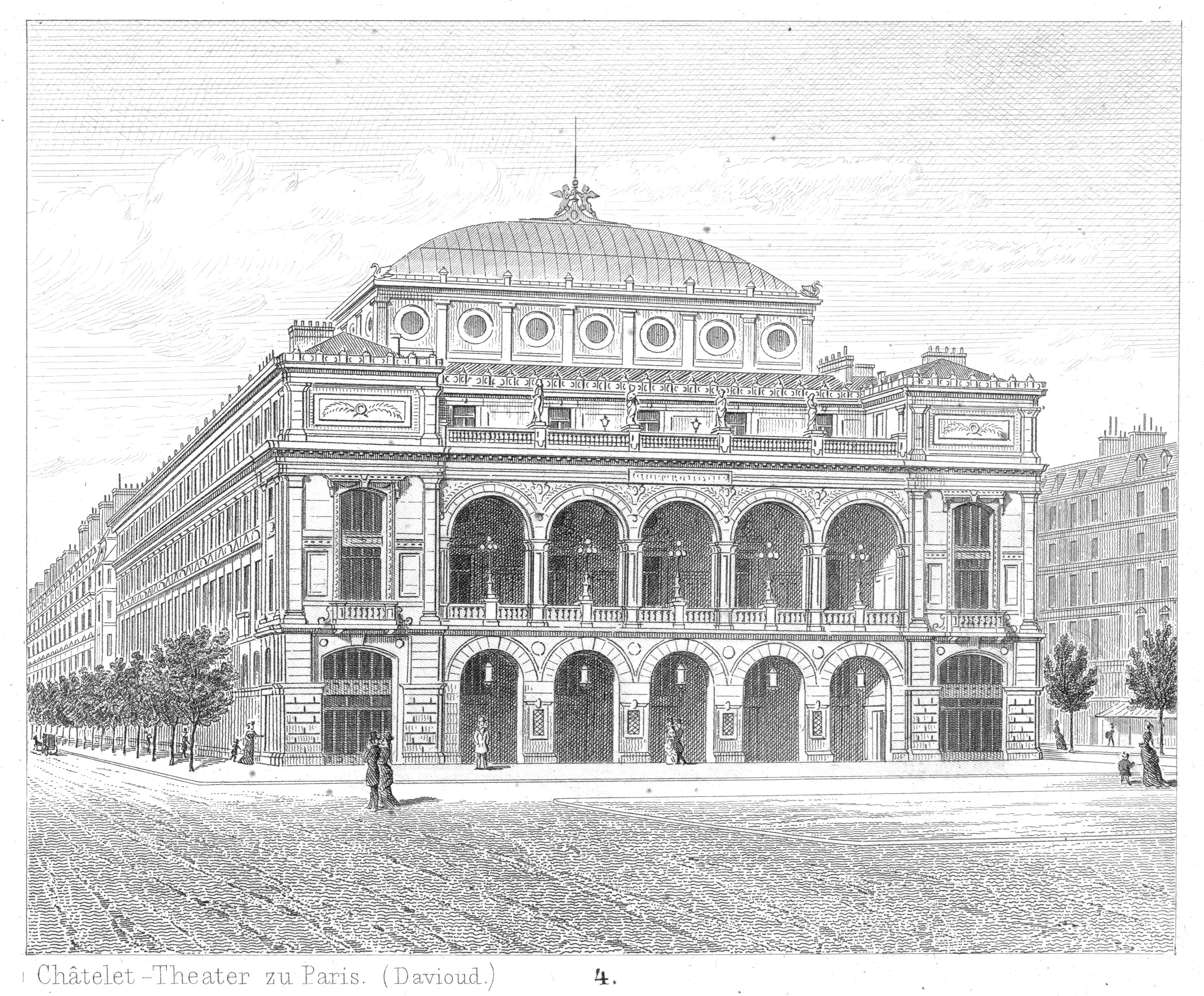
The theatre c. 1875

The Théâtre Impérial du Châtelet was built for Hippolyte Hostein's equestrian company, the Théâtre Impérial du Cirque. The previous theatre, the Cirque Olympique on the Boulevard du Temple, was slated for demolition by Baron Haussmann to allow the construction of the Boulevard du Prince-Eugène (now the Boulevard Voltaire).

The site for the new theatre was acquired by the City of Paris in October 1859, and construction took place between 1860 and 1862. The interior designers included Eugène Carrières and Armand Cambon, and the curtain was created by Charles Cambon.

The theatre originally seated 2,200 people, although Haussmann claimed it held 3,600. The repertory, fixed by a decree of 20 September 1862, included military works and féeries in one or several acts, as well as dramas and vaudevilles.

Hostein left as director in September 1868. Nestor Roqueplan ran the theatre from 1 July 1869 to April 1870.

== Fall of the Second Empire ==
The theatre was closed from September 1870 to July 1871 due to the Franco-Prussian War. The war brought about the fall of the Second French Empire, and under the succeeding French Third Republic, the appellation impérial was dropped. Hippolyte Hostein returned as the theatre's director in 1873–1874.

Notably, beginning in April 1876, the stage version of Jules Verne's Around the World in Eighty Days, adapted by Verne and Adolphe d'Ennery, began a run spanning sixty-four years and 2,195 performances (although not continuously). It was only the Nazi occupation of Paris in May 1940 that closed this production permanently.

== Twentieth century ==
Into the 20th century, the theatre was used for operettas, variety and ballet performances, for classical and popular music concerts. It was also, for a time, a cinema. Claude Debussy's Le Martyre de saint Sébastien received its premiere in the theatre on 22 May 1911. It was the first venue for the Ballets Russes, before they moved to the new théâtre des Champs-Élysées with their 1913 season: among the ballets premiered at the Châtelet are Igor Stravinsky's Petrushka on 13 June 1911, Paul Dukas' La Péri on 22 April 1912, Vaslav Nijinsky's Afternoon of a Faun on 29 May 1912, Maurice Ravel's Daphnis et Chloé on 8 June 1912, and Erik Satie and Jean Cocteau's Parade on 18 May 1917. In addition, many foreign composers and conductors made appearances in the theatre, including Pyotr Ilyich Tchaikovsky, Gustav Mahler and Richard Strauss.

Since 1979, the theatre has been operated by the City of Paris, and, after undergoing a major restoration, re-opened in 1980 under the name Théâtre Musical de Paris. It was acoustically re-modeled again in 1989 and reverted to the Théâtre du Châtelet name. Shirley Horn recorded her 1992 live album I Love You, Paris at the Théâtre du Châtelet. For a time it was mainly used for opera performances and concerts. The Orchestre de Paris and the Orchestre Philharmonique de Radio France have played there. In 1993 the Philharmonia Orchestra of London began an annual residency period.

Under the artistic direction of Stéphane Lissner from 1995 to 1999, the theatre received additional improvements in acoustics and sight lines.

== Twenty-first century ==
In 2004, Jean-Luc Choplin became artistic director of the theatre. He de-emphasized classical music and dance performances and introduced more lucrative productions of Broadway musicals, including Kiss Me, Kate, Singin' in the Rain, 42nd Street, and An American in Paris.

In 2017, Choplin was succeeded by Ruth Mackenzie, who was appointed artistic director alongside general director Thomas Lauriot dit Prévost, who had worked at the theatre with Choplin from 2006 to 2013. Mackenzie aimed to connect the theatre's programming more to the citizens of Paris, including its banlieues. Under her tenure, from 2017 to 2019, the theatre was closed for a $34.7 million renovation. While the main purpose of the renovation was to renew electrical circuits, fire safety and security, the Grand Salle was returned to its appearance of 1862 and the Grand Foyer to its Napoleon III style. Outside of the theatre, allegorical statues symbolising dance, music, comedy and drama which were removed at the end of the 19th century were restored.

When the theatre re-opened in 2019, Mackenzie and Lauriot dit Prévost introduced a "Robin Hood scheme" for theatregoers and sponsors to buy extra tickets for those who could not afford them.

In 2019, Comme des Garçons launched a fragrance called "Odeur Du Théâtre Du Châtelet Acte I" created by Caroline Dumur inspired by the history of the theatre mixed with the modernity of its new creative director Ruth Mackenzie.

Since the 2019 edition, the ceremony of the Ballon d'Or is held every year at the venue.

On 28 August 2020 it was announced that Théâtre du Châtelet had fired Ruth Mackenzie as artistic director, with an unnamed source suggesting a managerial problem with the staff and a financial problem due to an insufficient artistic season. In response, Mackenzie confirmed an inquiry into her performance had been carried out, but stated that it had not uncovered evidence of wrongdoing. General director Thomas Lauriot dit Prévost remained in his post.

Between September 2020 and January 2022, multiple productions were cancelled due to the coronavirus pandemic.

On 24 February 2022, 32 dancers of the Kyiv City Ballet were stranded in Paris due to the Russian invasion of Ukraine. The City of Paris offered them a residency at the Théâtre du Châtelet. Anne Hidalgo, mayor of Paris, announced this at one of the group's first performances at the theatre, saying the arrangement would last "for as long as it takes."

== Bibliography ==
- Allison, John, ed.(2003). Great Opera Houses of the World, supplement to Opera Magazine, London.
- Wild, Nicole (1989). Dictionnaire des théâtres parisiens au XIXe siècle: les théâtres et la musique. Paris: Aux Amateurs de livres. ISBN 978-0-8288-2586-3. ISBN 978-2-905053-80-0 (paperback).
