= Dankovsky =

Dankovsky (masculine), Dankovskaya (feminine), or Dankovskoye (neuter) may refer to:

- Dankovsky District, a district of Lipetsk Oblast, Russia
- Dankovskaya, a rural locality (a village) in Arkhangelsk Oblast, Russia
- Raisa Sergiyevna Dankovskaya, Ukrainian and Russian ethnographer, museologist, folklorist and archivist
