= Artem Datsyshyn =

Ukrainian ballet dancer (1979–2022)

- Artem Datsyshyn, in c. 2019
- Born: Artem Viktorovych Datsyshyn; 26 January 1979; Kherson, Ukrainian SSR, USSR
- Died: 17 March 2022 (aged 43); Kyiv, Ukraine
- Education: Kyiv Choreographic School
- Occupation: Ballet dancer
- Organizations: National Opera of Ukraine
- Awards: Rudolf Nureyev International Ballet Competition

Artem Viktorovych Datsyshyn (Ukrainian: Артем Вікторович Дацишин, 26 January 1979 – 17 March 2022) was a Ukrainian ballet dancer and soloist with the National Opera of Ukraine, where he performed leading roles in ballets including Tchaikovsky's Swan Lake and Prokofiev's Romeo and Juliet. He achieved prizes in international competitions, and toured in Europe, North America, and Japan. He was killed by Russian artillery fire during the 2022 Russian invasion of Ukraine.

== Life and career ==
Datsyshyn was born in Kherson and graduated from the Kyiv Choreographic School associated with the Kyiv Ballet. He studied with V. Parsegov. While still a student, he competed in the 1996 International Serge Lifar Ballet Competition achieving a third prize. He shared second prize at the 1998 Rudolf Nureyev International Ballet Competition, where no first prize was awarded.

In 1997, Datsyshyn became a soloist with the National Opera of Ukraine. He appeared in the leading roles of Marius Petipa and Lev Ivanov's Swan Lake and The Nutcracker, Jean Coralli and Jules Perrot's Giselle, Petipa's La Bayadère, and Prokofiev's Romeo and Juliet, among many others. He appeared as a partner of Anastasia Volochkova at Sadler's Wells Theatre in London in September 2001. He toured Spain and Mallorca in 2004 with the Kyiv company, performing Swan Lake and The Sleeping Beauty. In October 2014, he participated in a charity event of the National Opera of Ukraine for children of refugees, presenting the ballet Cipollino, with music by Karen Khachaturian and in a 1995 choreography by Genrikh Mayorov, of a story of a hero who bravely enters the fight against injustice and leads his friends and associates to the victory of good over evil. In the performance with many new dancers, he had the role of "funnily arrogant" Prince Lemon. He danced on tours to Germany, Austria, Switzerland, Italy, Spain, France, Portugal, Japan, Lebanon, Canada, and the United States. His interpretations were described as expressive and with "romantic sublimity" and "psychological depth".

== Death and legacy ==
According to Russian-American choreographer Alexei Ratmansky, Datsyshyn was wounded on 26 February 2022 from Russian shelling. BBC News reported Datsyshyn's death on 19 March 2022, having died from his injuries two days earlier. He was 43 years old.

Anatoly Solovyanenko, who serves as chief stage director in the National Opera of Ukraine, made a post on Facebook, calling Datsyshyn "a great artist" and a "wonderful man". Ratmansky called him a "beautiful dancer loved by his colleagues", and that his loss was "unbearable pain".
