= Kyiv City Ballet =

Ukrainian ballet touring company

General information
- Name: Kyiv City Ballet
- Year founded: 2012
- Founding artistic director: Ivan Kozlov
- Website: www.kcbtheater.com

Kyiv City Ballet is an independent touring ballet troupe from Ukraine, currently operating from Paris, France.

== Background ==
Kyiv City Ballet was founded in 2012 by Ivan Kozlov who currently serves as the company's general director. The associate director is Ekaterina Kozlova. The rehearsal director is Mykhaylo Shaherbakov. While in refuge during the Russian invasion of Ukraine, the group is operating from Paris, France.

== Repertoire ==
In December 2023, according to the group's website, the ensemble was working on a project called Boys from Kyiv. Their repertoire in December 2023 was listed as:

- Swan Lake
- The Nutcracker
- Romeo and Juliet
- Scheherazade
- Giselle
- The Sleeping Beauty
- Chopiniana
- Don Quixote
- Comical concert
- Thoughts
- Tribute to Peace

The group's website also listed ballets for children including Cinderella, Snow White and the Seven Dwarves, Aibolit and Barmelei, and Coppelia.

== Tour history ==
In 2022, the group was stranded abroad while on tour in France performing the Nutcracker during the February 2022 Russian invasion of Ukraine.

== National Opera of Ukraine statement ==
In January, 2023, the National Opera of Ukraine, based in Kyiv, issued a statement that touring ballet groups with similar names to its own were not official affiliates. The statement directly referenced "Kyiv City Ballet" as a group that does not represent the NOU.

The statement emphasised the National Opera's disagreement over performances of Russian composer Tchaikovsky's works, The Nutcracker and Swan Lake, during Russia's invasion of Ukraine. This opinion is not universally shared in the Ukrainian music community, with others emphasizing Tchaikovsky's connection to Ukraine including Tchaikovsky's Ukrainian heritage, Ukrainian influences on Tchaikovsky's music, and Tchaikovsky's time spent in Ukraine.

== See also ==
- Grand Kyiv Ballet
- National Ballet of Ukraine
- National Opera of Ukraine
- Ukrainian Dance
