= Raissa =

Raissa, also Raïssa, is a female given name. It is a variant of the given name Raisa. Notable people with the name include:

== Mononym ==
- Raissa (singer, born 1971), full name Raissa Khan-Panni, English singer-songwriter
- Raissa (Malaysian-British singer), known for her debut single "Bullying Boys"

== Given name ==
- Raissa Santana (b. 1995), Miss Brasil 2016
- Raissa Kelly (b. 1976) French singer in Tachelhit
- Raissa Calza (1894–1979), Ukrainian dancer who became a classical archaeologist
- Raïssa Maritain (1883–1960), Russian poet and philosopher who immigrated to France
- Raissa Feudjio (b. 1995), Cameroonian footballer
- Raïssa Gbédji (1972 or 1973–2025), Beninese journalist and singer
- Raïssa Koublitskaïa (1928–2021), Soviet Belarusian agricultural worker and politician
- Raissa Venables (b. 1977), American photographer
- Raissa Ruus (1942–1986), Estonian middle-distance runner at the 1972 Summer Olympics
- Raissa L. Berg (1913–2006), Russian geneticist and evolutionary biologist
- Raissa Nitabuch (1859–unknown), Russian pathologist
- Raïssa Malu, Congolese physicist, educator and politician
- Raissa Martin (b. 1991), Australian goalball player
- Raissa D'Souza, Professor of Computer Science and Mechanical Engineering at the University of California
- Raissa Gourevitch (b. 1984), Russian tennis player
- Raïssa Dapina (b. 1995), Senegalese handball player

== See also ==
- 1137 Raïssa, an asteroid
