= National Ballet of Ukraine =

Ukrainian ballet company

General information
- Name: National Ballet of Ukraine
- Year founded: 1867
- Principal venue: National Opera of Ukraine
- Website: http://www.opera.com.ua/

Senior staff
- Chief executive: Petro Chupryna

Artistic staff
- Artistic director: Nobuhiro Terada

Other
- Formation: Principal; First Soloist; Soloist; Corps de Ballet

National Ballet of Ukraine from the Taras Shevchenko National Opera of Ukraine performs works of classical ballet and tours internationally. It currently has 24 ballets in its repertory, one of the largest in the world, and has had many notable dancers among its members.

== History ==
=== 1867 to 1930 ===
The National Opera of Ukraine, a performing arts theatre with a resident opera company, was established in 1867. It also included a small resident troupe of ballet dancers, who would perform mainly folk-style dancing during opera productions. By 1893, this grew to a troupe large enough to stage large ballets. Folk dancing and ballets with Ukrainian stories were among the early productions.

During the 1910s, the dance scene in Kyiv saw a rapid development in classical ballet and contemporary dance training and performance. Mikhail Mordkin, a former soloist with the Bolshoi Ballet, travelled to Kyiv with a troupe and gave performances with Art Nouveau approaches, containing Spanish and Oriental themes. He was hired by the experimental Kyiv Young Theatre between 1916 and 1919, and gained a reputation as an influential teacher of movement and dance.

Bronislava Nijinska, sister of Vaslav Nijinsky and a former soloist with Diaghilev's Ballets Russes in Paris, fled to Kyiv in 1916 to escape World War I upheaval in Western Europe. Her husband, also a dancer with the Ballets Russes, was hired as ballet master at the Kyiv Opera. Nijinska founded a modernist dance school, the École de Mouvement, in Kyiv. This was an influential step forward in Kyiv's dance culture, exposing artists there to the avant garde of Western Europe. Following the Communist Revolution in Russia and Ukraine, however, Nijinska was forced to flee once more, to Poland, and the school disbanded shortly afterward. Her most prominent pupil while in Kyiv was local dancer Serge Lifar, who went on to become principal dancer with the Ballets Russes in 1923, and was considered the most important dancer and choreographer of his generation.

=== 1931 to 1989 ===
The first full symphonic Ukrainian ballet, Mr. Kanyovsky by M. Verikivsky, was premiered by the National Ballet of Ukraine on October 18, 1931. In 1935, the National Ballet of Ukraine was awarded the gold medal at the London International Folklore Dance Festival. The National Ballet of Ukraine company began to tour internationally by the 1950s, primarily in Communist Bloc countries such as Bulgaria, Yugoslavia, and Hungary, but also to Britain and France. The National Ballet of Ukraine was awarded the Étoile d'Or the French Dance Academy's highest prize, at the 1964 International Dance Festival in Paris. Performances by the National Ballet of Ukraine in Paris were considered highlights of the European cultural calendar for many years.

=== 1990 to today ===
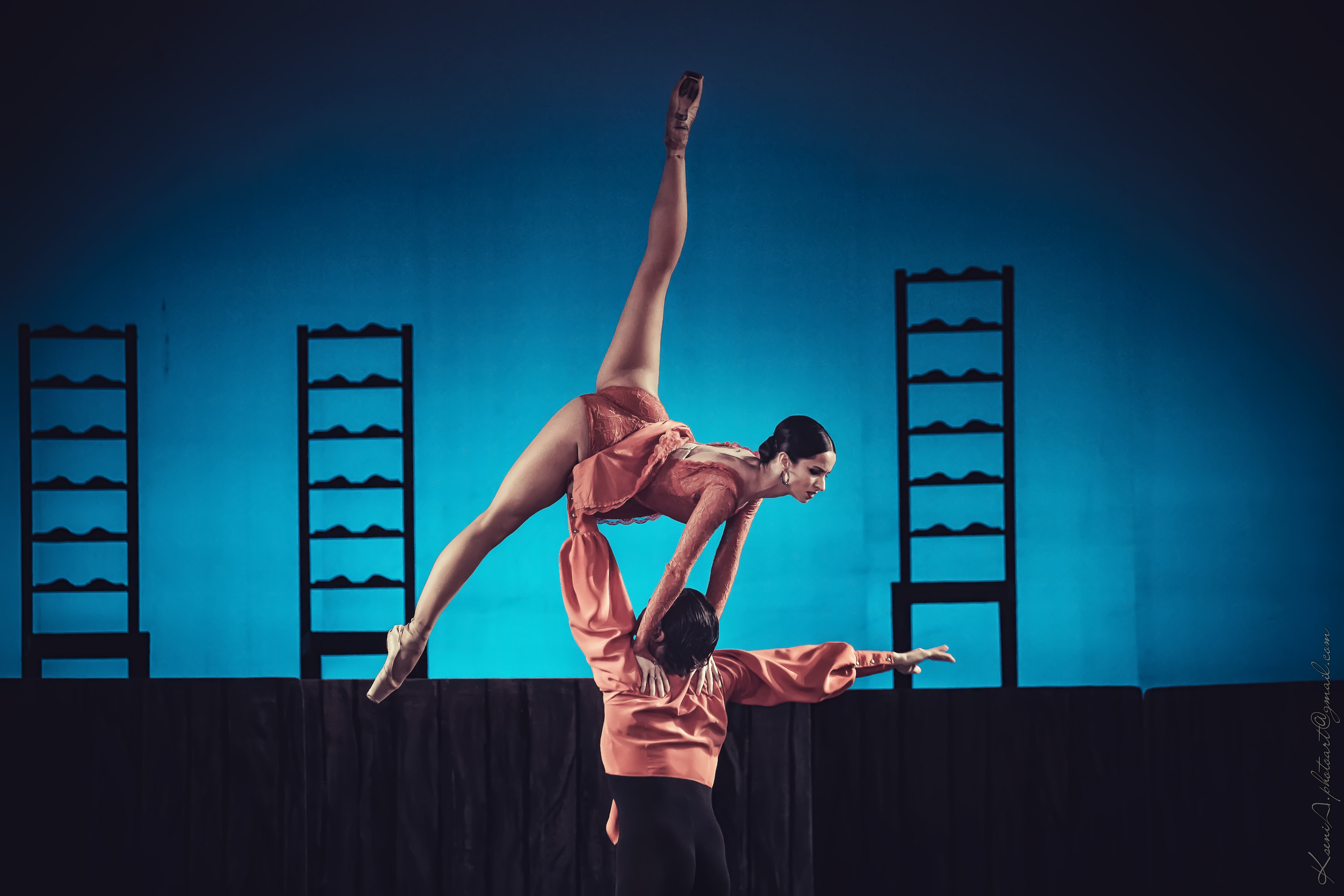
Carmen performed in 2014

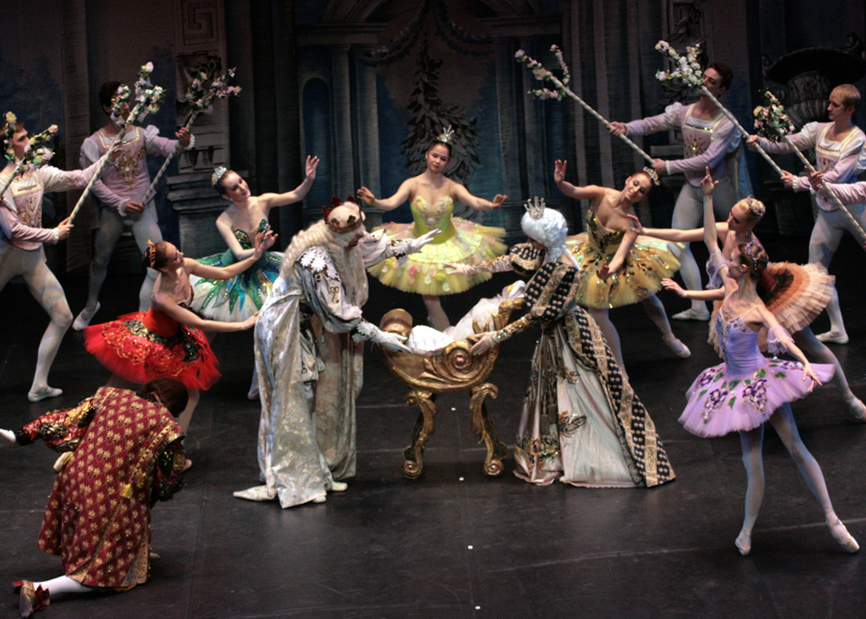
Sleeping Beauty performed in 2015

Following Ukraine independence in 1990, the National Ballet of Ukraine began more extensive international touring, adding performances in North America, Europe and Asia to its tours.

Choreographer Anatoly Shekera directed the company from 1992 to 2000. Shekera was a driving force of the National Ballet during the late 20th century. Shekera directed modern and classical ballet works. The company currently has around 150 dancers, and stages 16 productions per month in its Kyiv theatre, in addition to extensive international touring.

Some of the famous current members of the National Ballet are Natalia Matsak, Sergii Kryvoken, Olga Kifyak, Oleksandr Skulkin, Olga Golitsia, Mykyta Sukhorukov, Tetiana Lozova, Yaroslav Tkachuk, Anastasiia Shevchenko, Jan Vana, Kateryna Kukhar, Hkrystyna Shyshpor, Kateryna Alaieva, Olena Karandieieva.

Some of the famous former members of the National Ballet are Alina Cojocaru, the Bolshoi's Svetlana Zakharova, Leonid Sarafanov, Maxim Beloserkovsky and his wife, Irina Dvorovenko. Other former members are Maya Plisetskaya, Nadezhda Pavlova, Marina Timofeyeva, Irina Kolpakova, Alla Osipenko, Vladimir Malakhov and Elena Philipieva.

== Kyiv State Ballet School ==
The Kyiv State Choreographic College, formally Kyiv Choreographic School/Academy was founded by Galina Berezova. The school was founded in 1949 and is considered one of the best ballet schools in the post-Soviet space. It first opened in 1934 as a small studio to train ballet dancers for the Taras Shevchenko National Opera of Ukraine, where the legendary ballet teacher and influencer Agrippina Vaganova worked.

== Tours ==
=== 2022 Ukraine Ballet Benefit ===
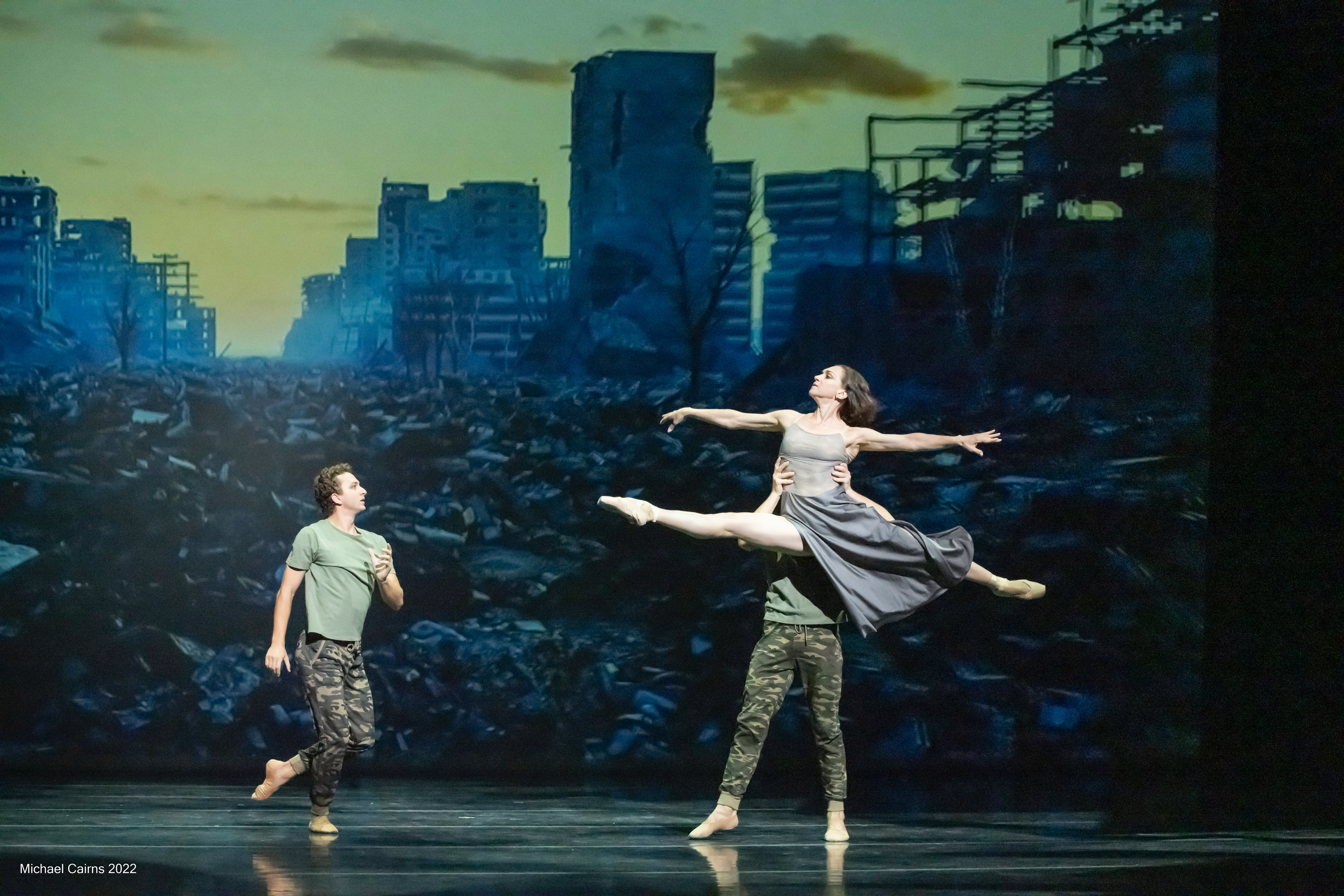
Ukraine Ballet Benefit

The Ukraine Ballet Benefit was performed by the world-renown National Ballet of Ukraine from the Taras Shevchenko National Opera House in the prestigious Steinmetz Hall in Orlando, Florida USA on August 27, 2022. This performance affirmed the power of art and beauty over tyranny and destruction. Organized by Marc McMurrin, Vadim Fedotov, and Ginsburg Family Foundation, the benefit performance was given the endorsement of the Ukrainian government and raised more than $800,000 providing humanitarian assistance and emergency medical aid to Ukrainian citizens, refugees, and veteran services.

This performance was professionally filmed and broadcast on PBS and Ukraine's state television where millions of Ukrainians saw their national artists perform and Americans standing with them. The film won an Emmy Award in 2023 and the performance can be viewed here.

=== 2024 North America tours ===
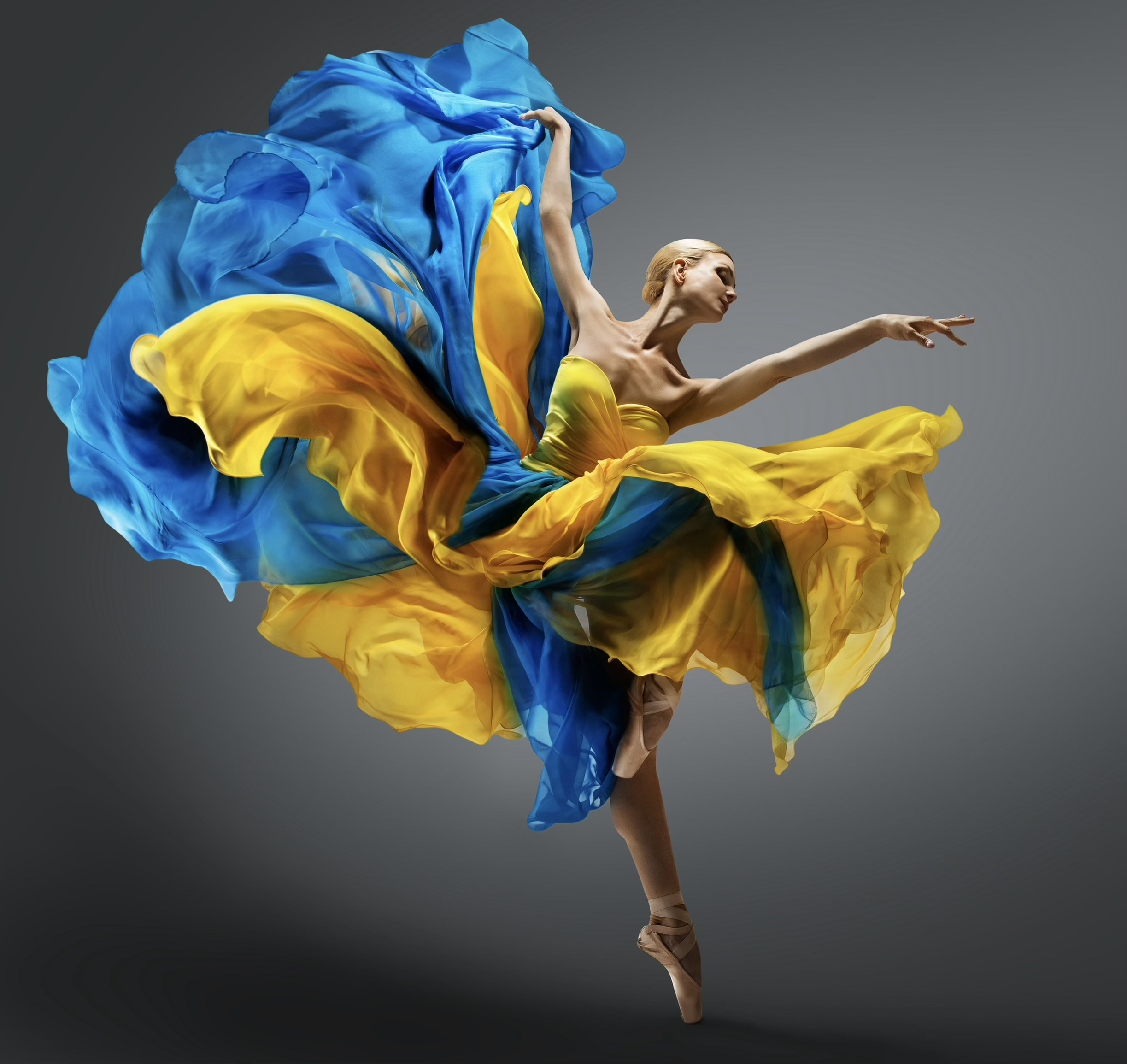
Nadyia Ukraine Tour

The National Ballet of Ukraine toured North America (Canada & US) Winter/Fall 2024. The tour highlighted some of the most famous ballets while highlighting Ukrainian culture. The show was titled "Nadiya Ukraine", as 'Nadiya' means 'Hope' in Ukrainian. The tour included 20 performances in 10 Canadian cities over 30 days, including Quebec, Montreal, Ottawa, Toronto, Winnipeg, Regina, Saskatoon, Vancouver, Edmonton, and Calgary. National Ballet of Ukraine described the performances as celebrating "art and beauty over tyranny and destruction" and expressed gratitude for Canadian support of Ukraine.

In October 2024, The National Ballet of Ukraine toured the east coast of the United States, which was their first tour of the US since before the Declaration of Independence of Ukraine (1991). The tour began at the Kennedy Center in Washington DC.

== 2022 boycott and statement ==
Following the 2022 Russian invasion of Ukraine, the National Opera and Ballet Theatre of Ukraine announced a boycott of works by Russian composer Tchaikovsky, including The Nutcracker and Swan Lake. It instead prioritised works by international composers, including, in 2025, La fille mal gardée.

In January 2023, the company issued an online statement that independent Ukrainian ballet troupes were touring Europe with names that could lead people to think these touring troupes represented the National Opera and Ballet Theatre of Ukraine.

== See also ==
- National Opera of Ukraine
