= Nadiya Shestak =

Ukrainian singer (born 1962)

Nadiya Petrivna Shestak (Ukrainian: Шестак Надія Петрівна, Russian: Надежда Петровна Шестак, romanized: Nadezhda Petrovna Shestak; born 21 April, 1962) is a Ukrainian pop singer with honorary titles Merited Artist of Ukraine (1993) and People's Artist of Ukraine (1998)

Nadiya Shestak was born in Kopeysk, Chelyabinsk Oblast, RSFSR (now Russia) to a Ukrainian family who were deported from Ukraine to Siberia. She graduated from the high school and music school. Afterwards the family returned to the homeland and in 1978 Nadiya graduated from Kyiv Institute of Culture. In 1991 she graduated from the Gnessin State Musical College (then called Gnessin Moscow Institue of Theatre and Stage).

== Awards and decorations ==
- 1993: Merited Artist of Ukraine
- 1998: People's Artist of Ukraine.

2000: Order of Princess Olga of third degree
