= Miss Raisa =

Spanish rapper (born 1997)

- Born: Imane Raissali; 1997 (age 28–29)
- Origin: Tangier, Morocco
- Genres: Hip hop
- Occupations: Rapper; songwriter; artist

Imane Raissali (born 1997), known professionally as Miss Raisa, is a Moroccan-born Spanish rapper.

== Early life and education ==
Born in Tangier, Raisa moved with her family to the Barcelona neighborhood of La Barceloneta at the age of 8. At the age of fourteen, while in high school, she came into contact with hip-hop culture.

== Adult life ==
Her musical style stands out for her controversial lyrics with high social content about racism, religion, gender, freedom of expression and integration.

Miss Raisa has been questioned about wearing the veil and when she took it off in the summer of 2022, because she no longer felt identified with what she represented, she was criticized from the Muslim and feminist community. Feminism for Raisa is the defence of the rights and freedoms of all women: Muslim, racialized, etc. She has come to receive death threats on social networks especially following a video she published in which she supported the LGBT community.

She won the Premis Continuarà de cultura award in 2022.

== Bibliography ==
- Porque me da la gana, una vida contra los prejuicios. (2022)
