= Raisa Khylko =

Ukrainian and Soviet ballet dancer, prima ballerina, later ballet master

- Раїса Хилько
- As Nikiya in La Bayadère.
- Born: 21 September 1950 (age 76); Dnipro, Ukrainian SSR, Soviet Union
- Education: Kyiv State Choreographic College, GITIS
- Occupations: Ballet dancer; Teacher
- Organizations: National Opera of Ukraine, Kyiv Municipal Academic Opera and Ballet Theatre for Children and Youth
- Awards: People's Artist of Ukraine

Raisa Oleksiyivna Khylko (Note: Ukrainian: Раїса Олексіївна Хилько, romanized: Raisa Oleksiivna Khylko; Russian: Раиса Алексеевна Хилько, romanized: Raisa Alekseyevna Khilko) (born September 21, 1950) is a Ukrainian and Soviet ballet dancer, prima ballerina, later ballet master of the National Opera of Ukraine. People's Artist of Ukraine (1978).

== Life and career ==
Khylko was born on September 21, 1950 in the city of Dnipro, Ukraine. Her father, Oleksiy (1903 – 1973), worked as the senior blast-furnace keeper at the Dniprovsky Metallurgical Plant. Her mother, Lidia (1913 – 1993), worked at the same plant in a blast-furnace shop.

Khylko began to dance as a child in the local Pioneers Palace, where her teachers saw her talent for dance and advised her parents that they gave their daughter a professional ballet education.

In 1968, Khylko graduated from the Kyiv State Choreographic College, where her pedagogue was Natalia Verekundova, a pupil of Agrippina Vaganova. In 1984, she also graduated from GITIS with the diploma of a ballet master. From 1968 to 1994, Raisa was active as a soloist and prima ballerina of the National Opera of Ukraine.

While still a final-year student at the college, she made her stage debut as a soloist by dancing one of three Big Swans in the ballet Swan Lake.

In 1969, she performed her first ballerina's role in the “Chopiniana” ballet.

From 1995 to 2000—a soloist and ballet master at KMATOB (Kyiv Municipal Academic Opera and Ballet Theatre for Children and Youth).

From 2000 to 2002, Khylko taught the history of ballet and the methodology of teaching ballet at the Kyiv National I. K. Karpenko-Kary Theatre, Cinema and Television University.

Since 2002, she has worked as a ballet master and ballet pedagogue at the National Opera of Ukraine. Among her pupils are Elizaveta Cheprasova, Anna Muromtseva, Julia Moskalenko, Alisa Voronova, Anastasia Shevchenko, Veronika Gordina, and Natalia Lazebnikova.

On September 28, 2025, the National Opera of Ukraine hosted an evening of one-act ballets on the occasion of Raisa Khylko's jubilee. The program of the evening included two one-act ballets: "Chopiniana" (suite of piano pieces by Frédéric Chopin, script and choreography by Michel Fokine), in which she began her career as a ballet soloist, and "Tango" (Five Tangos—a one-act ballet to the music by Astor Piazzolla, choreography by Hans van Manen). Before the start of the performance, the celebrant was congratulated by the artistic director of the ballet company, People's Artist of Ukraine Nobuhiro Terada.

== Awards ==
- 1973 — Merited Artist of Ukraine
- 1978 — Varna International Ballet Competition — golden medal
- 1978 — People's Artist of Ukraine

== Repertoire ==
- Swan (music by C. Saint-Saëns)
- La Bayadère — Nikiya
- Don Quixote — Kitri
- Swan Lake — Odette-Odile
- Raymonda — Raymonda
- Spartak (choreographed by A. Shekera) — Aegina
- The Nutcracker — Clara (Masha)
- Carmen Suite — Carmen
- The Sleeping Beauty — Aurore
- Giselle — Giselle
- La Sylphide — Sylphide
- Lisova Pisnya (music by M. Skorulskyi) — Mavka
- Olga (music by Е.Stankovych) — Olga
- The Fountain of Bakhchisarai — Maria
- The Legend of Love — Mekhmené Banou, Chirine
- Death and the Maiden — Maiden
- Daphnis et Chloé — Chloé
- Cipollino — Magnolia

For 26 years of her career as a ballet dancer, R. Khylko’s partners were V. Nekrasov, S. Lukin, V. Kovtun, V. Fedotov, M. Pryadchenko, V. Fedorchenko, V. Vidineyev, A. Ratmansky, and others.

She participated in the performances staged by such renowned choreographers as А. Shekera, O. Vinogradov, V. Litvinov, G. Kovtun, H. Mayorov, R. Klyavin, М.-E. Murdmaa.

== Tours ==
As a guest performer and member of the ballet company of the National Opera of Ukraine, Raisa Khylko toured Japan, Italy, Spain, France, Germany, Portugal, Hungary, Bulgaria, Egypt, Argentina, Brazil, Peru, and Nicaragua.
