= Natalia Matsak =

Ukrainian ballet dancer (born 1982)

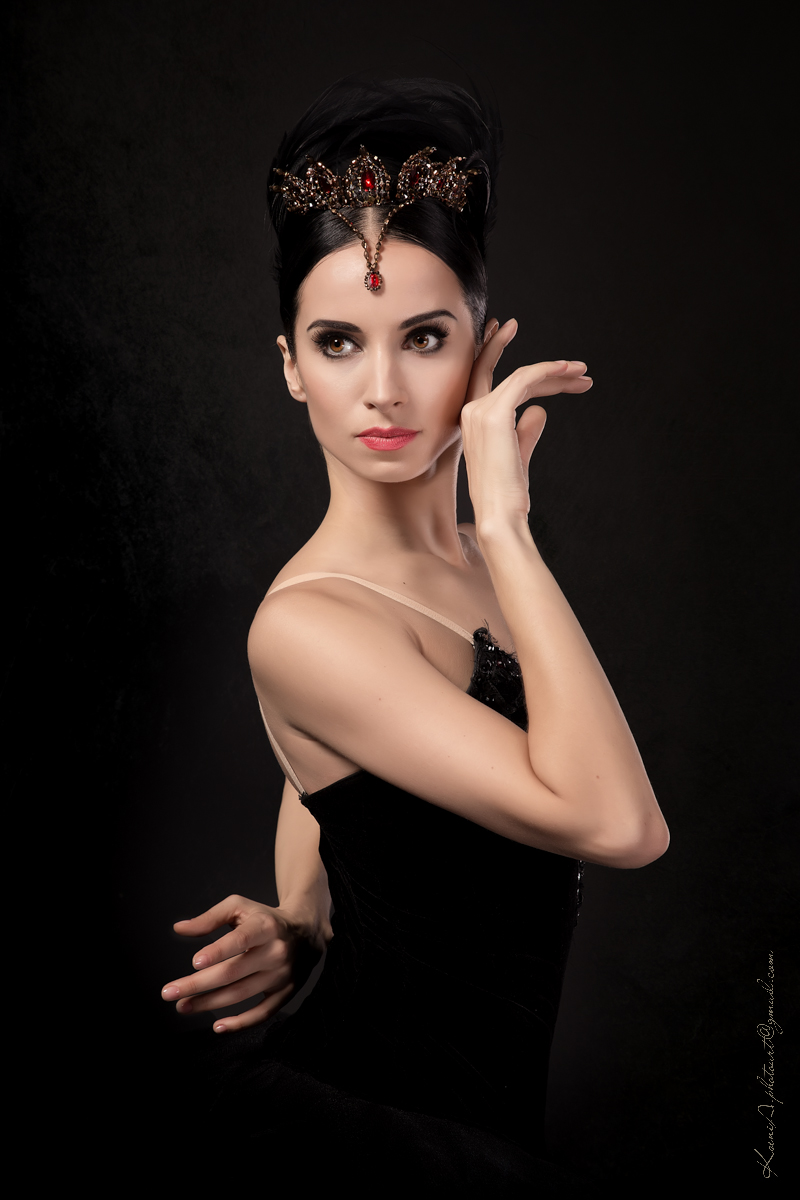
- Natalia Matsak 2016
- Born: 17 March 1982 (age 44); Kyiv, Ukrainian SSR, Soviet Union
- Occupation: Ballerina
- Career
- Dances: Ballet, modern
- Website: www.matsak.com.ua

Natalia Matsak (Ukrainian: Наталія Мацак, born 17 March 1982) is a Ukrainian ballet dancer, prima ballerina (since 2005) in the National Opera House of Ukraine, and an Honored Artist of Ukraine (since 2008).

== Biography ==
=== Early life and education ===
Matsak started taking dance classes when she was 4 years old. After dancing with the children's dance company Dudarik she went on to study ballet. From 1992 to 2000 Matsak studied at the Kyiv State Ballet School. Her first significant performance on the stage of the National Opera House of Ukraine took place during her senior year. Along with her groupmate Andrey Gura she made a performance of pas de deux from Don Quixote (to the music of Ludwig Minkus).

=== Getting started in the National Opera House of Ukraine ===
After graduating from the Kyiv State Ballet School, Matsak joined the ballet company of the National Opera House of Ukraine. At the same time the leadership of the ballet company was taken over by the principal dancer, People's Artist of Ukraine Victor Yaremenko, who was interested in working with young artists, who were open to new ideas and plot concepts. The 18-year-old ballerina's professional debut was a pas de trois in the Kingdom of the Shades in La Bayadère (to the music of Minkus) and the premiere of Viennese Waltz on the stage of the National Opera House of Ukraine in 2001 (to the music of Johann Strauss, musical composition of A. Baklan, ballet master Aniko Rekhviashvili).

=== Principal dancer of the National Opera House of Ukraine ===
In 2001 Matsak a received the new official title — principal dancer of the National Opera House of Ukraine. This gave her access to the parts in the ballet of academic heritage such as Le Corsaire (A. Adam), Don Quixote (L. Minkus), Swan Lake, Sleeping Beauty (P. Tchaikovsky), Raymonda (A. Glazunov) and others.

In 2004 Matsak took part in the Fifth Serge Lifar International Ballet Competition in Kyiv, receiving the Diploma of Laureate (2nd place). Within the competition she performed pas de deux from the classical repertoire (Swan Lake, Le Corsaire), and a modern dance called Dream Dance with Maksim Motkov (to the music of Kitaro-Chernenko, ballet master Aniko Rekhviashvili). In 2005 she won 3rd place in the Tenth Moscow International Ballet Competition and Contest of Choreographers. Among many of her performances, there was a variation of Odette from Swan Lake, a variation of Kitri from the 1st act of Don Quixote, a variation of Gamzatti from La Bayadere, a modern dance Say it Quieter, If You Can (ballet master Yevgeniy Chernov) and others. Matask's performance was recognised by Olga Lepeshinskaya, Yury Grigorovich, Mikhail Lavrovskiy, Natalia Bessmertnova, Natalia Makarova and others. This recognition led to the title in her home theater of prima ballerina of the National Opera House of Ukraine. In 2006 Matsak won first place (Gold medal in the senior group) in the Sixth Serge Lifar International Ballet Competition in Kyiv. Of special interest to the audience and the award panel was the performance called "The Way", (to the music of J. Massenet, ballet master Dmitriy Klyavin). She won the highest prize. In the same year she received an invitation to play one of the main parts in the ballet Daniela (to the music of Mykhaylo Chemberzhi, ballet master Aniko Rekhviashvili).

=== National Academic Bolshoi Opera and Ballet Theatre of Belarus ===
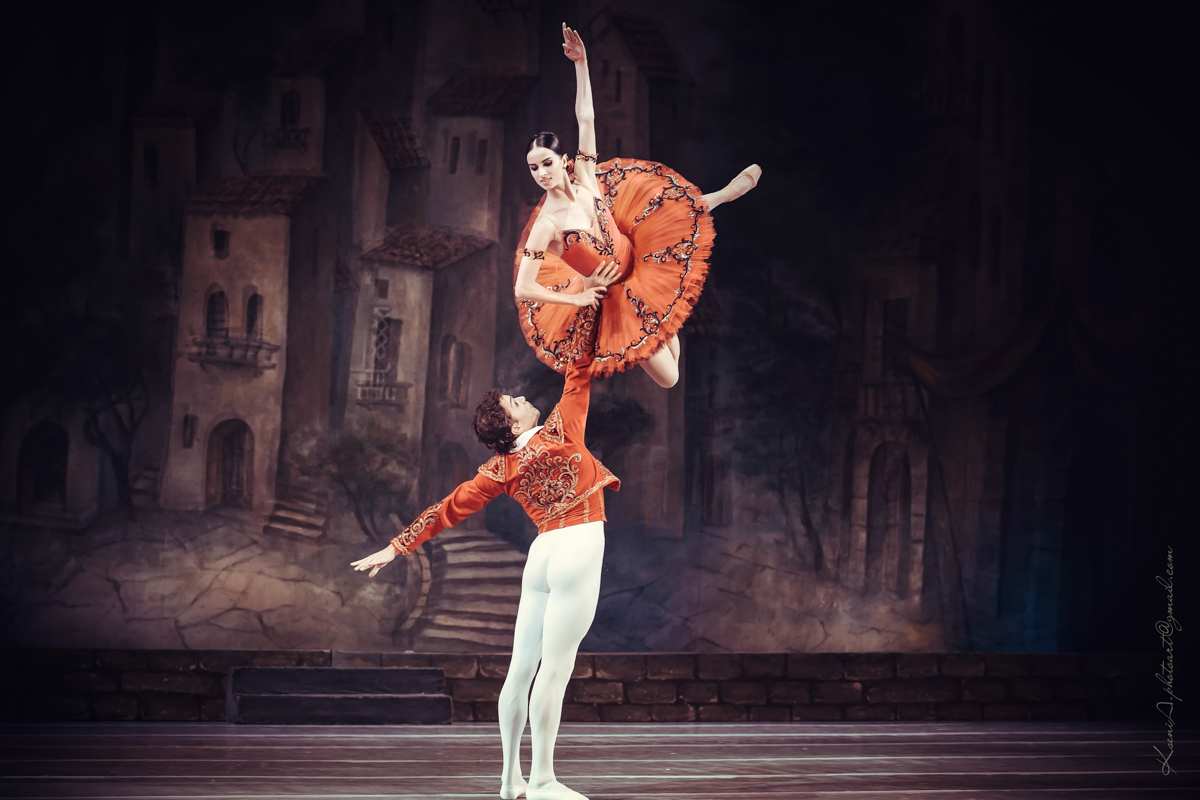
As Kitri in "Don Quixote"

From 2006 to 2008 Matsak was performing on the stage of the National Academic Bolshoi Opera and Ballet Theatre of Belarus in Minsk, where she had been invited by the artistic director of the theater Valentin Elizariev. Her performances included Swan Lake (2006), Gala concert dedicated to Elizariev's 60th anniversary (2007), and Don Quixote (2008).

=== National Theater of Japan ===
In January 2009 "An Evening with Igor Kolb" the principal dancer of the Mariinsky Theater took place in Tokyo. For this event Matsak performed Grand Pas Classique (to the music of Daniel Auber, choreography by V. Gzovskiy) in duet with Mikhail Kaniskin, the soloist of the ballet company of the Berlin State Opera.

=== Mikhailovsky Theater in Saint Petersburg ===
In April 2009 the Ukrainian ballerina performed on the stage of Mikhailovsky Theater in St. Petersburg, where she played the part of Medora in the version of Le Corsaire (A. Adam) revised by Farukh Ruzimatov. At the same time she took part in the concert dedicated to the achievements of Yelena Scheglova, the Honored Artist of Russia and People's Artist of Tatarstan (Kazan, M. Dzhalil Tatar Academic State Opera and Ballet Theater).

=== Cooperation with Boris Eifman ===
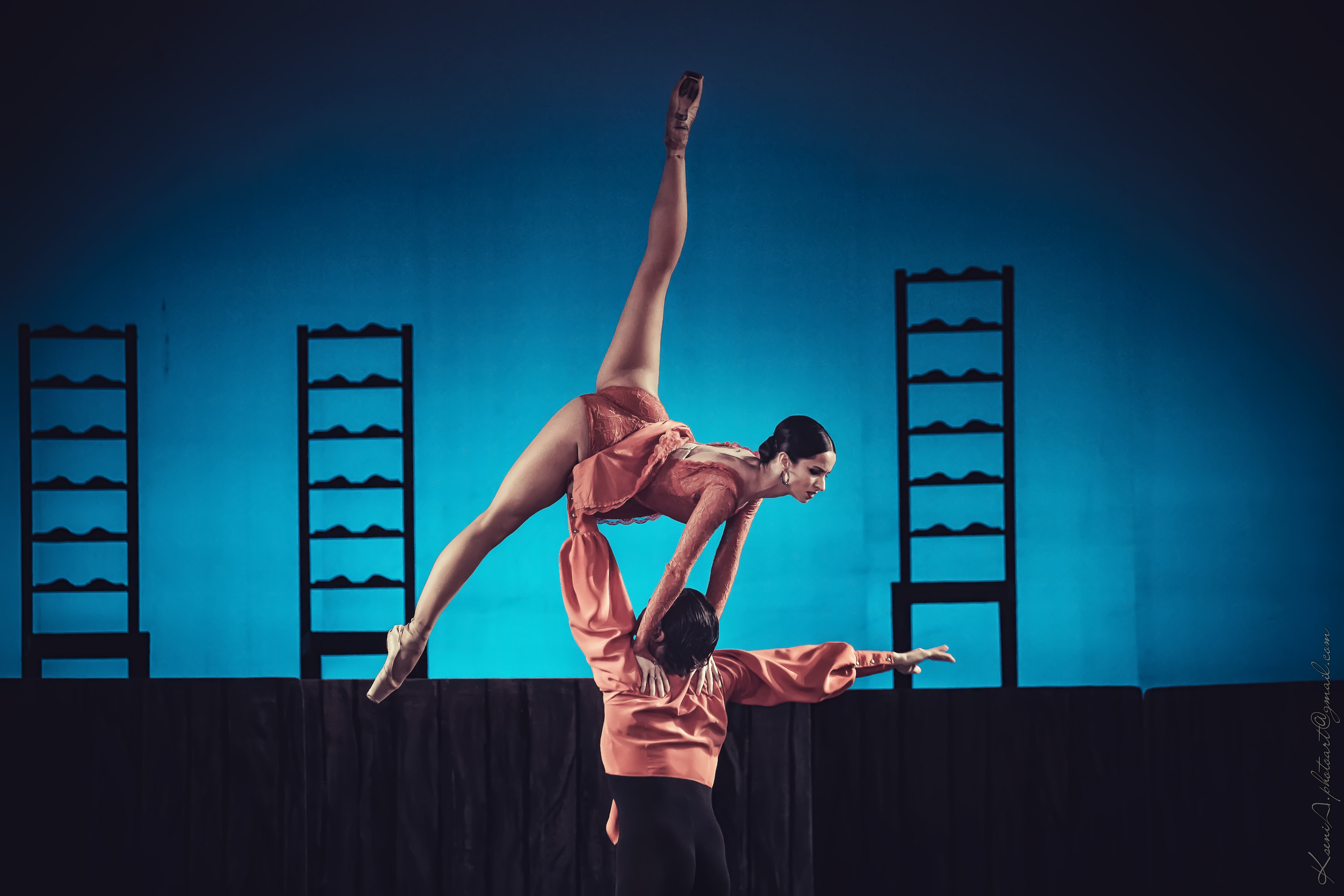
As Carmen in "Carmen Suite"

In August 2010 the first-night of Boris Eifman's I am Don Quixote (to the music of L. Minkus) took place on the stage of Alexandrinsky Theater in St. Petersburg. This was followed by 18 months of touring with the Eifman ballet across Europe and the US.

=== Dortmund Opera House ===
In 2011 in Dortmund Matsak worked with Raimondo Rebeck, a German ballet master (modern dance) and a graduate of the Berlin Ballet School. As a part of the ballet concert along with the ballet company of the Dortmund Opera House, she prepared a duet dance called Yesterday. Today. Tomorrow (to the music of Max Richter On the nature of the daylight) with Howard Lopez.

=== Tours ===
During 2007-2011 Matsak was a regular guest at the International Festival of Classical Ballet named after Rudolf Nureyev in Kazan (ХХ-XXIV). The parts performed by her at the festival were Odette-Odile from Swan Lake, Medora from Le Corsaire, the Queen of the Dryads from Don Quixote, Gamzatti and Nikiya from La Bayadère, the Lilac Fairy from Sleeping Beauty. At the same time the ballerina constantly toured with the ballet companies of the National Opera House of Ukraine and other international theaters, performing on stages in Italy, Spain, Portugal, United States, Canada, Mexico, Japan, and Korea.

=== Honored Artist of Ukraine ===
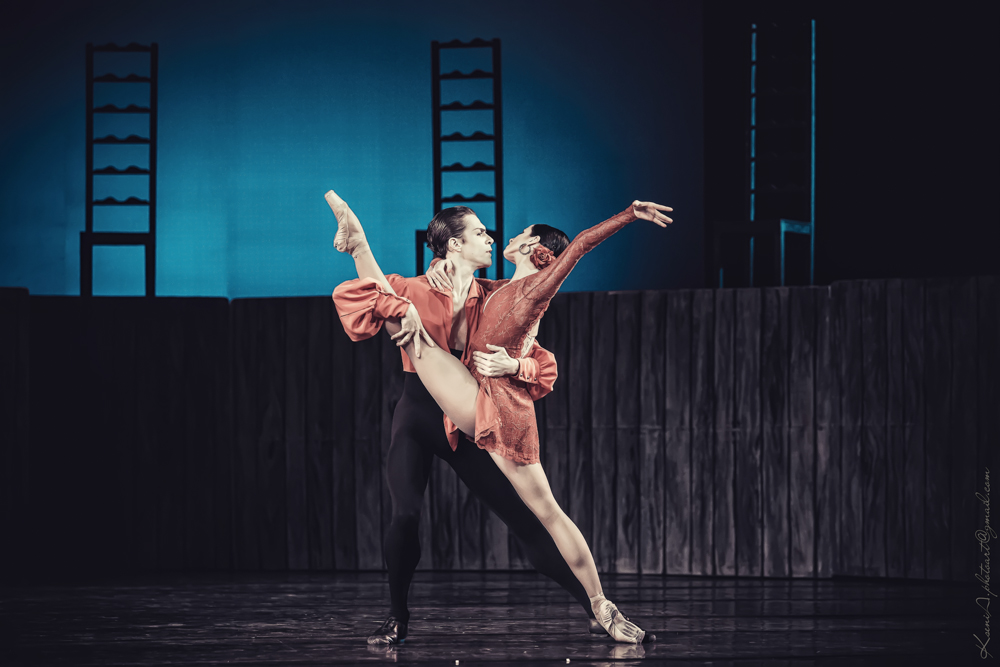
As Carmen in "Carmen Suite"

Matsak's work was closely intertwined with performances on the stage of the National Opera House of Ukraine. Since 2008 Matsak she has been awarded with the title Honored Artist of Ukraine according to a Decree of the President of Ukraine Victor Yushenko. In April 2010 there was An Evening with Natalia Matsak which was dedicated to the first 10 years of her ballet career. The performances chosen to be staged were Carmen Suite (to the music Rodion Shchedrin after Bizet) ballet master A. Alonso) and Scheherazade (to the music of N. Rimsky-Korsakov, choreography by M. Fokine, revised by V. Yaremenko). In winter 2014 Matsak took part in the project "Irina Kolesnikova invites...", held in the Palais des congrès de Paris, where she performed as Nikiya in "La Bayadere" and Odile-Odette in "Swan Lake" with Vadim Muntagirov, principal dancer with the Royal Ballet in London. In summer 2015 an "Irina Kolesnikova season" took place in the London Coliseum, where she performed as Odile-Odette in "Swan Lake" with Kimin Kim, principal dancer with the Mariinsky Theater, and as Gamzatti in "La Bayadere" with Denis Rodkin, principal dancer of the Bolshoi Ballet Company. In December 2015 within the tour Ave Maya! in memory of Maya Plisetskaya she performed on the stages of Dnipropetrovsk, Kyiv, Odesa and Chisinau (Moldova). 2016 started with performances in "Swan Lake" and "Nutcracker" in Amsterdam (the Netherlands) and Belgrade (Serbia), and also in "Don Quixote" in Riga (Latvia).

=== Cooperation with Denys Nedak ===
Matsak has performed in duet with Honored Artist of Ukraine, leading soloist of the National Opera House of Ukraine, Denys Nedak. One of their first performance took place in April 2008 within the Ninth Serge Lifar de la Danse International Festival, where they presented adagio from the ballet Suite in White (to the music of E. Lalo, ballet master S. Lifar). In 2012 both artists received the exclusive right to perform a choreographic passage from Boris Eifman's "Red Giselle" ballet, describing the tragic fate of a famous Russian ballerina Olga Spessivtseva (to the music of Tchaikovsky, Schnittke, and Bizet). The duet of Matsak and Denys took part in the Fifteenth (June 2009) and Eighteenth (June 2012) International Festivals of Classical Ballet named after Rudolf Nureyev in Ufa. Along with other leading soloists from all over the world, Nedak and Matsak participated in a tour called World Ballet Stars which included over 20 Russian cities (Ruslan Nurtdinov's project, November 2012).

== Repertoire ==
- Sleeping Beauty — Princess Aurora
- Swan Lake — Odette, Odile
- La Bayadère — Nikiya (the version of M.Petipa and N. Makarova)
- Nutcracker — Masha
- La Sylphide — Sylphide
- Giselle — Giselle
- Raymonda — Raymonda
- Don Quixote — Kitri(the version of M.Petipa and B. Eifman)
- Le Corsaire — Medora
- Spartacus — Aegina
- Scheherazade — Scheherazade
- Carmen Suite — Carmen
- Viennese Waltz — Karla

== Other works ==
- Legend Of Love — Mehmene Banu
- Laurencia — Laurencia (the version of V.Chabukiani, edited by M. Messerer)
- Red Giselle (duet) B. Eifman
- Grand Pas Classique (Ober)
- Yesterday. Today. Tomorrow "Heute ist das Gestern von morgen" - Choreographie: Raimondo Rebeck

== Awards ==
- 2004 — The Diploma of Laureate in the Fifth Serge Lifar International Ballet Competition in Kyiv, receiving (2nd place)
- 2005 — 3rd place in the Tenth Moscow International Ballet Competition and Contest of Choreographers
- 2006 — 1st place (Gold medal in the senior group) in the Sixth Serge Lifar International Ballet Competition in Kyiv
- 2008 — Honored Artist of Ukraine
