= Raisa (surname) =

Raisa is a surname. Notable people with the surname include:

- Francia Raisa (born 1988), American actress
- Rosa Raisa (1893–1963), Polish-born Russian operatic soprano
- Unto Raisa (born 1934), Finnish chess master
