= Elena Philipieva =

Ukrainian prima ballerina

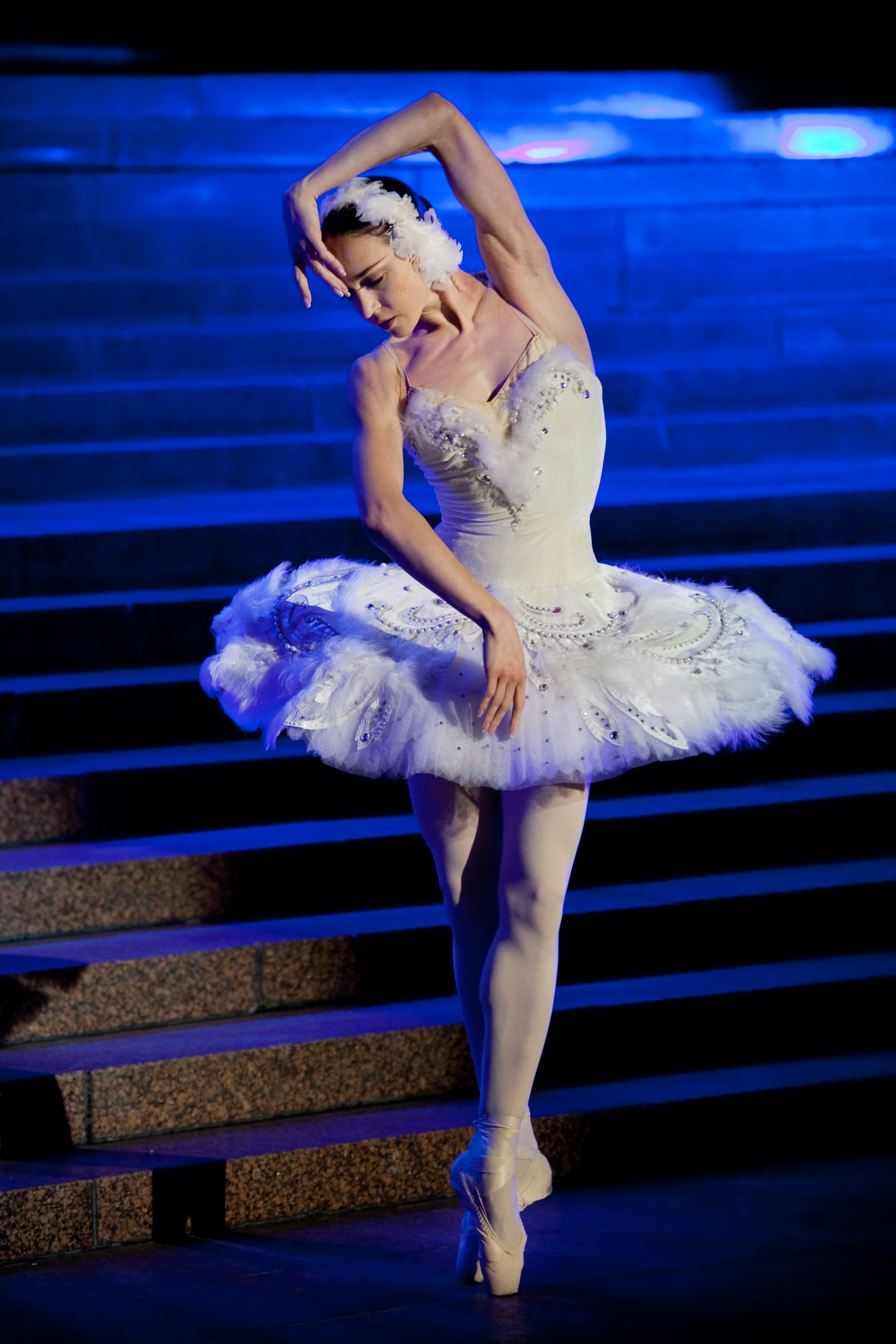
- Festival "Descents to Heaven" 2010. Performance by Elena Filipieva.
- Born: May 23, 1970
- Years active: 1988 - present

Elena Philipieva (also spelt Olena Filipieva) (Ukrainian: Олена Філіп'єва, born 23 May 1970) is a Ukrainian prima ballerina and ballet director of the National Opera of Ukraine.

== Biography ==
Philipieva was born in the city of Dniprorudne in Ukraine. Her parents were athletes. As a child, she trained in gymnastics and then folk dancing. In 1988 she graduated from the Kyiv State Choreographic School. While studying, she performed in Giselle at the National Opera of Ukraine.

In 1988 Philipieva was appointed a ballet soloist of the National Opera of Ukraine and later started tutoring younger dancers. In 2020 she was promoted to the position of ballet director of the National Opera of Ukraine.

Maya Plisetskaya claimed her to be the best dancer she had ever seen and presented her with a ring as a sign of her admiration. At the age of 23, Philipieva was awarded a People's Artist of Ukraine title.

Philipieva has performed in Japan, Canada, US, Mexico, Brazil, Germany, France, Italy, Spain, Switzerland, Norway and many other countries. Among her partners were Nikolai Tsiskaridze, Farukh Ruzimatov, Alexander Vetrov, Alexei Fadeyechev, Patrick Dupond, Denis Matvienko.

=== Repertoire ===
- Juliet in Romeo and Juliet
- The Sylph in La Sylphide
- Giselle in Giselle
- Kitri in Don Quixote
- Odette, Odile in Swan Lake
- Clara in The Nutcracker
- Medora in Le Corsaire
- Aneli in Viennese Waltz
- Princess Aurora in The Sleeping Beauty
- Cinderella in Cinderella
- Zoreslava in The Lord of Borisfen
- Mavka, Kylyna in Forest Song
- Susanna in The Marriage of Figaro
- Zobeide in Scheherazade
- Carmen in Carmen Suite
- Oksana in The Night Before Christmas
- Marina in Zorba the Greek

== Awards ==
- 1989: 3rd prize at International Ballet Competitions in Moscow
- 1994: Gold Medal at St. Petersburg Maya Competition
- 1996, 1999: Silver Medal at International Ballet and Modern Dance Competition, Japan
- 2019: Order of Princess Olga
