= Raisa Sergiyevna Dankovskaya =

Ukrainian and Russian ethnographer, museologist, folklorist and archivist (1885–1956)

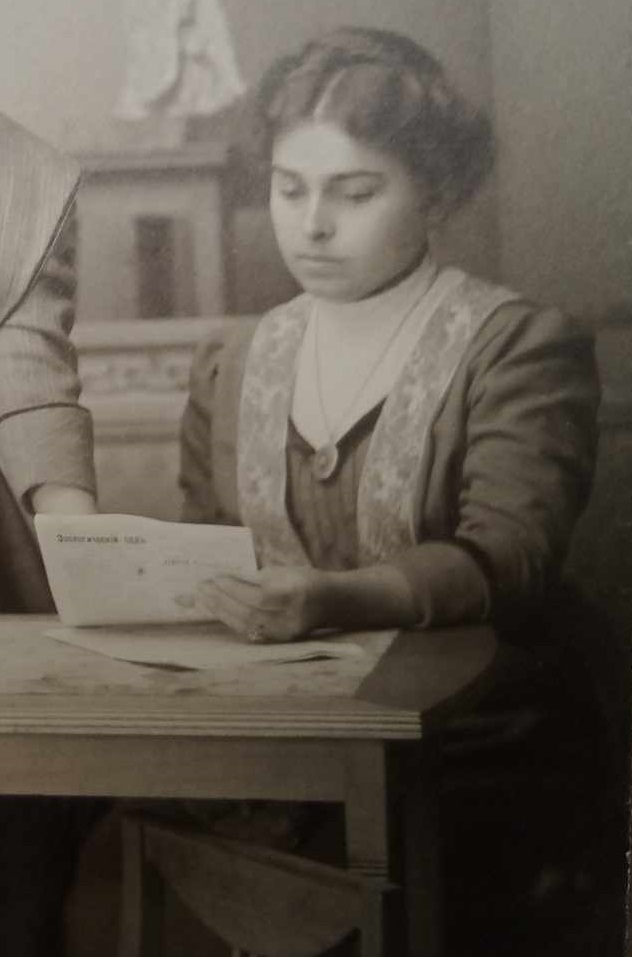
- (1910)
- Born: Raisa Dankovska; 1885; Novy Oskol, Russia
- Died: 23 February 1956 (aged 70–71); Kharkiv, Ukraine
- Education: Higher Women's Courses in Moscow
- Occupations: Ethnographer, museologist, folklorist and archivist
- Known for: Ceremonial breads, pastries and rituals in Ukraine

Raisa Sergiyevna Dankovskaya (in Russian, Dankovska) (1885 – 23 February 1956) was a Ukrainian and Russian ethnographer, museologist, folklorist and archivist. She is remembered for her academic study of ceremonial breads, pastries and rituals in Ukraine.

== Biography ==
Raisa Dankovskaya was born in 1885 in the city of Novy Oskol in the Belgorod region of Russia. In 1909, she published her first scientific article, “Little Russian Ritual Cookies of the Kursk Province” in which she researched "the use of ritual bread at various stages of the wedding ritual: matchmaking (to exchange bread), giving 'small cones' when the bride invites her friends ('to go after her friends') and the groom - the boyars, the meeting of the groom with the bride in her house - exchanging 'large cones', treating with 'small cones,' distribution of the loaf, meeting of the bride in the groom's house, consumption of 'lezhnya' and 'large cone' at the final wedding feast."

When her paper was reviewed by the Ukrainian ethnographer Volodymyr Hnatiuk, he said, “it contains all the cookies (breads and doughs) used in various rituals, to which ethnographers have so far paid little attention, although they fully deserve it.” The period between 1909 and the 1930s included years of "active research and museum-organizational activity of the scientist [Dankovskaya]."

She graduated from the Higher Women's Courses in Moscow, Faculty of History and Philosophy in 1911. In 1912, she began teaching at the First Moscow school and, at the same time, she headed the branch of the Society of Lovers of Natural History, Anthropology, Geography and Ethnography at Moscow University. From 1920, she was the keeper of the ethnographic department and, beginning in 1923, she was head of the Museum of Slobod in Kharkiv, Ukraine. In the 1920s, Dankovskaya was a researcher in the ethnographic section of the Kharkiv Research Department of the History of Ukrainian Culture, and a member of the Ethnographic Society in Kyiv.

However, in 1929, after a country-wide effort to remove influential people from their jobs, and a government audit of the museum's activities, investigators concluded that "the staffing of workers does not meet modern requirements," resulting in the firings of Dankovskaya and two employees. According to Herus, her scientific research work was suspended and any additional work remains lost. "Only fragmentary information has been found about R. Dankovska's subsequent life and activities" until 1938.

From 1938 to 1939, Dankovskaya worked as a senior archival and technical employee of the Moscow Department of the Archive of the USSR Academy of Sciences. In 1947, Dankovskaya returned to Kharkiv to live and in 1953, she began working as an archivist at the Kharkiv Trust “Donbassenergomontazh.” She died on 23 February 1956 in Kharkiv.

== Selected works ==
- Dankovskaya R. S. Malorossiysk ceremonial cookies of the Kursk province // Ethnographic obozrenie. — 1909. — No. 1.
- Dankovskaya R. S. Wedding rites among the Little Russians of Graivoronsky district in the 1870s // Ethnographic review. — 1909. — No. 2-3.
- Dankovska R. On memorable things in Slobozhanshchyna, connected with the name of Skovoroda // Bulletin of the Museum of Sloboda Ukraine named after G. S. Skovoroda. — 1927—1929. — No. 2-3.
- Dankovska R. Ukrainian folk lamps. Part I. Luchyna. Kagantsi // Scientific collection of the Kharkiv Research Department of the History of Ukrainian Culture. — 1927. — Vol. VII.
- Dankovska R. Sleds in the evening ritual // Materials for Ukrainian-Russian Ethnology. 1929. Vol. XXI-XXII.
