= Kateryna Kukhar =

Ukrainian ballet dancer

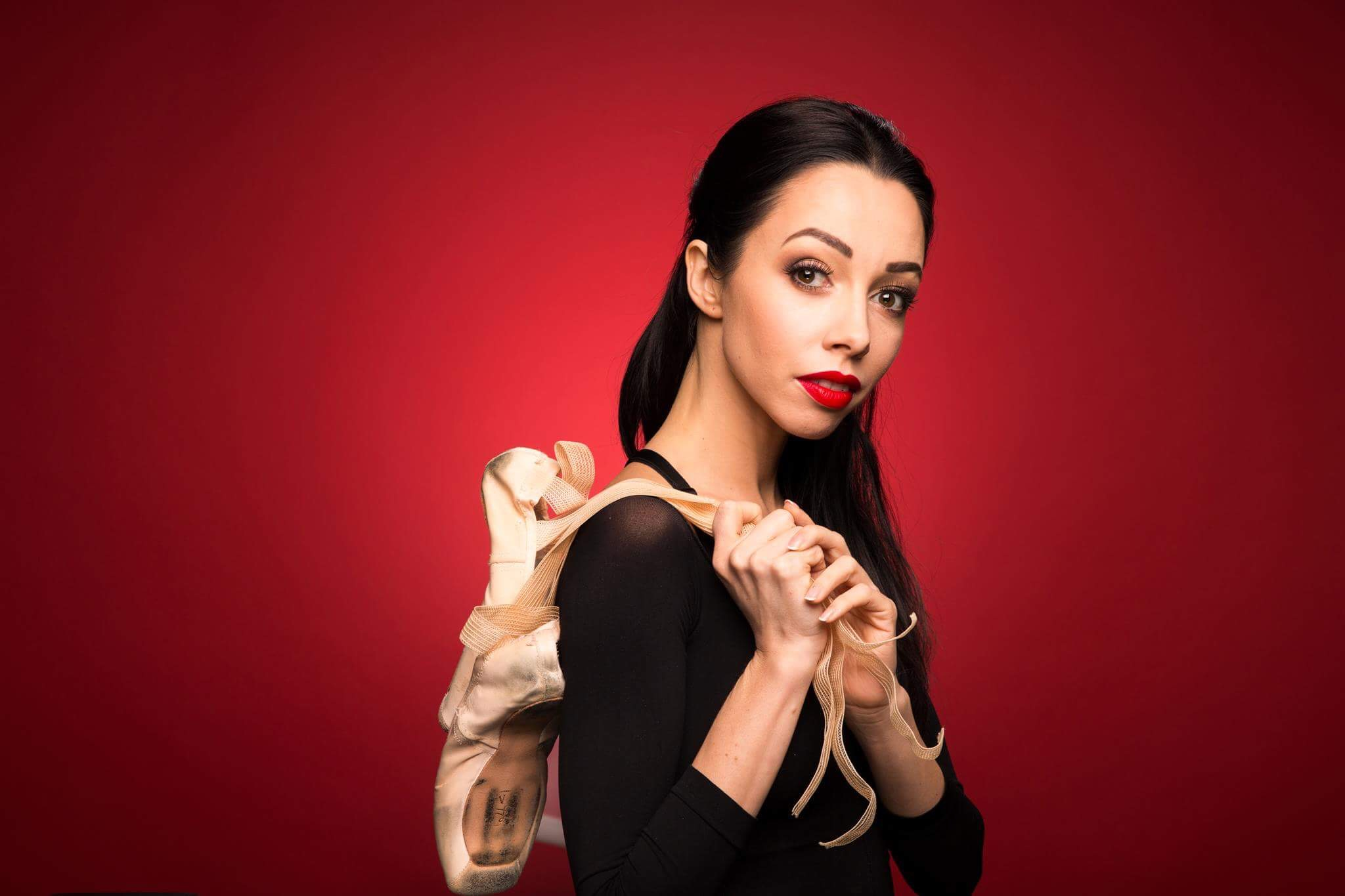
- Born: 18 January 1982 (age 44); Kiev, Ukrainian SSR, (now Kyiv, Ukraine)
- Education: Kyiv State Choreographic School (Kyiv Choreographic College)
- Occupation: Ballet dancer
- Title: Merited Artist of Ukraine; People's Artist of Ukraine; Order of Princess Olga, 3rd class
- Spouse: Oleksandr Stoyanov

Kateryna Ihorivna Kukhar (Ukrainian: Катерина Ігорівна Кухар, born 18 January 1982) is a Ukrainian prima ballerina of the National Opera of Ukraine. She has been awarded the titles Merited Artist of Ukraine since 2012 and People's Artist of Ukraine since 2018.

== Biography ==
Kukhar started ballet lessons at the age of five. Without a qualifying round, she was invited to be part of a gymnastics group at the local youth centre – the Palace of Pioneers.

In 1992, Kukhar entered Kyiv State Ballet School, formerly known as Kyiv Choreographic College. After just two years of studies, she was awarded a diploma of the Second Ukrainian Festival of Arts «Всі ми діти твої, Україно».

In 1997, Kukhar won a prize at the international dance competition Prix de Lausanne, and was invited to a internship in Lausanne, Switzerland.

At the age of 16, Kukhar made her first appearance as Masha in the "Nutcracker" ballet at the Bunka Kaikan Concert Hall, Japan.

In 1999, she graduated with high honors and distinction from Kyiv State Ballet School under the tutelage of the principal, Tatyana Alekseevna Tayakina, the People's Artiste of the USSR.

In the course of her career, Kukhar has had support and collaboration of the following ballet teachers, People's Artists of Ukraine and the USSR: Valery Kovtun, Lyudmila Smorgacheva, Nikolai Pryadchenko, Eleonora Steblyak, Raisa Hilko, Elvira Tarasova, Abdyev Recepmyrat.

Among Kukhar's ballet partners are Aleksandr Stoyanov, Leonid Sarafanov, Joseph Gatti, Bakhtiyar Adamjan, Eris Nezha, a principal dancer at the Paris Opéra Garnier, Quer Jérémy-Loup; a principal dancer at Teatro alla Scala, Claudio Coviello.

== Prima Ballerina of the National Opera of Ukraine ==
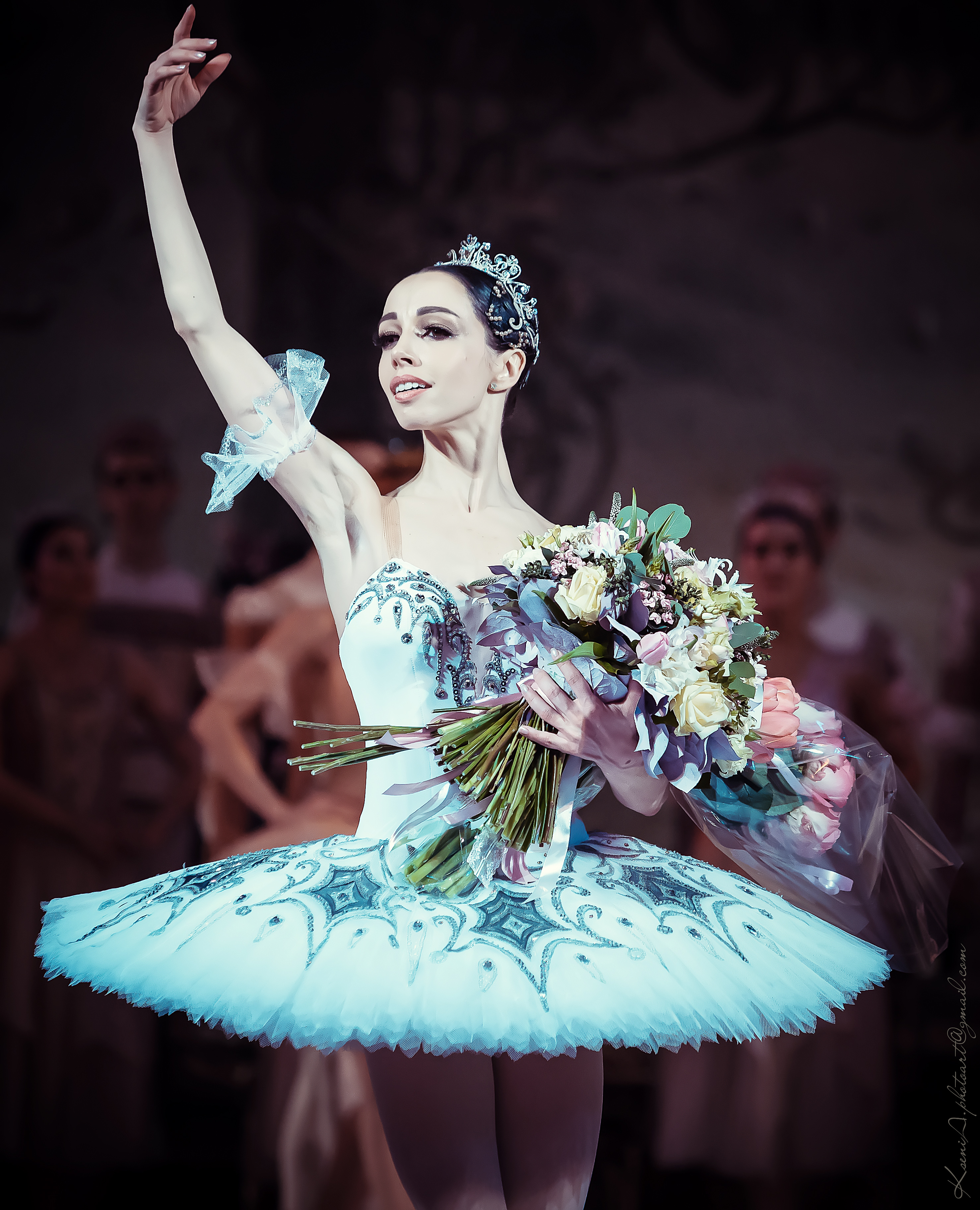

In 1999, after graduating from Kyiv State Ballet School, Kukhar received invitations to work in Madrid Royal Theater, Japanese National Ballet and the National Opera of Ukraine. She accepted the proposal to join the troupe of the National Opera of Ukraine. She has toured Europe, Canada, United States, Japan, Korea, China and other countries. She is a jury member of international ballet competitions and festivals. She is an international dance instructor. At the National Opera of Ukraine, Kukhar dances leading roles in virtually the entire repertoire.

== Festivals and Gala Concerts ==
Kukhar has taken part in many international festivals, including Aoyama Ballet Festival, Japan, Fresh Ballerina Festival, Japan, International Festival of Modern Choreography, Ukraine, the Serge Lifar Festival, IV Miedzynarodowa gala baletowa, Poland, Days of Culture Andorra, Ukraine, Ohrid International Festival, Macedonia.

After Serge Lifar, Kukhar was the first Ukrainian ever to be invited to Paris Ballet Conservatory to be a member of the jury at the state exam.

=== Gala concerts ===
2010 – “Stars of the World Ballet” (Donetsk) 2011 – “Gala Ballet Helps Japan” (Berlin) 2011 – “Ukraine-Poland” (Kraków) 2012 – “Stars of the World Ballet” (Odesa) 2012 – First International Art Festival 2013 – Anniversary evening of Andris Liepa (Chelyabinsk and Saint Petersburg, Oktyabrskiy Big Concert Hall) 2013 – Gala concert “Ballet Masterpieces” of Faruh Ruzimatov, Japan 2015 – Member of the jury at the International Ballet Festival-Competition Tanzolimp, Berlin 2015 – International Ballet Festival in Riga, the 20th Anniversary edition 2015–2016 – Member of the jury at the Seoul International Ballet Competition 2016 – Gala concert in Seoul at the International Ballet Competition 2016 – “Festival Internacional de la Cultura Maya” 2017 – Ballet gala nights at Augsburg and Stockholm 2017 – Grand Gala “Elisa y amigos”, Mexico

=== Jury member at international competitions ===
- 2023, Honorary jury member of Hungarian Ballet Grand Prix in Hungary
- 2023, Member of the admission commission of the National Opera of Ukraine
- Member of the jury at the Paris Conservatory (Conservatoire National Supérieur de Musique et de Danse de Paris)
- Honorary member of the jury at the international competition “Tanzolymp” in 2015, 2019, 2020, 2021, 2022, 2023, 2024, 2025, 2026.
- Honorary member of the jury at Seoul International Dance Competition in 2015 and 2016.
- The head of the jury at "Natalia Skorulskaya all-Ukrainian Assembly of Dance" 2016–2018.
- The head of the jury at “Natalia Skorulska international Assembly of Dance” 2019, 2020, 2021, 2022, 2023, 2024, 2025
- Kateryna is a guest of honor at the closing gala concerts at international competitions.
- She is an invited artiste for the final gala concerts at international competitions. International teacher of ballet workshops at international competitions. Member of the jury at Conservatoire national supérieur de musique et de danse de Paris in 2018.

== International educational activities and workshops ==
2017 and 2018 – workshops on classical ballet lesson and duet at the Conservatoire national supérieur de musique et de danse de Paris. 2018 – workshop on classical ballet lesson in the US at the International Ballet Theater.

== Member of the panel of judges for Dancing with the Stars ==
In 2017, Kukhar got an invitation from the 1+1 TV Channel to become one of the judges at the Ukrainian version of “Dancing with the Stars” TV show (“Танці з Зірками”), together with Dmitry Monatik and Vlad Yama. In 2018, she was invited again to be a judge in Season 2. Kukhar was a member of the panel of judges for the show in Season 4 (2017), Season 5 (2018), Season 6 (2019) and Season 8 (2021). She was also a guest judge for Season 7 (2020).

== A member of the selection committee at National Opera of Ukraine ==
In 2020 and 2021, Kukhar was invited to take the honorary post of a member of the selection committee at the country's first theater, the National Opera of Ukraine.

== Presidential Scholarship Commission ==
In 2021, Kukhar became a member of the Presidential Scholarship Commission.

== Le Palais des Congrès in Paris ==
In 2014, Kukhar was invited to the Palais des Congrès in Paris to perform the role of Juliet with her partner, People's Artiste of Ukraine Aleksandr Stoyanov in the “Romeo and Juliet” ballet. The concert hall seats 3723 people. Performances were sold-out. The pair of Kateryna and Aleksandr alternated with the pair of principal dancers of the Mariinsky Theater Evgenia Obraztsova and her partner. During one week at the Palais des Congrès, the dancers performed six shows for the French audience. Each pair did three shows. Each night was a full house and stunning success.

== Duet with Aleksandr Stoyanov ==
The duet with the People's Artiste of Ukraine, the principal dancer of the National Opera of Ukraine, Aleksandr Stoyanov formed in 2006. Their first joint performance at the National Opera of Ukraine was “The Nutcracker” ballet. A few months later, they went on tour to China with the performances of “Giselle”, “The Sleeping Beauty”, “Swan Lake”, “Romeo and Juliet”. Today, their repertoire includes almost all classical and neoclassical productions of the National Opera of Ukraine. London ballet critic Maggie Foer called the duet “the most beautiful ballet couple in Europe”. In 2011, they participated in Vladimir Malakhov's Charity Gala to help Japan after the Fukushima events. In 2013, Farukh Ruzimatov invited Kateryna and Aleksandr to his Gala Concert in Japan titled “Ballet Masterpieces”. The same year, Andris Liepa invited them to dance at his anniversary event during the Russia and Kazakhstan tour. In 2016, they participated in the Mayan Culture Festival in Mexico along with the principal dancers of the Deutsche Oper Berlin\Berlin Opera, the Bolshoi Theater and the New York City Ballet. For years, Kateryna and Aleksandr have been the favorites of the Ukrainian audiences with their performances being sold-out each time.

== Repertoire ==
- Romeo and Juliet – Juliet
- La Sylphide – The Sylph
- Giselle – Giselle
- Don Quixote – Kitri
- Swan Lake – Odette, Odile
- The Nutcracker – Masha
- Le Corsaire – Gulnara
- Viennese Waltz – Aneli
- The Sleeping Beauty – Princess Aurora
- Cinderella – Cinderella
- Chipolino – Radish
- The Little Mermaid – Little Mermaid
- The Lord of Borisfen – Octavia
- Forest Song – Mavka
- The Wedding of Figaro – Susanna
- Vikings – Princess Elizavetta
- Kapelia – Swanilda
- Daniella – Sophie
- Caprices – Dream
- Snow White – Snow White
- Scheherazade – Zobeide

=== Other works ===
- “Class-concert” by Asaf Messerer
- “Classical pas de deux” by George Balanchine
- “About love” by Anatoliy Shaker
- “Simple things” by Radu Poklitaru
- “The butterfly” by Filippo Taglioni
- “Blind ballerina” by Leonid Yakobson
- “Tarantella” by George Balanchine
- “Children of the night” by Alexander Abdukarimov

== Film, Television ==
2019 – “Velyki Vuiky”, TV series – sorceress 2020 – “Viddana” (“Felix Austria”), feature film – Felix's mother

== Recognitions and awards ==
2012 – Honorary title of Merited Artist of Ukraine 2016 – The Order of Princess Olga of the 3rd degree 2017 – Special award “Pride of Ukraine” 2018 – Honorary title of People's Artist of Ukraine 2019 – Person of the Year. “Ukrainian Idol” Award 2021 – Viva Awards. Kateryna Kukhar and Aleksandr Stoyanov: charity

Kukhar has also won awards for international competitions and festivals, including:

- Prizewinner of the International competition of young ballet dancers «Prix de Lausanne» (Switzerland, 1997)
- International Festival «Aoyama Ballet Festival» and «Fresh Ballerina Festival» (both in Japan, 1997)
- High honors for participation in the 1st International Festival “Dance of the XXI Century (1998)
- International Festival of Modern Choreography (Kyiv, 2000)
- International Choreography Festival (Berlin, 2015)

== Kyiv State Ballet School ==
In 2020 Kukhar was appointed a director of Kyiv State Ballet School, formerly known as Kyiv State Choreographic College – a professional ballet school.

== Personal life ==
Kukhar is married to a principal dancer of National Opera of Ukraine, Aleksandr Stoyanov. They have two children.

== Photo Gallery ==
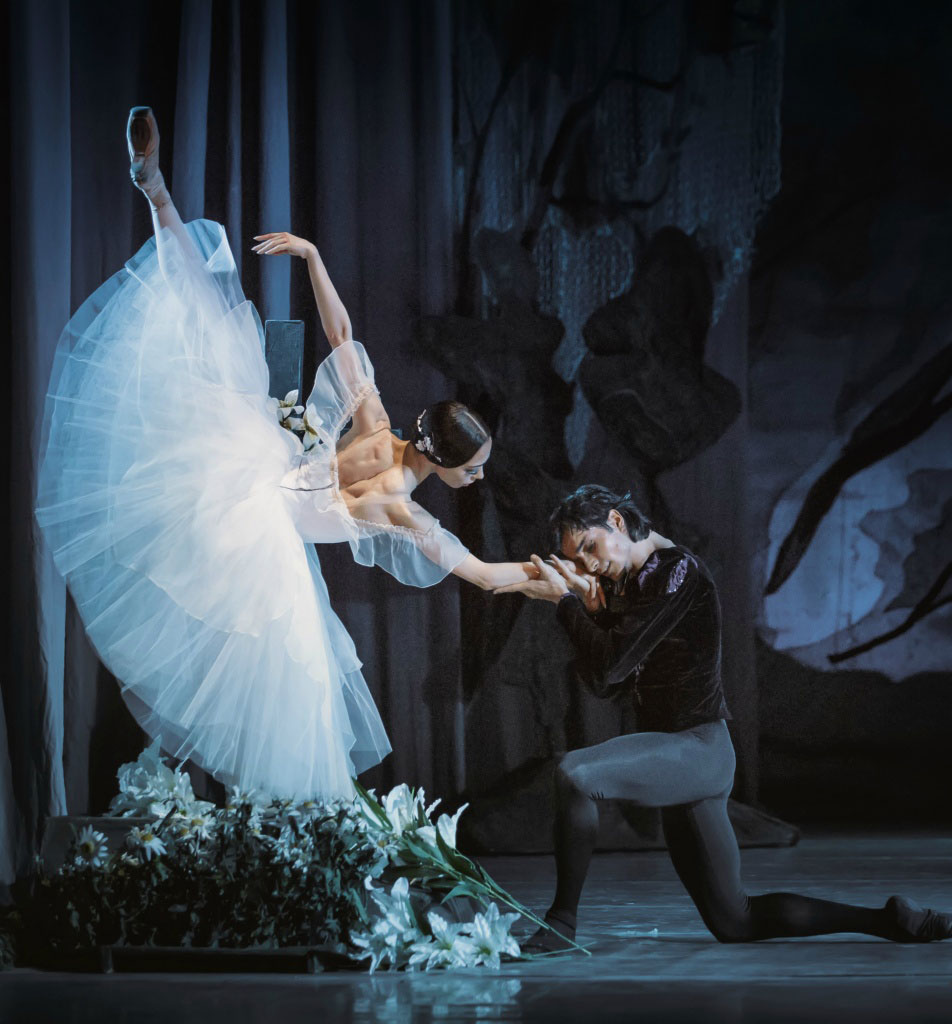

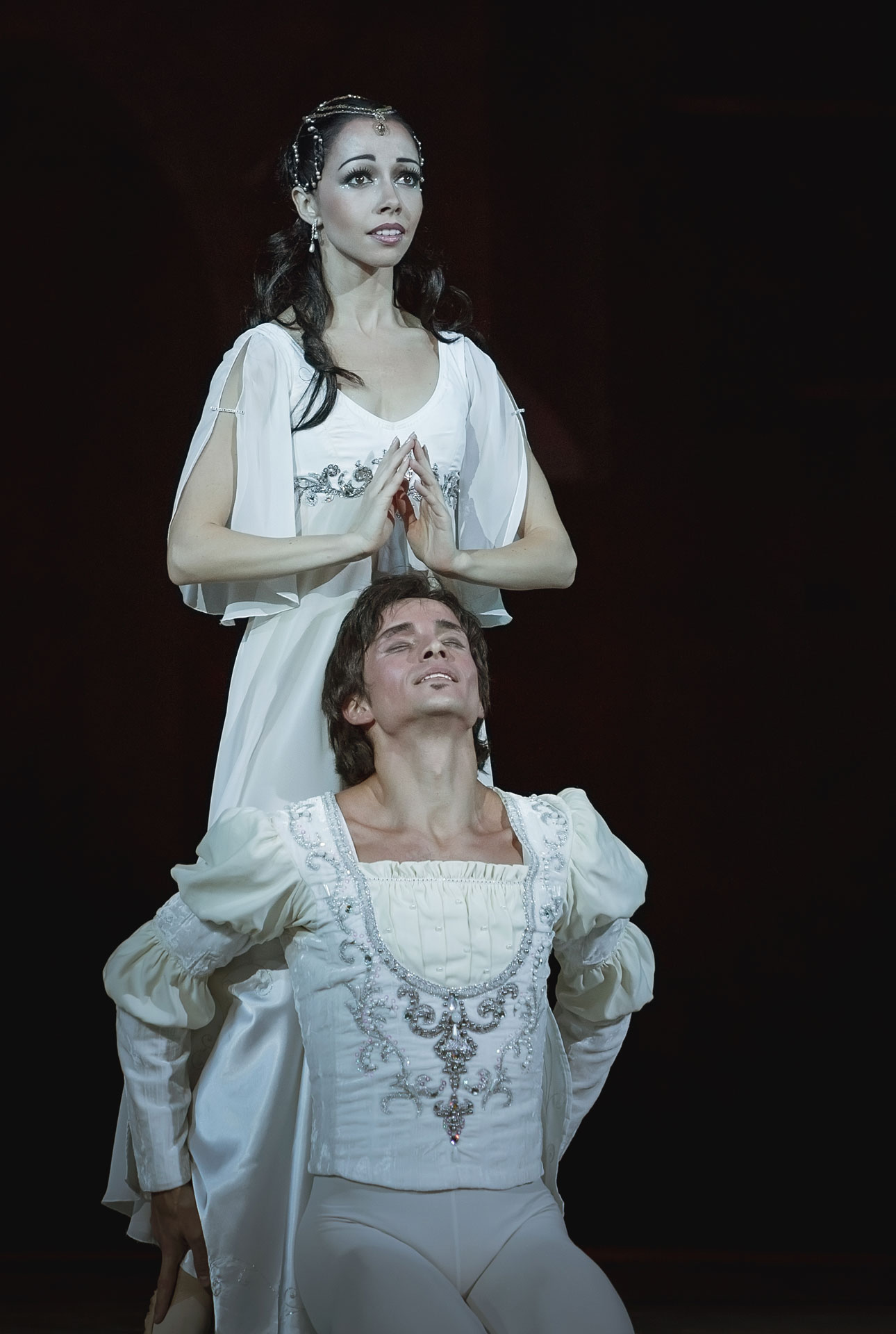

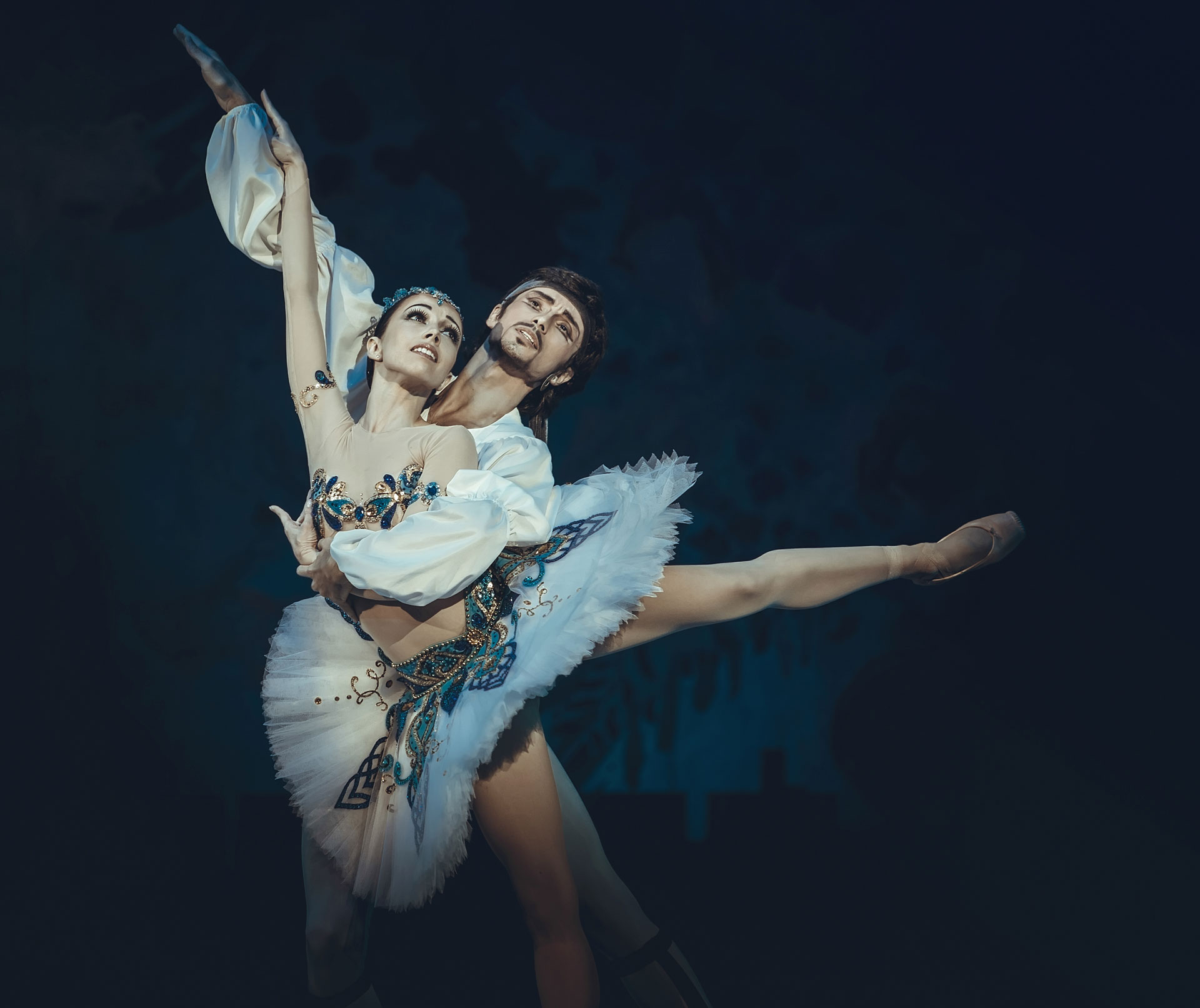

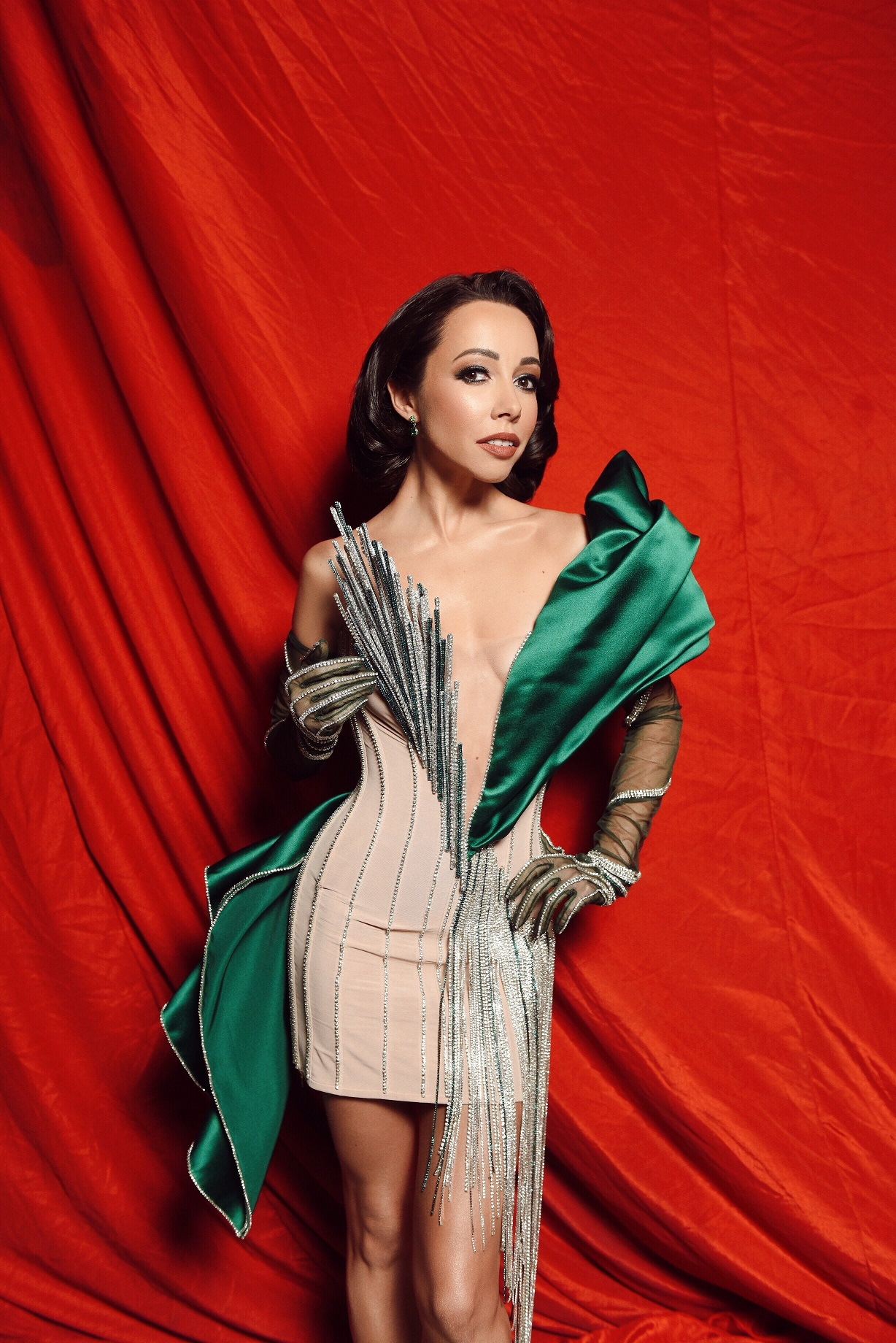

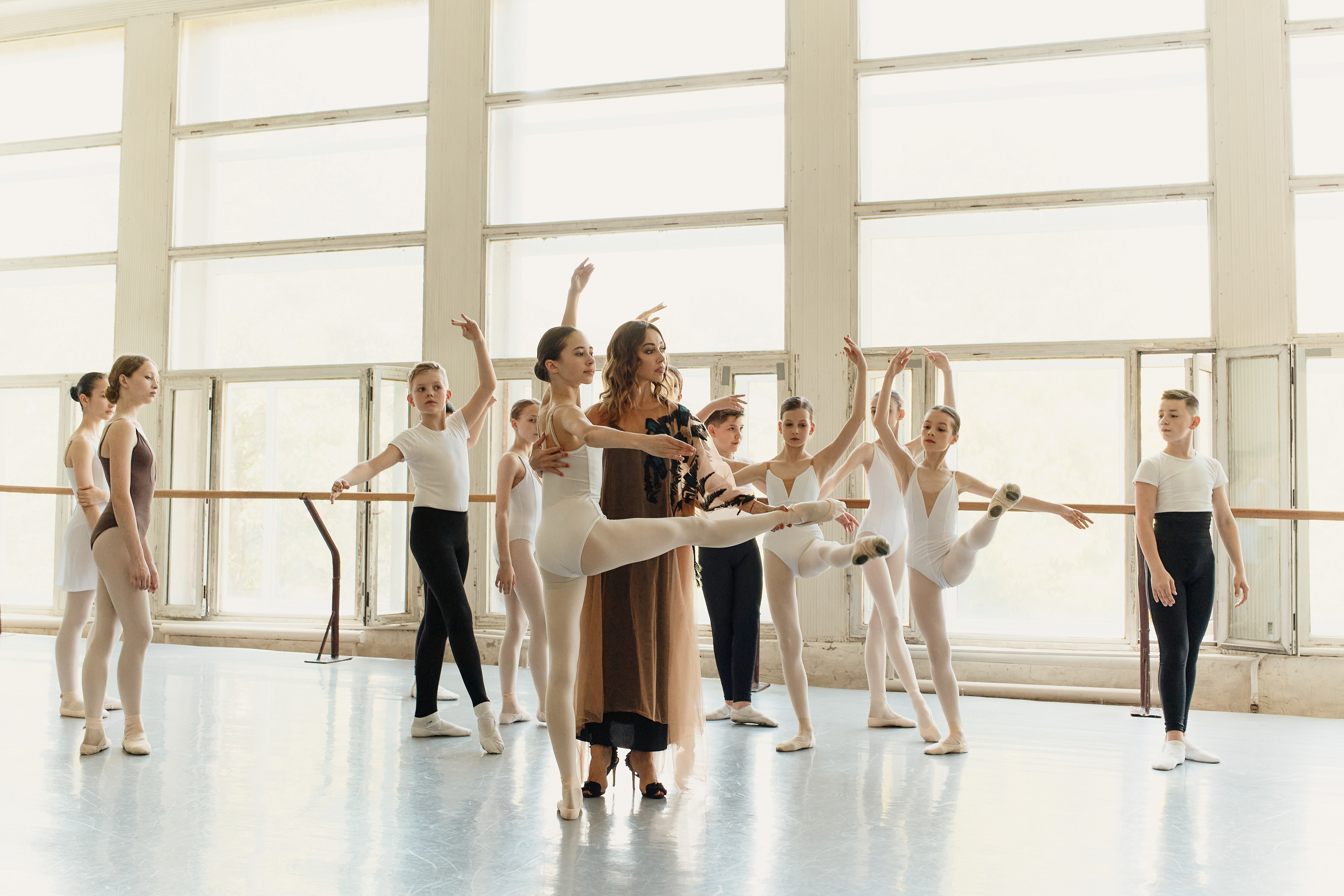

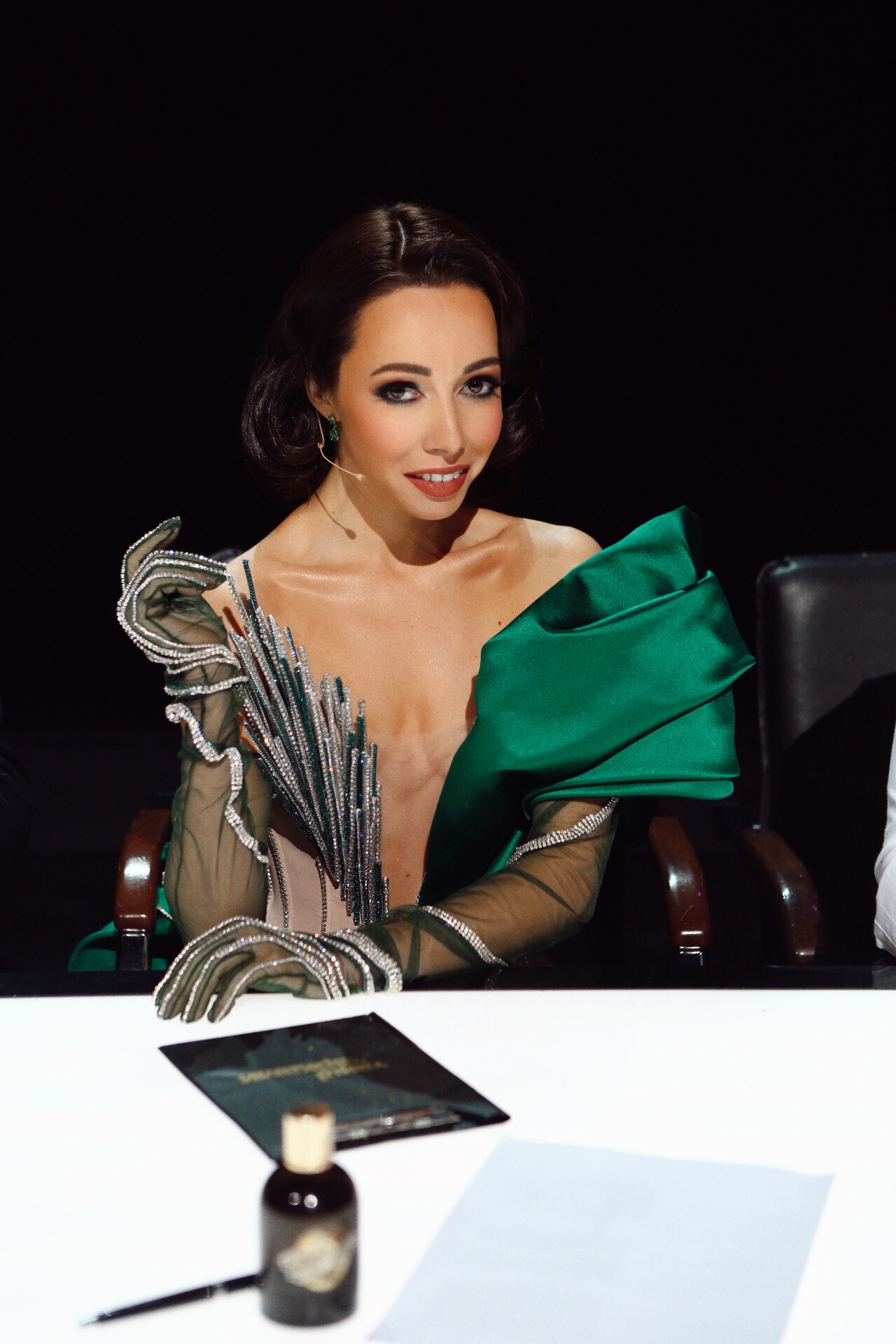

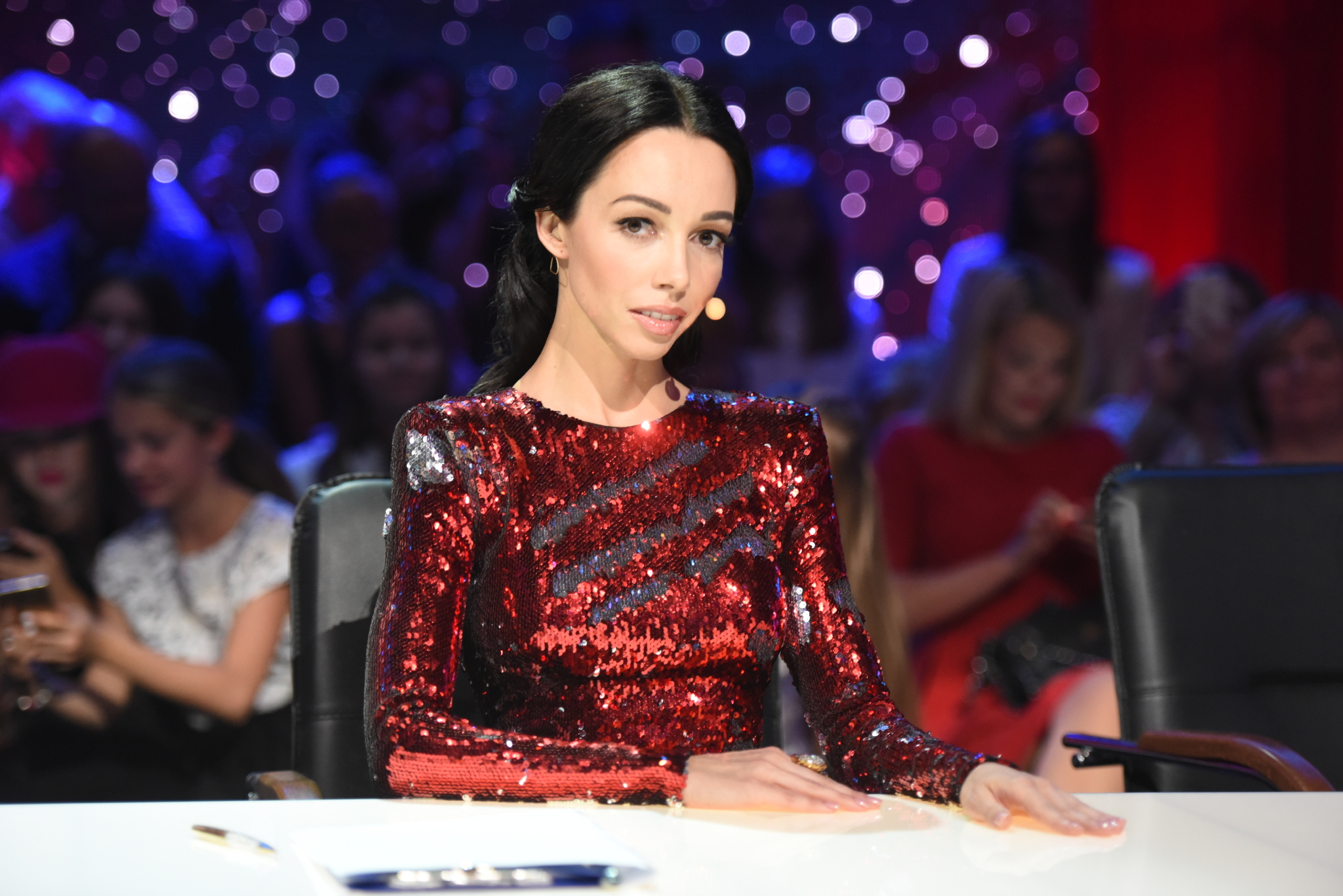

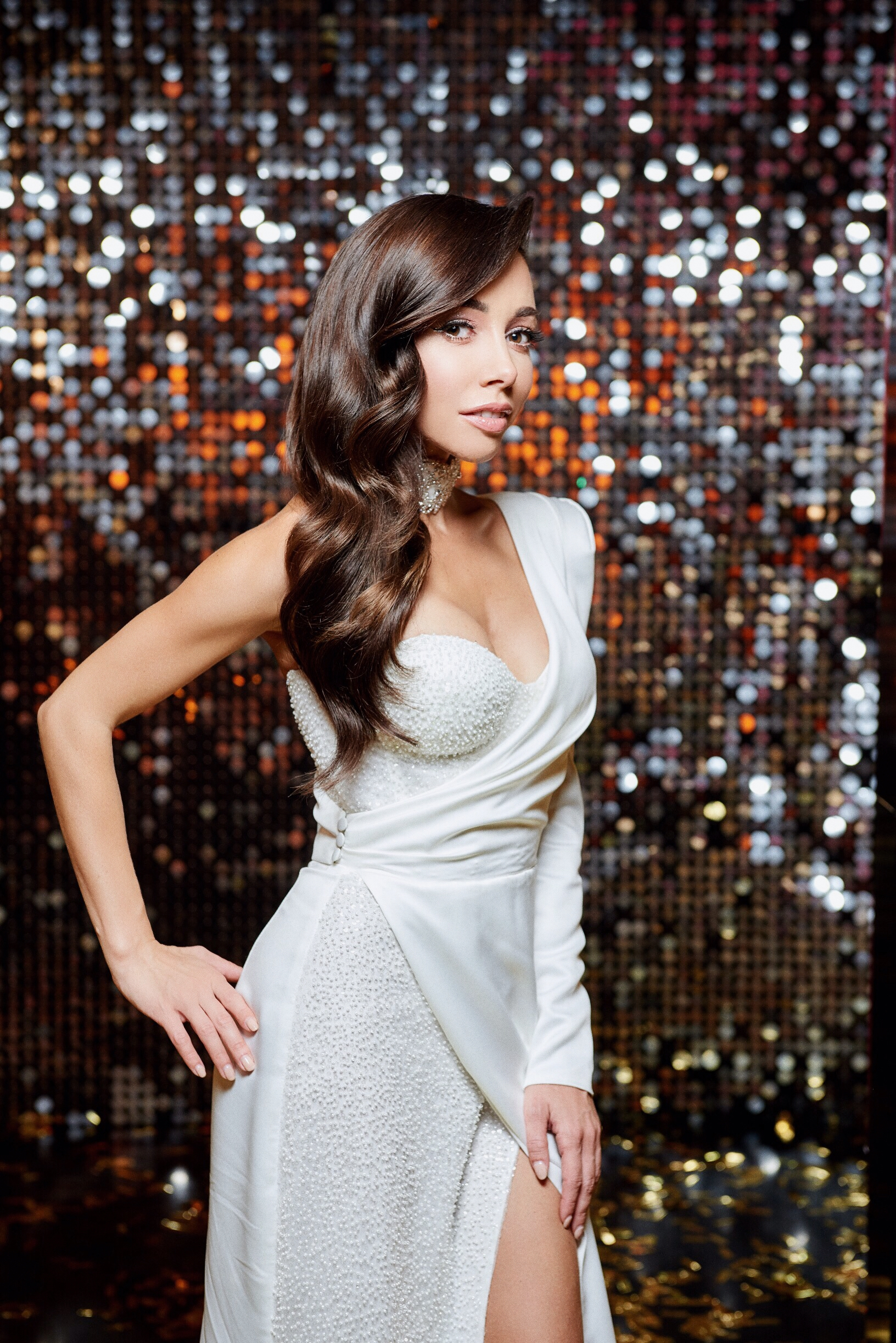

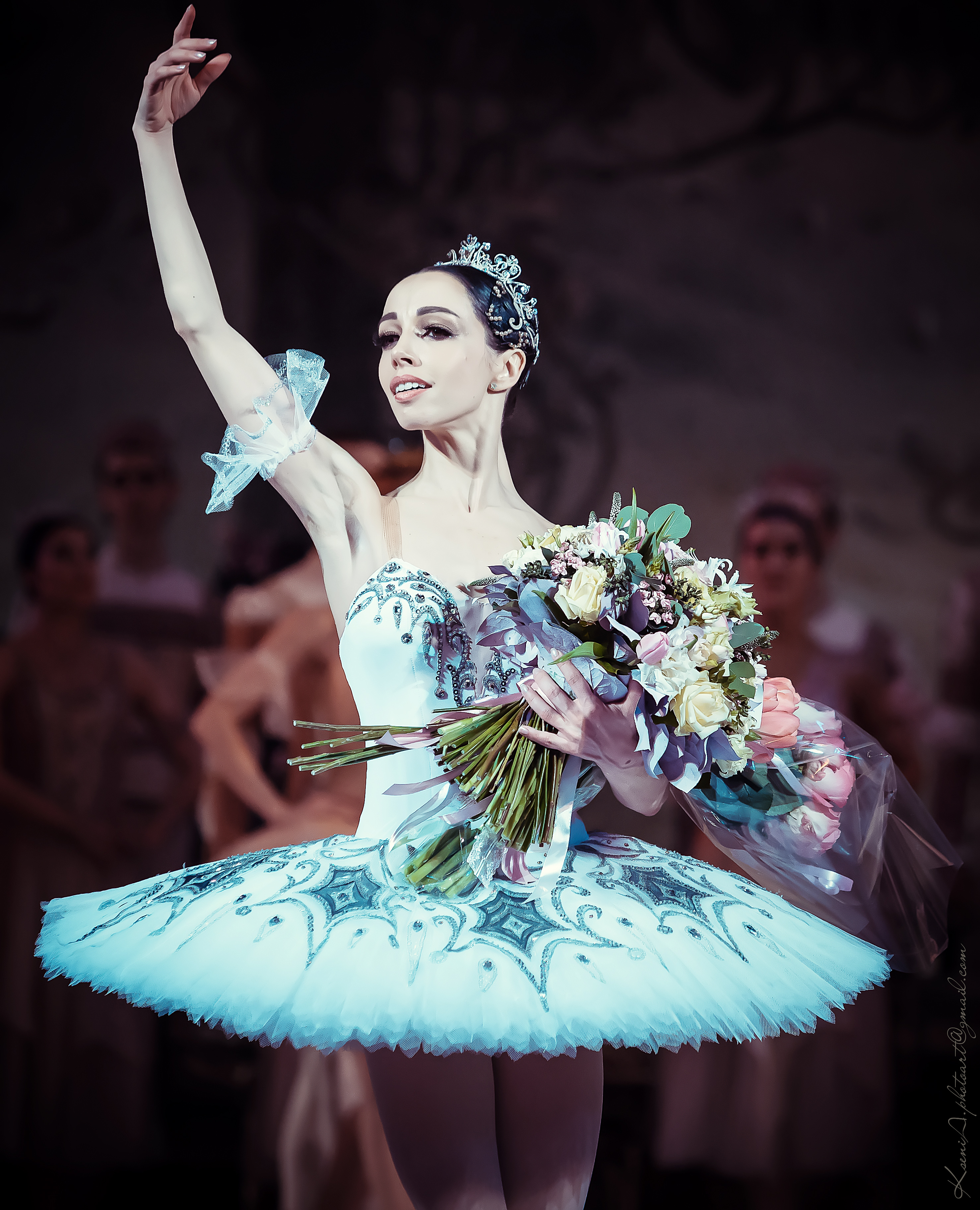

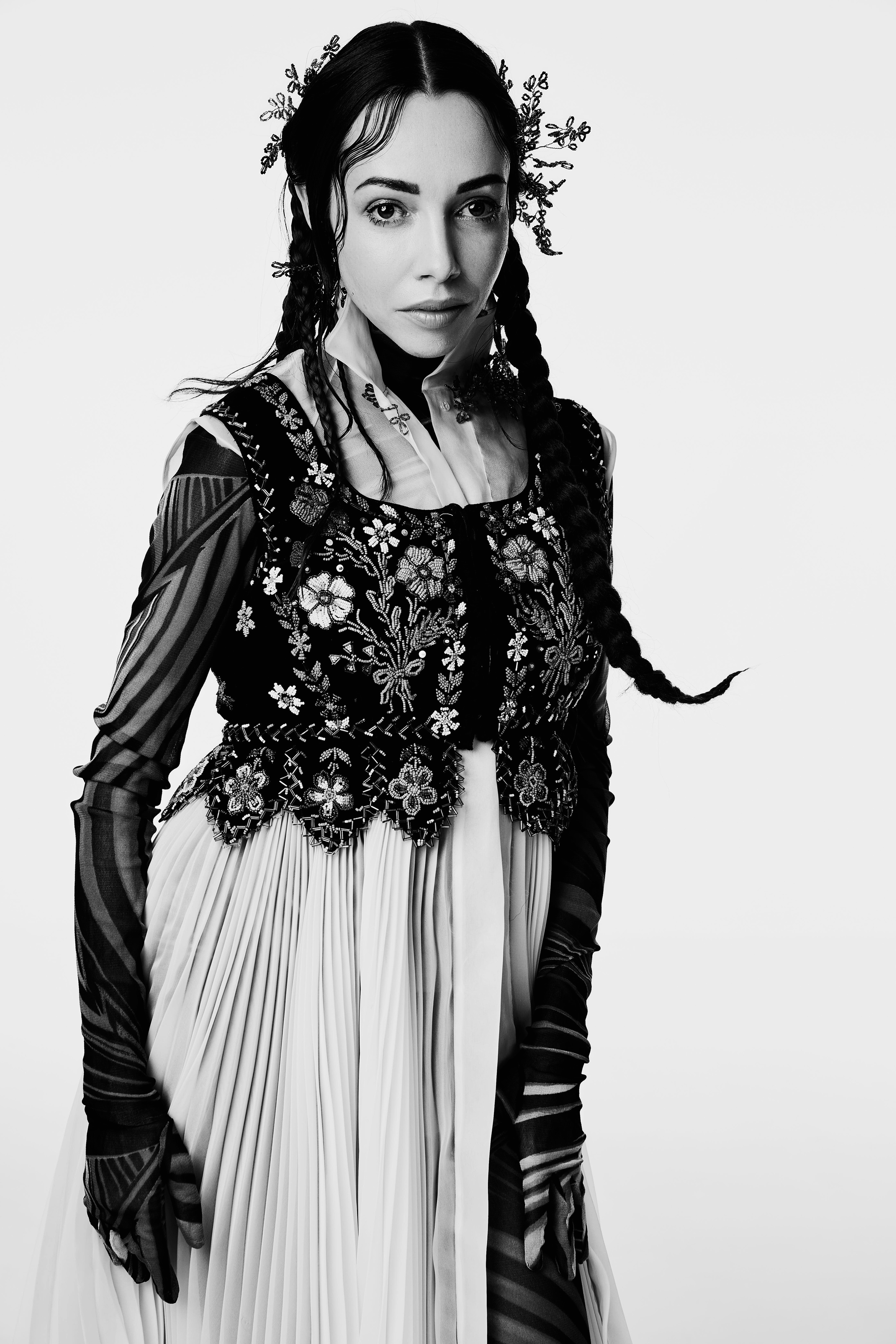
