= People's Artist of Ukraine =

Title of honor

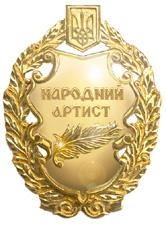
- Type: Order of merit - Honorific title
- Established: 1922
- Country: Ukrainian SSR / Ukraine

People's Artist of Ukraine (Ukrainian: Народний артист України, romanized: Narodnyi artyst Ukrainy) is an honorary title awarded by the government of Ukraine. It is the highest title awarded to outstanding performing artists whose merits are exceptional in the sphere of the development of the performing arts, including theatre, music, dance, circus, and cinema. For visual arts, there is a separate title.

== History ==
Established in 1922 during Soviet times, it was originally called People's Artist of the Ukrainian SSR (Народний артист УРСР). When Ukraine gained independence, this tradition was kept and the title renamed People's Artist of Ukraine (Народний артист України). Its recipients include many highly acclaimed artists.

During Soviet times, a person was usually named People's Artist only after reaching the age of 40. Exceptions were made for ballet artists.

== Other honorary titles ==
Another honorary title, Merited Artist of Ukraine (Ukrainian: Заслужений артист України), is usually conferred prior to being awarded the title, People's Artist of Ukraine. The title, Merited Artist of Ukraine is also translated as Honored Artist of Ukraine, and requires less years of service or performance; typically, the title People's Artist of Ukraine is given at least 10 years after one has earned the title Merited Artist of Ukraine (also translated as Honored Artist of Ukraine).

== List of selected recipients ==
=== People's Painters of Ukraine ===
- Kateryna Vasylivna Bilokur
- Liudmyla Zhogol
- Volodymyr Patyk

=== Theatre, cinema ===
People's Artists of Ukraine in the fields of cinema and theatre include:

- Lidiya Belozyorova, actress
- Stanislav Boklan, Ukrainian theater, film, and television actor
- Volodymyr Bortko, film director, screenwriter, actor, producer
- Borislav Brondukov, actor
- Georgy Deliev, actor and musician
- Mykola Hrynko, actor
- Olha Ilyina, actress and director
- Kirill Lavrov, actor
- Svyatoslav Maksymchuk, actor
- Kira Muratova, film director, screenwriter, actress
- Oksana Petrusenko, opera singer and actress
- Yuriy Rybchynskyi, playwright and poet
- Viktor Stepanov, actor
- Oleh Fialko, film director and screenwriter
- Yuri Ilyenko, film director and screenwriter

=== Dance ===
People's Artists of Ukraine in the field of dance include:

- German Isupov, Choreographer and Ballet Master
- Raisa Khylko
- Katerina Kukhar
- Elena Philipieva
- Tatiana Stepanova, Prima Ballerina

=== Music ===
People's Artists of Ukraine in the field of music include:

- Anatoly Avdievsky, conductor
- Serhiy Bashtan, bandurist (1995)
- Oleksandr Bilash, composer
- Andriy Bobyr, bandurist
- Stepan Hiha, composer and singer
- Vladislav Horai, tenor
- Viktor Hutsal, conductor
- Tina Karol, singer (2017)
- Bogodar Kotorovych, violinist and conductor
- Ivan Kuchuhura Kucherenko, kobzar (1918) and (1925)
- Nadiya Kudelia, Ukrainian coloratura soprano singer
- Alla Kudlai, singer
- Raisa Kyrychenko, singer (1979)
- Ani Lorak, pop singer (revoked in 2024)
- Nina Matviyenko, folk singer
- Yuliy Meitus, composer
- Ruslana, pop singer, Eurovision Song Contest 2004 winner
- Sofia Rotaru, pop-singer, actress (alto)
- Aurelia Rotaru (2019), pop-singer
- Nadiya Shestak (born 1962), Ukrainian singer
- Volodymyr Yesypok, bandurist (2007)
- Taras Petrynenko (1999)
- Jamala, singer, songwriter, winner of Eurovision Song Contest 2016 (2016)
- Verka Serduchka, singer, second place on Eurovision Song Contest (2007)

=== Foreign recipients ===
- Philipp Kirkorov, singer (2008)
- Nikolay Baskov, opera and pop-singer (tenor)
- Sargis Paradzhanov, Soviet, Ukrainian, Armenian and Georgian film director and screenwriter.
- Mikhail Zhvanetsky, writer of comic sketches, among other things
- Hobart Earle, American, long-time maestro of the Odesa Philharmonic (2013)

== See also ==
- Honorary titles of Ukraine
- Merited Artist of Ukraine (also called Honored Artist of Ukraine)
- People's Artist of the USSR
- People's Artist
- List of European art awards
