= List of Ukrainian opera singers =

This is a list of opera singers from Ukraine, Soviet Union and Russian Empire, including ethnic Ukrainians and people of other ethnicities. This list includes those who were born in Ukraine/Soviet Union/Poland but later emigrated, and those, who were born elsewhere but immigrated to the country and performed there for a long time.

Opera came to the Russian Empire in the 18th century. At first there were mostly Italian-language operas presented by Italian opera troupes. Later some Ukrainian composers serving to the Russian Imperial Court such as Dmitry Bortniansky and Maksym Berezovsky began to write operas in French and Italian. Composers in the 19th century included Semen Hulak-Artemovsky, Mykola Lysenko, and Mykhailo Verbytsky. Their traditions were carried on to the 20th century by Yuliy Meitus, Heorhiy Maiboroda, Stanyslav Lyudkevych and Oleksandr Bilash. The Kyiv Opera Theatre continues to be the main opera and ballet venue of Ukraine.

A number of Ukrainian opera singers rose to fame already in the 19th century, but it was the 20th centuries that saw the appearance of many world-renowned, well-remembered and still popular soloists.

== List ==
=== A–L ===
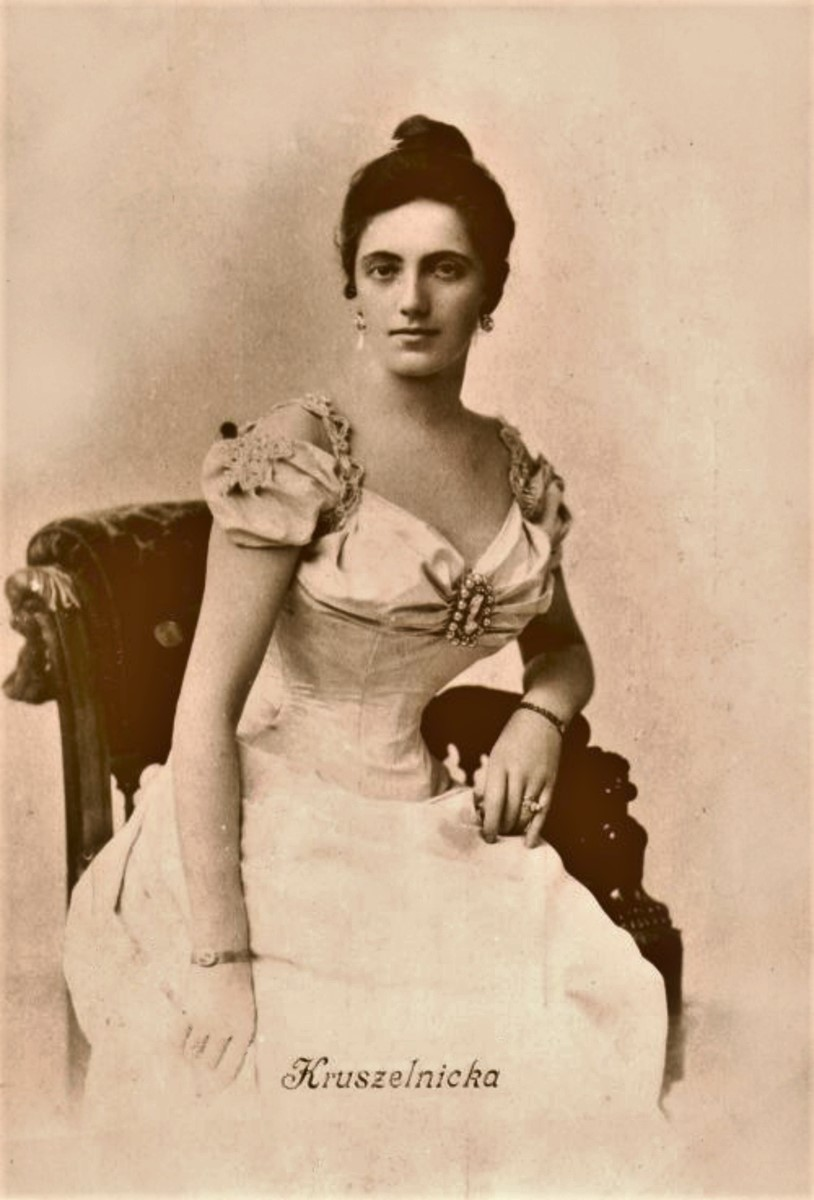
Solomiya Krushelnytska

- Renata Babak
- Lena Belkina
- Olga Bezsmertna
- Andrei Bondarenko
- Andrij Dobriansky
- Oksana Dyka
- Zoia Gaidai
- Vladyslav Gorai
- Borys Hmyria
- Dmytro Hnatyuk
- Kateryna Kasper
- Taras Konoshchenko
- Mykola Koval
- Andriy Kikot
- Alexander Kipnis
- Ivan Kozlovsky
- Solomiya Krushelnytska
- Victoria Loukianetz

=== M–Z ===
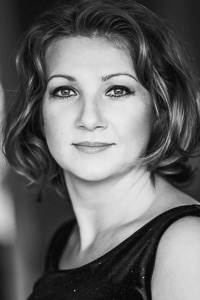
Olga Mykytenko 2012

Mark Reizen

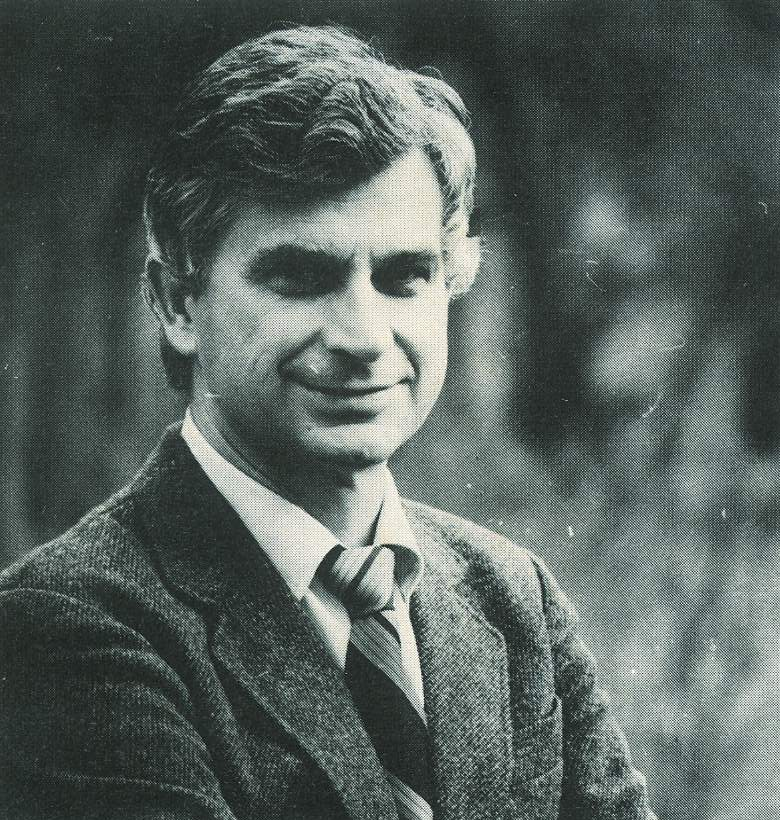
Anatoliy Solovianenko, 1984

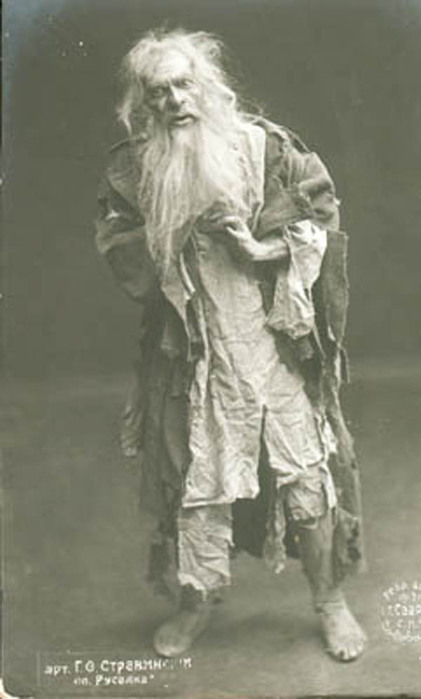
Fyodor Stravinsky
- Yuri Mazurok
- Ira Malaniuk
- Evgeniya Miroshnichenko
- Liudmyla Monastyrska
- Nataliya Oleksandrivna Mykhaylovska
- Olga Mykytenko
- Vyacheslav Polozov
- Misha Raitzin
- Mark Reizen
- Lyudmila Shirina
- Maria Sokil
- Anatoliy Solovianenko
- Mariia Stefiuk
- Fyodor Stravinsky (1843–1902)
- Irena Turkevycz-Martynec
