= Mariia Stefiuk =

Ukrainian opera singer and music teacher

Hero of Ukraine Mariia Stefiuk
- Марія Стефюк
- Born: 16 July 1948 (age 77); Rozhniv, Ukrainian SSR, Soviet Union
- Occupations: Opera singer, music teacher
- Years active: 1972–present
- Awards: Order of Princess Olga; People's Artist of Ukraine; People's Artist of the USSR; Lenin Komsomol Prize; Shevchenko National Prize; Honorary Diploma of the Cabinet of Ministers of Ukraine; Order of Friendship; Hero of Ukraine

Mariia Yuryivna Stefiuk (Ukrainian: Марія Юріївна Стефюк; born 16 July 1948) is a Ukrainian opera singer and music teacher who has been associated with the National Opera of Ukraine and the Tchaikovsky National Music Academy of Ukraine. She began her career as a trainee singer at the Kyiv Opera and Ballet Theater in 1972, after being accepted into the troupe before being made a soloist two years later. Stefiuk has made recordings of her works and taught at the department of solo singing at the Tchaikovsky National Music Academy of Ukraine since 2000.

She has been awarded the Order of Princess Olga, been honored a People's Artist of Ukraine, a People's Artist of the USSR, and received each of the Lenin Komsomol Prize, the Shevchenko National Prize, the Honorary Diploma of the Cabinet of Ministers of Ukraine and the Order of Friendship. Stefiuk was conferred the title of Hero of Ukraine with the Order of the State in 2008.

== Early life ==
Stefiuk was born in the fourteenth house on Boichuka Street in the village of Rozhniv, Kosiv Raion, Ivano-Frankivsk Oblast on 16 July 1948. She is the oldest daughter of the salesperson Maria and Yury Stefiuk, and was named after both the Virgin Mary and Mary's mother. Stefiuk was brought up learning Ukrainian songs, and developed her passion for singing, having had her sing on a non-professional basis. Having not received a formal musical education, she attended the conducting and choral faculty of the Snyatyn Cultural and Educational School between 1963 and 1967, and then went to the vocal faculty of the Kyiv Conservatory under the tuition of Nataliia Zakharchenko from 1967 to 1972.

== Career ==
Upon her graduation, she began her career as a trainee singer at the Kyiv Opera and Ballet Theater (today the National Opera of Ukraine) following her acceptance into the troupe of the capital's opera theater from 1972 before she was made a soloist in 1974. Stefiuk's debut was in the role of Marfa in the opera The Tsar's Bride by Nikolai Rimsky-Korsakov. She has also performed the roles of Maryltsya in Taras Bulba by Mykola Lysenko, the new mermaid On the Water Nymph's Easter by Mykola Leontovych, Milusha in Yaroslav The Wise by Heorhiy Maiboroda, Antonida in A Life for the Tsar by Mikhail Glinka, Violetta and Gilda in Giuseppe Verdi's La traviata, Rigoletto, Rosina in The Barber of Seville by Gioachino Rossini, Musetta in La bohème by Giacomo Puccini, Eurydice in Orfeo ed Euridice by Christoph Willibald Gluck, Marguerite de Valois in Les Huguenots by Giacomo Meyerbeer, Manon in the opera of the same name by Jules Massenet, Lucia in Lucia di Lammermoor by Gaetano Donizetti, Leila in Les pêcheurs de perles by Georges Bizet, A Girl in Into the Storm by Tikhon Khrennikov, Katerina Lvovna Izmailova in Lady Macbeth of Mtsensk by Dmitri Shostakovich, Dunyasha in The Quiet Don by Ivan Dzerzhinsky, Zerlina in Don Giovanni by Wolfgang Amadeus Mozart and Parasya in The Fair at Sorochyntsi by Modest Mussorgsky.

She went on tour in countries such as Australia, Cuba, England, Germany, Japan and the United States among other countries. Stefiuk's works have been recorded on CDs, and she has also appeared on television films such as in the film-opera Natalka Poltavka. She has recorded the works of Johann Sebastian Bach, Giulio Caccini, Luigi Cherubini, George Frideric Handel, Mykola Kolessa, Anatoliy Kos-Anatolsky, Mykola Lysenko, Mozart, Sergei Rachmaninoff, Levko Revutsky, Yakiv Stepovy, Kyrylo Stetsenko, Pyotr Ilyich Tchaikovsky, J. R. R. Tolkien and Verdi among others as well as performing Ukrainian folk songs. She took part in the 1986 Wiesbaden Music Festival and the 1987 Dresden Music Festival. Stefiuk has taught in the department of solo singing at the Petro Tchaikovsky National Music Academy of Ukraine since 2000. Such students she has taught include the operatic singer Oksana Dyka. From 2003, Stefiuk served as the chairperson of the jury of vocalists of the international competition named after Mykola Lysenko. She unsuccessfully stood for election to the Verkhovna Rada in the 2002 Ukrainian parliamentary election. Stefiuk became a member of the Supervisory Board of the Odesa Opera and Ballet Theatre in 2009, and she was on the Committee on the Taras Shevchenko National Award of Ukraine from 2010 to 2016.

== Awards ==
She was awarded the People's Artist of Ukraine and the People's Artist of the USSR in 1979 and August 1985 respectively. Stefiuk won the Lenin Komsomol Prize in 1982, and received the Shevchenko National Prize three years later. She was given the Honorary Diploma of the Cabinet of Ministers of Ukraine in July 1998 "For her significant personal contribution to the development of national art, high professional skill". That same month, Stefiuk was appointed to the Order of Princess Olga, 3rd Class "For a significant personal contribution to the development of culture and art of Ukraine". She was upgraded to the Order of Princess Olga, 2nd Class in September 2001 "For a significant personal contribution to the development of Ukrainian opera and ballet art, high professionalism".

In January 2003, she was awarded the Order of Friendship by Russian president Vladimir Putin "for a great contribution to the development of art and the strengthening of Russian-Ukrainian cultural ties." In the same year, Stefiuk was upgraded to the Order of Princess Olga, 1st Class "For a significant personal contribution to the development of Ukrainian culture and art, many years of creative activity and high performance skills". She was conferred the title of Hero of Ukraine with the Order of the State by Ukrainian president Viktor Yushchenko in July 2008 "For a significant personal contribution to the development of Ukrainian culture and art, significant creative achievements and on the occasion of the 140th anniversary of the founding of the National Academic Opera and Ballet Theater".
