= Nina Matviienko =

Ukrainian singer (1947–2023)

Hero of Ukraine People's Artist Nina Matviienko Ніна Матвієнко
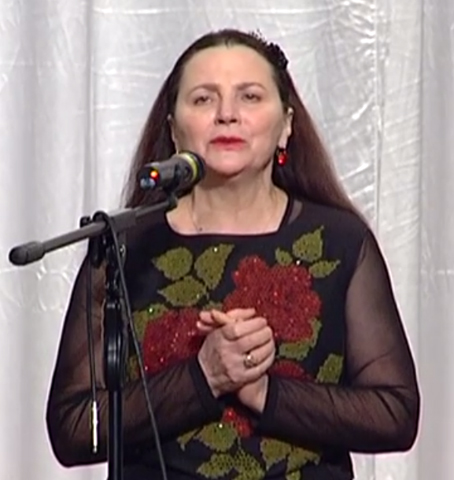
- Matviienko in 2012

Background information
- Born: 10 October 1947; Nedilyshche, Ukrainian SSR, Soviet Union
- Died: 8 October 2023 (aged 75) Kyiv, Ukraine
- Genres: Folk, pop
- Occupations: Singer, actress
- Instrument: Vocals
- Years active: 1968-2023
- Spouse: Petro Honchar

Nina Mytrofanivna Matviienko (Ukrainian: Ніна Митрофанівна Матвієнко; 10 October 1947 – 8 October 2023) was a Ukrainian singer.

== Life and career ==
Matviienko was born on 10 October 1947 in village of Nedilyshche, at the time in the Ukrainian SSR in the Soviet Union (today Ukraine). She was the fifth of eleven siblings, her mother was Antonina Ilkivna and father, Mytrofan Ustynovych. She began at a local residential school, then worked as a copyist and then a crane-operator's assistant. She completed her studies in Ukrainian philology at the Kyiv University in 1975. She had previously entered the vocal studio of the Ukrainian State Folk Choir named after Hryhory Veriovka in 1968, before becoming a soloist. She married Petro Honchar and the couple had three children. The marriage ended in divorce.

In 1988 Matviienko received the Shevchenko National Prize, a Ukrainian State prize named after Taras Shevchenko, and also acted in Yuri Ilyenko's Ukraine war drama film Solomennye Kolokola.

Matviienko's repertoire includes numerous Ukrainian folk songs. Nina is the first performer of works by the composers Yevhen Stankovych, Myroslav Skoryk, Iryna Kyrylina, Hanna Havrylets and many others. She has performed on television in numerous films and on radio.

From 1966 to 1991, Matviienko was a soloist of the Ukrainian State Folk Choir. From 1968 a member of the folk trio "Zoloti kliuchi". In recent times she has been performing with the Kyiv Camerata orchestra, and the Kostyantyn Chechenya Early Music Ensemble.

Matviienko performed in Mexico, Canada, the United States, Czechoslovakia, Poland, Finland, Korea, France, Latin America. She has numerous recordings of Ukrainian folk songs. In 2009, she published a book (of about 250 folk songs), about her life and career, and her love of the 'soul music' of her native land. In reviewing her work, the academic Mykola Zhulynskyi from the National Academy of Sciences of Ukraine, and the Taras Shevchenko Institute of Literature described Matviienko as someone who 'lives by songs and relishes in the song-making process, in her affinity with the song, opening for it her own soul and for the soul of the Ukrainian people after the shadows of servitude.'

During the 2022 Russian invasion of Ukraine, Matviienko's performance of Yevhen Stankovych's opera-ballet When the Fern Blooms, which had originally premiered in 2017 after a ban during the Soviet era, was live-streamed by the Lviv National Opera was re-released online.

=== Death ===
Nina Matviienko died on 8 October 2023, aged 75.

== Awards ==
- 1988 Taras Shevchenko Prize of Ukraine
- 1996 International M. A. Kasyan Prize Fund – Order of Mykola Chudotvorets
- 1997 Ukraine Order of Princess Olga, third class
- 2006 Hero of Ukraine
- 2017 Person of the Year

== Discography ==
- Nina Matviienko: Kolyskova zori. (Lullaby to a evening-glow)
- Nina Matviienko: Molytva (Prayer)
- Nina Matviienko: Osin', tkak myla. Golden Collection. (Autumn, So Nice)
- Ancient Music Ensemble of Kostjantin Chechenja, Nina Matviienko. Vsyakomu Horodu Nrav i Prava. (Every City to Have Its Habits and Laws)

and Nina Matviienko: recording for World Folk Vision 2020

and Nina Matviienko book 'Oi, vyoriu nyvku shyrokuiu (I'll Plow a Broad Furrow)'
