= Stepanyuk =

Stepanyuk or Stepaniuk (Ukrainian or Russian: Степанюк) is a gender-neutral Ukrainian surname that originates from the masculine given name Stepan. The Stepaniuk surname ranks 197,721st globally. It may refer to

- Darya Stepanyuk (born 1990) is a Ukrainian swimmer
- Kamila Lićwinko (née Stepaniuk in 1986), Polish high jumper
- Oksana Stepanyuk (born 1977), Ukrainian opera singer
- Ruslan Stepanyuk (born 1992), Ukrainian footballer
- Yuri Stepaniuk (born 1983), Ukrainian footballer
