= Eva Hadashi =

Ukrainian scientist

Yevgeniya Suda
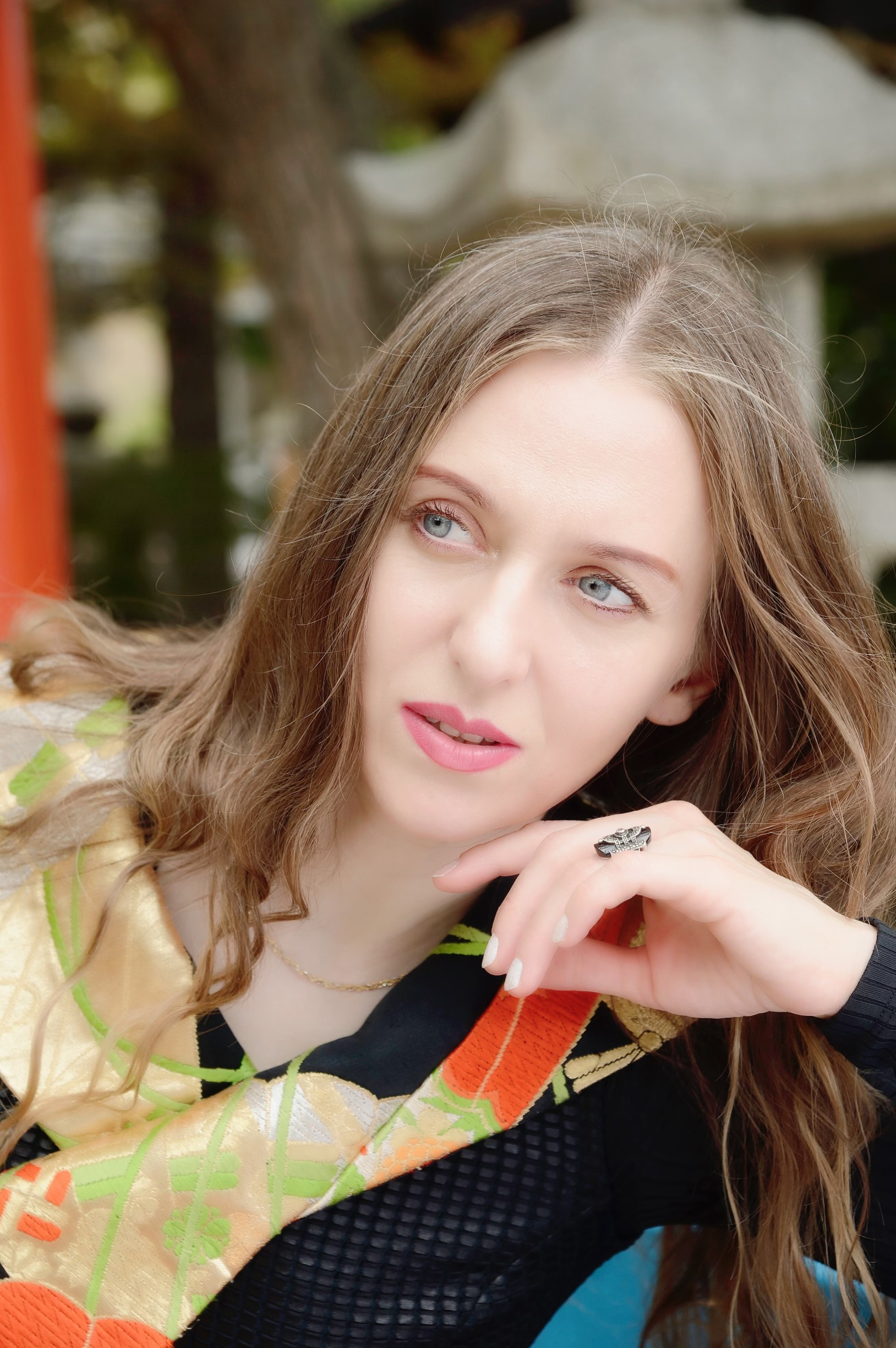
- Born: August 7, 1975 (age 51)
- Other names: Ukrainian: Єва Хадаші; Yevgeniya Suda
- Citizenship: Ukraine
- Education: Kyiv Conservatory; Taras Shevchenko National University of Kyiv
- Known for: japanologist writer

Eva Hadashi (pseudonym of Yevgeniya Suda; August 7, 1975, Kyiv, Ukraine) is a Ukrainian scholar, Doctor of Philosophy (in musicology), Master of Philology, japanologist, musicologist, writer, singer, TV and radio personality. A researcher of Western influences on the Japanese musical art in Meiji period, a laureate of International Literary Contest Coronation of the Word for the novel Western Geisha (2019).

== Background ==
Yevgeniya Suda was born on August 7, 1975, in Kyiv.

In 1995 she graduated from R. Glier Kyiv Institute of Music, specializing in choral conducting. In 2000 she graduated with honours from the National Music Academy of Ukraine named after P.I. Tchaikovsky, majoring in choral conducting. She was a student of a rector of National Music Academy of Ukraine – professor, People's Artist of Ukraine Oleg Tymoshenko. From 2000 to 2004 she studied Japanese language and literature, English at Taras Shevchenko National University of Kyiv (graduated with honours). From the first year of her study she began to work actively in the direction of establishing a cultural dialogue between Ukraine and Japan.

In 2001 she went to Japan as a manager-interpreter with an outstanding Ukrainian jazz singer Olga Voichenko for Asakusa Jazz Contest (Tokyo). She signed a contract with a Japanese production company as a manager-interpreter and a singer in the last year of her Master's studies. She produced in Japan a Ukrainian opera singer and bandura player Oksana Stepanyuk, now a soloist at Tokyo Fujiwara Opera.

In 2003 she took a short-term course at Berklee College of Music (US), majoring in jazz vocal. A graduate of this college, majoring in jazz composition and guitar, becomes Yevgeniya's husband. The wedding took place in 2003, the couple lives mainly in Japan. Preparing for her motherhood Yevgeniya terminates her employment contract, and from 2012 to 2017 the divorce trial goes on. During that period she wrote her debut autobiographical novel Western Geisha (published in 2016).

In 2011 she performs in a project Dialogue of Cultures: Ukraine – Japan, dedicated to Chernobyl disaster and Fukushima Daiichi nuclear disaster, as a manager, translator/interpreter, as well as a main solo singer in the central work of the project – Chamber Symphony Cicadas’ Prayer by Vasyl Pylypchak, performed by National Presidential Band of Ukraine and directed by a Japanese conductor Takashi Ueno.

== Japanology and literary works ==
A story of her debut novel Western Geisha is autobiographical. A musician by her first major Yevgeniya travels to the United States for a short-term study at Berklee College of Music, where she meets her future Japanese husband, a graduate of this college – a jazz composer and a guitarist. The manuscript of the novel is accepted for publication by a literary magazine Rainbow. Its shortened version is published in No. 3-4 in 2016. The novel is published under a pseudonym Eva Hadashi, which means barefoot in Japanese. The complete Ukrainian manuscript of Western Geisha took part in International Literary Contest Coronation of the Word. According to the results of 2019, the novel received a special award International Recognition.

The novel Western Geisha is published in Ukrainian, Russian and Japanese. The first Japanese edition (2020), as well as the second Ukrainian edition (2021), became a joint Ukrainian-Japanese project: the publishing house Raduga (Ukraine) and the publishing house Dnepr (Japan) with the assistance of the Japanese-Ukrainian Association for Cultural Exchange.

In February 2021, a presentation of the Japanese edition of the novel took place in Tokyo at the Embassy of Ukraine in Japan. The event had a wide international resonance.

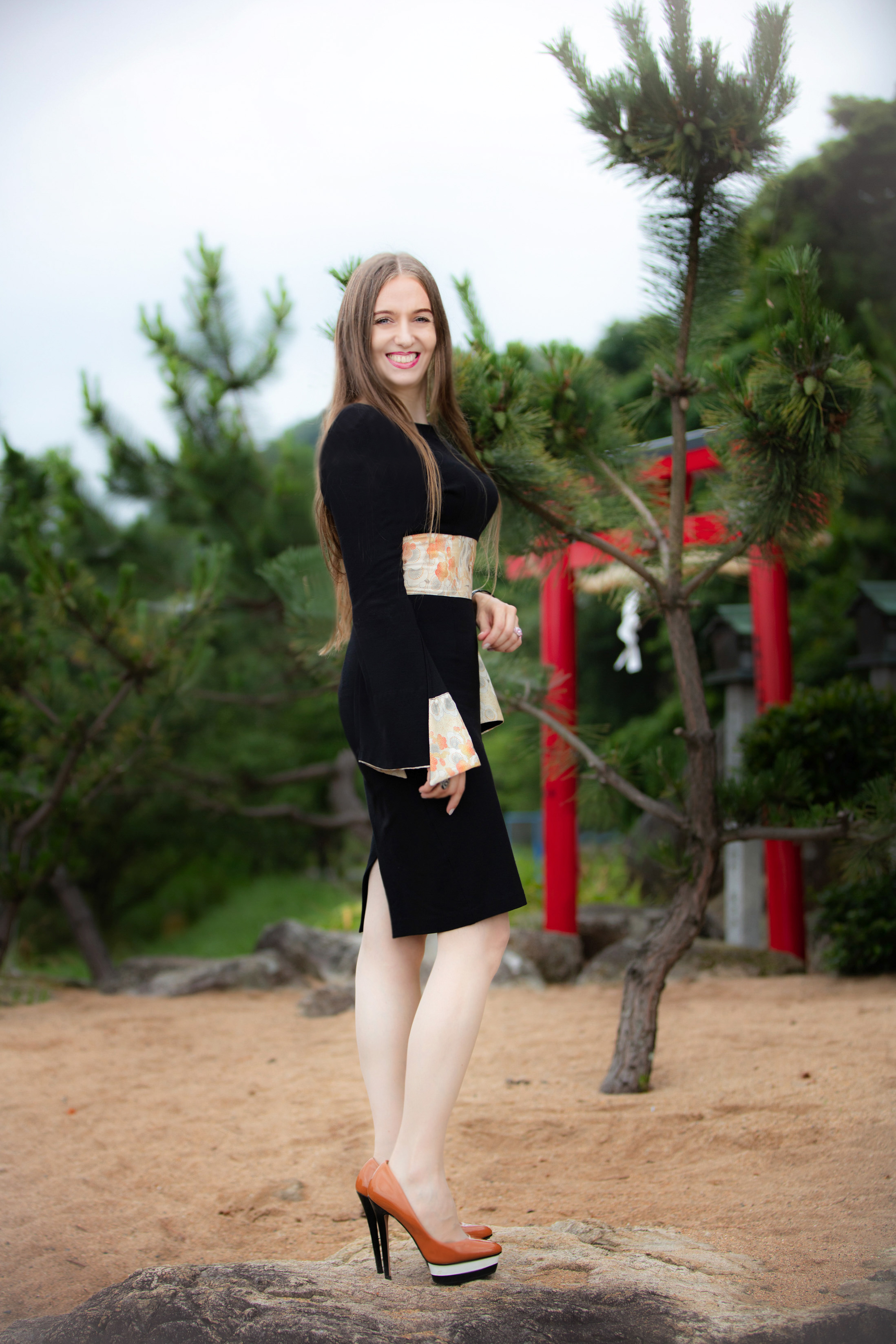
Eva Hadashi

In 2017, at National Music Academy of Ukraine named after P.I. Tchaikovsky, Yevgeniya defended her doctoral dissertation Western influences on the Japanese music in Meiji period (1868–1912). In 2019 a publishing house Musical Ukraine published a monograph of the same name. The work is dedicated to the beginning stages of the interaction of Western and Japanese music in Meiji era (1868–1912), which is foremost linked to the military, religious and educational fields. The research indicates the premises of introduction of westerly music in Japan; shows the role of Western-style military conductors and orchestras in the development of the Japanese music life of the period; presents the way of introducing Orthodox Christian music into religious life in Japan and further processes of the traditional choir development; depicts the impact of the music doers Iacob Tihai and Dmytro Livovsky in this process; marks the results and further perspectives of educational reforms of Shuji Isawa and Luther Whiting Mason; traces the history line and shows the foundation of the first Western-style music educational establishment – Tokyo Academy of Music; demonstrates the nascence of Western-style composer's school in Japan, the genesis of the opera traditions; and also it specifies the Japanese national features of familiarization with the Western music art.

Irina Drach, Doctor of Art History, a professor of History of Ukrainian and Foreign Music Department at Kharkiv National Kotlyarevsky University of Arts, observes that Yevgeniya Suda managed to move away from usual mythical ideas about "the Japanese exoticism". She examines the Japanese musical world from the inside, finds out how the modernization of Japan took place in the second half of the 19th century, when the country was in a state of the Middle Ages facing the challenges of the new time. This approach is very relevant for Ukraine, since, following the examples of the musical arts development, it allows to comprehend the reforms, which have created favorable preconditions for the implementation of the well-known 'Japanese economic miracle' in the future. A professor of the Russian language at Tenri University Motohiro Ono (小野元裕) emphasizes not only a relevance of the research, but also its uniqueness: Despite the fact that the Japanese art is a subject of a keen interest of scientists from many countries, it is surprisingly rarely examined. The Japanese musical art, in particular Western influences on its music and culture, have been insufficiently explored.

The main aspect of her creative and scholarly activities is determined by developing a fruitful dialogue between Western and Eastern cultures. She is also involved in a popular culture in this direction. In particular, she writes popular songs in Japanese. Her CD "West and East" consists entirely of her original songs in Japanese, and is intended for a modern young audience. A fragment of her song Could You Put This Dress On Me? was used in a feature film Steel Angie by a Japanese director Toshinari Yonishi, and her song I Love You Very Much, after two qualifying rounds, reached the final in Grand Prix: Anime Song contest.

She is an author and a host of the program Modern Japan on Blackan Radio TV Japan, which focuses on the issues of speed reading in Japanese, transformations in the modern calligraphy, future of the Japanese cinema, modern kimono and its transformations, as well as perspectives on the Ukrainian-Japanese cultural relations (broadcast in Japanese). She is also a fashion model of elegant and sporty clothing for the Japanese designers (Yumeya Hachiman, Takako Hotta, Kimono Nakanokou).

In summer 2020, she began to work on a sequel of her novel Western Geisha. A working title of the new book is Defamation.

During the Russian invasion of Ukraine in 2022, she actively supports her country, helps refugers, takes part in charity concerts and events. She also actively works as a translator and researcher for leading Japanese television companies (NHK, Fuji Television, TBS Television, TV Asahi and others) for news and informational programs, which broadcast about the events of the war.

== Bibliography ==
- Eva Hadashi Western Geisha (Ukrainian: Західна гейша) (2016)
- Yevgeniya Suda Western influences on the Japanese music in Meiji period (1868–1912) (Russian: Западные влияния в музыкальном искусстве Японии периода Мейдзи (1868–1912)) (2019)
- Eva Hadashi Crossing the Oebashi bridge (Ukrainian: Перетинаючи міст Оебасі, short story) (Literary magazine Kyiv 1—2. 2021)
- Eva Hadashi Is it worthy? (Ukrainian: Чи варто?, short story) (Literary magazine Kyiv 1—2. 2022)

Publications

- Batozhna E. [Suda Y. L.]. Western musical influences on the Japanese educational system in Meiji period. – Kyiv: Kyiv Musicology: a collection of articles. – Vol. 14, 2004. – P. 7–15. – ("Scientific Thought of the Youth": Coll. – Book 2.)
- Suda Y. L. Historical backgrounds of the penetration of Western music in Japan. – Kyiv: Publishing Center of KNLU, NMAU P.I. Tchaikovsky. – Theoretical issues of culture, education and upbringing: a collection of scientific papers. – Vol. 33. – P. 124–129. – ("Scientific Thought of the Youth": Coll. – Book 2.)
- Suda Y. Western influences on the Japanese military music. – Kyiv: Scientific Bulletin of National Music Academy of Ukraine P.I. Tchaikovsky – Vol. 76: Problems of musical art: heritage and modernity, 2008. – P. 193–206. – ("Scientific Thought of the Youth": Coll. – Book 2.)
- Suda Y. Ukrainian-Japanese musical relations and modernity (to the 20th anniversary of the establishment of diplomatic relations between Ukraine and Japan). – Kyiv: Scientific Bulletin of National Music Academy of Ukraine P.I. Tchaikovsky. – Vol. 106: Cultural aspects of contemporary art discourse / in memory of Lyudmila Konstantinovna Kaverina: collection, 2013. – P. 300–311.
- Suda Y. L. Features of the Japanese traditional music (before Meiji period). – Kyiv: Kyiv Musicology. Culture and art history: coll. – Vol. 32.: NMAU P.I. Tchaikovsky; KIM R.M. Glier, 2010. – P. 199–209.
- Suda Y. The origin and the initial stage of the development of opera in Japan [Electronic resource]. – Israel XXI: music magazine, 2015. – P. 199–209.

== Show business ==
For her debut novel she recorded and released musical illustrations – CD Western Geisha (2016). Then she released CDs Nice to Meet You (2018) and West and East (2019) – consisted of her original songs in Japanese. In 2019 she reached the final in Grand Prix: Anime Song Contest (Osaka, Japan) with her original song in Japanese I Love You Very Much.

In 2016 she became a finalist of Classical Crossover Contest (Tokyo, Japan) performing Amazing Grace and Love Theme from the movie Cinema Paradiso. In 2018 she took a part in a beauty contest Miss June Bride (Osaka, Japan) and became a winner in the middle age category – Bimajo. In the same year (2018), she appeared as a singer in a feature film Steel Angie directed by Toshinari Yonishi, then as a foreign student in a feature film Come and Go (2019) directed by Lim Kah Wai. The film Come and Go was premiered at Tokyo International Film Festival in 2020.

From July 2022, in collaboration with a Japanese singer Aki Ono, she hosts the program Ukrainian Identity on FM CYAO radio station. The program is aimed to heal the Ukrainian evacuees in Japan, covering such aspects as Ukrainian history, culture, traditions, music, linguistic, practical advises, etc. The program is provided by the Japanese-Ukrainian Association for Cultural Exchange and assisted by the newspaper East Osaka.

As a singer, writer, interpreter, actress, radio personality, Eva Hadashi collaborates with the Japanese media, appearing in the Japanese informational and news programs such as NHK News, MBS News, Houdou Runner, Kansai News, Kansai Nesshisen, Ohayo Kansai, Hot Kansai; major newspapers such as Sankei, Asahi, Yomiuri; FM radio stations in the programs such as POWER OF MUSIC – The Music We Wanna Listen To Right Now, Kaburitsuki Friday, PEOPLE – The Newspaper.
