= Hrafske =

Hrafske (Ukrainian: Графське) may refer to the following places in Ukraine:

- Hrafske, Donetsk Oblast, urban-type settlement in Volnovakha Raion
- Hrafske, Kharkiv Oblast, village in Chuhuiv Raion
- Hrafske, Sumy Oblast, village in Sumy Raion
