= Olga (ballet) =

1981 two-act ballet by Yevhen Stankovych and Yuriy Ilyenko

- Native title: Ольга
- Choreographer: Anatoliy Shekera
- Music: Yevhen Stankovych
- Libretto: Yuriy Ilyenko
- Based on: The Life of Olga of Kiev
- Premiere: 1981
- Design: Fedir Nirod

Olga (Ukrainian: Ольга, romanized: Ol'ha) is a two-act ballet by Ukrainian composer Yevhen Stankovych and librettist Yuriy Ilyenko based on the life of Olga of Kiev, which was written in 1981 to commemorate the 1500th anniversary of the city of Kyiv.

== History ==
=== Premiere ===
The premiere of the ballet took place at the Taras Shevchenko National Academic Theatre of Opera and Ballet on 19 March 1982 to commemorate the 1500th anniversary of Kyiv. The ballet was produced by the conductor Stefan Turchak, the choreographer Anatoliy Shekera and the designer Fedir Nirod. The plot is based on the historical figure of Olga of Kiev, her personal life, baptism and reign.

=== Performance history ===
In 2010, the ballet was staged at the Dnipropetrovsk Academic Opera and Ballet Theatre. This production was staged by the choreographer Oleg Nikolaev, the conductor Yuriy Porokhovnyk, the designer Daria Bila and the choir leader Valentin Puchkov-Sorochinsky. After seeking permission from Yevhen Stankovych, Porokhovnyk added excerpts from the ballet Vikings to the score. Under Nikolaev's choreography, the ballet consisted of eight episodes, creating a detailed composition of dance symphony and polyphony.

On 12 September 2020 the ballet was performed in Dnipro to commemorate the 1075th anniversary of Anne of Kiev, who was Olga's great-granddaughter.

== Synopsis ==
The first act consists of three dynamic pictures: childhood, youth, and growing up. Olga is shown as a child, a girl, and a young woman. As a child she was almost taken prisoner; as a girl, she meets her future husband; as a young woman, she appears as a bride. It is her marriage, which forms the character of the future princess.

The second act is a story about Olga's reign, the most important moment of which was a trip to Constantinople and the adoption of Orthodox Christianity. The climactic scene is the final apotheosis, in which Olga, Madonna-like on a cross-shaped icon, holds her little grandson Vladimir in her arms.

== Reception ==
The 1981 performance was an "astounding success". After the 2010 performance, the ballet was recognised as being an "outstanding modern ballet".
