= When the Fern Blooms =

Opera by Yevhen Stankovych

When the Fern Blooms (Ukrainian: Коли цвіте папороть) is a folk opera by Ukrainian composer Yevhen Stankovych. It has three acts and was written in the mid-1970s. It was first performed on stage in 2011. The opera was also performed on December 15, 2017, at the Lviv Theatre of Opera and Ballet. The libretto of the opera was primarily inspired by the works of Nikolai Gogol, national traditions and folklore, folk ceremonies, and epic poems.

== History ==
The opera When the Fern Blooms was written on request of the French concert company "Alitepa" for the worldwide exhibition in Paris in 1978. The premiere of the opera in Ukraine was going to be performed at the Palace "Ukraine", and French representatives were invited to visit. However, the premiere of the opera was banned by the Soviet government. During the rehearsals, the Soviet statesman Mikhail Suslov sent a letter from Moscow with orders to prohibit the performance. Decorations and costumes for the production were destroyed.

Despite the overthrow of the Soviet regime in the 1990s and significant public interest in this work, the opera was not performed in full for a long time. Some parts of the opera were performed by the Kyiv Chamber Choir and by the National Folk Choir of Ukraine named after Gregory Veryovka.

The premiere of the opera in a concert performance took place on April 8, 2011 – 33 years after its creation. The concert version was performed by the National Symphony Orchestra of Ukraine and the Folk Choir of Veryovka under the guidance of Volodymyr Sirenko at the National Philharmonic of Ukraine.

The premiere of a fully staged version was held at the Lviv National Opera in December 2017. More than 400 participants were involved in the production. The choir consisted of 80 artists. According to Vasyl Vovkun, this staging of the opera was held in honour of artist Eugene Lysyk, who was the scenographer of the banned production from the 1970s. Now this production has become a constant repertoire of the theatre.

During the 2022 Russian invasion of Ukraine, Nina Matviyenko's performance of Yevhen Stankovych’s opera-ballet When the Fern Blooms, which had originally premiered in 2017, having been described as 'banned' during the Soviet era, and had been live-streamed by the Lviv National Opera, was re-released online.

== Literature ==
- Станкович-Спольська Р. Фольк-опера Є. Станковича «Цвіт папороті» як факт національної історії // Київське музикознавство. Вип. 8. – К.: КДВМУ, 2002. – pp. 180–188.
- Станкович-Спольська Р. Неофольклоризм в опері XX століття і «Цвіт папороті» Є.Станковича // Музика у просторі культури. Науковий вісник НМАУ ім. П. І. Чайковського. Вип. 33. – К.: НМАУ, 2004. – pp. 254–263.
- Станкович-Спольська Р. Фольклорні джерела «Цвіту папороті» Є.Станковича // Київське музикознавство. Вип. 11. – К.: КДВМУ, 2004. – pp. 123–131.
