= Ihor Stefiuk =

Ukrainian artist of decorative arts, teacher (1949–2017)

- Ігор Васильович Стеф'юк
- Born: 14 May 1949; Rozhniv
- Died: December 2017 (aged 68); Lviv
- Education: Lviv State Institute of Applied and Decorative Arts
- Occupations: Artist of decorative arts, teacher

Ihor Stefiuk (Ukrainian: Ігор Васильович Стеф'юк; 14 May 1949 – December 2017) was a Ukrainian artist of decorative arts, teacher, docent. Member of the National Union of Artists of Ukraine (1987).

== Biography ==
Ihor Stefiuk was born on 14 May 1949 in Rozhniv (now Rozhniv Hromada, Kosiv Raion, Ivano-Frankivsk Oblast, Ukraine).

In 1973, he graduated with honors from the Lviv State Institute of Applied and Decorative Arts (teachers Mykhailo Kurylych, Myron Yatsiv, Dmytro Krvavych).

He worked as a lecturer, docent at the Department of Artistic Woodworking at the Lviv National Academy of Arts of Ukraine.

He died in December 2017 in Lviv.

== Creativity ==
He created colored wood sculptures, using elements of traditional Ukrainian folk art, especially the technique of painting icons and sacred polychrome. A personal posthumous exhibition was held in 2022 in Lviv.

The works are kept in the collections of the Borys Voznytskyi Lviv National Art Gallery, the Museum of Ethnography and Art Crafts, the Andrei Sheptytskyi National Museum of Lviv, the National Art Museum of Ukraine in Kyiv; private collections in Poland, Hungary, Germany, Israel, and the United States.

== Bibliography ==
- Яців Р. Ігор Стеф'юк // Альманах 95/96. — Львівська академія мистецтв. — Львів : Брати Сиротинські і К, 1997. — С. 36–37.
- Станкевич М. Українське художнє дерево ХVI—XX ст. — Л., 2002.
- Яців Р. Ігор Стеф'юк // Українське мистецтво XX століття: ідеї, явища, персоналії. — Львів : ІН НАНУ, 2013. — С. 321–325.
- Ігор Стеф'юк: філософ пластичної форми [Текст] = Ihor Stefiuk: philosopher of plastic form : [альбом] / Орест Голубець ; [фот.: Р. Шишак та ін.]. — Львів : Колір ПРО, 2024. — 91 с. — ISBN 978-617-8388-05-8.
