= Rozhniv =

Village in Ivano-Frankivsk Oblast, Ukraine

Rozhniv Рожнів
- Village
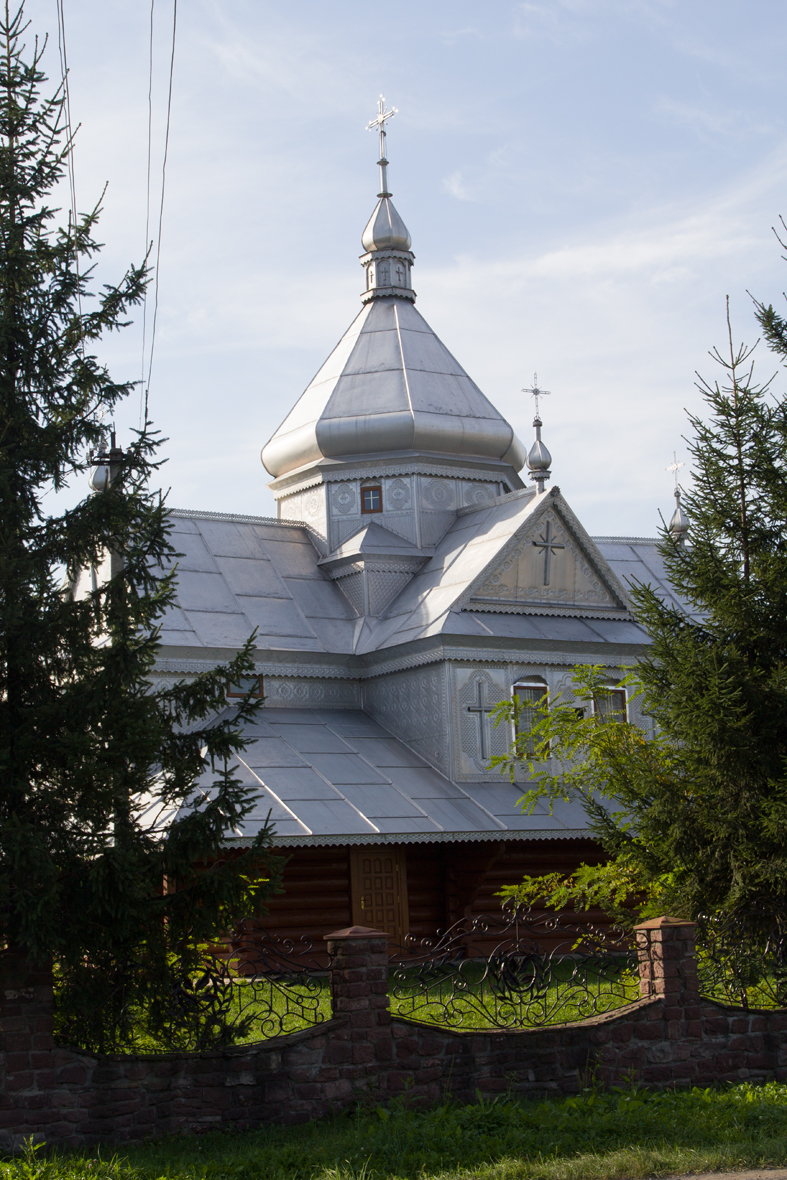
- Saint Michael Church in Rozhniv

- Location of Rozhniv in Ivano-Frankivsk Oblast Location of Rozhniv in Ukraine
- Coordinates: 48°22′00″N 25°13′34″E
- Country: Ukraine
- Oblast: Ivano-Frankivsk Oblast
- Raion: Kosiv Raion
- Established: 1452

Population (2018)
  - Total: 5,563

Rozhniv (Ukrainian: Рожнів; Polish: Rożnów) is a village in Ukraine's western Ivano-Frankivsk Oblast, in Kosiv Raion. It is the administrative centre of the Rozhniv rural hromada.

== History ==
The village of Rozhniv was founded in 1452. From 1867 to 2 July 1924, it was part of Śniatyn County, and from 1924 until 1940, it was part of Kosów County.

On 6 January 1949, two Soviet soldiers (major Sybirtsev and sergeant Bormotov) were captured and executed by the Ukrainian Insurgent Army.

== Notable residents ==
- Herman Bidolakh, Ukrainian Basilian monk and writer
- Ihor Stefiuk, Ukrainian artist of decorative arts, teacher
- Mariia Stefiuk, Ukrainian opera singer
