= Kyiv Opera House =

Opera house in Kyiv, Ukraine

Coordinates: 50°26′48″N 30°30′45″E

Taras Shevchenko National Academic Opera and Ballet Theatre of Ukraine
- Kyiv Opera House
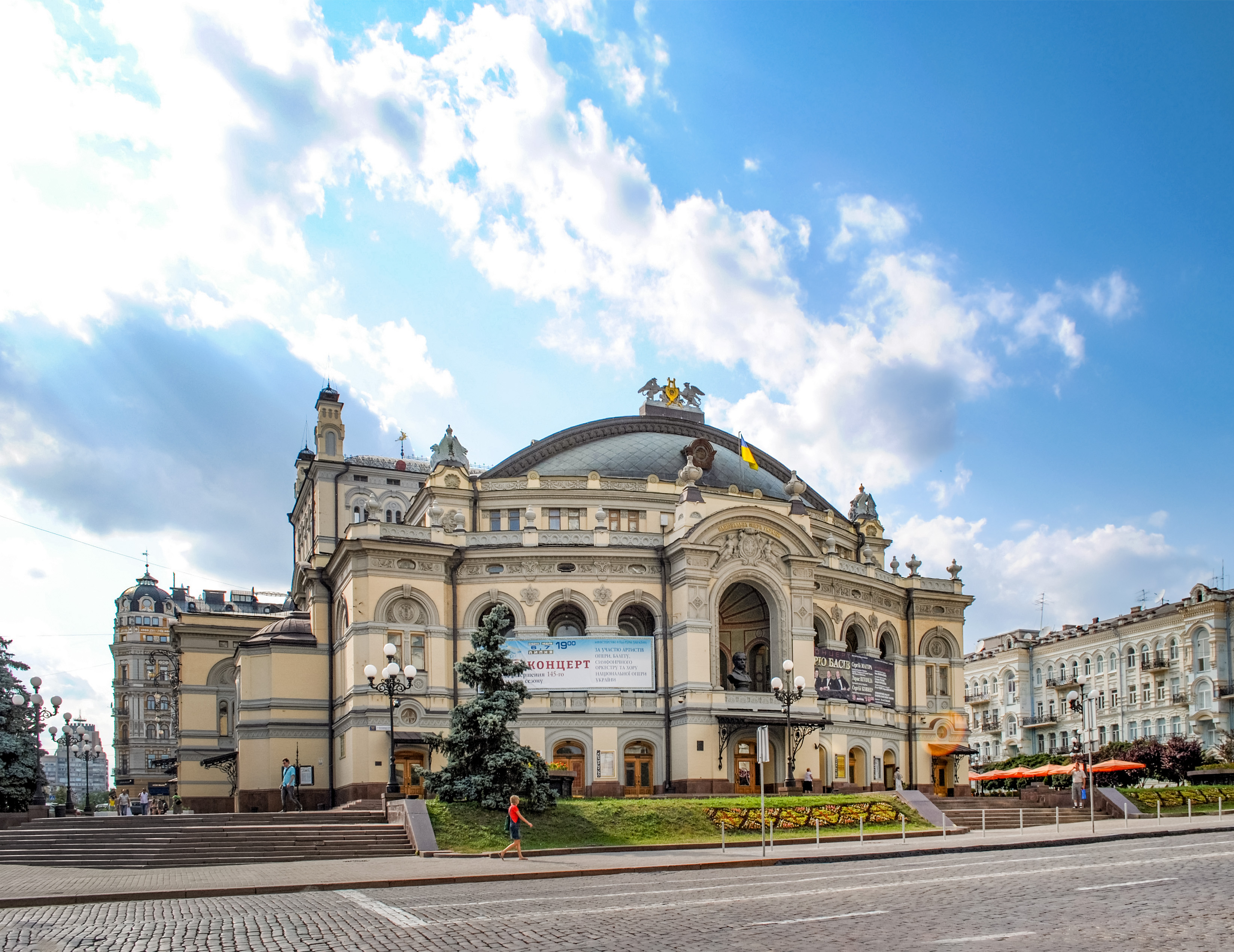
- The opera house in 2013
- Interactive map of Taras Shevchenko National Academic Opera and Ballet Theatre of Ukraine
- Address: Kyiv; Ukraine
- Owner: National Opera of Ukraine
- Capacity: 1,304
- Current use: Opera house, ballet theatre

Construction
- Opened: 16 September 1901; 124 years ago
- Renovated: 1984–1987
- Architect: Victor Schröter

Website
- opera.com.ua

Immovable Monument of Local Significance of Ukraine
- Official name: Театр опери та балету ім. Т.Г. Шевченка (Theatre of Opera and Ballet named after T. H. Shevchenko)
- Type: Architecture, History, Monumental Art
- Reference no.: 17-Кв

Kyiv Opera House, officially the National Academic Opera and Ballet Theatre of Ukraine named after Taras Shevchenko (Ukrainian: Національний академічний театр опери та балету України імені Тараса Шевченка, romanized: Natsionalnyi akademichnyi teatr opery ta baletu Ukrainy imeni Tarasa Shevchenka), is an opera house in Kyiv, Ukraine. It is the home of the National Opera of Ukraine.

The building is located at the junction between Volodymyrska Street and Bohdana Khmelnytskoho Street. Designed by the Russian architect Victor Schröter with an exterior in the Renaissance Revival style, it was opened in 1901, replacing an earlier structure, the City Theatre, that had been established in 1856, but destroyed by fire in 1896.

On 1 September 1911, the Russian Prime Minister Pyotr Stolypin was mortally wounded in the opera house after an assailant shot him during a visit to the opera, and it was where the First Universal of the Ukrainian Central Council on Ukraine's autonomy was proclaimed in June 1917.

== Previous establishments ==
=== Kyiv's first opera theatre ===
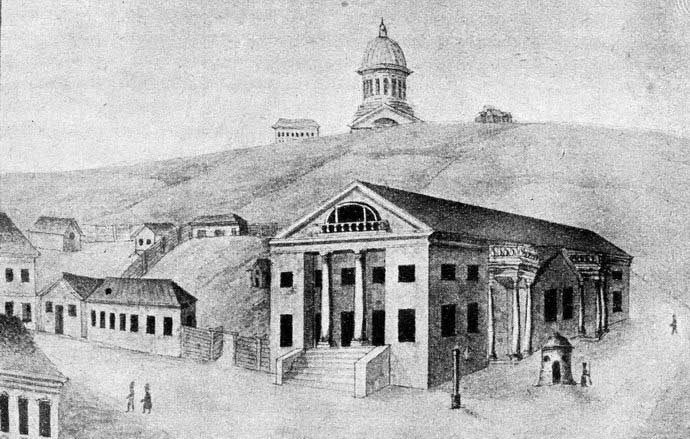
A depiction of Kyiv's earliest theatre by Mykola Zakrevskyi (1829 or earlier)

The first theatre to stage operas in Kyiv was built in c.1804–1806 on Horse Square (Ukrainian: Кінна площа), later known as Teatralnaya, now European Square. Designed by Andrey Melensky, it was a wooden two-storey building, designed in the Empire style, and constructed from wood from demolished buildings originating from the Pecherskyi district of the city. The theatre entrance was decorated with a portico. The theatre had 32 boxes, a gallery, and a parterre that contained space 40 seats and a standing area. It apparently had good acoustics. It quickly became the cultural life of Kyiv.

In the middle of the 19th century, it was decided to demolish the old theatre building on Teatralnaya, as it had become outdated. The final performance occurred on 30 July 1851. Prisoners were brought in to demolish the building. For five years, Kyiv had no permanent theatre. A group of artists founded a small theatre company and rented private premises on Khreshchatyk, and later in a house in Lypky.

=== Second City Theatre ===
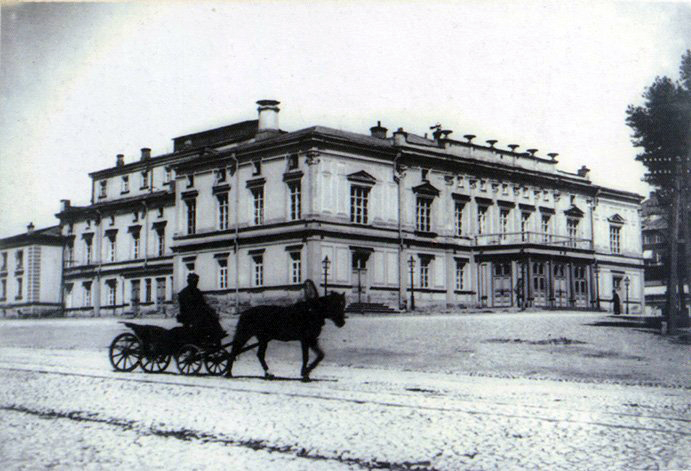
The City Theatre, photographed a decade before its destruction by fire in 1896

The old theatre was eventually replaced by the City Theatre, which was designed by the Russian architect Ivan Strom. The City Theatre opened in 1856, and was until 1863 leased to Russian, Ukrainian, or Polish theatrical companies, before being used by an Italian opera company. The opera house was located at the junction between Volodymyrska Street and Bohdana Khmelnytskoho Street.

The Russian Opera Theatre, the city's first permanent opera company, was formed in the summer of 1867, under the directorship of the singer and entrepreneur Ferdinand Berger The company's first opera was Alexey Verstovsky's Askold's Grave, which was first performed on 6 November 1867 The opera company's most notable director was Josef Setov, who managed the theatre from 1874–1883, and again from 1892–1893). At first, only works by Russian composers, or occasionally operas from the Western European repertoire, were staged. In 1874, the opera house was the venue for the premiere of the first opera written in Ukrainian, Mykola Lysenko's Christmas Night. Other operas staged during this period were Mikhail Glinka's operas A Life for the Tsar, Ruslan and Ludmila, by Alexander Dargomyzhsky, and Die Maccabäer by Anton Rubinstein. The Kyiv premieres of Aleko by Sergei Rachmaninoff (1893) and The Snow Maiden by Nikolai Rimsky-Korsakov (1895) were performed at the opera house, under the direction of the composers.

In February 1896, following a performance of Tchaikovsky's opera Eugene Onegin, a fire started in one of the City Theatre dressing rooms. The fire destroyed the building, along with one of the Russian Empire's largest music libraries and collections of costume and stage props. (Note: The 1896 fire destroyed the music in the theatre, but much was preserved because artists took their scores away. These scores were used to create a new collection that has become the basis of the current library of more than 10,000 items.) Performances were then moved to the Bergogne Theatre, the Solovtsov Theatre, and at the Krutikov Circus.

== Current opera house ==
=== Commission and construction ===
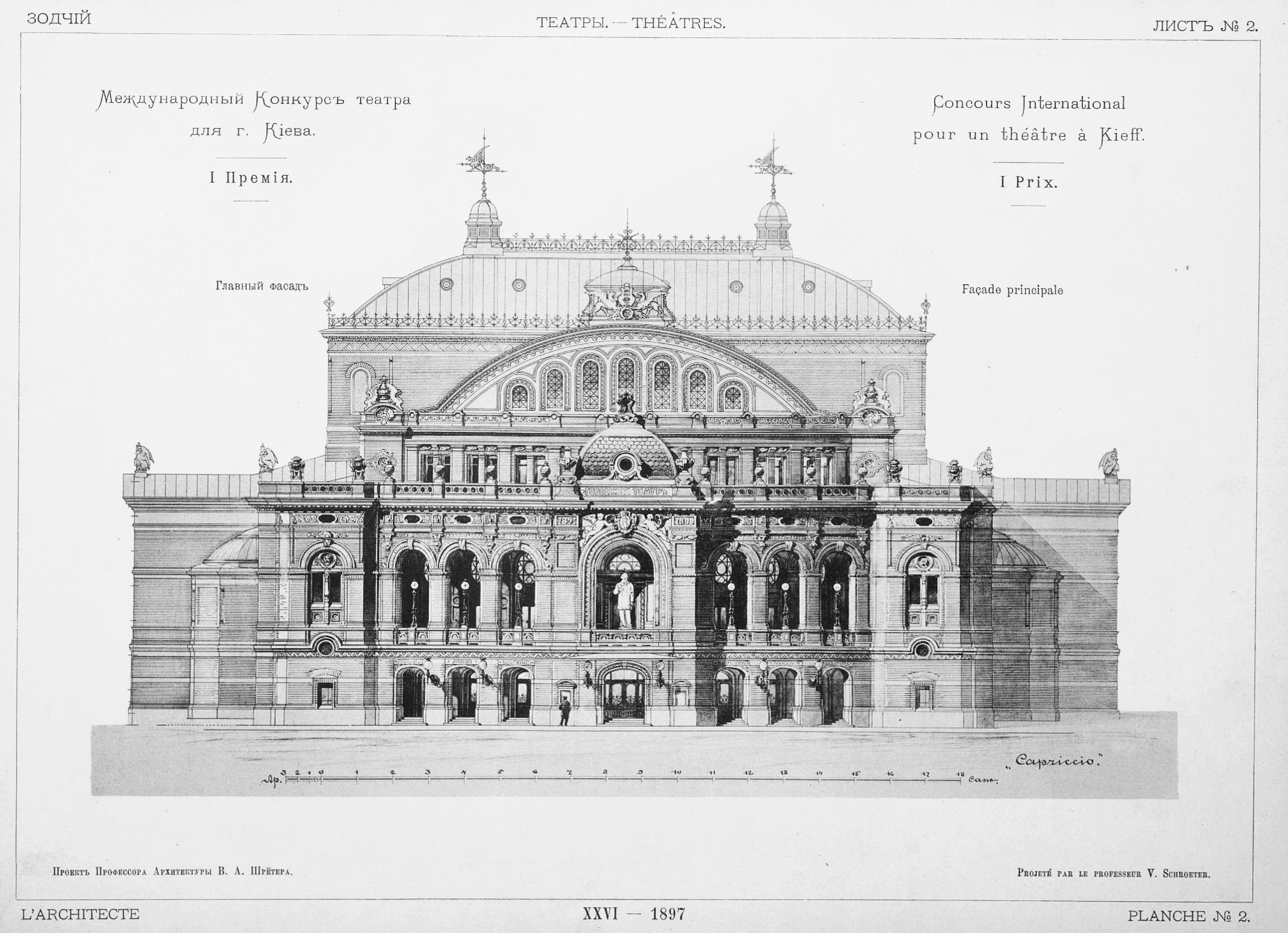
Victor Schröter, design for the Kyiv Opera House (1897)

After the fire, the St. Petersburg Society of Architects announced an international competition to design a new opera house, built in stone. Entries were received from about 30 architects from Ukraine, Russia, Germany, France, and Italy. The winning design, announced in February 1897, was by the Russian architect Victor Schröter, then the chief architect of the Directorate of Imperial Theatres. The project received the approval of the Kyiv City Duma on 24 May 1897.

Schröter produced over 250 design drawings for the new opera house. Construction began in August 1898, initially under the supervision of the city architect, Oleksandr Kryvosheev. In 1899, Kryvosheev was replaced by the Ukrainian architect Vladimir Nikolaev and his assistant Oleksandr Verbytsky. Up to 500 workers and 60 horses were engaged on the project at any one time, which was completed after three years, which included a delay of 12 months.

=== Imperial era and aftermath ===
The opera house was officially opened on September 29 [O.S. September 16] 1901, with a performance of cantata Kyiv, especially composed by the Swedish Wilhelm Harteveld, and a presentation of A Life for the Tsar. Not all the responses to the new opera house were positive. One newspaper referred to the building as "quite unattractive", comparing it to "a giant clumsy tortoise" in the middle of the square. The interior was criticised in an article for its simplicity, whilst at the same time having "moderate exquisiteness". A critic writing in Kievlyanin commented on the interior of the opera house, and the expense incurred in completing the new building: "The auditorium of the new theatre is quite comfortable, but most of the boxes are excessively narrow and uncomfortable. In total, the hall has 11 exits, but, gentlemen, they are impossible to find! And another question—860,000 rubles were spent on the construction of the theatre, which is 360,000 more than planned, why haven't the people of Kyiv been informed of the reasons for such outrageous overspends?" The opera house was one of the first theatres in Europe to operate the equipment with electricity. Another innovation for the time was the use of a safety curtain.

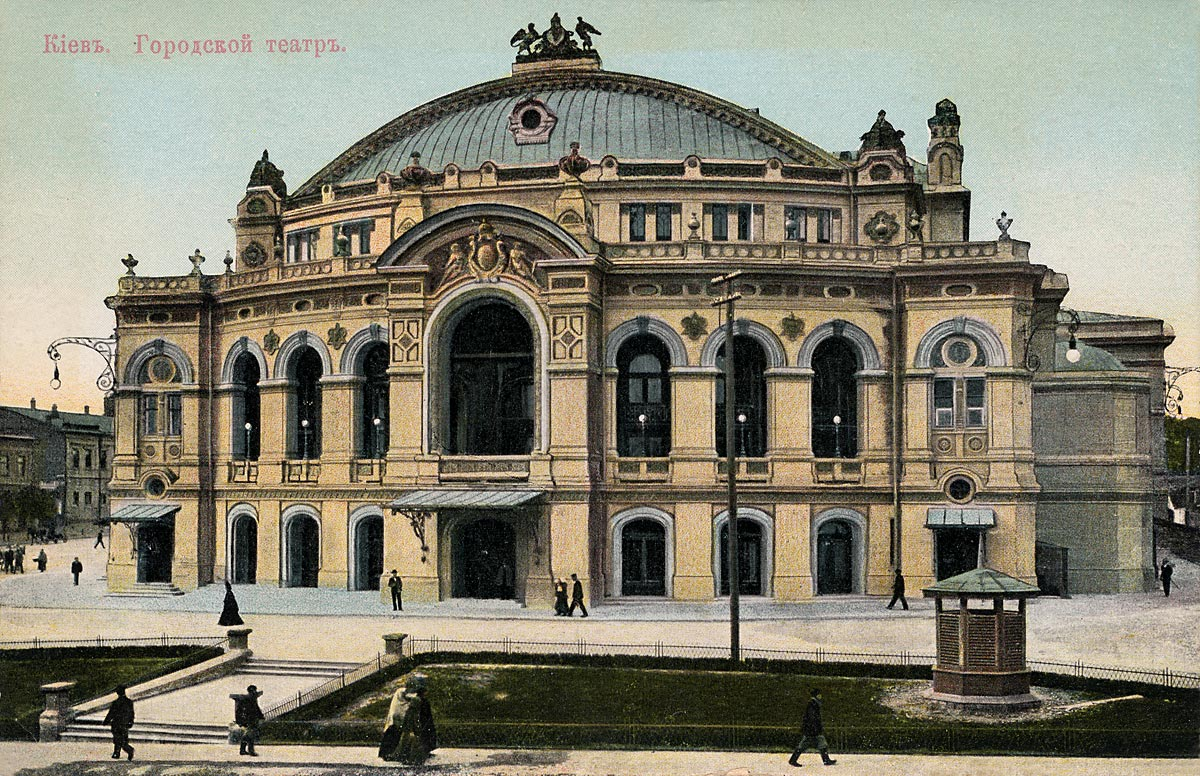
The opera house in the early 1900s

On the day of the opening, prayer were said by the clergy, the opera house was sprinkled with holy water. Guests were then invited on to the stage, and a group photograph was taken. The Kyiv Herald declared: "Today is a day of great celebration for Kyiv music lovers. No matter how much public figures complain about the fact that we have a lack of hospitals, a million-dollar theatre has been built—the music lover triumphs!"

Until 1918, a private Russian opera company rented the opera house from the city authorities.

On 1 September 1911, during a visit to the opera to see a performance given in honour of Tsar Nicholas II's visit to Kyiv, the Prime Minister and Minister of Internal Affairs of the Russian Empire, Pyotr Stolypin, was mortally wounded by an assassin, who fired two bullets at him. He died of his injuries four days later, and was buried on the territory of the Kyiv-Pechersk Lavra.

Between 1893 and 1919, a ballet company directed by Polish choreographers was employed at the theatre. In June 1917, the First Universal of the Ukrainian Central Council on Ukraine's autonomy was proclaimed at the session of the Second All-Ukrainian Congress in the opera house. In 1918, the Hetmanate of Pavlo Skoropadskyi encouraged the opera's repertoire was translated into Ukrainian, and the opera house was renamed the Ukrainian Theatre of Drama and Opera.

=== Soviet era ===
After the Soviets came to power, development of Ukrainian national culture ceased, and there were demands to permanently close the opera house. Despite these demands, the efforts of cultural figures such as the Russian singer Leonid Sobinov meant that the opera company was saved. Between 1919 and 1939, the opera house received a succession of different names:

- the State Opera House named after K. Liebknecht (following nationalized after the establishment of Soviet power, renamed on 15 March 1919);
- the Kyiv State Academic Ukrainian Opera (1926);
- the Academic Opera and Ballet Theatre of the Ukrainian SSR (1934)
- the Kyiv National Academic Theatre of Opera and Ballet named after T.G. Shevchenko (5 March 1939, the 125th anniversary of the poet's birth).

The first Ukrainian ballets, Pan Kanevsky, by Mykhailo Verykivsky (1931), Ferenji, by Borys Yanovsky (1932). During the 1930s, the Soviet government made plans to alter the opera house which to give a more acceptable to the proletariat. The plans were never implemented. When the capital of Ukraine was transferred to Kyiv in 1934, the opera company was reorganised. Soloists from the Kharkiv Opera joined the team, and the choir, orchestra, and ballet corps were enlarged.

On 15 June 1941, the opera house's regular season ended with a performance of Giuseppe Verdi's opera Otello, a week before the start of the German invasion of the USSR on 22 June. Following the invasion, the theatre's employees were evacuated to the Russian cities of Ufa (from 1941) and Irkutsk (1942–1944). They continued to perform their Kyiv repertoire, but also staged new works, such as Verykivsky's opera Naymichka.

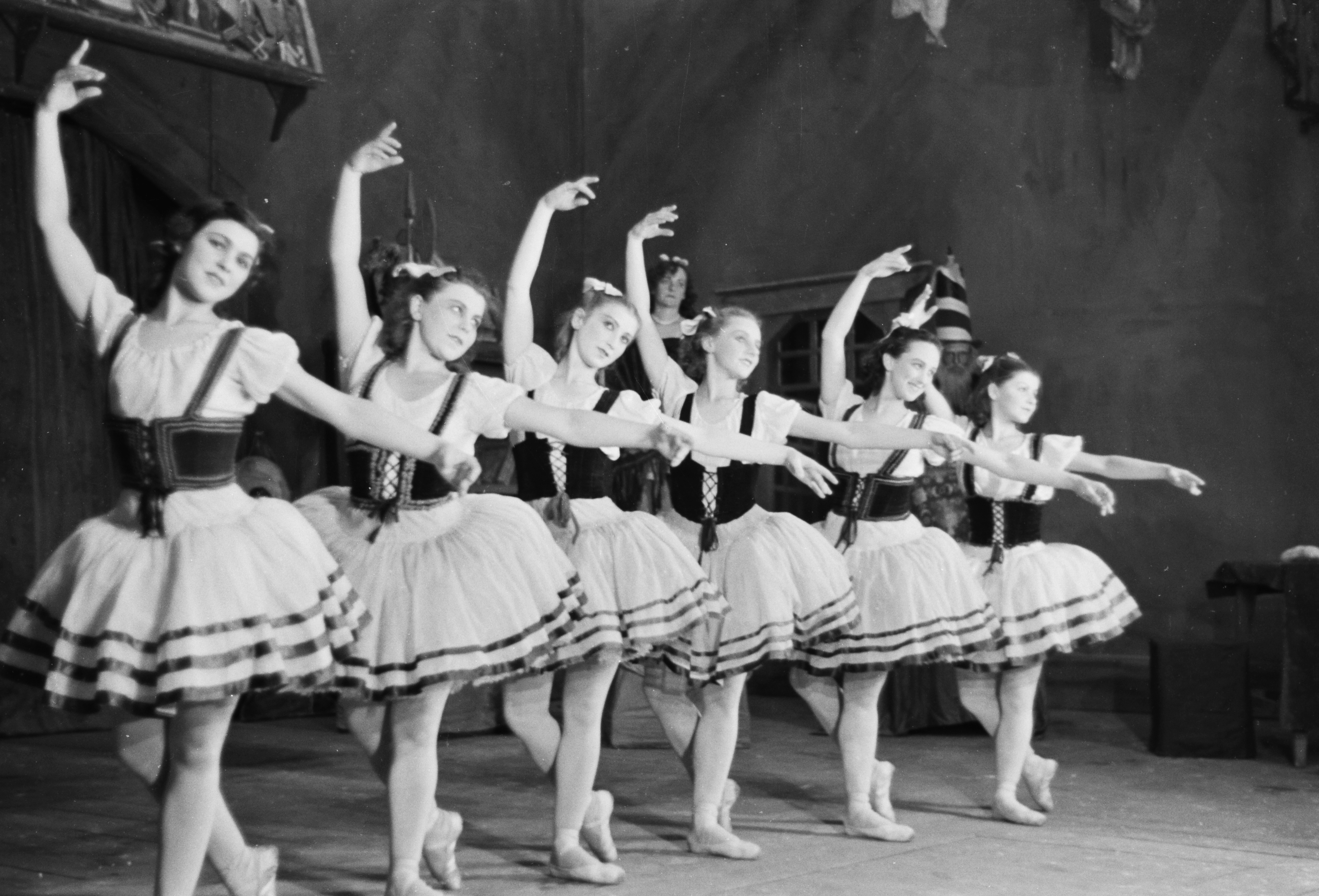
Ballet dancers on the opera house stage in 1942

Resistance fighters in Kyiv planned to blow up the opera house to kill Nazi officers during a theatrical performance, and mined the basement. The Germans demined the basements, and re-opened the opera house, starting with a performance on 27 November 1941. The newly appointed German director replaced Russian works with German operas (sung in German). He permitted the staging of Italian operas sung in Ukrainian, as well as Ukrainian works of the pre-Soviet period. Musicians were incarcerated in the opera house and forced to rehearse day and night in preparation for any new opera. In May 1943, the building was hit by a bomb, which came through both the roof and the floor, killing several German officers. It landed in the sand-filled basement, but didn't explode. During the war, the opera house's props and costumes were looted by the Germans. In 1945, they were discovered by the Soviets near Königsberg, and were returned to Kyiv.

Operas by Ukrainian composers staged during this the Soviet period included Borys Lyatoshynsky's The Golden Ring (staged in 1930), Kostiantyn Dankevych’s Bogdan Khmelnytsky (in 1951), Taras Bulba by Lysenko (in 1955), and Taras Shevchenko by Heorhiy Maiboroda (in 1964).

==== Restoration in the 1980s ====
During the 1980s it became evident that the scenery operating mechanisms were obsolete, and that both the exterior and interior was in need of restoration. Subsidence was discovered, and cracks were found in the foundations, caused by the building being erected on the site of the former ravine.

Between 1984 and 1987, a complete restoration was undertaken by the Dipromisto institute, managed by Borys Zhezherin and Vitaly Yudin, and experts from the UkrNDIproektrestavratsiya Institute. The interior design was retained and enriched. The foyer and the halls were renovated; the oak wardrobes were moved to the ground floor. Rehearsal and dressing rooms were added. The depth of the stage was increased to 20 metres (66 ft) and its height was increased to27 metres (89 ft). The original organ was replaced and the orchestra pit enlarged to enable it to hold 100 instrumentalists. The opera house's internal area was also enlarged, allowing up to 1304 people to attend performances; the standing area in front of the stage was removed. A huge hole was excavated several stories deep in the square outside, in which a new power plant, ventilation machinery, and a wardrobe was installed.

The opera house reopened on 22 March 1988, with a performance of Taras Bulba.

=== Post-independence ===
In 1994, the opera house was renamed as the National Academic Opera and Ballet Theatre of Ukraine named after Taras Shevchenko.

== Architecture ==
At the time of its opening in 1901, the stage of the Kyiv Opera House was the biggest in the Russian Empire, being 34.3 metres (113 ft) wide, 17.2 metres (56 ft) deep, and 22.7 metres (74 ft) high. The ground level parterre could seat 384 people, and in total there were 1650 audience seats. The theatre building had a steam-heating system, and air conditioning.

=== Exterior ===
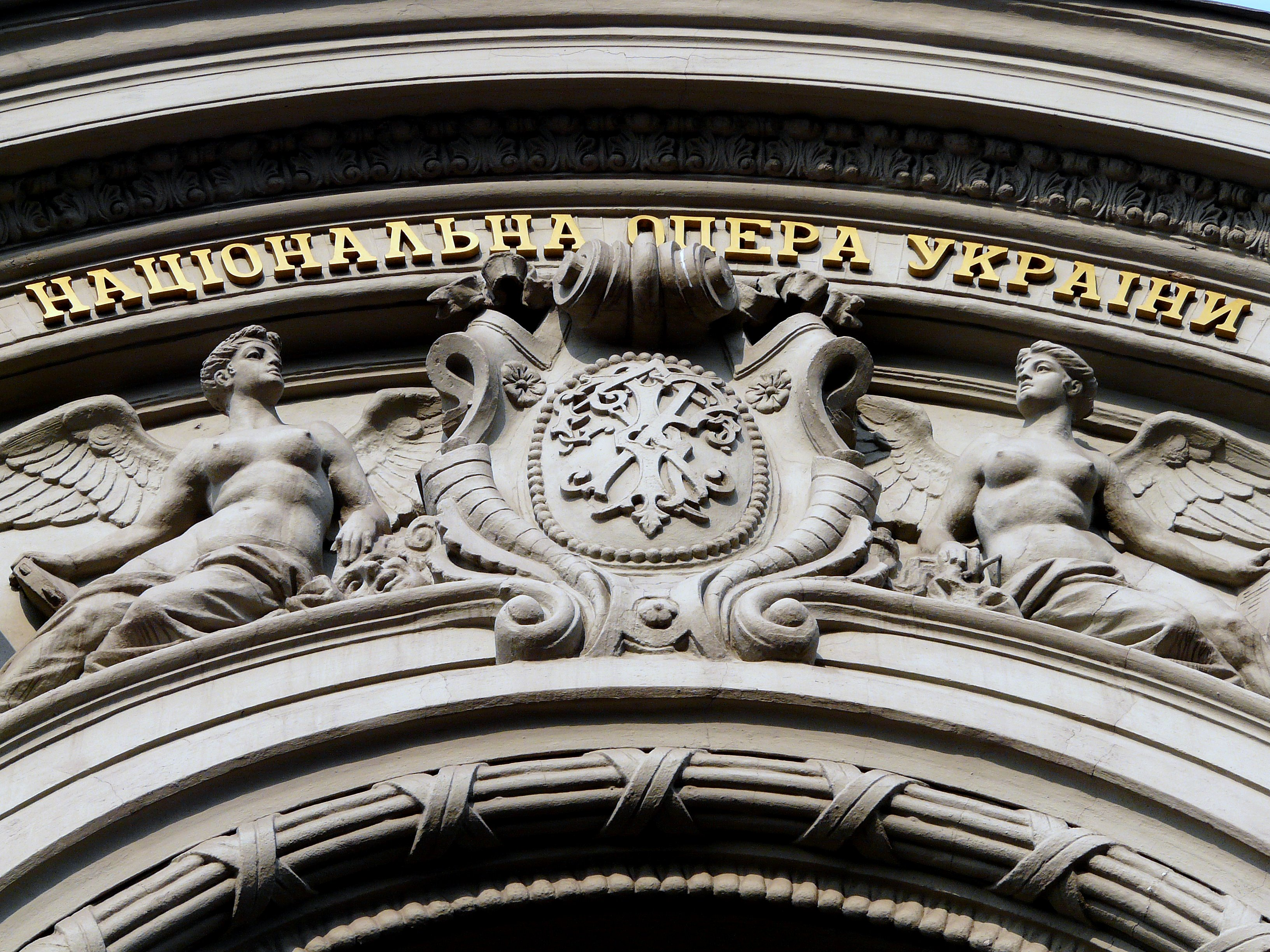
Detail above the opera house's main façade

The exterior of Kyiv Opera House was designed in the Renaissance Revival style. The main part of the building is built with brick, steel and reinforced concrete. The front steps are made of white marble, with other features being built in granite and artificial stone. The interior plaster decorations are painted and gilded. The building's location in Kyiv was carefully chosen to ensure that it fitted within the architectural and natural landscape.

The exterior is decorated with rosettes and masks. The Greek muses Melpomene and Terpsichore, made by the sculptor Emilio Sala, are above the entrance. The building has a curved façade decorated with stucco work and narrow, deep arches. It was planned that Kyiv's coat of arms, along with the city's patron saint, the Archangel Michael would be placed on the roof above the entrance. After protests from the Metropolitan of Kyiv, Theognostus who declared that placing an image the saint would be blasphemy., an allegoric composition consisting of griffins holding a lyre was used instead.

In 1905, busts of Glinka and the Russian composer Alexander Serov were donated by the Directorate of Imperial Theatres in St. Petersburg, and installed on either side of the central arch. These were removed when the opera house was renovated in 1934. (Note: Two life-size sculptures of the composers were sent to Kyiv from St. Petersburg, where they had been originally intended for the Mariinsky Theatre. After the Kyiv authorities refused to use them on the facade of their opera house, the statues passed into the care of the city’s park authorities. At first, the statues were put in Mykolaiv Park, before being moved to Mariinskyi Park, and then discarded. The busts installed in the Kyiv Opera House in 1905 were lost during restoration work on the opera house in 1933.) During the 1988 restoration, a bronze bust of Taras Shevchenko by the sculptor Oleksandr Kovalev was placed in the central arch above the entrance.

=== Interior ===
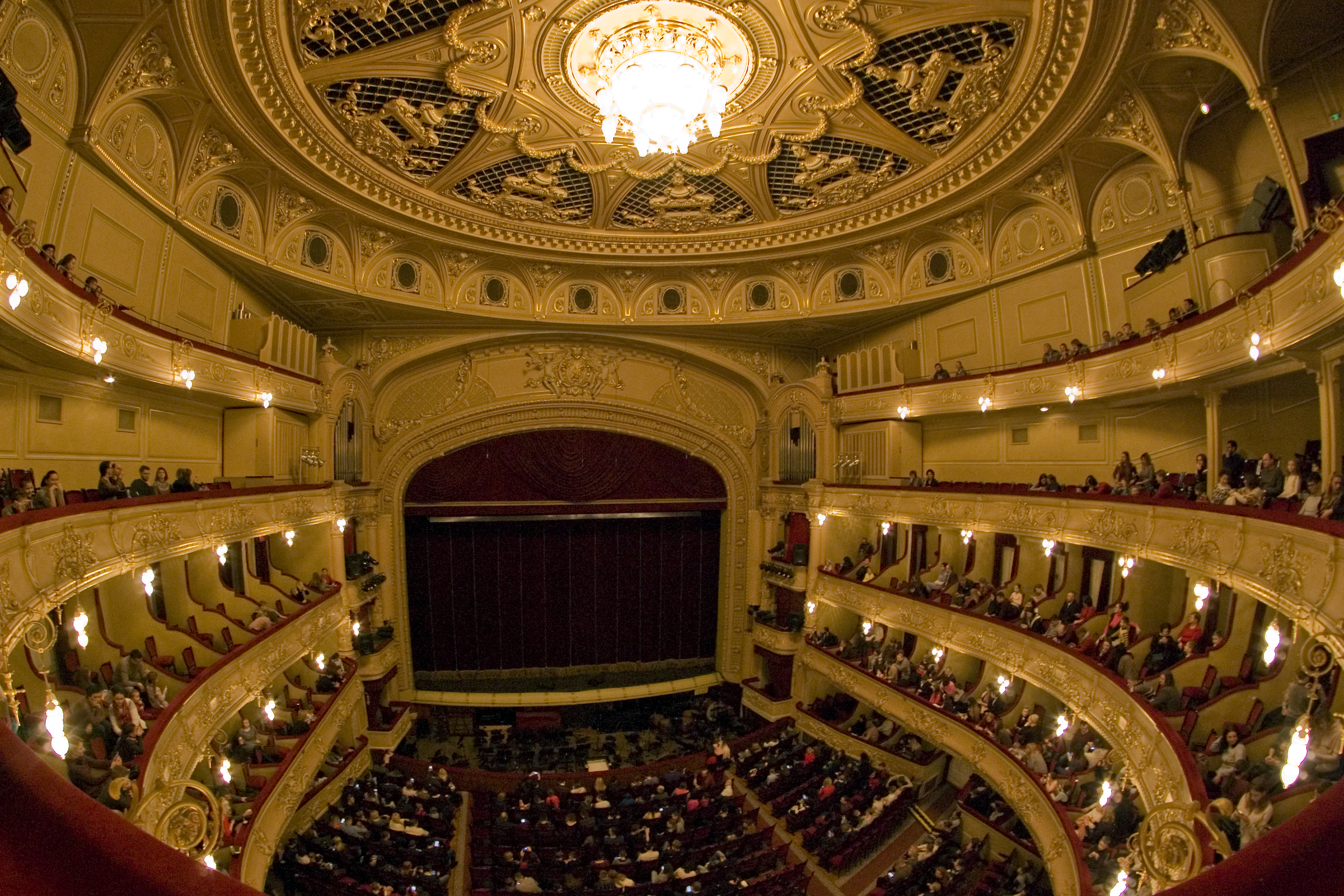
The interior of the opera house, showing the stage curtain, orchestra pit, boxes, and seating

The interior of Kyiv Opera House is notable for its Italian Neoclassical interior design features, such as Venetian mirrors, gilding, stucco work on the walls and ceilings, marble stairways and mosaic floors; velvet armchairs, and subtle lighting.

Soon after the opera house opened, both the artists and the audience praised its acoustics. They were considered to be excellent, in part due to the walls and columns of the auditorium having reeds embedded under the plaster.

The stage of the current theatre has a slope of about 5 degrees downwards, needed to create spatial perspective. Dancers and singers are trained to get used to this by being gradually transferred to rooms with increasingly sloped floors.

== Sources ==
- Ascher, Abraham (2001). P.A. Stolypin: The Search for Stability in Late Imperial Russia. Stanford University Press. ISBN 978-08047-4-547-5.
- Bozhko, M. O. (2017). Храм, де народжуються зірки [The temple where the stars are born] (in Ukrainian). Kyiv: Shevchenkiv Central Library.
- Malakhov, Dmytro; Popovych, Serhiy, eds. (2001). Kyïv: turystychnyĭ putivnyk [Tourist Guide to Kyiv] (in Ukrainian and English). Kyiv; Lviv: Centre d'Europe Publishing House. ISBN 978-96670-2-229-7.
- Nijinska, Bronislava (1992). Bronislava Nijinska-early Memoirs. Duke University Press. ISBN 978-08223-1-295-6.
