= Oksana Dyka =

Ukrainian operatic soprano

Oksana Dyka Оксана Дика
- Born: 16 June 1978 (age 47); Zhytomyr, Ukrainian SSR
- Genres: Verismo, Bel canto, Romantic, Opera
- Occupation: Opera singer (soprano)
- Years active: 2003–present

Oksana Dyka (Ukrainian: Оксана Дика [okˈsɑnɐ ˈdɪkɐ]; born 16 June 1978, in Zhytomyr), also rendered as Dika, is a Ukrainian operatic soprano.

== Career ==
Dyka graduated in 2004 at the Kyiv Conservatory and sang as a soloist at the Kyiv Opera from 2003 until 2007.

She won the 2003 Marseilles International Opera Competition which led to her performance as Tosca at the Opéra national de Montpellier in 2005, a role which she sang again that year at the Estonian National Opera opposite Sergei Leiferkus as Scarpia, at the Dalhalla Opera Festival in Sweden; in 2008 she sang that role at the Teatro dell'Opera di Roma, directed by Franco Zeffirelli and at the Arena di Verona.

Other operatic roles sung by Dyka include Desdemona in Otello at the Estonian National Opera (2005), Elisabetta in Don Carlo at the Teatro Regio in Turin (2006), and Leonora in Il trovatore at the Circuito Lirico Lombardo. She sang the title role in Madama Butterfly at Opera Queensland opposite Jerry Hadley as Pinkerton (2007), the Teatro Comunale di Bologna, the Graz Opera, at the Valencia Opera, Spain, with Lorin Maazel conducting, and in 2010 at the Arena di Verona. Further roles include Marguerite in Faust, Nedda in Pagliacci, Tatyana in Eugene Onegin, Maria in Mazeppa, Abigaille in Nabucco, Amelia in Simon Boccanegra in a concert performance at the Estonian National Opera (2008), the Prima Donna/Ariadne in Ariadne auf Naxos at the Genoa Opera, and Georgetta in Il tabarro at Opera Frankfurt (2009). In 2010, Dyka sang Violetta in La traviata at the Tel Aviv Performing Arts Center.

On the concert stage, Dyka sang with I Musici de Montréal the Symphony No. 14 by Shostakovich in Montreal in 2004. This was such a successful performance that she sang the work again with the Orchestra di Padova e del Veneto in Italy in 2007 and with the Odense Symphony Orchestra in Denmark in the same year. She also sang From Jewish Folk Poetry by Shostakovich. Dyka sang Verdi's Requiem with the Ljubljana Symphony Orchestra (June 2007) and a scenic version at the Tampere Opera in Finland (2008). Dyka sang this work again in 2011, performed by the Jerusalem Symphony Orchestra. Other concert performances include Beethoven's Symphony No. 9 (January 2007, Auditorium di Milano) and Britten's War Requiem (2004, Kyiv). In January 2005 she sang at the inauguration concert for president Viktor Yushchenko.

Dyka's debut role at New York's Metropolitan Opera was in 2014 as Yaroslavna from Borodin's Prince Igor. She shared the title role of Aida with Liudmyla Monastyrska and Tamara Wilson the season after at the same house.

In October 2017, she performed the title role in Zeffirelli's production of Turandot opposite Aleksandrs Antoņenko as Calàf conducted by Carlo Rizzi at the Metropolitan Opera. She was praised for her icy character, penetrating, steady high notes, and the intimidating rendition of the Act II aria "In questa reggia" but also received reviews pointing out the slight weakness in conveying the character swift to vulnerability.
