= Nataliya Oleksandrivna Mykhaylovska =

Nataliya Oleksandrivna Mykhaylovska (born c. 1843 – ?) was a Ukrainian contralto who had active performance career in operas from the late 1860s through the early 1880s.

== Career ==
Born in Kyiv, Nataliya Oleksandrivna Mykhaylovska was trained as an opera singer at the Saint Petersburg Conservatory where she was a student from 1864 through 1867. She made her professional opera debut in the very first performance given by the National Opera of Ukraine (NOU) on October 27, 1867; a staging of Alexey Verstovsky's Askold's Grave. She was a resident leading contralto of the NOU from 1867 to 1871 and again in 1879–1880. During the 1870s and early 1880s she also performed at opera houses in Odesa, Tiflis, Kazan, and Saint Petersburg.

Mykhaylovska's repertoire included Adalgisa in Bellini's Norma, Amneris in Verdi's Aida, Azucena in Il trovatore, Marthe in Gounod's Faust, Nancy in Flotow's Martha, Ratmir in Glinka's Ruslan and Lyudmila, Vanya in A Life for the Tsar, and the title role in Lysenko's Natalka Poltavka.
