= Taras Konoshchenko =

Ukrainian operatic bass

Taras Konoshchenko is a Ukrainian operatic bass. The winner of numerous vocal competitions, Konoshchenko has performed in concerts in Europe, the United States, Canada, and South America.

== Education and early career ==
After studies in piano, choral conducting, and voice at several music conservatories in his homeland, Konoshchenko finished his education at the Munich Music High School and subsequently sang with the Young Artists Program of the Bavarian State Opera in Munich.

In 1994, Konoshchenko had his German debut in Munich's Prinzregententheater as Sarastro in a concert performance of Mozart’s “Die Zauberflöte” under the direction of Sir Colin Davis.

== Recent performances ==
From 1998 to 2003, Konoshchenko was a member of the Bavarian State Opera, where he performed Colline (La bohème), Masetto (Don Giovanni), Il Re (Aida), Lodovico (Otello), Angellotti (Tosca), Nettuno (Il ritorno d'Ulisse in patria), Zuniga (Carmen) and many other roles.

In 2005, Konoshchenko became a member of the National Opera Theater of Mannheim, where he has sung Padre Guardiano (La forza del destino), Leporello (Don Giovanni), Raimondo (Lucia di Lammermoor), Ferrando (Il trovatore), Bartolo (Le nozze di Figaro) and Fiesco (S. Boccanegra).

Since autumn 2008 he has been working as an independent artist.

His successful career has led him to guest appearances at the Ukrainian National Opera in Kyiv, Bregenz Opera Theater, Deutsche Oper Berlin, Volksoper Wien, Théâtre Royal de la Monnaie in Brussels, Anhaltisches Theater in Dessau, Festspielhaus Baden-Baden, the Gran Teatro del Liceo in Barcelona, Staatstheater Stuttgart, and the Opera Theatre of Toulon, Theater Dortmund, Staatstheater Hannover, R. Strauss Festival in Garmisch-Partenkirchen.

He has sung in concert with the Munich Philharmonic Orchestra, the German Symphony Orchestra of Berlin, Bamberg Symphony Orchestra as well as with the Israel Philharmonic Orchestra in Tel Aviv and Haifa, performing under the direction of Wolfgang Sawallisch, Zubin Mehta, James Levine, Kent Nagano, Fabio Luisi and Marcello Viotti.

Taras Konoshchenko has amassed a repertoire of over 80 roles, which includes Zaccaria (Nabucco), Ramfis (Aida), Banquo (Macbeth), Basilio (Il Barbiere di Siviglia), Rodolfo (La sonnambula), Pimen (B. Godunow), Prince Gremin (Eugen Onegin) and Konchak (Prince Igor).

== Sources ==
- Operissimo.com, Konoshchenko, Taras
