= Oksana Stepanyuk =

Ukrainian soprano opera singer

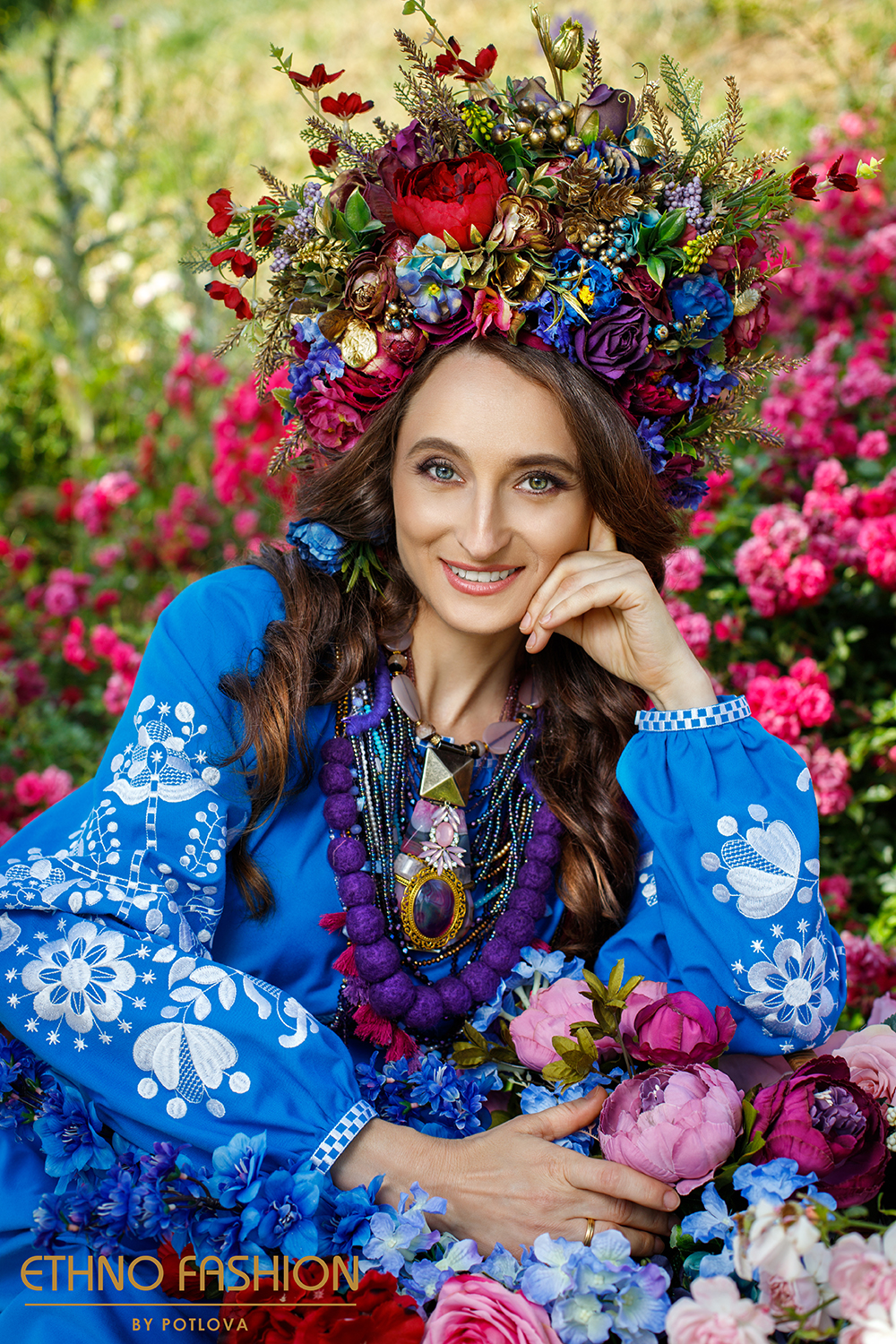
- Oksana Stepanyuk in the project Ethno Fashion by Potlova
- Born: June 16, 1977 (age 49)
- Other name: Ukrainian: Оксана Степанюк
- Citizenship: Ukraine
- Education: Kyiv Conservatory
- Known for: opera singer

Oksana Stepanyuk (June 16, 1977, Ukraine) is a Ukrainian lyric coloratura soprano opera singer at Japan Opera Foundation, Publicity and Goodwill Ambassador, Merited Artist of Ukraine, TOP Beauty World Global (2025,Tokyo), Tourism Ambassador (Tokyo).

== Background ==
Oksana was born in Syniawa, Rokytne Raion, Kyiv Oblast, Ukraine. Her father Anatoliy Stepanyuk is a military pilot, he plays many musical instruments. Her mother Olga Stepanyuk is an accountant.

In 1992, after graduating from the Rokytne Music School (bandura, vocal and piano class) Oksana entered the Zhytomyr Music College from which she graduated in 1996, receiving a diploma as a bandura player with the best practical score.

In 1996, she entered the orchestral department and in 1998 the department of vocal music at the Ukrainian National Academy of Music and continued her music studies with an opera singer Evgeniya Miroshnichenko and bandura player Serhiy Bashtan.

While studying at Music Academy, Oksana made her professional concert tour debut in France, Italy, Chech and Germany.

Oksana made a recording with orchestra and bandura for National Radio Company of Ukraine and made her professional debut as Marfa in The Tsar's Bride by Rimsky-Korsakov.

Among her teachers were Serhiy Bashtan, Evgeniya Miroshnichenko, Margherita Guglielmi.

2020 Appeared on BS TV Tokyo’s Music Crossroads. Since February 2022 she held national wide Ukrainian humanitarian aid concerts. On February 2023 Oksana featured on NHK BS Premium’s Classic club program Winds of Ukraine. On December 2023 performed the Ukrainian national anthem at the National Stadium of Japan.

Since 2010 Oksana has been a member of the Japan Opera Foundation.

During her career in Japan, Oksana has given more than 700 performances all over Japan, including her recitals in Tokyo Metropolitan Theatre, Kioi Hall, Oji Hall, Tokyo Bunka Kaikan Hall, Nikkei Hall, Osaka Izumi Hall, Kamakura Performing Art Center, Matsumoto Kissei Bunka Hall etc.

Oksana has given countless charity concerts for Ukraine, Japan, Cambodia, Sri Lanka, and the Philippines.

== Career in Japan ==
- 2013 – Asian debut as Oscar in Verdi's Un ballo in maschera
- 2014 – debut as Micaela in Bizet's Carmen
- 2015 – performed Oscar in Verdi's opera Un ballo in maschera
- 2016 – made her debut as Violetta Valery in Verdi's La traviata
- 2016 – made her debut as Gilda in Verdi's Rigoletto
- 2017 – started her work at Japan Opera Association
- 2018 – debut as an actress in the drama Yuzuru, title role Tsu
- 2018 – made her debut as Lora in Mascagni's Cavalleria rusticana
- 2020 – sung Verdi's opera La Traviata as Violetta Valery in Tokyo Metropolitan Theatre
- 2021 – debut as Musetta in Puccini's La bohème
- 2021 – debut as Juliet in Bellini's opera I Capuleti e i Montecchi at the Nissay Opera Theatre

== Discography ==
Recordings of performances released on discs:

- 2003 – Ukrainian Nightingale
- 2006 – Peace
- 2011 – Ai Wo Tsumuide – Japanese songs
- 2013 – Ave Maria (Label «Mis»)
- 2013 – Adagio (Label «Mis»)
- 2014 – My Dream (Label «Mis»)
- 2022 – Ukrainian Diva
- 2022 – Single Album Kiyv Birds Song
- 2024 – Amore (opera arias of Bellini and Verdi)
- 2024 – Grazie (opera arias of Donizetti and Puccini)
- 2024 – Brilliant songs
- 2024 – Coloratura soprano
- 2024 – Oksana Plays Bandura
- 2024 – Cinema and musical songs 1
- 2025 – Cinema and musical songs 2
- 2025 – Cinema and musical songs 3
- 2026 – The Ukrainian Nightingale
- 2026 – The Greatest Classic
- 2026 – Japanese songs I
- 2026 – Japanese songs II
- 2026 – Japanese songs III
- 2026 – French Opera Arias

== Awards and honors ==
- 1992 – Laureate of the competition Young talents of Kyiv Oblast, Ukraine
- 1998 – The first prize and laureate of the International Competition for folk instrument musicians, Kharkiv, Ukraine
- 1999 – Laureate of the competition New Name of Ukraine, Kyiv
- 2001 – The first and third prizes at the International Competition Festival, Pskov, Russia
- 2002 – The first prize at the International contest Music World, Fivizzano, Italy
- 2009 – The best new artist at the 42nd Young Musicians Audition, Tokyo, Japan
- 2009 – The second prize at the Bruckcart International Music Competition (first prize no one), Tokyo, Japan
- 2010 – The first prize at the Banri no Choujou International Music Competition, Tokyo, Japan
- 2011 – The first prize at the 22nd Audition, Tokyo, Japan
- 2011 — Merited Artist of Ukraine
- 2011 – The first prize at the Yokohama International Music Competition
- 2013 – The first prize at the Czech Music Competition
- 2014 – Grand Prix and Gold Medal at the FUGA International Music Competition
- 2019 – Second prize at the Margherita Guglielmi Vocal Competition and special prize from prima donna La Scala
- 2019 – Publicity and Goodwill Ambassador
- 2025 – Top Beauty World Global 2025 (1ST RUNNER UP)
- 2025 – Tourism Ambassador in Kokubunji City
