= Evgeniya Miroshnichenko =

Soviet and Ukrainian singer

Hero of Ukraine People's Artist Evgeniya Miroshnichenko Євгенія Мірошниченко

Background information
- Born: 12 June 1931; Radianske, Ukrainian SSR, Soviet Union
- Died: 27 April 2009 (aged 77)
- Genres: opera and chamber
- Instruments: coloratura soprano

Yevheniia Semenivna Miroshnychenko (Ukrainian: Євгенія Семенівна Мірошниченко; 12 June 1931 – 27 April 2009) was a Soviet and Ukrainian opera and chamber singer, internationally famous for her coloratura soprano voice. She was awarded the title of People's Artist of the USSR in 1965.

== Life and career ==
Yevheniia Miroshnychenko was born in Radyanske, a small village in the Vovchansk Raion, Kharkiv Oblast (now called Hrafske and part of Chuhuiv Raion). Prior to the Russian Revolution her mother, Susanna (1903–2001), used to sing for Count Gendrikov's theatre. Her father, Semen (1899–1943), was a mechanic and a driver. Semen was a member of tank crew during World War II and was killed in combat. Due to the war, Miroshnychenko did not finish her primary school education, and in 1943 she became a student of a vocational school in Kharkiv, where she started to sing in a choir. While at school she took an active part in amateur theatre. During an amateur singing show in Moscow in 1951, she was noticed by a professor of the Kyiv Conservatory, who invited her to study at the conservatory under Professor M. Donec-Tessair. Because of her poor progress in non-musical subjects she failed, but was later re-admitted. She completed her studies at the conservatory in 1957 and made her debut in the Kyiv Opera Theatre, as Violetta in Giuseppe Verdi's opera La traviata. In 1961 Miroshnychenko worked in Milan in La Scala under the direction of Elvira de Hidalgo.

Miroshnychenko's voice was unique in its timbre and vocal range. She was called "the singer everyone must see" on account of her vocal technique and her talent for dramatic acting. She was a lead singer of the Kyiv Opera Theater from 1957 to 1998. She took part in international and national competitions, acted in musical films, recorded discs, and gave performances in tours across the United States, Canada and western Europe.

In 1980, Miroshnychenko became a teacher at the Kyiv Conservatory, and in 1990 she became Professor of Vocal Studies there. Many of her students became well-known opera singers in Ukraine and worldwide. Miroshnychenko lived in Kyiv, and was involved with charities and teaching, founding the International Charitable Organizations that helped establish the city's Small Opera Theatre.

== Prizes and honours ==
- International Vocalist contest in Toulouse (1958, the second prize)
- World Youth Festival in Moscow (1957, a silver medalist)
- People's Artist of the USSR
- Shevchenko National Prize of Ukrainian SSR (1972)
- State prize of the USSR (1981)
- Hero of Ukraine (2006)
- Freeman of Kharkiv
- Honorary Award of the President of Ukraine
- Honorary Award of Yaroslav Mudriy (2001)
