= Yevhen Stankovych =

Ukrainian composer

Hero of Ukraine Yevhen Stankovych
- Євген Станкович
- Born: 19 September 1942 (age 83); Szolyva, Hungary
- Education: Lviv Conservatory; Kyiv Conservatory
- Occupation: Composer
- Years active: 1966–2020
- Notable work: Olga, When the Fern Blooms
- Awards: Hero of Ukraine, Shevchenko National Prize
- Website: stankovych.org.ua

Yevhen Fedorovych Stankovych (Ukrainian: Євген Федорович Станкович; born 19 September 1942) is a contemporary Ukrainian composer of stage, orchestral, chamber, and choral works.

== Biography ==
Stankovych was born in Szolyva (today the Ukrainian city of Svaliava), in Hungary.

In 1962, Stankovych studied composition with the Polish composer Adam Soltys at the L'viv Mykola Lysenko Conservatoire. From 1965 to 1970, he studied composition with the Ukrainian composers Borys Lyatoshynsky and Myroslav Skoryk at the Kyiv Conservatory. Since 1988, he has worked as a music editor, and has since 1998 been the professor of composition at the Kyiv Conservatory, now the National Music Academy of Ukraine. From 2004 to 2010, he shared the chair of the National Union of Composers of Ukraine with Skoryk.

In 2012 Stankovych became the patron of Stankovych Music Instrumental competition. In 2017, he chaired the organising committee of the All-Ukrainian Open Music Olympiad "The Voice of The Country".

== Works ==
Stankovych's works include 12 symphonies, five ballets, one opera, instrumental concertos, film scores, and chamber music. He composed a ballet based on the life of Princess Olga. His folk-opera "When the Fern Blooms" was the first modern work its type; it was written in 1970s but was forbidden to be performed by the Soviet authorities. The premiere took place in 2011.

== Awards ==
Awards and honours received by Stankovych for his compositions include:

- Hero of Ukraine (2008)
- Shevchenko National Prize (1977)
- Order of Friendship of Peoples (USSR)
- Medal "For Labour Valour" (USSR)

== Sources ==
- Cherkashina-Gubarenko, M. R. (2016). "Театральні університети Володимира Рожка" [The creative achievements of Volodymyr Rozhko] (PDF). Journal of the National Music Academy of Ukraine Named After P. I. Tchaikovsky. 32 (3): 47–57. ISSN 2414-052X.
