= Hrafske, Kharkiv Oblast =

Village in Kharkiv Oblast, Ukraine

Hrafske Графське
- Interactive map of Hrafske
- Location of Hrafske Hrafske (Ukraine)
- Coordinates: 50°13′25″N 36°51′38″E
- Country: Ukraine
- Oblast: Kharkiv Oblast
- Raion: Chuhuiv Raion
- Hromada: Vovchansk urban hromada
- Elevation: 119 m (390 ft)

Population (2001)
  - Total: 329
- Postal code: 62531
- Area code: +380 5741
- Climate: Cfa

Hrafske (Ukrainian: Графське) is a village in Chuhuiv Raion, Kharkiv Oblast, Ukraine.

Until 18 July 2020, Hrafske was located in Vovchansk Raion. The raion was abolished on that day as part of the administrative reform of Ukraine, which reduced the number of raions of Kharkiv Oblast to seven.

== History ==
In 1928, Hrafske was renamed as Radianske and used that name up to 2016, where the village was renamed back to Hrafske.

During the initial eastern campaign of the 2022 Russian invasion of Ukraine, the village was occupied by Russia during the first days of the conflict. It was retaken by Ukrainian forces later that year during the 2022 Kharkiv counteroffensive. Russian forces began combat operations in the area of Hrafske once again on 10 May 2024 during the 2024 Kharkiv offensive. By 26 February 2026, the village was captured and fully controlled by them.
