= National Opera of Ukraine =

Opera company based in Kyiv

Coordinates: 50°26′48″N 30°30′45″E

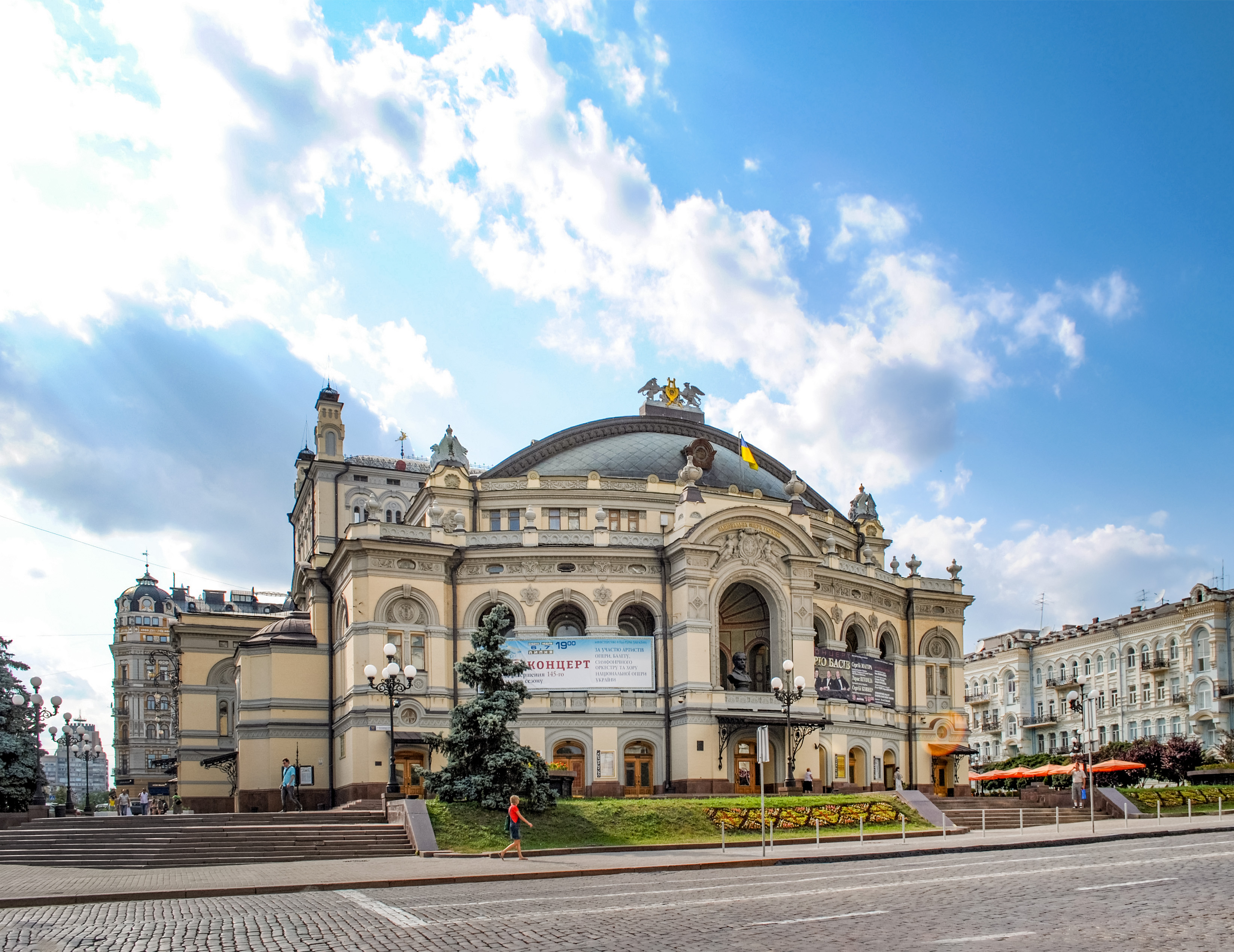
Taras Shevchenko National Academic Opera and Ballet Theatre of Ukraine, home of the National Opera of Ukraine

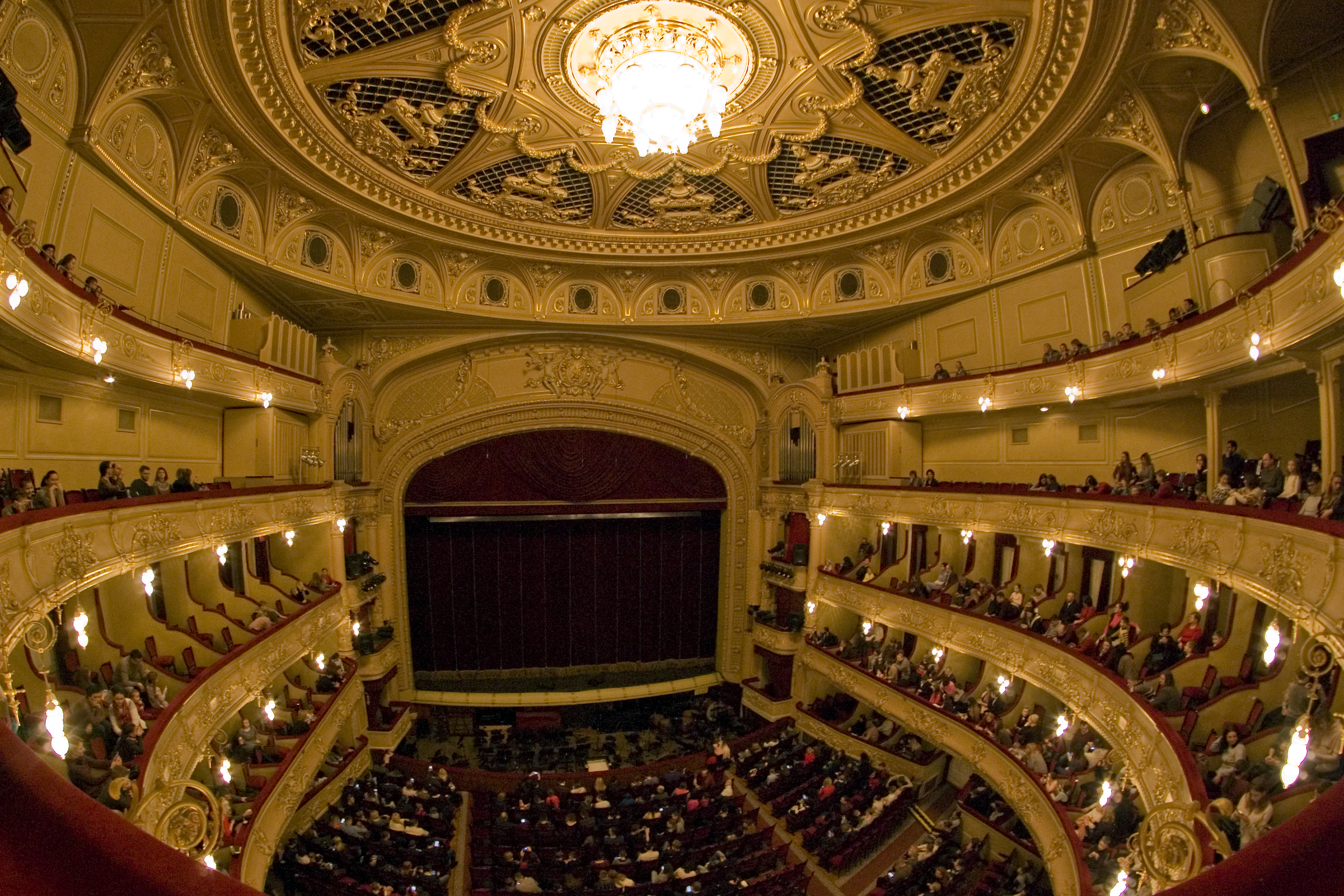
Detail of the interior of the opera house, 2018

The Kyiv Opera group in Ukraine was formally established in the summer of 1867, and is the second oldest opera in Ukraine, after Odesa Opera and before Lviv Opera.

The Kyiv Opera Company perform in the Kyiv Opera House, named after Taras Shevchenko.

== History ==
=== Early history: 1867 – 20th century ===
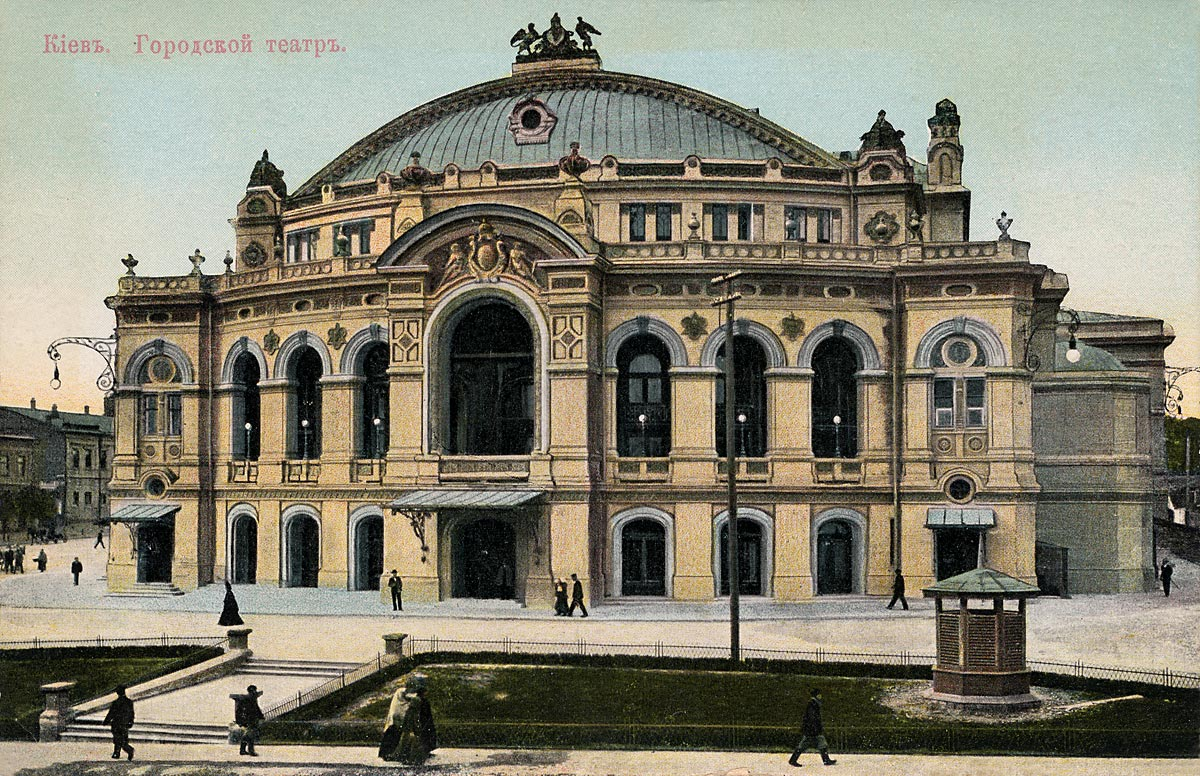
The Kyiv City Theatre in the early 1900s

Established in the summer of 1867 by Ferdinand Berger (? – 1875). Berger succeeded in inviting many talented singers, musicians, and conductors, and the city council (duma) had offered the newly created troupe to use the City Theatre (constructed in 1856, architect I. Shtrom) for their performances. Officially, the theatre was named the City Theatre but was most commonly referred to as the Russian Opera. The day of the first performance, 8 November (27 October old style), 1867 was made a city holiday. The performance of the opera Askold's Tomb by Alexey Verstovsky was the troupe's debut. The cast included contralto Nataliya Oleksandrivna Mykhaylovska. The initial success is attributed to the vocal talents of that time of O. Satagano-Gorchakova, F. L'vov, M. Agramov but also the captivating plot taken from some principal pages of the ancient history of the city.

Early performances were mostly Russian operas, including Ruslan and Ludmila by Mikhail Glinka, Rusalka by Alexander Dargomyzhsky, Maccabees by Anton Rubinstein and The Power of the Fiend by A. Serov, as well as translated European operas including The Barber of Seville by Rossini, The Marriage of Figaro by Mozart, Der Freischütz by Weber, Lucia di Lammermoor by Donizetti, and operas by Giuseppe Verdi, which became the favorite of the Kyivites.

On 4 February 1896, after a morning performance of Eugene Onegin by Tchaikovsky, a fire erupted from an unextinguished candle in the theatre. The fire consumed the whole building within several hours. One of the largest musical libraries in Europe along with numerous costumes and stage props for many performances were lost during the fire. After the fire of the City Theatre, the troupe performed on other stages for several years, including Bergonie's Theatre (now the National Theatre of Russian Drama named after Lesya Ukrainka), Solovtsov's Theatre (now the National Theatre named after Ivan Franko) and even on the arena of the famous Krutikov's Circus.

=== Early 20th century ===
After the fire, the City Council had announced the international competition to design a new building for the Opera Theatre in Kyiv. The winning proposal was by Victor Schröter. The exterior was designed in Neo-Renaissance style and had accounted for the needs of the actors and the spectators. The interior was redesigned in a classical style and called Viennese Modern. However, his greatest achievement is considered to be the stage – one of the largest in Europe designed to the latest engineering standards.

On 29 September [O.S. 16 September] 1901, the solemn opening of the new premise of the theatre took place with a performance of cantata Kyiv by composer Wilhelm Hartweld (1859–1927) and a presentation of the opera Life for the Tsar by M. Glinka.

On 14 September [O.S. 1 September] 1911, there was a performance of Rimsky-Korsakov's The Tale of Tsar Saltan at the Kyiv Opera House in the presence of the Tsar and his two oldest daughters, the Grand Duchesses Olga and Tatiana. The theater was occupied by 90 men posted as interior guards. During the intermission of a performance Prime Minister Pyotr Stolypin was killed. According to Alexander Spiridovich, after the second act "Stolypin was standing in front of the ramp separating the parterre from the orchestra, his back to the stage. On his right were Baron Freedericks and Gen. Suhkomlinov." His personal bodyguard had gone to smoke. Stolypin was shot twice, once in the arm and once in the chest by Dmitry Bogrov, a leftist revolutionary, trying to rehabilitate himself. Bogrov ran to one of the entries and was subsequently caught. "He [Stolypin] turned toward the Imperial Box, then seeing the Tsar who had entered the box, he made a gesture with both hands to tell the Tsar to go back." The orchestra began to play "God Save the Tsar." The doctors hoped Stolypin would recover, but despite never losing consciousness, his condition deteriorated. The next day, the distressed Tsar knelt at Stolypin's hospital bedside and kept repeating the words "Forgive me". Stolypin died three days later.

In the first decade of the 20th century, the Kyiv Opera Theatre attracted the most outstanding Ukrainian and Russian singers, including O. Petlyash, P. Tsecevich, K. Voronets, M. Medvedev, K. Brun, O. Mosin and O. Kamionsky and famous opera stars from the West often came on tours. Several unusual for the time performances took place on the stage: Die Walkure by Wagner, Sadko by Rimsky-Korsakov and Mefistofele by Arrigo Boito.

=== Ukrainian state ===
In 1917, the opera house was used not only for art but also for congresses. In particular, in 1917 the Second All-Ukrainian Military Congress was held in the Opera House well known for the First Universal of the Ukrainian Central Council proclamation.

At the time Ukrainian State, the Kyiv Opera was called the Ukrainian Drama and Opera Theater. Operas were staged in Ukrainian, particularly in 1918 were staged: Faust, La Traviata, Bohemia, Madame Butterfly and others. It was written in Ukrainian press that Ukrainian State Opera has every reason and potential to become one of the best theaters of its time, while warning that "Ukrainian State Opera should not repeat the history of Petrograd state theaters, which gave foreign culture and citizenship culture…" and stressing that it is necessary to "organize the work of the opera artistically strong, national and cultural".

=== Soviet era ===
After Ukraine was annexed by Soviet Union the theater was nationalized and named the K. Liebknecht State Opera House. In 1926 it was renamed the Kiev State Academic Ukrainian Opera, and in 1934, when Kyiv was returned the capital status, the Academic Opera and Ballet Theater of the USSR. In 1936 the theater was awarded Order of Lenin, and in 1939 was named after Taras Shevchenko.

According to the Decree of the People's Commissar of 1926 all the operas were performed in Ukrainian language. This inspired the establishment of the full value of Ukrainian culture and language. The tradition of performing opera in Ukrainian translations succeeded until the early 1990s.

In 1981 the world premiere of a ballet based on the life of Olga of Kiev was performed to commemorate the 1500th anniversary of the city.

=== 1990–present ===
In 1991–1999, the National Opera was headed by Anatoliy Mokrenko. At this time, the theatre is gradually beginning to abandon Ukrainian-language translations, which was explained by economic difficulties and the need for touring activities for artists survival.

From 1992 to 2000, the National Opera of Ukraine was headed by Anatoliy Shekera. In addition to classical performances such as Swan Lake and The Nutcracker by Pyotr Tchaikovsky, Raymonda by Alexander Glazunov, and Coppélia by Leo Delibes, he staged many contemporary works, including Spartacus by Aram Khachaturian, Olga by Yevhen Stankovych, and Legends of Love by Arif Melikov. His production of Romeo and Juliet, staged in 1971, has been on the stage for over 40 years. The performance was shown in many countries and was awarded the UNESCO Medal as the best interpretation of Prokofiev's work.

Since 1999, Petro Chupryna has been the theater's director general (from 2002 to 2011 and since 2018, he has been the theater's artistic director as well). In 2011–2018, the position of artistic director was held by composer Myroslav Skoryk.

The theater has toured in Germany, France, Switzerland, Canada, the United States, Mexico, Denmark, Spain, Italy, Japan, Australia, Greece, Brazil, Estonia, Poland, China, Hungary, Austria, Holland, Belgium, Portugal, Turkey, Oman, and other countries. In 2017, Ukraine celebrated the 150th anniversary of the founding of the Taras Shevchenko National Academic Opera and Ballet Theater in Kyiv.

The opera in 2 acts, Natalka Poltavka, was the last scheduled performance before the 2022 Russian invasion of Ukraine.

== Conductors ==
- 1944–1949 — Samuel Stolerman
- 1952–1954 — Oleksandr Yuriyovych Petrovskyi
- 1954–1960 — Oleksandr Klymov
- 1960–1965; 1970 — Oleg Ryabov
- 1957–1990 — Kostyantyn Eremenko
- 1988–present — Mykola Dyadyura
- 1999–present — Anna Kulbaba , conductor
- 2013–present — Mykola Dyadyura, chief conductor
