= Slava Tutukin =

Ballet dancer and arts manager

- Slava Tutukin in 2026
- Born: 1989 (age 36–37)
- Education: Vaganova Ballet Academy
- Occupations: Former ballet dancer, entrepreneur, arts manager
- Known for: Co-founder and director of WINNDance

Slava Tutukin (also spelled Slava Tütükin; born 1989) is a former ballet dancer, entrepreneur, and arts manager.

A graduate of the Vaganova Ballet Academy in Saint Petersburg, Tutukin began his professional career with the Mikhailovsky Theatre before moving into arts management and artistic leadership in Austria, Germany and Australia. His management career has included positions with Landestheater Linz, Ballet Dortmund, the NRW Junior Ballet and the Tanya Pearson Academy in Sydney. Tutukin is a co-founder and director of WINNDance, a Stuttgart-based dance company for experienced dancers over the age of forty.

== Early life and dance career ==
Tutukin was born in Saint Petersburg in 1989. He initially trained in gymnastics before beginning ballet at the age of eleven and entering the Vaganova Ballet Academy. He graduated from the academy in 2008.

At the age of eighteen, Tutukin joined the Mikhailovsky Theatre in Saint Petersburg as a soloist. His repertoire there included roles in productions of Romeo and Juliet, Le Corsaire, Cipollino, The Nutcracker and La Bayadère.

In 2009, Tutukin received first prize at the International Ballet Competition in Rieti, Italy. From 2010, he continued his performing career in Germany, including engagements with Theater Magdeburg and Aalto Ballet Essen.

== Arts management and education ==
Following his performing career, Tutukin moved into arts administration. After working as company manager at Landestheater Linz, he joined Ballet Dortmund and the NRW Junior Ballet, where he became deputy artistic director and company manager in 2018.

In 2022, Tutukin was appointed managing director of the Tanya Pearson Academy in Sydney, Australia. In the same year, he served as artistic director of the Sydney International Ballet Gala – World Stars of Ballet at the Sydney Coliseum Theatre.

Tutukin has also worked in ballet education and professional development. In 2025, he was part of the artistic leadership of Ballet Collective Australia, a project providing young dancers from across Australia with professional development and performance opportunities. Ballet Collective Australia made its debut at the Sydney Opera House in July 2025 as part of the Sydney Eisteddfod Ballet Gala.

== WINNDance ==
Slava Tutukin and Marijn Rademaker during the curtain call at the WINNDance world premiere in Venice, 2026

In 2026, Tutukin and former Stuttgart Ballet principal dancer Marijn Rademaker founded WINNDance. The Stuttgart-based company was established to create professional performance opportunities for dancers over forty and to explore artistic longevity in dance.

WINNDance made its world-premiere debut at the 2026 Biennale Danza with Scirocco: Death in Venice – Bridge of Sighs at Teatro Malibran on 31 July 2026. Tutukin, Rademaker and dramaturg Ira Goldbecher were credited with the concept of Scirocco. The Death in Venice section featured choreography by Imre and Marne van Opstal, Omar Román de Jesús and Rainer Behr, while Bridge of Sighs was conceived and choreographed by John Neumeier. The premiere ensemble included dancers such as Diana Vishneva, Silvia Azzoni, Mara Galeazzi, Igone de Jongh, Gil Roman and Oleksandr Ryabko.
