= Donetsk Ballet =

Ukrainian ballet company

General information
- Name: Donetsk Ballet
- Previous names: Stalin State Russian Opera and Ballet Theatre, Donetsk State Russian Opera and Ballet Theatre
- Year founded: 1946
- Principal venue: Donetsk State Academic Opera and Ballet Theatre

Artistic staff
- Artistic Director: Vadim Pisarev
- Principal Conductor: Vladimir Lande

Other
- Formation: Principal; First Soloist; Soloist; Corps de Ballet

Donetsk Ballet is a ballet company based in the city of Donetsk, Ukraine. Donetsk Ballet performs works of classical ballet and contemporary dance. The company tours internationally.

== History ==
A ballet company was first established as part of the existing Donetsk Russian Musical Theatre in 1946, joining an opera company already based at the theatre. These were together renamed as the Stalin State Russian Opera and Ballet Theatre. The venue is now called the Donetsk State Academic Opera and Ballet Theatre.

Donetsk Ballet has performed in the United States every year since 1989. Regular international tours also travel to Italy, Spain, Norway, France, China, and Japan.

In one incident that generated much publicity, the Donetsk Ballet troupe was left stranded in Baltimore, Maryland while on tour in 1989, after being dropped by their original tour producers. After a group of different sponsors intervened, the group continued with their tour in the United States, even adding a performance at the Kennedy Center to their schedule.

Ballerina Dame Margot Fonteyn, aware of the troubled company, asked Ken Ludden (director of The Margot Fonteyn Academy of Ballet), to help the company if possible and to express her support. Ludden contacted a number of benefactors and theatrical venues urging them to aid the stranded company. With some concrete ideas resulting, he then met with Sergei Schumakin, (Donetsk director at the time), to discuss a Kennedy Center performance to boost the public awareness of the company. During the meeting, Ludden was introduced to Donetsk star Vadim Pisarev. Later that week Pisarev invited Ludden to travel to Donetsk that Spring to choreograph works for the company, marking the first time an American classical choreographer created new works in the USSR. The trip, a first cultural exchange under the new policies of Glasnost and Perestroika, was co-sponsored by Gosteleradio (the Soviet State media organization), and the major coal mining operation in the Donbas Region of Ukraine. Ludden created "Romantic Etudes" for the company, as well as parts of a proposed larger work "Za Rhythma Djaza"; a solo danced by Vadim Pisarev called "East Saint Louis Toodaloo" and a group piece for the male dancers called "Caravans".

One of the company's best known dancers is Vadim Pisarev, a winner of many international competitions, and the current Artistic Director of the company. Many other prominent Ukrainian dancers have been members of Donetsk Ballet, including Tamara Logunova, Valentin Zemllyanskiy, Nikolay Momot, Galina Kirilina, Stephanie Godino, Inna Dorofeyeva, and Iana Salenko.

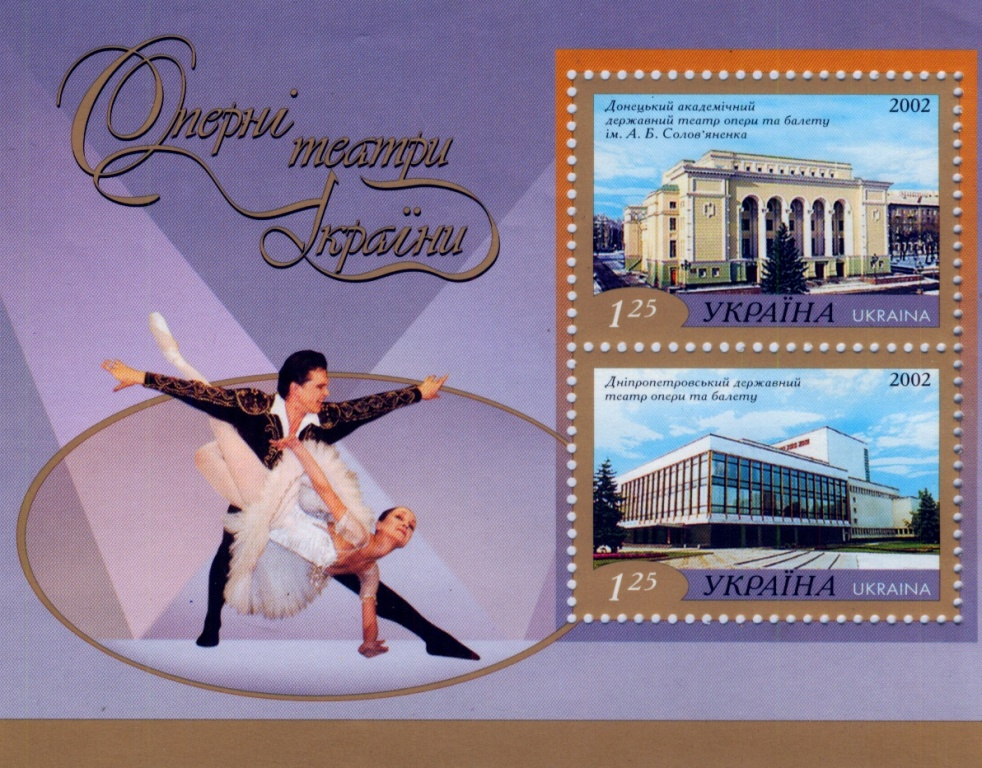
Stamps issued by Ukraine in 2002, depicting the Donetsk State Academic Opera and Ballet Theatre. Shown at the left side are Vadim Pisarev and Inna Dorofeyeva.

== Vadim Pisarev School of Choreography ==
In 1992, the Vadim Pisarev School of Choreography was established at the theatre, providing higher training in the technical aspects of choreography.

== Stars of World Ballet Festival ==
Since 1995, the Donetsk Ballet company has hosted an annual "Stars of World Ballet" festival.

== Repertoire ==
In the decades following its founding, Donetsk Ballet staged dozens of classic ballets, including Swan Lake, The Nutcracker, Giselle, Don Quixote, Samson and Delilah, Walpurgisnacht, Paquita, Peer Gynt, Chopiniana, and Romeo and Juliet. The company also staged divertissements, and evenings of contemporary and classical ballet.

== See also ==
- List of dance companies
- United Ukrainian Ballet Company
