= Hélène Bouchet =

French ballet dancer

- Born: October 2, 1980 (age 44); Cannes, France
- Education: École supérieure de danse de Cannes Rosella Hightower; École Nationale de Danse
- Career
- Current group: Hamburg Ballet
- Former groups: Ballet National de Marseille; English National Ballet

Hélène Bouchet (born 1980) is a French ballet dancer is a principal dancer at the Hamburg Ballet.

== Early life ==
Bouchet was born in Cannes in the south of France. She studied ballet at École supérieure de danse de Cannes Rosella Hightower and at the École Nationale de Danse in Marseille under Raymond Franchetti and Dominique Khalfouni.

== Career ==
After dancing with the Roland Petit's Ballet National de Marseille and English National Ballet, she joined the Hamburg Ballet in 1998. She became a soloist in 2003 and principal dancer in 2005. She had originated a number of roles in John Neumeier's works, including La Barbarina in Death in Venice, Tatiana Larina in Tatiana and Eurydice in Orpheus. She won the Prix Benois de la Danse for the latter.

As a guest artists, she took part in the Tokyo Ballet's 50-year anniversary celebrations, dancing the title role in Romeo and Juliet with Thiago Bordin, and Jewels with the Mariinsky Ballet, as well as in Germany, France, Japan, Luxembourg, U.S., Russia and Argentina. In 2003, wearing a Gypsy dress, Bouchet performed "The Gipsy Tunes" in Mougins, France, with her sister, Diane Bouchet, on violin.

== Selected repertoire ==
- Marguerite Gautier, Manon Lescaut and Olympia in Lady of the Camellias
- Myrtha, Moyna, Zulma and Paesant-Pas de deux in Giselle
- Princess Natalia, Princess Claire and The Butterfly in Illusions - like Swan Lake
- Louise, Marie, The Beautiful Girl from Granada, La Fille du Pharaon and Mrs. Stahlbaum in The Nutcracker
- The good Fairy, A Fairy, Princess Florine and Amors Segen in The Sleeping Beauty
- Hippolyta/Titania und Helena in A Midsummer Night's Dream
- Romola Nijinsky, Tamara Karsavina und Olga Preobrajenska in Nijinsky
- Juliet in Romeo and Juliet
- Aschenbach's Concepts in Death in Venice
- A Stepsister in A Cinderella Story
- The Little Mermaid and Henriette/The Princess in The Little Mermaid
- Desdemona in Othello
- Sylvia in Sylvia
- Julie in Liliom
- Blanche DuBois in A Streetcar Named Desire
- The mother in Christmas Oratorio I-VI
- Woman I in Bernstein Dances
- Dolly in Anna Karenina
- Gamzatti in La Bayadère
- The Sylph in La Sylphide
- Pink and Mauve in Dances at a Gathering
- Tatiana in Onegin
- Third Simphony of Gustav Mahler
- Afternoon of a Faun
- Saint Matthew Passion
- Song of the Earth
- Jewels – Emerald, Rubies and Diamonds
- Tchaikovsky Pas de deux
- Thaïs

=== Created roles ===
- Silvia in Préludes CV
- La Barbarina in Death in Venice
- Eurydice in Orpheus
- Alma in Purgatorio
- Tatiana Larina in Tatiana
- The Servant (Désirée von Wertheimstein) in Duse
- Nocturnes and Nachtwanderung from Songs of the Night
- Verklungene Feste
- Night and Echo
- Unerreichbare Orte
- Wege
- A Foreign Sound
- My Dear Love
- Renku
- Countdown

== Awards ==
- Silver medal, Varna International Ballet Competition, 2002
- Dr. Wilhelm-Oberdörffer-Prize, 2004
- Prix Benois de la Danse, 2010
