= Stanislav Olshanskyi =

Ukrainian ballet dancer

- Станіслав Ольшанський
- Born: February 3, 1994 (age 32); Kremenets, Ukraine
- Education: Kherson State University
- Occupation: Ballet artist
- Years active: 2011–present
- Employer: Miami City Ballet
- Title: Principal Dancer
- Awards: First Prize at the XII International Ballet Competition (2019)

Stanislav Olshanskyi (born February 3, 1994, Kremenets, Ukraine) is a Ukrainian ballet artist, a principal dancer at Miami City Ballet, and former principal dancer of the National Opera of Ukraine (2016–2022).

== Early life and education ==
Stanislav Olshanskyi was born on February 3, 1994, in Kremenets, in a family of Alla and Valeriy Olshanskyi. He developed an interest in dance early in life, influenced by his mother. Along with his older brother Valeriy, he began his dance training with traditional Ukrainian folk dance.

In 2011, Stanislav graduated from Kyiv State Choreographic College, where he received fundamental ballet training. He continued his education at Kherson State University, graduating in 2015 with a degree in choreography.

== Career ==
Stanislav began his professional career at the Solomiya Krushelnytska Lviv State Academic Theatre of Opera and Ballet. At 17, Stanislav performed his first leading role as Escamillo in the ballet "Carmen Suite". At 19, he danced the role of Prince Siegfried in "Swan Lake," and at 21, he took on the role of the Prince in "The Nutcracker."

In 2016, Stanislav joined the National Opera of Ukraine, where he became a principal dancer in 2018. During his tenure at the National Opera of Ukraine, he performed numerous leading roles in both classical and contemporary ballets. His mentor at the theatre was Viktor Yaremenko, one of Ukraine's most distinguished ballet artists and choreographers, who played a significant role in shaping Stanislav as one of the strongest classical ballet dancers of his generation in Ukraine.

In 2019, Stanislav Olshanskyi won the First Prize at the XII International Ballet Competition in Seoul, South Korea. In 2021, he was awarded the Grand Prix at the 1st International Ballet Festival UA held at the National Opera of Ukraine.

In 2022, Stanislav signed a contract with Fame Game to participate in the project Igone, featuring Igone de Jongh, principal dancer of the Dutch National Ballet. At the same year, Olshanskyi participated in the creation of the United Ukrainian Ballet and served as the principal dancer for the company. In the summer of 2023, the National Opera of Ukraine performed the ballet "Don Quixote" at the Palais des Festivals et des Congrès in Cannes, France, with Stanislav Olshanskyi and prima ballerina Natalia Matsak in the leading roles.

Since 2022, Stanislav performs ballets by George Balanchine, Jerome Robbins, and other choreographers at Miami City Ballet. He works under the direction of Lourdes Lopez, who was a principal dancer at New York City Ballet, danced under Balanchine, and led the Balanchine Foundation. In May 2023, he met with Mikhail Baryshnikov after performing in the ballet "Agon". This encounter was a long-held dream for Stanislav. In March 2023, he worked with American choreographer Alonzo King, performing the lead role in his ballet "Following the Subtle Current Upstream."

Olshanskyi toured extensively, performing in countries such as the United States, Germany, the United Kingdom, Switzerland, France, Italy, Luxembourg, Belgium, the Netherlands, Japan, Kazakhstan, Azerbaijan, the UAE, South Korea, North Macedonia, Greece, Poland, Turkey, Brazil, Argentina, Peru, Chile, and Mexico.

Collaboration with Alexei Ratmansky

Stanislav worked with Alexei Ratmansky in the Netherlands, London, and the United States on productions of the ballets Giselle, DSCH, and Swan Lake. Ratmansky's versions of Giselle and Swan Lake are meticulously reconstructed based on detailed archival research. Stanislav performed leading roles in two such Ratmansky productions. Ratmansky's reconstructions are distinguished by their authenticity, numerous mise-en-scènes, and dynamic choreography. Alexei Ratmansky highly praised Stanislav's work:

“Stas is one of the best Ukrainian dancers of his generation”.

Over his career, Stanislav has danced seven different versions of "Swan Lake" and three versions of "Giselle", with Ratmansky's being the latest.

The French ballerina Claude Bessy, the favorite ballerina of Serge Lifar, who danced at the Grand Opera during the time he directed the theater, said during a meeting with Ukrainian ballet artists that Stanislav is dynamic, has excellent technique and possesses outstanding physical attributes.

== Repertoire ==
=== Ballets ===
- Prince in The Nutcracker (productions by V. Vainonen and V. Kovtun)
- Basilio, Espada in Don Quixote (L. Minkus)
- Prince Desire, Bluebird in The Sleeping Beauty (P. Tchaikovsky)
- Solor in La Bayadère (L. Minkus)
- Albrecht, Hans in Giselle (A. Adam)
- Conrad, Ali in Le Corsaire (A. Adam)
- Prince Siegfried, Rothbart in Swan Lake (P. Tchaikovsky)
- Escamillo in Carmen Suite (G. Bizet – R. Shchedrin)
- Golden Slave in Scheherazade (N. Rimsky-Korsakov)
- Abderakhman, Jean de Brienne in Raymonda (A. Glazunov)
- Figaro, Marcellina in The Marriage of Figaro (W.A. Mozart)
- Woland in The Master and Margarita (various composers)
- Julius Caesar in a ballet by A. Rekhviashvili (music by O. Respighi)
- Alexander, Duke de Guise in The Lady of the Camellias (various composers, production by A. Rekhviashvili)
- Dante in a ballet (various composers)
- Prince in Lileya (K. Dankevych)
- Bandit in The Snow Queen (music by P. Tchaikovsky and others, production by A. Rekhviashvili)
- Miller in The Three-Cornered Hat (M. de Falla, production by A. Rekhviashvili)
- Buzgo in Nights in the Gardens of Spain (M. de Falla, production by A. Rekhviashvili)
- Kumen, Prince in Polovtsian Dances (A. Borodin)
- Lucien in Paquita (L. Minkus)
- Romeo, Tybalt in Romeo and Juliet (S. Prokofiev)
- The Seer in Children of the Night (various composers)
- Pergolesi in a ballet by Radu Poklitaru
- Sirtaki in a ballet by Alla Rubina

=== Repertoire at Miami City Ballet ===
- Cavalier in The Nutcracker (Balanchine)
- Pas de Deux in Agon (Balanchine)
- Afternoon of a Faun (Jerome Robbins)
- Concerto DSCH (Ratmansky)
- Man in the Waltz in Serenade (Balanchine)
- Youth in the Ballet in In the Upper Room (Twyla Tharp)
- West Side Story (Jerome Robbins)
- Pas de Deux in Divertimento No. 15 (Balanchine)
- Prince in Swan Lake (Ratmansky)
- Following the Subtle Current Upstream (Alonzo King)
- A Midsummer Night's Dream (Balanchine)
- Sea Change (Jamar Roberts)
- Walpurgisnacht (Balanchine)
