= United Ukrainian Ballet Company =

Ukrainian ballet company

General information
- Name: United Ukrainian Ballet Company
- Year founded: 2022
- Closed: 2024
- Founders: Igone de Jongh
- Founding choreographers: Alexei Ratmansky
- Website: unitedukrainianballet.com

The United Ukrainian Ballet Company, or simply the United Ukrainian Ballet, was a Ukrainian ballet company. Founded in 2022 by Igone de Jongh, the troupe consisted of dancers in exile due to the Russian invasion of Ukraine. The troupe was based in The Hague, the Netherlands.

The company made its debut in August 2022, with a Dutch tour of Giselle, staged by Alexei Ratmansky, followed by appearances in the UK, Singapore, Australia and the United States. In January 2024, the troupe announced it would disband due to financial constraint.

== History ==
In February 2022, when the Russian invasion of Ukraine began, former Dutch National Ballet principal dancer Igone de Jongh was on tour with two Ukrainian dancers. De Jongh then decided to form a company for the exiled dancers, to give them a safe space and opportunities to continue to dance.

De Jongh and her impresario Matthijs Bongertman, who has a theatre management and production company, sought out help from the officials in The Hague and local businesses to establish a ballet company for the exiled Ukrainian dancers. The troupe was offered the Royal Conservatory of The Hague's former building, which was set to be demolished, as its home base. The building was renamed Dutch Center for Ukrainian Dancers. In addition to rehearsal spaces, classrooms were also converted into dorm rooms for the dancers, their families and 200 other Ukrainian refugees. The center was opened on 31 May by Jan van Zanen, the mayor of the Hague, and Maksym Kononenko, the Ukrainian Ambassador to the Netherlands.

The news of the company was spread across the Ukrainian ballet world through social media. The first group of dancers, about fifteen women, arrived in March. Initially, the company only consisted of women, as men of military age were not allowed to leave Ukraine. However, the Ukrainian Ministry of Culture provided temporary permits for male dancers to leave, as the company promotes Ukrainian culture abroad. The company grew to 70 dancers as of October 2022. De Jongh also brought in choreographer Alexei Ratmansky, whom she had worked with, soon after she became aware of his staunch opposition to the invasion. Ratmansky, who has a Ukrainian and Russian background, immediately agreed to work with the company and donated his time.

For its debut, the company decided to perform Giselle, in a new production staged by Ratmansky. Giselle was selected because the dancers were familiar with it, it required a large number of dancers, and it was not a Russian ballet. Ratmansky, who arrived at the Hague in June to rehearse Giselle, adapted from his 2019 reconstruction of Giselle for the Bolshoi Ballet, which used archival documents such as dance notation from the 19th-century. The production used sets and costumes borrowed from the Birmingham Royal Ballet, including a forest backdrop originally made for another ballet, Ashton's The Dream, now used for the second act of Giselle.

On 13 August 2022, the company began tryout performances of Giselle in Alphen aan den Rijn, followed by appearances in Heerlen and Zwolle, before the production officially premiered in Amsterdam on 22 August, then toured to Rotterdam. In September, the troupe performed Giselle in the London Coliseum. The English National Opera provided its orchestra, with Ukrainian Viktor Oliynyk conducting. The troupe was joined by guest dancers who performed the lead roles, including Christine Shevchenko, Alexandr Trusch and Katja Khaniukova, all Ukrainians with positions at other ballet companies, as well as Alina Cojocaru, who is Romanian but was based in Ukraine during her training and early career. The proceeds went to the Disasters Emergency Committee Ukraine Humanitarian Appeal and the United Ukrainian Ballet Foundation.

In October 2022, the troupe performed Swan Lake, staged by Elena Glurjidze and assisted by Sara Knight, in Singapore, Melbourne, Sydney and Adelaide, Australia. In February 2023, the troupe performed Giselle at the Kennedy Center in Washington D.C. Shevchenko returned as a guest artist.

In March 2023, the company embarked on a Dutch tour for the mixed bill Dancing in Defiance, consisted of Wartime Elergy by Ratmansky, Falling Angels by Jiří Kylián, Step Lightly by Paul Lightfoot and Sol León, and Hopak, a Ukrainian folk dance, with choreography by Pavlo Virsky. In December 2023, the company toured the gala programme Ukraine 4 Ever, consisted of excerpts and new creations, in the Netherlands.

In January 2024, the troupe announced it would cease touring and disband due to financial constraints.

== Documentary ==
Front Row, a documentary about the United Ukrainian Ballet directed by Dutch filmmaker Miriam Guttmann, was slated for release in 2024.

== See also ==
- Kyiv Ballet
- Kyiv City Ballet
- Grand Kyiv Ballet
- Donetsk Ballet
- Kyiv Modern-Ballet
