= Johan Kobborg =

Danish ballet dancer, choreographer, director and visual artist

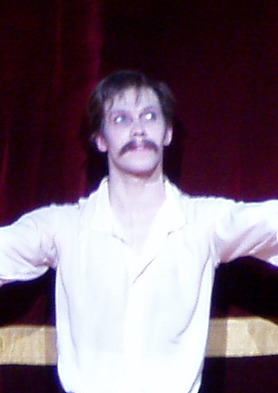
- Kobborg in 2007
- Born: 5 June 1972 (age 54); Odense, Denmark
- Occupation: Ballet dancer
- Spouse: Alina Cojocaru
- Children: 2
- Website: https://www.kobborg.uk/

Johan Kobborg (born 5 June 1972) is a Danish ballet dancer, choreographer, director and visual artist. He is most noted as a ballet dancer, having been a principal dancer with both the Royal Danish Ballet and the Royal Ballet in London, as well as making guest appearances with other ballet companies. Following his departure from the Royal Ballet in 2013, he was the artistic director of the Romanian National Ballet Company until 2016.

== Training ==
Kobborg trained at the Royal Danish Ballet School.

== Professional career ==
After his graduation, Kobborg joined the Royal Danish Ballet and was promoted to the rank of principal dancer in 1994, following his debut in the role of James in La Sylphide. He joined the Royal Ballet in 1999, and has danced most of the leading parts in the repertory — among them, the Prince (The Nutcracker, Cinderella), Siegfried, Romeo, Onegin, Albrecht, Oberon, Rudolf, Des Grieux, Désiré and Prince Florimund. His guests appearances include dancing with the Mariinsky Ballet, Bolshoi Ballet, La Scala Ballet, National Ballet of Canada, Hamburg Ballet, Stuttgart Ballet, Vienna State Opera Ballet and Teatro San Carlo, Naples.

Despite media speculation that Kobborg would retire from the stage to replace Dame Monica Mason as Artistic Director of the Royal Ballet in 2012, it was later announced that Kevin O'Hare would be her successor. Kobborg previously declined an invitation to bid for the directorship of the Royal Danish Ballet, but in an article for the Daily Telegraph he stated that he would definitely accept such invitation to run the Royal Ballet. Following O'Hare's appointment, press speculation about Kobborg's long-term future with the company intensified. In June 2013, he announced that he and Cojocaru would leave The Royal Ballet at the end of 2012/13 season. Their last performance in London was in Mayerling on 5 June, his 41st birthday, followed by scheduled performances on 10 and 12 July with the company in Tokyo.

In December 2013, Kobborg became the Artistic Director of the Romanian Nation Ballet Company in Bucharest, for which he was given a four-year contract. Cojocaru also joined the company as a principal dancer. However, in 2016, actions by new leadership at the Bucharest National Opera House resulted in both Kobborg and Cojocaru resigning, triggering protests by dancers. The new management then apparently banned them from even setting foot in the theatre.

Kobborg's Romeo & Juliet, premiered in the Arena di Verona on 26 August 2019 and attended by more than 10,000 members of the audience from all over the world was considered a great success. Music by Sergei Prokofiev (but shorten to one and half-hour), scenography by David Umemoto and with performers such as Sergei Polunin, Alina Cojocaru, Valentino Zucchetti, Nikolas Gaifullin, the show won overwhelming praises. One critic wrote,

"…… Kobborg has created graceful and appropriate dances for the various gatherings: elegant for the ballroom; impressive in the fight scenes; mournful at the funeral procession. A complementary chorus for the two leading protagonists. The ballet is set in a society without time and place, and this is underlined by the costumes …… Very glamorous fashion show …… Even David Umemotot’s scenery isolates us from any sense of time or geographical setting ……Fifteen minutes of applause and a standing ovation.....".[12]

Another wrote:

"Critics and audience alike were wowed at the sensational world premiere of the ballet in the Arena di Verona ...... Johan Kobborg's version of the world's greatest love story marries classical dance with a contemporary twist to create a dynamic, vibrant and modern re-telling of this ageless drama of all-consuming love, passion, ecstasy and heartbreak. Set to Prokofiev's powerful, exquisite score, and with a striking stage set design by Canadian-based sculptor David Umemoto, the story follows the narrative of Shakespeare's play with the classical ballet vocabulary as its core language."[13]

== Awards ==
Kobborg has also been the recipient of numerous prizes and awards, including the Nureyev International Competition (Grand Prix 1994), USA International Competition, Jackson, USA (Grand Prix 1994) and the Erik Bruhn Competition (1993) and received a 2006 Laurence Olivier Award nomination for his production of La Sylphide.

== On DVD ==
Kobborg's performance as Albrecht in Giselle, alongside Alina Cojocaru as the title role was recorded in 2006 and aired in England on Boxing Day. It was released on DVD the following year.

He choreographed the dance scene in the film The White Crow (2018), a Rudolf Nureyev biopic directed by Ralph Fiennes.

== Personal life ==
Kobborg has two children with his former dance partner, Alina Cojocaru.

== Interviews ==
- Ballet Magazine, Jane Simpson, October 2005 December 2014: Balerinul Johan Kobborg, directorul Baletului Naţional Român, la Adevărul Live
