= Iana Salenko =

Ukrainian-German ballet dancer

- Born: 19 July 1983 (age 43); Kiev, USSR (now Kyiv, Ukraine)
- Citizenship: Ukrainian; German
- Education: Pisarev Ballet School
- Occupation: ballet dancer
- Partner: Marian Walter
- Children: 3
- Career
- Current group: Berlin State Ballet
- Former groups: Donetsk Opera and Ballet Theatre; Kyiv Ballet

Iana Salenko (Ukrainian: Яна Саленко; born 19 July 1983) is a Ukrainian-German ballet dancer. She is a principal dancer at the Berlin State Ballet.

== Early life ==
Salenko was born and raised in Kyiv, USSR. She has five siblings, and her parents worked in a restaurant. She started with gymnastics and folk dancing. When she was 12, her father took her to a ballet school. Though it was a late start, Salenko began to focus on ballet. In 1995, at age 14, she was invited to attend the Vaganova Academy of Russian Ballet in St. Petersburg, but her mother believed it was too far away, so she trained at Vadim Pisarev's school in Donetsk, which is 400 miles away from Kyiv. At age 15, became one of Pisarev's dance partners, and danced at his company, Donetsk Opera and Ballet Theatre. She had an eating disorder, which led to her becoming very weak and injured. Pisarev's sister, who was the director of the school, fed her and took her to therapy, and she soon recovered. She graduated in 2000.

== Career ==
Salenko became a soloist at Donetsk Opera and Ballet Theatre after she graduated. Two years later, in order to be closer to her family, she moved to Kyiv Ballet as a principal dancer. After meeting her future-husband Marian Walter, Salenko auditioned for the Berlin State Ballet, where he was based. She was initially rejected by Vladimir Malakhov, the company's director. Diana Vishneva convinced Malakhov to let Salenko to join the company. She was offered a demi-soloist contract in 2005, and became a soloist the following year.

After dancing the title role in Cinderella, Salenko became a principal dancer in 2007. As a principal, she danced lead roles in many productions including Swan Lake and The Nutcracker. She originated the role of Aurora in Nacho Duato's reconstruction of The Sleeping Beauty. Her frequent partners include Walter and Daniil Simkin.

In 2013, she made her Royal Ballet debut as Don Quixote, partnering Steven McRae. Salenko said was offered a full-time contract at The Royal Ballet, but declined it in order to let her son finish school in Germany, but she became a regular guest, and returned to dance in other productions, such as Tchaikovsky Pas de deux, The Two Pigeons and Giselle.

As a guest artist, Salenko has also performed in galas and companies in Croatia, Russia, Italy, Poland, The Netherlands, Taiwan, Germany, Slovakia and Slovenia.

== Repertoire ==
=== Berlin State Ballet ===
- La Bayadère (Malakhov) - Pas de djambé
- La Bayadère (Ratmansky) - Nikiya
- Cinderella - titular role
- Don Quixote - Kitri
- Le Corsaire
- Giselle - Peasant pas de deux
- Jewels - Rubies Pas de deux, Diamonds Pas de deux
- The Nutcracker (Bart) - Marie
- The Nutcracker (Duato) - Clara
- Onegin - Tatiana, Olga
- Romeo and Juliet - Juliet
- Sleeping Beauty (Duato) - Aurora
- Sleeping Beauty (Malakhov) - Princess Aurora, Princess Florine, Fairy Canari qui chante
- Swan Lake - Odette/Odile
- Sylvia - dance of goats
- Tchaikovsky Pas de Deux

=== The Royal Ballet ===
- Don Quixote - Kitri
- Swan Lake - Odette/Odile
- Romeo and Juliet - Juliet
- The Sleeping Beauty - Princess Aurora
- Tchaikovsky Pas de deux
- The Two Pigeons - Young Girl
- The Nutcracker - Sugar Plum Fairy
- Giselle - Giselle
- ‘Diamonds’ from Jewels

== Awards ==
- 2002 1st Prize and Diaghilew-Price Serge-Lifar-Competition Kyiv
- 2004 1st Prize ÖTR Contest Vienna
- 2004 1st Prize and Makharova-Price at the Arabesque-Competition
- 2004 3rd Prize at the International Ballet Competition in Varna
- 2005 1st Prize at the International Ballet Competition in Helsinki
- 2005 1st Prize at the International Ballet Competition in Nagoya

== Personal life ==
Salenko is married to Marian Walter, also a principal at Berlin State Ballet, whom she met at a competition. They are parents of three children. Salenko is a citizen of both Ukraine and Germany.

== Filmography ==
- The Nutcracker (choreography: Vasily Medvedev and Yuri Burlaka, after Lev Ivanov), Berlin State Ballet, 2014: as Clara, with Marian Walter
- Tschaikovsky Pas de Deux (choreography: George Balanchine), Royal Ballet, 2015, with Steven McRae
- The Sleeping Beauty (choreography: Nacho Duato), Berlin State Ballet, 2015: as Princess Aurora, with Marian Walter
