= Madoka Sugai =

Japanese ballet dancer

Madoka Sugai 菅井円加
- Born: 12 July 1994 (age 32); Atsugi, Kanagawa Prefecture, Japan
- Education: Sasaki Mika Ballet Academy
- Occupation: ballet dancer
- Years active: 2012-present
- Dancing career
- Former groups: Hamburg Ballet

Madoka Sugai (菅井円加, Sugai Madoka, born 1994) is a Japanese ballet dancer who was a principal dancer with the Hamburg Ballet from 2014 to 2025. Now currently a principal with the Boston Ballet, from 2025.

== Early life ==
Sugai was born in Atsugi, Kanagawa Prefecture. She trained at Sasaki Mika Ballet Academy in Yamato, Kanagawa.

== Career ==
In 2012, Sugai won the Prix de Lausanne in Switzerland, for which Miyako Yoshida was a juror. After her victory, she was offered an apprenticeship to The Hamburg Ballet's second company, National Youth Ballet, and joined the main company in 2014. In 2016, she danced a pas de deux from Flower Festival in Genzano with colleague Christopher Evans at the Erik Bruhn Prize. She became a soloist in the following year and principal dancer in 2019. Her repertoire includes works by John Neumeier, Rudolf Nureyev and Jerome Robbins, and she originated a role in Neumeier's Beethoven Project.

In May 2025, Sugai was one of 5 principal dancers who resigned from the Hamburg Ballet in protest at the "toxic working environment" created by its new artistic director Demis Volpi, who took over the role in September 2024.

== Selected repertoire ==
Sugai's repertoire with the Hamburg Ballet includes:

- Cinderella in A Cinderella Story
- Woman in Apricot in Dances at a Gathering
- Kitri/Dulcinea in Don Quixote
- Peasant Pas de deux in Giselle
- Princess Natalia in Illusions – like Swan Lake
- Prudence Duvernoy in Lady of the Camellias
- Hermia in A Midsummer Night's Dream

=== Created roles ===
- Beethoven Project
- Götterboten
- Little Requiem
- Solo for Two
