= Alexandr Trusch =

Ukrainian dancer

Alexandr Trush (Ukrainian: Олександр Труш; born 26 June 1989) is a Ukrainian ballet dancer.

== Biography ==
Alexandr Trush was born in Dnipropetrovsk, Ukraine, and began folk dancing lessons there. At the age of 12 his family moved to Germany and he continued his training at the School of the Hamburg Ballet with Kevin Haigen. He joined the Hamburg Ballet in 2007 and was promoted to soloist in 2010 and principal dancer in 2014.

In May 2025, Trusch was one of five soloists who resigned from the Hamburg Ballet in protest at the "toxic working environment" created by its new artistic director Demis Volpi, who took over the role in September 2024.

== Repertoire ==
Ballets by John Neumeier

- Giselle (after Jean Coralli and Jules Perrot): Albert
- The Nutcracker: Günther, Fritz
- Illusions – like 'Swan Lake' (utilizing choreography by Marius Petipa and Lev Ivanov): Count Alexander
- Nijinsky: Arlequin/Spirit of the Rose, Léonide Massine
- Le Pavillon d’Armide: Vaslav Nijinsky, Vaslav Nijinsky as a Student (first interpreter)
- A Midsummer Night's Dream: Philostrat/Puck, Lysander
- Romeo and Juliet: Romeo
- Othello: Cassio
- As You Like It: Le Beau
- The Lady of the Camellias: Des Grieux, Count N.
- Tatiana: Vladimir Lensky (first interpreter)
- Liliom: Louis, Shy Young Man (first interpreter)
- Death in Venice: Tadzio
- A Streetcar Named Desire: Allan Gray
- Daphnis and Chloe: Daphnis
- Orpheus: Shadow of Hermes (first interpreter)
- The Legend of Joseph: Joseph
- Christmas Oratorio: Angel
- Saint Matthew Passion
- Duse: The Soldier (Luciano Nicastro) (first interpreter)
- The Third Symphony of Gustav Mahler
- The Fourth Symphony of Gustav Mahler
- The Song of the Earth: The Man (first interpreter at the Hamburg Ballet)
- Kinderszenen
- Turangalȋla (world premiere)

Ballets by other choreographers

- La Sylphide (choreography: Pierre Lacotte): Scottish pas de deux
- Napoli (choreography: Lloyd Riggins, after August Bournonville): Gennaro
- Onegin (choreography: John Cranko): Lensky
- The Prodigal Son (choreography: George Balanchine): title role (first interpreter at the Hamburg Ballet)
- Dances at a Gathering (choreography: Jerome Robbins): Man in Brick (first interpreter at the Hamburg Ballet)
- The Concert (choreography: Jerome Robbins): The Shy Boy
- Renku (choreography: Yuka Oishi and Orkan Dann; world premiere)
