= François Klaus =

François Klaus (born in France), is a ballet dancer and choreographer.

He began dancing with the Geneva Ballet in Switzerland, continuing with the Stuttgart Ballet and later the Munich Ballet both under the direction of John Cranko becoming a principal dancer. Francois joined The Hamburg Ballet under the direction of John Neumeier. Francois choreographed on several occasions for members of the Hamburg Ballet and for the Semper Oper Ballet, Dresden. He then accepted an offer from the Bern Theatre in Switzerland to become Artistic Director in 1991. In 1997, Francois was appointed Artistic Director of Queensland Ballet. Francois Klaus remained as Artistic Director and Chief Choreographer at Queensland Ballet until the end of 2012. He choreographed most of the Company's works - combining his extensive ballet and musical knowledge. Klaus introduced Queensland audiences to other Australian and international choreographers, as well as reworking well-known classics. One popular programme, introduced by Klaus, was the studio series "vis-a-vis", in which he presented excerpts from up-coming ballets, which illustrated aspects of ballet that Klaus demonstrated to his audience. Klaus collaborated with musicians, actors, and teachers of other forms of dance. Along with his wife, Robyn White, Artistic Associate of Queensland Ballet, Francois Klaus established Queensland Ballet's "Professional Year" programme, which prepared gifted young dancers (after audition) for life as professional ballet dancers. Klaus showed audiences, not only throughout Queensland, but also in Germany, Switzerland, Japan and Singapore, that he could put his creative mind to classical, contemporary, comic, and children's ballet. At the end of 2008, Klaus staged an ambitious re-working of Swan Lake, into which he'd woven a Russian love story, bringing together over 50 dancers, the Queensland Symphony Orchestra, Queensland-made sets and costumes. In 2011, Queensland Ballet Chair, Joan Sheldon, announced that Francois Klaus had resigned his post, but would stay on until the end of 2013. However, he left at the end of 2012. He was replaced by Li Cunxin in 2012 as Artistic Director, as Li does not choreograph. Francois Klaus and Robyn White currently teach and choreograph as guests in Lausanne, Monte Carlo, Vienna, Singapore, Hannover, and Leipzig.
