= Ida Praetorius =

Danish ballet dancer (born 1993)

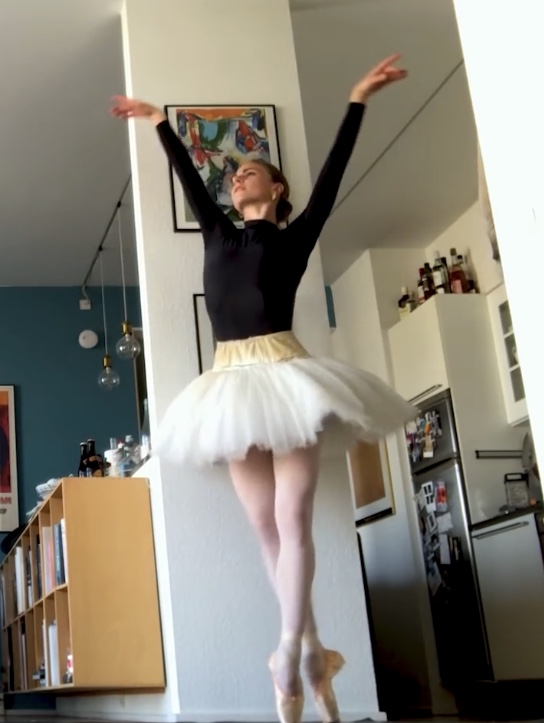
- Ida Praetorius dances for Swans for Relief in May 2020
- Born: 3 September 1993 (age 32); Copenhagen, Denmark
- Occupation: Ballet dancer
- Years active: 2010-present
- Career
- Current group: Hamburg Ballet
- Former groups: Royal Danish Ballet

Ida Praetorius (born 1993) is a Danish ballet dancer. She joined the Royal Danish Ballet in 2010, and was promoted to principal dancer in 2016. In 2021, she joined the Hamburg Ballet as a principal dancer.

== Early life ==
Praetorius was born in Copenhagen. Her mother is a former dancer with the Hamburg Ballet who later became a doctor. Her father is an economist. She has two younger brothers who also dance. She started dancing at age 3 and auditioned the join the Royal Danish Ballet School when she was 8. She trained there from 2002 to 2010. During her training, she had danced with Royal Danish Ballet.

== Career ==
In 2010, Praetorius joined the Royal Danish Ballet as an apprentice at the age of 16. At first, she was cast in little girl roles. However, between age 16 and 18, she grew taller, which forced her to work on her balance. She was promoted to the corps de ballet and soloist in 2014. At age 19, she made her debut as Juliet in John Neumeier's Romeo and Juliet, the same age as Mette-Ida Kirk was in 1974, when she was selected by Neumeier to dance in his first Copenhagen Romeo and Juliet. She was chosen by Thomas Lund to dance with him in The Lesson for his farewell performance.

In April 2016, Praetorius was promoted to principal dancer with the Royal Danish Ballet by the company's artistic director, Nikolaj Hübbe on stage after her performance as Juliet in Neumeier's Romeo and Juliet. She has danced roles such as Odette/Odile in Swan Lake and Marguerite Gautier in The Lady of Camellias.

She has made guest appearances internationally, including Hamburg Ballet, where her mother danced, as well as in U.S. and Canada. Neumeier taught her his Daphnis et Chloé himself. In 2020, Praetorius participated in Misty Copeland's fundraiser, Swans for Relief, by dancing The Swan, in light of the impacts of the 2019-20 coronavirus pandemic on the dance community. The fund will go to participating dancers' companies and other related relief funds.

In 2021, Praetorius went on leave from the Royal Danish Ballet and joined Hamburg Ballet as a principal dancer.

== Awards ==
Praetorius has won the Erik Bruhn Prize for Best Female Dancer for her pas de deux as Eleonore in Bournonville's The Kermesse in Bruges, together with a contemporary piece by choreographer Alessandro Sousa Pereira, danced with her childhood friend and fellow Royal Danish Ballet dancer Andreas Kaas.

Praetorius was nominated for Dancer of the Year for Denmark's Reumert Prize.

In December 2019, she was also made a knight of the Order of the Dannebrog.

== Repertoire ==
- Odette/Odile, Swan Lake
- Marguerite Gautier, The Lady of Camellias
- Juliet, Romeo and Juliet
- Ballerina, Theme and Variations
- Lady Emma, La Bayadere
- The student, The Lesson
- Daphnis et Chloé pas de deux
- Dewdrop, The Nutcracker
- Giselle, Giselle
