= Silvia Azzoni =

Italian ballet dancer

- Born: November 3, 1973 (age 51); Turin, Italy
- Education: Baletna Skola; The School of The Hamburg Ballet
- Years active: 1996–present
- Spouse: Alexandre Riabko
- Career
- Current group: Hamburg Ballet

Silvia Azzoni (born 3 November 1973) is an Italian ballet dancer who performs at the Hamburg Ballet as a principal dancer.

== Early life ==
Azzoni was born in Turin, Italy. She trained at Baletna Skola at her hometown, and later The School of The Hamburg Ballet in Germany.

== Career ==
Azzoni joined the Hamburg Ballet in 1993, and became a soloist in 1996. She was named principal dancer in 2001. She had originated roles in John Neumeier's works, such as Olga Preobrajenska in Nijinsky, Aschenbach's Concepts in Death in Venice and The Angel Christmas Oratorio I-VI. Her repertoire also includes works by Frederick Ashton, George Balanchine, Mats Ek and Christopher Wheeldon. As a guest artist, she had danced in Germany, Russia, Poland, Italy, Japan, U.S., Taiwan, Australia and Austria. She had appeared in Alessandra Ferri's, Roberto Bolle's and Manuel Legris's galas, and performed with The Royal Ballet. Additionally, she held her own gala, Silvia Azzoni & Friends, in Italy.

== Selected repertoire ==
Azzoni repertoire with the Hamburg Ballet includes:

- Hippolyta/Titania and Helena in A Midsummer Night's Dream
- Marguerite Gautier, Manon Lescaut and Prudence in Lady of the Camellias
- Juliet in Romeo and Juliet
- Aurora, The Good Fairy and Princess Florine in The Sleeping Beauty
- Marie, The Chinese Bird and Esmeralda and the Clowns in The Nutcracker
- Cinderella, the Stepmother and a Stepsister in A Cinderella Story
- Odette, Princess Claire and The Queen Mother in Illusions – like Swan Lake
- Giselle, Peasant Pas de deux and Moyna in Giselle
- The Other – Ingrid, The green One, Anitra in Peer Gynt
- Tamara Karsavina and Romola Nijinsky in Nijinsky
- The Little Mermaid in The Little Mermaid
- Sylvia in Sylvia
- Blanche DuBois in A Streetcar Named Desir
- Nikiya in La Bayadère
- Lise in La Fille mal gardée
- The Sylph in La Sylphide
- An Old Woman, 300 years old and The Chosen One in Le Sacre du Printemps
- Blue and Pink in Dances at a Gathering
- The Ballerina in The Concert
- Tatiana in Onegin
- Saint Matthew Passion
- Petrushka-Variations
- Bernstein Dances
- Third Symphony of Gustav Mahler
- Shall we dance?
- Thaïs Pas de deux
- Jewels – Emeralds and Rubies
- Bella Figura
- Afternoon of a Faun

=== Created roles ===
- Olga Preobrajenska in Nijinsky
- Silvia in Préludes CV
- Aschenbach's Concepts in Death in Venice
- The Angel in Christmas Oratorio I-VI
- The Rival (Sarah Bernhardt) in Duse
- Woman in Rennen hinter dem was flieht
- Teresina in Napoli (Lloyd Riggins)
- Time after Time from Images from Bartók
- Messiah
- Winterreise
- Nocturnes from Songs of the Night
- Verklungene Feste
- Pizzicato Polka
- Um Mitternacht
- Unerreichbare Orte
- VIII
- Equilibrio
- Renku
- Ouroboros
- The Episodes of Absence
- Beautiful Soul

== Awards ==
- Dr.-Wilhelm-Oberdörffer-Prize 1996
- Danza & Danza Prize, 2004 – Best Italian Dancer Abroad
- Rolf Mares Prize for the Hamburg Theaters, 2006/2007 – Outstanding Performance
- Prix Benois de la Danse, 2008
- Les Étoiles de Ballet 2000 Dance Award
- Premio Positano, 2013 – Best Italian Female Dancer of the Year
- Premio Roma, 2014

== Personal life ==
Azzoni is married to Alexandre Riabko, also a ballet dancer.
