= Demis Volpi =

Argentine choreographer

- Citizenship: Germanan, Argentinian
- Education: National Ballet School; Instituto Superior de Arte Teatro Colón
- Employer: Stuttgart Ballet (former)

Demis Volpi is a German-Argentinian choreographer. He worked as the artistic director of Ballett am Rhein from 2020 to 2024 and succeeded John Neumeier as the artistic director of Hamburg Ballet from 2024 until 2025.

== History ==
Volpi began studying coreography at the Instituto Superior de Arte Teatro Colón in Argentina, before moving to Toronto's National Ballet School and then Stuttgart's John Cranko School. He became an apprentice at Stuttgart Ballet in 2004 and started directing dances in 2006.

He joined the Ballet am Rhein in 2020 and left the organization in 2024. He later joined Hamburg Ballet in September 2024. In the following year, a number of dancers in the organization stated that Volpi had created a distressing work environment. He left the company in June of 2025.
