= Alexandre Riabko =

Ukrainian ballet dancer

- Олександр Рябко
- Born: 20 February 1978 (age 48); Kyiv, USSR (now Ukraine)
- Education: Kyiv Choreographic School, School of the Hamburg Ballet
- Occupation: Ballet dancer
- Years active: 1996 to present
- Employer: Hamburg Ballet
- Spouse: Silvia Azzoni
- Awards: Prix Benois de la Danse (2016)

Alexandre Riabko (Ukrainian: Олександр Рябко; born 20 February 1978) is a Ukrainian ballet dancer, and a principal dancer of the Hamburg Ballet.

== Biography ==
Alexandre Riabko was born in Kyiv, and trained at the Kyiv Ballet School under Vladimir Denisenko. After reaching the finals of the Prix de Lausanne, he continued his studies at the School of the Hamburg Ballet with Anatoli Nisnevich and Kevin Haigen. He joined the Hamburg Ballet in 1996 and was promoted to soloist in 1999 and principal dancer in 2001. In 2016 he was awarded a special Prix Benois de la Danse for excellence in partnering.

Riabko is married to fellow Hamburg Ballet principal dancer and frequent stage partner Silvia Azzoni, and they are parents of a daughter.

== Repertoire ==
Ballets by John Neumeier

- Giselle (after Jean Coralli and Jules Perrot): Albert, peasant pas de deux (first interpreter)
- The Sleeping Beauty (after Marius Petipa): Prince Désiré, Catalabutte, Bluebird
- The Nutcracker: Drosselmeier, Günther, Fritz
- Illusions – like 'Swan Lake' (utilizing choreography by Marius Petipa and Lev Ivanov): The King, Count Alexander
- Nijinsky: Vaslav Nijinsky, Arlequin/Spirit of the Rose (first interpreter)
- Le Pavillon d’Armide: The Man, Vaslav Nijinsky (first interpreter)
- Purgatorio: creator spiritus (first interpreter)
- A Midsummer Night's Dream: Theseus/Oberon, Philostrat/Puck, Demetrius
- Romeo and Juliet: Mercutio
- Othello: Jago
- As You Like It: Orlando
- VIVALDI or What You Will: Sir Andrew
- Don Juan: title role
- The Lady of the Camellias: Armand Duval, Des Grieux
- The Little Mermaid: Edvard/The Prince, Sea Witch
- Peer Gynt: Flying Aspect, Aggression Aspect
- The Seagull: Konstantin Triplev
- Death in Venice: Aschenbach’s Concept (first interpreter)
- A Cinderella Story: Prince
- Orpheus: title role
- Sylvia: Aminta, Eros/Thyrsis/Orion
- Odyssey: War
- Parzival: title role
- The Saga of King Arthur: Mordred
- The Legend of Joseph: Joseph
- Christmas Oratorio: Angel, Shepherd
- Saint Matthew Passion
- Messiah (world premiere)
- Requiem
- Duse: The Mentor (Arrigo Boito)
- The Third Symphony of Gustav Mahler: The Man
- Preludes CV: Sascha (first interpreter)
- Winterreise (world premiere)
- Seven Haiku of the Moon: Contemplator of the Moon (first interpreter at the Hamburg Ballet)
- Spring and Fall

Ballets by other choreographers

- La Sylphide (choreography: Pierre Lacotte): James
- Napoli (choreography: Lloyd Riggins, after August Bournonville): Gennaro (first interpreter at the Hamburg Ballet)
- La Bayadère (choreography: Natalia Makarova, after Marius Petipa): Solor
- La Fille mal gardée (choreography: Frederick Ashton): Colas (first interpreter at the Hamburg Ballet)
- Onegin (choreography: John Cranko): title role (first interpreter at the Hamburg Ballet)
- The Prodigal Son (choreography: George Balanchine): title role
- Light Beings (choreography: Mats Ek): The Knight
- Thaïs pas de deux (choreography: Frederick Ashton)
- Jewels (choreography: George Balanchine): Emeralds, Rubies (first interpreter at the Hamburg Ballet)
- Dances at a Gathering (choreography: Jerome Robbins): Man in Brown
- Forgotten Land (choreography: Jiří Kylián)
- Bella Figura (choreography: Jiří Kylián)
- Remanso (choreography: Nacho Duato)
- Polyphonia (choreography: Christopher Wheeldon; Hamburg Ballet premiere)
- Trio (choreography: Sidi Larbi Cherkaoui)

== Filmography ==
- Illusions – like 'Swan Lake' (choreography: John Neumeier), Hamburg Ballet, 2001: as Count Alexander
- Death in Venice (choreography: John Neumeier), Hamburg Ballet, 2004: as Aschenbach’s Concept
- Saint Matthew Passion (choreography: John Neumeier), Hamburg Ballet, 2005
- 'Pizzicato Polka' (choreography: John Neumeier), Vienna New Year's Concert, 2006
- Nijinsky (choreography: John Neumeier), Hamburg Ballet, 2017: as Nijinsky
