= Inna Dorofeieva =

Ukrainian ballerina (b. 1965)

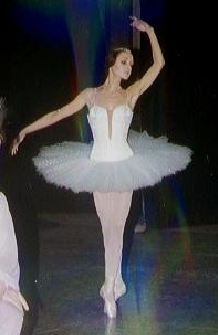
before 2000

Inna Borysivna Dorofeieva (Ukrainian: І́нна Бори́сівна Дорофе́єва; born, June 7, 1965) is a Ukrainian ballet dancer. She was awarded the People's Artist of Ukraine in 1997.

== Biography ==
Inna Borysivna Dorofeieva was born June 7, 1965, in Chuhuiv, Kharkiv Oblast. In 1979, Dorofeieva graduated from Kharkiv Choreographic School (teacher Natalia Zadesenets). In 1983, she graduated from the Kyiv State Choreographic School (teacher Varvara May, who was a student of Agrippina Vaganova). Dorofeieva worked at the Donetsk State Academic Opera and Ballet Theatre. In 1993–95, she was the leading soloist of the ballet of the German Opera on the Rhine, Düsseldorf. In the United States, she worked under the direction of choreographer Vladimir Shumeikin. In 2001, she graduated from Kyiv National University of Culture and Arts. In Donetsk, together with her husband Vadym Pysarev, she created a choreographic school and the "World Ballet Stars festival". In 2014, she moved to Kharkiv, where she first worked at the Kharkiv Choreographic School, and in October of the same year, she accepted an invitation from the management of the Lysenko Kharkiv Opera and Ballet Theater to become its choreographer-tutor. Since 2016, Dorofeieva has been the artistic director of the ballet of the Kharkiv National Academic Opera and Ballet Theater named after Mykola Lysenko.

Dorofeieva is married with three children. Her husband is Vadym Pysarev. Their eldest son, Andrey, also a ballet dancer, recently won a gold medal at the XI International Ballet Competition in Moscow.

== Awards and honours ==
- 1984 - Laureate of the 1st Republican Competition of Ballet Artists
- 1990 - Laureate of the International Ballet Competition (Jackson, Mississippi, USA)
- 1997 - People's Artist of Ukraine
- 2003 - Honorary Diploma of the Cabinet of Ministers of Ukraine
- 2007 - Order of Princess Olga III degree
- 2008 - Order of Princess Olga II degree
