= Hamburg Ballet =

German ballet company

General information
- Local name: Hamburg Ballett
- Year founded: 1973
- Founders: John Neumeier
- Principal venue: Ballettzentrum Hamburg; Caspar-Voght-Straße 54, 20535 Hamburg, Germany
- Website: www.hamburgballett.de

Senior staff
- Director: John Neumeier

Other
- Orchestra: Hamburg State Opera
- Official school: Ballettschule des Hamburg Ballett
- Formation: Principal; Soloist; Corps de Ballet

The Hamburg Ballet is a ballet company based in Hamburg, Germany. Since 1973, it has been directed by the American dancer and choreographer John Neumeier. In addition there is a ballet school, School of the Hamburg Ballet, established in 1978. The performances of the Hamburg Ballet are usually held at the Hamburg State Opera, while the training and education facility is the Ballettzentrum Hamburg – John Neumeier.

== History ==
On August 16, 1973, John Neumeier took over as ballet Director and Chief Choreographer of the ballet department of the Hamburg State Opera. At that time the dancers worked at the opera the whole time, as the opera house included the stage and the ballet studios.

The first performance of the company under the new leadership was a Ballet Workshop ("Ballett-Werkstatt") titled "Classical Technique in Modern Choreographies" on September 9, 1973. Later the Ballet Workshops developed into a hallmark of The Hamburg Ballet. On September 30, 1973, the dancers presented their first program with Divertimento No. 15, Allegro Brillante, Désir and Jeu de cartes. In January, 1974 The Hamburg Ballet had its first premiere: Romeo and Juliet originally choreographed by John Neumeier for the Frankfurt Ballet in 1971. Neumeier danced Romeo, and Marianne Kruuse was Juliet. For the 40th anniversary, this ballet to Sergei Prokofiev's score was revived on April 11, 2013. On May 12, 1974 the first world premiere of a ballet by John Neumeier took place in Hamburg. The ballet, Meyerbeer – Schumann, tells the story of the composers Giacomo Meyerbeer and Robert Schumann. The lead roles were danced by Max Midinet (Meyerbeer) and François Klaus (Schumann).

In 1974 the Hamburg Ballet was invited to perform abroad for the first time. Since then touring is part of every season of the Hamburg Ballet. Over the last 40 years the company has travelled to 29 countries and 4 continents – including France, Russia, China and Brazil.

From June 14–22, 1975 the first Hamburg Ballet Days ("Hamburger Ballett-Tage") took place. Together with the "Nijinsky Gala", which concludes the Ballet Days, they became a tradition. On January 1, 1978 John Neumeier founded the School of The Hamburg Ballet. Originally, the students trained at the Hamburg State Opera. Later the school moved to the Bierpalast and on September 23, 1989 the Ballettzentrum Hamburg – John Neumeier opened. The Ballet Center is the home of the company, the school and the National Youth Ballet ("Bundesjugendballett"), which was founded by John Neumeier in 2011.

In May 2025, 11 soloists resigned from the Hamburg Ballet in protest at the "toxic working environment" created by its new artistic director Demis Volpi, who took over the role in September 2024. On 10 June 2025, Volpi's contract was terminated.

== Repertoire ==
Over the last 40 years, The Hamburg Ballet has developed a broad repertoire, which includes over one hundred and twenty of John Neumeier's choreographies. The main interest of the Director and Chief Choreographer of The Hamburg Ballet is to create new, contemporary forms in connection with the classical ballet tradition.

=== On stage ===
One of John Neumeier's artistic focuses lies on the revision of evening-length narrative ballets such as The Nutcracker (1971), Illusions – like Swan Lake (1976), A Cinderella's Story (1992), Sylvia (1997), which was originally created for the ballet of the Paris Opera, and Giselle (2000).

The repertoire of The Hamburg Ballet also includes a variety of ballets choreographed to orchestral music. Of special importance is John Neumeier's Third Symphony of Gustav Mahler (1975). Taken together with other ballets set to the music by Mahler, Neumeier's works form a cycle. In addition, John Neumeier has created ballets to Johann Sebastian Bach's Saint Matthew Passion (1980) and Christmas Oratorio (Part I – III premiered in 2007, the complete work premiered on 8 December 2013), Wolfgang Amadeus Mozart's Requiem (1991) and George Frideric Handel's Messiah (1999). In addition, various composers were commissioned to compose for John Neumeier's ballets. One of them is Alfred Schnittke, who contributed the music to Peer Gynt (1989). Lera Auerbach composed the music for Préludes CV (2003) and The Little Mermaid (2005).

In addition, the company dances ballets based on world literature. John Neumeier created The Lady of the Camellias (1978) based on the novel by Alexandre Dumas and A Streetcar Named Desire (1983) based on Tennessee Williams for Marcia Haydée. Neumeier has also created adaptations of Henrik Ibsen's Peer Gynt (1989), Homer's Odyssey (1995), Anton Chekhov's The Seagull (2002) and Thomas Mann's Death in Venice (2003). William Shakespeare plays a very important role for the Director and Chief Choreographer: With inspiration from the Elizabethan writer, John Neumeier choreographed As You Like It (1985), Hamlet (1985), A Midsummer Night's Dream (1977), Romeo and Juliet (1971), VIVALDI or What you will (1996) and Othello (1985). A revival of the latter opened the season in 2013/14. Neumeier also turned Ferenc Molnár's Liliom into a ballet in 2011.

Another important aspect in John Neumeier's artistic work is the exploration of musical genre. He staged Leonard Bernstein's West Side Story (1978) and On the Town (1991). He also developed a rhapsodic form, which can be found in the ballet revue Shall we dance? (1986) and in Bernstein Dances (1998).

The Hamburg Ballet does not only dance creations by John Neumeier: The repertoire of the company includes ballets by George Balanchine, Maurice Béjart, John Cranko and Mats Ek, among others. There are also reconstructions of historical choreographies, such as Vaslav Nijinsky's Le Sacre du Printemps by Millicent Hodson. In the 2010/11 season, the works Dances at a Gathering and The Concert by Jerome Robbins became part of the repertoire as Chopin Dances. In 2012, The Hamburg Ballet performed Renku, choreographed by company members Yuka Oishi and Orkan Dann. The same year a new production of John Cranko's Onegin was staged at the Hamburg State Opera.

=== Film versions ===
A film version of John Neumeier's Lady of the Camellias premiered in 1987. The lead roles were danced by Marcia Haydée (Marguerite) and Ivan Liška (Armand Duval). In addition, the German broadcasters NDR and ZDF filmed Third Symphony of Gustav Mahler, Wendung (String Quintet in C major by Franz Schubert), Kinderszenen (1974) and Othello. Illusions – like Swan Lake, Death in Venice and Saint Matthew Passion with dancers of the Hamburg Ballet were also filmed.

== Features ==
=== Ballet Workshops ===
Since 1973 the Ballet Workshops ("Ballett-Werkstätte"), shown several times each season, are traditionally held on a Sunday morning. John Neumeier speaks about a topic, which is then illustrated by the company. He explains creative processes to the public and examines other dance related subjects, such as: "The Petipa Era" (1978), "Revival of a Ballet – Copy or Creation" (1987) or "Danced Violence" (1988). Newer Ballet Workshops covered themes such as "Orpheus and...", "The Little Mermaid reappears" or "Debut". A four-part Ballet Workshop was recorded by the German broadcaster NDR. It made the work of the main soloists in the 80s (Marianne Kruuse, Ivan Liska, Kevin Haigen) known to a wider audience. In 1982 four more workshops were produced for television. In the 2012/13 season Neumeier and his company gave the audience insight into the development of his ballets for the 200th time.

=== Hamburg Ballet-Days ===
Since 1975 the Hamburg Ballet Days (Hamburger Ballett-Tage) have been established as festival at the end of the season. The festival usually starts with the premiere of a new ballet. In 2014, the Hamburg Ballet Days opened with the premiere of John Neumeier's Tatiana with a newly commissioned score by Lera Auerbach, a ballet after the verse novel by Alexander Puschkin. The festival concludes with the "Nijinsky-Gala", where The Hamburg Ballet and international acclaimed guest dancers present excerpts of various ballets. The Gala is dedicated to the great dancer and choreographer Vaslav Nijinsky. Traditionally, during the festival another renowned ballet company gives guest performances at the Hamburg State Opera. In 2010, the Tokyo Ballet visited, and in 2013 the Bayerisches Staatsballett as well as Les Ballets de Monte Carlo were guests in Hamburg. At the end of the season 2013/14 Nederlands Dans Theater will give guest performances.

=== The Ballet Center Hamburg – John Neumeier ===
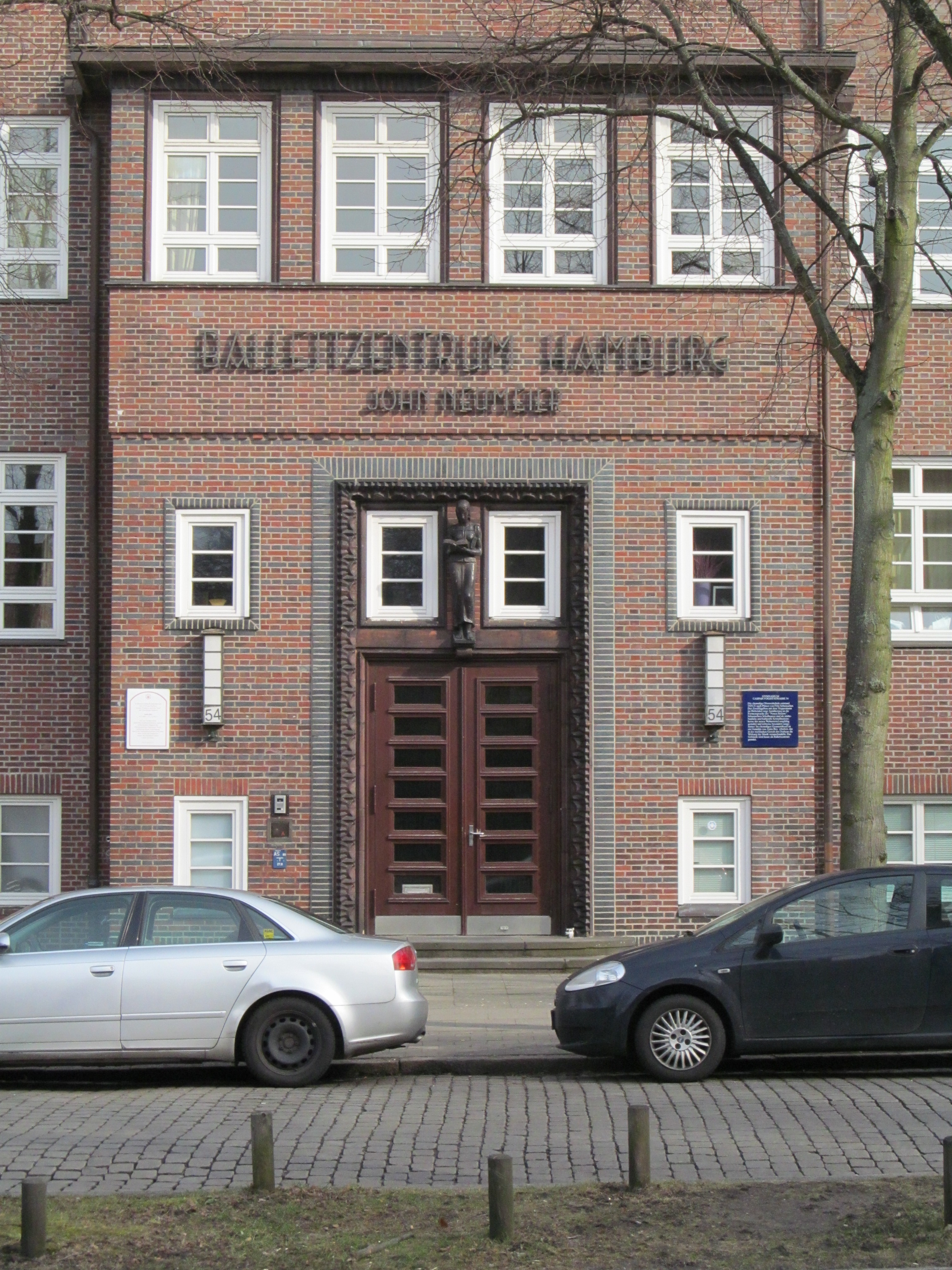
entrance of Ballettzentrum Hamburg

The School of The Hamburg Ballet was established in 1978. The ballet students are taught at the Ballet Center Hamburg ("Ballettzentrum Hamburg – John Neumeier"). The building, once a secondary school for girls, is one of the last buildings designed by the famous Hamburg architect Fritz Schumacher. There are nine ballet studios, where both members of the company, as well as students, can train and rehearse. In addition, the boarding school can house 35 young people.

The international students, aged 10 to 18 years, are educated to become professional stage dancers. The syllabus gives priority to all aspects of classical-academic dance. In addition, there are courses on modern dance technique, dance composition and folklore. The criteria for admission to the school are physical aptitude, rhythmic ability, dancing disposition, talent for improvisation and the level of classical ballet technique in relation to age. The entrance exams are held every year in spring. The minimum age for the preschool is 7 to 9 years, for training classes 10 to 16 years and for theater classes 16 to 18 years. Today about 80% of the company dancers have been educated at the School of The Hamburg Ballet.

The school is supported by the clubs Friends of the Hamburg Ballet Centre (Freunde des Ballettzentrums Hamburg) and Ballet Friends Hamburg (Ballettfreunde Hamburg). The Ballet Centre is also the home of the first German National Youth Ballet (Bundesjugendballett), but legally it does not belong to the Hamburg Ballet.

=== The Foundation John Neumeier ===
The Foundation John Neumeier was established on February 23, 2006. Together with the Hamburg State Opera and the Ballet Center Hamburg, the Foundation represents the third part of John Neumeier's artistic activities in the city. The foundation under curator Hans-Michael Schäfer serves science, research and documentation. Its function and aim is to preserve and portray the history of ballet through words and images, documents and objects. In this way, the achievements of John Neumeier and in particular his work with the Hamburg Ballet will be displayed.

== Ensemble 2025/2026 ==
=== Principal dancers ===
Name	Nationality	Training	Other companies (inc. guest performances)
Anna Laudere	Latvia	Riga Ballet School Hamburg Ballet School	Bayerisches Staatsballett Teatro alla Scala
Xue Lin	China	Beijing Dance Academy Hamburg Ballet School	National Ballet of China
Ida Praetorius	Denmark	Royal Danish Ballet School	Royal Danish Ballet
Aleix Martínez	Spain	Escuela Ballet David Campos Studio Ballet Colette Armand, Marseille Hamburg Ballet School	
Matias Oberlin	Argentina Germany	Seminario Provincial de Ballet, Santa Fe Hamburg Ballet School	
Edvin Revazov	Ukraine	Bolshoi Ballet Academy Hamburg Ballet School	Bayerisches Staatsballett Teatro alla Scala Bolshoi Ballet Hamburger Kammerballett

=== Guest Artists ===
- Alina Cojocaru
- Christopher Evans
- Alessandro Frola
- Alexandr Trusch

=== Special Guest Actors ===
- Silvia Azzoni
- Alexandre Riabko

=== Soloists ===
- Olivia Betteridge
- Futaba Ishizaki
- Charlotte Larzelere
- Charlotte Kragh
- Emilie Mazoń
- Ana Torrequebrada
- Florian Pohl
- Daniele Bonelli
- Louis Musin

=== Corps de Ballet ===
- Lormaigne Bockmühl
- Ghanima Choffat
- Justine Cramer
- Eleanor Broughton
- Anita Ferreira
- Francesca Harvey
- Paula Iniesta
- Almudena Izquierdo
- Greta Jörgens
- Alice Mazzasette
- Amelia Menzies
- Hayley Page
- Madeleine Skippen
- Ida Stempelmann
- Hermine Sutra Fourcade
- Lin Zhang
- Joaquin Angelucci
- Gabriel Barbosa
- Jack Bruce
- Francesco Cortese
- Bruno Garibaldi
- Pepijn Gelderman
- Lennard Giesenberg
- Louis Haslach
- Samuel Legaspi
- Evan L'Hirondelle
- Luis Molina
- Javier Monreal
- Vincent Philp
- Artem Prokopchuk
- Filipe Rettore
- Moisés Romero
- João Santana
- Caspar Sasse
- Torben Seguin
- Emiliano Torres
- Illia Zakrevskyi

=== Apprentices ===
- Selina Appenzeller
- Azul Ardizzone
- Melissa Koivuaho
- Zeynep Demirel
- Yun Lin
- José Abílio Neri
- Jiwei Sui

== Former dancers ==
- Maria Eglevsky – American ballet dancer, Harkness Ballet Company, principal dancer with the Royal Winnipeg Ballet and the Hamburg Ballet
- Marcia Haydée (born 1937) – Brazilian ballet dancer, choreographer and director
- François Klaus – Geneva Ballet, Stuttgart Ballet and principal dancer at Munich Ballet (both under John Cranko), Hamburg Ballet. Artistic Director of Bern Theatre and Queensland Ballet
- Marianne Kruuse – Danish ballet dancer, soloist at Hamburg Ballet under John Neumeier
- Lawrence Leritz – American ballet/Broadway dancer, fitness expert, director and choreographer
- Ivan Liška (born 1950) – Czech-German ballet dancer, soloist at Hamburg Ballet under John Neumeier, later director of Bayerisches Staatsballett, Munich
- Magali Messac – European ballet dancer. As a principal dancer with the Hamburg Ballet, Pennsylvania Ballet, Pacific Northwest Ballet and the American Ballet Theatre
- Max Midinet – Soloist at Hamburg Ballet under John Neumeier
- Colleen Scott – Soloist at Hamburg Ballet under John Neumeier
- Hélène Bouchet
- Madoka Sugai
- Leslie Heylmann
- Jacopo Bellussi
- Christopher Evans
- Lloyd Riggins
- Ivan Urban

== See also ==
- List of productions of Swan Lake derived from its 1895 revival
