= Tokyo Ballet =

Ballet company in Tokyo, Japan

The Tokyo Ballet

General information
- Name: The Tokyo Ballet
- Local name: 東京バレエ団
- Year founded: 1964
- Founder: Tadatsugu Sasaki
- Principal venue: Tokyo Bunka Kaikan
- Website: The Tokyo Ballet Official Website

Senior staff
- Executive director: Norio Takahashi
- Director: Munetaka Iida

Artistic staff
- Artistic director: Yukari Saito
- Ballet mistress: Shiori Sano

Other
- Associated schools: The Tokyo Ballet School
- Formation: Principals; Soloists; Artists (Corps de Ballet)

The Tokyo Ballet is a classical ballet company, based in Tokyo, Japan, founded in 1964.

It is one of the leading performing arts companies in Japan.

== History ==
European classical ballet, heavily influenced by Russian methods, was introduced to Japan following the end of World War II. By 1959, there were at least 18 classical ballet schools found in Tokyo run by ballet companies, with perhaps 100 throughout Japan.

Tokyo Ballet was founded in 1964. It began as a performance company for graduates of one of Tokyo's first classical ballet schools, Tokyo Ballet Gakko. It was soon directed by Tadatsugu Sasaki. Sasaki envisioned a large company with well-trained ensemble dancers, and developed ties to the international ballet community. In 1966, the Company embarked on its first overseas tour to Moscow, Leningrad and Kazan, which led it to being awarded the title of “Tchaikovsky Memorial” from the Soviet Ministry of Culture.

The company's first European tour took place in 1970. International ballet companies were soon brought to perform in Tokyo, and Tokyo Ballet expanded its international touring. The cultural exchange included works by the international choreographers. The Tokyo Ballet currently has 21 works by Maurice Béjart in its repertory; Béjart bequeathed much of the performing rights of his works to Tokyo Ballet.

== Repertoire ==
The Tokyo Ballet has a wide range of repertoire from classical full-length ballets to works of contemporary choreographers. In particular, the company has original works created by three choreographers representing the contemporary ballet scene: Maurice Béjart's The Kabuki (1986), Bugaku (1989) and M (1993), Jiří Kylián’s Perfect Conception (1994) and John Neumeier's Seven Haiku of the Moon (1989) and Seasons – The Colors of Time (2000).

The Company has also staged contemporary choreographers’ works, such as Vladimir Vasiliev’s Don Quixote (2001), Natalia Makarova’s La Bayadère (2009), Mats Ek’s Carmen (2013), John Neumeier’s Romeo and Juliet (2014), William Forsythe's In the Middle, Somewhat Elevated (2015), Anna-Marie Holmes' Le Corsaire (2019).

Tokyo Ballet's repertory of classics includes The Nutcracker, Giselle, The Sleeping Beauty, Paquita, Swan Lake (Gorsky, V. Burmeister), La Sylphide (P. Lacotte), La Fille du Danube and Les Sylphides, Le Spectre de la Rose, Petrushka (Fokine), Afternoon of a Faun (Nijinsky). The company has also performed modern works, including Le Palais de Cristal, Theme and Variations, and Tschaikovsky Piano Concerto No. 2 by George Balanchine. In 2010 the company premiered John Cranko’s Onegin and Sir Frederick Ashton’s Sylvia.

== International Tours ==
In 2019, The Tokyo Ballet completed 775 performances on 34 overseas tours to mark a record in the history of Japanese performing arts. The company has been invited to theaters such as the Opéra national de Paris, the Teatro alla Scala di Milano, the Wiener Staatsoper, the Deutsche Oper Berlin, The Bolshoi Theatre and the Mariinsky Theatre, performing in over 155 cities across 32 countries. The Company performed for the first time in South America in 1998, playing to capacity crowds at the Teatro Colón, as well as at other opera houses in Argentina and Brazil.

== See also ==
- Japan Performing Arts Foundation(NBS)(in English and Japanese)
