= Vadym Pysarev =

Ukrainian dancer (born 1965)

Vadym Pysarev Вадим Яковлевич Писарев
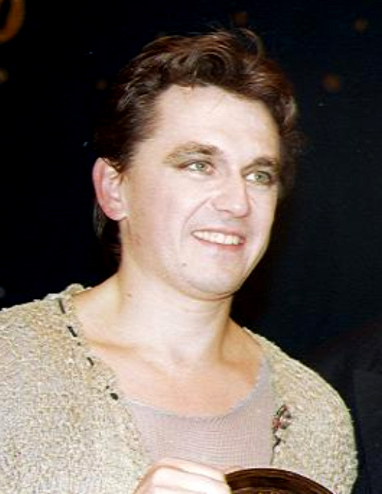
- Pysarev before 2000
- Born: Vadym Yakovlevych Pysarev; 1 February 1965 (age 61); Donetsk, Ukrainian SSR, Soviet Union
- Occupation: Dancer
- Website: Donetsk State Academic Opera and Ballet Theatre; World Ballet Stars festival

Vadym Pysarev (Ukrainian: Вадим Якович Писарєв; is a famous Ukrainian dancer, People's Artist of Ukraine, Art Director of Donetsk State Academic Opera and Ballet Theatre named after A. Solovyanenko, founder and director of international festival World Ballet Stars.

== Early life and education ==
Vadym Yakovlevych Pysarev was born on February 1, 1965, in Donetsk. In 1983 he graduated from the Kiev State Choreographic School, where his teachers were Irina Bulatova and Vladimir Denisenko. From 1984 to 1985, Pysarev was trained at the Bolshoi Theatre (Moscow) by such teachers as V. Nikonov, R. Struchkov and A. Messerer. In 1991 he practiced in Mariinsky Theatre (at that time Kirov Opera and Ballet Theatre), (Saint Petersburg) and ten years later, graduated from Kyiv National University of Culture and Arts.

== Awards ==
At the 1st all-Ukrainian competition of ballet dancers and choreographers in 1984 in Kyiv Vadym Pysarev won the first prize and was awarded with a gold medal. In June of the same year he won second prize and silver medal at the International Ballet Contest in Helsinki, Finland, and a bronze medal in November 1984 in Paris, France, at the 1st International Ballet Contest. In 1984 Vadym Pysarev was awarded the title of Honoured Artist of Ukraine.

- In 1985 Vadym Pysarev won the Gold Medal at the Fifth all-Soviet Union Ballet Contest in Moscow.
- In 1986 he won the Gold Medal at the International Ballet Competition in Jackson, Mississippi (United States), and the same year was awarded the title of People's Artist of Ukraine.
- In 1988 he was awarded the Lenin Komsomol Prize. Prior to this, he went on tour in the USA, together with the Moscow Ballet (1987) and with Donetsk Opera and Ballet Theatre Company (1988)
- In 1990 he won the Moscow public prize "The Best USSR Dancer"
- In 1995 - UNESCO prize "The Best Dancer of the World"
- In 1996, commissioned by Norwegian government, Vadym Pysarev staged the ballet Peer Gynt and played the lead role with the Donetsk troupe at the celebrations of the 1000th anniversary of the first capital of Norway, Trondheim. For this performance he was awarded the Norwegian press prize "Golden Rose"
- In 1996 Vadym Pysarev won the Ukrainian "Man of the Year" award
- In 1997 he prepared a special show and participated in the celebration of the 3000th anniversary of Jerusalem. Same year Vadym Pysarev received the diploma "Golden Skif".
- In 1998 Pysarev was awarded the Theatre Union of Ukraine prize called "Triumph".
- In 1999 awarded the Order of Merit, III grade. Same year, Vadym Pysarev was awarded the Kazakhstan "Prize of Traditions" and won all-Ukrainian prize "Recognition"
- In 2001 awarded the Commander's Cross - Order of Saint Stanislaus, III grade.
- In 2003 awarded the Cabinet of Ministers of Ukraine honorary diploma "For Significant Personal Contribution to the Development of National Culture and Art, and High Professionalism"
- In 2004 awarded the Order of Merit, II grade.
- Vadym Pysarev is the Honorary Citizen of New Orleans and Baltimore

Pysarev was stripped of his Ukrainian state awards on 19 January 2025 by a decree of Ukrainian President Volodymyr Zelenskyy.

== Family ==
Vadym Pysarev is married with three children. His wife is prima ballerina, People's Artist of Ukraine, Inna Dorofeieva. His eldest son Andrey has followed in his father's steps and became a ballet dancer; recently he won a gold medal at prestigious XI International Ballet Competition in Moscow.

Pysarev likes picking mushrooms and fishing.

== Career ==
=== Dance ===
He performed leading roles in ballets:

- Don Quixote
- Swan Lake
- The Nutcracker
- Giselle
- Walpurgis Night
- Paquita
- The Sleeping Beauty
- Peer Gynt
- La Bayadère
- Le Corsaire
- Spartacus
- Romeo and Juliet

In 1996 Vadym Pysarev was appointed the Art Director of Donetsk State Academic Opera and Ballet Theatre named after Solovyanenko.

=== Choreographic School ===
In 1992 Vadym Pysarev, together with his wife, prima ballerina of Donetsk Opera and Ballet, People's Artist of Ukraine Inna Dorofeeva, established the Donetsk Opera and Ballet Theatre Choreographic School, also known as Vadym Pysarev Ballet School. It is the first Ukrainian non-governmental educational institution of this kind. Gifted children from Donetsk oblast' and other regions of Ukraine learn ballet skills at Vadym Pysarev' school, there's also a school board for non-resident students, with partial allowance.

In 1997, Vadym Pysarev Choreography School was awarded the Sergei Diaghilev Medal.
