= Donetsk State Academic Opera and Ballet Theatre =

Theatre in Donetsk, Ukraine

Coordinates: 48.0061°N 37.8028°E

- Донецький академічний державний театр опери та балету імені Анатолія Солов'яненка
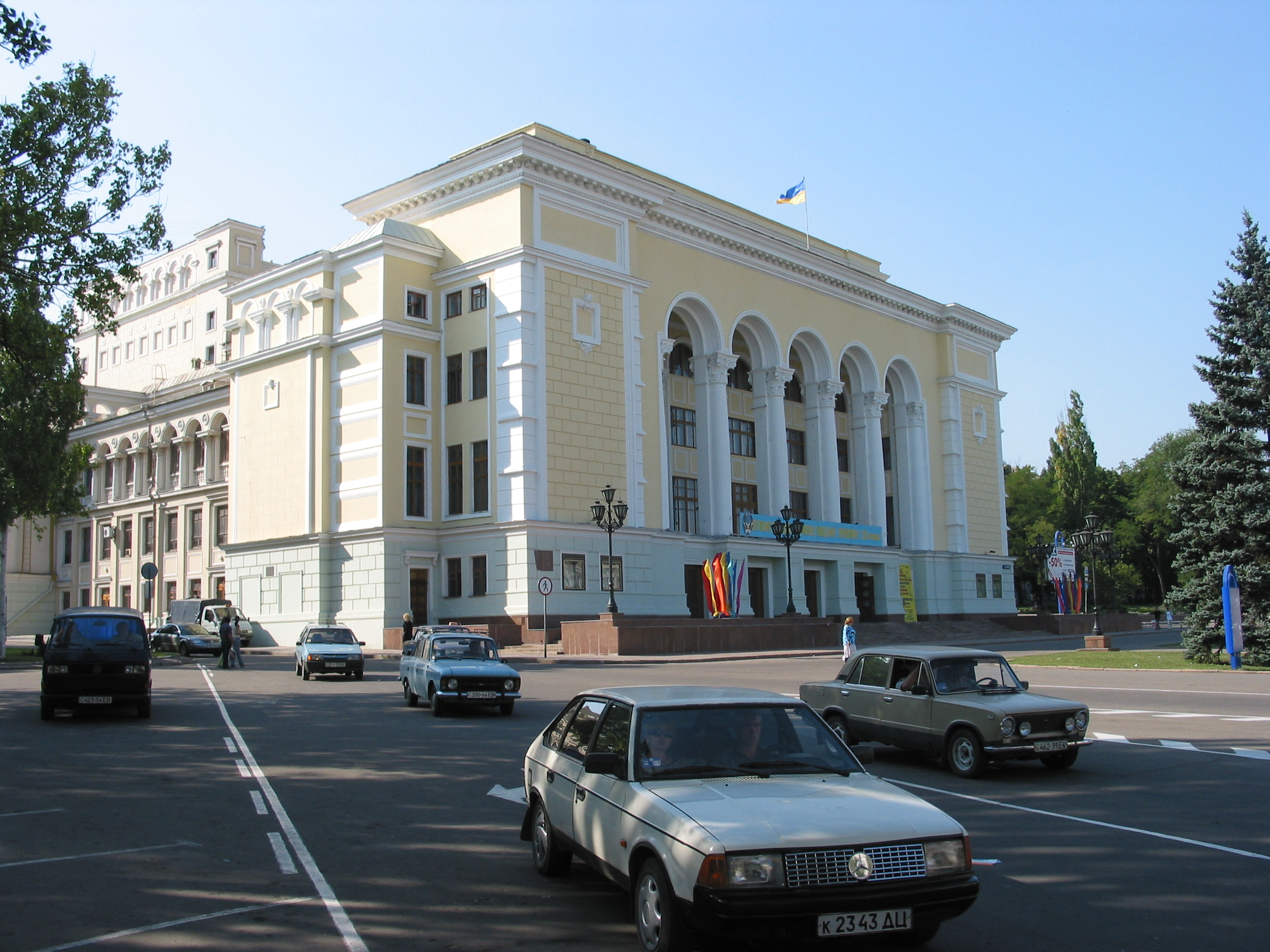
- Interactive map of Donetsk State Academic Opera and Ballet Theatre
- Address: Artema street, 82; Donetsk, Donetsk Oblast; Ukraine
- Capacity: 976 seats

Construction
- Opened: 12 April 1941

Donetsk State Academic Opera and Ballet Theatre named after A. Solovyanenko (Ukrainian: Донецький академічний державний театр опери та балету імені Анатолія Солов'яненка) was established in 1932 in Donetsk on the basis of fit-up theatre of Right-bank Ukraine. Since 15 March 1932 the theatre was transferred to Donetsk theatre group The first season opened on September 1, 1932, with opera Prince Igor composed by Alexander Borodin. On April 12, 1941, the Theatre opened the season in the new theater building by premiere of Mikhail Glinka's Ivan Susanin. On August 7, same year, the premiere of the first ballet performance Laurencia by Alexander Crain was held.

After the outbreak of the Great Patriotic War part of the company was evacuated to Kirghizia, later, in June 1942, the theater moved to Przhevalsk city, where actors held concerts in hospitals and military units. In January 1944 the theater returned to Donetsk and already in September, right after the liberation of the Donets Basin a premiere of Alexander Borodin's Prince Igor took place.

On October 2, 1977, the Theater was awarded with Academic status for significant contribution to the development of Soviet art. In 1992 the Choreographic School of Vadym Pysarev was established in the Theater. Starting from 1994 the Theater has been hosting the International Festival "World Ballet Stars", Vadim Pisarev is as well the founder and art director.

On December 9, 1999, by the Resolution of the Cabinet of Ministers of Ukraine, the theater was named after Soviet Ukrainian opera singer Anatoliy Solovyanenko.

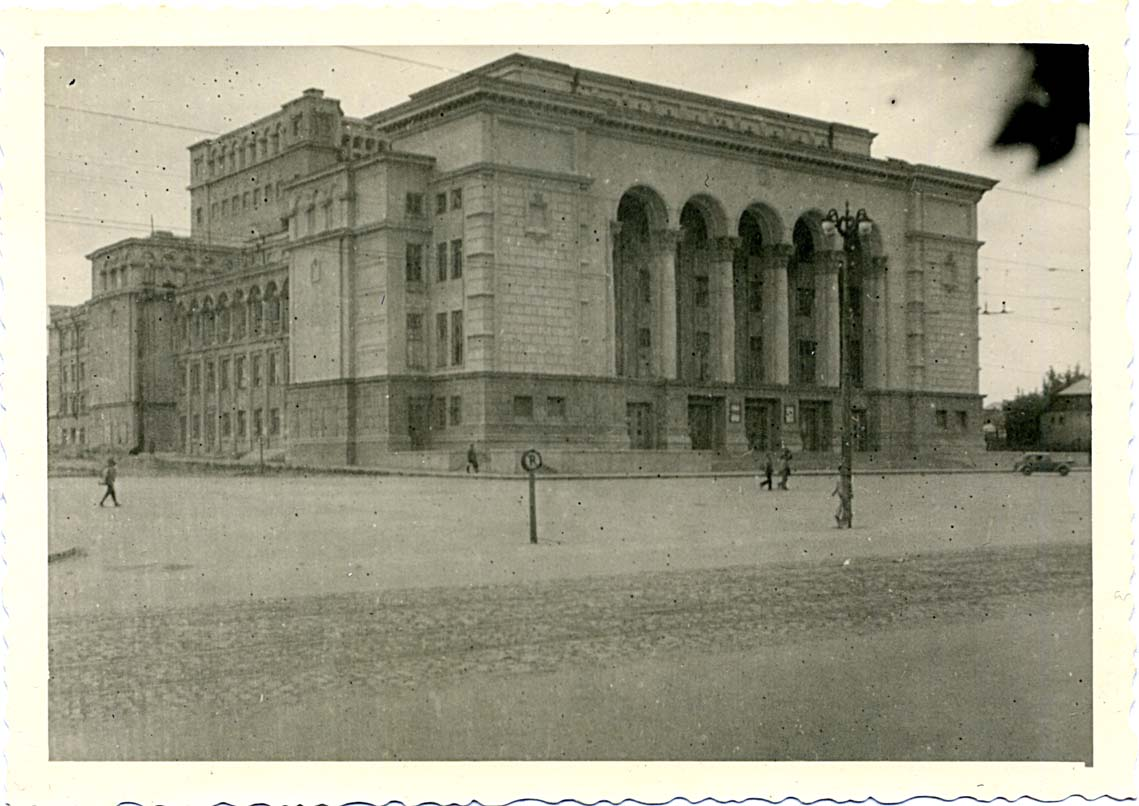
Donetsk Opera Theatre during Nazi occupation, 1941-1943

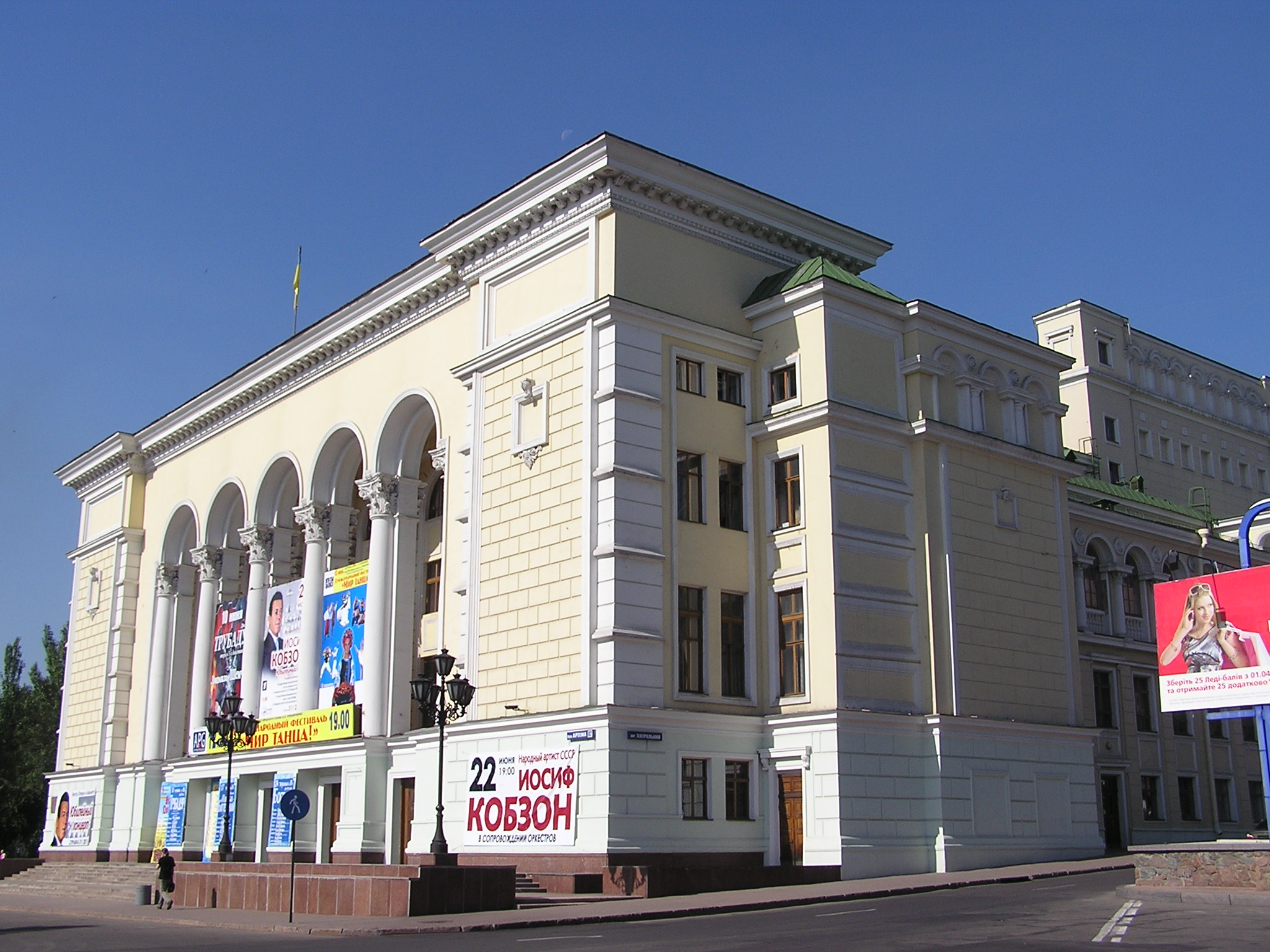
The Donetsk Opera Theatre in 2008

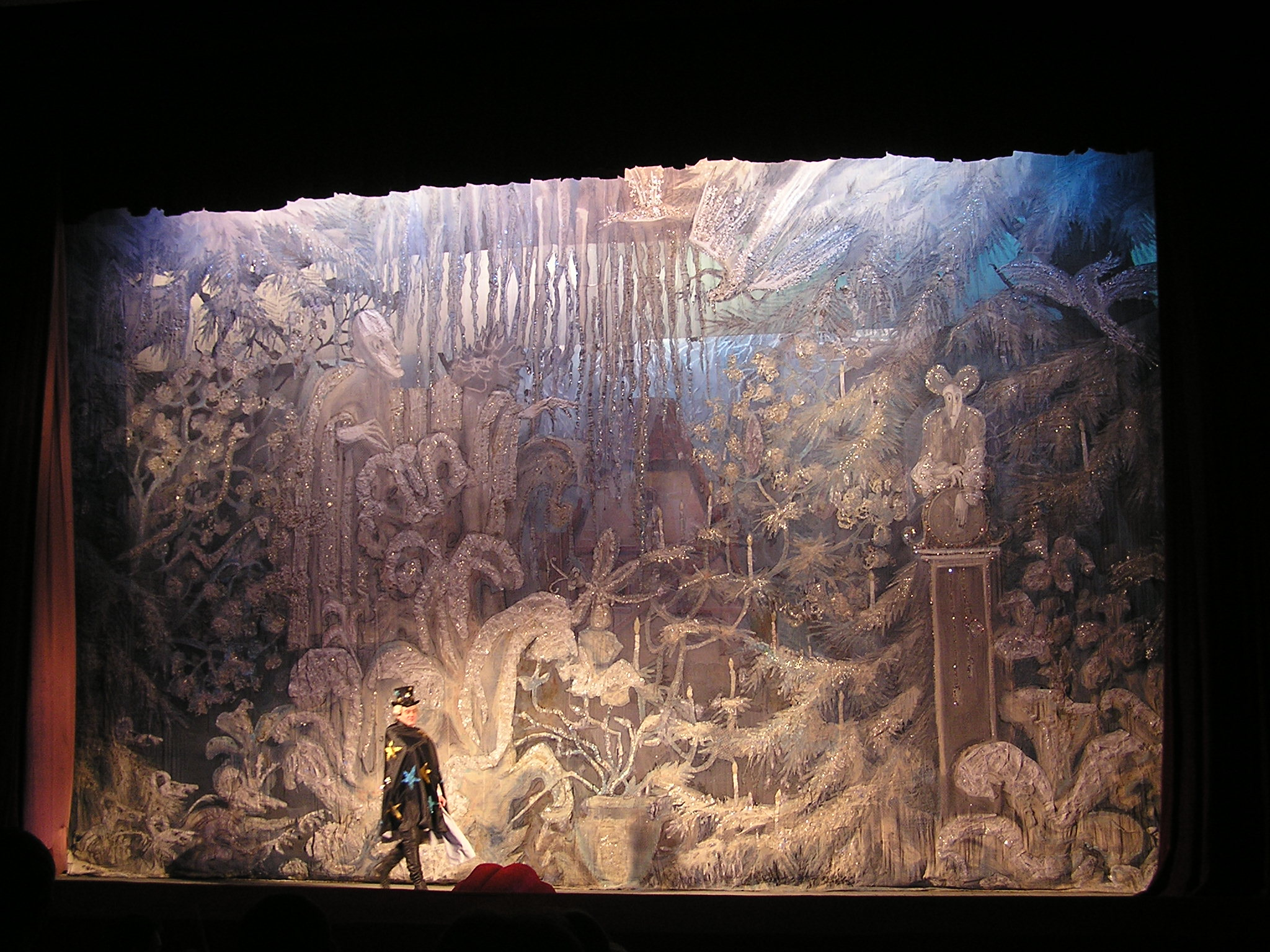
Cinderella performance

== Architecture ==
The theatre building was initially designed for drama theatre, construction works started in 1936. Ludwig Kotovskiy was the leading architect and overall management of construction project was scheduled by Solomon Krol'. The theater building is made in classic style. On three sides approaches to the theater are organized. The auditorium and the lobby are decorated with stucco details. Initially, the auditorium was designed for 1300 seats, at the present time there are 976. Above the mezzanine and balcony of the auditorium, as well as in some niches of the foyer there are sculptural busts of composers, poets and decorative vases. The theater is equipped with mechanized stage, the main stage area is 560 m2. It can withstand the load of up to 75 tons.

== The troupe ==
Many famous artists started their career in Donetsk Opera and Ballet Theatre, among them being Yuri Gulayev, Anatoliy Solovyanenko, Nickolay Momot, Valentin Zemlyanskiy, Alexander Korobeychenko and others - they were the People's artists of Ukraine. The Theatre was named after prominent opera tenor Anatoliy Solovyanenko, awardee of Taras Shevchenko and Lenin Prizes, who was born in Donetsk. In different years on the stage of Donetsk Opera and Ballet Theatre such stars of Soviet Union art danced and sang, as Ivan Kozlovsky and Sergei Lemeshev, Maria Bieshu, Olga Lepeshinskaya, Marina Semenova, Klavdiya Shulzhenko and many others. The troupe of the Theatre included as of 2014:

=== Management ===
- Director - Honoured Artist of Ukraine Vasiliy Ryabenkiy
- Art Director - People's Artist of Ukraine Vadim Pisarev
- Chief Choirmaster - People's Artist of Ukraine Ludmila Streltsova
- Chief choreographer - People's Artist of Ukraine Evgeniya Hasyanova
- Chief conductor - Honoured Artist of Ukraine Vasily Vasilenko

=== Opera ===
- People's Artist of Ukraine's Tamara Lagunova (since 1977)
- People's Artist of Ukraine Valentin Zemlyanskiy
- People's Artist of Ukraine Nickolay Momot (since 1969)
- Honored Artist of Ukraine Kaleria Kamenyanova
- Honored Artist of Ukraine Petr Labatiy
- Honored Artist of Ukraine, Anatoly Voronin
- Honored Artist of Ukraine Vasily Sorokin (since 1966)

=== Ballet ===
- Anastasia Aseyeva
- Svetlana Bednenko
- Roman Belgorodskiy
- Yekaterina Botaikina
- Inna Dorofeieva
- Maxim Valchik
- Irina Komarenko, Honored Artist of Ukraine
- Yulia Polgorodnik, Honored Artist of Ukraine

and many others.

== See also ==
- Donetsk National Academic Ukrainian Musical and Drama Theatre
