= Igone de Jongh =

Dutch ballet dancer

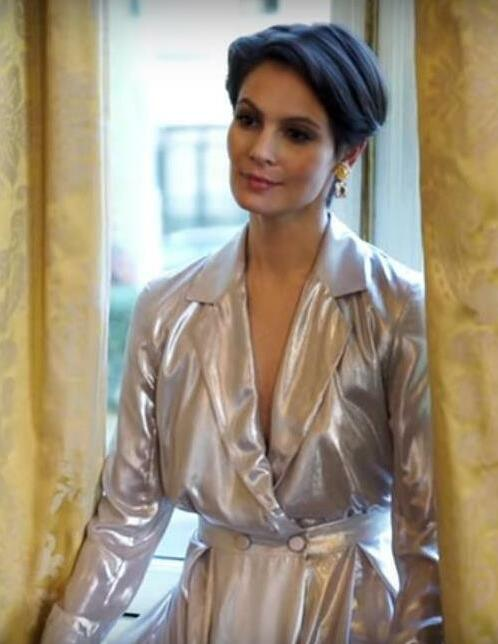
Igone de Jongh (2020)

Igone de Jongh (born 9 September 1979) is a Dutch ballerina and a former principal dancer with the Dutch National Ballet. She is featured in the music video for Anouk's song Birds, the official Netherlands entry to the Eurovision Song Contest 2013.

== Biography ==
Born in Haarlem in the Netherlands, De Jongh became interested in ballet when she was four years old after seeing a performance of The Sleeping Beauty on television. She trained at the National Ballet Academy of Amsterdam and later at the Royal Ballet School in London. In 1996, she was appointed as élève at the National Ballet in Amsterdam. In 2003, she was promoted to First Soloist. In 2014, the Dutch National Ballet reported that De Jongh was the only dancer currently working with the company who had gone through all the ranks, from aspirant (1996) to principal (2003).

De Jongh has danced many leading roles at the National Ballet including those in classical ballets such as Romeo and Juliet, Swan Lake, Giselle, The Sleeping Beauty and The Nutcracker. She has also starred in La Bayadère, in Bournonville's La Sylphide and in Balanchine's Agon, Apollo and Jewels as well as in ballets choreographed by William Forsythe, Ted Brandsen, David Dawson and Wayne Eagling. She also performed in the music video for Anouk's song Birds, the official Netherlands entry for the Eurovision Song Contest 2013.

Among De Jongh's awards are the Arnold Haskell Award (1996) for promising young dancer, the Encouragement Award Dancers Fund Foundation (2002) and the Alexandra Radius Prize (2002). In 2007 and in 2010, she was nominated for the Prix Benois de la Danse De Jongh danced the role of the ballet teacher in the 2021 ballet film, Coppelia, a modern adaptation of the E.T.A. Hoffmann story combining live dance with animation.

Her partner was former soloist Mathieu Gremillet with whom she has a son. She is said to be the muse of Hans van Manen Since the end of 2016 she is in a relationship with Dutch actor Thijs Römer, they married in October 2019. In January 2023 she announced her divorce from actor Römer.
