= John Neumeier =

American ballet dancer, choreographer and director (born 1939)

- Born: February 24, 1939 (age 87); Milwaukee, Wisconsin, U.S.
- Occupations: Ballet dancer; Ballet master; Choreographer; Ballet director
- Organizations: Stuttgart Ballet; Hamburg Ballet; Hamburg State Opera
- Awards: Deutscher Tanzpreis; Kyoto Prize; Prix de Lausanne; Pour le Mérite

John Neumeier (born February 24, 1939) is an American ballet dancer, choreographer, and director. He was the director and principal choreographer of Hamburg Ballet from 1973 to 2024 and the artistic director of the ballet at the Hamburg State Opera from 1996-2024.

In 1978 he founded The School of the Hamburg Ballet, which includes a boarding school for 34 students. He has been the general director and artistic supervisor of the German National Youth Ballet since it was founded in 2011.

== Life and career ==
Neumeier was born in Milwaukee, Wisconsin, where he received his first ballet training. He continued his dance training in Chicago at the Stone-Camyrn School of Ballet and performed with Sybil Shearer and Ruth Page. After completing a BA in English Literature and Theater Studies at Marquette University in 1961, he continued his training in Copenhagen with Vera Volkova and at the Royal Ballet School in London. In 1963 he joined the Stuttgart Ballet under John Cranko, rising to the rank of soloist. In 1969 Neumeier became director of the Frankfurt Ballet, before becoming director and principal choreographer at the Hamburg Ballet in 1973. From 1971-1974 Neumeier was also guest choreographer for the Royal Winnipeg Ballet, where he provided repertoire and staged his version of The Nutcracker.

In 2001 and 2008 he served as a president of the jury at the Prix de Lausanne ballet competition.

== Personal life ==
Neumeier and his partner, German cardiovascular surgeon Hermann Reichenspurner, got married in 2018 after 14 years together. They live in Hamburg.

== Noted works ==
Neumeier's choreographic output consists of more than 170 works, including many evening-length narrative ballets. Many are drawn from literary sources, such as Don Juan (created for the Frankfurt Ballet, 1972), Hamlet Connotations (1976) The Lady of the Camellias (Stuttgart Ballet, 1978, 2010), A Streetcar Named Desire (Stuttgart Ballet, 1983), Peer Gynt (1989), The Seagull (2002), Death in Venice (2003), The Little Mermaid (Royal Danish Ballet, 2005), Liliom (2011) and Tatiana (2014).

His adaptations of plays by William Shakespeare are of particular importance. They include Romeo and Juliet (Frankfurt Ballet, 1974), A Midsummer Night's Dream (1977), Othello (1985), As You Like It (1985), Hamlet (Royal Danish Ballet, 1985) and VIVALDI, or What You Will (1996). Neumeier has reinterpreted and rechoreographed the seminal classics of the 19th century: The Nutcracker (Frankfurt Ballet, 1971), set in the world of 19th-century ballet, Illusions, like Swan Lake (1976), based loosely on the life of Ludwig II of Bavaria, The Sleeping Beauty (1978) and Giselle (2000).

He has choreographed works on biblical subjects, including The Legend of Joseph (Vienna State Ballet, 1977), St Matthew Passion (1981), Magnificat (Paris Opera Ballet, 1987), Requiem (1991), Messiah (1999) and Christmas Oratorio (2007, 2013), as well as ballets inspired by mythological subjects: Daphnis et Chloe (Frankfurt Ballet, 1972), Sylvia (Paris Opera Ballet, 1997 and DVD in 2005 TDK including his talk), Orpheus (2009), Tristan (1982), The Legend of King Arthur (1982) and Percival – Episodes and Echo (2006). Neumeier's work is particularly inspired by the life and work of Vaslav Nijinsky and he has produced several ballets about him: Vaslav (1979), the full-length Nijinsky (2000) and Le Pavillon d'Armide (2009). Neumeier has also choreographed a number of ballets to the music of Gustav Mahler, including the biographical Purgatorio (2011), set to Deryck Cooke's reconstruction of Mahler's Tenth Symphony. In addition, Neumeier has choreographed Mahler's First (Lieb' und Leid und Welt und Traum, Ballet of the 20th Century, 1980), Third (1975), Fourth (Royal Ballet, 1977), Fifth (1989), Sixth (1984) and Ninth (In the Between, 1994) symphonies, as well as the Rückert-Lieder (1976), Des Knaben Wunderhorn (Soldier Songs, 1989) and Song of the Earth (Paris Opera Ballet, 2015).

In 2017 he created and directed a new production of Gluck's opera Orfeo ed Euridice for the Lyric Opera of Chicago featuring the Joffrey Ballet. Also in 2017, he premiered the full length ballet Anna Karenina in Hamburg, a co-production with the Bolshoi and the National Ballet of Canada.

== Awards ==
- 1988 and 2008: Deutscher Tanzpreis
- 1992: Prix Benois de la Danse for best choreography (first recipient, for Windows on Mozart)
- 2003: Legion of Honour chevalier
- 2006: Honorary citizen of Hamburg
- 2007: Herbert von Karajan Music Prize
- 2013: Gustaf Gründgens Prize
- 2015: Kyoto Prize
- 2017: Prix de Lausanne Life Achievement Award (first recipient)
- 2021: Ingenio et arti
- 2023: Premio "Una Vita nella Musica"
- 2023: Pour le Mérite
- 2024: Order of the Rising Sun, 3rd Class, Gold Rays with Neck Ribbon

== Bibliography ==
- John Neumeier, In Bewegung. Edited by Stephan Mettin, Collection Rolf Heyne, 2008. ISBN 978-3-89910-403-5
- John Neumeier. Images from a Life. Edited by Horst Koegler (German / English), Edel Germany, 2010. ISBN 978-3-941378-72-8
- John Neumeier. Trente ans de ballets à l'Opéra de Paris. Edited by Jacqueline Thuilleux (French), Editions Gourcuff Gradenigo, 2010. ISBN 978-2-35340-089-8
- Наталия Зозулина. Джон Ноймайер в Петербурге. Научный редактор В.В.Чистякова. Санкт-Петербург, "Алаборг", 2012. ISBN 978-5-85902-145-1
- Наталия Зозулина. Джон Ноймайер и его балеты. Вечное движение. Санкт-Петербург, Академия Русского балета им. А.Я.Вагановой, 2019. ISBN 978-5-93010-143-0
- Nijinsky. Ballett von John Neumeier. By Natalia Zozulina (German, ubersetzt aus dem Russischen von Natalia Freudenberg). St.Petersburg, 2020.
- Наталия Зозулина. Джон Ноймайер. Рождение хореографа. Санкт-Петербург, Академия Русского балета им. А.Я.Вагановой, 2021. ISBN 978-5-93010-182-9

== Sources ==
- Poletti, Silvia (2004). John Neumeier (in Italian). Palermo: L'Epos. ISBN 88-8302-239-4.
