= La Sonnambula (Balanchine) =

La Sonnambula (The Sleepwalker) is a ballet by the co-founder and ballet master of New York City Ballet, George Balanchine, made to Vittorio Rieti's music using themes from the operas of Vincenzo Bellini including La Sonnambula, Norma, I Puritani and I Capuleti e i Montecchi (1830–35).

The ballet premiered as The Night Shadow with the Ballet Russe de Monte Carlo on Wednesday, 27 February 1946, at City Center of Music and Drama, New York, with sets and costumes designed by Dorothea Tanning and costumes executed by Karinska. It was first performed by New York City Ballet on at City Center on 6 January 1960.

The ballet tells the story of a Coquette, a Poet, and a beautiful Sleepwalker. The original 1946 program describes the story as follows:

Amid the somber walls of a decaying castle a masked ball has just begun. The host, an eccentric nobleman, receives his guests, among them a poet and a dazzling coquette. The poet, seduced by her charms, dances with her as the guests gradually leave the scene, then she too leaves. As the poet turns to follow, he sees a lovely white apparition gliding across the roofs toward him. It comes nearer and he sees that it is a beautiful somnambulist. He loses his heart to her at once, unaware that she is married to the host who keeps her locked away from the world. They dance, and he sees to join her in her realm of dreaming sleep. But they are seen. The coquette, flushed with jealousy, steals out to tell the host....All too soon the marvelous sleep-walker drifts away. The poet would follow her but the guests reenter and their dancing forms a barrier. Finally, he breaks through and disappears but the host follows too and stabs him. As he lies unconscious among the terrified guests the white figure of his love appears once more, gently raises him and together they glide away.

The ballet was renamed La Sonnambula in 1961, and has been revived numerous times.

John Martin, reviewing the 1946 Ballet Russe premiere for The New York Times, called The Night Shadow "a foolish little piece of surrealism," but when the ballet was revived by New York City Ballet in 1960, he wrote that the work "is a manifestation of [Balanchine's] craftsmanship, his taste and his invention, and deserves to be treated accordingly." Allen Hughes, writing in the Times in 1965, was more enthusiastic:

"La Sonnambula" is not ranked among the greatest of Mr. Balanchine's ballets, but if it were the product of almost any other choreographer, it would probably qualify as one of that creator's masterpieces. It combines drama, divertissement, characterization and color with extraordinary dexterity and smoothness, and does it with astonishing fidelity to the excellent score Vittorio Rieti devised from Vincenzo Bellini's operatic airs.

Later Times critic Clive Barnes, writing in 1969, described La Sonnambula as "marvelous ballet - Balanchine at his greatest and most unexpected," and the next year called it "a wonderful piece. The more I see it, the more I love it." Arlene Croce of The New Yorker wrote in 1981 that in the ballet, "the transcendent purity of the music is liberated and its intrinsic dramatic power is confirmed." In 2008, Alastair Macaulay wrote in the Times that La Sonnambula "continues to enthrall. I follow it heart in mouth, like a thriller."

== Original cast ==
- Alexandra Danilova
- Maria Tallchief
- Ruthanna Boris
- Frederic Franklin
- Leon Danielian
- Marie-Jeanne
- Nicholas Magallanes
- Michel Katcharoff

== Reviews ==
- John Martin, "BALANCHINE DANCE IN WORLD PREMIERE; 'Night Shadow' Introduced by Ballet Russe at City Center --Music From Operas", New York Times, 28 February 1946
- Allen Hughes, "Ballet: 'La Sonnambula'; City Troupe Adds a Balanchine Dance to Repertory at State Theater", New York Times, 7 January 1965
- Alastair Macaulay, Four Distinct Dream Worlds, Sharing the Same Language of Classical Ballet, New York Times, 19 January 2008
- Deborah Jowitt, review, Village Voice, 5 February 2008
