= George Zoritch =

Russian-born American ballet dancer (1917–2009)

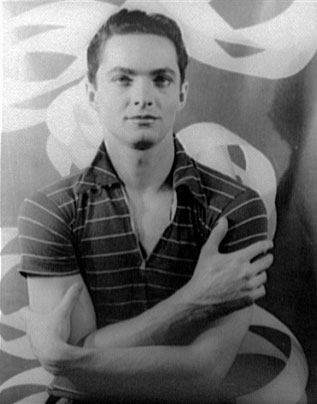
George Zoritch, photographed by Carl Van Vechten, 1942

George Zoritch (born Yuri Zorich; Russian: Юрий Зорич; 6 June 1917 – 1 November 2009), was a Russian-born American ballet dancer who starred in performances by Ballet Russe companies on stages all over the United States from the 1930s to the 1960s. Internationally known, he was one of the most glamorous figures and striking personalities in mid-twentieth-century ballet.

== Early life and training ==
George Zoritch was born in Moscow during the Russian Revolution in June 1917. He was the youngest of two sons. When he was a year old, the two boys were taken by their mother Elena, an opera singer, to the quieter city of Kovno (Kaunas), the provisional capital of Lithuania to live with her mother after she left her husband due to his infidelities. Known as "Little Paris" because of its rich cultural and academic life, the city offered refuge from the revolutionary strife of Moscow. There, Madam Zoritch joined the opera company at the National Opera and Ballet Theater, while Yuri and his older brother began their first dance lessons. When Yuri was 14 years old, the family relocated to Paris to advance his training. A promising student, he won a scholarship to study with one of the most prominent teachers in the city, Olga Preobrajenskaya, a former star of the Russian Imperial Ballet. In later years, he would polish his classical technique through study with such famous pedagogues as Anatole Vilzak, Anatole Oboukhoff, and Bronislava Nijinska.

== Professional career ==
After only nine months' study with Preobrajenskaya, young Yuri, was given his first professional job in 1932 by the dancer and actress Ida Rubenstein, who had a short season booked at the Paris Opera featuring ballets created by Michel Fokine. Following this engagement, Zoritch rapidly became a sought-after performer in a number of companies linked with former stars of Sergei Diaghilev's famous Ballets Russes.

=== Ballet Russe companies ===
An engagement with Nijinska's Ballets de Paris in 1935 led to his long-time membership in the two Ballets Russes offshoots formed after Diaghilev's death in 1929: Ballet Russe de Monte Carlo, directed by René Blum, and Original Ballet Russe, directed by Colonel Wassily de Basil. In the de Basil company, the 18-year-old Zoritch became a favorite of the choreographer Léonide Massine, who cast him in no fewer than eleven ballets, notably Symphonie Fantastique (1936), set to the hallucinatory music of Hector Berlioz. Massine and Tamara Toumanova took the lead roles of the Young Musician and the Beloved. Zoritch danced in the Melancholy pas de trois in the first movement (Reveries), as the Young Shepherd in the third movement (Scene in the Fields), and, with Roman Jasinski and Paul Petroff, as one of the three Monsters in the fifth movement (Dream of the Night of the Sabbath).

In 1938, after a dispute with Colonel de Basil, René Blum won legal rights to the name Ballet Russe de Monte Carlo, which he soon sold to wealthy American businessmen. With Massine as artistic director, they created a company expressly to tour the United States and to present occasional seasons in Monte Carlo and London. Yuri Zoritch, now known as George, was one of its principal male dancers, along with Igor Youskevitch and Frederic Franklin. They often danced with ballerinas Alexandra Danilova, Rosella Hightower, and Nathalie Krassovska. During the company's American tours over the next few years, Zoritch's startling good looks and winning personality on stage attracted increased attention to his dancing. "It is impossible for him to make a bad line, to move unrhythmically," wrote one critic, "for there is a catlike smoothness about everything he does."

Zoritch was notable in two new roles in vastly different works by Massine: in Bogatyri (1938), set to music by Alexander Borodin, he portrayed Khan, the fearsome Mongol leader, and in The New Yorker (1940), set to music by George Gershwin, he was the magazine's signature character of the effete Eustace Tilley. Neither of these works enjoyed much success, however, and both were soon dropped from the repertory. Between these two, Zoritch appeared in a more substantial ballet, as the Fiancé in Frederick Ashton's Devil's Holiday, a major work in a prologue and three scenes set to music by Vincenzo Tommasini on themes of Niccolo Paganini. Presented at the Metropolitan Opera House in October 1939. it had a star-studded cast and a complicated love story that required the Devil himself to sort out. Hence Ashton's alternate title: Le Diable s'Amuse.

=== Broadway and Hollywood ===
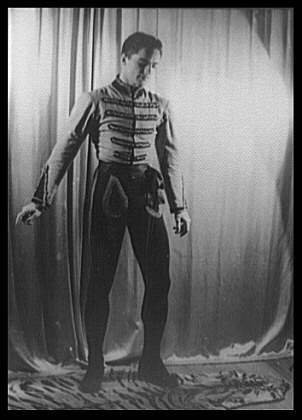
Zoritch as the Baron in Gaîté Parisienne (1942)

During the 1940s, Zoritch had a parallel career in Broadway musicals and Hollywood movies.

- 1943. Early to Bed. A musical comedy with book and lyrics by George Mason Jr., music by Thomas "Fats" Waller, and dances by Robert Alton. Zoritch appeared as Pablo, dancing with Jane Deering to "Slightly Less Than Wonderful."
- 1944. Rhapsody. An operetta with book by Leonard Louis Levenson and Arnold Sundgaard, music by Fritz Kreisler, and choreography by David Lichine. Zoritch danced with Patricia Bowman in "Chinese Porcelain Ballet" in act 1 and "Midnight Ballet" in act 2.
- 1946. Night and Day. A fictionalized biopic of Cole Porter, directed by Michael Curtiz and starring Cary Grant and Alexis Smith. Zoritch danced with Milada Mladova in a sultry "Begin the Beguine."
- 1947. Escape Me Never. A musical love story set in 1900 Venice, with Errol Flynn, Ida Lupino, Eleanor Parker, and Gig Young, who plays a composer of a ballet score. Zoritch dances the male lead in the ballet.
- 1949. Samson and Delilah. A Cecil B. DeMille epic, starring Victor Mature and Hedy Lamarr as the biblical lovers. Zoritch was eye-catching as the Sword Dancer.
- 1949. Look for the Silver Lining. A fictionalized biopic of vaudeville and Broadway star Marilyn Miller, starring June Haver, Ray Bolger, and Gordon MacRae. Zoritch appears in a balletic pas de trois with June Haver and Oleg Tupine while Gordon MacRae sings the waltz song "A Kiss in the Dark," written by Victor Herbert with lyrics by Buddy da Sylva.
- 1950. Pardon Our French. A musical revue with sketches by Ole Olson and Chic Johnson, music by Victor Young and Harry Sukman, and dances by various choreographers. Zoritch appeared as the Shadow Dancer in the opening number to the title tune; as the First Lover of Patricia Denise in "Venezia and Her Three Lovers," choreographed by Ernst Matray; and as a dancer in "A Face in the Crowd" and "The Polker Polka."
- 1956. Helen of Troy. A Technicolor epic directed by Robert Wise, with Rossana Podestá in the title role. Zoritch appears as an uncredited dancer.

Of Zoritch's performance in Night and Day, a writer in the Hollywood Reporter commented, "If the handsome Zoritch can act the way he dances and looks, there is another new-name star from this film.: Unfortunately, Zoritch never shed his thick Russian accent, which doomed his chances of ever taking speaking parts.

=== Back to ballet ===
In 1951, Zoritch went to France and joined Le Grand Ballet du Marquis de Cuevas. Based in Cannes in summer and Deauville in winter, this company had regular seasons in Paris and often toured in France and other countries of western Europe. Wherever it performed, it was extremely popular with audiences. It had an illustrious roster of ballerinas, including Tamara Toumanova, Alicia Markova, and Nathalie Krassovska, and a strong repertory of Russian classics as well as works by Harold Lander, George Balanchine, George Skibine, and John Taras. Zoritch danced the princely roles but was often cast in works that showcased the beauty of his physical features rather than the artistry of his dancing. He once took eighteen curtain calls after a performance of Le Spectre de la Rose, in a new version choreographed by Bronislava Nijinska. Costumed as the Spectre in a sheer, rose-colored body stocking with a single strand of small roses trailing across his bare chest and over one shoulder, his beautifully proportioned figure was perfectly revealed. It is little wonder at the audience's prolonged applause. There is a famous photograph by Maurice Seymour of Zoritch in this role, standing in repose with arms curved softly aloft, that has been much admired and frequently reproduced.

In 1957, at age 40, Zoritch returned to the United States and rejoined Ballet Russe de Monte Carlo, then under the direction of Sergei Denham. He soon demonstrated that he was, in the words of Walter Terry, "the perfect cavalier" for the company's current ballerinas and distinguished guests such as Alicia Alonso and Yvette Chauviré. Ann Barzel supported this judgment, claiming that Zoritch's "elegance was the backbone of the classics" in the company repertory. These included Giselle, The Nutcracker, Raymonda, and act 2 of Swan Lake. Basides these Russian classics, Zoritch excelled in other works in the repertory. He was particularly acclaimed as the Poet in Michel Fokine's Romantic reverie Les Sylphides, set to the music of Frédéric Chopin.

In the course of his long career, Zoritch's most famous role, however, was in a revolutionary work created in the early twentieth century: Vaslav Nijinsky's L'Après-midi d'un Faune, set to Claude Debussy's symphonic poem in 1912. Debussy's Prélude à l'Après-midi d'un Faune (1894), inspired by an 1876 poem of Stéphane Mallarmé, was considered by some music historians as "the beginning of modern music." Nijinsky's choreography was certainly new and modern, very different from previously seen forms of theatrical dance. George Zoritch was ideally suited to reinterpret Nijinsky's vision of a lusty young woodland creature lounging in the heat of a summer afternoon. With a figure that had been likened to "a Greek youth sculpted by Praxiteles," he projected an elegant eroticism particularly suited to the role.

== Later years ==
Having become an American citizen, Zoritch settled down in his new, adopted country and moved gradually from performing to teaching. He played an important part in the growth of regional ballet across the United States but remained associated with the Ballet Russe de Monte Carlo until 1962, when the company was dissolved. In 1964, he opened a ballet school in West Hollywood, California, where he exercised strict discipline and often employed sarcasm in giving corrections to his pupils. Finding children disagreeable, he preferred older students, to whom he gave master classes. Leaving California, he joined the dance faculty at the University of Arizona in Tucson. He established a home there and taught at the university from 1972 to 1987. He never really stopped teaching. Amazingly spry and upright even in old age, he had been known to teach from a wheelchair if the opportunity arose. In 1994, he was a recipient of a Vaslav Nijinsky Medal, sponsored by the Polish Artists Agency in Warsaw, for work in honor of Nijinsky, referring to his performances of Nijinsky's roles in Le Spectre de la Rose and L'Après-midi d'un Faune.

In his memoir, Zoritch readily acknowledged that he was not a bravura technician. Declaring that artistry was more important than technique for dancers like him, he wrote, "Good ballet dancing is not simply a gathering of a vocabulary of steps; it is more like a good conversation, having theme and meaning. None of us older dancers enjoyed the phenomenal techniques displayed by today's dancers. We enjoyed, however, a mood, a quality, and artistry, which comes from keen individual perception."

Zoritch's personality, charm, and wisdom survive delightfully in the 2005 documentary film Ballets Russes, a priceless reunion of the survivors from the post-Diaghilev days. Four years later, in 2009, he was hospitalized after a fall in his home in Tucson. He died in November, at age 92, beloved by former colleagues and students alike.
