= Anna Istomina =

Twentieth-century ballet dancer

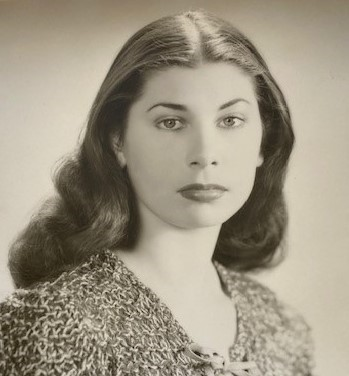
Audree Thomas, aka Anna Istomina, c. 1947

Anna Istomina, also known as Audree Thomas or Audree Ismailoff (9 October 1925–10 January 2014) was a Canadian-born ballet dancer and teacher.

== Early life and performing career ==
Born Audree Ruth Thomas in Vancouver, British Columbia, Canada, Thomas began her dance studies at age five at the Merinoff/Del Roy studio. As a young teen she studied ballet with June Roper, a Texas native who had found her way to Vancouver in the early 1930s and, over the next ten years, sent several students into professional ballet companies. Thomas auditioned for Léonide Massine in Seattle in January 1940, and, at age 14, became the youngest member of the Ballet Russe de Monte Carlo, under the stage name, Anna Istomina. In a few months she was dancing the "Swan Lake" pas de trois with Rosella Hightower and Roland Guerard and a pas de deux, as Princess Turandot, with Massine himself as the Unknown Prince, in "Vienna 1814." With the Ballet Russe Thomas toured North and South America extensively, ultimately dancing most of the roles in the repertoire. She met the Governor General of Canada in 1944 after a Montreal performance in the title role of "The Snow Maiden."

Thomas left the Ballet Russe de Monte Carlo after the 1943-44 season and performed for another fourteen years in several different companies. She joined Massine’s short-lived Ballet Russe Highlights. In 1947 and 1948 she danced for two seasons as Guest Prima Ballerina for Teatro Colón in Buenos Aires.There she performed both the classic repertoire and new productions created by Margarita Wallmann. Following a Buenos Aires performance as Odette in "Swan Lake," she was sought out by Argentina’s First Lady, Eva Perón. Thomas toured as First Soloist, after Slavenska herself, with Mia Slavenska’s Ballet Variante, running the company for a time and dancing Slavenska's roles while the latter was recovering from an injury. In 1952 she danced with Ballet Russe Concerts, a touring off-shoot of the Ballet Russe de Monte Carlo. In the mid-1950s she was Guest Prima Ballerina with the Ballet Nacional de Venezuela, returning to Venezuela to teach.

Among her many freelance appearances she was premiére danseuse in the 1945 Broadway production of "La Vie Parisienne". She appeared, in 1950, in Massachusetts’ Jacob’s Pillow Dance Festival, performing, as a soloist, Petipa's choreography from "Sleeping Beauty" and "The Nutcracker," and Massine's "Pavane" (Ravel); she also performed a "Swan Lake" pas de deux with Leon Danielian. She was a headliner, under the name Audree Thomas, in a show called "Carnival" at Radio City Music Hall, where she danced a pas de deux with George Zoritch, one of the Russian mainstays of the Ballet Russe de Monte Carlo. The same year she partnered with Roman Jasinski in a St. Louis Municipal Opera production of Emmerich Kalman's "Countess Maritza" and with Jasinski and Robert Pagent in Victor Herbert's "Mlle. Modiste."

== Marriage ==
Thomas married fellow dancer, Sergei Ismailoff, in Vancouver, in 1948. Born in Moscow in 1912, Ismailoff had escaped Europe in the early stages of the Second World War. He and Thomas danced together in the Ballet Russe de Monte Carlo. Their younger son, Greg, born in 1956, was dancing his way up the ranks of the ballet world, as Gregory Ismailov (note spelling). He died of AIDS at age thirty, shortly after joining Maria Tallchief’s Chicago City Ballet.

== Teaching ==
Thomas retired from performing in 1958 and turned to full time teaching, under the name Audree Ismailoff, in dance schools in Great Neck and White Plains, New York, that she and her husband had started. Following Sergei’s death in 1969 she continued teaching at the Dance Academy of White Plains.

== Later years and death ==
Thomas retired from teaching in 1985 and returned to British Columbia, living in West Vancouver. She set dancing aside except for occasional guest teaching at local dance schools. Struck by lymphoma in her later years, she moved to Gettysburg, PA, to live with her older son, Anthony, dying there on January 10, 2014, at the age of 88.

== Ballet Bay, B.C. ==
Beyond her career as a dancer, Audree Thomas was the inspiration for the name of a small bay on remote Nelson Island, 60 miles up the B.C. coast from Vancouver, on the traditional lands of the Sechelt (shíshálh) First Nation. Shortly after she joined the Ballet Russe de Monte Carlo, her parents, Harry and Marjorie (Midge) Thomas, set up a homestead there. Midge called their new home Ballet Bay in honor of their daughter, the name becoming official a few years later. Audree's ashes were scattered in Ballet Bay and a plaque in memory of “The Ballerina of Ballet Bay” sits on a low rock bluff at the back of the bay.

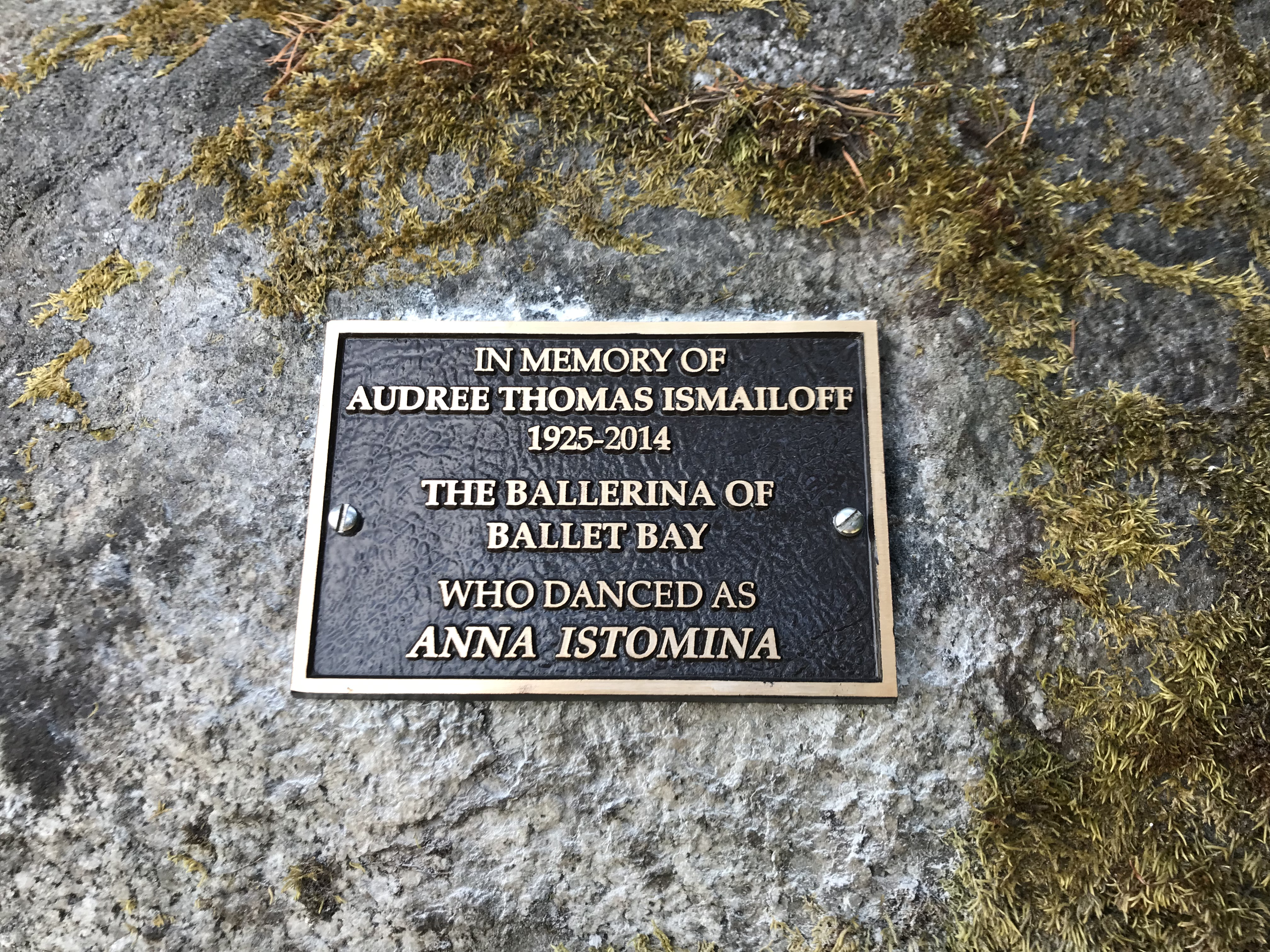
Memorial plaque for Audree Thomas Ismailoff (Anna Istomina) in Ballet Bay, British Columbia, Canada
