= The Gay Parisian =

1941 film

- Opening titles
- Directed by: Jean Negulesco
- Produced by: Gordon Hollingshead
- Starring: Ballet Russe de Monte Carlo
- Cinematography: Ernest Haller
- Edited by: Everett Dodd
- Music by: Efrem Kurtz
- Release date: 1941
- Running time: 20 minutes
- Country: United States
- Language: English

The Gay Parisian is an American short film produced in 1941 by Warner Bros. and directed by Jean Negulesco. The film is a screen adaptation, in Technicolor, of the 1938 ballet Gaîté Parisienne, choreographed by Léonide Massine to music by Jacques Offenbach. It was nominated for an Academy Award at the 14th Academy Awards for Best Short Subject (Two-Reel).

== Cast ==
- Ballet Russe de Monte-Carlo as Dancers
- Léonide Massine as The Peruvian (as Leonide Massine)
- Milada Mladova as The Glove Seller
- Frederic Franklin as The Baron
- Nathalie Krassovska as The Flower Girl
- Andre Eglevsky as Tortoni – The Dancing Master
- Igor Youskevitch as Officer
- Lubov Roudenko as Can-Can Dancer
- Casimir Kokitch as Dancer
- James Starbuck as Dancer
- Cyd Charisse as Dancer (uncredited)
