= Nathalie Krassovska =

Russian-born ballerina (1914–2013)

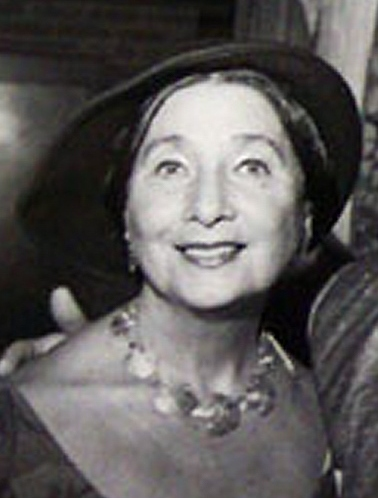
- Krassovska in 1988
- Born: Nathalie Krassovska; June 1, 1918; Petrograd, Russia
- Died: February 8, 2005; Dallas, Texas, U.S.
- Citizenship: United States
- Occupation: Ballerina

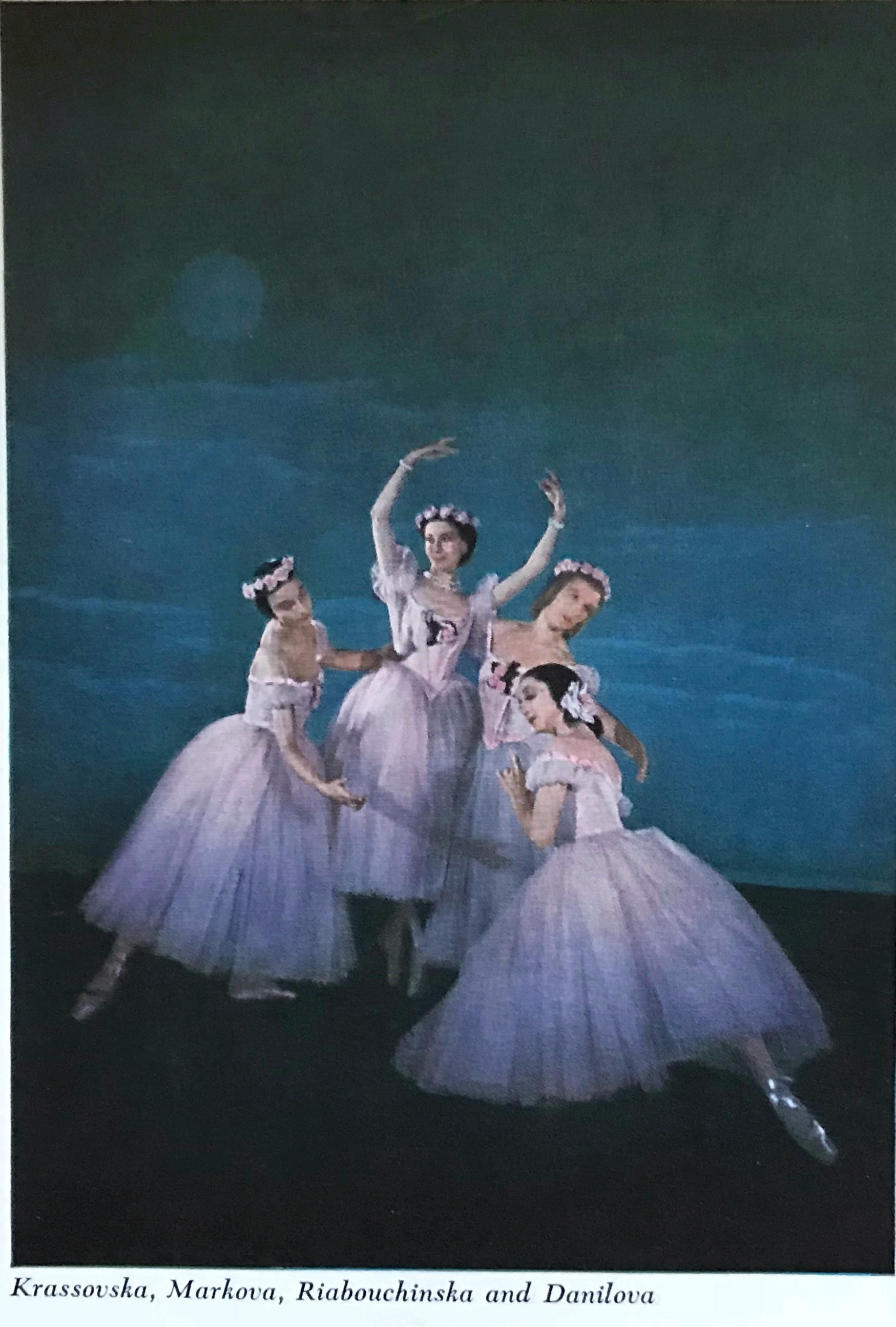
Krassovska, Markova, Riabouchinska, and Danilova in the ballet "Pas de Quatre"

Nathalie "Natasha" Krassovska (Note: Russian: Наталья Красовская, romanized: Natalya Krasovskaya.) (born Nathalie Leslie; (Note: Russian: Наталья Лесли, romanized: Natalya Lesli.) June 1, 1918 – February 8, 2005) was a Russian-born prima ballerina and teacher of classical ballet most noted for her work with the Ballet Russe de Monte Carlo. Following her decades-long career, she moved to the United States, where she founded the Krassovska Ballet Jeunesse. Krassovska taught, choreographed and performed until her death.

== Early life ==
Krassovska was born Nathalie Leslie in Petrograd, the daughter of a Russian mother and Scottish father. Depending on the source her birthdate is recorded as June 1 or June 3, with the year ranging from 1917 to 1919, most frequently 1918. Her grandmother was a soloist with the Bolshoi Ballet; her mother Lydia Krassovska was a dancer with Diaghilev's Ballets Russes.

Young Nathalie began her ballet studies with her grandmother, but her formal training took place in Europe. In Paris, she trained with Olga Preobrajenska, St. Petersburg's pre-Revolutionary prima ballerina. In London, she studied with Russian ballet master Nikolai Legat. Under the name of Nathalie Leslie, she danced with Ida Rubinstein's company at the Paris Opera. At age 14, she was selected by Bronislava Nijinska for her company, the Théâtre de la Danse. In 1933, she joined George Balanchine's short-lived Les Ballets. After Les Ballets, Krassovska partnered with Serge Lifar for a tour of South America.

== Ballet Russe de Monte Carlo ==
Krassovska joined the Ballet Russe de Paris in 1935 and René Blum’s Ballet Russe de Monte Carlo in 1936. In 1938, she became a member of the Massine-Denham Ballet Russe de Monte Carlo. During her time with the troupe, Krassovska worked closely with Mikhail Fokine, the well-known choreographer and reformer of conventional ballet traditions. Fokine personally coached her for roles in "Les Sylphides, Le Spectre de la Rose", and other ballets. She advanced to the position of ballerina (principal dancer) in 1938, and performed with the group until 1949.

During World War II, Ballet Russe de Monte Carlo moved its home base to New York, and toured primarily in the U.S. and Canada. Krassovska was acclaimed for her lyrical style, especially in performances of the Romantic ballets. In 1948, she premiered Pas de Quatre at the New York Met, alongside Alicia Markova, Alexandra Danilova and Mia Slavenska. Anton Dolin’s restaging of this Jules Perrot ballet from 1845 is an evocation of four legendary ballerinas from the Romantic era.

In 1949, Krassovska first danced the title role in Giselle, one of the most famous Romantic ballets. It was to become one of her signature roles. Writing of the performance, Montreal Daily Star dance critic S. Morgan-Powell reportedly wrote, "Her dancing was characterized by a purity of style not often seen nowadays in ballet." She was also noted for her performances in Les Sylphides, Scheherazade, The Snow Maiden, Swan Lake and The Nutcracker. In an American Dancer article, reviewer Albertina Vitak said, "Krassovska stands out over all and is one of the most valuable assets of the company."

Krassovska's repertoire was not limited to ballet blanc. She learned tap dancing for her character in The New Yorker, Leonide Massine's 1940 ballet based on cartoons from the popular magazine. For Capriccio Espagnol, another Massine work, Krassovska and the cast were required to execute Flamenco steps such as the bulerías and seguidilla.

== Career after Ballet Russe ==
Krassovska briefly joined Ballet Rambert in 1949. When Alicia Markova and Anton Dolin decided to found the London Festival Ballet in 1950, they asked her to be the second ballerina, partnering with English dancer John Gilpin. On opening night at the Stoll Theatre, Krassovska and Gilpin triumphed in Massine's Le Beau Danube. Their partnership became a major company attraction. After the first season, Markova left due to artistic conflicts with Dolin, and Krassovska took over as first ballerina. When Markova returned to the company (this time as guest artist), both she and Krassovska had the rank and status of prima ballerina, but Markova received top billing.

Krassovska stayed with Festival Ballet under contract through 1955, and then as guest artist through 1960. She continued to perform the standard 19th century repertory. She danced in Great Britain under both her stage name, Nathalie Krassovska, and her birth name Nathalie Leslie. As a guest artist with the Ballet Russe in the late 1950s, she used the surname Krassovska.

Krassovska moved to U.S. in the 1960s. Having toured the country a number of times, she decided that Dallas, Texas, with its flowers, trees and pleasant climate was one of the nicest cities. She opened a dance school at her home and founded a student company, Krassovska Ballet Jeunesse. She became an American citizen in 1964.

Krassovska was invited frequently as a guest teacher and coach throughout the Southeastern U.S. She danced in local productions of The Nutcracker into her 80s and produced her last concert, Tribute to Ballet Russe, at Southern Methodist University in 1997.

== Film ==
In 1941 and 1942, while a member of the Ballet Russe de Monte Carlo, Krassovska appeared in two movies choreographed by Massine, Spanish Fiesta (an adaptation of Capriccio Espagnol) and The Gay Parisian (also known as Gaité Parisienne). Her remarkable beauty caught the eye of David O. Selznick and he offered her a movie contract. Although it was a very difficult decision, she chose to remain with the ballet company.

For the 1953 film Never Let Me Go, Krassovska doubled in long shots for Gene Tierney in her role as a Russian ballet dancer.

Krassovska was interviewed and shown in archival footage for the 2005 documentary movie Ballets Russes.

== Personal life ==
Her romantic life was reputedly eventful and she was briefly married to an Austrian count. Another interest, outside of ballet, was the Eastern Orthodox Church. Krassovska helped raise $850,000 toward a construction project for the St. Seraphim Orthodox Church in Dallas.

== Death ==
Nathalie Krassovska died on February 8, 2005, due to complications from surgery. She is buried in Restland Memorial Park in Dallas.
