= George Verdak =

American ballet dancer and director

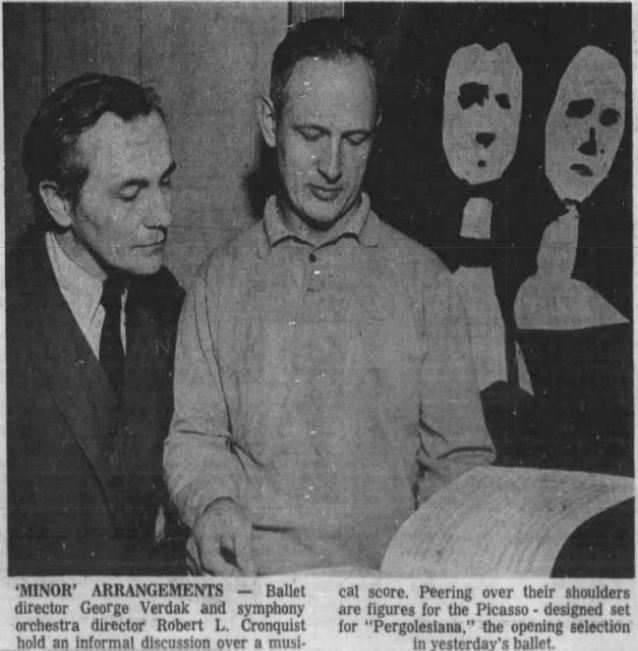
Verdak with symphony orchestra director Robert L. Cronquist

George C. Verdak (1923 – September 15, 1993) was an American ballet dancer, teacher, and director. He is best known for dancing with the Ballet Russe de Monte Carlo and for his work as a faculty member at Butler University. Verdak was born in Chicago, Illinois, and danced with the Chicago Repertory Ballet after attending the Art Institute in Chicago. He danced with the Ballet Russe de Monte Carlo for nine years before its disbandment in 1952. He spent time in Minneapolis, Minnesota, teaching dance, performing, and choreographing for the St. Paul Civic Opera Company. Verdak began work at Butler University in 1959 where he was the chairman of the dance department and directed the Butler Ballet Company. He was also awarded an honorary doctorate by the university. Verdak founded the Indianapolis Ballet Theater where he created more than 100 ballets. His choreography and set work are still used today, and the George Verdak Trust provides sets and scenery for ballets around the United States.

== Career ==
Verdak attended the Art Institute in Chicago before joining the Chicago Repertory Ballet. After that, his career took him to Hollywood where he danced in films. He was a dancer for the Ballet Russe de Monte Carlo from 1943 until it disbanded in 1952 and danced with dancers such as Alexandra Danilova, Mia Slavenska, Yvette Chauviré, and Alicia Markova. He spent time in Minneapolis teaching dance and performing with the Minneapolis Symphony. He choreographed for the St. Paul Civic Opera Company before joining the faculty at Butler University in 1959. He became the chairman of the dance department at Butler University and the director of the Butler Ballet Company. During Verdak's 25 years at Butler Ballet, he directed student performances and taught dance history and choreography. Butler University awarded him an honorary doctorate. Before retiring in 1988, he founded the Indianapolis Ballet Theatre (IBT) (later renamed Ballet Internationale) and worked as its artistic director. During his time at IBT, he applied his 50 years of dance experience to create more than 100 ballets.

=== Verdak's productions ===
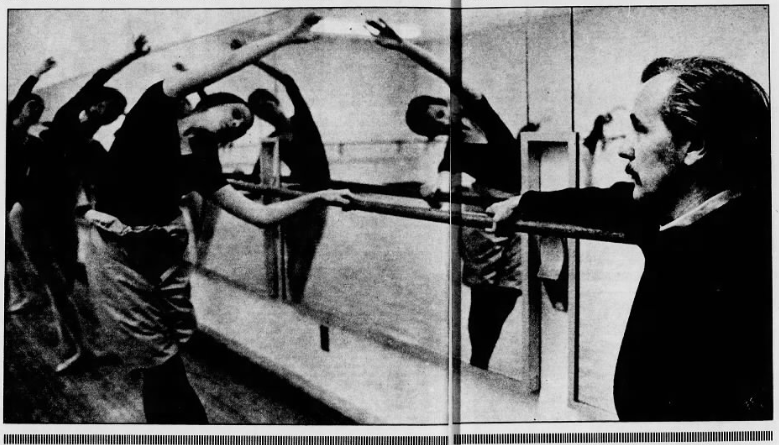
George Verdak teaching at Butler University.

Verdak's productions included the first performances in America of Offenbach's Le Papillion, Adam's Le Diable a Quatre and La Jolie Fille du Gand. He choreographed a version of Cinderella that has been performed in America as recently as 2017.

In the 1960s, he choreographed performances at Butler University, including a performance of Tchaikovsky's Romeo and Juliet. He directed the university ballet's performance at Malabar High School in Mansfield, Ohio, in 1968. The program included an excerpt from Igor Stravinsky's Pulcinella known as "Pergolesiana", an original dance called Three Todays, and the third act from the ballet Raymonda.

In the 1970s he choreographed and designed productions for the annual Romantic Music Festival at Butler University, including three ballet productions in 1970 and a performance of Raymonda in 1973. In 1977, he directed a performance for the Indianapolis Ballet Theatre of selections from The Nutcracker and Sleeping Beauty at McHale Auditorium in Logansport, Indiana.

== Death and legacy ==
Verdak died on September 15, 1993, at the age of age 70.

The George Verdak Trust provides sets and scenery for ballets around the country. Verdak's own set work has been used as recently as 2018, and his choreography as recently as 2017.

Verdak's collection of ballet research and photographs, including about 900 pictures, has been displayed in art galleries and is now found in the L. Tom Perry Special Collections at Brigham Young University. His collection of costumes, sets, and other pieces from the Ballet Russe de Monte Carlo have been the source of a legal dispute between Verdak's heir and Butler University.
