= Lois Bewley =

American dancer and choreographer (1934–2012)

- Born: Lois Eleanor Bewley; October 19, 1934; Louisville, Kentucky
- Died: November 21, 2012 (aged 78); Manhattan, New York
- Education: School of American Ballet
- Occupations: Dancer, choreographer
- Years active: 1955–1980
- Dancing career
- Former groups: Ballet Russe de Monte-Carlo; American Ballet Theatre; Ballets USA; New York City Ballet; First Chamber Dance Quartet
- Dances: Pi R Squared

Lois Eleanor Bewley (October 19, 1934 – November 21, 2012) was an American dancer, choreographer and designer. She studied at the School of American Ballet before joining the Ballet Russe de Monte-Carlo. After touring with the American Ballet Theatre and the dance companies of Alicia Markova and Jerome Robbins, she joined the New York City Ballet in 1960. Regarded as the "clown princess of dance", she co-founded the First Chamber Dance Quartet and choreographed original ballets and dance pieces. She also worked as an opera director, costume designer and set designer.

== Early life and education ==
Lois Eleanor Bewley was born on October 19, 1934, in Louisville, Kentucky. She graduated from Atherton High School. She moved to New York briefly at the age of 17 before returning to Kentucky. She attended the University of Louisville for a year before returning to New York. She studied at the School of American Ballet where Muriel Stuart was among her instructors.

== Career ==
Early in her career, Bewley performed as a soloist with the Ballet Russe de Monte-Carlo, from around 1955 to 1957. She then toured Europe with the American Ballet Theatre. In 1958 she worked with the touring company of Alicia Markova and then with Jerome Robbins's dance company Ballets USA. She was in the 1959 Broadway musical First Impressions.

Bewley joined the New York City Ballet in 1960. During her time with the ballet, she performed works by George Balanchine and Jerome Robbins. She was praised for her performances in the Todd Bolender comic ballets Creation of the World and Souvenirs.

Bewley performed in Puerto Rico at the 1960 Pablo Casals Festival as part of a trio of New York City Ballet dancers that included William Carter and Charles Bennett. The three joined with Nadine Ravine to co-found the First Chamber Dance Quartet. The focus of the quartet was dances that its members had created. Among Bewley's earliest works was Pi R Squared, an original piece that parodied the choreographic style of George Balanchine and was well received in New York in 1961. Dance critic Allen Hughes called it "brief but devastating". Bewley choreographed a total of 14 ballets for the First Chamber Dance Quartet, including the 1964 piece Part II, which was a sequel to Pi R Squared. Bewley choreographed short skits in her 1968 work Visions Fugitives, set to Sergei Prokofiev's music.

Bewley was called the "clown princess of dance". New York Times dance critic Anna Kisselgoff, wrote in 1976 that Bewley "might be regarded as one of dance's finest comediennes".

In 1972, Bewley directed the U.S. premiere of the Carl Nielsen opera Maskarade. She was also the choreographer, costume designer, and a dancer in the St. Paul Opera production. She was also a costume designer for the 1972 production of Léonide Massine's Le Beau Danube by Joffrey Ballet. She was the choreographer, set and costume designer for the ballet Children of Darkness, which was based on the Brontë novel Wuthering Heights. The work premiered in 1973 with the Pennsylvania Ballet. Bewley performed as Catherine, the lead role in the ballet and her photography of the Yorkshire moors was used for the set design.

By 1976, she had begun performing solo recitals in New York. She designed and performed 10 separate ballets. Her mid-1970s solo dance performance at the 92nd Street Y, The Return of Lois Bewley used music from Leon Kirchner and Frederick Jacobi.

Following her 1980 retirement from ballet, Bewley designed streetwear. She also created pastel portraits of pets. Bewley died from a stroke on November 21, 2012, in Manhattan.
