= Gaîté Parisienne =

1938 ballet

- Choreographer: Léonide Massine
- Music: Jacques Offenbach; Manuel Rosenthal (orchestration); Jacques Brindejont-Offenbach (orchestration)
- Libretto: Comte Étienne de Beaumont
- Premiere: 5 April 1938; Théâtre de Monte Carlo, Monte Carlo, Monaco
- Original ballet company: Ballet Russe de Monte Carlo
- Characters: Glove Seller; Flower Girl; La Lionne; The Baron; The Officer; The Peruvian
- Design: Comte Étienne de Beaumont (décor); Barbara Karinska (costumes)
- Setting: Paris

Gaîté Parisienne (lit. 'Parisian Gaiety') is a 1938 ballet choreographed by Léonide Massine (1896–1979) to music by Jacques Offenbach (1819–1880) arranged and orchestrated many decades later by Manuel Rosenthal (1904–2003) in collaboration with Jacques Brindejont-Offenbach, the composer's grandson. With a libretto and décor by Comte Étienne de Beaumont and costumes executed by Barbara Karinska, it was first presented by the Ballet Russe de Monte-Carlo at the Théâtre de Monte Carlo on 5 April 1938.

== Synopsis ==
Performed in one act, the ballet does not have a conventional narrative. Instead, it depicts the amorous flirtations, convivial dancing, and high spirits of a diverse group of people who patronize a fashionable Paris café one evening during the period of the Second Empire (1851–1870). Members of various social classes are among the participants.

As the curtain opens, four waiters and four cleaning women are preparing the room for the evening's entertainment. They dance a merry dance before the doors are opened to the public. The first to arrive is a pretty Flower Girl, who has come to sell her nosegays to the customers. She dances happily with the waiters, flouncing her skirts and petticoats, as the charladies depart. Next to enter is a gaggle of six cocodettes, flighty young women of questionable virtue, with three billiards players as their escorts. The group dances about the room in a rousing mazurka. At its conclusion, a glamorous Glove Seller appears in the doorway and waltzes into the room, charming everyone there. A change of music announces the arrival of a wealthy Peruvian tourist, who enters in a state of high excitement. Bearing two carpetbags, he is so eager to join the Parisian nightlife that he has not stopped to deposit his luggage. The cocodettes are interested in him, and in his apparent wealth, but he is attracted to the Glove Seller. Next, to the strains of a swelling waltz, a handsome Baron enters. He is welcomed by the Flower Girl, but he is immediately captivated by the Glove Seller. When they dance together, they seem to form a perfect partnership. Drum beats and march music then signal the arrival of an Officer and a platoon of soldiers. On the lookout for girls, the soldiers engage the cocodettes and the Flower Girl in another dance. Suddenly, a fashionable society beauty, a courtesan known as La Lionne, arrives, accompanied by her escort, a Duke, and a companion, the Lady in Green. The room is now filled with people seeking an evening's diversion, entertainment, and, possibly, amorous adventure.

La Lionne, in a bright red ball gown, becomes the center of attraction. She vies for the attention of the Officer, who flirts with the Glove Seller, who contrives to make the Baron jealous by pretending to respond to the attention of the Peruvian. The Duke is disconcerted by the behavior of La Lionne, but he is also interested in the Glove Seller, and he joins the Officer, the Baron, and the Peruvian in wooing her in a vivacious pas de cinq, lifting her high above their heads and exposing her pretty legs. A quarrel develops among the four men and a fight breaks out. The Baron and the Glove Seller escape the mêlée, but almost everyone else joins in. After order is restored and everyone has left the room, the Baron and the Glove Seller return and dance an exuberant, romantic waltz, with aerial lifts and swooping turns. At its conclusion, a troupe of can-can dancers enters, led by a Dancing Master. They dance a lively can-can with the traditional high kicks, dizzying spins, whirling turns, and much display of ruffled skirts, black garters, and frothy white underthings. At the height of the ensuing merriment, everyone joins in a boisterous ballabile.

Thereafter, the mood softens; the lights dim, and to the strains of a gentle barcarole, everyone prepares to leave. Some of the guests pair off. La Lionne departs with the Officer, the Flower Girl leaves with the Duke, and others slowly drift out into the night. The Peruvian returns, expecting to find the Glove Seller waiting for him. Instead, he discovers her and the Baron in a passionate embrace. From the dusky doorway, they wave farewell to him as he is left alone in a spotlight, slumped over, drained of energy, disappointed by the outcome of the evening. The curtain closes.

== Original cast ==
At the premiere, the role of the Glove Seller was danced by Nina Tarakanova, the Flower Girl was Eugenia Delarova, and La Lionne was portrayed by Jeannette Lauret. Frederic Franklin took the part of the Baron, Igor Youskevitch was the Officer, and Massine himself danced the major comedy role of the Peruvian. Lubov Roudenko had a specially choreographed Can-Can routine, later reprising this for the 1941 film.

== History ==
Before the opening night, the ballet was advertised under the tentative titles of Gay Mabille and Tortoni, after a Paris café, but Manuel Rosenthal recalled that Count Étienne de Beaumont, the ballet's librettist, eventually came up with the title that was used at the premiere.

Massine had originally commissioned this ballet from Roger Désormière, but, owing to lack of time, he asked his friend Rosenthal to take on the commission. Initially not inclined to fulfill the assignment, Rosenthal reportedly said, "I don't know Offenbach well; I'm not used to orchestrating the music of other people; I don't want to do it; I don't know Miasine [Massine]". However, Désormière was insistent enough that Rosenthal eventually accepted the task.

With advice from Nadia Boulanger, Massine directed Rosenthal's selection of the Offenbach excerpts. After completion of the score, Massine was unsure about it and was inclined to reject it. Rosenthal then proposed that Igor Stravinsky act as arbitrator over the acceptance of the score, to which Massine agreed. Upon hearing the music, Stravinsky strongly advised Massine to accept Rosenthal's arrangements. However, because of the poor relations between Massine and Rosenthal, Rosenthal himself did not conduct the first performance of the ballet, and instead Efrem Kurtz was conductor for the ballet's premiere. Jean-Claude Yon considers the ballet music as the culmination of the practice of adaptations and pasticcios running through the period of relative neglect of the composer between the two wars "written in a spirit foreign to Offenbach" which continued for many years "to impose its deformed vision" of the composer.

Gaîté Parisienne was first presented in the United States by the Ballet Russe de Monte Carlo at the Metropolitan Opera House, New York, on 12 October 1938, with Alexandra Danilova as the Glove Seller and Delarova, Lauret, Franklin, Youskevitch, and Massine in the same roles they had danced at the premiere in Monte Carlo. Danilova, who had shared the role of the Glove Seller with Tarakanova in Europe, became indelibly associated with the role in America. Unlike Tarakanova, who had played the Glove Seller as demure and naive, Danilova portrayed her as a vivacious, glamorous, sophisticated woman of the world. As Jack Anderson wrote in The One and Only, "Danilova in Gaîté became one of the attractions of the Ballet Russe, and the ballet often concluded a season's opening-night performance. On the opening night of the company's 1941 season in New York, when Danilova made her first entrance she was given a spontaneous ovation that stopped the show. Such show-stopping ovations thenceforth became a tradition of every opening-night Gaîté with Danilova."

The charming role of the Flower Girl was choreographed especially to suit the talents and abilities of Eugenia Delarova, Massine's second wife, and she was ideally suited to its exuberant lyricism. Frederic Franklin, young, blond, and handsome, was perfectly cast as the Baron and was long known for that role. Jeannette Lauret, a statuesque dancer with sparkling eyes, was also particularly admired as La Lionne, which she performed many times. After Massine left the Ballet Russe de Monte Carlo in 1943, Leon Danielian eventually inherited the role of the Peruvian and became closely identified with it. Over time, he altered the original choreography to suit his personal style and was much admired in the role.

Other productions of Massine's Gaîté Parisienne were mounted by the Royal Swedish Ballet (1956), American Ballet Theatre (1970), London Festival Ballet (1973), and Les Ballets de Monte Carlo (1989). Lorca Massine staged a revival of his father's ballet for American Ballet Theatre in 1988, with cartoonish sets by Zack Brown and extravagantly patterned and colorful costumes by French fashion designer Christian Lacroix. The production was not a success and was performed only sporadically until 1999, when it was dropped from the repertory. It returned for a few performances in 2014 during the company's New York season, once again meeting with only a tepid response from audiences and critics.

== Order of numbers ==
- 1. Ouverture (from: La vie parisienne)
- 2. Allegro moderato (from: Mesdames de la Halle)
- 3. Polka (from: Le voyage dans la lune)
- 4. Landler (from: Lieschen et Fritzchen)
- 5. Mazurka (from: Vert-Vert)
- 6. Valse (from: La vie parisienne)
- 7. Entrée du Brésilen (from: La vie parisienne)
- 8. Polka (from: La belle Hélène)
- 9. Valse (from: Orpheus in the Underworld)
- 10. Marche (from: Tromb-al-Cazar)
- 11. Valse (from: La belle Hélène)
- 12. Entrée du Brésilien (from: La vie parisienne)
- 13. Valse (from: Les contes d'Hoffmann)
- 14. Duel (from: Le voyage dans la lune)
- 15. Valse (from: La Périchole)
- 16. Prelude au Can-Can (from: Orpheus in the Underworld)
- 17. Can-Can Scene 1 (from: Orpheus in the Underworld, Robinson Crusoe)
- 18. Can-Can Scene 2 - Polka (from: Orpheus in the Underworld)
- 19. Can-Can Scene 3 (potpourri)

== Recordings ==
The full ballet, as well as a concert suite, has been frequently performed and recorded. Efrem Kurtz, who conducted the world premiere, recorded some of the music for Columbia Records on 78-rpm discs. In 1947, Arthur Fiedler and the Boston Pops Orchestra recorded the ballet for RCA Victor; this high fidelity recording was later issued by RCA as its first 33-1/3 rpm LP in 1950. In 1954, Fiedler recorded the concert suite in stereo, his first stereophonic session for RCA. Charles Munch also recorded the ballet for Decca as part of the Phase 4 Stereo series, as did Leonard Bernstein for Columbia. René Leibowitz and the London Philharmonic recorded it in stereo for Urania. Rosenthal himself made four recordings of the ballet.

In 1941, Warner Brothers produced a Technicolor film version of the Ballet Russe de Monte Carlo production of Gaîté Parisienne that it released in 1942, under the title The Gay Parisian. Directed by Jean Negulesco, it departs considerably from the original scenario of the ballet. The unit set, which was designed to conform to Hollywood's idea of elegant architecture, including a typical "stairway to nowhere", bears no resemblance to a room in a Parisian nightclub or café of the Second Empire. Many costumes were redesigned to be somewhat more modest than those seen on the ballet stage, but they were realized in startlingly garish colors to take advantage of the Technicolor process. Further, Massine cut much of his choreography to achieve the desired twenty-minute length and restaged what was left for the movie camera. The result was to focus the work on the role of the Peruvian, played by himself. Besides the loss of some of the most entertaining dances, his changes also obscured the relationships of the characters. The cast also includes Frederic Franklin as the Baron, Nathalie Krassovska as the Flower Girl, Igor Youskevitch as the Officer, and André Eglevsky as the Dancing Master. The film is commercially available only in a "short subjects gallery" as a bonus feature on the "three-disc special edition" of The Maltese Falcon issued in 2006 by Warner Home Video.

In 1954, Victor Jessen created a black-and-white film of Gaîté Parisienne by laboriously splicing together strips of film he had surreptitiously recorded in theaters during performances by Ballet Russe de Monte Carlo over a ten-year period (1944–1954) and then editing the footage to conform to a sound recording he had also secretly made during a performance sometime around 1954. The synchronization of sound and picture is not exact. Issued on DVD in 2006 by Video Artists International, the film stars Danilova as the Glove Seller, Franklin as the Baron, and Leon Danielian as the Peruvian. Featured performers are Tatiana Grantzeva as the Flower Girl, Robert Lindgren as the Officer, Shirley Haynes as La Lionne, Peter Deign as the Duke, Harding Dorn as the Dancing Master, and Moscelyne Larkin and Gertrude Tyven as the lead can-can girl. Optional features include audio commentary by Frederic Franklin and explanatory English subtitles.
