= Les Présages =

Les Présages is a ballet choreographed by Léonide Massine to music from Tchaikovsky's Symphony No. 5, with sets and costumes by André Masson. The premiere was performed on 13 April 1933 at the Opéra de Monte Carlo by the Ballets Russes de Monte-Carlo.

The ballet was Massine's first experiment with a plotless work based on symphonic music.

== Sources ==
- Leslie Norton, 2004: Léonide Massine and the 20th Century Ballet, p. 147-154. McFarland ISBN 0786417528
