= Luba Marks =

Fashion designer (1921–2020)

- Born: Lubou Rodenko; November 28, 1921; Sofia, Bulgaria
- Died: July 5, 2020 (aged 98); Southampton, New York
- Other names: Lubov Roudenko; Luba Rudenko; Luba Begazy
- Labels: Elite Juniors; Luba for Elite; Elite III by Luba
- Awards: Coty Award, 1968

Luba Marks (November 28, 1921 – July 5, 2020) was a Bulgarian-born French-American fashion designer of Russian descent specializing in sportswear from the 1950s to the 1980s. Prior to this, under the name Lubov Roudenko, she was a soloist for the Ballet Russe de Monte Carlo in the late 1930s and early 1940s, afterwards performing on Broadway throughout the 1940s.

== Early life ==
Lubou Rodenko was born on 28 November 1921 in Sofia, Bulgaria, to Russian parents. Her father, Nicholas, had been an officer in the Russian Imperial Guard, and following the Russian Revolution, he and his wife became refugees while the rest of their family were killed. They moved to Paris, where Nicholas Rodenko ran a Russian restaurant until it was forced to close following the 1932 assassination of President Paul Doumer by a Russian émigré. Following this, the family relied on Luba's skill as a dancer to help them, with Luba later recollecting "There were times when I had to win first place in a contest so we could eat."

== Dancing ==
In 1938 Rodenko was signed up to the Ballet Russe de Monte Carlo, where, at 17, she was their youngest soloist. Her stage name was Lubov Roudenko, and she was also popularly known as "Spitfire Lu-Lu." She had a can-can sequence in the 1938 ballet Gaîté Parisienne choreographed specially for her by Léonide Massine. She would later reprise this role in the 1941 Oscar-nominated short film The Gay Parisian. Whilst with the Ballets Russes, Rodenko was the subject of several drawings by Henri Matisse in 1939. Four of his portrait sketches of her are now in the Fogg Museum. Matisse also made a drawing of Rodenko in the ballet Rouge et Noir. While on tour with the Ballet Russe, Rodenko performed the role of the Cowgirl in the 1942 ballet Rodeo until the tour reached New York and Agnes de Mille, the original choreographer, reclaimed the role for herself. Disappointed by this, Rodenko quit the Ballets Russes, and took a better-paid job performing in a Broadway production of The Merry Widow. This production launched at the Majestic Theatre on 4 August 1943, with Rodenko and James Starbuck leading the character dances, including a comic polka and a can-can number. After this, Rodenko played Grisette in Nellie Bly, a short-lived 1946 musical based on the life of Nellie Bly, and then became a lead dancer for the 1946–1949 Broadway production of Annie Get Your Gun, but following a knee injury, decided to pursue a career in fashion design. She continued performing until 1951, appearing in the 1950–1951 Olsen and Johnson revue Pardon our French.

== Fashion ==
Luba and her first husband, Richard Marks, a manufacturer of coats and suits, launched their new clothing company Elite Juniors, in 1957. Elite Jrs. was a middle-range firm producing high-style coats, suits and separates for a fifth of the expected price. Luba first caught the attention of the fashion press by successfully reinterpreting the classic Chanel suit for ready-to-wear. Her designs were cut slim-fitting, with narrow sleeves and no bust darts, meaning that her designs looked more elegant and desirably Parisian than those of her rivals in the ready-to-wear field. Luba was also noted as an early promoter of the woman's pantsuit in America, dedicating over half of her 1966 collection to this look. It was noted that some of her pantsuit designs came out before Yves Saint Laurent produced his own very similar designs.

In 1968, alongside George Halley, Luba Marks won the Coty Award for her womenswear. At the time it was reported that her clothes were worn by smart young women such as actress Jill St. John and singer Petula Clark, and younger women in politics such as Luci Nugent. Luba noted that her clientele's age range ran from 16 to 70.

By 1976 Elite Juniors had been acquired by Peabody House, and despite their marriage having broken down, the Markses were still working together successfully. That year Luba predicted that the business would turn over 7 to 8 million dollars, forecasting that this would rise to 12 million. She was still working in 1984, selling her coats and other designs through Bullock's and describing herself as trying to continue offering originality.

== Personal life ==
Luba married her first husband, Richard Marks in 1948. Although the marriage eventually broke down and ended in divorce, the Markses continued to work together well into the 1970s. In September 1972, Luba met her second husband, George Begazy, soon after the completion of her home in Southampton, New York, which she had designed herself.

Luba Begazy died at home on 5 July 2020, aged 98.
