= Mia Slavenska =

Croatian-American ballet dancer

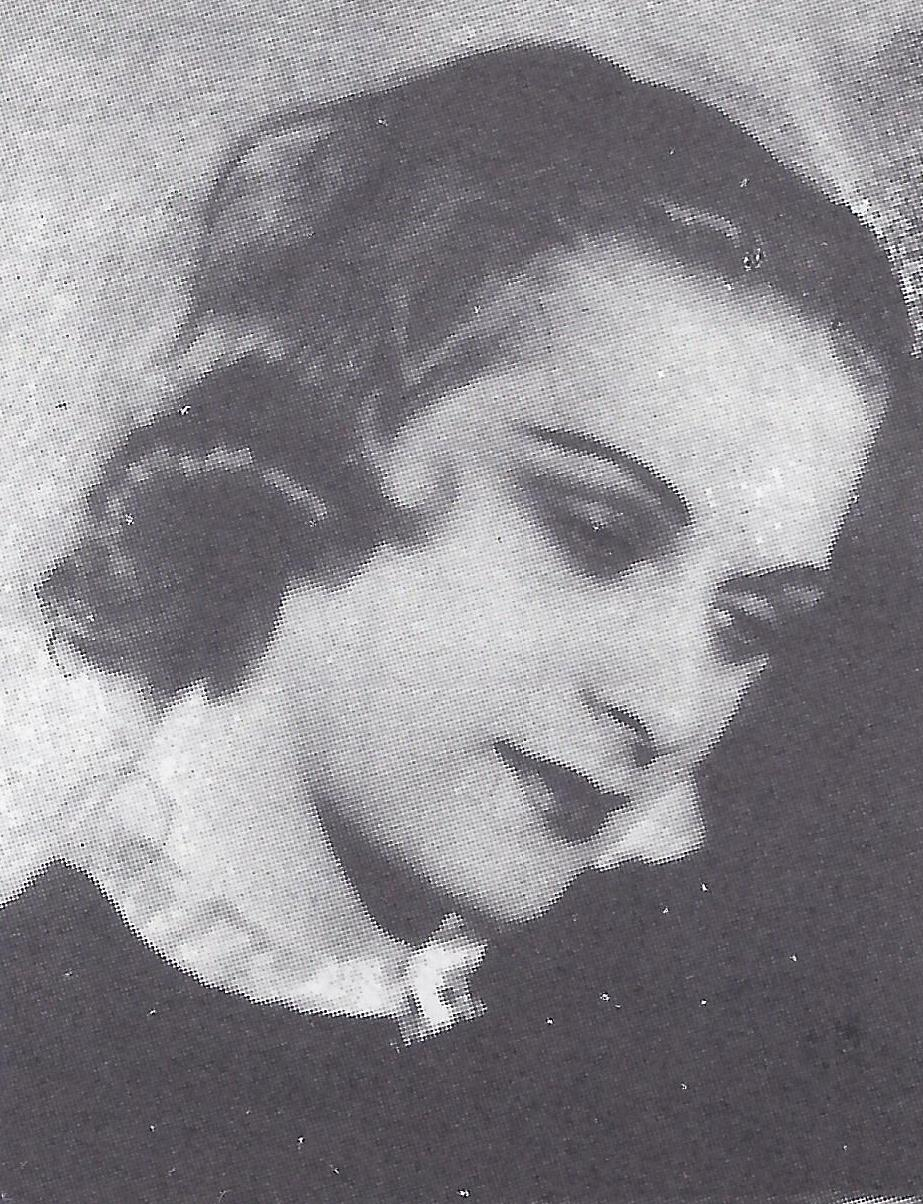
Mia Čorak

Mia Slavenska (née Čorak; 20 February 1916 – 5 October 2002) was a Croatian-American soloist of the Ballet Russe de Monte-Carlo in 1938–1952 and 1954–1955.

== Biography ==
Mia was born in Slavonski Brod in the Croatian family of the pharmacist Milan Čorak and his wife, housewife Gedwiga Čorak. When their daughter was one year old, the family moved to Zagreb. There Mia studied ballet at the "Josephine Weiss school" and the Russian émigré, ballerina of the Bolshoi Theater and Diaghilev's Russian Seasons Margarita Froman. Taking the stage from the age of five, at the age of sixteen she became the prima ballerina of the ballet troupe of the HNK in Zagreb. For some time she studied in Vienna with Leo Dubois. Due to the royalist dictatorship of the Kingdom of Yugoslavia under a Serbian monarchy, she was banned from performing in her native Croatia which prompted her and her mother to relocate to Berlin in 1935. One year later, she would perform to great acclaim at the 1936 Berlin Dance Olympics. Her mother enrolled her under a new pseudoyn, Mia Slavenska, where the Croatian dancers were legally bound to perform under the banner of Yugoslavia. Despite the prestige of winning the event, the Kingdom of Yugoslavia continued to refuse her to dance in her Croatian homeland.

Having moved to Paris in 1937, in the same year she starred in two films - with Marcel L'Herbier in "Nights of Fire" and with Jean Benoit-Levy and Marie Epstein in "The Dying Swan".

She studied with Bronislava Nijinska and other Russian teachers. In 1938 she entered the Russian Ballet of Monte Carlo. Together with ballerinas Markova, Danilova and Tumanova she was the leading ballerina of the troupe.

In 1944, she organized her own troupe Ballet Variante in Hollywood, which existed for some time. In the early 1950s (1952), when the Monte Carlo Ballet ceased operations, together with Frederic Franklin organized the Slavenska Franklin Ballet Company, which existed for three years and closed for economic reasons. Their most significant production was the ballet A Streetcar Named Desire, based on the play of the same name by Tennessee Williams (1952, choreographer Valerie Bettis, Her Majesty's Theater, Montreal), in which Mia played the role of Blanche Dubois.

After Franklin, at the request of the impresario Serge Denhem, reassembled the troupe of the Russian Ballets, she danced there for a while, until Denhem began to vigorously promote Nina Novak. In the second half of the 1950s she danced at the London Festival Ballet with Anton Dolin and Alicia Markova.

Among the partners were Oleg Tupin, Frederic Franklin and Milorad Mišković, with whom she was a famous ballet couple of that time.

Mia Čorak was married to Dr. K. Neumann. She died in Los Angeles on 5 October 2002.

Her cremated ashes are interred at the Mirogoj Cemetery in Zagreb. Video footage of the Roman Catholic procession for her funeral can be seen in the documentary created by her daughter titled "Mia: A Dancer's Journey".

== Pedagogical activity ==
In 1938, while the Russian Ballet of Monte Carlo was touring California, she opened her own ballet studio in Los Angeles. There, among her students were sisters Maria and Marjorie Tallchief. After the war (since 1960) she had a small studio in New York, where Lucinda Childs was among her students. The latter called Slavenska “a wonderful teacher of the Russian school”, who “dealt with us seriously, was strict and demanded that we exactly follow her instructions”. After moving to Los Angeles, she taught at the University of California, Los Angeles (1969-1983) and at the private higher learning visual and performing arts California Institute of the Arts (1970-1984).

She also directed the Texas Fort Worth Civic Ballet for three years.

== Ballet career ==
A dancer since the age of four, she studied in Zagreb under Josephine Weiss and made her debut in Baranović's ballet Licitarsko srce in 1924, at what is today the Croatian National Theatre. She became the prima ballerina of the Zagreb Opera at the age of 17. At the 1936 Berlin dance Olympics, coinciding with the Olympic games, she won the choreography and dance award. She left Zagreb for Vienna, where she danced under L. Dubois, G. Krauss and L. von Weiden; and Paris under Lubov Egorova, Mathilde Kschessinska and Olga Preobrajenska.

For many years she was the leading ballerina of the famous Ballet Russe de Monte Carlo and with whom she moved to U.S. in the outset of the World War II. In France she started working on film. After appearing in Jean Benoit-Levy's film Ballerina (1937) and promoting it in the U.S., she remained there as a teacher and dancer. She became an American citizen in 1947.

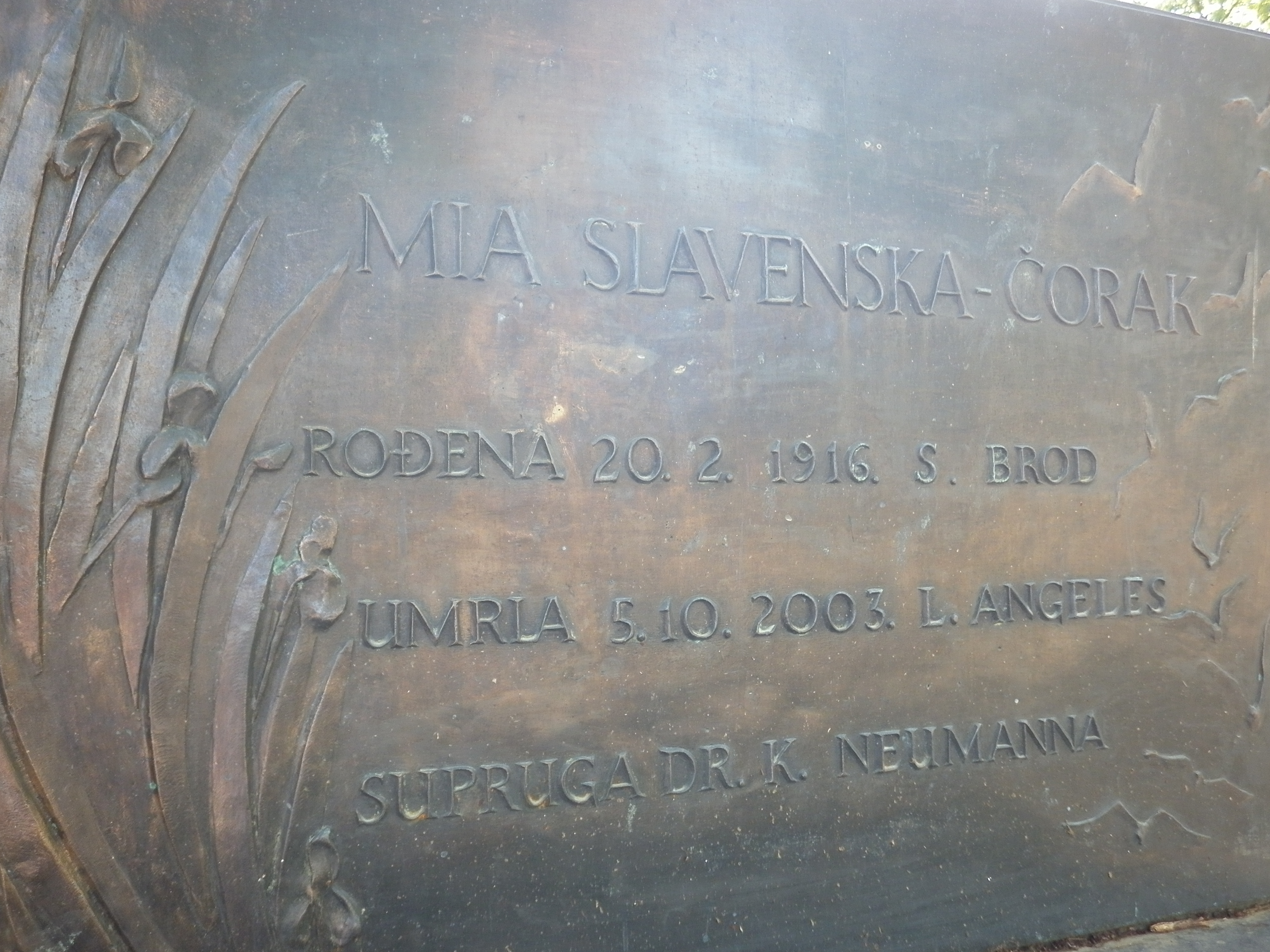
Mirogoj Cemetery, part of cemetery for Serbian Orthodox people, Zagreb

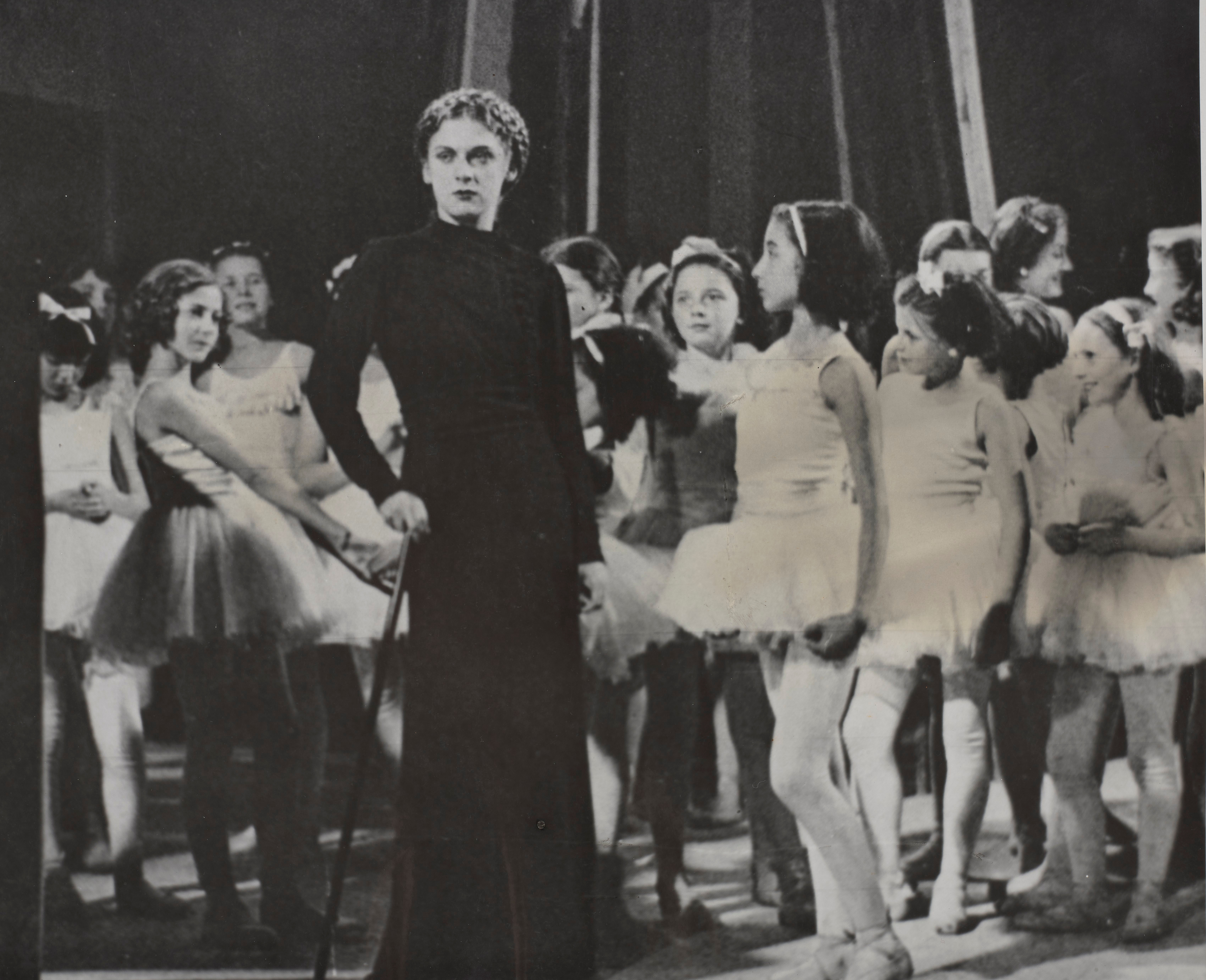
Mia Slavenska

== See also ==
- Nuits de feu (1937)
