= Leon Danielian =

American ballet dancer and choreographer

- Born: October 31, 1920; New York, New York, United States
- Died: March 8, 1997 (aged 76); Canaan, Connecticut, USA
- Occupation(s): ballet, dancer, choreographer
- Known for: Gaite Parisienne

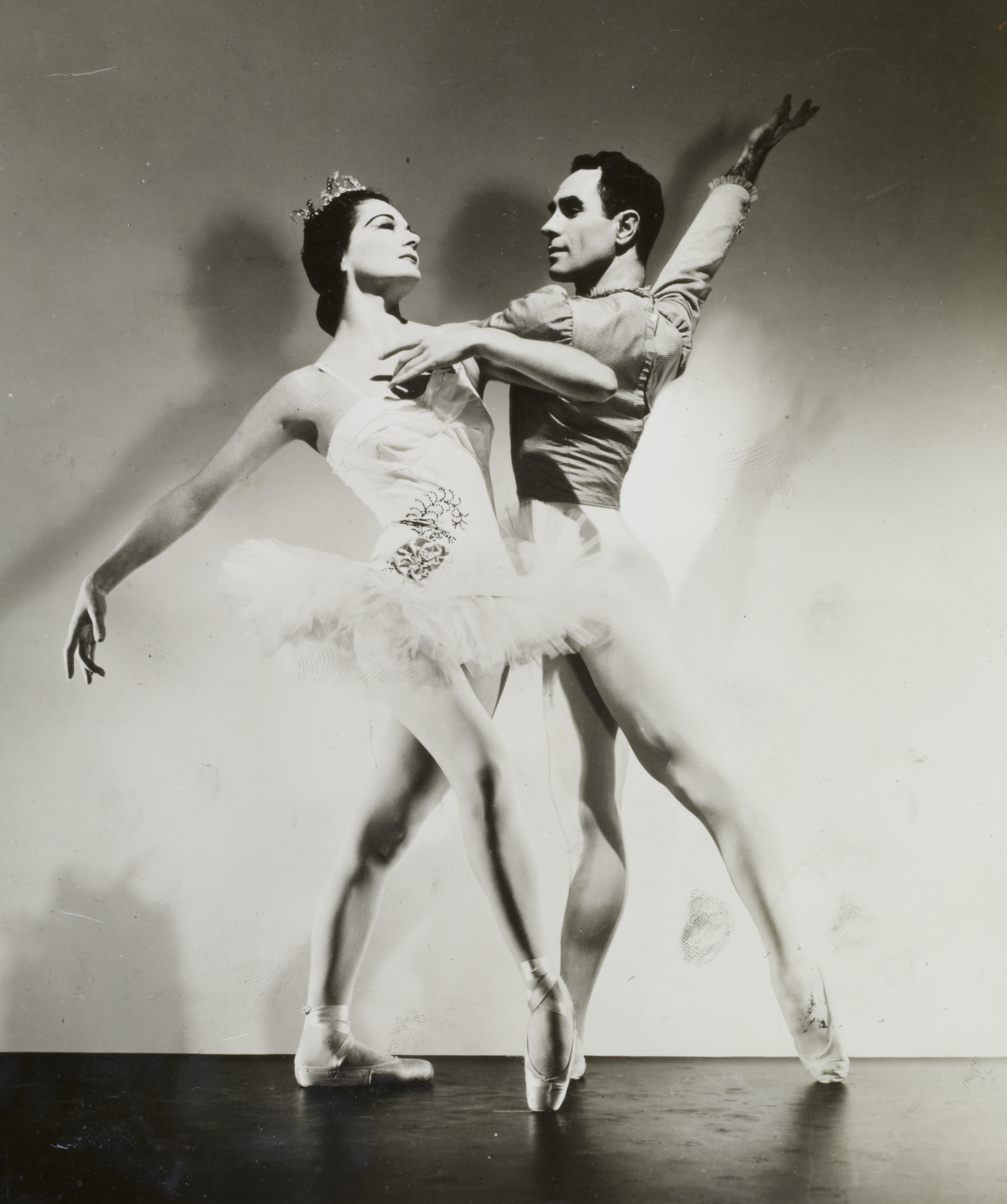
Leon Danielian and Jocelyn Vollmar, 1958. Brazilian National Archives.

Leon Danielian (31 October 1920 – 8 March 1997) was an American ballet dancer, choreographer, and educator. As a guest artist with ballet companies around the world, he became one of the first American male dancers to achieve international recognition.

== Early life and career ==
Leon Danielian, born in New York City, was the son of Armenian immigrants Frank and Varsik (Coolidganian) Danielian. As a child, he took private ballet classes with Madame Seda Suny, a well-known Armenian dance teacher, and later continued his studies under Mikhail Mordkin, Michel Fokine, Igor Schwezoff, and Vecheslav Swoboda. He made his debut with the Mordkin Ballet in 1937, became a charter member of Ballet Theatre in 1939, and appeared, briefly, with Colonel Wassily de Basil's Original Ballet Russe in 1941. He also danced in Broadway musicals during these early years. In 1943 he joined Ballet Russe de Monte Carlo as a soloist and remained with that company until 1961, having become a premier danseur with an unusually wide repertory. Admired for his classical technique as well as his gift for comedy, he made many guest appearances with other companies, among them Les Ballets de Champs-Élysées, as partner to Yvette Chauviré, and San Francisco Ballet, which toured internationally.

== Technique and style ==
Danielian was a virtuoso dancer, possessing a buoyant technique and a noble carriage in princely roles in classic ballets. His clean, incisive batterie (jumps in which the feet quickly cross and the legs beat together) made him an ideal performer of such sparkling roles as the Bluebird in The Sleeping Beauty as well as showpiece solos in Swan Lake and Raymonda. He often partnered ballerina Ruthanna Boris, having originated bravura roles in her ballets Cirque de Deux (1947) and Quelques Fleurs (1948). In 1949, in recognition of his classical technique and strong stage presence, Danielian was the recipient of the Dance Magazine Award for best male dancer of the 1948–1949 season.

With a ready wit and mischievous sense of humor, Danielian also excelled in demi-caractère roles such as Harlequin in Le Carnaval, the Blackamoor in Night Shadow, the First Cadet in Graduation Ball, and, especially, the Peruvian in Gaîté Parisienne. After Léonide Massine left the Ballet Russe de Monte Carlo in 1943, Danielian inherited the role of the excited Peruvian tourist and became closely identified with it. Over time he altered the original choreography to suit his personal style and invented new mannerisms for comic effect, virtually re-creating the character. He was much admired in the role and was said by many to have exceeded the characterization of the originator.

While still performing with Ballet Russe, Danielian turned his attention to choreography and made three ballets for the company: Sombreros (1956), set to Mexican folk tunes orchestrated by Ivan Boutnikoff; The Mazurka (1957), to music by Chopin, Tchaikovsky, and Strauss, arranged by Boutnikoff; and Espaňa (1961), to music by Breton, Chapel, and Granados. All three were lighthearted works with inventive choreography requiring both technical brilliance and comedic flair from their dancers, characteristics of Danielian's own performing style.

== Later life and career ==
In his late thirties, debilitated by arthritis, Danielian gave up performing and devoted himself to teaching. He taught technique classes, men's classes, and partnering classes at the Ballet Russe School in New York in the early 1960s, and from 1968 to 1980 he was director of American Ballet Theatre School. There he not only taught classes but was an effective leader of the faculty and administrator of the school. In 1982 he became director of the dance program at the University of Texas at Austin, where he was named a professor of fine arts. Although he had never graduated from high school, he prized learning and was well versed in art, theater, and dance history. He thus fit very well in a university setting. Although he suffered from the effects of a hip replacement, a heart operation, and a stroke in his later years, he continued teaching until his retirement in 1991. A dance studio at the university is named in his honor.
