= Josephine Weiss =

Austrian ballet dancer and dance troupe leader (1805–1852)

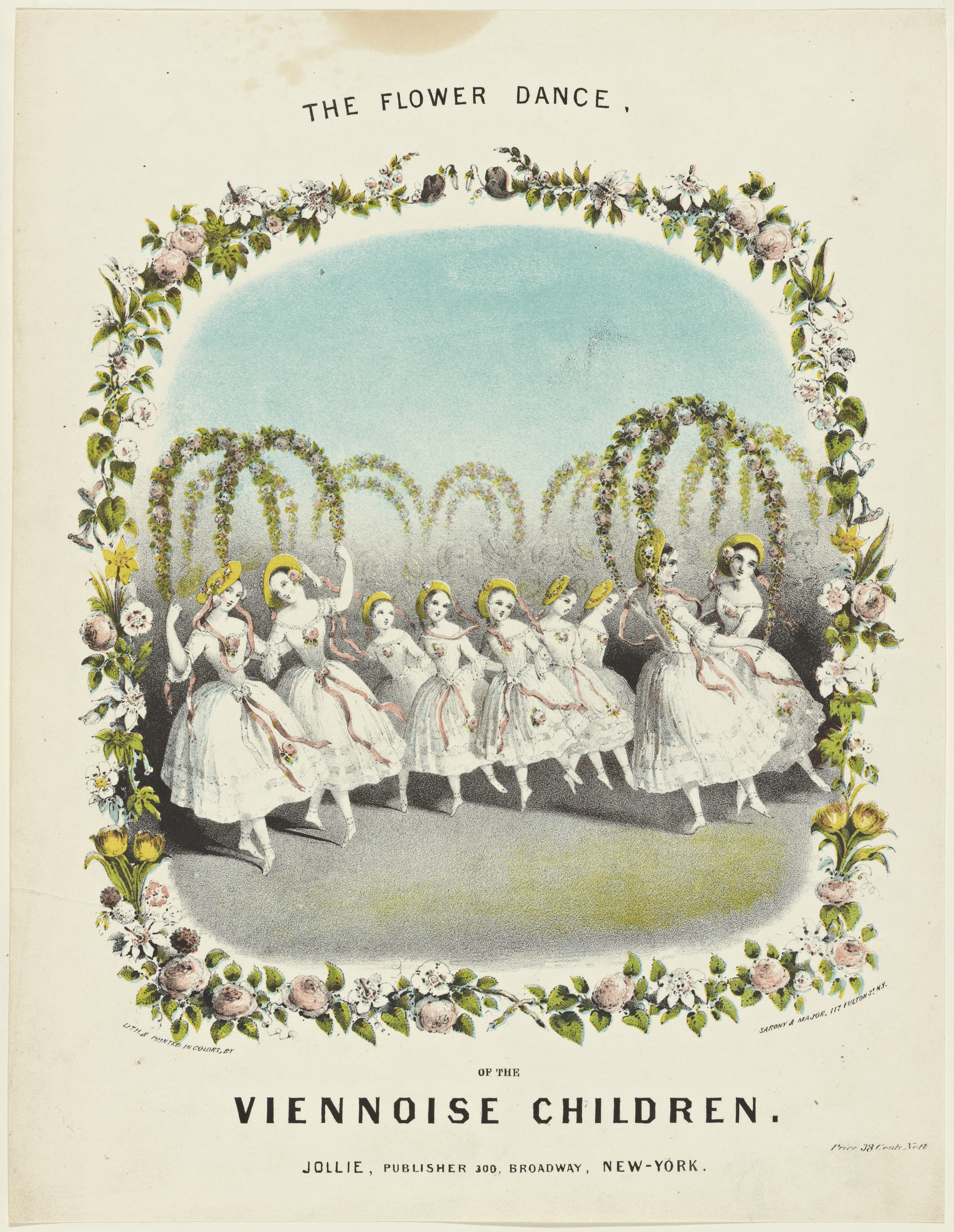
The Flower dance of the Danseuses Viennoises (1846)

Josephine Weiss (1805 – 1852) was an Austrian ballet dancer and dance troupe leader who travelled Europe and the United States with her team of young girls, Les Danseuses Viennoises ("the Viennoise Children").

== Early life ==
Weiss was born in Austria in 1805. She spent much of her early life dancing for various Austrian ballet companies, including the Kärntnertor Theater in Vienna, where she was a soloist from 1820 to 1826. Whilst there, she met and married Eduard Weiss, a comic actor.

== Career ==
By 1844, Weiss had been appointed as a ballet mistress for the Josephsstädter Theater and had formed her own troupe of young girls – Les Danseuses Viennoises. The dancers were aged between five and twelve years old, and under the guidance of Weiss the troupe toured Europe widely, and were even watched by Queen Victoria in London. In November and December 1844, the troupe performed at The Royal Dutch Theatre at The Hague in the Netherlands, however local newspapers expressed concern that such young children were being trained for stage performances.

In 1846, Weiss arranged a tour to the United States and on 22 September they boarded the SS Great Britain in Liverpool headed for New York. One day into the journey, however, the ship ran ashore in Dundrum Bay in Northern Ireland. Other passengers recalled the event in diaries, with one writing that ‘the Viennese children kept crying violently around Madame Weiss’. The troupe were collected by ships and returned to Liverpool the following day, where they were asked to perform at the Royal Adelphi Theater. The troupe eventually did make the journey to the United States, and performed in Philadelphia, New York City, St. Louis, Mobile and New Orleans between November 1846 and February 1847 under the name "the Viennoise Children". In April 1848 they performed a second season in St. Louis. On several occasions during preparations for performances in the south of the United States, it was noted by observers that Weiss was often angry with the children and swore at them in both German and English, causing some to approach her and ask her to moderate her language. In 1848, the troupe was closed down due to moral objections.

Later in her career, Weiss taught ballet at the National Ballet Theatre School in Zagreb.

== Death ==
Josephine Weiss died on 18 December 1852.
