= Ruthanna Boris =

American ballerina (1919–2007)

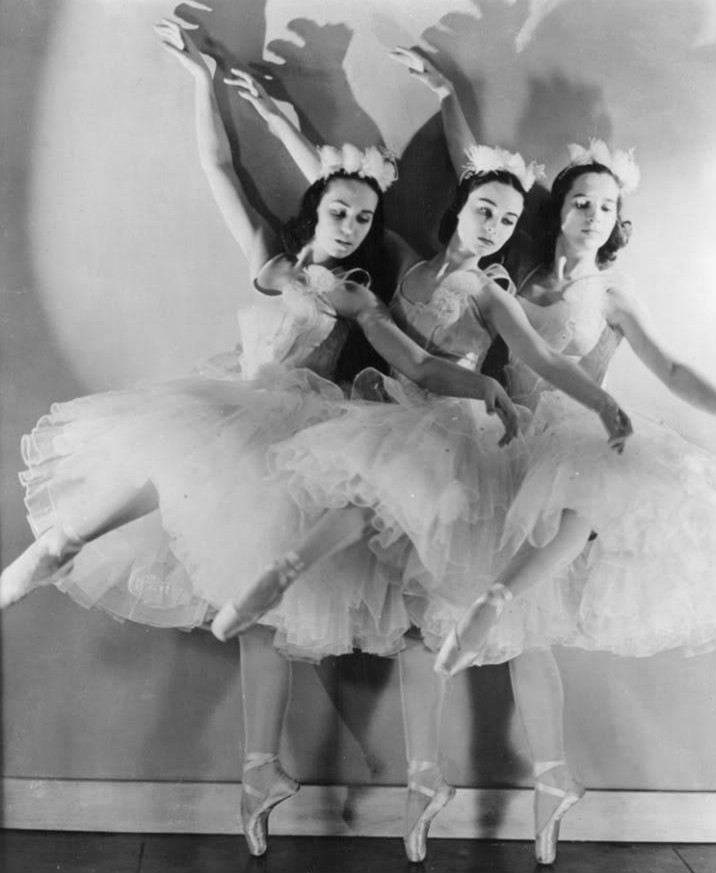
- Ballet Russe de Monte Carlo Nutcracker 1940
- Born: March 18, 1919; New York, New York, U.S.
- Died: January 5, 2007 (aged 87)
- Occupation: Ballerina

Ruthanna Boris (March 18, 1919 – January 5, 2007) was the first American Ballerina to star with the Ballet Russe de Monte Carlo troupes of the 1940s. She was born in Brooklyn. She was among the first students at George Balanchine and Lincoln Kirstein’s School of American Ballet when it opened in 1934. As a choreographer her ballets Cirque de Deux and Cakewalk, are often revived. She died in El Cerrito, California and her papers are held at Houghton Library, Harvard University.

== Ballerina ==
Boris studied ballet at the Metropolitan opera ballet school where she was in the ensemble in Balanchine's first American creation Serenade which premiered on June 10, 1934. An offshoot of the American Ballet was Lincoln Lincoln Kirstein's Ballet Caravan, created to encourage new choreographers, including Lew Christensen (who gave Boris the title role in Pocahontas), William Dollar, Erick Hawkins and Eugene Loring, who chose Boris for their creations. At the Metropolitan Opera she became a soloist and then leading dancer. In 1935 she appeared on Broadway in the ballet-musical Alma Mater, with Tamara Geva, choreography by George Balanchine, and music by Kay Swift. She danced with Paul Haakon in the Broadway musical Hooray for What (1937), music by Harold Arlen, scenic design by Vincente Minnelli, and music arranged by Kay Thompson. She danced in the Broadway musical The Straw Hat Revue (1939). Also in the cast were Imogene Coca, Danny Kaye and Jerome Robbins.

When she joined the Ballet Russe de Monte Carlo in 1943 she was given junior rank, with the preference being given to Russian dancers. Her status improved when Balanchine arrived as principle choreographer; he put her in Danses Concertantes, Night Shadow and Raymonda. She then became the first American to dance the classics. From there she danced in a variety of ballets from Swan Lake to Frankie and Johnny. She danced with the Ballet Russe de Monte Carlo from 1943 to 1950.

== Choreographer ==
In 1943, she choreographed the Broadway revival of Sigmund Romberg's The Student Prince. She choreographed Cirque de Deux (1947) for the Ballet Russe de Monte Carlo. In 1951 she joined the New York City Ballet. There she choreographed Cakewalk (1951), using costumes from a previous ballet, to music by Louis Moreau Gottschalk. Also for the NYCB she choreographed Kaleidoscope (1952), a suite of dances to Kabalevsky’s The Comedians, Bayou (1952) and Will o’ the Wisp (1953), about a naiad capturing a sleeping boy. In this she again used scenery and costumes from an earlier production. In 1956 she did the choreography for Le Jazz Hot and Pasticcio (plus designing those costumes), Roundelay, The Comedians, and The Wanderling. In 1976 she choreographed Ragtime, for the Houston Ballet, to music by Scott Joplin.

== Teacher ==
In 1956 Boris injured her hip. It required surgery. In 1956–57 she danced and led the Royal Winnipeg Ballet. In 1959 the hip injury led to degenerative arthritis, leading to more surgeries and the use of crutches, ending her dancing career. In 1965 she was asked to create a dance program at the University of Washington. Her first classes were held in the second floor of the UW Armory building. The lower floor was a shooting range for ROTC students. She kept cadence for the dancers with a drum. When the shooting noise grew louder, she would hit the drum harder. She taught ballet at the UW for 18 years. She helped design Meany Hall. It had three dance studios, changing rooms and showers. Hannah Wiley studied ballet with Boris. She took over as head of the dance department when Boris retired. Wiley said. “She was teaching dance in the academy when [administrators] were not sure where it was supposed to be. Ballet was in the drama department, and modern dance was in physical education.” Miss Boris helped elevate dance to the status of other studies, “and that was extremely important not only here but across the country,” Wiley said.
