= Allen Hughes (critic) =

American journalist

Allen Hughes (28 December 1921 – 16 November 2009) was an American dance and music critic.

Born in Brownsburg, Indiana, Hughes started his career as a critic in 1950 when he joined the staff of Musical America. In 1955, he became a music critic for The New York Herald Tribune. He left there in 1960 to join the staff of The New York Times where he worked as a music and dance critic until his retirement 26 years later in 1986. He was notably chief dance critic of the newspaper from 1963 to 1965 and was chief music editor of the Sunday Arts and Leisure section during the early 1980s. He died in Sarasota, Florida at the age of 87.
