= Igor Youskevitch =

Ukrainian-American ballet dancer and choreographer (1912–1994)

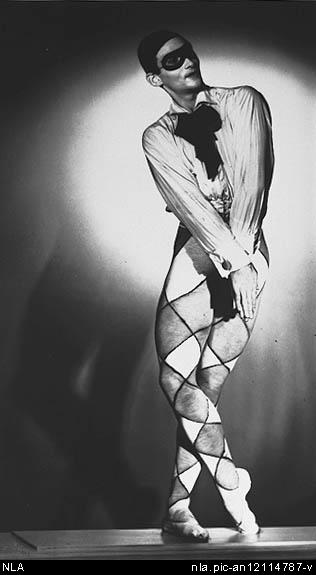
Igor Youskevitch in Le Carnaval, 1936–37. Photo by Max Dupain.

Igor Youskevitch (Russian: Игорь Юскевич, Ukrainian: Ігор Юскевич) (13 March 1912 – 13 June 1994) was a ballet dancer and a choreographer of Russian-Ukrainian origin, famous as one of the greatest male ballet dancers of the 20th century, as a master of the classic style, e.g., in Afternoon of a Faun, and as a dance partner to Alicia Alonso.

== Early years ==
Born in the village of Pyriatyn, Poltava Oblast, (then part of the Russian Empire, now Ukraine in central Ukraine), Youskevitch was the son of a judge. The family fled the Russian Revolution and in 1920 settled in Belgrade. Youskevitch was educated in Belgrade and graduated with a degree in engineering from Belgrade University.

He did not begin his ballet training until the age of twenty although prior to that he was active in a Slavic athletic organisation and received early training as a gymnast. In 1932, the Yugoslavian ballerina Zenia Grunt saw him at a tournament and persuaded him to take up dancing as a career. He came to dance relatively late in life, however, his talent led to rapid promotion, and in 1932 he made his first appearance on the Paris stage.

He studied first with Belgrade teacher Elena Poliakova. His later teachers included Olga Preobrajenska, Anatole Vilzak and Alexandra Fedorova. He studied ballet for an additional two years in Paris before joining Les Ballets de Paris. In 1937 he joined Le Ballet Russe de Monte Carlo under the direction of Leonid Massine as first dancer, touring with them in the late-1930s.

== Australia ==
Youskevitch came to Australia as a leading dancer with the Monte Carlo Russian Ballet on their 1936–1937 tour. He danced all the leading roles during the tour, scoring particular success with Helene Kirsova in Le Carnaval.

== United States ==
In 1944, Youskevitch joined the U.S. Navy and became an American citizen. After the war, he struggled to return to shape for dancing and began a successful career in the United States in 1946 by joining the American Ballet Theatre in New York. In the late 40s, he began to partner with Alicia Alonso, with whom he had his greatest renown.

He appeared in films and on television. His unique ability to blend athleticism with artistry is vividly captured in his aerialist sequences for Gene Kelly's pioneering 1956 ballet film Invitation to the Dance. Thereafter he returned to Le Ballet Russe de Monte Carlo as artistic director and dancer

He retired from dance in the 1960s, and operated a ballet school in New York with his wife, dancer Anna Scarpova, which he ran from 1962 to 1980. In 1971, he accepted an appointment to the dance program at the University of Texas at Austin, and remained there until 1982.

He was the artistic director of New York International Ballet Competition (NYIBC) from 1983 to 1994. In that capacity he enriched the dance world by teaching and inspiring the NYIBC dancers from all over the world, passing on the secrets of his art, acquired over many years.

His daughter, Maria Youskevitch, was also a dancer. She was a soloist with American Ballet Theatre and danced with Maryland Ballet. She currently teaches at the Martin Center for Dance in Lawrenceville, New Jersey.

== Obituaries ==
- NY Times, Jack Anderson, 14 June 1994

== Reviews ==
- NY Times, 18 November 1939, the Ballet Russe de Monte Carlo in Giselle
