= Frederic Franklin =

British-American ballet dancer and director (1914–2013)

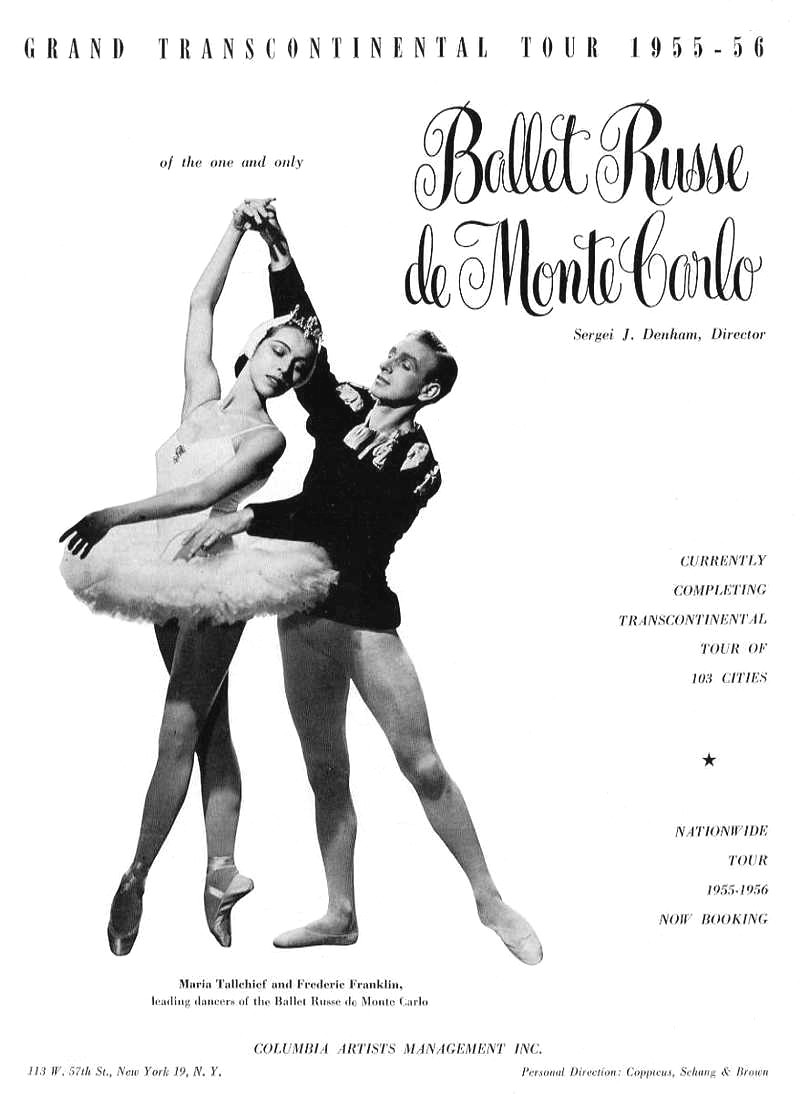
- Frederic Franklin and Maria Tallchief in a 1955 ad for the Ballet Russe de Monte Carlo.
- Born: 13 June 1914; Liverpool, England
- Died: 4 May 2013 (aged 98); New York City, NY, U.S
- Occupations: Ballet dancer, ballet director
- Spouse: William Haywood Ausman
- Relatives: John Franklin (brother)
- Awards: full list

Frederic Franklin CBE (13 June 1914 – 4 May 2013), sometimes also called "Freddie", was a British-American ballet dancer, choreographer and director.

== Dancer ==
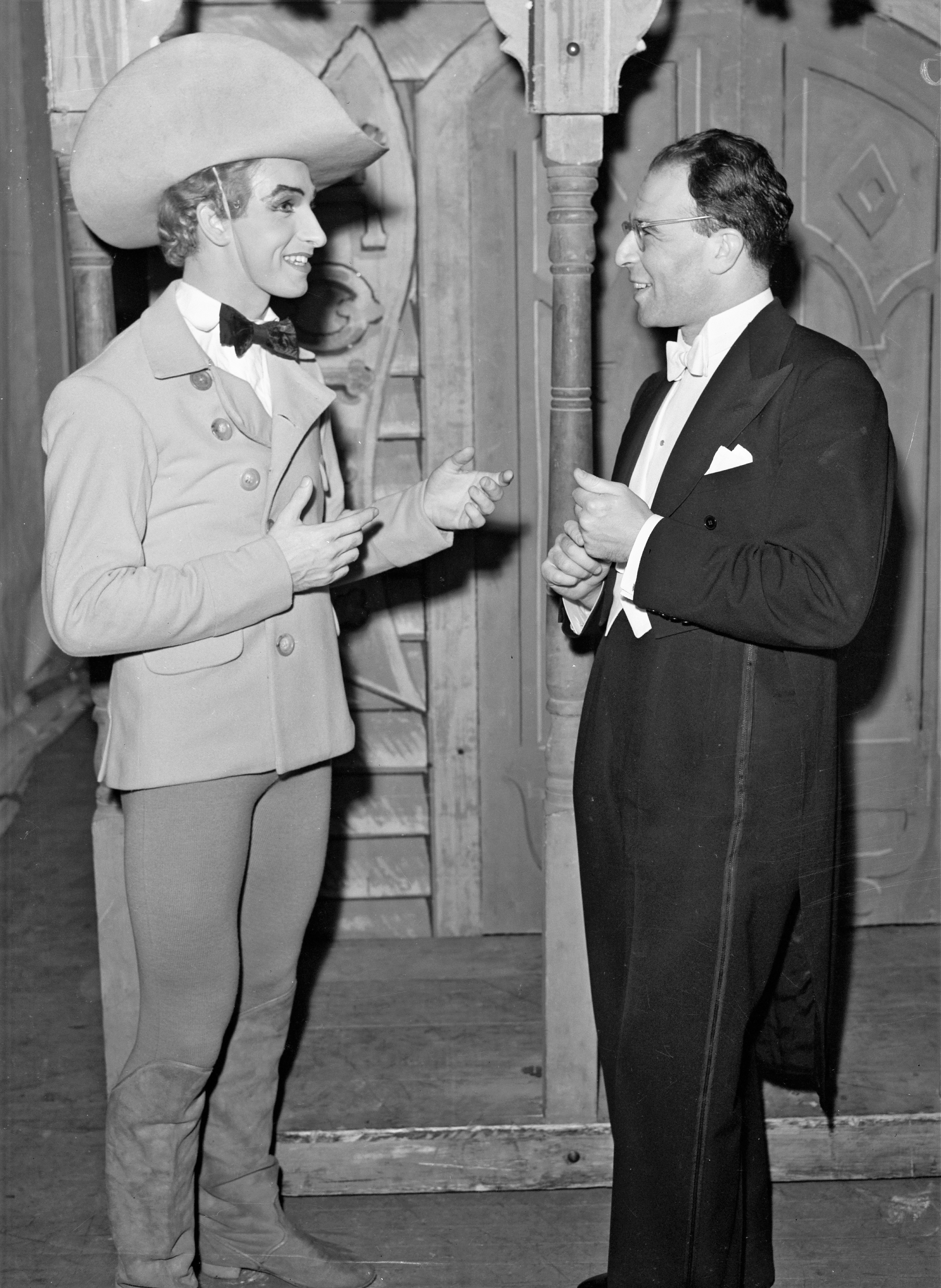
Franklin (left) with conductor Franz Allers at the Ballet Russe de Monte Carlo performance of Ghost Town, Los Angeles, 1940

Born in Liverpool, England, Frederic Franklin claimed that on seeing the 1924 film Peter Pan, his only thought was to go on the stage. He began his career in 1931 at the Casino de Paris with Josephine Baker. In his time in England, Franklin performed with Wendy Toye and Anton Dolin in acts such as the cabaret, variety, concert ballet, vaudeville, and theater. After briefly dancing with the Vic-Wells Ballet, forerunner of The Royal Ballet, he joined the Markova-Dolin Ballet in 1935.

In 1938 Franklin joined the Ballet Russe de Monte Carlo where he was premier danseur until 1952. Known as a quick study and for having an impeccable memory, Franklin also became the company's ballet master in 1944. With the Ballet Russe, Franklin originated many indelible characters and starred in over 45 principal roles by such choreographers as Leonide Massine, Michel Fokine, Bronislava Nijinska, Frederick Ashton, George Balanchine, and Agnes de Mille.

In 1949, Franklin went on a concert tour in South Africa. Throughout his time there, he performed ballets such as the Nutcracker and the Mirage. Upon returning to the states and creating his own Ballet with Mia Slavenska, they performed programs such as Swan Lake and A Streetcar Named Desire. In addition, the Slavenska-Franklin Ballet had the opportunity to go to Japan. In Japan, Franklin was able to bring together Swan Lake with the help of Japanese children. However, the Slavenska-Franklin Ballet had begun to experience extreme financial difficulties. As a result, in 1955, Franklin returned to the city and was able to rejoin the Ballet Russe de Monte Carlo. The Ballet Russe de Monte Carlo's 1957 season was extremely special because it was the 20-year anniversary as well as Franklin's last show with them. After, Franklin briefly taught at the Ballet of Monte Carlo School on Madison Ave.

While performing internationally with the Ballet Russe de Monte Carlo, Franklin and Alexandra Danilova created one of the legendary ballet partnerships of the twentieth century. Among the other ballerinas he partnered were Alicia Markova, Yvette Chauviré, Moira Shearer, Rosella Hightower, Maria Tallchief, Tamara Toumanova, and Alicia Alonso. In addition, he performed roles such as the Baron in Gaite Parisienne, the Baron in Night Shadow (La Sonnambula), and the Champion Roper in Rodeo.

In the 1950s, Franklin also gained experienced when he went to Puerto Rico after a call from Juan Anduze. Upon his return to the states in 1962, he went to Washington D.C, where he joined the National Ballet as founding director, and stayed with them for 12 years. On the opening night of National Ballet of Washington, D.C. following his return, there were 100 musicians of the National Symphony Orchestra, an abundance of magazine and news crews, and choreographer George Balanchine also came to watch.

== Director and choreographer ==
In 1952, Franklin co-founded the Slavenska-Franklin Ballet with Mia Slavenska and a few years later he became the co-director of the Washington Ballet, and then the co-founder and artistic director of the National Ballet of Washington, D.C.

In his lifetime, Franklin choreographed three pieces. In 1958, he created his first ever piece for the Washington Ballet called Etalage. His second piece is called Homage Au Ballet which was also for the Washington Ballet in 1963. His final piece is called The Tribute which was for the Ballet Russe de Monte Carlo in 1962. According to an interview Franklin had done, he best choreographs by visualizing the dancers and their movements in his head.

After a few years in Washington, D.C., Franklin began a freelance career reviving and staging works around the United States and developed artistic associations with many ballet companies including Cincinnati Ballet where he was artistic director for two years and later Director Emeritus, Dance Theatre of Harlem where he became artistic advisor in 1989, Chicago Ballet, Tulsa Ballet, the Oakland Ballet, Pittsburgh Ballet Theatre, and American Ballet Theatre.

In 2005, Franklin was featured in the documentary film Ballets Russes, recounting his years with the famous company. Into his 90s, Franklin continued to perform with American Ballet Theatre, appearing in mime roles such as the Friar in Romeo and Juliet, Madge in La Sylphide, and the Prince's Tutor in Swan Lake.

Franklin died from pneumonia in New York City at the Weill Cornell Medical Center on 4 May 2013. He was survived by his partner of 48 years, William Haywood Ausman, and his brother, John Franklin.

== Awards ==
In 1984, Frederic Franklin was honored with a Laurence Olivier Award for his staging of a Creole-themed Giselle starring Virginia Johnson at Dance Theatre of Harlem. Franklin received the Dance Magazine Award in 1985 and the Capezio Dance Award in 1992. On 16 November 2004 Franklin was appointed a Commander of The Most Excellent Order of the British Empire. In 2011, Franklin was inducted into the National Museum of Dance's Mr. & Mrs. Cornelius Vanderbilt Whitney Hall of Fame.
