= Alexandra Danilova =

Russian-American ballerina (1903–1997)

- Александра Данилова
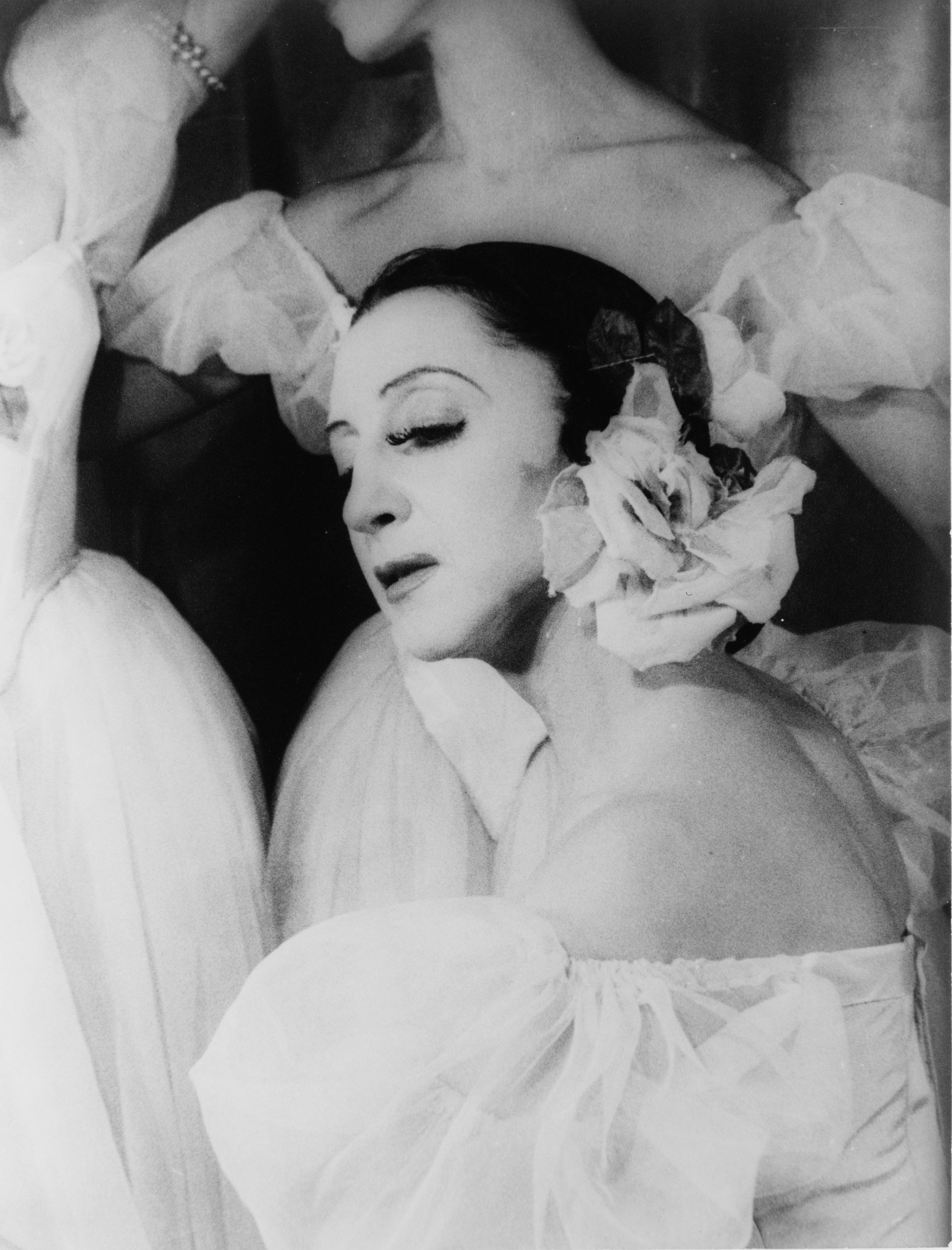
- Danilova as Fanny Cerrito in Pas de Quatre, 1948
- Born: Aleksandra Dionisyevna Danilova; November 20, 1903; Peterhof, Russia
- Died: July 13, 1997 (aged 93); New York City, U.S.
- Citizenship: Russian; American (naturalized 1946)
- Occupations: Ballerina; teacher
- Spouse(s): Giuseppe Massera (m. 1934) Kazimir Kokich (m. 1941)
- Partner: George Balanchine (1926–1933)
- Awards: Capezio Dance Award, 1958; Mae L. Wien Award, 1989; Kennedy Center Honoree, 1989

Aleksandra Dionisyevna Danilova (Russian: Александра Дионисьевна Данилова; November 20, 1903 – July 13, 1997) was a Russian-born prima ballerina, who became an American citizen. In 1989, she was recognized for lifetime achievements in ballet as a Kennedy Center Honoree.

== Early life ==
Born in Peterhof, Russian Empire on November 20, 1903, she trained at the Russian Imperial Ballet School in Leningrad (now St. Petersburg). She was one of the few Russian-trained ballerinas to tour outside Russia. Her first professional post was as a member of St. Petersburg's Imperial Ballet.

== Career ==
On July 4, 1924, Danilova in a group of four dancers led by George Balanchine left Russia. They wanted to experience European art. Overwhelmed by Berlin of early Weimar culture, they then as Soviet ballet stars left on "a tour of Rhineland spa towns". In October these same four "principle dancers of the Russian National Ballet" were in London at The Empire theater. Discoverd by Sergei Diaghilev he auditioned them in Paris for his Ballets Russes, Danilova as a dancer, Balanchine as a choreographer.

Danilova toured in Diaghilev's company. She and Balanchine lived together until the early 1930s. Diaghilev promoted her ballerina. After his death in 1929 she continued dancing, with Ballet Russe de Monte Carlo. As a leading performer of the company she often partnered with Leonid Massine, who served as its choreographer. Often the company toured in the United States and in Latin America. In the 1950s she famously partnered with Frederic Franklin. Known in the dance world for her stellar qualities, and generally for her celebrity glamour and beautiful legs, Danilova was a ballet professional. She was long adored by her audience.

The Ballet Russe de Monte Carlo presented Gaîté Parisienne in the U.S. for the first time at the Metropolitan Opera House, New York, on 12 October 1938, with Danilova as the Glove Seller. Portraying her as a vivacious, glamorous, sophisticated woman of the world, Danilova in Gaîté became one of the attractions of the Ballet Russe, and the ballet often concluded a season's opening-night performance. On the opening night of the company's 1941 season in New York, when Danilova made her first entrance she was given a spontaneous ovation that stopped the show. Such show-stopping ovations thenceforth became a tradition of every opening-night Gaîté with Danilova.

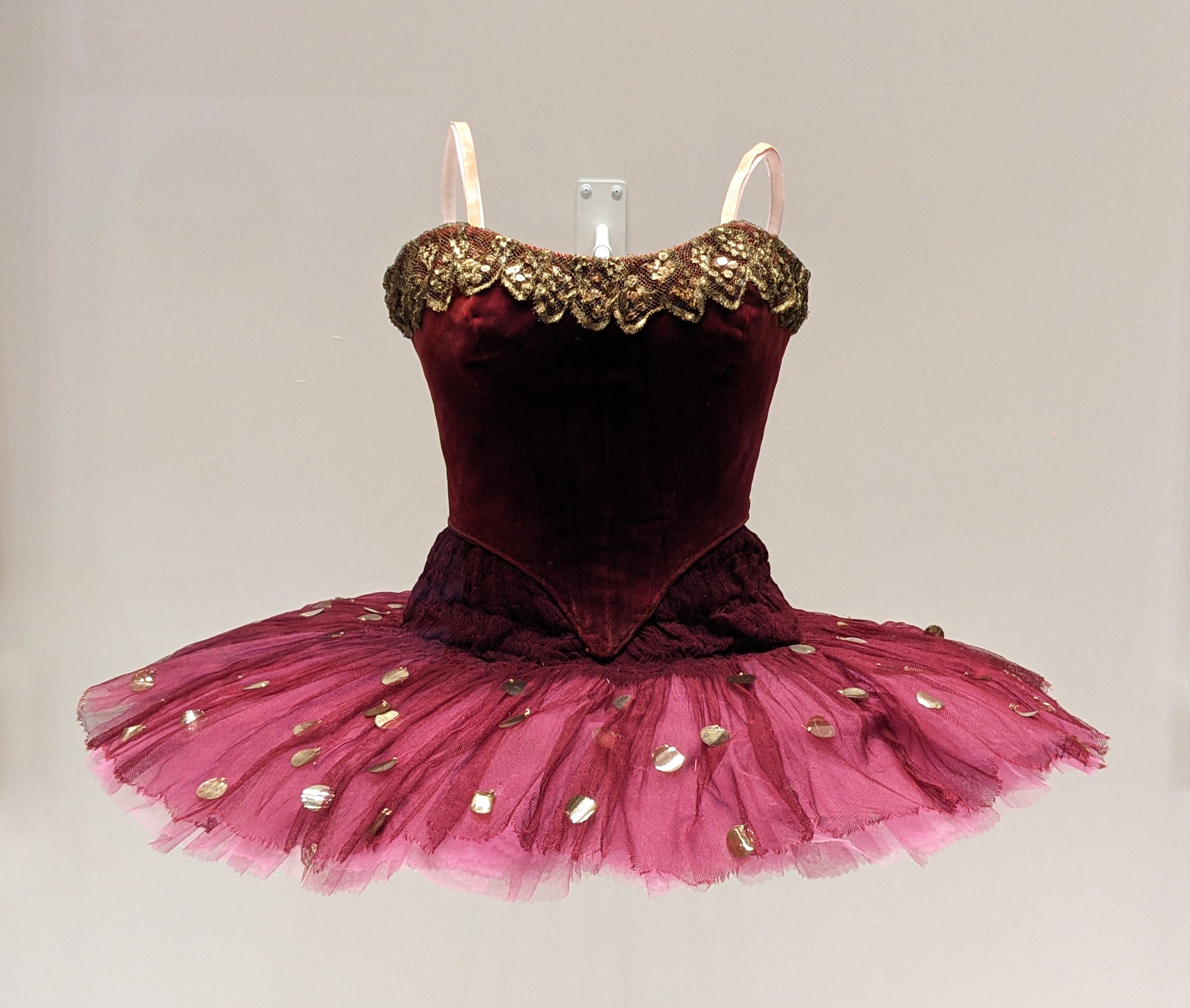
Danilova's "red swan" tutu, used when she danced the role of Odile in Swan Lake (New York Public Library)

Danilova made her Broadway debut in 1944's Song of Norway; her last ballet performance was in 1957. She made her musical comedy debut in 1958 in Oh, Captain!. She appeared in a single scene, a dance with the show's star, Tony Randall. (A year later, they performed it on an episode of The Dinah Shore Chevy Show, thus preserving it for posterity.) Unfortunately, Oh, Captain! was not a commercial success and closed a few months later. She was in financial straits when she came across Balanchine on the street in 1964. When he heard of her plight he instantly hired her to teach at the School of American Ballet. In 1965, she sought and received approval from Balanchine to produce a spring workshop performance for the students. These workshops became an important preview for many outstanding dancers. Danilova remained there until her retirement in 1989.

In 1972, she staged a New York City Ballet production of the romantic ballet Les Syphides, under the original title, Chopiniana. Two years later, in 1974, Balanchine choreographed a version of Coppélia for the New York City Ballet. He was assisted by Danilova, who had performed the title role many times during her dancing career. She staged the Petipa choreography for Act II.

Danilova had a small, but nostalgically delightful, role (especially for those who knew her earlier work) in the 1977 movie The Turning Point as a ballet coach for upcoming ballerinas.

In 1986 she published an autobiography called Choura, her own personal nickname. The book won the 1986 de la Torre Bueno Prize.

== Personal life ==
She had a long intimate relationship with Balanchine after his divorce from Tamara Geva, from 1926 to 1933, but they never married. They continued their professional partnership long after their romance ended. Danilova, who became an American citizen in 1946, was twice married, to Giuseppe Massera in 1934 and to Casimir Kokitch in 1941.

== Ephemera ==
In Hugh Martin's Look Ma, I'm Dancin' of 1948, a disillusioned would-be dancer contrasts her skills with the talents of some of the leading ballerinas of the day, including Markova and Pavlova. The song includes the line "And as for Alexandra Danilova, I know I'll never make a schlemiel of 'er."

== Death ==
Danilova died on July 13, 1997, in New York. She had a Russian Orthodox funeral service, and was interred at Oakland Cemetery, Sag Harbor, Suffolk County, New York — the same cemetery where George Balanchine is buried.

== See also ==
- List of Russian ballet dancers

== Bibliography ==
Primary

- Alexandra Danilova, Choura. The Memoirs of Alexandra Danilova (New York: Knopf 1986; Fromm 1988).
- A. E. Twysden, Alexandra Danilova (London: C. W. Beaumont 1945).

Secondary

- Christina Ezrabi, Swans of the Kremlin. Ballet and power in Soviet Russia (University of Pittsburgh 2012).
- Lynn Garafola, La Nijinska. Choreographer of the modern (Oxford University 2022).
- Robert Greskovic, Ballet. A complete guide (London: Robert Hale 1998).
- Jennifer Homans, Mr. B. George Balanchine's 20th century (New York: Random House 2022).
- Horst Koegler, Concise Oxford Dictionary of Ballet (Friedrich Verlag 1972; Oxford University 1977).
- Reynolds & McCormick, No Fixed Point. Dance in the twentieth century (Yale University 2003).
- Elizabeth Souritz, Soviet Choreographers in the 1920s (Iskusstvo 1979; London: Dance Books 1990).
