= Léonide Massine =

Russian choreographer and ballet dancer (1896–1979)

- Леонид Мясин
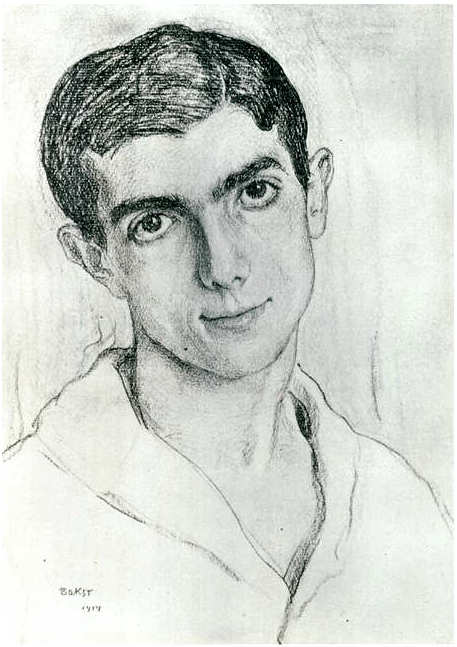
- Portrait by Léon Bakst, 1914
- Born: Leonid Fyodorovich Myasin; 9 August 1896; Moscow, Russia
- Died: 15 March 1979 (aged 82); Borken, West Germany
- Occupations: Dancer; choreographer
- Years active: 1915–1948
- Spouse(s): Vera Savina (div. 1924) Eugenia Delarova (div. 1938) Tatiana Orlova (div. 1968) Hannelore Holtwick
- Children: 4
- Awards: National Museum of Dance's Mr. & Mrs. Cornelius Vanderbilt Whitney Hall of Fame (2002)

Leonid Fyodorovich Myasin (Russian: Леони́д Фёдорович Мя́син), commonly known as Léonide Massine (9 August [O.S. 28 July] 1896 – 15 March 1979), was a Russian choreographer and ballet dancer. Massine created the world's first symphonic ballet, Les Présages, and many others in the same vein. Besides his "symphonic ballets," Massine choreographed many other popular works during his long career, some of which were serious and dramatic, and others lighthearted and romantic. He created some of his most famous roles in his own comic works, among them the Can-Can Dancer in La Boutique fantasque (1919), the Hussar in Le Beau Danube (1924), and, perhaps best known of all, the Peruvian in Gaîté Parisienne (1938). Today his oeuvre is represented by his son Lorca Massine, who stages his works around the world.

== Early life and education ==
Massine was born into a musical family on 9 August 1896 in Moscow, Russia. His mother was a soprano in the Bolshoi Theater Chorus and his father played the french horn in the Bolshoi Theater Orchestra. Leonid was one of five children. He had three brothers, Mikhail, Gregori, and Konstantin — as well as one sister — Raissa. Due to their small age difference, Leonid and Konstantin were very close during childhood. Beginning when Leonid was seven, the Massine family spent most summers at their summer dacha in Zvenigorod-Moskovsky.

In 1904, Leonid successfully auditioned for the Moscow Imperial Theater School. At only eight years old, he began his formal dance training. The next year, the director of the Bolshoi Theater, Alexander Gorsky, was looking for a small boy to play the role of Chernomor in the ballet Ruslan and Ludmilla. Leonid was selected for the role. This performance and rehearsal period ignited his lifelong passion for acting. Leonid was selected for three more professional roles at the Bolshoi and Maly Theaters through the 1908–1909 season.

In 1909, his brother Konstantin was killed during a hunting accident. Leonid never seemed to fully recover from the shock and devastation of this personal tragedy.

In August 1913, Massine graduated from the Moscow Imperial Theater School and almost immediately joined the Bolshoi Ballet. In December of the same year, Sergei Diaghilev came to Moscow in search of a dancer for a new production of The Legend of Joseph. His favorite Vaslav Nijinsky had originally been cast in the role, but Diaghilev terminated Nijinsky's contract upon his marriage to Romola de Pulszky. Diaghilev was attracted to Massine's onstage presence and acting, and invited him to audition for the choreographer, Mikhail Fokine. After the audition in St. Petersburg, Massine joined Diaghilev and his Ballets Russes.

== Ballets Russes ==
From 1915 to 1921 Massine was the principal choreographer of Sergei Diaghilev's Ballets Russes.

Following the departure of Vaslav Nijinsky, the company's first male star, Massine became the preeminent male star and took over Nijinsky's roles. His first ballet, in 1915, called Le Soleil de Nuit, used Russian folklore elements. The ballet Parade premiered at the Theatre du Chatelet in Paris, on 18 May 1917. The ballet is based on a libretto by Jean Cocteau. Parade is about a group of circus performers trying to lure a reluctant audience into the tent before the show begins. The sets and costume designs were by Pablo Picasso, who designed large cubist structures for the dancers to wear. The score was composed by Erik Satie, who used sounds from an airplane's engine, pistol shots, and a ship's siren to accompany the music. Le Tricorn, better known as The Three Cornered Hat, premiered at the Alhambra Theater in London, on 22 July 1919. Manuel de Falla composed the score and Pablo Picasso designed the sets and costumes. Massine's collaborators, all Spanish, helped to make this ballet more authentic to its subject matter. Le Tricorn was a triumphant success. The story was inspired by the novel El sombrero de tres picos (1874) by Pedro Antonio de Alarcón. In order to authentically depict the Spanish character dances, Massine carefully studied the authentic Spanish character dance style.

== Col. de Basil's Ballets Russes de Monte-Carlo ==
When George Balanchine left de Basil's company in 1933, Massine replaced him as resident choreographer. Massine's ballets during this period were reminiscent of Fyodor Lopukhov's Tanzsymphonia, in that an emphasis on the music drove the choreography. He continued to use symphonic music by well-known composers.

In 1932, he created Jeux d'enfants to libretto by Boris Kochno, scenic design was by Joan Miró. In 1933, Massine created the world's first symphonic ballet, Les Présages, using Tchaikovsky's Symphony No. 5. This caused a furor amongst musical purists, who objected to a serious symphonic work being used as the basis of a ballet. Undeterred, Massine continued work on Choreartium, set to Brahms' Fourth Symphony, which had its premiere on 24 October 1933 at the Alhambra Theatre in London. Massine also choreographed a ballet to Hector Berlioz's 1830 Symphonie Fantastique and danced the role of The Young Musician with Tamara Toumanova as The Beloved at its premiere at Covent Garden, London, on 24 July 1936 with Colonel Wassily de Basil's Ballet Russe de Monte Carlo.

== Massine & Blum's Ballet Russe de Monte-Carlo ==
Leaving Col. de Basil's company, in 1937 Massine and René Blum (himself a former associate of de Basil's) acquired financing from Julius Fleischmann, Jr.'s World Art, Inc. to create a new ballet company, with Massine as the resident choreographer. Massine soon discovered that the ballets he had choreographed while under contract with Col. de Basil were owned by his company. Massine sued Col. de Basil in London to regain the rights to his own works. He also sued to claim the Ballet Russe de Monte Carlo name. The jury decided that Col. de Basil owned Massine's ballets created between 1932 and 1937, but not those created before 1932. It also ruled that both successor companies could use the name Ballet Russe — but only Massine & Blum's company could be called Ballet Russe de Monte Carlo. Col. de Basil finally settled on the Original Ballet Russe.

The new Ballet Russe de Monte Carlo debuted in 1938; Massine choreographed Gaîté Parisienne, set to music by Jacques Offenbach, which premiered on 5 April at the Théâtre de Monte Carlo. Gaîté Parisienne was one of Massine's most celebrated works during this time. Instead of a whole, singular composition for the score, Offenbach created a series of divertissements. This allowed Massine to use a wide variety of dancers and tempi, all while conveying a single narrative. Massine revived the piece for American Ballet Theatre in 1970. Lorca Massine and Susanna della Pietra mounted an additional revival for ABT in 1988. In this production, the costumes were designed by Christian Lacroix, who created animated and eccentric costumes based on his own 1987 haute couture collection.

A month after premiering Gaîté Parisienne Massine produced Seventh Symphony, to Beethoven's score. It premiered on 5 May 1938 in Monte Carlo, with Alicia Markova, Nini Theilade, Frederic Franklin, and Igor Youskevitch as the principal dancers.

Massine left Ballet Russe de Monte Carlo in 1943.

== San Francisco Bay Area ==
In 1977 Massine moved to the San Francisco Bay Area to begin a series of choreographic workshops, as well as revive his work Le Beau Danube for the Marin Ballet. At the same time, Massine was working on plans for Parisina, which was to be performed by Natalia Makarova. However, Makarova began to suspect her part was originated on another dancer and pulled out of the project. Massine was appointed resident choreographer of the Marin Ballet. He began work on a new production of The Nutcracker, which was never seen outside the studio.

== Film work ==
Massine appeared in two feature-length films by the British directors Michael Powell and Emeric Pressburger: The Red Shoes (1948) and The Tales of Hoffmann (1951). He also had a cameo appearance in Powell's later film Honeymoon (1959). Massine starred in several films of ballet short subjects. For Warner Brothers, he starred with the Ballet Russe de Monte Carlo in a short Technicolor film of his ballet Capriccio Espagnol, entitled Spanish Fiesta (1942). He choreographed and danced in the 1947 20th Century Fox color film Carnival in Costa Rica, and also choreographed and appeared as Pulcinella in the film Carosello Napoletano. In 1941, Warner Bros made an attempt at a film version of the ballet of Gaîté Parisienne, entitled The Gay Parisian. The attempt was not well received, partly due to the fact that the signature role, played by Alexandra Danilova in the original work, was recast with a lesser dancer, Milada Mladova.

== Personal life ==
In his youth, Massine was the protégé and lover of Sergei Diaghilev. In later life he had numerous love affairs with women and had four wives. His first two wives, Vera Savina (née Vera Clark) and Eugenia Delarova, were both ballet dancers. With his third wife, Tatiana Orlova, he had two children, a son, Leonide Massine II (who later changed his name to "Lorca Massine"), and a daughter, Tatiania. He and Orlova divorced in 1968. He subsequently married Hannelore Holtwick, with whom he had two sons, Peter and Theodor, and made his home in Borken, West Germany, where he died on 15 March 1979.

In 1968 Massine published his autobiography, entitled My Life in Ballet.

== Awards ==
Massine was inducted into the National Museum of Dance and Hall of Fame in 2002.

== Major works ==
- 1915: Soleil de Nuit (Midnight Sun, to the music of Nikolai Rimsky-Korsakov, set and costumes by Mikhail Larionov)
- 1916: Las Meninas (music by Gabriel Fauré)
- 1917: The Good-Humoured Ladies (music by Domenico Scarlatti, arr. Vincenzo Tommasini)
- 1917: Parade (music by Erik Satie)
- 1919: La Boutique fantasque (music by Gioacchino Rossini, arr. Ottorino Respighi)
- 1919: The Three-Cornered Hat (music by Manuel de Falla)
- 1920: Pulcinella (music by Igor Stravinsky)
- 1924: Le Beau Danube (music by Johann Strauss, arr. Roger Desormière)
- 1928: Ode (music by Nicolas Nabokov, scenario by Boris Kochno, design by Pavel Tchelitchew)
- 1930: Le Sacre du printemps (music by Igor Stravinsky)
- 1933: Les Présages (to the music of Symphony No. 5 by Pyotr Tchaikovsky)
- 1933: Choreartium (to the music of Symphony No. 4 by Johannes Brahms)
- 1936: Symphonie fantastique (to the music of Symphonie fantastique by Hector Berlioz)
- 1938: Gaîté Parisienne (music by Jacques Offenbach, arr. Manuel Rosenthal)
- 1938: Seventh Symphony (music by Ludwig van Beethoven)
- 1938: Nobilissima Visione (music by Paul Hindemith)
- 1939: Capriccio Espagnol (music by Nikolai Rimsky-Korsakov; filmed in Warner Bros.' 1941 short Spanish Fiesta)
- 1942: Aleko (music by Pyotr Tchaikovsky)
- 1943: Mam'zelle Angot (music, Charles Lecocq)
- 1944: Mad Tristan (with sets, costumes, and artwork by Salvador Dalí)
- 1948: Capriccio (music by Igor Stravinsky)
- 1952: Laudes Evangelii (music by Valentino Bucchi, filmed for TV by Joan Kemp-Welch in 1961).

== Filmography ==
Year	Title	Role	Notes
1932	The Blue Danube	Dancer	
1947	Carnival in Costa Rica	Roberto	Uncredited
1948	The Red Shoes	Ljubov	
1951	The Tales of Hoffmann	Spalanzani / Schlemil / Franz	
1953	Aida		Uncredited
1954	Neapolitan Carousel	Antonio 'Pulcinella' Petito	
1959	Honeymoon	The Spectre in 'El Amor Brujo'	

== See also ==
- List of Russian ballet dancers

== Sources ==
- Scheijen, Sjeng (2010). Diaghilev: A Life. Profile Books. ISBN 978-1846681646.
