= Tamara Tchinarova =

French and Australian ballet dancer (1919–2017)

Tamara Tchinarova Finch
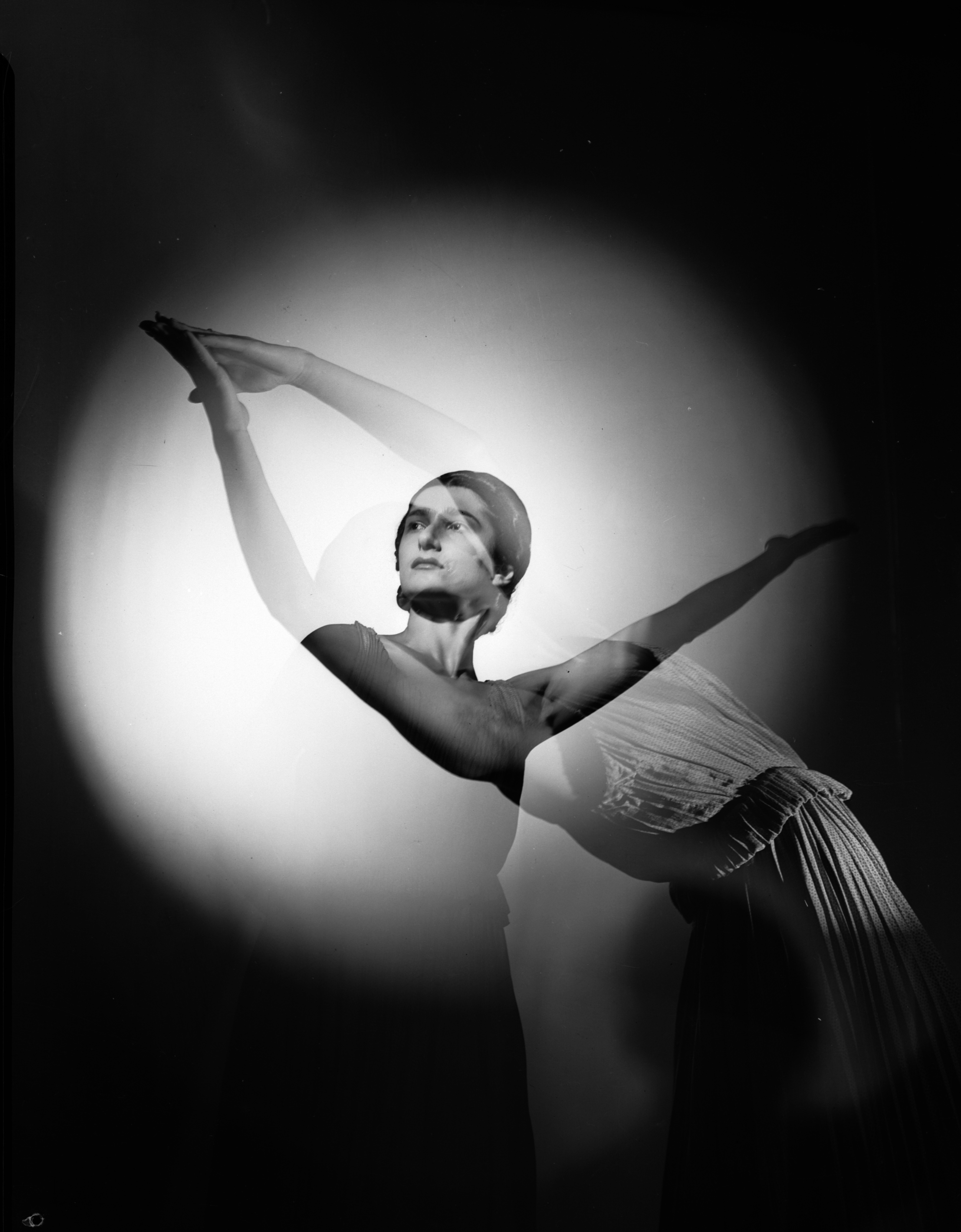
- Tchinarova in the ballet Les Presages in Sydney, 1936–1939
- Born: Tamara Yevsevievna Rekemchuk; 18 July 1919; Cetatea Albă, Kingdom of Romania
- Died: 31 August 2017 (aged 98); Marbella, Málaga, Spain
- Occupations: Ballet dancer; writer on dance; interpreter
- Years active: 1930–1946 (ballerina); 1958–2007 (author)
- Spouse: Peter Finch (m. 1943; div. 1959)
- Career
- Former groups: Ballet Russe de Monte Carlo, Kirsova Ballet, Polish-Australian Ballet, Borovansky Ballet

Tamara Yevsevievna Tchinarova (Russian: Тамара Евсевиевна Чинарова; née Rekemchuk [Рекемчук]; 18 July 1919 – 31 August 2017), also known as Tamara Finch, was a Romanian-born émigré Russian and French ballerina who contributed significantly to the development of Australian dance companies and was a Russian–English interpreter for touring ballet companies. She was a dance writer and author, as Tamara Finch, of a number of non-fiction books. She was the first wife of actor Peter Finch.

== Early life and family ==
Born Tamara Yevsevievna Rekemchuk (Russian: Тама́ра Евсевиевна Рекемчу́к) in 1919 in Cetatea Albă, Bessarabia to a Ukrainian journalist father with Georgian antecedents and a nurse mother of Armenian descent. Her maternal grandfather, Kristapor Chinaryan, was an Armenian landowner who survived the Hamidian massacres by the Ottoman Empire. In 1895, Chinaryan fled to Bessarabia, where he adopted the Russified surname of Chinarov. He married a Ukrainian woman and eventually became prosperous, owning three vineyards, three houses and a hotel. Her grandfather, she wrote, "would achieve success in business even on a desert island. He was practical, quick, receptive, generous, envied and loved." During the Kishinev pogroms, he sheltered Jewish families in his basements.

Her mother, Anna, studied nursing and served with the Red Cross during World War I. There she met an army captain of Ukrainian and Georgian descent, Yevsevy Rekemchuk, and married him in 1918. In the 1920s, the family moved to Paris, where her father had sought a journalistic career and one day took his daughter to see a performance of the Ballets Russes. Young Tamara made up her mind then to become a ballerina. She soon began her dance training with émigré ballerinas from the Imperial Russian Ballet. In 1926, her father resolved to return to the Soviet Union. She describes him as "idealistic" and wanting to help build a new society. Tamara's mother, however, was resolutely Anti-Bolshevik and decided to stay on in Paris with Tamara and neither ever saw him again. Tamara took her mother's maiden name, Chinarova (transliterated in French as "Tchinarova"). Unbeknown to his abandoned family, her father married again in the USSR. His second wife was a Ukrainian actress, Lidia Prikhodko, and in 1927 they had a son, Alexandr Rekemchuk (d. 2017), who went on to become an accomplished author. Meanwhile, Yevsevy worked for the Soviet Secret police but was arrested, imprisoned and finally shot in 1937 during the Great Purge. He was posthumously rehabilitated after Stalin's death. In 1940, Tchinarova's grandfather, Kristapor, 88, and his wife were murdered by Soviet troops, who stormed their home and bayoneted them. Other family members were exiled to Siberia, where several of them died.

== Ballet career ==
At age 10, Tchinarova began training in Paris with renowned ballet master Olga Preobrazhenskaya, formerly of the Imperial Russian Ballet. In 1931, while still twelve, she went on tour to Algeria and Morocco where she was introduced as "the littlest ballerina of the world." In 1932, she performed in Romania, including a show in her home town. Roma musicians accompanied the tour and Tchinarova learned complex gypsy dances, which she later used in Petrushka and other dances.

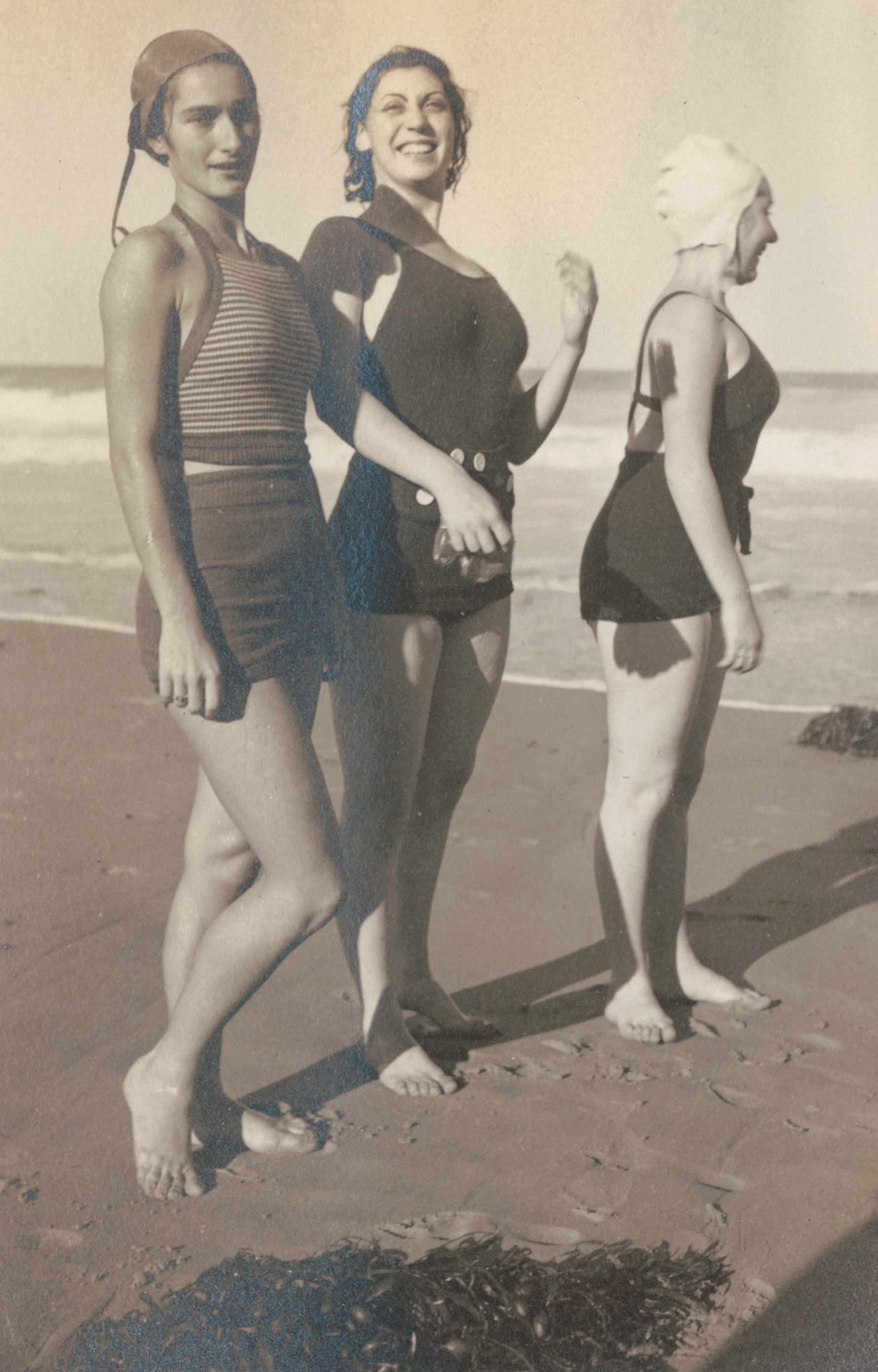
Tamara Tchinarova (left) and Nina Youshkevitch (centre) standing with an unknown woman at Bungan Beach, NSW, 1936 or 1937

In Paris, choreographer George Balanchine noticed Tchinarova and her classmates, and chose them for dance performances in operetta productions, notably, Orpheus in the Underworld.

Following the death of impresario Sergei Diaghilev a number of successor ballet companies formed in Europe. They included Ballet Russe de Monte-Carlo, Les Ballets 1933 and Colonel Wassily de Basil's Original Ballet Russe. While still in her teens Tchinarova joined various of these companies. In 1932, she joined the Ballet Russe de Monte Carlo and quickly gained prominence. Tchinarova and classmates Irina Baronova, who became a fast friend, Tatiana Riabouchinska and Tamara Toumanova were dubbed Balanchine's "Baby Ballerinas" and known as the "Russians who have never danced in Russia."

In 1936, she travelled on tour to Australia with de Basil's Monte Carlo Russian Ballet. During that tour she was elated when the critic, Arnold Haskell, described her performance in Léonide Massine's Les Présages, as "brilliant" and "outstanding". Two years later in 1938 accompanied by her mother, she returned to Australia with another de Basil troupe, the Covent Garden Russian Ballet. She was admired for her portrayal of Tamar the Georgian Queen in Michel Fokine's dramatic ballet Thamar, and was praised for her dancing in demi-character roles in ballets such as Le Beau Danube.

In 1939, at the conclusion of the Covent Garden Russian Ballet tour, along with a number of her colleagues, Tchinarova and her mother opted to stay in Australia. Tchinarova taught at the Frances Scully School of Dancing while her mother worked in a factory, stitching women's underwear progressing later to making ballet costumes. In 1941 Tchinarova was asked to join the Kirsova Ballet founded by the Dane, Helene Kirsova, a former ballerina in de Basil's touring companies. For Kirsova she created a number of roles, including that of Satana in Kirsova's three-act production of Faust, which premiered in November of that year.

During the 1940s Tchinarova's contribution to newly developing Australian companies cannot be over estimated. These included the Polish-Australian Ballet and the Borovansky Ballet. During her time with the latter she was not only a principal dancer but, supplementing Edouard Borovansky's poor recall of detail, she contributed the lion's share to re-staging with him ballets such as Carnaval, Scheherazade and Le Beau Danube from the Ballets Russes repertoire. After the end of the Borovansky Ballet season in 1946 Tchinarova danced in two musical productions The Dancing Years and Gay Rosalinda. In 1948, she left for London with her husband. Her devoted mother also relocated to London, where she died in 1979.

== Later life ==
Having retired from performing, Tamara Finch initially worked as a Russian interpreter for trade delegations to and from the Soviet Union, but this gave way to a return to the world of ballet helping many English-speaking dance companies, including The Australian Ballet, during tours to Russia, and for Russian companies touring in the West. She also developed a writing career contributing to a range of dance magazines, notably in the Dancing Times. In 1958 she was co-author, with Hector Cameron, of a collection of Russian fairy tales for children, entitled The Little King: The book of twenty nights and one night. In the 1980s and 90s she published a number of biographies of dancers and an autobiography in 2007.

== Personal life ==
During World War II, Tchinarova was first engaged to the Australian photojournalist Fred Breen who was in the Royal Australian Air Force. Breen died in a bombing raid over Germany in 1942. Some months later, she met the English-born Australian actor Peter Finch. Although Finch was in the forces, they were able to marry in 1943 and she continued her dancing career. Following encouragement from Laurence Olivier and Vivien Leigh, who saw Finch in an Australian stage production of Molière's The Imaginary Invalid, Tchinarova and Finch moved to London in 1948, marking the end of her dancing career with a view to enhancing his acting prospects. They had a daughter, Anita, born in 1949. The couple separated in 1956, after Tchinarova discovered his affair with actress Vivien Leigh during filming in Los Angeles. The couple divorced in 1959.

Tamara Finch continued living in London until 2004 when she retired, at age 87, to Spain to be with her family. In 2006, she met for the first time her half-brother, Alexandr Rekemchuk, eight years her junior, who visited from Moscow. Tamara Tchinarova Finch died in Marbella in 2017.

== Bibliography ==
As Tamara Finch:

- The first baby ballerinas, 1985.
- Dance portrait: Stephanie Dabney, 1986
- Matz Skoog, 1987
- Vaganova's pupil: Irina Kolpakova, 1988
- Nijinska as task-master, 1991
- Tamara Toumanova. publ. Dancing Times. July 1997, p. 889—891, 893.
- Dancing into the Unknown: My Life in the Ballets Russes and Beyond, 2007.

== See also ==
- Ballets Russes
- Rachel Cameron
- List of Russian ballet dancers
