= Mozartiana (ballet) =

Ballet choreographed by George Balanchine

- Choreographer: George Balanchine
- Music: Pyotr Ilyich Tchaikovsky
- Premiere: June 4, 1981; New York State Theater
- Original ballet company: New York City Ballet
- Design: Rouben Ter-Arutunian

Mozartiana is a ballet choreographed by George Balanchine to Tchaikovsky's Orchestral Suite No. 4, Mozartiana. The current version of the ballet was made for New York City Ballet's Tchaikovsky Festival, and premiered on June 4, 1981, at the New York State Theater. It is considered Balanchine's last major work.

Balanchine had previously choreographed to the same score in 1933, for his short-lived troupe Les Ballets 1933 in Paris, his first major ballet to music by Tchaikovsky. It had its American premiere the following year, and Balanchine made some changes to the choreography in 1935. This earlier version was performed by several troupes until 1956. This version's choreography and designs are completely different from the 1981 version.

== Previous versions ==
In 1933, George Balanchine and librettist Boris Kochno co-founded Les Ballets 1933, after being dismissed from the Original Ballet Russe. The company was mainly funded by Edward James, and also backed by friends such as composer Cole Porter and fashion designer Coco Chanel. One of the ballets Balanchine choreographed for the company was Mozartiana, to Tchaikovsky's Orchestral Suite No. 4, Mozartiana, which was written as a tribute to Mozart. It was the first time Balanchine created a major ballet to music by Tchaikovsky. The costumes and set were designed by Christian Bérard. The ballet premiered on June 7, 1933, at Théâtre des Champs-Élysées, Paris, at Les Ballets 1933's first-ever performance. It starred a fourteen-year-old Tamara Toumanova and Roman Jasinski. The company disbanded after four weeks of performances in Paris and London between June and July.

In 1934, Balanchine co-founded the School of American Ballet in New York. To allow the students to learn his style, Balanchine had the students learn the works he made for Les Ballets 1933, including Mozartiana. In June 1934, the students performed the ballet at the school co-founder Edward Warburg's estate in White Plains, New York, despite Balanchine's reluctance to let the inexperienced students to dance in front of an audience. Among the students in Mozartiana were Marie-Jeanne. Some of the girls had to perform roles that were meant for men. The students performed the ballet again in December that year, this time at Avery Memorial Theatre, Hartford, Connecticut, at the invitation of Arthur Everett Austin Jr.

In 1935, Balanchine's American Ballet revived Mozartiana, with parts of the choreography revised. It was performed at the company's cross-country tour, starting at Westchester County Center in White Plains, New York. However, the tour was canceled after two weeks. It was performed at least once at the Metropolitan Opera House the following year. In 1945, Ballet Russe de Monte Carlo revived Mozartiana, with a cast led by Alexandra Danilova and Frederic Franklin. In 1956, Danilova's troupe performed Mozartiana. This was the last revival of the original Mozartiana, making it the longest-lived ballet in the Les Ballet 1933 repertory.

== Production ==
In 1981, Balanchine, who had made thirty-seven ballets to music by Tchaikovsky, decided that the New York City Ballet would hold an eleven day-long Tchaikovsky Festival to pay tribute to the composer. For the festival, he decided to rechoreograph Mozartiana.

Balanchine chose Suzanne Farrell to dance the female lead role. According to Farrell's memoir, she thought it was possible that Mozartiana would be the last time the two work together due to Balanchine's poor health. He asked her who did she want to dance the ballet with, and she suggested Peter Martins, her frequent partner. However, Balanchine suggested Ib Andersen, a new member of the company whom Farrell had never danced with. Despite her initial reservations, Farrell soon realized that Andersen fitted the vision Balanchine had for the ballet. Balanchine was so impressed by Andersen's subtleness and musicality that he once exclaimed "Ib is Mozart." Victor Castelli was chosen as another soloist in the ballet. Four students at the School of American Ballet, Dara Adler, Lisa Cantor, Amy Fixler and Tamara Aguirre Molina, were all cast in the ballet.

Rehearsals for the new Mozartiana began in May, three weeks before the ballet premiere, while the company's performance season was ongoing, all other ballet masters were busy working on other ballets, and Balanchine himself was staging other works. Balanchine changed the sequence of the music, with Preghiera moved to the beginning of the ballet, so Farrell could dance in both Preghiera and the Theme and Variations. It took one to three hours for Balanchine to work on each sections of the ballet, with few changes made afterwards. Preghiera was the last section Balanchine worked on, and was choreographed between the matinee and evening performances in one day. Balanchine however was unable to decided how the Theme and Variations should end until the day of the premiere. During one of the last rehearsals for the ballet, Castelli injured himself, and was replaced with Christopher d'Amboise, a new member of the company and son of principal dancer Jacques d'Amboise. Both Farrell and former members of Ballet Russe noted the 1981 Mozartiana is completely different to the previous versions.

The costumes were designed by Rouben Ter-Arutunian, replacing the Christian Bérard designs for the 1933 version. Farrell recalled that Ter-Arutunian and Balanchine went through multiple versions of the costumes for her. The final product, a knee-length black tutu, was completed on the day of the dress rehearsal and the day before the premiere. Previously, Farrell was usually dressed in white in Balanchine ballets.

Robert Maiorano, a former soloist at the company who went on to become a writer, was allowed to observe the development process for Mozartiana. He and Valerie Brooks then co-authored the book Balanchine's Mozartiana: The Making of a Masterpiece, published in 1985.

Mozartiana was made after Balanchine signed his will. As one of the ballets not specified in his will, the rights to the ballet went to dancer Karin von Aroldingen and his secretary Barbara Horgan, both of whom inherited many of his works, following his death in 1983.

== Choreography ==
Mozartiana is danced by a principal ballerina, two men, a corps de ballet of four tall women, and four young girls. Farrell noted the ballet is challenging for the dancers' stamina, and added, "Mozartiana is a ballet that is big for the eyes and ears, but is danced by a small cast. Though it is contained, it's all over the place. There are some very hard, different things in it. Having a good class beforehand isn't going to make you dance this ballet better. And there's nothing in it that you can relate to other ballets you've done, for security."

The first section of the ballet is Preghiera, or Prayer, is performed by the principal ballerina and the four children. Farrell commented, "Technically, this dance was short and simple, but it required a state of mind beyond anything I had ever attempted before. It was a hymn shared by [Balanchine] and me, an offering that could happen only in movement and music, not in words. Balanchine's biographer Bernard Taper noted that in this section accented the theme of memento mori.

Gigue is a male solo. Castelli, whom the role was made for, commented, "The steps were mostly short and had to be very sharp and down into the floor. Certain of the rhythms seemed to go almost opposite to what the music was saying and put you off going into the next step. But once you got them in your body you suddenly realized that was the only way it could be done." It is followed by Minuet, danced by the corps of four women.

Theme and Variations is performed by the principal couple. Unlike traditional pas de deux, it begins with several solos for each of the dancers, and ends with a duet, which Farrell described, "Even here the dancing was not at all the usual male/female partnering. Ib and I often danced separately in a kind of dialogue with each other. If most pas de deux indicate a kind of love story, this one did not. We didn't seem to be man and woman, but people with some kind of greater independence and purpose."

The finale features the entire cast, and was described as "joyous, full-blossoming" by critic Jennifer Dunning.

== Performances ==
Mozartiana premiered on June 4, 1981, at the New York State Theater, during the first night of the Tchaikovsky Festival During the premiere, Farrell broke a small bone on her right foot, though she managed to complete the performance. While Mozartiana was scheduled to perform several more times during the festival, they were all canceled as there were no understudies. Castelli took over the role he was supposed to dance the year after its premiere.

In 1982, the first performance of Mozartiana outside of the New York City Ballet was held at Chicago City Ballet, where Farrell's then-husband, Paul Mejia, served as co-artistic director. Farrell and Andersen reprised their roles as guest artists. However, it was only performed once as Andersen had to undergo an emergency appendectomy the next day. According to Farrell, in 1984, Rudolf Nureyev had expressed interest in dancing Mozartiana but was unable to do so "for several reasons."

Mozartiana had since been revived by Farrell's company, the Suzanne Farrell Ballet. Other troupes that had performed the ballet include the Paris Opera Ballet, American Ballet Theatre, National Ballet of Canada, Birmingham Royal Ballet, Pacific Northwest Ballet and Kansas City Ballet.

In 2005, after Castelli's death, the New York City Ballet dedicated a performance of Mozartiana to him.

== Critical reception ==
Following the premiere, New York Times critic Anna Kisselgoff commented that "Mozartiana is a subtle work, deliberately simple-looking, from a choreographer who can create the most complex ballets in the world." However, she noted that the ballet was underrehearsed. Later that year, she reviewed the ballet again, now "performed properly", and wrote, "For all its seriousness as a work of art, Mozartiana is also a work of gaiety. Here is a ballet as sublime as the not-so unrelated Balanchine-Mozart Divertimento No. 15. It has a similar pristinely crystalline quality. But it also has a new wit and epigrammatic tone that manifest themselves in several ways."

Mozartiana is considered Balanchine's last major work.
