= Tamara Toumanova =

Georgian-American ballerina (1919–1996)

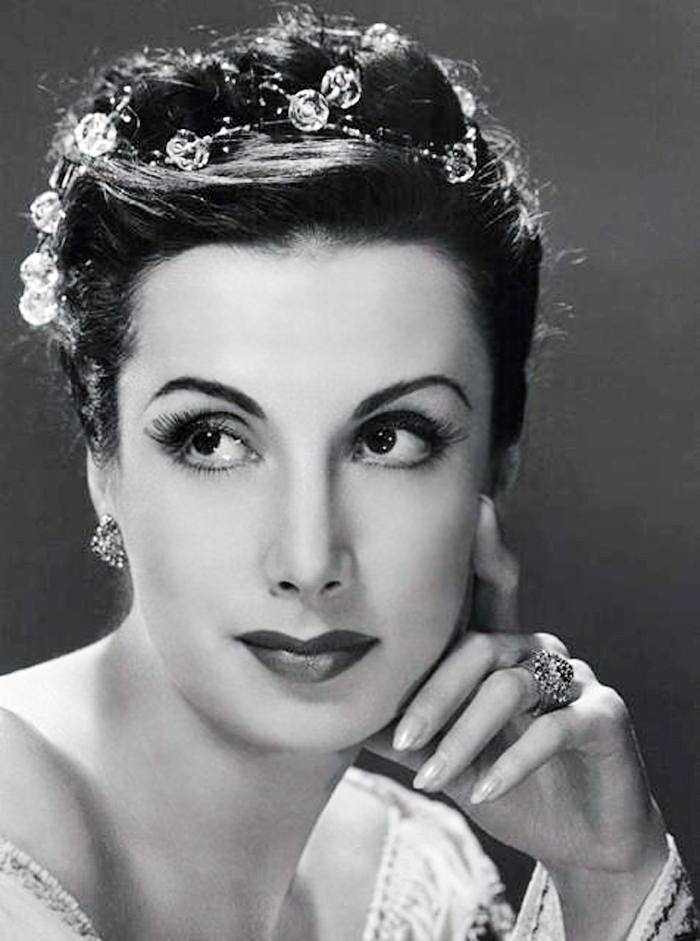
- 1940s promotional portrait photo
- Born: 2 March 1919; Tyumen, Russian SFSR
- Died: 29 May 1996 (aged 77); Santa Monica, California, U.S.
- Resting place: Hollywood Forever Cemetery
- Occupations: Ballerina, actress
- Spouse: Casey Robinson (1944–55; div.)

Tamara Toumanova (Georgian: თამარა თუმანოვა; 2 March 1919 – 29 May 1996) was a Russian-born Georgian-American prima ballerina and actress. A child of exiles in Paris after the Russian Revolution of 1917, she made her debut at the age of 10 at the children's ballet of the Paris Opera.

She became known internationally as one of the Baby Ballerinas of the Ballet Russe de Monte Carlo after being discovered by her fellow émigré, balletmaster and choreographer George Balanchine. She was featured in numerous ballets in Europe. Balanchine featured her in his productions at Ballet Theatre, New York, making her the star of his performances in the United States. While most of Toumanova's career was dedicated to ballet, she appeared as a ballet dancer in several films, beginning in 1944. She became a naturalized United States citizen in 1943 in Los Angeles, California.

== Career ==
Toumanova was the daughter of Yevgenia (or Eugenia) Dmitrievna Toumanishvili, who was half-Georgian-Armenian on her father's side, and half-Georgian on her mother's side. Her father was Dmitri Toumanov, originally of Georgian Toumanishvili family; her mother was Yelizaveta Chkheidze.

At the time of her daughter's birth, Yevgenia was married to Konstantin Zakharov (a Russian). Both Tamara and her mother used the surname Khassidovitch (Yevgenia's second husband was Vladimir Khassidovitch (akas: Vladimir Khassidovitch-Boretsky/Vladimir Khazidovich-Boretsky) for most of their lives following the end of Yevgenia's first marriage, including on their paperwork for naturalization as citizens of the United States.

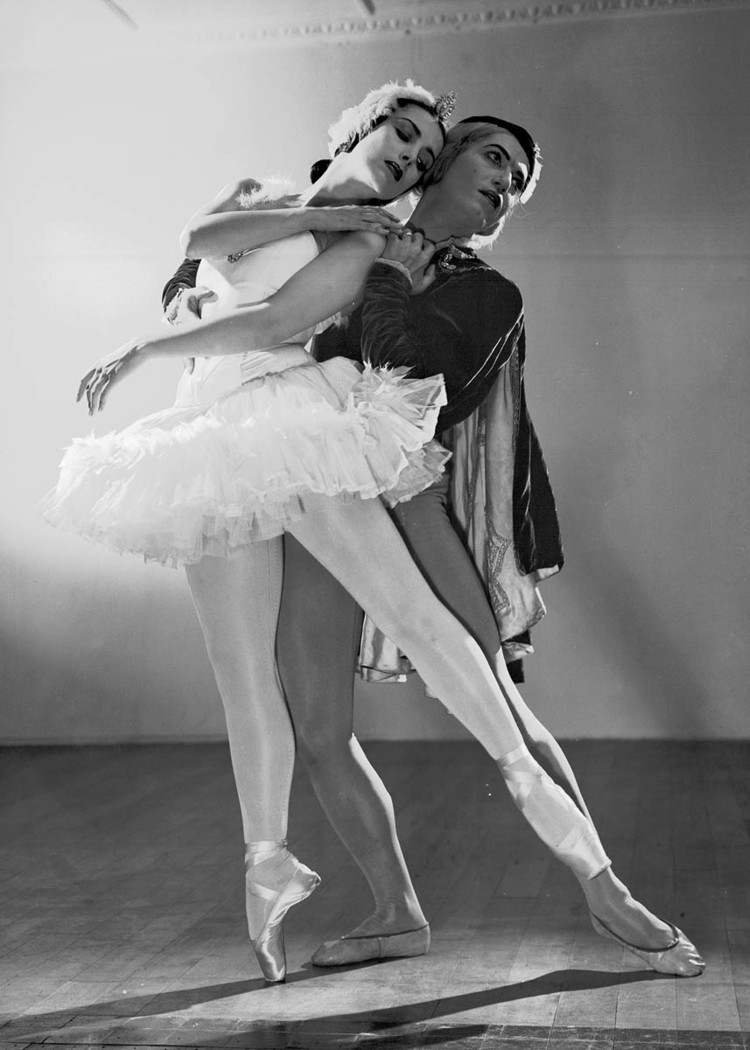
Toumanova and Serge Lifar performing Swan Lake, 1939–1940, by Max Dupain.

After moving to Paris, Toumanova was given piano lessons and studied ballet with Olga Preobrajenska, whom she described as her "first and only permanent teacher" and an "immortal friend".

At the age of six, Toumanova was invited by the ballerina Anna Pavlova to perform in one of her gala concerts in 1925. Toumanova danced a polka choreographed by Preobrajenska. Tamara was 10 years old when she made her debut at the Paris Opera as a child étoile in the ballet L'Éventail de Jeanne (for which 10 French composers wrote the music).

In 1931, when Toumanova was 12 years old, George Balanchine saw her in ballet class and engaged her for de Basil's Ballet Russe de Monte Carlo, along with Irina Baronova (aged 12) and Tatiana Riabouchinska (aged 14). The three girls were an immediate success, and writer Arnold Haskell dubbed them the "baby ballerinas".

Toumanova became recognised as a young prodigy in her time. She came to be called "The Black Pearl of the Russian Ballet", because, as ballet critic A. V. Coton wrote, "she was the loveliest creature in the history of the ballet", with 'black silky hair, deep brown eyes and pale almond skin'. Toumanova was considered the most glamorous of the trio. Throughout her career, her mother was her companion, nursemaid, dresser, agent and manager – she was always at the helm.

Balanchine created the role of the "Young Girl" for Toumanova in his ballet Cotillon and had her star in his Concurrence and Le Bourgeois Gentilhomme. Léonide Massine worked closely with Toumanova in the creation of many of his ballets. She played the part of the Top in his Jeux d'Enfants. Balanchine created a role for her in his Le Palais de Cristal (since re-titled Symphony in C) in 1947 at the Paris Opera.

In 1936, while Toumanova was performing ballet in Chicago, an 18-year-old boy named Burr Tillstrom came to see her perform. Following the ballet, Burr went backstage to meet her. As they talked, Toumanova and Tillstrom became friends. Some time later, Tillstrom showed her a favorite puppet he had made and she, surprised by his revelation, exclaimed "Kukla" (Russian for "puppet"). Burr Tillstrom went on to create a very early (1947) television show for children, titled Kukla, Fran and Ollie.

=== Chronology ===
- 1925: (6 August 1925) First performs before the public in the polka choreographed by Olga Preobrajenska (to Anatoly Liadov), during an Anna Pavlova gala at the Palais du Trocadéro, Paris (Pavlova selected Toumanova from Preobrajenska's school).
- 1929: Creates first principal role on 4 March, as guest étoile with the Paris Opera Ballet, performing the Valse (to Ibert), the Polka (to Milhaud), the Rondeau (to Auric), and the Kermesse-Valse (to Schmitt), in the Yvonne Franck/Alice Bourgat one-act ballet in 10 parts for students, L'Even-tail de Jeanne.
- 1929–30: Performs with the Paris Opera Ballet in Monte Carlo, in Brussels, and in Geneva at the League of Nations.
- 1931: Joins the Blum-de Basil Original Ballet Russe at Balanchine's invitation.
- 1932: Creates principal roles with the Ballet Russe de Monte-Carlo: the Young Girl in Balanchine's Cotillon; The Girl in his La Concurrence; Lucille in his Le Bourgeois Gentilhomme; in the Valse in his Suites de danse; in his Classical Ballet section for the opera-ballet Patrie; the Chinese Woman and a Poppy in his dances for the opera Fay-yen-Fah; a Chinese Porcelain in his dances for the opera Turandot; in his Grand pasclassique for the operetta A Night in Venice; and the Top in Massine's Jeux d'enfants. Recreates the Ballerina in Fokine's Petrushka and the Mazurka and the Valse pas de deux in Les Sylphides. Privately studies the classics and choreographic theory with Balanchine. Seasons in Monte Carlo and Paris and tour of Europe.
- 1933: Joins the Balanchine-James Les Ballets 1933 at Balanchine's invitation. Creates principal roles: in the Tema con variazioni and finale in his Mozartiana, the Ballerina in his Les Songes, and the Young Girl in his Fastes. Rejoins Ballet Russe de Monte-Carlo. Creates principal role in Massine's Choreartium (to Brahms's Fourth Symphony).
- 1934: Creates with the Ballet Russe de Monte-Carlo the Mexican Girl in Massine's Union Pacific and a principal role in Lichine's Les Imaginaires. Recreates the Miller's Wife with Massine in his Le Tricorne and the Tarantella in his La Boutique fantasque; Odette in Swan Lake Act II; and the title role in Fokine's Firebird. Tours of the United States, Canada, Central America, and Europe; seasons in Paris, London, Mexico City, Barcelona, Havana, Montreal, and New York.
- 1935: Creates with de Basil's Ballet Russe de Monte-Carlo the Poor Couple, with Massine, in his Jardin public; a principal role in his Le Bal; and Nijinska's Lezginka for a Covent Garden gala. Adds to her repertory Aurora in Tchaikovsky's Le Mariage d'Aurore and the Girl in Fokine's La Spectre de la rose.

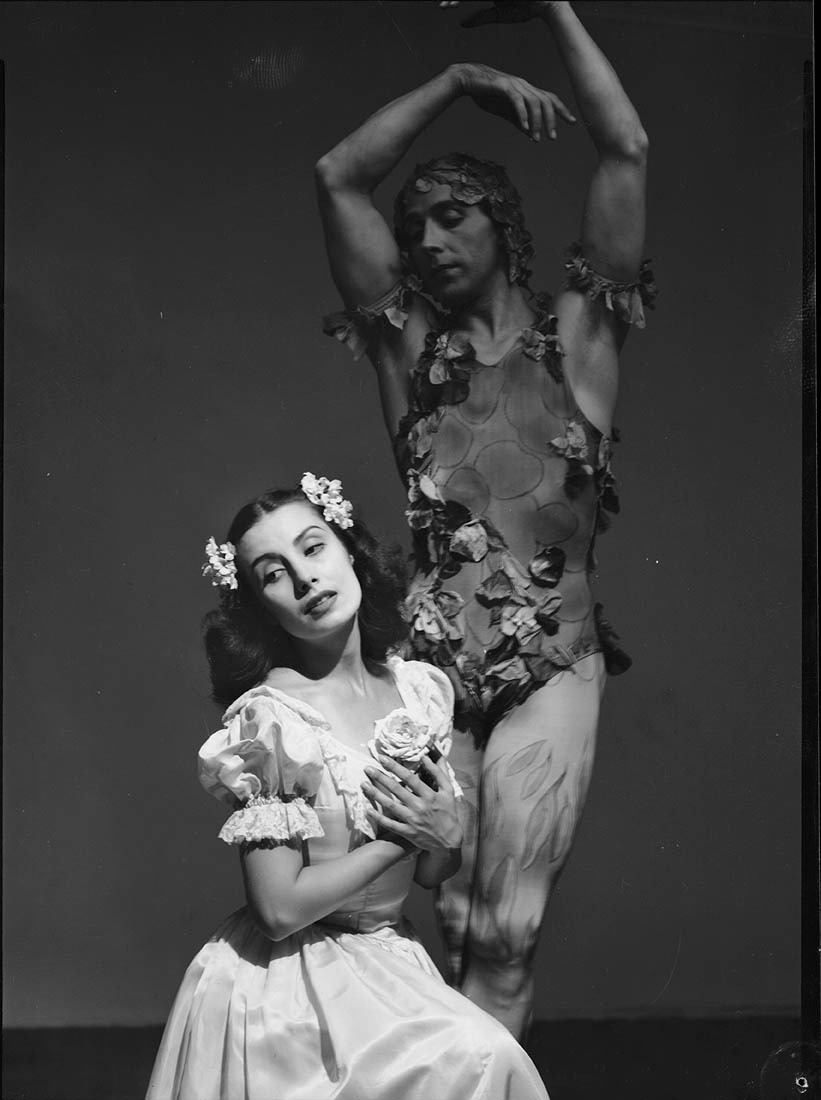
Toumanova in "Le Spectre de la Rose, 1940, by Max Dupain

=== Roles ===
- 1934: The Comet (cr) in Les Imaginaires (Lichine), de Basil's Ballets Russes, London Tarantella in La Boutique fantasque (revival; Massine), de Basil's Ballets Russes, London
  - The Miller's Wife in Le Tricorne (Massine), (de Basil's) Monte Carlo Ballet Russe, Chicago
  - The Mexican Girl (cr) in Union Pacific (Massine), (de Basil's) Monte Carlo Ballet Russe, Philadelphia
- 1935: The Poor Couple (cr) in Jardin public (Massine), (de Basil's) Monte Carlo Ballet Russe, Chicago
  - Principal dancer (cr) in Le Bal (Massine), (de Basil's) Monte Carlo Ballet, Chicago
- 1936: The Beloved (cr) in Symphonie fantastique (Massine), de Basil's Ballets Russes, London
- 1938: Title role in Giselle (after Petipa, Coralli, Perrot) (Denham's) Ballet Russe de Monte Carlo, London.
- 1940: Aurore (cr) in Le Mariage d'Aurore (Aurora's Wedding) (Petipa), Original Ballet Russe, Sydney
  - Illusion (cr) in La Lutte eternelle (Schwezoff), Original Ballet Russe, Sydney
  - Swanilda in Coppelia (Obukhov after Petipa, Saint-Leon), Original Ballet Russe, Sydney
- 1941: Third and Fourth Movements (cr) in Balustrade (Balanchine), Original Ballet Russe, New York
  - Ariadne (cr) in Labyrinth (Massine), Denham's Ballet Russe de Monte Carlo, New York
  - The Cakewalk (cr) in Saratoga (Massine), Denham's Ballet Russe de Monte Carlo, New York
- 1944: The Girl (cr) in Moonlight Sonata (Massine), Ballet Theatre, New York
  - Principal dancer (cr) in Harvest Time (Nijinska), Ballet Theatre, New York
  - Kitri in Don Quixote Pas de Deux (Obukhov after Petipa), Ballet Theatre. New York
- 1944–45: Sugar Plum Fairy in The Nutcracker Pas de deux (Dolin after Ivanov), Ballet Theatre, New York
  - Odile in Black Swan Pas de deux (Swan Lake, Act III; Dolin after Petipa), Ballet Theatre, New York
- 1947: Second Movement (cr) in Palais de cristal (later called Symphony in C; Balanchine), Paris Opera Ballet, Paris
  - Title role in Giselle (Sergeyev after Petipa, Coralli, Perrot), Paris Opera Ballet, Paris
- 1949: The Duchess (cr) in Del Amor y de la muerte (Ricarda), Grand Ballet du Marquis de Cuevas, Paris
  - The Infanta (cr) in Le Coeur de diamond (Lichine), Grand Ballet du Marquis de Cuevas, Monte Carlo
- 1950: Title role (cr) in Phedre (Serge Lifar), Paris Opera Ballet, Paris
  - Principal dancer (cr) in L'Inconnue (Lifar), Paris Opera Ballet, Paris
  - Principal dancer (cr) in La Fee d’Aibee (Aveline), Paris Opera Ballet, Versailles
  - Principal dancer (cr) in La Pierre enchantee (Lifar), Paris Opera Ballet, Paris
- 1951: Potiphar's Wife (cr) in Leggenda di Giuseppe (The Legend of Joseph; Wallmann), La Scala, Milan
  - Principal dancer (cr) in La Vita dell’uomo (Wallmann), La Scala, Milan
- 1952: Principal dancer (cr) in Reve (pas de deux; Dolin), London Festival Ballet, London
- 1956: Principal dancer (cr) in The Seven Deadly Sins (Char- rat), La Scala, Milan
  - The Dance of the Seven Veils (cr) in Salome (opera; mus. Strauss, chor. Toumanova), La Scala, Milan
  - Principal dancer (cr) in Epoque romantique (also chor.), Piccola Scala, Milan
  - The Princess (cr) in Le Fanfare pour le Prince (Taras), Celebration of the Marriage of Prince Rainier and Grace Kelly, Monte Carlo

=== In film ===
Toumanova appeared in six Hollywood films between 1944 and 1970, always playing dancers. She made her feature film debut in 1944, in Days of Glory, playing a Russian dancer being saved from the invading Germans in 1941 by Soviet partisan leader Gregory Peck (who also made his debut in that film).

In 1953, she played Russian prima ballerina Anna Pavlova in Tonight We Sing, and in 1954, she appeared in the biographical musical Deep in My Heart as the French dancer Gaby Deslys. In 1956, she performed a dance scene with Gene Kelly in Invitation to the Dance. In 1966, she played the unnamed lead ballerina in Alfred Hitchcock's political thriller Torn Curtain. In 1970, she played Russian ballerina Madame Petrova in Billy Wilder's The Private Life of Sherlock Holmes.

== Personal life ==
Some sources indicate that Tamara Toumanova was born Tamara Vladimirovna Khassidovitch in Siberia, while her mother, Princess Eugenia (later Eugenie) Dmitrievna Toumanova was fleeing Georgia in search of her husband (Vladimir Khassidovitch),).

Toumanova was of partial Georgian, Armenian and Polish descent. Singer Lyudmila Lopato, who personally knew Toumanova, wrote that "Tamara was of Armenian-Polish descent, not a Georgian Princess, as many people think". Tamara herself highlighted her Georgian heritage on many occasions – "I think he saw kinship with me, with my tristesse, with my being part Georgian."; "My mother, Evgeniya Toumanova, was a Georgian, a Chkheidze by birth, from Tbilisi. Sometimes she used to speak Georgian to me."; etc. This is further confirmed by her family's official documents in Georgia and the Russian Empire, including that of her maternal uncle Prince Zachary Dmitrievich Tumanov, whose ethnicity is stated as "Georgian". Tamara's parents were deeply religious. Tamara, her mother and her maternal grandmother, Princess Elizabeth Chkhedize, were Georgian/Russian Orthodox, while Toumanova's maternal grandfather Prince Dmitry Toumanov was a follower of the Armenian Apostolic Church.

Toumanova's parents had become separated during the Russian Revolution. She was 18 months old before the family reunited. The family escaped from Russia via Vladivostok.

In 1944, Toumanova married Casey Robinson, whom she met as the producer and screenwriter of Days of Glory, her first film. The union was childless. The couple divorced on 13 October 1955.

== Death ==
Toumanova died in Santa Monica, California, on 29 May 1996, aged 77, from undisclosed causes. Before her death, she gave her Preobrajenska costumes to the Vaganova Choreographic Museum in St. Petersburg, Russia. Her funeral was a high mass at the Russian Orthodox Holy Virgin Mary Cathedral, Los Angeles. She was buried next to her mother Princess Eugenie in Hollywood, Hollywood Forever Cemetery.

British choreographer John Gregory described Toumanova as a "remarkable artist – a great personality who never stopped acting. It is impossible to think of Russian ballet without her."

== Bibliography ==
- Sergei Denham Records of the Ballet Russe de Monte Carlo, circa 1936–1978 held by the Jerome Robbins Dance Division, New York Public Library for the Performing Arts
- Toumanova obituary, latimes.com, 31 May 1996.
- Уколова Ю. В. ТАМАРА ТУМАНОВА (1919–1996) «ЧЕРНАЯ ЖЕМЧУЖИНА РУССКОГО БАЛЕТА», ж. Вестник Академии русского балета им. А.Я. Вагановой. 2007; ISSN 1681-8962, No.18, pp. 279–91 (in Russian)
- Мейлах Михаил Борисович Эвтерпа, ты? Художественные заметки. Беседы с артистами русской эмиграции. Том 1. Балет ID 4251015 Изд.: Новое литературное обозрение ISBN 978-5-86793-629-7; 2008 г.-стр.65–77 (разговор с Тамарой Тумановой, 1992г.) (in Russian)
- Юрий Григорович ЗОЛОТОЕ ЯБЛОКО СЕРЖА ЛИФАРЯ. Последнее интервью выдающейся балерины XX века Тамары Тумановой Независимая газета №190, 10 October 1996. (in Russian)
- Francis Mason. "Tamara Toumanova (1919–1996)", Ballet Review 24-3 Fall 1996, pp. 34–62.
- TOUMANOVA, Tamara. International Dictionary of Ballet: VOL. 2 L–Z. (St James Press; 1993), pp. 1427–30; ISBN 1558620842/ISBN 9781558620841
- Tamara Tchinarova Tamara Toumanova. (Biography) Dancing times. July 1997, pp. 889–93.
- Anastos, Peter. "A conversation with Tamara Toumanova". Ballet review. v 11, no 4, Winter 1984, pp 33–57. Archived from the original on 18 December 2013.
- "Pas de Deux – Joseph Cornell turned his obsession with a prima ballerina into art", Smithsonian magazine (February 2007); retrieved 29 August 2012
- Калининский В., Как консул Франции узнал о великой балерине. Тюмень, «Красное знамя»: № 17 (7873) от 28.02.2014, стр.2 (in Russian)
- Ирина Мороз. Балерина Тамара Туманова: биография, работы в театре и кино
- Венди Лессер Портрет балерины. Глава из книги "The Amateur" (1999)
- Нехамкин Э. Тамара Туманова. Русские американцы. Нью-йоркская газета "Новый меридиан" No.1295 19 сентября 2018 года

== See also ==
- List of Russian ballet dancers
