= Le Bourgeois Gentilhomme (ballet) =

- Choreographer: George Balanchine
- Music: Richard Strauss
- Libretto: after Molière
- Based on: Molière's Le Bourgeois gentilhomme
- Premiere: 1932; Opéra de Monte-Carlo
- Original ballet company: Ballet Russe de Monte Carlo
- Characters: Mr. Jourdain; Lucille; Cléonte
- Design: Alexandre Benois
- Setting: 17th-century France
- Created for: David Lichine and Tamara Toumanova
- Genre: neoclassical ballet

Le Bourgeois Gentilhomme refers to two different ballets by George Balanchine set to Richard Strauss's Concert Suite (1917), with a libretto after Molière's 17th-century comédie-ballet of the same name.

The first Balanchine Le Bourgeois Gentilhomme ballet was produced in 1932 by the Ballets Russes de Monte-Carlo. In 1979, Balanchine (with the assistance of Jerome Robbins) created all-new choreography for Le Bourgeois Gentilhomme, which premiered on 8 April 1979, with the New York City Opera at the New York State Theater, Lincoln Center, in New York City. This production was notable for being the first ballet Balanchine ever choreographed for Rudolf Nureyev (who at the time was 41 years old).

== Performance history ==
=== Ballets Russes de Monte-Carlo ===
Balanchine's first Le Bourgeois Gentilhomme ballet was performed in 1932 by Wassily de Basil & René Blum's Ballets Russes de Monte-Carlo, featuring David Lichine and Tamara Toumanova, with sets by Alexandre Benois.

In 1944, the ballet was performed by the second iteration of the Ballet Russe de Monte Carlo, with Nicholas Magallanes (taking over for an injured Frederic Franklin), Maria Tallchief, and Nathalie Krassovska.

=== New York City Opera ===
Le Bourgeois Gentilhomme
- Choreographer: George Balanchine with Jerome Robbins
- Music: Richard Strauss
- Libretto: after Molière
- Based on: Molière's Le Bourgeois gentilhomme
- Premiere: April 8, 1979; New York State Theater, Lincoln Center
- Original ballet company: New York City Opera
- Characters: Mr. Jourdain; Lucille; Cléonte
- Design: Rouben Ter-Arutunian
- Setting: 17th-century France
- Created for: Rudolf Nureyev; Jean-Pierre Bonnefoux; Patricia McBride
- Genre: neoclassical ballet

The 1979 version of Le Bourgeois Gentilhomme included choreographic input from Jerome Robbins, who stepped in during a period of Balanchine's illness, as well as from Peter Martins, who choreographed one scene near the end of the ballet. By staging the ballet with the New York City Opera instead of Balanchine's customary New York City Ballet, the production was able to use Nureyev, who was not a member of NYCB. Costumes and sets were designed by Rouben Ter-Arutunian.

The premiere took place on 8 April 1979 at the New York State Theater, Lincoln Center, as part of a double bill with Henry Purcell's short opera Dido and Aeneas.

1979 opening night cast:

- Jean-Pierre Bonnefoux — Mr. Jourdain
- Rudolf Nureyev — Cléonte
- Patricia McBride — Lucille
- Darla Hoover
- Michael Puleo
- students of the School of American Ballet

On 22 May 1980, the New York City Ballet produced the ballet at the New York State Theater, featuring Frank Ohman, Suzanne Farrell, Peter Martins, Heather Watts, and Victor Castelli.
