= Ballet Russe =

Ballet russe is French for Russian ballet.

Ballet Russe may also refer to:

- Ballets Russes, an itinerant ballet company based in Paris that performed between 1909 and 1929 throughout Europe and on tours to North and South America
- Original Ballet Russe, originally named Ballets Russes de Monte-Carlo, a ballet company established in 1931 as a successor to the Ballets Russes; closed in 1947
- Ballet Russe de Monte-Carlo, a ballet company created by members of the Ballets Russes de Monte Carlo in 1937; closed in 1968
- Ballets Russes (film), an American 2005 feature documentary about the dancers of the Ballet Russe de Monte Carlo
