= Irina Baronova =

Russian ballerina and actress (1919–2008)

Irina Baronova FRAD
- Ирина Баронова
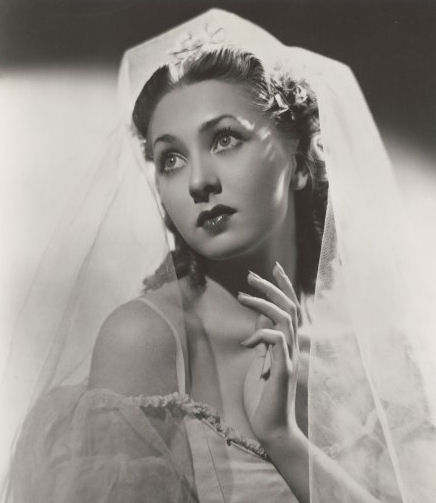
- Baronova, c. 1937
- Born: Irina Mikhailovna Baronova; 13 March 1919; Petrograd, Russia
- Died: 28 June 2008 (aged 89); Byron Bay, New South Wales, Australia
- Occupation: Ballerina
- Spouses: German Sevastianov (divorced) Cecil Tennant (died 1967)
- Children: 3, including Victoria Tennant

Irina Mikhailovna Baronova FRAD (Russian: Ирина Михайловна Баронова; 13 March 1919 – 28 June 2008) was a Russian ballerina and actress who was one of the Baby Ballerinas of the Ballet Russe de Monte Carlo, discovered by George Balanchine in Paris in the 1930s. She created roles in Léonide Massine's Le Beau Danube (1924), Jeux d'enfants (1932), and Les Présages (1933); and in Bronislava Nijinska's Les Cent Baisers (1935).

== Biography ==
Baronova was born in Saint Petersburg (then known as Petrograd) in 1919, the daughter of a lieutenant in the Imperial Navy, Mikhail Baronov, and his wife Lidia (née Vishniakova). In November 1920, the Baronov family escaped the Russian Revolution by dressing as peasants and crossing the border into Romania. After first arriving in Curtea de Argeș, Romania, the family eventually settled in Bucharest. Irina's father found work at a factory and, for the next several years, the Baronov family lived in the slums surrounding the various factories where Mikhail was employed.

Irina's mother, who loved the ballet and had often attended the theatre in Saint Petersburg, found a ballet teacher in Bucharest for Irina. In 1927, at the age of seven, Irina began taking her first ballet lessons from a former corps de ballet member of the Mariinsky Theatre Ballet.

When Baronova was 10 years old, the family moved to Paris to provide her with professional training. She was taught by Olga Preobrajenska. She also studied with fellow ballerina Mathilde Kschessinska. Baronova made her debut aged 11 at the Paris Opera in 1930.

In 1932, Baronova, along with two other girls, Tamara Toumanova (aged 12), and Tatiana Riabouchinska (aged 14), were hired by George Balanchine to become ballerinas in the newly formed Ballets Russes de Monte-Carlo. During their first season in London with the Ballets Russes, English critic Arnold Haskell coined the term "Baby Ballerinas" for Toumanova, Riabouchinska and Baronova.

Baronova's first principal role was Odette in Swan Lake, partnered by Anton Dolin, which she performed at 14 years old.

At age 17, she eloped with a Jerry Sevastianov. Two years later, they married in Sydney, Australia, where she was on tour. She then joined the Ballet Theatre in the USA, under the patronage of Sol Hurok. She and Sevastianov divorced. While in Britain in 1946, she met the agent Cecil Tennant, who asked her to marry him with the condition that she gave up ballet; she agreed and retired.

Between 1940 and 1951, Baronova appeared in several films, including Ealing Studios Train of Events (1949) and worked as ballet mistress for the 1980 film Nijinsky.

Baronova and Tennant had three children, including Victoria. Through Victoria, she became the mother-in-law of Steve Martin. In 2014, Victoria published a pictorial biography of her mother's life entitled Irina Baronova and the Ballets Russes de Monte Carlo.

In 1967, Cecil Tennant was killed in a car accident, and Baronova moved to Switzerland. Later, she remarried her first husband, Jerry Sevastianov, who died in 1974. She returned to teaching classes in the United Kingdom and United States in 1976. Margot Fonteyn asked her to conduct a training course for teachers. In 1986, she staged Fokine's Les Sylphides for The Australian Ballet. In 1992, she returned to Russia to help the Mariinsky Theatre with an archival project. In 1996, she received a Vaslav Nijinsky Medal from Poland and an honorary doctorate from the North Carolina School of the Arts.

Baronova was vice president and a fellow of the Royal Academy of Dance (FRAD). She was a patron of the Australian Ballet School.

== Death ==
Only five weeks before her death, she spoke at a symposium in Adelaide, South Australia, on the Ballets Russes' tours of Australia. She died in her sleep at Byron Bay on 28 June 2008.

== Filmography ==
Year	Production	Role	Notes
1940	Florian	Trina	
1943	Toast of Love	Dancer	
1949	Train of Events	Irina Nozorova	
1951	Toast to Love	Yolanda Petrova	
1980	Nijinsky	Ballet Mistress	Miscellaneous crew
2004	Ballets Russes	Herself	Documentary

== See also ==
- List of Russian ballet dancers
