= Nina Verchinina =

Russian-born ballet dancer, teacher and choreographer

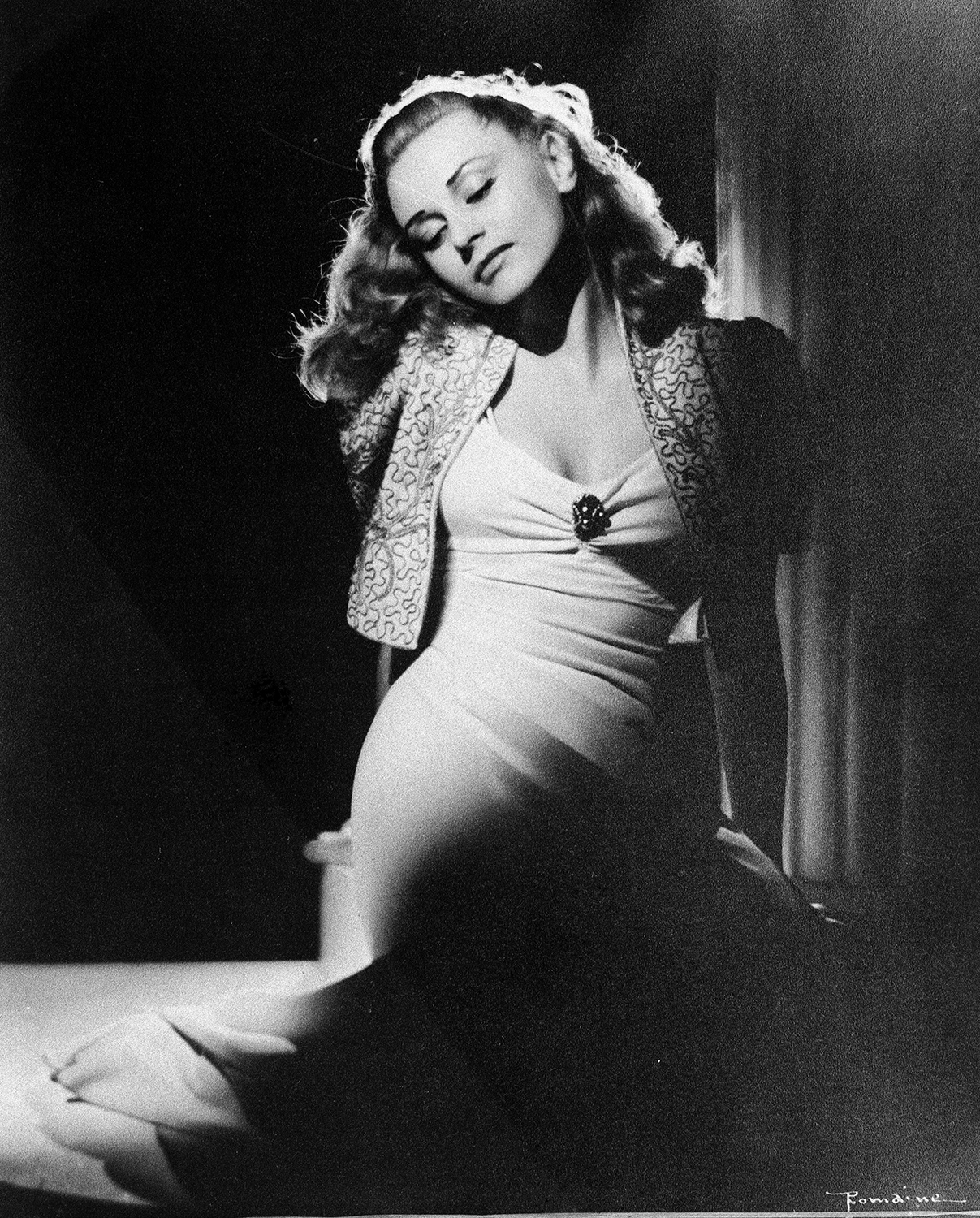
- Nina Verchinina in 1939-1940
- Born: 20 January 1910; Moscow, Russian Empire
- Died: 16 December 1995 (aged 85); Copacabana, Rio de Janeiro, Brazil
- Occupations: Ballet dancer, choreographer, teacher
- Spouse: Count Jean de Beausacq

Nina Verchinina (20 January 1910 – 16 December 1995) was a Russian-born ballet dancer, teacher and choreographer known for blending expressive classical dance with modern influences.

== Early life ==
Verchinina was born in 1910 in Moscow and spent her childhood in Shanghai before moving to Paris as a teenager. In Paris she trained with prominent teachers, including Olga Preobrajenska and Bronislava Nijinska, and studied the movement theories of Rudolf von Laban, which broadened her stylistic range and helped form the distinctive fluidity of her arm and torso work.

== Career ==
Verchinina made her stage debut with the Ida Rubinstein company in 1929. She joined the Ballets Russes de Monte Carlo in 1932 and remained with the troupe in its various formations throughout the 1930s under the direction of René Blum, Leonide Massine and Col. W. de Basil. Massine created major roles for her in his large-scale symphonic ballets Les Présages, Choreartium and Symphonie fantastique, and her dynamic style drew strong critical praise from contemporary critics.

Alongside her classical repertoire, Verchinina performed character roles including Chiarina in Le Carnaval and parts in Le Beau Danube, Le Soleil de Nuit and Prince Igor. She also worked in San Francisco and across South America while developing her choreographic interests.

Verchinina toured Australia in 1939–40 with de Basil's Original Ballet Russe. She arrived on the SS Orcades in Sydney on 18 December 1939. Renowned locally for her role as Action in Massine's Les Présages, she performed as a leading dancer of the troupe before she departed for the United States aboard the SS Monterey on 20 September 1940.

During the Second World War Verchinina built a significant reputation in Cuba and South America while maintaining ties with de Basil. After the war she returned to Europe to tour, and in 1946–47 served as ballet mistress at the Teatro Municipal in Rio de Janeiro, which later became her long-term home.

In the late 1940s and early 1950s Verchinina founded several companies, including one touring Spain in 1949 and another, Ballet Nina Verchinina, in Rio. She choreographed for institutions in Argentina and Brazil, creating ballets such as Pastoral Symphony, Narcisse, Rhapsody in Blue and Salome. She later established a studio in Copacabana and continued teaching internationally.

== Later life and death ==
Verchinina lived in Rio de Janeiro for the rest of her life and remained professionally active into old age. She died of a heart attack at her home in Copacabana on 16 December 1995.
