= Les Ballets 1933 =

General information
- Name: Les Ballets 1933
- Year founded: 1933
- Closed: September 1933
- Founders: Boris Kochno and George Balanchine
- Principal venue: Théâtre des Champs-Élysées (Paris); Savoy Theatre (London)

Senior staff
- Company manager: Edward James

Artistic staff
- Artistic director: Boris Kochno
- Resident choreographers: George Balanchine

Les Ballets 1933 was a ballet company started by Boris Kochno and George Balanchine, which Balanchine used to create new works that were completely his own, set to music that no one had yet choreographed. The company ran for less than four weeks in 1933 and tailored itself to small, wealthy audiences in Paris (the Théâtre des Champs-Élysées) and London (Savoy Theatre), but despite its scale, it came out with works that Balanchine later used to instruct at his School of American Ballet, and in the programs of his later companies. Outside a theatre for Les Ballets, Balanchine first met Lincoln Kirstein.

== History ==
Kochno and Balanchine came directly out of the Ballets Russes de Monte-Carlo, owned by René Blum and Colonel W. de Basil, for which Kochno had been the librettist and Balanchine the choreographer, until de Basil dismissed them both. Tamara Toumanova, a dancer and a strong admirer of Balanchine, followed the collaborators from the Ballets Russes, and remained a great inspiration for Balanchine. At first afraid to not find funding, Kochno and Balanchine relied on a few contributions from friends, including Coco Chanel and Cole Porter. Quickly, however, they found themselves in the hands of young and affable Edward James, husband of Tilly Losch, a dancer trained at the Vienna Opera Ballet who specialized in character and exotic roles. As James became head patron (without his money the ballet wouldn't have been able to run for its season), Losch became a head dancer and it was "her" ballet company. James, who received little admiration from Losch, hoped that he could gain her love by ensuring that direct relationship.

When Les Ballets opened, it found itself in the midst of mixed reviews. Some thought the company youthful, on account of Balanchine; others thought it extravagant. Even Kirstein was skeptical, as he decided that Balanchine was "no Fokine." Overall, most of the reviews were bad, and the ballet ended its season with no profit. Tensions between performers heightened, and the ballet needed to close. However, the ballet's end did bring about the start of the American Ballet, as Kirstein met Balanchine, and brought the choreographer to the United States.

== Notable figures and works ==
Dancers for Les Ballets included Tamara Toumanova, Tamara Tchinarova, Diana Gould, Pearl Argyle, Prudence Hyman, Elizabeth Schooling, and Betty Cuff. The popular singer was Lotte Lenya. Composers ranged from Kurt Weill to Tchaikovsky, and designs were notable, with costumes by Barbara Karinska. Kochno built elaborate decorations for the ballets. One critic described the magnitude of the art in a green dress in the ballet, which Losch wore, as having an “atmospheric beauty."

Les Ballets produced six new ballets, each with a score by a different composer:

- L'Errante (Franz Schubert) — lighting by Pavel Tchelitchew; Losch performed as head dancer
- Fastes (Henri Sauguet) — Toumanova featured
- Mozartiana (Pyotr Ilyich Tchaikovsky) — Toumanova featured; most enduring of the company's ballets; in 1956, the Danilova company reproduced it
- Les sept péchés capitaux ("The Seven Deadly Sins") (Kurt Weill) — libretto by Bertolt Brecht (Weill and Brecht's last collaboration); Losch performed as head dancer, and Lotte Lenya sang
- Les songes (Darius Milhaud) — Toumanova featured
- Les valses de Beethoven (Ludwig van Beethoven)

All the ballets premiered in early June 1933 at the Théâtre des Champs-Élysées, Paris, and in late June at the Savoy Theatre, London.

== See also ==
- Ballets Russes
- Original Ballet Russe
- Ballet Russe de Monte Carlo
