= Baby Ballerinas =

Baby ballerinas is a term invented by the English writer and dance critic Arnold Haskell to describe three young dancers of the Ballets Russes de Monte-Carlo in the early 1930s: Irina Baronova (1919–2008), Tamara Toumanova (1919–1996), and Tatiana Riabouchinska (1917–2000).

== Background ==
Children of the Russian exile community in Paris, established after the revolution of 1917, the three girls were discovered by George Balanchine in 1931 in the studios of two former ballerinas of the Russian Imperial Ballet. Baronova and Toumanova were pupils of Olga Preobrajenska; Riabouchinska was a protégée of Mathilde Kschessinska. Impressed by their remarkable talent, and cognizant that each of them had had some performing experience, Balanchine chose them to dance in a new company that was then being formed by René Blum and Colonel Wassily de Basil and of which he was to be chief choreographer, Les Ballets Russes de Monte Carlo.

During their first season with the company, in the spring of 1932, Baronova and Toumanova were 12 years old, and Riabouchinska was 14. All three were cast in important roles in ballets in the company repertory. Toumanova had particular success, creating roles in four new ballets by Balanchine—Cotillon, La Concurrence, Le Bourgeois Gentilhomme, and Suite des Danses. Baronova and Riabouchinska also won applause and acclaim. The extreme youth and technical perfection of these "baby ballerinas" won them fame not only in Monte Carlo, France, and England but in other countries around the world.

== Modern use ==
The term "baby ballerinas" has also been used to refer to other ballet ingenues. In 2019, Dance Magazine used the term to describe teenagers Maria Khoreva, Daria Ionova, and Anastasia Nuykina, who were picked to star in Balanchine's Apollo at the Mariinsky Theatre despite still being students at the Vaganova Academy.
