= David Lichine =

Russian-American ballet dancer and choreographer (1910–1972)

- Дэвид (Давид) Лишин
- Born: Deivid Lichtenstein; October 25, 1910; Rostov-on-Don, Russia
- Died: June 26, 1972 (aged 61); Los Angeles, California, U.S.
- Occupations: Dancer; choreographer; teacher
- Years active: 1928–1972
- Spouse(s): Lubov Rostova (m. 1933, divorced) Tatiana Riabouchinska (m. 1943–1972)

David Lichine (Russian: Дэвид (Давид) Лишин; 25 October 1910 – 26 June 1972) was a Russian-American ballet dancer and choreographer. He had an international career as a performer, ballet master, and choreographer, staging works for many ballet companies and for several Hollywood film studios.

== Early years ==
He was born in Rostov-on-Don in southern Russia as David Likhtenshteyn (Russian: Давид Лихтенштейн). After the October Revolution in 1917, his family left Soviet Russia and eventually settled in Paris, along with many other Russian emigres. Their surname became fixed as Lichine, in the French style.

As a teenager, David began his ballet training with the leading Russian expatriate teachers in the city, including Lubov Egorova, Pierre Vladimiroff, and Bronislava Nijinska. Progressing quickly, he made his professional debut at age eighteen with Ida Rubenstein's company in 1928. He later danced with companies headed by Anna Pavlova, Nijinska, and others. His technical finesse and beauty of face and form soon made him an audience favorite.

== Professional career ==
In the re-formation of Russian ballet companies after the death of Serge Diaghilev, Lichine became a charter member of Ballets Russes de Monte-Carlo, founded in January 1932 by Col. Wassily de Basil, René Blum, and Serge Grigoriev. As a principal dancer, Lichine stayed with de Basil's company from its inception until 1941, headlining the company through all its subsequent renamings, which finally ended as Original Ballet Russe in 1939. During his years with the company, Lichine danced in many ballets, creating roles in George Balanchine's Cotillion, Le Bourgeois Gentilhomme, and Suites de Danse (all, 1932) and Léonide Massine's Jeux d'enfants (1932), Choreartium (1933), Les Présages (1933), and Union Pacific (1934). A versatile and engaging demi-caractère dancer, he is also remembered for a brilliant rendition of Petipa's fluttering Bluebird in Aurora's Wedding and for a sensual portrayal of the title role in Nijinsky's L'Après-midi d'un Faune.

In 1933, Lichine married Lubov Rostova, a dancer in the de Basil company, but their union was soon dissolved. That same year, he made his choreographic debut with Nocturne, set to music of Jean-Philippe Rameau. This would prove to be the first of a long list of choreographic works staged over the years. Of them all, he is chiefly known for Graduation Ball (1940), a lighthearted work that is still widely performed today, more than sixty years after its creation.

During the years of World War II in Europe, Lichine and his second wife, ballerina Tatiana Riabouchinska, remained mostly in the United States, performing with Ballet Theatre (later renamed American Ballet Theatre). They also found occasional work in New York City and Hollywood. On Broadway, Lichine choreographed dances for the short-lived Beat the Band (1942), after which he directed and choreographed the operetta Rhapsody (1944), with music by Fritz Kriesler. His ballet numbers for this show earned high praise from the critics, but the show was a flop, closing after only thirteen performances. He had not much better luck with the operetta Polonaise (1945), set to the music of Chopin, which lasted longer but was panned by the critics.

After the war, Lichine returned to the Original Ballet Russe for various seasons (1946–1948). In the spring of 1946, his biblical ballet Cain and Abel had its premiere in Mexico City. In the summer of 1947, he and Riabouchinska enjoyed an enthusiastic reception by both audiences and critics in a new production of Graduation Ball in London. In 1947, he was also working at the Teatro Colón in Buenos Aires as choreographer and principal dancer. He staged works for a number of companies in western Europe, including Les Ballets des Champs-Élysées, Le Grand Ballet du Marquis de Cuevas, London Festival Ballet, and the Deutsche Oper Berlin.

Throughout the 1940s, Lichine frequently worked in Hollywood on movie musicals and had considerable success, both as performer and choreographer. He can be seen as a specialty dancer in The Heat's On and Something to Shout About (both 1943) and as Eleanor Powell's boogie partner in Sensations of 1945, released in 1944. He and Riabouchinska, who had served as dance models for Ben Ali Gator and Hyacinth Hippo in the "Dance of the Hours" ballet sequence of Fantasia (1940), were hired by Walt Disney once again for Make Mine Music (1946). They give a charming performance in the "Two Silhouettes" sequence. As a choreographer, Lichine's first movie was Spring Night (1935), a remarkable short film in which he dances with Nana Gollner. The ballet sequences for Cyd Charisse in The Unfinished Dance (1947) are generally considered his best work for the movie camera.

In 1955, Lichine was invited by Edouard Borovansky to return to Australia to stage a full-length Nutcracker for the Borovansky Ballet for its 1955–1956 season. Lichine had first visited Australia with the Covent Garden Russian Ballet (Original Ballet Russe) on their Australian tour of 1938–1939. Lichine's Nutcracker, a ballet that became a staple Christmas treat for Australian audiences for many years, premiered on 16 December 1955 with Peggy Sager as the Sugar Plum Fairy and Royes Fernandez as the Prince. During his visit to Australia, Lichine was also commissioned to create an original ballet. The result was Corrida, which had first been workshopped in Lichine's Los Angeles studio in 1952. Its world premiere as a fully realized production was on 17 February 1956, with the lead roles performed by Kathleen Gorham and Paul Grinwis.

In 1953, Lichine and Riabouchinska settled in Los Angeles, where they opened a ballet school and for some time also directed a performing group, the Los Angeles Ballet Theatre. She continued to teach at the school after his death in 1972, at the age of sixty-one.

== Major works ==
- 1935: Spring Night (short film; music, Achron)
- 1937: Francesca da Rimini (music, Tchaikovsky)
- 1938: Protée (music, Debussy)
- 1938: The Prodigal Son (music, Prokofiev)
- 1940: Graduation Ball (music, J. Strauss, arr. Dorati)
- 1942: Helen of Troy (completing Fokine's work; music, Offenbach)
- 1943: The Fair at Sorochinsk (music, Mussorgsky)
- 1946: Cain and Abel (music, Wagner)
- 1947: Evolución del Movimiento (music, Franck)
- 1948: La Rencontre, ou Oedipe et le Sphinx (music, Sauget)

== See also ==
- List of Russian ballet dancers
