= Boris Kochno =

Russian ballet dancer (1904–1990)

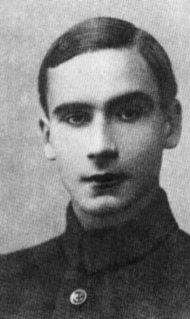
- Born: 3 January 1904; Moscow, Russia
- Died: 8 December 1990 (aged 86); Paris, France
- Resting place: Père Lachaise Cemetery
- Education: Imperial Lyceum
- Known for: Les Ballets 1933

Boris Evgenievich Kochno or Kokhno (Russian: Бори́с Евге́ньевич Кохно́; 3 January 1904 – 8 December 1990) was a Russian poet, dancer, and librettist.

== Early life ==
Kochno was born in Moscow, Russia, on 3 January 1904. His father served as a colonel in the hussars. He studied at the Imperial Lyceum in Moscow before emigrating to Paris in 1920.

== Career ==
He was close with Karol Szymanowski, who gave him as a gift a Russian translation of the chapter The Symposium from his unpublished novel Efebos. Szymanowski also dedicated four poems to him. In 1920 he became Sergei Diaghilev's secretary, librettist, and eventually main collaborator. They were also briefly lovers. Kochno wrote the libretto of Stravinsky's Mavra (1921), George Auric's Les Fâcheux (1924), Henri Sauguet's La Chatte (1927), and of Sergei Prokofiev's ballet score The Prodigal Son (1929). He also wrote a libretto for Massin's ballet Jeux d'enfants to Georges Bizet music (1932).

Upon Diaghilev's death, Kochno and Serge Lifar tried but failed to hold the Ballets Russes together. The two inherited part of Diaghilev's archives and collections, which Kochno completed and part of which was acquired by the Bibliothèque nationale de France. In 1933 he co-founded, together with George Balanchine, the short-lived but history-making company Les Ballets 1933, which made its debut that summer at the Théâtre des Champs-Élysées. That same year, he and Edward James commissioned Brecht and Weill's last collaboration, The Seven Deadly Sins, which Balanchine produced, directed, and choreographed.

At the end of World War II, Kochno entered into a partnership with Roland Petit, with whom he founded the Ballets des Champs-Élysées.

His later career included a position as ballet director with the Ballet Russe de Monte Carlo, where he became an influential figure in post-World War II French ballet.

Kochno authored several works, including Diaghilev and the Ballets Russes, a record of the Diaghilev era, and Christian Bérard, a scrapbook of artwork by Bérard, Kochno's former lover and collaborator, along with reminiscences.

== Personal life ==
In 1925 Kochno had a "passionate affair" with American composer and songwriter Cole Porter, with whom he carried on a lengthy correspondence, as well as Porter's friend, the American diplomat and heir, Hermann Oelrichs Jr., a son of Hermann and Theresa Fair Oelrichs. Today, two of Oelrichs's handwritten love letters to Kochno are in the National Library of France, which "leave no doubt that the two had a sexual relationship."

He died on 8 December 1990 in Paris following a fall. He was buried in the Père Lachaise cemetery in Paris, next to Wladimir Augenblick (1911–2001).

== Literature ==
- Lifar, Serge (2013). Serge Diaghilev. Read Books. ISBN 9781446546949.
