= Sol Hurok =

Russian-American impresario (1888–1974)

- Соломон Израилевич Гурков
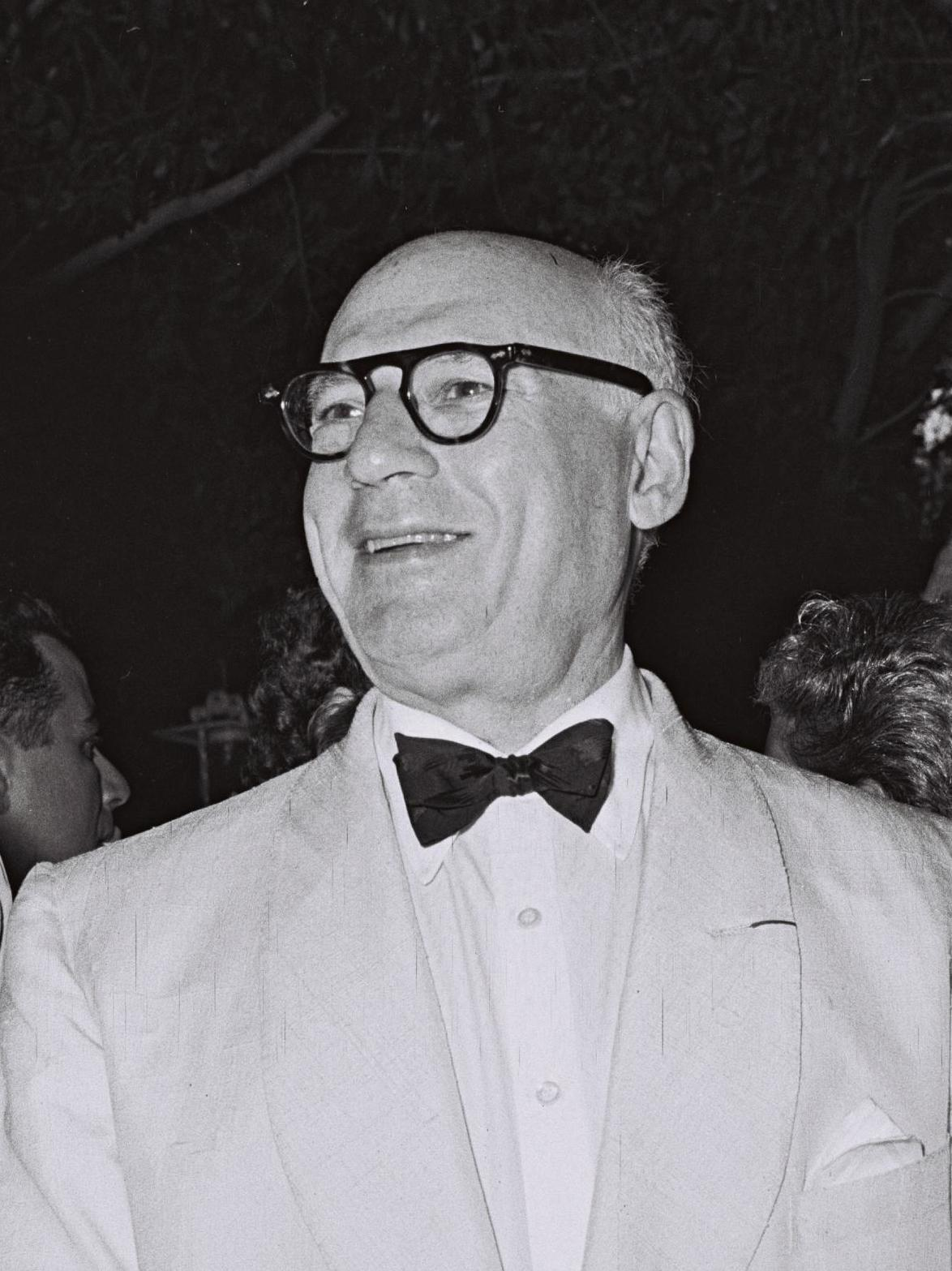
- Hurok in 1954
- Born: Solomon Izrailevich Gurkov; April 9, 1888; Pogar, Chernigov Governorate, Russian Empire
- Died: March 5, 1974 (aged 85); New York City, US
- Occupation: Impresario

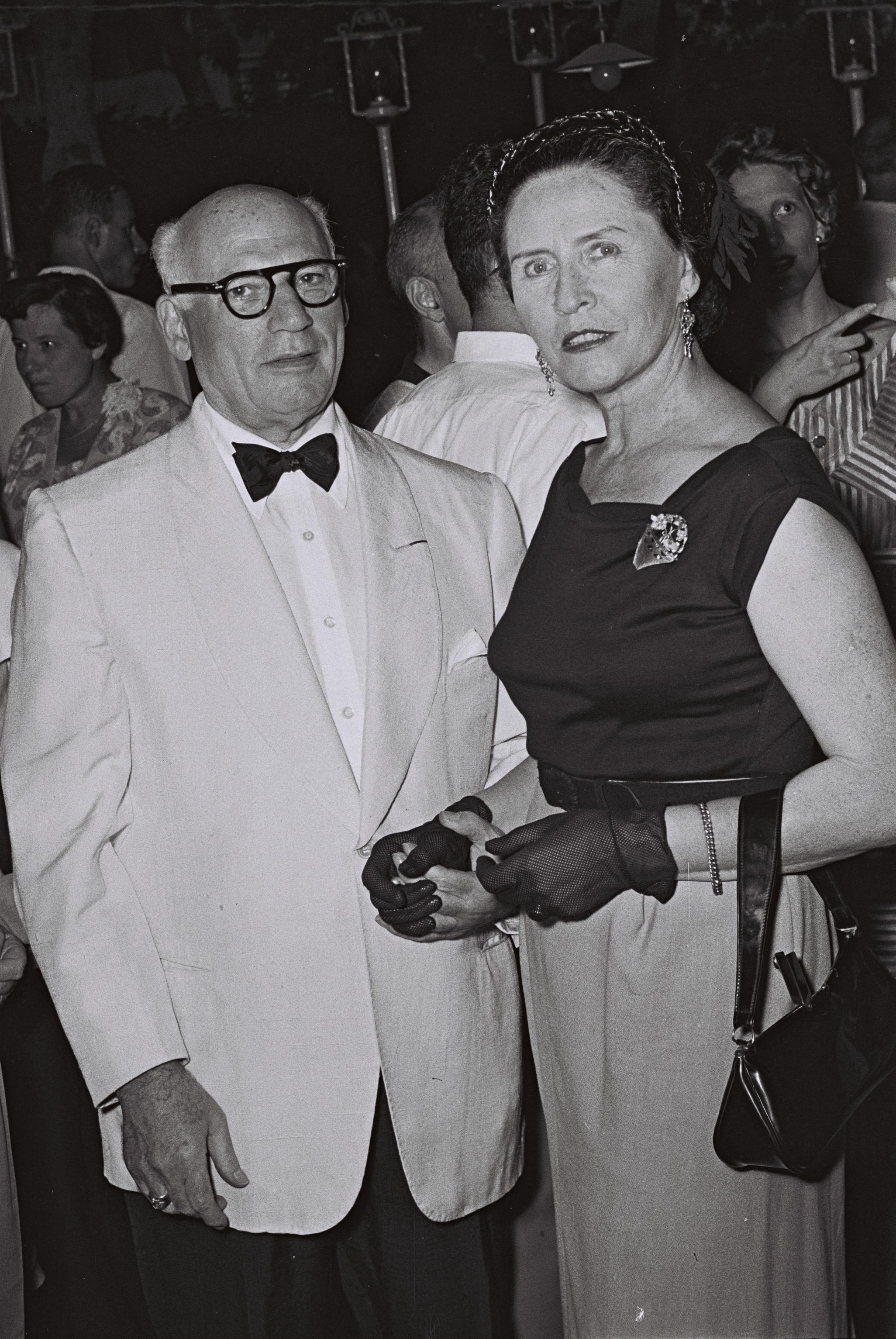
Hurok with actress Hanna Rovina, 1954

Sol Hurok (also Solomon Israilevich Hurok; born Solomon Izrailevich Gurkov, Russian Соломон Израилевич Гурков; April 9, 1888 – March 5, 1974) was a 20th-century American impresario.

== Early life ==
Hurok was born in Pogar, Chernigov Governorate, Russian Empire (in present-day Bryansk Oblast, Russia) in 1888. His father, Israel Hurok, was a hardware merchant. At age 17, he was sent to Kharkiv to learn the trade. Shortly thereafter, in 1906, he immigrated to the United States, becoming a naturalized citizen in 1914. Sol and girl friend Tamara (Mary) Shapiro had arrived in New York City together in 1906 and married in 1908. The 1910 Census shows him working as a hardware salesman, likely with his father, while living in Brooklyn with Tamara and their year-old daughter Ruth, who would be the couple's only child.

== Career ==
During Hurok's long career, S. Hurok Presents managed many performing artists, including Jules Bledsoe, Marian Anderson, Irina Arkhipova, Vladimir Ashkenazy, Grace Bumbry, Feodor Chaliapin, Nestor Mesta Chayres, Van Cliburn, Victoria de los Ángeles, Manuela del Río, Isadora Duncan, Katherine Dunham, Michel Fokine, Margot Fonteyn, Emil Gilels, Alexander Glazunov, Horacio Gutiérrez, Daniel Heifetz, Jerome Hines, Isa Kremer, Moura Lympany, Arturo Benedetti Michelangeli, David Oistrakh, Anna Pavlova, Jan Peerce, Sviatoslav Richter, Mstislav Rostropovich, Arthur Rubinstein, Andrés Segovia, Isaac Stern, Galina Vishnevskaya, Régine, Ralph Votapek, Efrem Zimbalist, Mariemma and many others.

In the early 1920s, opportunities for Black singers, especially Black male singers, were nearly non-existent on the concert or operatic stage. Most of the few who found any success did so by traveling to Europe to establish a professional career. Jules Bledsoe was an exception: he was able to sign with Hurok. With Hurok's sponsorship, Bledsoe made his professional singing debut in New York's Aeolian Hall on Easter Sunday, April 20, 1924.

In 1935, Rubinstein introduced Hurok to singer Marian Anderson, who retained Hurok as her manager for the rest of her career. A few years later, with Walter White of the NAACP and First Lady Eleanor Roosevelt, Hurok was instrumental in persuading U.S. Secretary of the Interior Harold L. Ickes to arrange Anderson's Easter Sunday open-air concert on the steps of the Lincoln Memorial on April 9, 1939.

Beginning in the late 1930s Hurok managed Colonel W. de Basil's Original Ballet Russe, as well as its offshoot rival company, Sergei J. Denham's The Ballet Russe de Monte Carlo. They often performed near each other, and Hurok hoped to reunite the companies, but ultimately was unsuccessful.

In 1959, after 35 years of effort, Sol Hurok brought the Soviet Bolshoi Ballet to the United States for an eight-week performance tour. In 1961, he brought the Kirov Academy of Ballet and the Igor Moiseyev Ballet Company to the U.S. In 1962, he again brought the Bolshoi to the U.S. for a tour at the height of the Cuban Missile Crisis.

The First Moog Quartet, the first to perform electronic music in Carnegie Hall, was formed in 1970 in response to Hurok's request to hear the Moog synthesizer in a live concert.

In honor of Hurok's influence on American music, on December 4, 1971, he was awarded the University of Pennsylvania Glee Club Award of Merit. Beginning in 1964, this award was "established to bring a declaration of appreciation to an individual each year that has made a significant contribution to the world of music and helped to create a climate in which our talents may find valid expression."

In 1972, a bomb planted in Hurok's Manhattan office exploded, killing employee Iris Kones and injuring several others, including Hurok. Two members of Jewish Defense League, a far-right terrorist organization which opposed the U.S. tours of artists from the Soviet Union, were charged but the cases were ultimately dismissed.

== Family ==
In 1935, after some 27 years of marriage, Hurok divorced his wife Mary and married Emma Borisovna Perper, a concert pianist and "glamorous Russian cabaret performer who was both a widow and a divorcee. At the time of Emma's death just a few months after Sol Hurok's in 1974, the couple had been separated for many years."Daughter Ruth Hurok married press agent Barry Hyams, and both of their children also became prominent figures in the entertainment industry: Nessa Hyams and Peter Hyams. Ruth's second marriage, which lasted 45 years, was to blacklisted conductor and voice teacher Arthur Lief. Sol Hurok's grandson--the son of Peter Hyams--John Hyams is also a film director.

== Death ==
In 1974, en route to a meeting with David Rockefeller to discuss a Rudolf Nureyev project, Hurok died of a heart attack. More than two thousand people nearly filled Carnegie Hall for his funeral, where Marian Anderson delivered the final eulogy.

"He didn't have the musical understanding of a scholar or specialist," Russian pianist Alexander Slobodyanik, another Hurok discovery, told me. "But he had a sixth sense for the aura surrounding an artist, the aura of success or the ability to interest an audience. And after all, most people in a concert audience don't have any special education either. Like Hurok, they just have hearts."

— Harlow Robinson, "Sol Hurok: America's dance impresario."

== Cultural depictions ==
- Tonight We Sing, musical biopic film by Mitchell Leisen; portrayed by David Wayne (1953)
- Anna Pavlova, film by Emil Loteanu; portrayed by John Murray (1983).
