= Ballets Russes (film) =

- Directed by: Dayna Goldfine; Dan Geller
- Written by: Dan Geller; Dayna Goldfine; Celeste Schaefer Snyder; Gary Weimberg
- Produced by: Dayna Goldfine; Dan Geller
- Starring: Irina Baronova; Tatiana Riabouchinska; George Zoritch; Alicia Markova; Yvonne Chouteau
- Narrated by: Marian Seldes
- Cinematography: Dan Geller
- Edited by: Dan Geller; Dayne Goldfine; Gary Weimberg
- Music by: Todd Boekelheide; David Conte
- Release dates: January 2005 (Sundance); October 26, 2005 (New York)
- Running time: 118 minutes
- Country: United States
- Language: English

Ballets Russes is a 2005 American feature documentary film about the dancers of the Ballet Russe de Monte-Carlo, which split into the Ballet Russe de Monte-Carlo and the Original Ballet Russe.

By showing clips of performances and interviews (recorded in about 2000) with several principal dancers from each troupe, it follows the history of the two troupes over decades. Alicia Markova, George Zoritch, and Tatiana Riabouchinska, Tamara Tchinarova were among the dancers featured. It was narrated by Marian Seldes. It is distributed by Zeitgeist Films.

== Dancers ==
Dancers appearing in the film include:

- Alan Howard
- Alicia Markova
- Frederic Franklin
- George Zoritch
- Irina Baronova
- Marc Platt
- Maria Tallchief
- Mia Slavenska
- Miguel Terekhov
- Nathalie Krassovska
- Nina Novak
- Nini Theilade
- Raven Wilkinson
- Rochelle Zide
- Tamara Tchinarova
- Tatiana Riabouchinska
- Tatiana Stepanova
- Wakefield Poole
- Yvonne Chouteau
- Yvonne Craig

== Reception ==
On review aggregator website Rotten Tomatoes, the film holds an approval rating of 91% based on 58 reviews, with an average rating of 7.8/10.

== Awards ==
Ballets Russes was nominated for Best Documentary at the 2005 Gotham Awards, and winner of the Audience Award for Best Documentary at the 2005 Hamptons International Film Festival. The film came third in the Best Nonfiction Picture category at the National Society of Film Critics Awards 2005, and second in the Top Five Documentaries category at the National Board of Review Awards 2005.
