= Tatiana Riabouchinska =

Russian-American ballerina (1917–2000)

- Татьяна Рябушинская
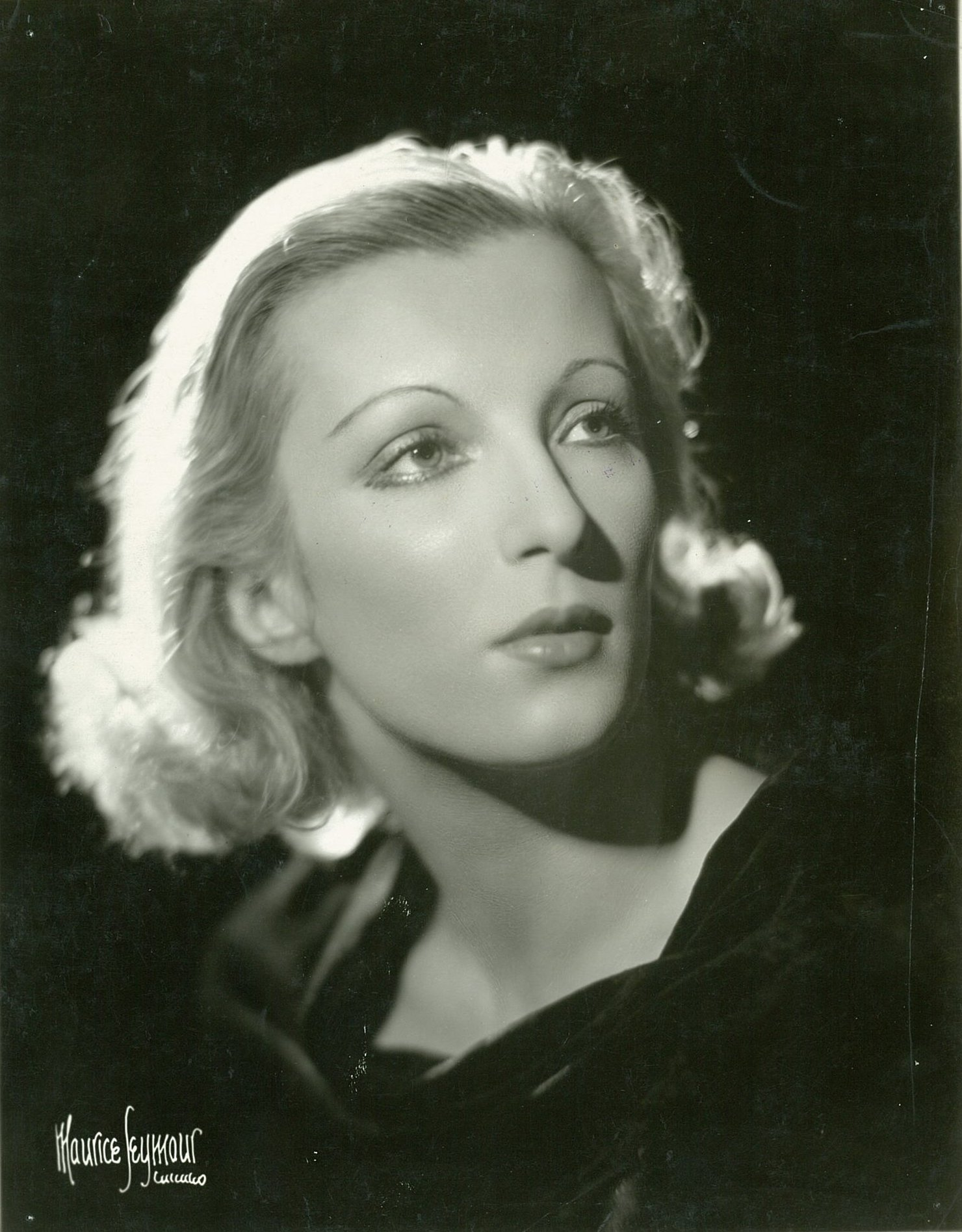
- Riabouchinska, c. 1938
- Born: 23 May 1917; Moscow, Russia
- Died: 24 August 2000 (aged 83); Los Angeles, California, U.S
- Occupations: Ballerina; ballet instructor
- Spouse: David Lichine (m. 1943; died 1972)
- Children: Tanica Lichine

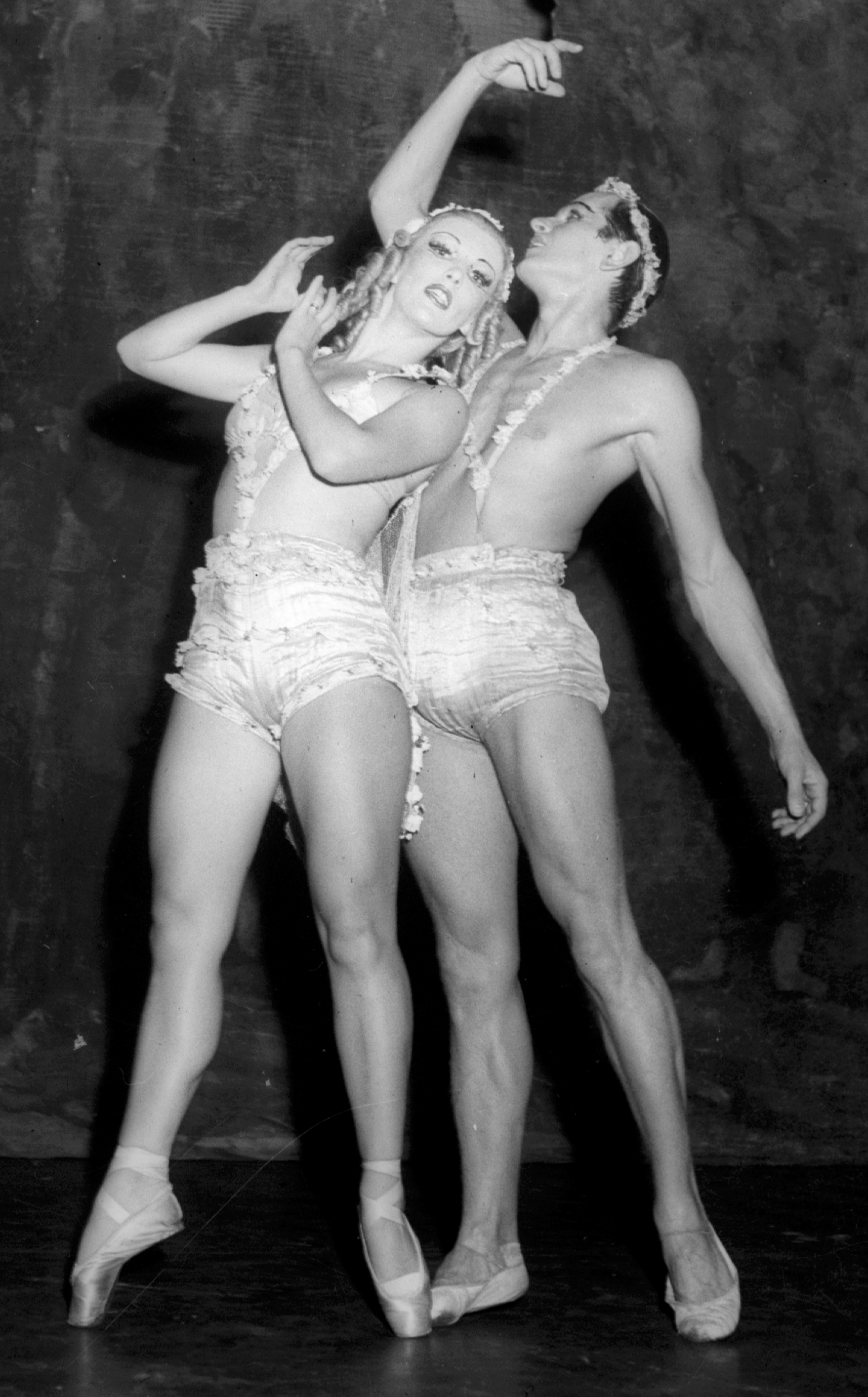
Tatiana Riabouchinska and Roman Jasinski in Les Dieux mendiants (The Gods go a-begging), photograph by Max Dupain, ca. 1939.

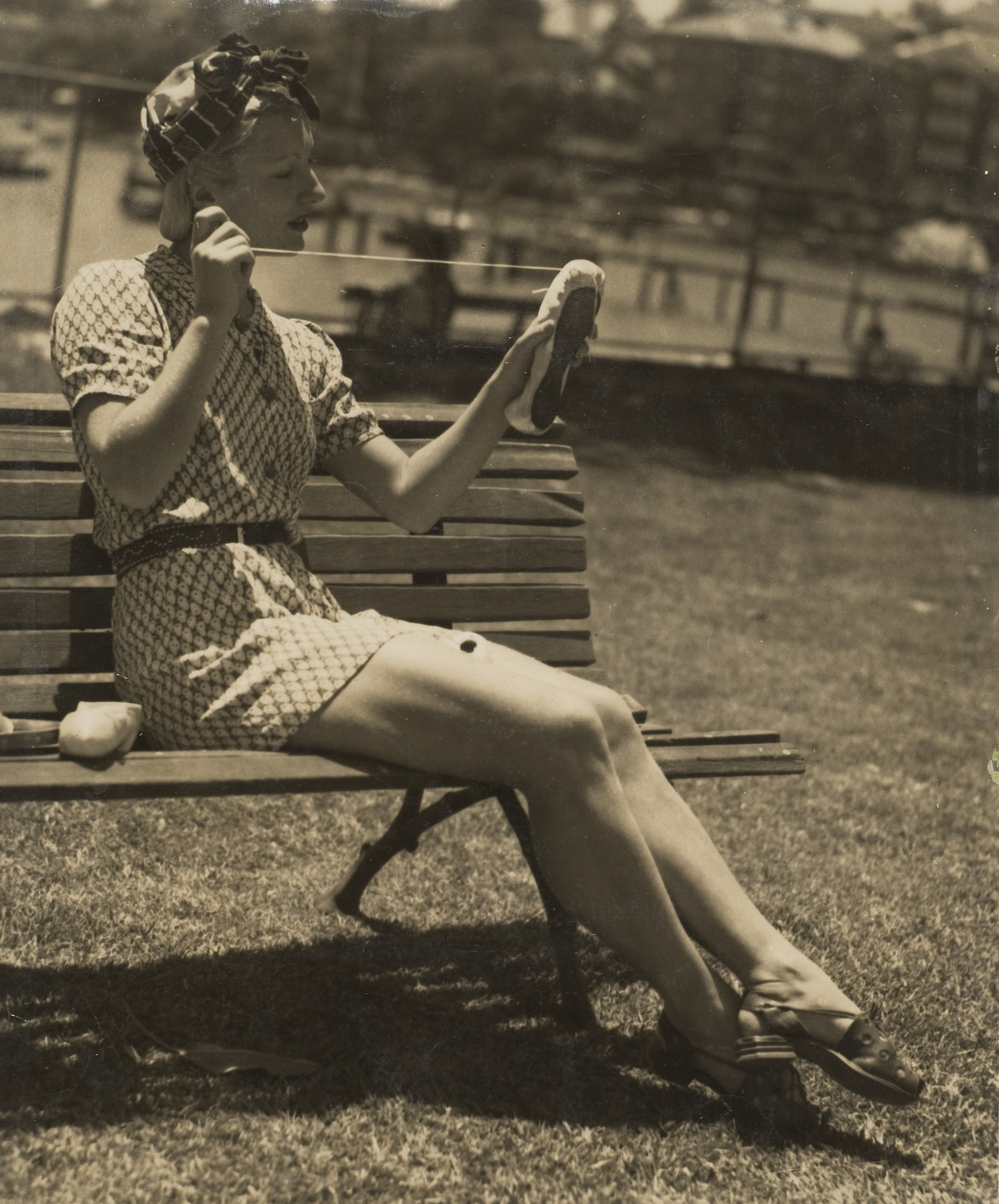
Tatiana Riabouchinska darns a ballet slipper, circa 1940.

Tatiana Mikhailovna Riabouchinska (Russian: Татья́на Миха́йловна Рябуши́нская, romanized: Tatyana Mikhaylovna Ryabushinskaya; 23 May 1917 – 24 August 2000) was a Russian-American prima ballerina and teacher. Famous at age 14 as one of the three "Baby Ballerinas" of the Ballet Russe de Monte Carlo in the 1930s, she matured into an artist whom critics called "the most unusual dancer of her generation."

== Early years ==
She was born in Moscow a few months before the October Revolution in 1917. Because her father was a banker to the Tsar Nicholas II, the whole family was put under house arrest by revolutionaries. But, with the help of their servants, her mother and the four children escaped and fled through the Caucasus, arriving eventually in the south of France. A few years after they had settled in Paris, where there was a large Russian émigré community, Tatiana, known as Tania, began her ballet studies with Alexandre Volinine, who had trained at the Bolshoi Ballet Academy in Moscow. She also studied with Mathilde Kschessinska, a friend of the family who had been prima ballerina assoluta of the Saint Petersburg Imperial Theaters. Under Volinine's tutelage, the girl developed strength, elevation, and speed; under Kschessinska, quick footwork and lyrical port de bras.

At 14, Riabouchinska was chosen by Nikita Balieff to join his Franco-Russian vaudeville troupe, Le Théâtre de la Chauve-Souris (The Bat Theater), often billed simply as La Chauve-Souris. In the 1931 edition of their revue, which featured Russian songs, dances, and comedy numbers, she appeared in two short ballets, Diana Hunts the Stag and The Romantic Adventures of an Italian Ballerina and a Marquis. In Paris, she was seen by choreographer and ballet master George Balanchine, who quickly signed her for the Ballet Russe de Monte Carlo, then being organized by Colonel Wassily de Basil and his associates. She joined that company after the American tour of La Chauve-Souris. She and two other young dancers in the company became known as the Baby Ballerinas.

== Career ==
In 1932, in her first season with the de Basil company, Riabouchinska created the role of the Child in Léonide Massine's Jeux d'Enfants and in two works by Balanchine, La Concurrence and Le Bourgeois Gentilhomme. Subsequently, she created roles in other Massine works, including the first three of his famous, and controversial, "symphonic" ballets: Frivolity in Les Présages (1933), set to Tchaikovsky's Fifth Symphony; the third and fourth movements of Choreartium (1933), set to Brahms's Fourth Symphony; and Reverie in Symphonie Fantastique (1936), by Berlioz.

After Michel Fokine joined the company, he created the roles of the Golden Cockerel in Le Coq d'Or (1937), the title role of Cendrillon (1938), and the Florentine Beauty in Paganini (1939) especially for her. Besides these roles, she danced in many other ballets in the company repertory. For Les Sylphides, perhaps Fokine's most famous work, she was coached by the choreographer himself. Her dancing of the Prelude, with exquisite pointework, soft little jumps, feathery landings, and liquid arm movements, became legendary, and she retained the role throughout her career.

Riabouchinska also created many roles in ballets choreographed by David Lichine, a principal dancer in the de Basil company, who made a second career as a choreographer. Besides leading roles in Nocturne (1933) and Les Imaginaires (1934), she embodied the Chief Spirit in Le Pavillon (1936), the Angelic Apparition in Francesca da Rimini (1937), the Flower Girl in Le Lion Amoureux (1937), and the Romantic Girl in Graduation Ball (1940), a joyous characterization that became another of her signature roles.

Riabouchinska remained with the de Basil company, which was finally renamed as the Original Ballet Russe, until 1942. The conflict of World War II disrupted its normal operations, and the company had to stop touring in Europe.

She married David Lichine in 1943, and the two of them embarked on a joint career as free agents, dancing and choreographing for many companies in the United States, England, France, and Argentina. They had one daughter, Tanica Lichine.

In the United States, Riabouchinska also appeared on Broadway in an unsuccessful operetta entitled Polonaise (1945), choreographed by Lichine to music of Frédéric Chopin. She appeared in a Hollywood film, Make Mine Music (1946), in which she and Lichine danced his choreography in the "Two Silhouettes" sequence. Throughout their years of dancing together, they were one of the ballet world's most admired and beloved couples.

== Later years ==
In 1953, the Lichines retired to Los Angeles, where they devoted their energies to their dance academy in Beverly Hills. They also founded and directed several small performing groups. After David Lichine died in 1972, Riabouchinska continued to teach for many years, counting a number of Hollywood celebrities among her students.

In the late 1990s, she was filmed teaching class in her studio and reminiscing about her years with the de Basil company. This footage, along with many archival film clips of her performances with the company, is included in the documentary film Ballets Russes (2005), a Goldfine/Geller production.

sources:https://studylib.net/doc/7464135/oklahoma-history-reader

== See also ==
- List of Russian ballet dancers

== Filmography ==
- Make Mine Music (1946) - Herself
