= Original Ballet Russe =

Former ballet company

General information
- Name: Original Ballet Russe
- Previous names: Les Ballets Russes de Monte-Carlo; Ballets Russes de Colonel W. de Basil; Covent Garden Russian Ballet
- Successor: Ballet Russe de Monte-Carlo
- Year founded: 1931
- Closed: 1947
- Founders: René Blum and Colonel Wassily de Basil
- Principal venue: Monte Carlo

Senior staff
- Company manager: Sol Hurok

Artistic staff
- Artistic director: Colonel Wassily de Basil
- Resident choreographers: Leonide Massine (1932–1937); George Balanchine (1932–1933); Michel Fokine (1937–c. 1941)

Other
- Formation: Principal; Soloist; Corps de Ballet

The Original Ballet Russe (originally named Ballets Russes de Monte-Carlo) was a ballet company established in 1931 by René Blum and Colonel Wassily de Basil as a successor to the Ballets Russes, founded in 1909 by Sergei Diaghilev. The company assumed the new name Original Ballet Russe after a split between de Basil and Blum. De Basil led the renamed company, while Blum and others founded a new company under the name Ballet Russe de Monte-Carlo. It was a large scale professional ballet company which toured extensively in Europe, Australia and New Zealand, the United States, and Central and South America. It closed down operations in 1947.

== History ==
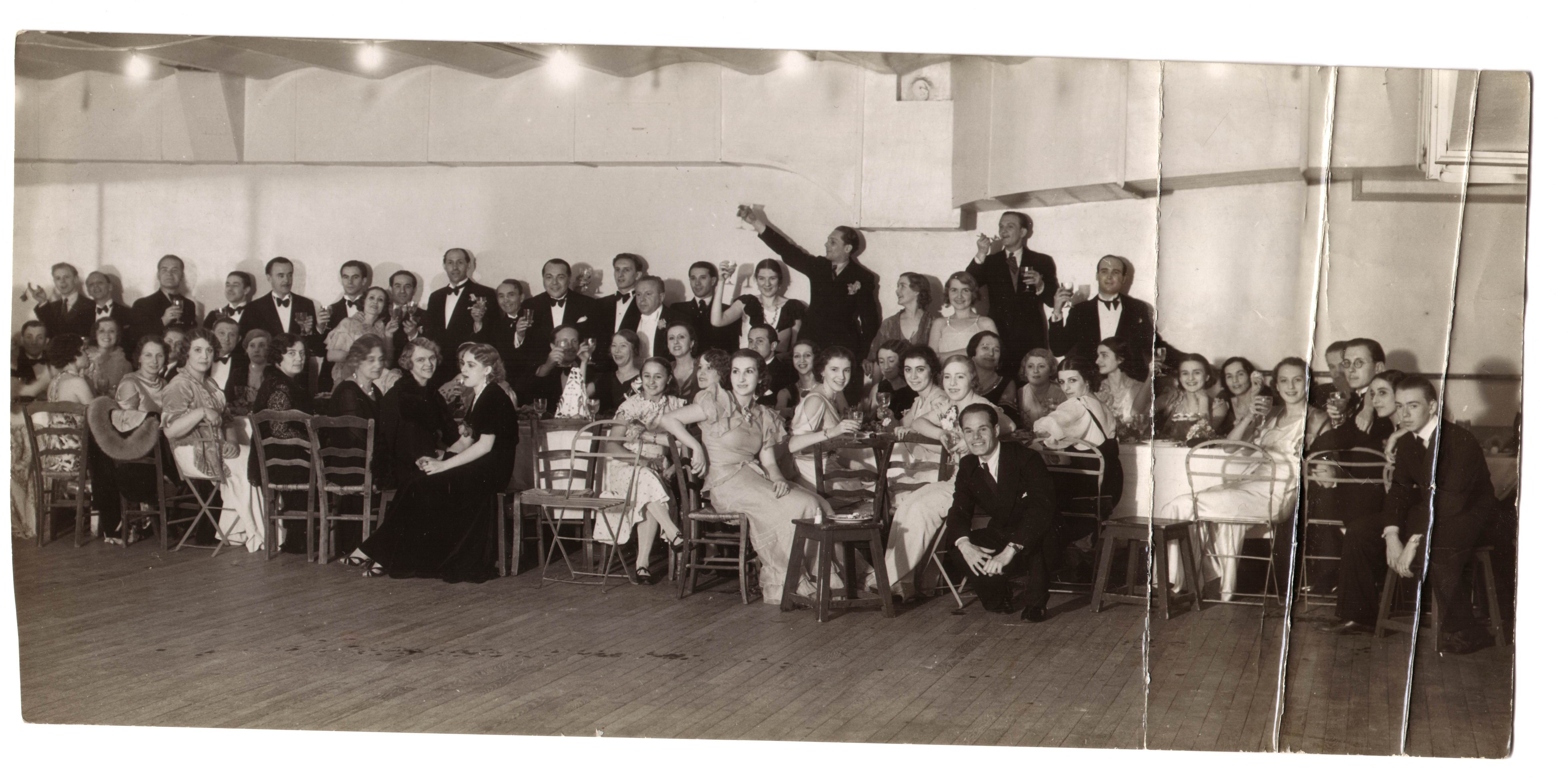
Bronislava Nijinska with the Ballets Russes in Monte Carlo, April 1934

=== Dissolution of Ballets Russes and formation of Ballets Russes de Monte-Carlo ===
The company's name is derived from the Ballets Russes of impresario Sergei Diaghilev. The last season of Diaghilev's Ballets Russes was 1929, during which it toured and performed in both London, England, and Paris, France. During the final season, it produced the new ballets The Prodigal Son and Le Bal. The company performed for the final time in London at the Covent Garden Theatre on July 26, 1929. Diaghliev died of complications from diabetes a month later, on August 19, 1929.

In 1931, with the help from financier Serge Denham, René Blum and Colonel Wassily de Basil formed Les Ballets Russes de Monte-Carlo. One of the new company's board members was American businessman Jim Thompson.

=== Massine and Balanchine join ===
The company hired Leonide Massine and George Balanchine as choreographers. The majority of the works performed had previously been staged by Diaghilev's company, but other new works were commissioned, such as Jeux d'enfants, with music by Georges Bizet and sets by Joan Miró. Featured dancers included David Lichine (who soon began choreographing ballets for the company), and the "baby ballerinas" Irina Baronova, Tamara Toumanova, and Tatiana Riabouchinska. The company conductor was Efrem Kurtz, who stayed until 1942, touring with them extensively, and the librettist was Boris Kochno. The company gave its first performance in Monte Carlo in 1932.

Without consulting Blum, Col. de Basil dropped Balanchine after one year – ostensibly because he thought that audiences preferred the works choreographed by Massine. Librettist Kochno was also let go, while dancer Toumanova left the company when Balanchine was fired. According to historian Katherine Sorley-Walker, however, Balanchine and Kochno left of their own volition, because they found Blum and De Basil "dictatorial."

=== Blum leaves, Nijinska joins ===
Col. de Basil and Blum had an acrimonious relationship, which ended in 1934 with Blum breaking up the partnership. Col. de Basil renamed his company Ballets Russes de Colonel W. de Basil. In April, 1934, Bronislava Nijinska directed the company's season at the Théâtre de Monte-Carlo, presenting her ballets Bolero, Variations, Etude, and Les Comediens Jaloux. Nijinska created Les Cent Baisers for the company's London season in 1935.

The company struggled financially in the wake of the Great Depression, and was on the verge of bankruptcy. Sol Hurok, an American, took over the management of the Ballet Russe and brought the company to the United States.

=== The company splits ===
In 1937, Massine left, joining with Blum to form their own company, recruiting several dancers from their previous group. However, the ballets which Massine had choreographed while under contract with Col. de Basil were owned by his company. Massine sued de Basil in London to regain the intellectual property rights to his own works. He also sued to claim the Ballet Russe de Monte-Carlo name. The jury decided that de Basil owned Massine's ballets created between 1932 and 1937, but not those created before 1932. It also ruled that both successor companies could use the name Ballet Russe – but only Massine and Blum's company could be called Ballet Russe de Monte-Carlo. Col. de Basil renamed his company again, calling it the Covent Garden Russian Ballet and bringing on Michel Fokine as resident choreographer.

Sol Hurok ended up managing Blum and Massine's company as well. The Ballet Russe de Monte-Carlo and the Original Ballet Russe often performed near each other. Under its new name, the company's first season, starting May 1938, was at the Royal Opera House, Covent Garden. Massine's Ballet Russe de Monte-Carlo had a season at the Theatre Royal, Drury Lane a few hundred yards away, and this season was known as the "London Ballet Wars".

After London, Hurok booked both of the companies to perform in New York (with de Basil's company playing the Hollywood Theatre), for a total of fifteen weeks, making it the longest ballet season of New York. Along with management, the two companies also shared dancers. Hurok continued to have the companies perform near each other; he hoped to reunite the companies, but ultimately was unsuccessful. The company then spent some weeks on a "whistle stop" tour of America, sleeping on the special train hired to transport them.

In 1939, the company spent a six-week season at Covent Garden. English ballerina Mona Inglesby danced with the company that season.

Finally, in 1939, Col. de Basil gave the company its final name, the Original Ballet Russe.

The company toured extensively throughout Europe and Australia, visiting Australia in 1936–37, 1938–39, and 1939–40. During his visit to Australia, de Basil commissioned work from Australians, especially from designers, who included Sidney Nolan and Kathleen and Florence Martin. He also instigated a design competition for an original Australian ballet, which was won by Donald Friend with designs for a ballet based on a fictitious event in the life of Ned Kelly. A number of dancers stayed in Australia, including Kira Bousloff, who went on to found the West Australian Ballet.

=== During World War II ===
Soon after they returned to the United States in 1939, World War II broke out. The company suffered financially, but was able to book an entire cast of dancers on tour to Havana, Cuba, in 1941. Alberto Alonso and his first wife Patricia Denise danced all the principal roles on the Havana tour. The company could not pay the dancers adequately, and some took second jobs in nightclubs to survive. Principal dancers were forced to take roles that were not solos.

While in Cuba, David Lichine and Tatiana Leskova appeared in Conga Pantera at the Cabaret Tropicana. Other dancers included Tamara Grigorieva, Nina Verchinina, Anna Leontieva, Genevieve Moulin, Tatiana Leskova, Anna Volkova, Your Lazowski, Dimitri Romanoff, Roman Jasinski, Paul Petroff, and Oleg Tupin.

=== Disbandment ===
In 1947, the Original Ballet Russe gave its last season in London before disbanding. The company was revived in 1951 by family members G. Kirsta and the Grigorievs, after Col. de Basil died. The company proved to be financially unstable, and folded while on tour in Europe in 1952.

== In popular culture ==
A feature documentary about the company, featuring interviews with many of the dancers, was released in 2005, with the title Ballets Russes.

A Thousand Encores: Ballets Russes in Australia was a documentary screened on ABC Television on November 3, 2009, about the company's three visits to Australia between 1936 and 1940. The documentary claims that there is more footage of the Ballets Russes in Australia than anywhere else in the world. Some film was in colour, a rarity for that time.

== Works ==
- 1932
  - George Balanchine's Cotillion, Le Bourgeois Gentilhomme, La Concurrence, and Suites de Danses
  - Léonide Massine's Jeux d'enfants
  - Boris Romanoff's Chout (Le Bouffon) Pulcinella, and L'Amour Sorcier
  - Lev Ivanov's Le Lac des Cygnes (Swan Lake), act II
  - Michel Fokine's Petrouchka, Les Sylphides, and The Polovtsian Dances from Prince Igor
- 1933
  - David Lichine's Nocturne (set to the music of Rameau)
  - Léonide Massine's Les Présages (set to Tchaikovsky's Symphony No. 5), Le Beau Danube, Beach, Scuola di Ballo, and Les Matelots
  - 14 September — Michel Fokine's Carnaval (set to Robert Schumann's Carnaval, Op. 9), London, UK
  - 24 October premiere — Leonide Massine's Choreartium (set to Brahm's Fourth Symphony), Alhambra Theatre, London, UK
  - Vaslav Nijinsky's L'Après-midi d'un faune
- 1934
  - Léonide Massine's Le Tricorne, Chicago
  - Léonide Massine's Union Pacific, Philadelphia
  - Léonide Massine's La Boutique Fantasque
  - Léonide Massine's Les Contes Russes
  - David Lichine's Les Imaginaires
  - Bronislava Nijinska's Bolero
  - Bronislava Nijinska's Variations
  - Bronislava Nijinska's Étude
  - Bronislava Nijinska's Les Comediens Jaloux
  - Marius Petipa's Le Mariage d'Aurore (arranged by Nijinska)
  - Michel Fokine's L'Oiseau de feu
- 1935
  - Léonide Massine's Jardin public, Chicago
  - Léonide Massine's Le Bal, Chicago
  - Léonide Massine's Union Pacific
  - Léonide Massine's Les femmes de bonne humeur
  - Léonide Massine's Le Soleil de Nuit
  - Bronislava Nijinska's Les Cent Baisers
  - Michel Fokine's Schéhérazade, Thamar, and Le Spectre de la Rose
- 1936
  - David Lichine's Le Pavillon, 24 July premiere
  - Léonide Massine's Symphonie Fantastique (set to Hector Berlioz' symphony), Covent Garden, London, UK, 13 October
  - Léonide Massine's La Boutique fantasque, Theatre Royal, Adelaide, Australia
  - Leon Woizikovsky's L'Amour Sorcier
  - Léonide Massine's Cimarosiana
  - Michel Fokine's Cléopâtre and Papillons
  - Bronislava Nijinska's Danses slaves et tziganes and Les Noces

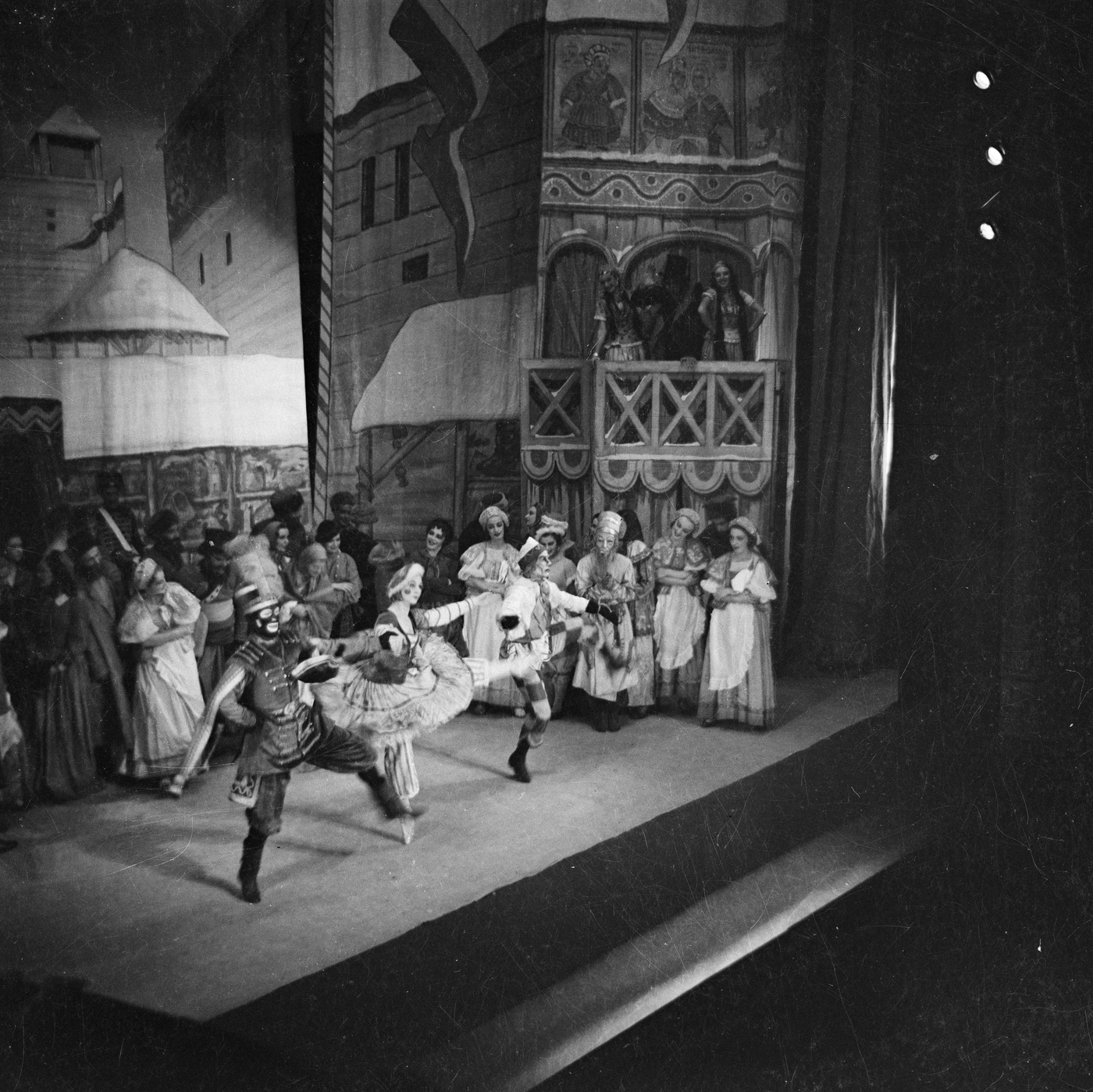
Helene Kirsova stars in Petrouchka, Theatre Royal, Sydney, 11 January 1937. Photo from the Sam Hood collection.

- 1936–1937 Australia tour
  - Marius Petipa's Aurora's Wedding
  - Léonide Massine's Le Beau Danube
  - Léonide Massine's La Boutique Fantasque
  - Michel Fokine's Carnaval
  - Léonide Massine's Les Contes Russes
  - George Balanchine's Cotillon
  - Michel Fokine's L'Oiseau de Feu
  - Bronislava Nijinska's Les Cent Baisers
  - Leon Woitzikowsky's L'Amour Sorcier
  - Vaslav Nijinsky's L'Après-midi d'un faune
  - Léonide Massine's Le Soleil de Nuit
  - Michel Fokine's Petrouchka
  - Leon Woitzikowsky's Port Said
  - Léonide Massine's Les Presages
  - Michel Fokine's Prince Igor
  - Michel Fokine's Schéhérazade
  - Léonide Massine's Scuola di Ballo
  - Michel Fokine's Le Spectre de la Rose
  - Lev Ivanov's Swan Lake, Act II
  - Michel Fokine's Les Sylphides
  - Michel Fokine's Thamar
- 1937
  - 11 January — Michel Fokine's Petrouchka, Sydney
  - Michel Fokine's Le Coq d'or (set to the music of Nikolai Rimsky-Korsakov)
  - David Lichine's Francesca da Rimini, Le Lion amoureux, and Les Dieux mendiants
- 1938
  - Michel Fokine's Cendrillon
  - David Lichine's Le Fils Prodigue and Protée
- 1939
  - Michel Fokine's Paganini
- 1940
  - Serge Lifar's Le Danube bleu
- 1940 Australia tour
  - David Lichine's Graduation Ball (set to the music of Johann Strauss II), Melbourne
  - Igor Schwezoff's La Lutte eternelle, Sydney
  - Mikhail Obukhov (after Petipa, Saint-Leon)'s Coppélia, Sydney
  - Nina Verchinina's Etude (The Quest)
  - Serge Lifar's Icare and Pavane (Las Meninas)
- 1941 Havana tour
  - Michael Fokine's Les Sylphides, Le Coq d'or, Paganini, Prince Igor, Carnaval, Petrushka, Sheherazade, and Le Spectre de la Rose
  - Léonide Massine's Symphonie Fantastique, Les Présages, and Le Beau Danube
  - Marius Petipa's Le Mariage d’Aurore
  - George Balanchine's Cotillon and Balustrade
  - Bronislava Nijinska's Les Cent Baisers
- 1942
  - Vania Psota and S. Pueyrredón de Elizalde's Fue una vez
- 1943
  - Vania Psota's El Malón
- 1944
  - Vania Psota's La isla de los ceibos
- 1945
  - Vania Psota's Yx-kik
- 1946
  - spring — David Lichine's Cain and Abel, Mexico City
  - John Taras' Camille
  - William Dollar's Constantia
  - Anton Dolin's Giselle (after Coralli) and Pas de Quatre
  - Antonia Cobos' Mute Wife
  - Edward Caton's Sebastian
  - Vania Psota's Yara
- 1947
  - Jerome Robbins' Pas de Trois
  - Bronislava Nijinska's Pictures at an Exhibition
  - spring — Giselle, Metropolitan Opera House, New York
  - spring — Swan Lake, Metropolitan Opera House, New York
  - Boris Kniasev's Piccoli and The Silver Birch
  - summer — David Lichine's Graduation Ball, London, UK
- 1948
  - Anatole Joukovsky's Danzas eslavas
  - Nina Verchinina's Suite choréographique
  - Nina Verchinina's Valse triste
