= Arnold Haskell =

British dance critic (1903–1980)

- Haskell in 1936
- Born: July 19, 1903; London
- Died: November 14, 1980 (aged 77)
- Occupation: Dance critic

Arnold Lionel David Haskell CBE (19 July 1903, London – 14 November 1980, Bath) was a British dance critic who founded the Camargo Society in 1930. With Ninette de Valois, he was influential in the development of the Royal Ballet School, later becoming the school's headmaster.

== Biography ==
Haskell was the son of Emmy Mesritz and banker Jacob Silas Haskell, an Iraqi Jew from Baghdad who left for India at age 13 and later moved to Hong Kong before finally settling in London. He was one of the founders of the Eastern Bank, which had branches in Gulf countries and cities.

Arnold Haskell grew up at Queen's Gate, South Kensington, London, and was educated at Westminster School and Trinity Hall, Cambridge (where he read law and was a friend of fellow Old Westminsters Angus MacPhail and Ivor Montagu). Haskell became fascinated by ballet when his mother prevailed on him to come with her to see the thirteen-year-old Alicia Markova at Seraphine Astafieva's studio in Chelsea.

Haskell first went to Australia in 1936 with the visiting Monte Carlo Russian Ballet as a publicist/reporter, writing articles and reviews for several Australian newspapers and journals, such as The Home, and sent reports home to England for magazines such as the Dancing Times. His book Dancing Round The World, published in London in 1937, is an account of his adventures on that tour.

He returned to Australia in 1938 to gather material for Waltzing Matilda: a background to Australia published in 1943. On this second visit, he continued writing articles and reviews for Australian newspapers and magazines, this time for the second Ballets Russes company to tour Australia, the Covent Garden Russian Ballet.

In 1974, Haskell was awarded an Honorary Degree (Doctor of Letters) by the University of Bath. His son, Francis Haskell, was Professor of Art History at Oxford 1967–1995.

== Publications ==
- Sir Jacob Epstein, The Sculptor speaks: Jacob Epstein to Arnold L.Haskell. A series of conversations on art (London: Heinemann, 1931)
- A contributor to The Daily Telegraph (1934–1947)
- Balletomania: the story of an obsession (London: V. Gollancz, 1934).
- Diaghileff: his artistic and private life (London: Victor Gollancz, 1936).] Cheap edition. Written in collaboration with Walter Nouvel.
- Felicity dances; a children's tale about the ballet (London, New York (etc.): T. Nelson and Sons, Ltd. (1937))
- Dancing round the world: memoirs of an attempted escape from ballet (London: V. Gollancz, 1937).] Drawings by Daryl Lindsay. Published in New York by Dodge Publishing Co. in 1938
- Ballet; a complete guide to appreciation, history, aesthetics, ballets, dancers (Harmondsworth, Middlesex, Eng.: Penguin Books, 1938)
- Waltzing Matilda: a background to Australia (London: Adam and Charles Black, 1940)
- Ballet to Poland (London: Adam and Charles Black, 1940)
- Australia (London: Collins for Penns in the Rocks Press, 1941). From the series The British Commonwealth in pictures.
- The Australians: the Anglo-Saxondom of the southern hemisphere: an historical sketch (London: A.& C. Black, 1943)
- The national ballet: a history and a manifesto (London: A. & C., Black, 1944). 'With an overture by Ninette de Valois'.
- Miracle in the Gorbals: a study (Edinburgh: The Albyn Press, 1946). A discussion of Robert Helpmann's choreography, Michael Benthall's scenario, and Arthur Bliss' music for the ballet of the same name.
- The making of a dancer, and other papers on the background of ballet (London, A. & C. Black, 1946)
- Ballet since 1939 (London, New York etc.: Pub. for the British council by Longmans Green & co (1946)). Bibliography of books on British ballet published since 1939.
- Prelude to ballet: an analysis and a guide to appreciation (London : Thomas Nelson & Sons, 1947). New and revised edition.
- Ballet, a reader's guide ((London): Cambridge Univ. Press, 1947).]
- Ballet vignettes (Edinburgh: Albyn Press, 1948)
- Going to the ballet (London: Phoenix House, 1950)
- Ballet, 1945–1950 (London, New York: Published for the British Council by Longmans, Green (1951))
- A picture history of ballet (London: Hulton Press, 1954)
- Arnold Haskell, Mark Bonham Carter, Michael Wood (eds.) Gala performance (London: Collins, 1955). With a foreword by H.R.H. the Princess Margaret.
- Ballet retrospect (London: B. T. Batsford (1964))
- Heroes and roses: a view of Bulgaria (London: Darton, Longman & Todd, 1966)
- Ballet russe: the age of Diaghilev (London: Weidenfeld & Nicolson, 1968)
- The wonderful world of dance (Garden City, NY: Doubleday (1969))
- Infantilia: the archaeology of the nursery (London: Dobson, 1971)
- Balletomane at large: an autobiography (London: Heinemann, 1972)
- Ballet panorama - an illustrated chronicle of three centuries (London: B T Batsford, 1938)

== See also ==
- Cronshaw, Jonathan, 'Carving a Legacy: The Identity of Jacob Epstein', PhD Thesis, University of Leeds, 2010.
- Potter, Michelle, 'Arnold Haskell in Australia: did politics or connoisseurship determine his role?', Dance Research (Edinburgh), 24:1 (Summer 2006), pp. 37–53.
- Daryl Lindsay
- Sylvia (ballet)
