= René Blum (impresario) =

French theatre impresario (1878–1942)

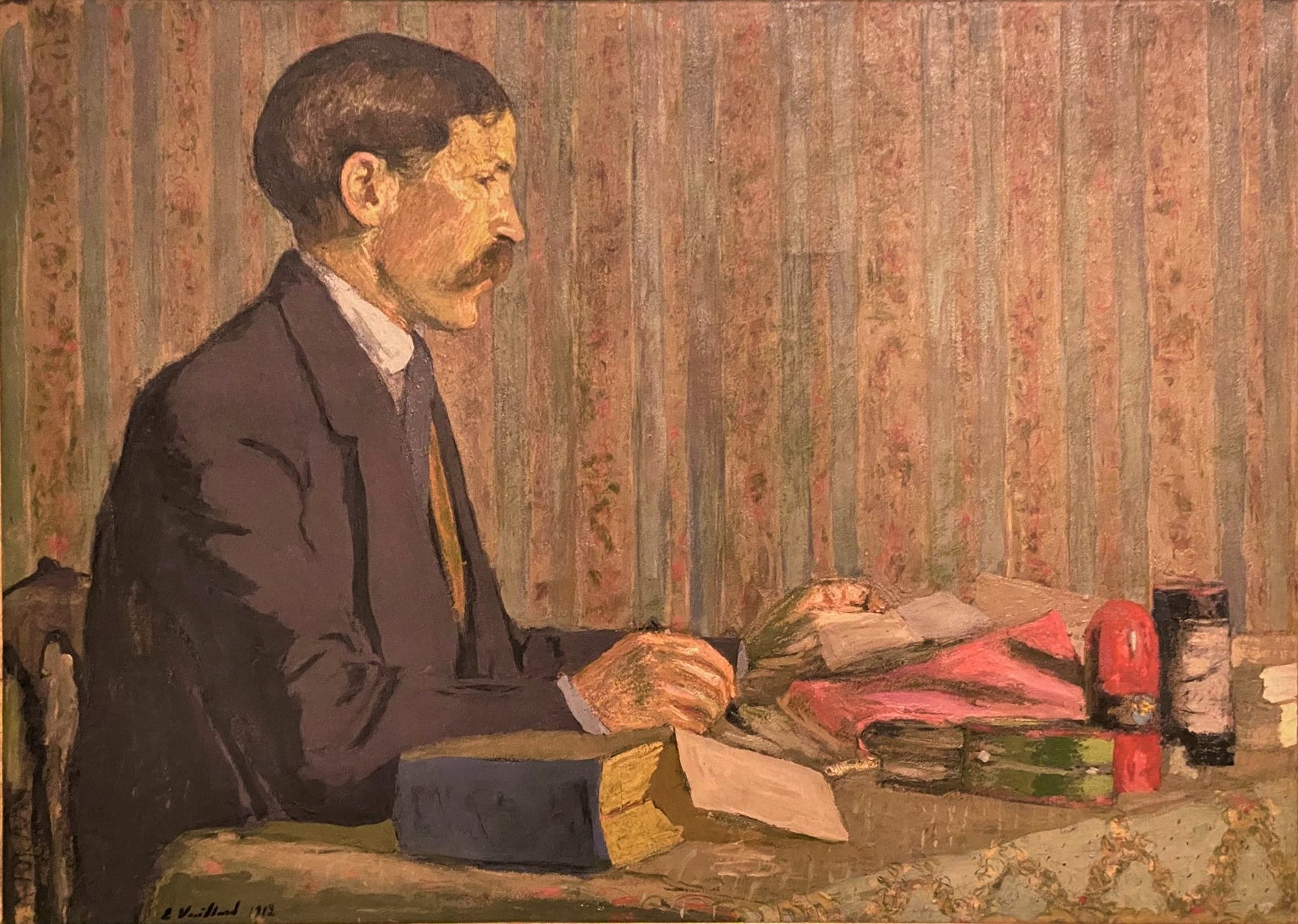
- 1912 portrait of Blum by Édouard Vuillard
- Born: René Blum; 13 March 1878; Paris, France
- Died: September 1942 (aged 64); Auschwitz-Birkenau, German-occupied Poland
- Occupations: Opera and ballet impresario
- Known for: Founder of the Ballet de l'Opéra at Monte Carlo
- Relatives: Léon Blum (brother)
- Awards: Croix de Guerre

René Blum (13 March 1878 – September 1942) was a French Jewish theatrical impresario. He was the founder of the Ballet de l'Opéra at Monte Carlo and was the younger brother of the Socialist Prime Minister of France, Léon Blum. A Jew, he was interned in various camps from 1941 until his death at the Auschwitz concentration camp in late September 1942. While imprisoned in the camps, he was known for keeping up the spirits of his fellow prisoners with tales of his life in the arts.

== Biography ==
Blum was born in Paris.

At the turn of the 20th century, he was an editor at the Parisian literary journal Gil Blas and a popular theatre critic. Blum contributed to the catalogue of the 1912 Salon de la Section d'Or, an early Cubist exhibition in Paris. He became a friend of Marcel Proust, and it was on his advice that Proust turned to Bernard Grasset to publish Du côté de chez Swann.

During World War I, Blum served in the Battle of the Somme. He saved threatened artwork from Amiens Cathedral and earned the French Croix de Guerre.

=== Founder of Ballet of Monte-Carlo ===
He became director of plays and operettas at Monte Carlo in 1924, where Sergei Diaghilev's Ballets Russes was based. In 1931, Blum was hired by Louis II, Prince of Monaco, to create a ballet company that would continue the work and legacy of the late Diaghilev (who had died in 1929). In 1932, with the help of financier Serge Denham, Blum and Colonel W. de Basil formed the Ballets Russes de Monte-Carlo.

Blum and de Basil fell out in 1934, and their Ballets Russes partnership dissolved. Blum kept ballet alive in Monte Carlo. In short order, he hired choreographer Bronislava Nijinska. After Nijinska left, Blum hired Michel Fokine. In 1937, Blum and former Ballets Russes choreographer Léonide Massine acquired financing from Fleischmann's Yeast heir Julius Fleischmann, Jr.'s World Art, Inc. to create a new ballet company. In 1938, their new company was allowed to regain the name Ballet Russe de Monte-Carlo (although the company fled for the United States in 1939, and was thereafter mostly based in New York City).

=== Deportation and death ===
In the summer of 1940, after the German occupation of Paris, Blum returned to France to be with his family. He was arrested on 12 December 1941 in his Parisian home, among the first Jews to be arrested in Paris by the French police. He was held in the Beaune-la-Rolande internment camp, then in the Drancy internment camp. On 23 September 1942 he was shipped to the Auschwitz concentration camp. He was murdered by the Nazis at age 64 in late September 1942.
