= Wassily de Basil =

Russian ballet impresario (1888–1951)

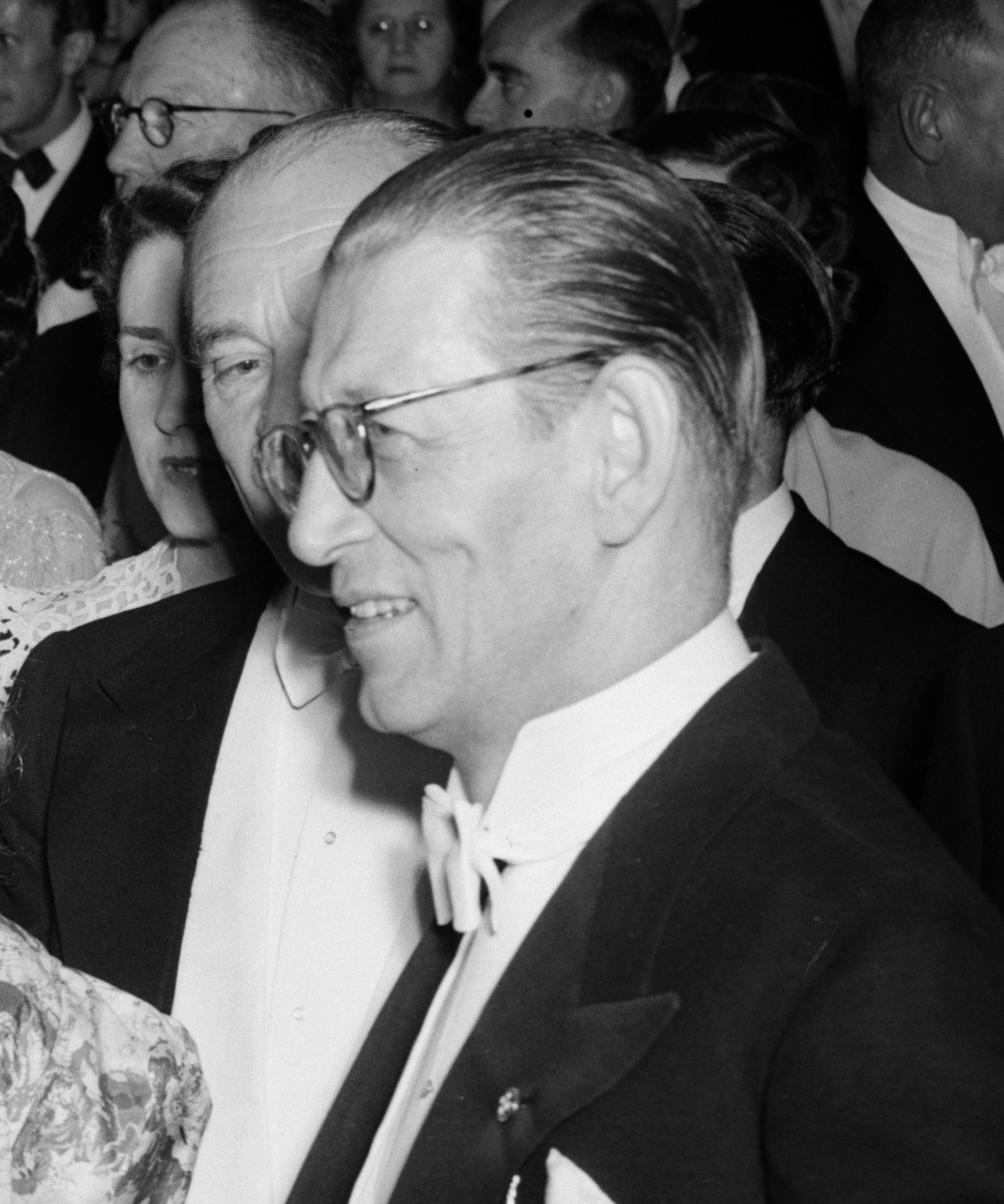
- Voskresensky in 1940
- Born: Vassily Grigorievich Voskresensky; 16 September [O.S. 4 September] 1888; Kovno, Russian Empire
- Died: 27 July 1951 (aged 62); Nice, France
- Other name: Colonel W. de Basil
- Occupation: Ballet impresario
- Known for: Co-founder of the Ballet Russe de Monte Carlo

Vasily Grigoryevich Voskresensky (Russian: Василий Григорьевич Воскресенский; 16 September [O.S. 4 September] 1888 – 27 July 1951), commonly known as Colonel Wassily de Basil, was a Russian ballet impresario.

== Biography ==
Vasily Grigoryevich Voskresensky was born in Kovno in the Russian Empire (present-day Lithuania), in 1888 (his year of birth is given alternately as 1880 or 1886). He retired from the Imperial Russian Army as a colonel in the Cossack army, fighting during the First World War in Baku against the Turkish and German forces. He was awarded the Order of St. George by his general, Lazar Bicherakhov, himself referred to as the "last soldier of the Empire" by writer Vlad Olgin.

Voskresensky was demobilised from the army in 1919 and worked as a truck driver in Paris before launching himself as a ballet impresario with his first small ballet touring company in 1921. Hiving off the success of Sergei Diaghilev, by 1923 Voskresensky was doing well enough to hire Olga Smimova and Nikolay Tripolitov as his principal dancers on small tours in France, Germany, Switzerland and Austria.

It was at this point he adopted his stage name Wassily de Basil (essentially Basil de Basil) in 1923 and gave the name of his troupe as Ballet Russe directed by W. de Basil.

Following the death of Diaghilev in 1929, the members of his Ballets Russes went in many directions. Around 1925, Voskresensky partnered with Alexey Tsereteli (also Zereteli) and Ignaty Zon to form the artists agency called Zerbason. In 1929–1930, Voskresensky's ballet troupe acted together with Tsereteli's opera troupe. Voskresensky, Tseretelli and Michel Kachouk, the manager of Feodor Chaliapin, became directors of the Opéra Russe à Paris, a company originally formed by soprano Maria Kousnetsova (also known as Maria Kuznetsova).

Voskresensky and René Blum, the ballet director at the Monte Carlo Opera, along with financier Serge Denham, founded the Ballets Russes de Monte-Carlo in 1931. The ballet gave its first performance in Monte Carlo on January 11, 1932 – the national holiday of Monte Carlo.

Blum and Voskresensky did not agree artistically, leading to a 1934 split, after which Voskresensky formed an arrangement with financier Sol Hurok. Voskresensky initially renamed the company Ballets Russes de Colonel W. de Basil.

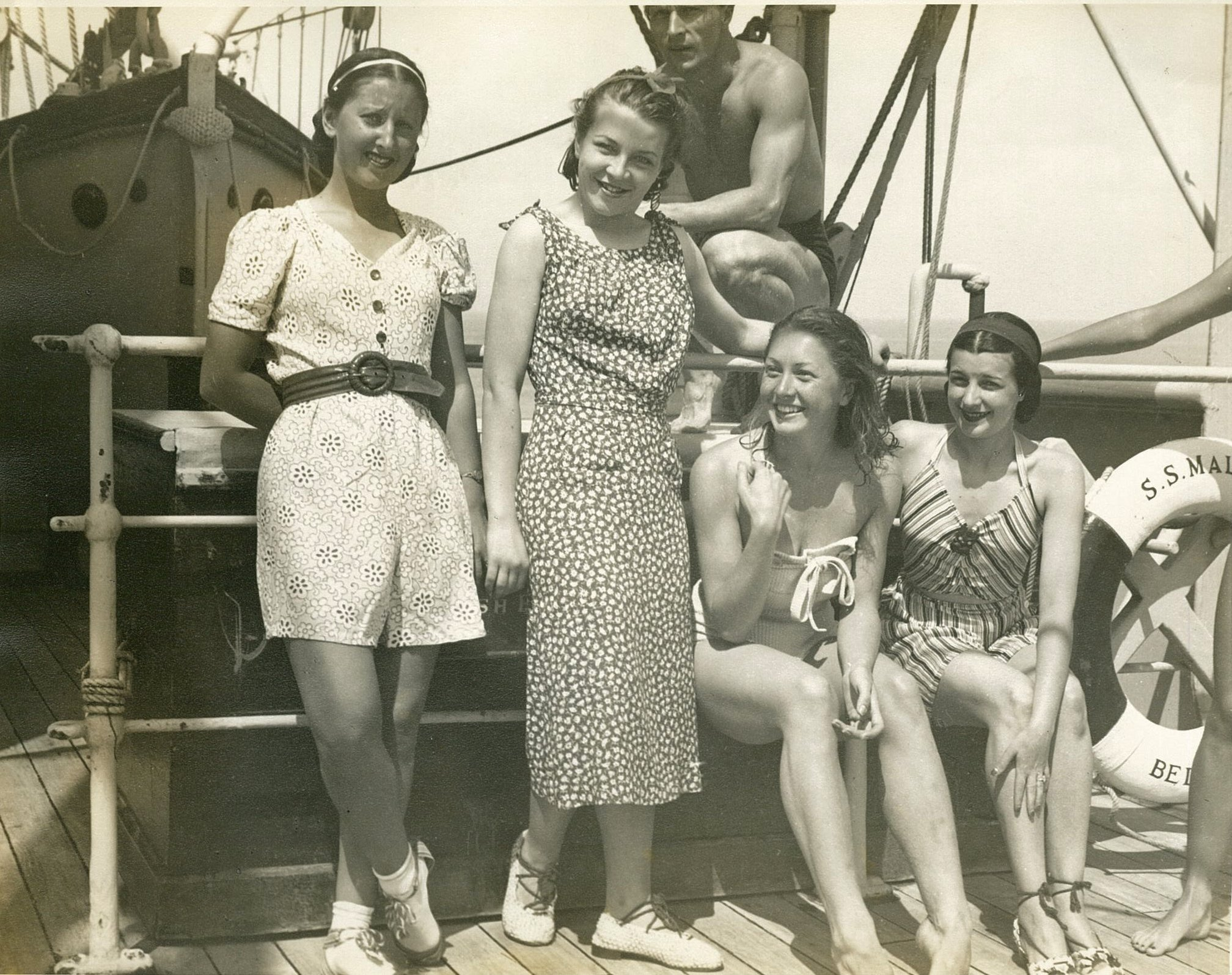
Members of the group aboard RMS Maloja, 1 September 1938.

In 1937, René Blum and former Ballets Russes choreographer Léonide Massine organized a new ballet company, and lured away some of Voskresensky's dancers. In addition, Massine sued de Basil in London to regain the intellectual property rights to his own works. He also sued to claim the Ballet Russe de Monte Carlo name. The jury decided that Voskresensky owned Massine's ballets created between 1932 and 1937, but not those created before 1932. It also ruled that both successor companies could use the name Ballet Russe — but only Massine & Blum's company could be called Ballet Russe de Monte-Carlo. Voskresensky renamed his company again, as the Covent Garden Russian Ballet. In 1939, he gave the company its final name, the Original Ballet Russe.

Voskresensky brought the Original Ballet Russe on a tour of Australia in 1939–1940, travelling there aboard the P&O ocean liner RMS Maloja in September 1938. He had earlier organised tours to Australia in 1936–1937 and 1938–1939, although he did not travel with the company. During his visit to Australia, Voskresensky commissioned work from Australians, especially from designers, who included Sidney Nolan and Kathleen and Florence Martin. He also instigated a design competition for an original Australian ballet, which was won by Donald Friend with designs for a ballet based on a fictitious event in the life of Ned Kelly.

He directed his Ballet Russe companies, which performed under a variety of different names, until his death in Nice in 1951. All in all, Voskresensky's troupes presented 40 world premieres, and maintained 100 ballets. They gave performances in 600 cities located in 70 countries around the world. His acquisition of Sergei Diaghilev's costumes and sets in 1934 when Massine could not come up with the money, helped Voskresensky's company assume the mantle of leadership in the modern ballet world.

On 27 July 1951, Voskresensky died from a heart attack in his home in Paris.

After his death, he joined many of his ballet dancers and comrades in the Sainte-Geneviève-des-Bois Russian Cemetery, Paris.
