= List of 1990s ballet premieres =

This is a list of ballet premieres in the 1990s, by year.

== 1990 ==
| title | choreographer | composer | company | venue | date |
|---|---|---|---|---|---|
| Twinkliana | Sean Lavery | Wolfgang Amadeus Mozart | Barnard College Dance Department | Columbia University | 11 October |

== 1991 ==
| title | choreographer | composer | company |
|---|---|---|---|
| Ash | Peter Martins | Michael Torke | New York City Ballet |
| Caroline Mathilde | Flemming Flindt | Peter Maxwell Davies | Royal Danish Ballet |
| Dance Preludes | Miriam Mahdaviani | Witold Lutosławski | New York City Ballet |
| Pirates of Penzance - The Ballet! | Daryl Gray | Arthur Sullivan | Queensland Ballet |
| Romeo and Juliet | Sean Lavery | Sergei Prokofiev | New York City Ballet |
| Winter Dreams | Kenneth MacMillan | Pyotr Ilyich Tchaikovsky | The Royal Ballet |

== 1992 ==
| title | choreographer | composer(s) | company |
|---|---|---|---|
| Delight of the Muses | Peter Martins | Charles Wuorinen | New York City Ballet |
| Images | Miriam Mahdaviani | Claude Debussy | New York City Ballet Diamond Project |
| Three Preludes | Mark Morris | George Gershwin | New York City Ballet |
| Zakouski | Peter Martins | Rachmaninoff, Stravinsky, Prokofiev and Tschaikovsky | New York City Ballet |
| Jeu de cartes | Peter Martins | Igor Stravinsky | New York City Ballet |
| The Judas Tree | Kenneth MacMillan | Brian Elias | Royal Ballet |

== 1993 ==
| title | choreographer | composer | company | venue | date |
|---|---|---|---|---|---|
| Billboards | Laura Dean, Charles Moulton, Margo Sappington, Peter Pucci | Prince | Joffrey Ballet | Hancher Auditorium, U. Iowa | Wednesday, January 27 |
| Zenobia | George Balanchine | Richard Rodgers | New York City Ballet | New York State Theater | Tuesday, November 23 |

== 1994 ==
| title | choreographer | composer | company |
|---|---|---|---|
| 2 and 3 Part Inventions | Jerome Robbins | Johann Sebastian Bach | School of American Ballet |
| A Suite of Dances | Jerome Robbins | Johann Sebastian Bach | White Oak Dance Project |
| Correlazione | Miriam Mahdaviani | Arcangelo Corelli | NYCB Diamond Project |
| X-Ray | Peter Martins | John Adams | New York City Ballet |

== 1995 ==
| title | choreographer | composer | company |
|---|---|---|---|
| Adams Violin Concerto | Peter Martins | John Adams | New York City Ballet |
| Edward II | David Bintley | John McCabe | Stuttgart Ballet |
| Swan Lake | Matthew Bourne | Pyotr Ilyich Tchaikovsky | Sadler's Wells |
| West Side Story Suite | Jerome Robbins | Leonard Bernstein | New York City Ballet |

== 1996 ==
| title | choreographer | composer | company | venue | date |
|---|---|---|---|---|---|
| Touch | David Parsons | Richard Peaslee | New York City Ballet | New York State Theater | February 15 |
| The Vertiginous Thrill of Exactitude | William Forsythe | Franz Schubert | Frankfurt Ballet | Städtische Bühnen Frankfurt | January 20 |

== 1997 ==
| title | choreographer | composer | company | venue | date | notes |
|---|---|---|---|---|---|---|
| Brandenburg | Jerome Robbins | JS Bach | New York City Ballet | New York State Theater | January 22 | |
| Othello | Lar Lubovitch | Elliot Goldenthal | San Francisco Ballet | Metropolitan Opera House | May 23 | |

== 1998 ==
| title | choreographer | composer | company | venue or presentation | date | notes |
|---|---|---|---|---|---|---|
| Middle Duo | Alexei Ratmansky | Yury Khanon | | Maryinsky Theater | November 24 | |
| River of Light | Peter Martins | Charles Wuorinen | New York City Ballet | New York State Theater | June 11 | |
| Robin Hood | Paul Vasterling | Erich Wolfgang Korngold | Nashville Ballet | TPAC’s Polk Theater | | |

== 1999 ==
| title | choreographer | composer | company | venue or presentation | date | notes |
|---|---|---|---|---|---|---|
| Sandpaper Ballet | Mark Morris | Leroy Anderson | San Francisco Ballet | War Memorial Opera House | April 27 | |
| Scènes de Ballet | Christopher Wheeldon | Igor Stravinsky | New York City Ballet | New York State Theater | May 19 | |
