= List of 1980s ballet premieres =

This is a list of ballet premieres in the 1980s, by year.

== 1980 ==
title	choreographer	composer	company	venue	date
Suite of Dances	Jerome Robbins	Leonard Bernstein	New York City Ballet	New York State Theater	January 17
Gloria	Kenneth MacMillan	Francis Poulenc	Royal Ballet	Royal Opera House	March 13
Walpurgisnacht	George Balanchine	Charles Gounod		New York State Theater	May 15
The Seagull	Maya Plisetskaya	Rodion Shchedrin	Bolshoi Ballet	Bolshoi Theatre	May 27
Robert Schumann's Davidsbündlertänze	George Balanchine	Robert Schumann	New York City Ballet	New York State Theater	June 19
Rhapsody	Frederick Ashton	Sergei Rachmaninoff	The Royal Ballet	Royal Opera House	August 4

== 1981 ==
title	choreographer	composer	company
Andantino	Jerome Robbins	Pyotr Ilyich Tschaikovsky	New York City Ballet Tschaikovsky Festival
Mozartiana	George Balanchine	Pyotr Ilyich Tschaikovsky	New York City Ballet Tschaikovsky Festival
Piano Pieces	Jerome Robbins	Pyotr Ilyich Tschaikovsky	New York City Ballet Tschaikovsky Festival
Symphony No. 1	Peter Martins	Pyotr Ilyich Tschaikovsky	New York City Ballet Tschaikovsky Festival
Isadora	Kenneth MacMillan	Richard Rodney Bennett	The Royal Ballet

== 1982 ==
title	choreographer	composer	company	venue	date
Great Galloping Gottschalk	Lynne Taylor-Corbett	Louis Moreau Gottschalk	American Ballet Theatre	Miami Beach Theatre	January 12
Gershwin Piano Concerto	Jerome Robbins	George Gershwin	New York City Ballet	New York State Theater	February 6
Pas de légumes	Frederick Ashton	Gioachino Rossini	Sadler's Wells Royal Ballet	Sadler's Wells Theatre	May 20
Piano-Rag-Music	Peter Martins	Igor Stravinsky	New York City Ballet	New York State Theater	June 10
Tango	George Balanchine	Igor Stravinsky	New York City Ballet	New York State Theater	June 10
Noah and the Flood	George Balanchine	Igor Stravinsky	New York City Ballet	New York State Theater	June 11
Élégie	George Balanchine	Igor Stravinsky	New York City Ballet	New York State Theater	June 13
Variations for Orchestra	George Balanchine	Igor Stravinsky	New York State Theater	Bolshoi Theatre	July 2
Nine Sinatra Songs	Twyla Tharp	Frank Sinatra	Twyla Tharp Dance	Queen Elizabeth Theatre	
Kënga e Rexhës	Franjo Horvat	Akil Mark Koci			

== 1984 ==
title	choreographer	composer	company	venue or presentation	date
Antique Epigraphs	Jerome Robbins	Claude Debussy	New York City Ballet	New York State Theater	February 2
Brahms/Handel	Jerome Robbins	Johannes Brahms	New York City Ballet	New York State Theater	June 7
Creole Giselle	Frederic Franklin	Adolphe Adam	Dance Theatre of Harlem	London Coliseum	July 13
Tango	Peter Martins	Igor Stravinsky	New York City Ballet	Tivoli Concert Hall	September 14

== 1985 ==
title	choreographer	composer	company	venue
In Memory of ...	Jerome Robbins	New York City Ballet	Alban Berg	New York State Theater
Valse Triste	Peter Martins	Jean Sibelius	New York City Ballet	New York State Theater

== 1988 ==
title	choreographer	composer	company
Black and White	Peter Martins	Michael Torke	New York City Ballet
The Chairman Dances	Peter Martins	John Adams	New York City Ballet
Five	Jean-Pierre Bonnefoux	Charles Wuorinen	New York City Ballet American Music Festival
Ives, Songs	Jerome Robbins	Charles Ives	New York City Ballet
The Unanswered Question	Eliot Feld	Charles Ives	New York City Ballet American Music Festival
The Newcomers	Miriam Mahdaviani	David Diamond	New York City Ballet American Music Festival
Still Life at the Penguin Cafe	David Bintley	Simon Jeffes	Royal Ballet
Woodland Sketches	Robert La Fosse	Edward MacDowell	New York City Ballet American Music Festival
Impressing the Czar	William Forsythe	Thom Willems, Ludwig van Beethoven	Ballet Frankfurt
Barber Violin Concerto	Peter Martins	Samuel Barber	New York City Ballet
