= X-Ray (ballet) =

1994 ballet by Peter Martins

X–Ray is a ballet made by New York City Ballet balletmaster in chief Peter Martins to John Adams' 1994 Violin Concerto, commissioned jointly by the Minnesota Orchestra and City Ballet. The ballet premiere took place Tuesday, November 22, 1994, at the New York State Theater, Lincoln Center; since June 1995 it has been performed as the third movement of Martins' Adams Violin Concerto ballet.

== Original cast ==
- Darci Kistler
- Nikolaj Hübbe
- Wendy Whelan
- Nilas Martins

== Reviews ==
- Kisselgoff, Anna (November 24, 1994). "City Ballet Starts With Samplings". The New York Times.
- Kisselgoff, Anna (February 26, 1995). "Straining to Scale Balanchinian Heights". The New York Times.
