= Dance suite =

Dance suite may refer to the form of the musical suite known as the suite de danses.

Dance Suite is the name of the following works:

- Dance Suite (Bartók), also known as Táncszvit and Tanz-Suite, a 1923 orchestral work by Béla Bartók.
- Dance Suite (Bernstein) for brass quintet (1989), the last composition completed by Leonard Bernstein.
- Tanz-Suite (Dance Suite), op. 29, a piano work by Hermann Reutter.
- Dance Suite from Keyboard Pieces by François Couperin, a 1923 orchestral work by Richard Strauss.
- Tanz-Suite (Dance Suite), a 1923 work for chamber ensemble by Ernst Toch.

== See also ==
- A Suite of Dances, a 1994 ballet choreographed by Jerome Robbins to 'cello music by J. S. Bach.
- Suite of Dances (from Dybbuk Variations), a 1980 ballet derived by Jerome Robbins from his 1974 ballet Dybbuk set to music by Leonard Bernstein.
- Suite of Old American Dances, a 1949 work for concert band by Robert Russell Bennett.
