= Brandenburg (ballet) =

Ballet by Jerome Robbins

- Choreographer: Jerome Robbins
- Music: Johann Sebastian Bach
- Premiere: January 22, 1997; New York State Theater
- Original ballet company: New York City Ballet
- Design: Holly Hynes; Jennifer Tipton
- Genre: Neoclassical ballet

Brandenburg is a neoclassical ballet choreographed by Jerome Robbins to compositions by Johann Sebastian Bach. Danced by a cast of twenty, the plotless ballet is set to Bach's Brandenburg Concerto No. 3, as well as individual movements from Brandenburg Concertos Nos. 1, 2 and 6. The ballet premiered on January 22, 1997, at the New York State Theater, danced by the New York City Ballet. Brandenburg is Robbins' last work.

== Choreography ==
Brandenburg is set to excerpts of Brandenburg Concertos, including the entirety of No. 3, and the second movement of No. 2, fourth movement of No. 1 and the third movement of No. 6. The ballet is danced by four principal dancers and a corps de ballet of sixteen. Jean-Pierre Frohlich, Robbins' ballet master, described the ballet as "a plotless piece in which the steps create the mood."

In his biography of Robbins, Greg Lawrence described, "the ballet began with a festive folk dance, and from there the dancing alternated between duets for the principals and group formations for the rest of the communal gathering. The configurations were often quite intricate and marked by lightning-fast transformations." Dance critics Anna Kisselgoff and Deborah Jowitt both compared the patterns in the ballet to a kaleidoscope.

Author Terry Teachout commented, "A large-scale ensemble piece structured along classical lines, it contains no implied relationships, and the dancers are not individually characterized. But a closer look reveals that it is also merely the latest in Robbins's long series of dances about dancers specifically, a corps of Robbins-style dancers performing a "neoclassical" ballet which incorporates all the choreographer's signature moves." Dance critics noticed the ballet echoes Robbins' earlier works, including Dances at a Gathering, The Goldberg Variations, Glass Pieces, Fanfare, Interplay and Fancy Free.

== Development ==
After Robbins used Bach's music for his 1971 ballet The Goldberg Variations, he did not use the composer's works again until his later life, when three of his last four ballets were set to Bach. The other two ballets were A Suite of Dances and 2 and 3 Part Inventions. Robbins began working on Brandenburg in 1995. On the music, he said, "I find the richness [of Bach] very, very exciting, thrilling, and disturbing in a way... It doesn't seem like something by an old man... He's taking strange journeys while searching out all the things he wants to find out". With his poor health, Robbins worked on and off for two years to complete the ballet, during which he had mitral valve replacement surgery, shown symptoms of Parkinson's disease, and had issues with balancing as a result of a fall. In early 1997, he felt well enough to focus on completing Brandenburg, While working on the ballet, Robbins declared, "I feel I have one more big ballet in me."

Robbins began developing the ballet as a pas de deux for two New York City Ballet principal dancers, Lourdes Lopez and Nikolaj Hübbe. Though Robbins usually inform the dancers the synopsis of the ballet from the outset, he did not tell the pair whether the pas de deux was an experiment or part of a bigger piece. He then brought in another pair of principal dancers, Wendy Whelan and Peter Boal, along with the corps de ballet. (Note: Members of the corps de ballet include Benjamin Millepied, James Fayette, Sébastien Marcovici, Jennie Somogyi and Christopher Wheeldon.)

Robbins described working with the young cast, "I can't show them what I want them to do so they all move around with stiff-legged movements imitating me and not my intentions... The kids realize I'm not my old self and are trying to be helpful. They are a lovely bunch. I don't know how they remember all the changes I make all the time." Benjamin Millepied, a member of the corps de ballet, recalled that there were months when Robbins would show the ballet to different people, which Millepied believed stemmed from the practice of workshopping on Broadway theatre. Whelan believed that Robbins knew this could be his last work and "wanted everything to be perfect and masterful."

Boal believed that Robbins choreographed 90 minutes of material but only 40 minutes are used in the ballet. According to Boal, towards the end of the creation process, Robbins was struggling to complete the finale. Peter Martins, the leader of the company, told Robbins, "You did it, you have a ballet! We could give you another year, but it's been two already." Frohlich felt that Robbins still completed the ballet quickly, and believed it was because Robbins was unable to demonstrate the steps to the dancers then reconsider it. Instead, he had to come up with a series of movements completely before giving them to the dancers.

The costumes are designed by Holly Hynes, with the dancers in peasant attires. Robbins gave many directions to her, such as "green with a little bit of yellow and not too close to blue", resulting in her re-dyeing the fabrics many times. Jennifer Tipton designed the lighting. The ballet was funded by New York City Ballet's New Combination Fund, which was founded six years prior to the premiere to support new choreography.

Brandenburg premiered on January 22, 1997, at the New York State Theater. The premiere was on the late New York City Ballet co-founder George Balanchine's birthday, and was part of the first in an annual series on his birthday. With Robbins' death in 1998, Brandenburg became his last work.

== Critical reception ==
Critic Anna Kisselgoff of The New York Times opined, "Never has Mr. Robbins moved bodies in space with such dazzling speed and density. Choreographically, he has outdone himself here."
