= Woodland Sketches (ballet) =

Ballet by Robert La Fosse

Woodland Sketches is a ballet made by Robert La Fosse to Edward MacDowell's eponymous music from 1896 for New York City Ballet's American Music Festival. The premiere took place on Thursday, May 5, 1988, at New York State Theater, Lincoln Center.

== Original cast ==
- Valentina Kozlova
- Stephanie Saland
- Stacy Caddell
- Darci Kistler
- Leonid Kozlov
- Cornel Crabtree
- Kipling Houston
- Lindsay Fischer

== Reviews ==
- NY Times review by Anna Kisselgoff, May 7, 1988
- NY Times review by Bernard Holland, May 9, 1988
- Kisselgoff, Anna (May 22, 1988). "In a Word, The Festival Was a Workshop". The New York Times.
