= Janet Sassoon =

American ballet dancer and teacher (born 1936)

- Born: 2 September 1936 (age 89); Surabaya, Indonesia.
- Occupations: ballet dancer and ballet teacher
- Career
- Former groups: San Francisco Ballet; Berlin State Ballet; Grand Ballet du Marquis de Cuevas

Janet Sassoon (born 1936) is an American former prima ballerina and ballet teacher.

== Early life ==
Sassoon was born on 2 September 1936 in Surabaya on the island of Java in what was then the Dutch East Indies and is now Indonesia. Her parents were Edward Sassoon and Flora Bar who were British and French, with a Sephardic Jewish background. She was the youngest of three children. In 1937 the family moved to the US, settling in San Francisco. Her first exposure to ballet was when she was five years old, when her mother took her to the War Memorial Opera House in San Francisco to see Romeo and Juliet by Sergei Prokofiev. Her first appearance on the stage was at the same theatre in 1944 as a child extra in the opera Falstaff by Giuseppe Verdi. Fascinated by ballet she started ballet lessons, with, among others, Lew and Willam Christensen and Gisella Caccialanza , despite her father's disapproval. At the age of 16 she moved to Paris, where she trained with teachers such as Leo Staats, Lubov Yegorova, Olga Preobrajenska and Mathilde Kschessinska.

== Dancing career ==
Sassoon began dancing in public at the Grand Ballet du Marquis de Cuevas in Paris in 1952, staying there until 1955. Subsequently, she danced in many US cities, including with Rudolf Nureyev, and returned to San Francisco to dance with the San Francisco Ballet. In 1956 she was the prima ballerina with the Berlin State Ballet and continued to dance at a high level until, at the age of 33, she had an accident while dancing that led to her retirement.

== Teaching career ==
Sassoon's father established the Academy of Ballet at 2121 Market St. in San Francisco in 1953 to offer training for children, adults, students preparing for a professional career and others. Originally known as the Pacific Ballet Company, the first directors were Guillermo Del Oro and Carolyn Parks. In 1958, Alan Howard, a principal dancer of the Ballet Russe de Monte-Carlo, became the director. When Sassoon retired from dancing, she returned to San Francisco and directed the academy until 1989, when it was sold. She then served as associate director until 1997. Among her students were Natalia Makarova, after the birth of Makarova's child, and Kyra Nichols. Sassoon did not just work in San Francisco: she also conducted master classes for the Cincinnati Ballet and the Boston Ballet. She played the role of a ballet teacher in the 1984 film Impulse.

== Publication ==
Sassoon published an autobiography in 2013, called Reverence.

== Personal life ==
Sassoon married John Roland Upton, a winemaker, in August 1983.
