= Nina Youshkevitch =

Franco-Russian ballet dancer (1920–1998)

Nina Semyonovna Youshkevitch (7 December 1920 – 3 November 1998) was a Franco-Russian ballet dancer and teacher. After a notable dancing career an injury forced her retirement, and she became a prominent ballet teacher and choreographer.

From 1978 until shortly before her death, she ran her own school, the Nina Youshkevitch Ballet Workshop in New York City.

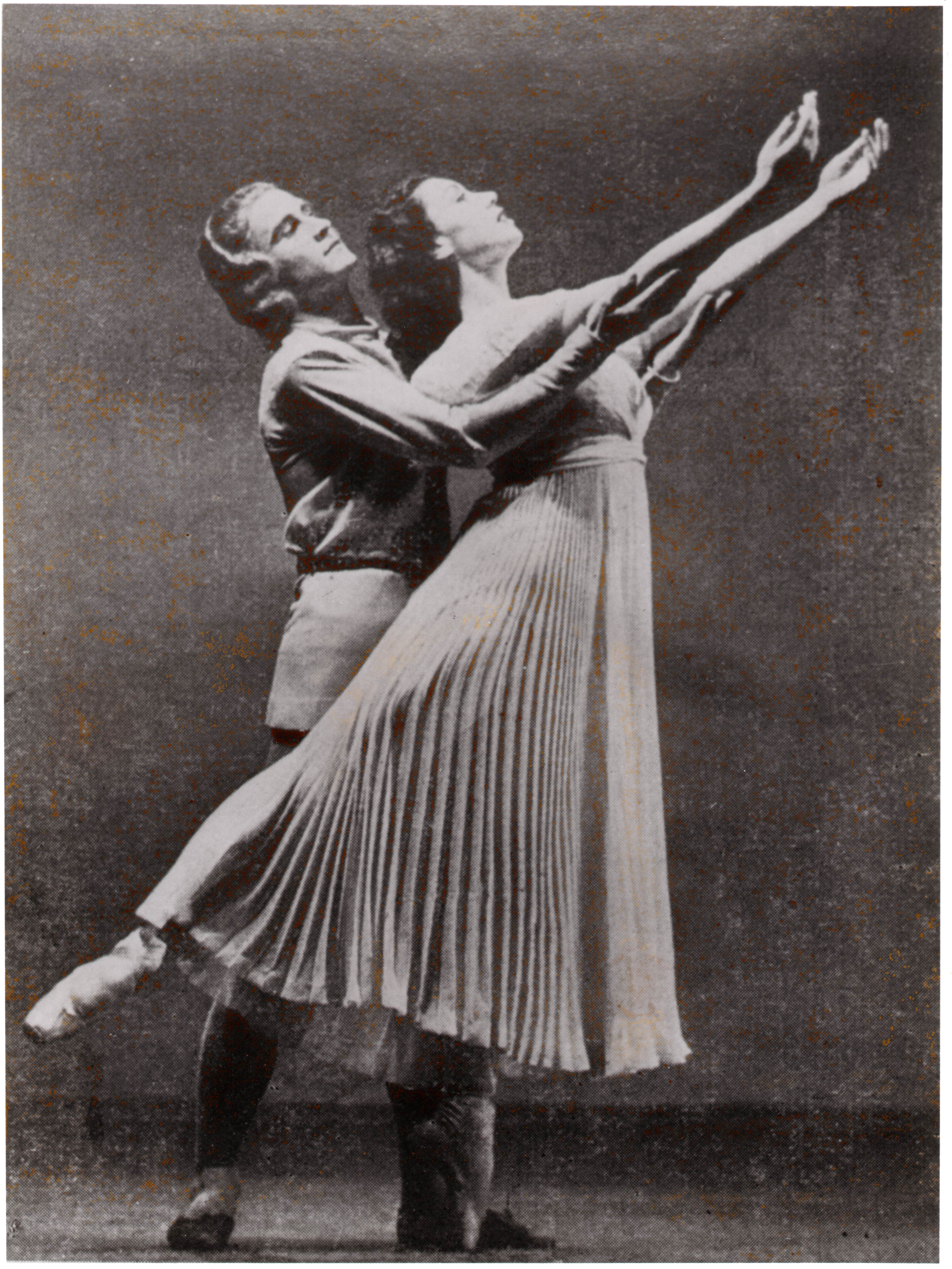
Nina Youshkevitch and Zbigniew Kilinski in Chopin Concerto, 1937

== Early life and education ==
She was born in Odessa in Soviet Ukraine, on 7 December 1920, the daughter of the playwright and novelist Semyon Yushkevich and his second wife, Anastasia Solomonovna Youshkevitch, née Selinger. Her sister was lyric soprano Natalia Semyonovna Youshkevitch. The family left war-torn Ukraine in 1921, settling in Paris where they became French citizens. Youshkevitch trained with former ballerinas of the Mariinsky Theatre Olga Preobrajenska, and Lubov Egorova, and with French choreographer and ballet master Leo Staats. She also studied at the École du Louvre; and graduated in piano from the Conservatoire de Paris.

== Dancing career ==
Youshkevitch was a protegee of Bronislava Nijinska, who in 1930 brought her into the corps de ballet of the Opéra Russe à Paris. Staats also employed her in works that he staged for the summer season on the Côte d'Azure, including ballets on a floating, open-air stage; and in the Walpurgisnacht ballet in Faust, at the Nice Opera. In 1934, Youshkevitch joined the Théâtre de la Danse Nijinska where she made her debut as La Dame en Bleu in the ballet Les Biches; performed as the Bride in Le Baiser de la Fée; and danced en travesti among the men in Nijinska's Bolero. Along with other members of Nijinska's company, Youshkevitch went on to join the Ballets Russes for its 1934 Monte Carlo season. There she danced the Waltz in Les Sylphides, and appeared among the Amazones and Russian peasants in Nijinska's Variations.

Youshkevitch was a principal dancer on the Ballets Russes' first tour of Australia and New Zealand in 1936–1937. Here she starred as the Princess in Nijinska's ballet Les Cent Baisers, as Odette in Le Lac des Cygnes, and as Aurora in Aurora's Wedding. She danced the role of the Principal Nymph in Vaslav Nijinsky's L'Après-midi d'un faune; appeared as Action in Léonide Massine's Les Présages; and played leading roles in Massine's Les Contes Russes and in Michel Fokine's Carnaval and Les Sylphides. British dance critic Arnold Haskell, who accompanied the tour, wrote of her: "As a dancer the most astonishing was Nina Youchkevitch...she has an unusual sense of music and the grand manner that made her performances in Aurora's Wedding and The Swan Lake absolutely unforgettable...Among the younger dancers of this company she is the one obvious hundred percent classical ballerina."

She followed her mentor, Nijinska, to Poland in 1937, where the latter founded the Balet Polski aka Les Ballets Polonais aka The Polish Ballets. In this company, which won Grand Prix for performance and for choreography at the Exposition Internationale in Paris that year, Youshkevitch created principal roles in the ballets Concerto de Chopin, Apollon et la Belle, and Le Rappel. The troupe went on to perform in London and in Berlin. Youshkevitch remained with the company after Nijinska's departure, performing with them at the 1939 World's Fair in New York City.

Narrowly escaping from Poland before the Nazi invasion, Youshkevitch returned to Paris. Nijinska invited her to reprise her role in Chopin Concerto at the Hollywood Bowl in 1940. Though Nijinska's telegram did not reach her until the concert had already taken place, it enabled Youshkevitch to receive a visa to travel to America; and she performed again in Chopin Concerto at the Jacob's Pillow Dance Festival in 1942. In the United States, she toured with the Polish company of Felix Sadowski; and performed with the Metropolitan Opera Ballet. She appeared as Aurora in The Sleeping Beauty, sponsored by the San Francisco Russian Opera and Ballet Association in 1945. Billed as the first full-length production of Petipa's ballet in the United States, in three acts and a prologue; it was the first full-length Sleeping Beauty on the West Coast.

== Teaching and choreography career ==
After retiring from the stage because of an injury, Youshkevitch began teaching at Nijinska's Hollywood Dance Studio; and at the Carnegie Hall studios in New York. She founded her own concert group called The Nina Youshkevitch Ballet Workshop, in New York City. After her marriage, she taught for 13 years at Wayne State College, in Wayne, Nebraska. She opened her own dance school, also called the Nina Youshkevitch Ballet Workshop, in New York City in 1978; and continued to teach there until shortly before her death. Among her students was Jennie Somogyi, later a principal with New York City Ballet.

In 1990, Youshkevitch assisted Irina Nijinska, in reviving the Bride's Variation from Le Baiser de la Fée, at the New York Public Library for the Performing Arts. In 1995, working from notations, Youshkevitch revived Bronislava Nijinska's ballet Bolero for the Oakland Ballet, in California. She went on to revive Chopin Concerto for the students of Goucher College, in Towson, Maryland, in 1995–1996; and staged the ballet's second movement pas de deux for the Oakland Ballet in 1997. She was preparing to stage the full Chopin Concerto for the Oakland Ballet when she died.

== Personal life ==
She married Robert Johnson, and they had one son, who in 1998 was dance critic for The Newark Star-Ledger. She died in Manhattan, at Roosevelt Hospital, on 3 November 1998.
