= Adams Violin Concerto =

Ballet

Adams Violin Concerto is a ballet made by Peter Martins, New York City Ballet's official master in chief, set to 1994 eponymous music by John Adams. The "space age quintet" ballet was commissioned jointly by the Minnesota Orchestra, the London Symphony Orchestra, and City Ballet.

The Adams Violin Concerto ballet premiere, the first time John Adams' concerto was heard in Manhattan, took place on 1 June 1995 at the New York State Theater, Lincoln Center; the third movement was danced earlier under the title X-Ray.

== Original cast ==
- Nikolaj Hübbe
- Darci Kistler
- Nilas Martins
- Jock Soto
- Wendy Whelan
