= Zakouski =

Zakouski may refer to:

- Zakuski, Russian and Polish appetizer in buffet style
- Zakouski (ballet)
