= Sea of Light =

Sea of Light may refer to:

- Daria-i-Noor ('Sea of Light'), one of the largest cut diamonds in the world
- Sea of Light (album), by Uriah Heep, 1995

== See also ==
- River of Light, a ballet
