= Benjamin Millepied =

French multi oriented dancer and choreographer (born 1977)

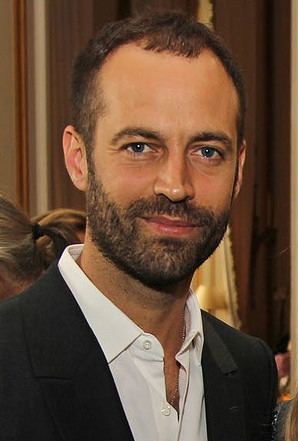
- Millepied in 2015
- Born: 10 June 1977 (age 49); Bordeaux, France
- Education: Conservatoire National; School of American Ballet
- Occupations: Choreographer; ballet dancer
- Years active: 2001–present
- Spouse: Natalie Portman (m. 2012; div. 2024)
- Children: 2
- Dancing career
- Current group: L.A. Dance Project
- Former groups: New York City Ballet

Benjamin Millepied (French pronunciation: [bɛ̃ʒamɛ᷉ milpje]; born 10 June 1977) is a French dancer and choreographer who has lived and worked in the United States since joining the New York City Ballet in 1995, where he became a soloist in 1998 and a principal in 2002. He has also created choreography for the company, and choreographed pieces for other major company. He retired from the NYCB in 2011.

He initiated the LA Dance Project, leading it from 2011 to 2014. He was the Director of Dance at the Paris Opera Ballet from October 2014 to 2016. He choreographed and performed as a dancer in the 2010 movie Black Swan, and choreographed the "sandwalk" in Dune. He made his feature film directorial debut with Carmen (2022), starring Paul Mescal and Melissa Barrera.

== Early life ==
Millepied was born in Bordeaux, France. He is the youngest of three sons. His ballet training started at the age of eight with his mother, Catherine Flory, a former ballet dancer. His father is Denys Millepied. Between the ages of 11 and 16, he studied with Michel Rahn at the Conservatoire National in Lyon, France.

== Career ==
In the summer of 1992 Millepied attended classes at the School of American Ballet (SAB) and returned to study full-time in 1993, with a scholarship from the French Ministry (Bourse Lavoisier or Lavoisier Scholarship). Early in his career, Millepied was mentored by choreographer Jerome Robbins, who took an interest in him. At SAB's 1994 Spring Workshop he originate a principal role in Jerome Robbins' premiere of 2 and 3 Part Inventions and also received the Prix de Lausanne.

=== New York City Ballet, 1995–2011 ===
Millepied joined New York City Ballet's corps de ballet in 1995, was promoted to soloist in 1998 and became principal dancer in 2002.

Millepied also became a choreographer, creating dances for City Ballet, American Ballet Theatre, the School of American Ballet, the Metropolitan Opera, the Paris Opera Ballet, Ballet de Genève, and his own company, Danses Concertantes. From 2006 to 2007, he was choreographer-in-residence at the Baryshnikov Arts Center in New York.

On 26 October 2011, the media announced that Millepied would retire from New York City Ballet.

=== L.A. Dance Project, 2011–present ===
In 2011, L.A. Dance Project, founded and directed by Millepied, was launched with a commission, expected to last two years, from Glorya Kaufman Presents Dance at the Los Angeles Music Center. The company's operating budget is about $1 million a year. Millepied partnered with composer Nico Muhly, producer Charles Fabius, composer Nicholas Britell, and Matthieu Humery to found the company. In 2012, L.A. Dance Project established a full-time residence at Los Angeles Theatre Center with the objective of presenting new works throughout the city. L.A. Dance Project's inaugural performance, commissioned by The Music Center was held at Walt Disney Concert Hall on 22 September 2012.

Later that year, Millepied and L.A. Dance Project dancer Amanda Wells performed a 30-minute duet entitled "Framework" at the Museum of Contemporary Art. The dance collective's first program featured a Millepied premiere, Moving Parts, with a score by Muhly and visual design by painter Christopher Wool. The program also includes a revival of Merce Cunningham's 1964 Winterbranch, a movement exploration of falling bodies set to a mostly two-note score by La Monte Young, and William Forsythe's Quintett, a 1993 study in loss and hope to avant-garde composer Gavin Bryars' composition Jesus' Blood Never Failed Me Yet. Millepied's collaborators include Rodarte, Barbara Kruger, and Alex Israel, a contemporary California painter and video artist.

The premiere of "Reflections" by Millepied took place at Theatre du Chatelet in Paris on 23 April 2013. In 2013, L.A. Dance Project continued to tour at the Holland Festival in Amsterdam, Istanbul, Spoleto Festival in Italy, Edinburgh International Festival, La Maison de la Danse in Lyon, France and Sadler's Wells Theatre in London. In September 2013, at Maison de la Danse in Lyon, the company premiered two new pieces. The first premiere was Murder Ballads, choreographed by Justin Peck with music by Bryce Dessner. Next on the program was the premiere of Morgan's Last Chug choreographed and with light and sound design by Emanuel Gat.

In January 2014, L.A. Dance Project announced that its new home venue would be the Theatre at Ace Hotel. By June 2016, L.A. Dance Project formed a three-year partnership with the LUMA Foundation in Arles, France, offering the nine-member company a continuing residency and performance space in the foundation's Parc des Ateliers. L.A. Dance Project will spend five non-consecutive weeks a year in Arles, where the company will be able to work, create and produce.

=== Paris Opera Ballet, 2014–2016 ===
In January 2013, the Paris Opera Ballet announced that Millepied had accepted the position of director of dance. He officially succeeded Brigitte Lefèvre on 15 October 2014.

During his time at the Paris Opera Ballet, Millepied brought in William Forsythe as an associate choreographer and collaborator on the new Academy, an in-house training program for choreographers. Millepied's first season opened with a celebrity-filled gala that raised over a million euros. He also established a digital platform for new work and organized dancer exchanges with the Mariinsky and American Ballet Theatre.

Reset, a ballet documentary by Thierry Demaizière and Alban Teurlai, featured Millepied as he mounted his first production as director of the Paris Opera ballet. It premiered in France on Canal+ in December 2015. It later had its North American premiere at the Tribeca Film Festival.

Millepied resigned from the Paris Opera Ballet on 4 February 2016 and was succeeded by Aurélie Dupont.

=== Other activities ===
Millepied has commissioned and collaborated with contemporary composers including David Lang, Nico Muhly, Thierry Escaich, Daniel Ott, and Philip Glass. The Jerome Robbins Trust and Foundation has underwritten Millepied's work and donors include philanthropists Anne Bass and Arlene Cooper.

In 2001, Millepied's dancing was motion-captured for the animated children's film Barbie in the Nutcracker, along with that of other New York City Ballet dancers. His dancing was again captured for the 2003 Barbie film Barbie of Swan Lake.

In 2009, he served as choreographer for Black Swan, a psychological thriller directed by Darren Aronofsky which stars Natalie Portman and Mila Kunis as ballet dancers in New York City. He also danced and appeared in the film. In 2010, he was the leading man in a short film co-directed by Asa Mader and starring Léa Seydoux, called Time Doesn't Stand Still.

In 2012, Millepied founded The Amoveo Company, a multimedia production company and art collective. He has directed a number of short films in collaboration with various artists, including Mark Bradford, Philip Glass, Io Echo, Zeds Dead, and Lil Buck.

On the invitation of Los Angeles Music Center board member and TV host Nigel Lythgoe, Millepied was a guest judge on the dance competition show So You Think You Can Dance on 22 August 2012.

In 2014, Millepied became the Artistic Advisor of the new Dance Academy at the Colburn School in Downtown Los Angeles, joining fellow former-principal dancers with the New York City Ballet, Jenifer Ringer and James Fayette.

== Recognition ==
In 1994, he received the Prix de Lausanne and the next year, he was the recipient of the Mae L. Wien Award for Outstanding Promise.

In 2010, he was made Chevalier in the Order of Arts and Letters by the French Ministry of Culture.

== Personal life ==
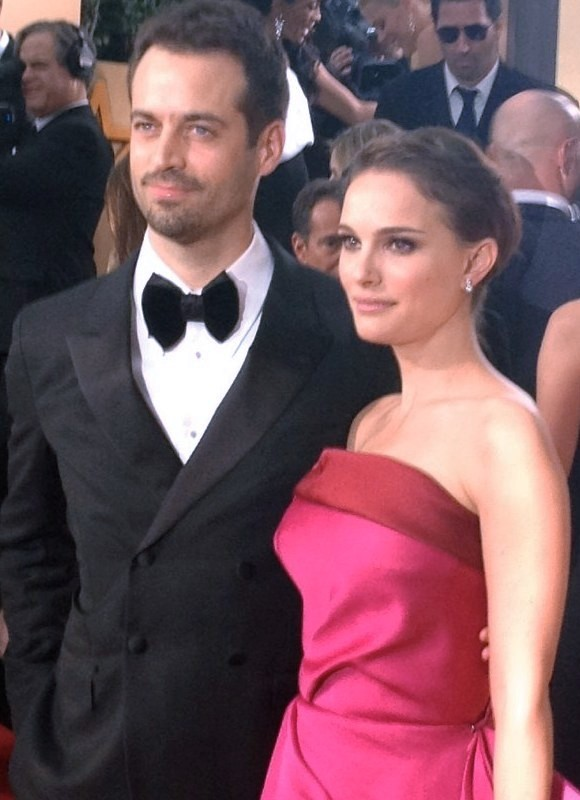
Millepied with then-wife Natalie Portman in 2012

Millepied met actress Natalie Portman on the set of Black Swan in early 2009 and left his partner at the time, Isabella Boylston, a principal dancer at the American Ballet Theatre, to begin a relationship with Portman. Millepied and Portman wed in a Jewish ceremony held in Big Sur, California on 4 August 2012. The family lived in Paris for a time, after Millepied accepted the position of director of dance with the Paris Opera Ballet. They have two children: a son Aleph (b. 2011) and a daughter Amalia (b. 2017). In January 2014, Millepied said he was in the process of converting to Judaism (his wife's faith). In 2016, the family moved from Paris to Los Angeles. Portman and Millepied separated in 2023 after it was widely documented that Millepied was having an extramarital affair. Their divorce was finalized in March 2024.

== Choreography ==
| Year | Title | Venue | Notes |
|---|---|---|---|
| 2001 | Passages | Conservatoire National | |
| 2002 | Clapping Music | Conservatoire National | Music by Steve Reich |
| 2002 | Triple Duet | Sadler's Wells Theatre | Music by J. S. Bach |
| 2003 | Double Aria | Bay Street Theater | |
| 2004 | On The Other Side | Sadler's Wells Theatre | |
| 2005 | 24 Variations of a Theme by Paganini | School of American Ballet | |
| 2005 | Circular Motion | Florence Gould Hall | |
| 2006 | Closer | Joyce Theater | Music and live accompaniment by Philip Glass |
| 2006 | Amoveo | Paris Opera Ballet | Set designs by Paul Cox, costumes by Marc Jacobs |
| 2009 | Everything Doesn't Happen At Once | Avery Fisher Hall | Music by David Lang |
| 2009 | Quasi Una Fantasia | New York City Ballet | |
| 2009 | Sarabande | New York City Ballet | |
| 2010 | Plainspoken | New York City Ballet | Music by David Lang |
| 2010 | Why am I not where you are | Lincoln Center for the Performing Arts | Music by Thierry Escaich, scenery by Santiago Calatrava |
| 2010 | One Thing Leads to Another | Het National Ballet | Music by Nico Muhly, costumes by Rodarte |
| 2011 | Troika | American Ballet Theatre | |
| 2011 | The Bartered Bride | Metropolitan Opera | |
| 2012 | Khovanshchina | Metropolitan Opera | |

== Originated roles ==
| Year | Title | Choreographer | Notes |
|---|---|---|---|
| 1997 | Slavonic Dances | Christopher Wheeldon | Part of the Diamond Project |
| 1997 | Brandenburg | Jerome Robbins | |
| 1997 | La Stravaganza | Angelin Preljocaj | |
| 1998 | Les Noces | Jerome Robbins | |
| 1998 | Concerti Armonici | Peter Martins | |
| 1999 | Swan Lake | Peter Martins | |
| 2000 | Prism | Helgi Tómasson | Part of the Diamond Project |
| 2002 | If By Chance | Melissa Barak | Part of the Diamond Project |
| 2002 | Twilight Courante | Stephen Baynes | Part of the Diamond Project |
| 2002 | Hallelujah Junction | Peter Martins | Part of the Diamond Project |
| 2003 | Guide to Strange Places | Peter Martins | |
| 2004 | Circle of Fifths | Christopher d'Amboise | |
| 2004 | Musagète | Boris Eifman | |
| 2004 | Octet | Peter Martins | |

== Featured roles ==
George Balanchine

- Agon
- Ballo della Regina
- Chaconne
- Coppélia
  - Frantz
- Divertimento from Le Baiser de la fée
- Donizetti Variations
- The Nutcracker
- Harlequinade
  - Harlequin
- Jewels
  - Rubies
- A Midsummer Night's Dream
- Raymonda Variations
- La Sonnambula
- La Source
- Stars and Stripes
- Symphony in C
- Symphony in Three Movements
- Tarantella
- Tschaikovsky Pas de Deux
- Tschaikovsky Suite No. 3
  - Theme and Variations
- Union Jack
- Valse-Fantaisie
- Western Symphony

August Bournonville

- Bournonville Divertissements

Peter Martins

- Ash
- Fearful Symmetries
- Jeu de cartes
- Quartet for Strings
- The Sleeping Beauty
- Stabat Mater
- Swan Lake
  - Siegfried
- Tschaikovsky Pas de Quatre
- Zakouski

Jerome Robbins

- 2 and 3 Part Inventions
- Dances at a Gathering
- Fancy Free
- Fanfare
- The Four Seasons
- Interplay
- Piano Pieces
- West Side Story Suite

Richard Tanner

- Soirée

Christopher Wheeldon

- Carousel (A Dance)
- Mercurial Manoeuvres

== Filmography ==
| Year | Film | Role | Notes |
|---|---|---|---|
| 2001 | Barbie in the Nutcracker | New York City Ballet Dancer | |
| 2003 | Barbie of Swan Lake | New York City Ballet Dancer | |
| 2010 | Black Swan | David Moreau/The Prince | |
| 2011 | Time Doesn't Stand Still | Lui | Short film |
| 2012 | Aria | Director | Short |
| 2012 | Bacchanale | Director | Short |
| 2012 | Io Echo: Eye Father | Director | Music video |
| 2012 | Io Echo: Stalemate | Director | Music video |
| 2012 | Naran Ja | Creative Director | Short |
| 2012 | Medusa | Director | Short |
| 2012 | Framework | Choreographer & Dancer | Short |
| 2013 | Zeds Dead: Demons | Director | Music video |
| 2013 | Reflections | Director | Short |
| 2014 | Forest Swords: The Weight Of Gold | Director | Music video |
| 2022 | Carmen | Director | Feature film |

== See also ==
- Black Swan dance double controversy
