= Plainspoken =

Plainspoken is a ballet made by principal dancer Benjamin Millepied on the Chamber Ensemble of New York City Ballet to eponymous music commissioned from Pulitzer Prize winner David Lang. The premiere took place on Friday, August 6, 2010, at the Center for the Arts, Jackson Hole, Wyoming; the NYCB premiere took place at the Fall gala on Thursday, October 7, at the David H. Koch Theater, Lincoln Center. Costumes were designed by Karen Young.

== Casts ==
=== Original ===
- Sterling Hyltin
- Teresa Reichlen
- Jennie Somogyi
- Janie Taylor
- Tyler Angle
- Amar Ramasar
- Sébastien Marcovici
- Jared Angle

== Reviews ==
- NY Times by Alastair Macaulay, October 9, 2010
- Wall Street Journal by Robert Greskovic, October 14, 2010
- NY Times by Roslyn Sulcas, October 17, 2010

== Articles ==
- NY Times by Chelsea Zalopany, October 8, 2010
