= Two and Three Part Inventions =

Two and Three Part Inventions may refer to:

- 2 and 3 Part Inventions, a ballet made by Jerome Robbins
- Inventions and Sinfonias, a collection of thirty short keyboard compositions by Johann Sebastian Bach
