= Zenobia (ballet) =

Ballet by George Balanchine

The Zenobia Pas de Deux is a ballet made by George Balanchine, subsequently co-founder and founding choreographer of the New York City Ballet for Richard Rodgers's 1936 musical On Your Toes, in which it was performed under the title La Princesse Zenobia Ballet. Balanchine parodies such Oriental-style ballets as Schéhérazade. The City Ballet premiere took place on Tuesday, November 23, 1993, at the New York State Theater, Lincoln Center.

== Casts ==
=== Original ===
- Tamara Geva
- Demetrios Vilan
- William Baker
- George Church

=== NYCB ===
- Darci Kistler
- Igor Zelensky

== Reviews ==
- NY Times review by Brooks Atkinson, April 13, 1936
- Kisselgoff, Anna (November 25, 1993). "Review/Dance; City Ballet Honors Broadway and Hollywood". The New York Times.
