= Jennie Somogyi =

American ballet dancer

- Born: Jennie Renee Somogyi; 1977 or 1978 (age 48–49); Easton, Pennsylvania, U.S.
- Education: School of American Ballet
- Occupation: ballet dancer
- Children: 2
- Dancing career
- Former groups: New York City Ballet
- Website: jsballet.co

Jennie Renee Somogyi (pronounced sa-mo-JEE or sum-O-gee; born 1977 or 1978) is an American former ballet dancer. She joined the New York City Ballet in 1993, at age 15, became a principal dancer in 2000, and retired in 2015.

== Early life and training ==
Jennie Renee Somogyi was born in Easton, Pennsylvania, to a mechanic father and receptionist mother, and was raised in Alpha, New Jersey. She first trained in gymnastics at the Parkettes National Gymnastics Training Center in Allentown, Pennsylvania at age 6. Due to her talents, she was placed with older children. The instructor at the center recommended Somogyi to also study dance as other children also do so. Recognizing Somogyi's talent, a family friend suggested her to train with Nina Youshkevitch, who had studied under Bronislava Nijinska, and the friend offered to drive her to New York for the lessons and to pay for them. At age 9, she entered the School of American Ballet on scholarship. The following year, she danced Marie in Balanchine's The Nutcracker with the New York City Ballet. One of her teachers at the school was Suki Schorer. She won the Princess Grace Award in 1992 and the Mae L. Wien Award in 1993.

== Career ==
Somogyi became an apprentice with the New York City in 1993, at age 15 and while she was still a high school sophomore. She became one of the youngest dancers ever to join the company. She was offered the apprenticeship after she performed the lead role in Balanchine's Allegro Brillante in the School of American Ballet workshop performance. She joined the corps de ballet the following year. She was promoted to soloist in 1998 and principal dancer in 2000. Over the course of her career, she had danced over 70 roles, and was also often cast in Balanchine ballets that are associated with Kyra Nichols. She had created roles for Jerome Robbins, Christopher Wheeldon, Benjamin Millepied and Susan Stroman.

In her entire career, she had only been injured three times, but all three were "catastrophic" and happened while she was performing. She tore her left foot posterior tibial tendon in 2004, her right foot Achilles tendon in 2012 and the same left foot tendon again in 2013. For her last injury, she had a donor transplant, which is rarely done on a foot.

Shortly after she returned from her last major injury, she announced that she would retire. Her final performance was on October 11, 2015, in which she danced the role Violette Verdy created in Balanchine's Liebeslieder Walzer, one of her favorite ballet, and a role Nichols had danced for many years. In 2017, she opened the Jennie Somogyi Ballet Academy in her hometown of Easton, Pennsylvania.

== Personal life ==
Somogyi is married and has two children. During her dance career, she commuted between Alpha, New Jersey and New York City. After she retired, the family moved to Pohatcong Township, New Jersey.
