= Black Swan dance double controversy =

Film credit controversy surrounding the 2010 film Black Swan

The Black Swan dance double controversy concerns an American film and the credit its production gave to performers. Black Swan is a 2010 American psychological horror film about a ballerina directed by Darren Aronofsky and starring Natalie Portman, Vincent Cassel, and Mila Kunis. After the 83rd Academy Awards, where Portman won Best Actress for her performance in the film as a ballerina, controversy arose over how much credit for the dancing in the film was being given to her and how much to her "dance double", American Ballet Theatre soloist Sarah Lane.

In a March 3, 2011 blog post (written prior to the DVD release) for Dance Magazine, its editor-in-chief Wendy Perron asked why a visual effects video clip showing Lane's face being replaced by Portman's had been available online but was removed prior to the Oscars. She also speculated as to whether Portman's omission of Lane's name during her acceptance speech was a case of "forgetfulness in the heat of the moment? Or was this omission, and the deletion from the video, planned by the studio's publicity machine?" It was also noted that Lane is credited as "Lady in the Lane" and as "Stunts" rather than as Portman's double in the theatrical release of the film. This led to a number of responses regarding Portman. Aronofsky and Fox Searchlight issued a joint statement, arguing: "We were fortunate to have Sarah there to cover the more complicated dance sequences and we have nothing but praise for the hard work she did. However, Natalie herself did most of the dancing featured in the final film." Benjamin Millepied and Kunis also argued in defense of Portman's dancing. Lane responded through an essay published in The Wall Street Journal (Portman declined through a representative to write one as well) and an interview on 20/20 that her interest lies primarily in defense of ballet as an art form that cannot be mastered in a year.

The DVD of Black Swan was released on March 29, 2011 and includes the featurette with Sarah Lane.

== Before the Academy Awards ==
The film's director Darren Aronofsky stated in a July 2010 interview: "Most of these women who are here started dancing when they were 4, 5, or 6 years old. Their bodies are shaped differently because they started so young. She was able to pull it off. Except for the wide shots when she has to be en pointe for a real long time, it's Natalie on screen. I haven't used her double a lot." Another time when asked whether Portman did all the dancing, he replied "Not everything, but a lot of it. That shot, in the opening prologue when she walks off into the light and she’s flapping her wings, and she’s on pointe, that is 100%, untouched, no digital Natalie Portman. When the camera pulls out on her and she’s on top of the ramp and she’s bleeding, and she’s on pointe, right before she jumps—that is Natalie Portman en pointe".

In a November 29, 2010 interview, Portman's other dance double, Kimberly Prosa, also added: "Natalie took class, she studied for several months, from the waist up is her. Sarah Lane a soloist at ABT, did the heavy tricks, she did the fouettés, but they only had her for a limited time, a couple of weeks, so I did the rest of whatever dance shots they needed." In addition, Portman said in an interview with MSN: "I did everything, and the dance double — Sarah Lane, who's a really wonderful dancer — they shot us both doing everything, but because most of the film is in close-up, they're able to use me. The parts I couldn't do were because it's doing very complicated turns en pointe. They would shoot me doing it in flat shoes and Sarah doing it in pointe shoes and find a way to make that work." She also stated in a November 2010 interview with WBUR that "there's a wonderful dancer, Sarah Lane, who did the more complicated pointe work. But I did the stuff that was possible to learn in a year."

In December 2010, Lane also gave an interview to Kina Poon of Dance Magazine in which she responds to the question "and how does it feel to be part of a performance that some critics are giving Natalie Portman rave reviews for?" by saying that "I'm not really looking for any sort of recognition. The process was a huge learning experience and I got everything I wanted out of it. But [Portman] deserves the recognition. She worked really hard." Lane's involvement in Black Swan was also mentioned in two other dance magazines and in an article on The New York Times website.

== Perron's blog ==
After the Oscar ceremony on February 27, 2011 in which Portman won the Academy Award for Best Actress and where she thanked many people but did not mention Lane, dancer and editor-in-chief of Dance Magazine Wendy Perron published a March 3, 2011 blog post in which she asks why a visual effects video clip showing Lane's face being replaced by Portman's was once available online but later removed from the Internet prior to the Oscars. She also speculates as to whether Portman deliberately did not mention Lane, by asking if this was a case of "forgetfulness in the heat of the moment? Or was this omission, and the deletion from the video, planned by the studio's publicity machine?" Perron also asks, "Do people really believe that it takes only one year to make a ballerina? We know that Natalie Portman studied ballet as a kid and had a year of intensive training for the film, but that doesn't add up to being a ballerina. However, it seems that many people believe that Portman did her own dancing in Black Swan."

Perron followed up the next week with a second blog post on the subject. She interviewed Lane, who states that she did not expect to be named during Portman's acceptance speech because a Fox Searchlight producer had asked her to stop giving interviews until after the Oscars were over: "They were trying to create this façade that [Portman] had become a ballerina in a year and a half ... So I knew they didn't want to publicize anything about me." Perron then states that Lane "says she was more offended by that myth than any slight to her as a dancer who worked 'painstaking' hours on the set. She says she's talked to her colleagues about 'how unfortunate it is that, as professional dancers, we work so hard, but people can actually believe that it's easy enough to do it in a year. That's the thing that bothered me the most."

== Aftermath ==
=== Millepied ===
Benjamin Millepied (Portman's ex-husband and a principal dancer from New York City Ballet who debuted in Black Swan as both actor and choreographer) responded to Perron's blog in a March 23 interview with the Los Angeles Times. He states in this interview that "there are articles now talking about her dance double [American Ballet Theatre dancer Sarah Lane] that are making it sound like [Lane] did a lot of the work, but really, she just did the footwork, and the fouettés, and one diagonal [phrase] in the studio. Honestly, 85% of that movie is Natalie."

=== Lane ===
Lane was then asked about the subject in a March 25 interview with Entertainment Weekly to which she responded that "of the full body shots, I would say 5 percent are Natalie ... All the other shots are me." In a later interview with Christopher John Farley of The Wall Street Journal, Lane states that...

I did all of the dancing. Natalie and I alternated shots. They would do close-up shots with her, just of her face and kind of from her arms up. Then they would do the same shot with me, and then they would do a full body shot from far away, or a close-up of my feet, etc. And then there were a few shots they did that were closer full body shots and then they digitally put her face on my body.

This happened, she states, because only someone who has had years of training is able to perform in this manner. On the subject of whether she was being credited as she "deserves", she said, "Definitely not" and elaborates...

It was all my fault really because I didn't have a manager ... When I was going to sign my contract, it said on screen credit is up to the producer's discretion .... So I signed the contract and I left it. I thought they would kind of take care of me because they were really encouraging and really sweet and always saying how amazing I was. They were kind of rooting me on when I would have to do shots that were really hard and almost impossible even for a professional ballet dancer.

However, she states that her response to the issue of credit is being misrepresented as it is "kind of making me look greedy". Instead she was actually responding to Perron's blog about the possibility of a "cover-up" and wanted to clarify that "I do want people to know that you cannot absolutely become a professional ballet dancer in a year and a half no matter how hard you work. I've been doing this for 22 years." Lane also reiterates that she was asked by producers to stop giving interviews until after the Oscars were over and as to why she thinks that happened, explained:

I had read a lot of articles that Natalie had done where she said she did 90 percent of the dancing. And never mentioned my name once. Nobody ever mentioned my name hardly ever. I'm not stupid, I got the idea that they really want to make it look like she [Portman] had accomplished something incredible.

Lane continued, "I do want people to know that she did work really hard. And she lost a lot of weight so that if you looked at her, you would say she could pass from the arms up as a dancer. She's an amazing actor. I can't act like that. But to say that she did all of the dancing is absolutely ridiculous to anyone that knows anything about ballet."

=== Aronofsky and Fox Searchlight ===
In response, people involved with the film (particularly Aronofsky) and Fox Searchlight disputed Lane's claim. They released statements that stated: "We were fortunate to have Sarah there to cover the more complicated dance sequences and we have nothing but praise for the hard work she did. However, Natalie herself did most of the dancing featured in the final film." Aronofsky stated in an interview with Entertainment Weekly:

I had my editor count shots. There are 139 dance shots in the film. 111 are Natalie Portman untouched. 28 are her dance double Sarah Lane. If you do the math, that's 80% Natalie Portman. What about duration? The shots that feature the double are wide shots and rarely play for longer than one second. There are two complicated longer dance sequences that we used face replacement. Even so, if we were judging by time, over 90% would be Natalie Portman. And to be clear, Natalie did dance on pointe in pointe shoes. If you look at the final shot of the opening prologue, which lasts 85 seconds, and was danced completely by Natalie, she exits the scene on pointe. That is completely her without any digital magic. I am responding to this to put this to rest and to defend my actor. Natalie sweated long and hard to deliver a great physical and emotional performance. And I don't want anyone to think that's not her they are watching. It is.

=== Kunis ===
Mila Kunis, Portman's co-star in the film, also gave an interview with Entertainment Weekly in which she said, "Natalie danced her ass off" and that "[Portman will] tell you [that], no, she was not on pointe when she did a fouetté [turn]. No one's going to deny that. But she did do every ounce of every one of her dances .... [Lane] wasn't used for everything. It was more like a safety net. If Nat wasn't able to do something, you'd have a safety net. The same thing that I had — I had a double as a safety net. We all did. No one ever denied it".

=== Perron ===
In an email exchange with Farley published on March 28 in The Wall Street Journal, Wendy Perron stated, "the publicity department for Fox Searchlight, the studio behind the film, is just 'doing its job' in promoting Portman's work". She also noted: "'Natalie did most of the dancing where you see her in closeup, and she worked hard to make them convincing', Perron said via email. 'Obviously, the far shots plus the pirouettes and closeups on the feet were Sarah or another double.'"

== Lane and Portman further responses ==
=== Lane The Wall Street Journal essay ===
On March 30, The Wall Street Journal published an essay by Lane on the subject. (It had asked both Portman and Lane to write about these events, but Portman declined through a representative.) Lane's essay, "My (Double) Life as A Black Swan", describes the life of a ballet dancer and concludes by stating:

I know that some people are getting very defensive about Black Swan and my role in it, but back-stabbing is not my purpose when people ask me about the legitimacy of the dance shots in the movie. I only care to speak the truth. The truth is that no one, not Natalie Portman, or even myself can come anywhere close to the level of a professional ballerina in a year and a half. Period. That doesn't mean that I don't admire Natalie and her acting. She is so talented and can inspire people, as well, with her own art form. She did an amazing job portraying her character in Black Swan. (Though the movie wasn't a completely realistic reflection of ballet or dancers.) My only wish is that Natalie, Darren, and certain others who worked closely on the movie could have grasped the beauty and the heart of true ballet. If they had, they would have advocated for this art more and given the real dancers the credit that they deserve.

=== Portman E! interview ===
In an April 6 interview with E!, Natalie Portman responded to the question: "What do you want to say to people who are questioning your dancing in the film?" by stating: "I had a chance to make something beautiful with this film and I don't want to give in to the gossip". She also said, "I know what went on. We had an amazing experience making the movie. I don't want to tarnish it by entering into nastiness .... I'm really proud of everyone's work on the movie and of my experience. And I'll have that forever. So it's nice for me to always know about that, no matter what kind of nastiness or gossip is going around." In response to a question regarding her Oscar acceptance speech, Portman responded, "I don't remember my Oscar speech at all, and I'm actually too embarrassed to watch it."

=== Lane 20/20 interview ===
In an April 15 interview with Elizabeth Vargas for ABC's 20/20, Lane stated: "I didn't really specify anything in my contract about getting onscreen credit or anything ... I didn't do the movie to get fame or recognition or anything." She added, "I'm not speaking because I feel like I should be heralded .... I'm speaking because [the filmmakers] are completely lying about the amount of dancing Natalie did in the movie. When those incorrect things are coming out, and they threaten the entire principle of ballet, then I feel like I need to say something." When Vargas asked if it is possible that both interpretations of the "math" can be correct, Lane responded: "It's possible, like I said, if you're counting the close-ups of her face as actual dancing shots. But I don't call close-ups of her face actual dancing."

20/20 also asked Black Swan editor Andy Weisblum for his take on the math. He responded that "there are about 35 shots that are full body shots in the movie. Of those 35 shots, 12 are Natalie, and then the rest are Sarah. But over the overall film, Natalie did a lot more than that. I mean, she did most of the other shots. It was sometimes hard for me to tell the difference as the editor, it was so close." Lane further reiterated the point that prior to the Oscar ceremony, she gave an interview with Glamour for an article titled The Real Black Swan. After this interview, a Black Swan producer contacted her: "He asked if I would please not do any more interviews until after the Oscars because it was bad for Natalie's image ... They were trying to create this image, this facade, really, that Natalie had done something extraordinary. Something that is pretty much impossible ... to become a professional ballerina in a year and half." Lane also emphasized that her criticism was not directed at Portman's acting: "I think she is a really beautiful actress ... I loved working with her. And she was really focused on her character every day. I definitely think she deserves all the credit that she got with the Oscar."

=== Dance Channel TV Network interview ===
In another interview for the Dance Channel network, Lane was asked, "Looking back and having experienced what you had and deciding to talk about what happened, would you do Black Swan again?" Her answer was, "Yeah, I would."
