= Alan Howard (dancer) =

American ballet dancer, choreographer and teacher

- Born: August 7, 1931; Chicago, Illinois, US
- Died: March 6, 2003 (aged 71); Chicago, Illinois, US
- Occupations: Ballet dancer, choreographer, teacher

Alan Howard (1931–2003) was an American ballet dancer, choreographer and teacher. He was a lead dancer for the Ballet Russe de Monte Carlo.

== Biography ==
=== Early life ===
Alan Howard was born in 1931 in Chicago, Illinois. He learned ballet from Edna McRae.

=== Career ===
He became a dancer for the Ballet Russe de Monte Carlo in 1949, soon becoming lead dancer, or premier danseur. He left the company in 1960. He was later a dancer for the Mia Slavenska Ballet, the New York City Ballet, and the Radio City Music Hall.

He established the Pacific Ballet Academy in San Francisco, California. He choreographed and produced the Pacific Ballet. He also taught ballet. For example, Kyra Nichols, a lead dancer at the New York City Ballet, was one of his students.

In 2005, he appeared in the documentary, Ballets Russes.

=== Death ===
He died of cancer on March 6, 2003, in Chicago.
