= Octet (Martins) =

Octet is a ballet made by New York City Ballet balletmaster in chief Peter Martins to Mendelssohn's Octet in E-flat major (1825). The premiere took place November 14, 2003 at the Royal Danish Ballet, Copenhagen; the NYCB premiere was November 23, 2004, at the New York State Theater, Lincoln Center.

== Original casts ==
=== Royal Danish Ballet ===
- Silja Schandorff
- Yao Wei
- Andrew Bowman
- Kristoffer Sakurai

=== NYCB ===
- Ashley Bouder
- Darci Kistler
- Benjamin Millepied
- Stephen Hanna

== Reviews ==
- NY Times, Anna Kisselgoff, November 25, 2004

== Articles ==
- NY Times, Rebecca Milzoff, August 20, 2006
