= Wendy Perron =

American dancer, choreographer, and teacher

- Occupations: Dancer, choreographer, journalist
- Writing career
- Notable works: former editor-in-chief of Dance Magazine, author of Through the Eyes of a Dancer, Selected Writings

Wendy Perron is an American dancer/choreographer, educator, and curator who was the editor-in-chief of Dance Magazine from 2004 to 2013. She is the author of Through the Eyes of a Dancer, Selected Writings(2013), and The Grand Union: Accidental Anarchists of Downtown Dance, 1979–1976, (2020) both published by Wesleyan University Press.

== Biography ==
Perron graduated from Bennington College in 1969. She began her career in New York as a freelance dancer/choreographer at Dance Theater Workshop. She danced with the Trisha Brown Dance Company (1975–78) and participated in one of Twyla Tharp's "farm clubs." Perron later noted: "From Trisha and Twyla, I learned you can use any kind of strange, jagged, weird movements and make a piece flow."

Perron has taught dance at Bennington College, Princeton University, NYU, Rutgers, and City College of New York . She also led the Wendy Perron Dance Company from 1983 to 1994 and was a Senior Fellow of The Vera List Center for Art and Politics at The New School. From 1992 to 1994 she was associate director of Jacob's Pillow Dance Festival. She earned a master's degree from Empire State College in 2001. Her graduate thesis, "Imagining Justice: Artists Working for Social Change," completed in 2001, is now posted in the Empire Digital Repository.

Perron has written for The New York Times, The Village Voice, Ballet Review, and the Dance Research Journal. She joined the editorial staff of Dance Magazine in 2000 and became its editor-in-chief in 2004. In 2013 she became editor-at-large. She hosted a series of 37 video previews called “What Wendy’s Watching,” for Dance Magazine from 2017 to 2019.

In addition to serving as editor at large for Dance Magazine, she also writes for Tanz, International Edition, and The Dance Enthusiast. She's also contributed essays to several catalogs, including Radical Bodies.

In April 2011, she was one of three artists inducted into New York Foundation for the Arts' inaugural Hall of Fame.

Perron co-choreographed The Daily Mirror: 1976–2022 with Morgan Griffin. The two performed it at the La MaMa Moves Festival in 2023. In 2024 Perron made a new solo for Tictac Art Center, a hub of improvisation in Brussels, which she wrote about here in The Dance Enthusiast.

In 2025, Perron curated "Connecting Through Time: 50 Season with Norton Owen" at Jacob's Pillow. She is quoted in The New York Times and The Observer for her work.

In 2017 she co-curated Radical Bodies: Anna Halprin, Simone Forti and Yvonne Rainer in California and New York, 1955–1973. She co-wrote and co-edited the book of the same title. She taught a graduate seminar at NYU's Tisch School of the Arts from 2001 to 2014 and currently teaches dance history at Juilliard.

In advance of her book on Grand Union, Perron wrote this article for walkerart.org. She was also interviewed by The New York Times for her book on the Grand Union.

Perron posts a series of Unsung Heroes of Dance History on her website at wendyperron.com.

== See also ==
- Black Swan dance double controversy
