= Variations: Aldous Huxley in memoriam =

1964 orchestral composition by Igor Stravinsky

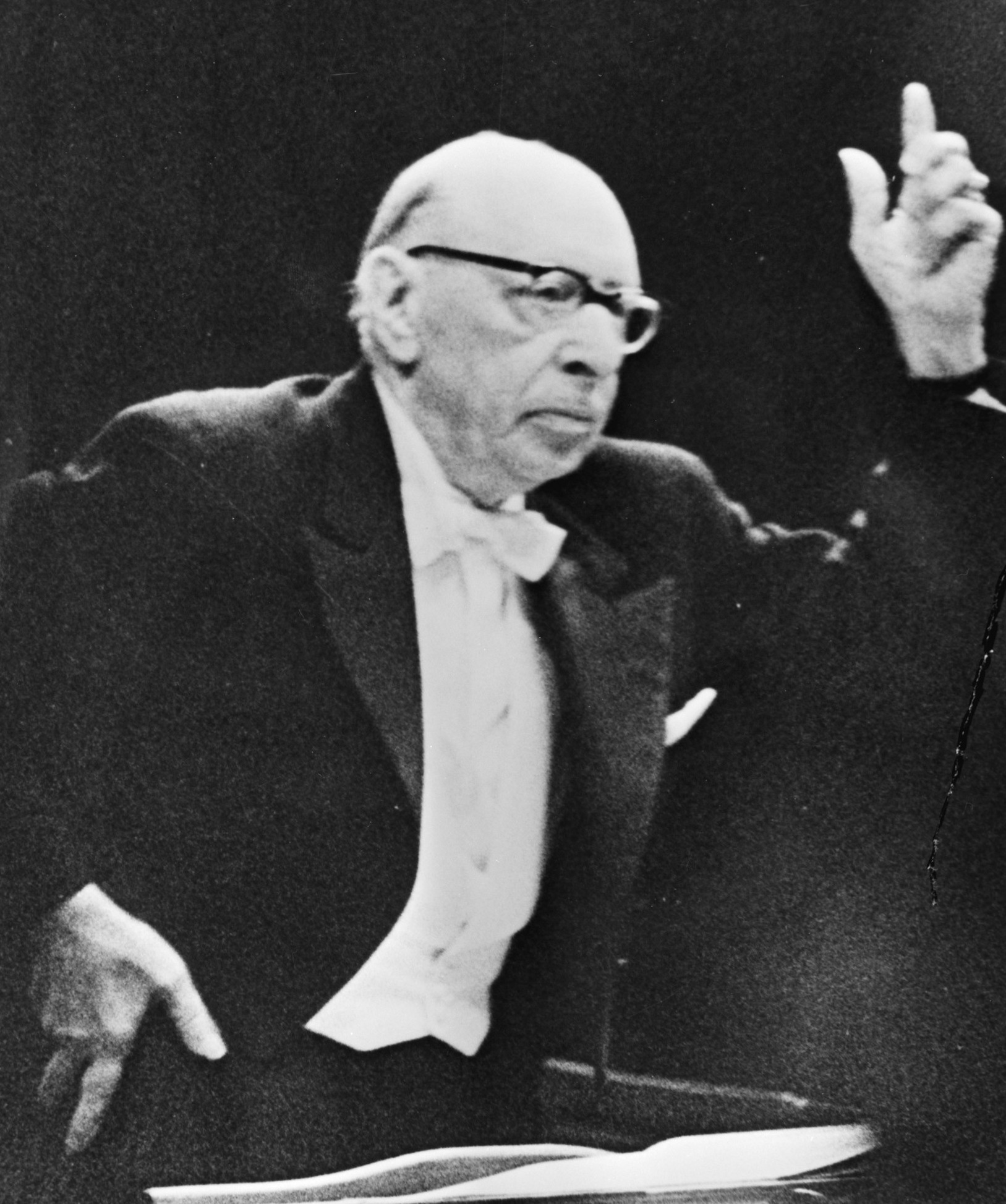
Igor Stravinsky conducting in 1965

Variations: Aldous Huxley in memoriam is Igor Stravinsky's last major orchestral composition, written in 1963–64.

== History ==
Stravinsky began work on the Variations in Santa Fe, New Mexico, in July 1963, and completed the composition in Hollywood, California, on 28 October 1964. It was first performed in Chicago on 17 April 1965, by the Chicago Symphony Orchestra conducted by Robert Craft. The score is dedicated to the memory of Stravinsky's close friend Aldous Huxley, who died on 22 November 1963 (the same day that President John F. Kennedy was assassinated), when composition of the Variations was in progress.

Although not composed for the purpose, Stravinsky's music was twice choreographed for the New York City Ballet by George Balanchine, a first version in 1966, and a second version in 1982, both times under the title Variations.

== Analysis ==
The Variations are based on a twelve-note row:

D C A B E A♯ G♯ C♯ D♯ G F♯ F

Opinions about the form differ. According to one view, the work consists of twelve variations: bars 1–22, 23–33, 33–39, 40–46, 47–58, 59–72, 73–85, 86–94, 95–100, 101–117, 118–129, and 130–141. According to another, bars 33/34–46 comprise a single variation, Var. 3, so there are only eleven in all, ranging from 6 to 22 bars in length, some of which are subdivided into two or three component sections. According to yet another, a prelude and postlude frame three main sections, the first two separated by a short episode, and the second and third by a more extended section divided into five episodes. There is no "theme" on whose melodic, rhythmic, or formal characteristics the variations are constructed, nor are there any conventional compositional variation techniques.

The central feature of the Variations is a duodecet, or twelve-part invention, which is divided into three parts, separated by contrasting episodes and each with a different scoring: twelve solo violins, ten solo violas with two double basses, and twelve winds (two flutes, alto flute, the oboes, cor anglais, two clarinets, bass clarinet, two bassoons, and horn). Metrically, this invention uses a regularly recurring succession of 4/8 + 3/8 + 5/8 bars, with each of the three large sections containing four of these three-bar units.

== Instrumentation ==
- 2 flutes
- alto flute
- 2 oboes
- cor anglais
- 2 clarinets
- bass clarinet
- 2 bassoons
- 4 horns
- 3 trumpets
- 2 tenor trombones
- bass trombone
- harp
- piano
- 12 violins
- 10 violas
- 8 cellos
- 4 double basses
