= Natalia Makarova =

Soviet and American ballet dancer

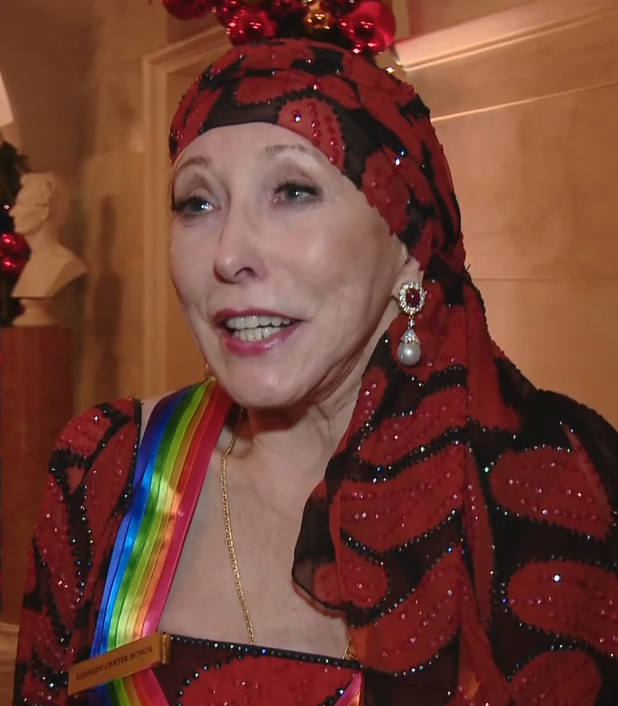
- Makarova at the 2012 Kennedy Center Honors
- Born: Natalia Romanovna Makarova; 21 November 1940 (age 85); Leningrad, Russian SFSR, Soviet Union (now Saint Petersburg, Russia)
- Other name: Natasha Makarova
- Occupations: Ballet dancer, choreographer
- Years active: 1950s–present
- Spouse: Edward Karkar (m. 1976; died 2013)

Natalia Romanovna Makarova (Russian: Ната́лия Рома́новна Мака́рова, born 21 November 1940) is a Russian prima ballerina and choreographer. The History of Dance, published in 1981, notes that "her performances set standards of artistry and aristocracy of dance which mark her as the finest ballerina of her generation in the West."

== Biography ==
Makarova was born in Leningrad in the Russian SFSR of the Soviet Union. At the age of 12, she auditioned for the Leningrad Choreographic School (formerly the Imperial Ballet School), and was accepted although most students join the school at the age of nine.

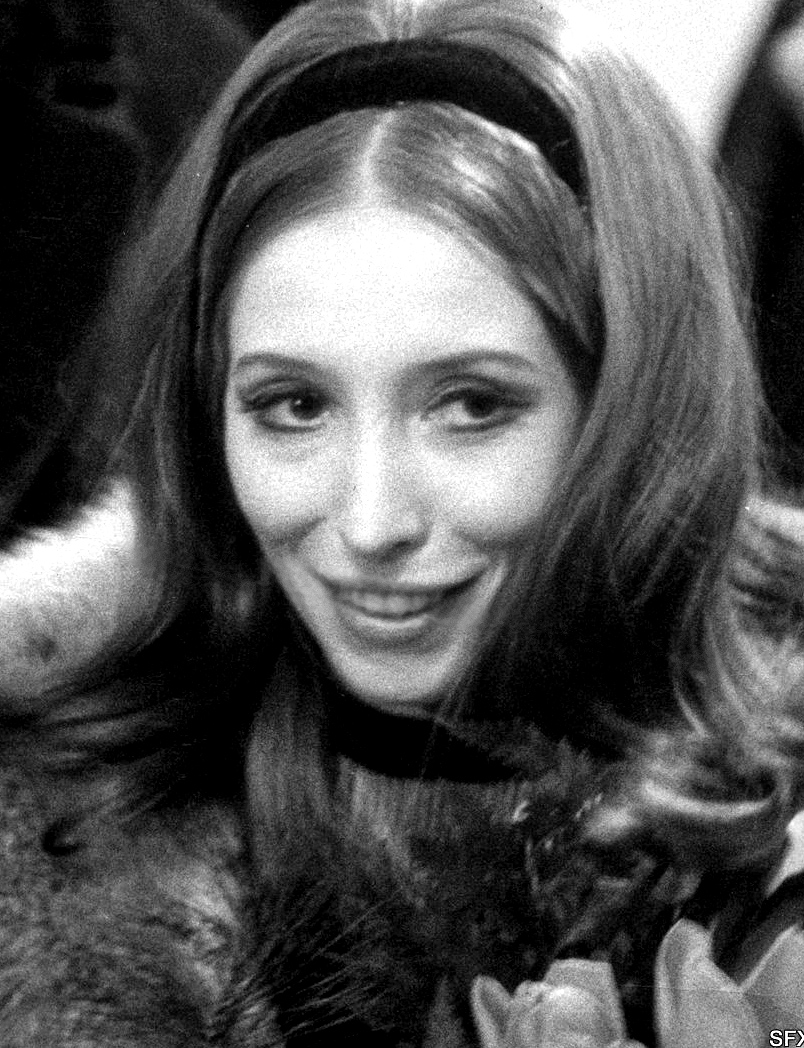
Makarova in 1971

Makarova was a permanent member of the Kirov Ballet in Leningrad from 1956 to 1970, achieving prima ballerina status during the 1960s. She defected to the West on 4 September 1970, while on tour with the Kirov Ballet in London. Soon after defecting, Makarova began performing with the American Ballet Theatre in New York City and the Royal Ballet in London.

When she first arrived in the West, Makarova was eager to expand her choreography by dancing ballets by modern choreographers. At the same time, she remained most identified with classical roles such as Odette/Odile in Swan Lake and Giselle. In December 1975, she and her dance partner Mikhail Baryshnikov featured prominently in an episode of the BBC television series Arena. She was featured in the 1976 live American Ballet Theatre production of Swan Lake, simulcast from Lincoln Center on both PBS and NPR. When ABT artistic director Lucia Chase stepped down, both Makarova and Baryshnikov applied. After the company went with Baryshnikov, she left for the Royal Ballet of London.

Makarova continued to excel in many different roles, most notably, her title role in Giselle. In 1989, she returned to her home theatre of the Kirov Ballet and was reunited with her family and with former colleagues and teachers. Her emotional homecoming was documented in the film Makarova Returns, which she wrote as well as presented. After her performance at the Kirov, she retired from dancing, donating her shoes and costumes to the Kirov Museum. Today Makarova stages ballets such as Swan Lake, La Bayadère and Sleeping Beauty for companies across the world. She retired from dancing due to accumulating injuries, especially to her knees.

Makarova won a Tony Award, as well as numerous other stage awards for her performances in the Broadway revival of On Your Toes. She played Lydia Lopokova (Lady Keynes) in Wooing in Absence, compiled by Patrick Garland. It was first performed at Charleston Farmhouse and then at the Tate Britain.

== Personal life ==
Makarova has been married three times. Once to another ballet dancer and once to director Leonid Kvinikhidze. In 1976, Makarova married industrialist Edward Karkar, and together they had a son, Andrei. Karkar died 22 December 2013, at the age of 81. Janet Sassoon said about Makarova,

When I began teaching in San Francisco, through Madam Bali, I got to work with all these great Russian first dancers when they were there. So I got Natalia (Natasha) Makarova, a Prima Ballerina Assoluta. There was only one Prima Ballerina Assoluta up until the time she danced. And here I had her in my hands for five months after the birth of her child!

== Awards ==
- 1965 – Varna International Ballet Competition – Gold Medal
- 1969 – Honored Artist of the RSFSR
- 1970 – Anna Pavlova Prize & Critic's Award, Paris
- 1977 – Dance Magazine Award
- 1979 – Mother of the Year Award
- 1980 – A Dance Autobiography, Knopf Publishers, 1979. – Certificate of Excellence – American Institute of Graphic Arts – Selected for Exhibition
- 1983 – Tony Award for Best Actress in a Musical – On Your Toes (Broadway)
- 1983 – Drama Desk Award for Outstanding Actress in a Musical – On Your Toes (Broadway)
- 1983 – Theatre World Award – On Your Toes (Broadway)
- 1983 – Astaire Award – On Your Toes (Broadway)
- 1983 – Outer Critics Circle Award – On Your Toes (Broadway)
- 1983 – Stanislavsky Award – On Your Toes (Broadway)
- 1984 – Laurence Olivier Award for Best Actress in a Musical – On Your Toes, London
- 1985 – London Evening Standard Award – for the Best Performance of 1985 in the ballet Onegin. Presented on stage by Princess Diana after Makarova's performance of Onegin in 1986, London
- 1986 – Emmy Award nomination for Ballerina, a four-part documentary TV series, which was conceived, written and narrated by Makarova, BBC London/WNET
- 1991/92 – American Library Association Award – for Makarova's recordings of the stories Snow Maiden, The Frog Princess & Firebird – Delos Records
- 1993 – Distinguished Artist Award – Los Angeles
- 2000 – Artistic Achievement Award – Mexico
- 2004 – Artistic Achievement Award from the School of American Ballet
- 2012 – Kennedy Center Honor
- 2014 – "Soul of Dance" by the Russian Ballet Journal and the Russian Ministry of Culture
- 2018 – Life Achievement Award by Jury of the Benois de la Danse

== Work ==
=== Repertoire ===
As Permanent Guest Artist with American Ballet Theatre and the Royal Ballet, her repertoire included:

- American Ballet Theatre: Lilac Garden; Dark Elegies; Pillar of Fire; Theme & Variations_{;} Apollo; La Bayadère; Kingdom of the Shades; Coppelia; Voluntaries; La fille mal gardée; La Sylphide; Don Quixote; Nutcracker; Raymonda Act 3; Contredances; Le Sacre du printemps (choreographed by Glen Tetley); Firebird; Concerto; Giselle; Swan Lake; Romeo and Juliet (MacMillan); Sleeping Beauty, Les Sylphides, Other Dances; Epilogue; Miraculous Mandarin; Pas de Quatre; The River; Études; Romeo & Juliet Pas de Deux (Tchernishov); Desir; Wild Boy.
- Royal Ballet: - Manon; Song of the Earth; A Month in the Country; Concerto; Cinderella; Voluntaries; Dances at a Gathering; Serenade; Elite Syncopations; Concerto; Checkmate; Les Biches; Kenneth MacMillan's Romeo and Juliet; Swan Lake, Giselle, The Sleeping Beauty, Les Sylphides, Van Manen's Adagio Hammerklavier; MacMillan's Pas de Deux and Ashton's Dream Pas de Deux.
- As Guest Artist with ballet companies throughout the world her repertoire included: the classical repertoire (Giselle, Swan Lake, Les Sylphides, La Sylphide) as well as Onegin (choreographed by John Cranko); Notre Dame de Paris, Carmen, Proust, Le Jeune Homme et la Mort (choreographed by Roland Petit); Romeo and Juliet (Cranko), Swan Lake (Cranko), John Neumeier's Illusions - Like Swan Lake 2nd Act, Bach Sonata (choreographed by Maurice Bejart); Nutcracker (Neumeier); Romeo andJuliet (full-length version Tchernishov); Le Rossignol (Ashton); Rosalinda (Hynd); Tchaikovsky Pas de Deux (choreographed by George Balanchine); Apparitions (Ashton); Afternoon of a Faun (chorographed by Jerome Robbins); Meditation (Haigen) The Real McCoy (Feld) The Lesson (Flindt), The Toreador (Bourneville); Dying Swan; Corsaire Pas de Deux, Don Quixote Pas de Deux.

=== Original productions staged and directed by Makarova ===
- 1974 – Kingdom of the Shades – American Ballet Theatre
- 1980 – La Bayadère – American Ballet Theatre
- 1983 – Paquita – American Ballet Theatre
- 1984 – Kingdom of the Shades – National Ballet of Canada
- 1985 – Kingdom of the Shades – London Festival Ballet
- 1986 – Kingdom of the Shades – Teatro Municipal – Rio de Janeiro, Brasil
- 1988 – Swan Lake – London Festival Ballet
- 1989 – La Bayadère – Royal Swedish Ballet
- 1989 – La Bayadère – Royal Ballet – Covent Garden – London
- 1991 – Paquita – National Ballet of Canada
- 1991 – Paquita – Universal Ballet Company of Seoul, Korea
- 1992 – La Bayadère – La Scala Ballet
- 1992 – La Bayadère – Teatro Colón, Argentina
- 1997 – La Bayadère – Finnish National Ballet
- 1997 – La Bayadère – Ballet de Santiago, Chile
- 1998 – La Bayadère – Australian Ballet
- 2000 – Kingdom of the Shades – San Francisco Ballet
- 2000 – Giselle – Royal Swedish Ballet
- 2000 – La Bayadère – Teatro Municipal, Rio de Janeiro
- 2001 – Swan Lake – Teatro Municipal, Rio de Janeiro
- 2002 – La Bayadère – Hamburg Ballet
- 2003 – Sleeping Beauty – Royal Ballet – Covent Garden – London
- 2002 – Paquita – San Francisco Ballet
- 2004 – La Bayadère – Theatr Wieki Opera Narodowa, Warsaw, Poland
- 2005 – Swan Lake – Perm Ballet Russia
- 2007 – La Bayadère – Dutch National Ballet
- 2007 – Swan Lake – National Ballet of China
- 2008 – La Bayadère – Corella Ballet, Teatro Real, Madrid
- 2009 – La Bayadère – Tokyo Ballet
- 2013 – La Bayadère – National Ballet of Ukraine, Kyiv
- 2013 – Giselle – Royal Swedish Ballet

=== Documentaries and other ===
- 1970 – BBC-TV – Black Swan Pas de Deux with Rudolf Nureyev & Dying Swan
- 1976 – Swan Lake with Ivan Nagy at the Metropolitan Opera House – Live from Lincoln Center – American Ballet Theatre
- 1976 – Don Quixote Pas de deux & Giselle Act 2 (Partner Baryshnikov) BBC TV London
- 1977 – Giselle with Mikhail Baryshnikov at the Metropolitan Opera House – Live from Lincoln Center – American Ballet Theatre
- 1978 – Don Quixote Pas de Deux with Fernando Bujones at the Metropolitan Opera House – Live from Lincoln Center – American Ballet Theatre
- 1978 – Jerome Robbin's Other Dances with Mikhail Baryshnikov – WNET
- 1979 – Assoluta – Natalia Makarova – BBC TV, London
- 1979 – The Magic of Dance
- 1980 – Makarova's production of La Bayadère with Anthony Dowell at the Metropolitan Opera House - Live from Lincoln Center – American Ballet Theatre
- 1980 – Swan Lake with Anthony Dowell – Royal Ballet, Thames TV, London
- 1981 – The President's Command Performance – The Inaugural Gala Performance for President Elect Ronald Reagan, Kennedy Center, Washington, DC
- 1983 – Stars Salute the President – Ford Theatre, Washington, DC (for President Reagan)
- 1984 – Gala of the Stars– Proust (Petit) with Richard Cragun & Begin the Beguine (Gennaro) with Cryst, WNET, Radio City, New York
- 1985 – Natasha – Natalia Makarova – National Video Corporation/Kultur USA
- 1985 – American Ballet Theatre in San Francisco – National Video Corp.
- 1985 – In a Class of Her Own – Natalia Makarova – THAMES TV – London
- 1985 – American Ballet Theatre at the Met – Makarova's PAQUITA filmed at the Metropolitan Opera House, New York
- 1986 – Ballerina – four-part series for BBC TV
- 1988 – The First International Erik Bruhn Competition – Guest Appearance by Natalia Makarova
- 1988 – Reunion with the Kirov Ballet - White Swan with Zaklinsky – BBC London live broadcast
- 1988 – Romeo & Juliet (MacMillan) with Kevin Mckenzie at the Metropolitan Opera House – Live from Lincoln Center – American Ballet Theatre
- 1989 – Makarova Returns – BBC-TV, London/Kultur, USA
- 1989 – Leningrad Legend – BBC-TV Omnibus, London/ Kultur USA
- 1989 – Swan Lake – Makarova's production for the London Festival Ballet
- 1991 – La Bayadère – Makarova's production for the Royal Ballet – from Covent Garden – Cameras Continentales, Amaya & Thames
- 1991 – A Portrait of Giselle
- 1994 – BBC Great Railway Journeys – St. Petersburg to Tashkent – written and presented by Makarova
- 2007 – La Bayadère – Makarova's production for La Scala Ballet, Milan
- 2009 – La Bayadère – Makarova's production for the Royal Ballet, Covent Garden, London
- 2011 – Natalia Makarova Two Lives – Russian documentary

== See also ==
- List of dancers
- List of Russian ballet dancers
- List of Eastern Bloc defectors
