= Gershwin Piano Concerto =

Ballet by Jerome Robbins

The Gershwin Piano Concerto is a ballet made on New York City Ballet by its ballet master Jerome Robbins to George Gershwin's 1925 Concerto in F. The premiere took place on February 4, 1982 at the New York State Theater, Lincoln Center in New York. A reviewer for The New York Times commented that "Certainly, The Gershwin Concerto was a smashing success" and that Robbins was "a brilliant choreographer at his most complex, working on a startling level of formal ingenuity and also retaining his singular genius for capturing the essence of a national spirit."

== Original cast ==
- Maria Calegari
- Darci Kistler

- Christopher d'Amboise
- Mel Tomlinson
