= Variations for Orchestra (Balanchine) =

Variations for Orchestra is the last ballet made by New York City Ballet co-founder and founding choreographer George Balanchine to Igor Stravinsky's Variations: Aldous Huxley in memoriam (1963–64). The premiere took place on Friday, 2 July 1982 at the New York State Theater, Lincoln Center.

== Original cast ==
- Suzanne Farrell

== Reviews ==
- NY Times review by Jack Anderson, 4 July 1982
