= Friandises =

Ballet by Christopher Rouse

Friandises is a ballet in five movements written by the American composer Christopher Rouse and originally choreographed by Peter Martins. The score was jointly commissioned by the New York City Ballet and the Juilliard School and was completed in September 2005. It was first performed by the New York City Ballet February 10, 2006 at the New York State Theater in Lincoln Center, New York City. The title of the piece loosely translates in the French language to "bits" or "morsels".

== Composition ==
=== Structure ===
Friandises has a duration of roughly 25 minutes and is composed in five movements in the style of a Baroque suite:

1. Intrada
2. Sicilienne
3. Passepied
4. Sarabande
5. Galop

=== Instrumentation ===
The work is scored for an orchestra comprising two flutes (2nd doubling piccolo), two oboes, two clarinets (2nd doubling bass clarinet), two bassoons, four French horns, two trumpets, three trombones, tuba, timpani, percussion, harp, and strings.

== Reception ==
Reviewing the world premiere, Jennifer Dunning of The New York Times called the piece "big and orchestral, with lots of shimmering strings, gleaming brass and thudding kettle drums." Referring to its title, Joel Lobenthal of The New York Sun remarked that "the score serves up one glancing musical allusion after another." Music critic Anne Midgette compared parts of the music to Gustav Mahler's Adagietto and called it "loud, brash and invigorating."
