= Delight of the Muses =

Delight of the Muses is a ballet made by New York City Ballet's ballet master in chief Peter Martins to eponymous music by Charles Wuorinen, commissioned by City Ballet as part of its commemoration of the bicentennial of the death of Wolfgang Amadeus Mozart. The composer has taken fragments of Mozart piano sonatas K.231 and K. 283 and music from Don Giovanni for this tribute to Mozart. The premiere took place on 29 January 1992 at the New York State Theater, Lincoln Center.

== Cast ==
=== Original ===
- Darci Kistler
- Jock Soto
- Nilas Martins

== Reviews ==
- Kisselgoff, Anna (January 31, 1992). "Review/City Ballet; A Premiere Having Fun With Mozart". The New York Times.
- NY Times review by Jennifer Dunning, February 15, 1993
- NY Times article by Allan Kozinn, January 3, 1996
