= Heléne Alexopoulos =

American ballet dancer

- Born: Chicago, Illinois, U.S.
- Education: School of American Ballet; Columbia University
- Occupation: ballet dancer
- Years active: 1978–2002
- Spouse: Lance Warrick (m. 1985)
- Children: 2
- Career
- Former groups: New York City Ballet

Heléne Alexopoulos is an American retired ballet dancer. She was a student of Maria Tallchief who was discovered by George Balanchine as a teenager. She joined the New York City Ballet in 1978, she was promoted to principal dancer in 1989, and she retired in 2002.

== Early life and training ==
Alexopoulos was born in Chicago to Greek parents, and was raised in Oak Park, Illinois. She attended Oak Park and River Forest High School. She started ballet at age six, and at age fourteen, she started training with Maria Tallchief, and performed with Tallchief's company, Chicago Lyric Opera Ballet. In 1975, a teenage Alexopoulos was chosen by George Balanchine to perform the role of a child with the New York City Ballet. She then moved to New York to train at the School of American Ballet for a year.

== Career ==
Alexopoulos joined the New York City Ballet in 1978. In her first year, she was cast as the Arabian dancer in Balanchine's The Nutcracker, but was also tasked to learn the role of Dewdrop, a challenging principal role. While she was working on the role, Balanchine provided some corrections. She was promoted to soloist in 1984, a year after Balanchine died, and principal dancer in 1989. Ballets she was known for include Balanchine's Prodigal Son, Vienna Waltzes, "Emerald" in Jewels, Episodes, Monumentum pro Gesualdo, Movements for Piano and Orchestra, Divertimento No. 15, Variations pour une Porte et un Soupir and The Nutcracker, as well as Robbins' I'm Old Fashioned, Antique Epigraphs and West Side Story Suite, and sang on stage for the latter. She retired from the New York City Ballet in 2002. In her final performance, she danced Prodigal Son and Vienna Waltzes.

== Personal life ==
Alexopoulos was accepted by Harvard University on a scholarship, but she decided to pursue a career in ballet, despite her family's disapproval. She would later attend Columbia University.

In 1985, Alexopoulos married Lance Warrick, an insurance lawyer. Their twins, a son and a daughter, were born in 1994. She was one of the few dancers in New York City Ballet, male or female, who had children and the only woman to have more than one.
