= River of Light =

River of Light is a ballet made by New York City Ballet balletmaster in chief Peter Martins to eponymous music by Charles Wuorinen commissioned in honor of his sixtieth birthday. The premiere took place June 11, 1998, at the New York State Theater, Lincoln Center, with costumes by Holly Hynes and lighting by Mark Stanley; the 2008 revival was conducted by the composer and held in honor of his seventieth birthday. The River of Light was the third work in a trio of scores the New York City Ballet commissioned from Wuorinen in the early 1990s, the others being The Mission of Virgil and The Great Procession. All three works refer to scenes in Dante's Divine Comedy.

== Original cast ==
- Darci Kistler
- Monique Meunier
- Alexandra Ansanelli
- Jock Soto
- Charles Askegard
- Sébastien Marcovici

== Reviews ==
- NY Times review by Alastair Macaulay, May 31, 2008
- Kisselgoff, Anna (June 18, 1999). "The Divergent Progeny of Granddaddy Ives". The New York Times.
- NY Times review by Jennifer Dunning, June 13, 1998
