= Symphony No. 1 (ballet) =

Symphony No. 1 is a ballet made by New York City Ballet ballet master (subsequently ballet master in chief) Peter Martins to Tschaikovsky's Symphony No. 1 in G minor, Op. 13, Winter Dreams (1866–74). The premiere took place 6 June 1981, as part of City Ballet's Tschaikovsky Festival at the New York State Theater, Lincoln Center.

== Original cast ==
- Darci Kistler
- Lisa Hess
- Lourdes Lopez
- Sean Lavery
- Afshin Mofid
- Kipling Houston
