= Jorja Fleezanis =

American violinist (1952–2022)

Jorja Kay Fleezanis (March 19, 1952 – September 9, 2022) was an American violinist and the Henry A. Upper Chair at Indiana University.

Fleezanis grew up in Detroit, Michigan, the daughter of Greek immigrants. A graduate of Cass Technical High School, she studied at the Cleveland Institute of Music and the Cincinnati Conservatory and later won a position in the Chicago Symphony. Fleezanis was concertmaster of the Minnesota Orchestra from 1989 to 2009—the longest-tenured concertmaster in the orchestra's history and only the second woman in the U.S. to hold the title of concertmaster in a major orchestra when appointed. Prior to Minnesota, she was associate concertmaster with the San Francisco Symphony for eight years. In 1994, she premiered John Adams' Violin Concerto—a work commissioned for her by the Minnesota Orchestra—with then-music director Edo de Waart leading the orchestra.

Fleezanis became an adjunct faculty member at the University of Minnesota's School of Music in 1990. She also maintained teaching roles with other organizations as teacher and artist at the Music Academy of the West (2013–2022); Round Top Festival Institute in Texas (1990–2007); artist in residence at the University of California, Davis; guest artist and teacher at the San Francisco Conservatory, where she served on the faculty from 1981 to 1989; artist and mentor at the Music@Menlo Festival (2003–2008); teacher and coach at the New World Symphony (1988–2017) and a visiting teacher to the Boston Conservatory, the Juilliard School, and Interlochen Academy and Summer Camp.

Fleezanis also established the Michael Steinberg and Jorja Fleezanis Fund in memory of her husband. The fund commissioned chamber works that combined music with written texts; its third commission, a work by Jessica Meyer based on a poem by Rumi, was premiered in May 2022.

Fleezanis was married to the music critic Michael Steinberg since 1983 till his death in 2009. She died on September 9, 2022, at the age of 70.
