= Lise la Cour =

Danish ballerina, choreographer and dance teacher (1944–2016)

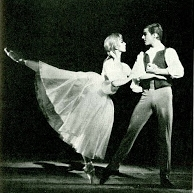
Lise la Cour and Peter Martins in Stemninger (1963)

Lise la Cour (21 August 1944 – 13 August 2016) was a Danish ballerina, choreographer and dance teacher. After training at the company's ballet school, she premièred at the Royal Danish Ballet in 1961 and went on to star in a series of ballets including Bournonville's Napoli, Balanchine's The Four Temperaments and Flemming Flindt's The Young Man Must Marry. From the late 1970s, she was principally a choreographer, creating ballets based on the fairy tales of Hans Christian Andersen's, starting with Hyrdinden og skorstensfejeren (The Shepherdess and the Chimney Sweep) in 1988. She was Viceballetmester (Associate artistic director) of the Royal Danish Ballet from 1988 to 1995 and was involved in several large theatre productions in the following years until she was appointed administrative director of the Royal Danish Opera from 1999 to 2001, ensuring a smooth transition between the former opera director Elaine Padmore and newcomer Kasper Holten. In 2002, she moved to San Jose, California, where she was appointed school director of the Ballet San Jose until she established her own school, Lise la Cour's LaCademy of Ballet, in 2012.

== Biography ==
Born on 21 August 1944 in Copenhagen, Lise la Cour was the daughter of Mogens la Cour (1905–1991) and Elga Gurli Nielsen (born 1911). When she was nine, she entered the Royal Danish Ballet School where she received support from Børge Ralov (1908–1981). In 1961, she made her début as Anne Frank in Kenneth MacMillan's The Burrow, after which she performed a series of significant roles, including the young girl in Léonide Massine's Le beau Danube (1962), the pas de six in Napoli (1963) and Balanchine's The Four Temperaments (1963).

She went on to partner her husband-to-be Peter Martins in Hans Brenaa's Stemninger (1964). They married in December 1965 and had one child together: Nilas Christian (1967). She played Elisa in Bournonville's Le Conservatoire (1965) and performed in Flemming Flindt's The Young Man Must Marry (1967). In the late 1970s, she turned to choreography with Daniel Bohr's Kurt Weill Cabaret (1978). The first of her own works was the western ballet Gry (1982). Six years later, in collaboration with the composer Bent Fabricius-Bjerre and the artist and scenographer Bjørn Wiinblad she developed the choreography for various fairy tales by Hans Christian Andersen, starting with The Shepherdess and the Chimney Sweeper (1888). It was followed by Den Grimme Ælling (The Ugly Duckling, 1989), Klods Hans (Blockhead Hans, 1990), Den Lille Havfrue (The Little Mermaid, 1992) and Fyrtøjet (The Tinderbox, 1995).

In 1988, she accepted Frank Andersen's invitation to become Deputy Artistic Director of the Royal Danish Ballet. In 1999, she was appointed Director of the Royal Danish Opera, a post she held until 2001. She also chaired Ballettens Private Pensionskasse, contributing to the funding of retirement pensions for elderly dancers.

In 2002, she moved to San Jose, California, where she was appointed school director of the Ballet San Jose until she established her own school, Lise la Cour's LaCademy of Ballet, in 2012. She died in San Jose on 13 August 2016.

== Personal life ==
La Cour was divorced from Peter Martins in 1969. In 1981, she married the conductor Frans Henrik Rasmussen, but divorce in 1994. They had two children together: Ask (1982) and Mikkel (1984). In 1998, she married the singer Bengt Göran Torsten Bjernhager, who died in 2009. Her fourth and last husband was Roger Lyness of San Jose who survived her. Her son Ask la Cour was a principal dancer with the New York City Ballet.

== Awards ==
In 1989, la Cour was honored as a Knight of the Order of the Dannebrog.
