= Kyra Nichols =

American ballet dancer

- Born: July 2, 1958 (age 66); Berkeley, California, U.S.
- Education: School of American Ballet
- Occupations: ballet dancer; teacher
- Spouse: David Gray
- Children: 2
- Career
- Former groups: New York City Ballet

Kyra Nichols (born July 2, 1958) is an American retired ballet dancer and teacher. She joined the New York City Ballet in 1974 and was promoted to principal dancer in 1979. She is one of the last dancers to have worked with George Balanchine, although he did not create any new work on her. However, she originated roles in several ballets by Jerome Robbins. Nichols retired from performing in 2007, after a 33-year career.

Nichols joined the Pennsylvania Ballet as a ballet mistress in the 2014–15 season. In 2017, she left to serve as Violette Verdy and Kathy Ziliak Anderson Chair in Ballet and professor of music in ballet at the Indiana University Jacobs School of Music.

== Early life and training ==
Kyra Nichols was born on July 2, 1958, in Berkeley, California. She received her dance training from her mother, Sally Streets, who danced with the New York City Ballet in the 1950s. She was also taught by Alan Howard, a former member of Ballet Russe de Monte-Carlo and New York City Ballet. Starting at age twelve, she attended summer intensives at the School of American Ballet in New York. After the third summer, she was asked to stay as a full-time student.

== Career ==
Nichols became an apprentice with the New York City Ballet in 1974, shortly before she turned 16. She was hired as a full company member later that year. In her early career, she was not noticed by choreographer George Balanchine, instead she was mentored by principal dancer Jacques D'Amboise, who also cast her in works he choreographed. Balanchine eventually spotted her and cast her as the principal in the Fourth Movement of Symphony in C. Nichols was promoted to soloist in 1978 and principal dancer the following year.

Nichols worked closely with Balanchine. In 1980, he revised his version of The Firebird on her. Balanchine once called her exactness of execution "God-given." However, he did not make any new ballet on her. Balanchine died in 1983, therefore Nichols became one of the last dancers to have worked with him. The various ballets by Balanchine she was known for include Serenade, The Nutcracker, Liebeslieder Walzer, Kammermusik No. 2, Divertimento No. 15, Robert Schumann's Davidsbündlertänze and La Sonnambula.

Nichols had created several roles for Jerome Robbins, starting with the 1978 Verdi Variations, which would become "Spring" in The Four Seasons. Other notable Robbins ballet she originated roles in include Piano Pieces, I'm Old Fashioned, Antique Epigraphs and Rondo. She had also worked with choreographers Peter Martins, Susan Stroman, Twyla Tharp and William Forsythe.

Towards the end of her dance career, she was allowed to choose what to dance, and her workload was reduced. Following an unusually long 33-year career, Nichols retired from the New York City Ballet in 2007, shortly before she turned 49. In her farewell performance, she danced Serenade as the Waltz Girl, Robert Schumann's Davidsbündlertänze and "Der Rosenkavalier" from Vienna Waltzes, all three were choreographed by Balanchine.

Nichols started teaching at the Princeton Ballet School whilst an active dancer, and continued to do so after she retired. She joined the Pennsylvania Ballet as a ballet mistress in the 2014–15 season. At the company, she staged Balanchine's Concerto Barocco and Serenade. In 2017, she left to join the faculty of Indiana University Jacobs School of Music as Violette Verdy and Kathy Ziliak Anderson Chair in Ballet and professor of music in ballet, succeeding Violette Verdy, who died the previous year. In 2023, Nichols returned to New York City Ballet for the first time since her retirement to coach three ballets, including Robbins' Rondo, for the company's first performances of the ballet since 1980, as well as Balanchine's Walpurgisnacht Ballet and Donizetti Variations.

== Personal life ==
Nichols is married to David Gray, who worked at the New York City Ballet press office. Gray would later serve as Pennsylvania Ballet's executive director. They have two sons, born in 1996 and 2001 respectively.
