= Dance Suite (Bernstein) =

Last composition completed by Leonard Bernstein

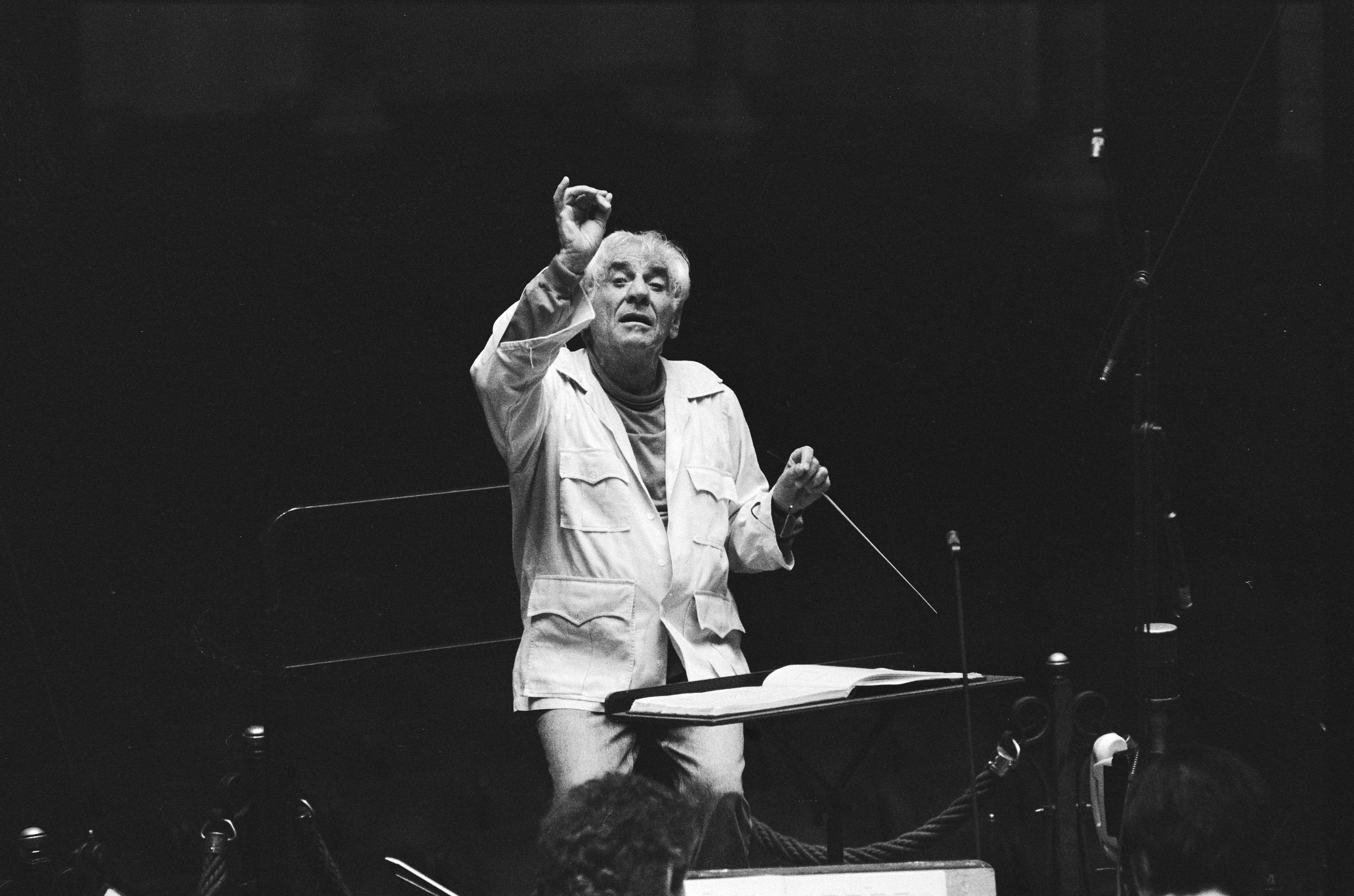
Leonard Bernstein conducting the Concertgebouw Orchestra, 1985

The Dance Suite for Brass Quintet (1989) is the last work completed by the American conductor and composer Leonard Bernstein. It is scored for a brass quintet composed of two trumpets, French horn, trombone, tuba. The suite consists of five short movements, each dedicated to a friend:

1. "Dancisca for Anthony"
2. "Waltz for Agnes"
3. "Bi-Tango for Mischa"
4. "Two-Step for Mr. B"
5. "MTV for Jerry"

The suite was the last composition that Bernstein completed. It was originally intended to be accompanied by dance, but the choreographer abandoned the idea. The suite was premiered on January 14, 1990 at the Metropolitan Opera House, New York City, by the Empire Brass Quintet and American Ballet Theatre. The first movement was doubled by the ballet's orchestra in the pit.

== Sources ==
- Gottlieb, Jack: Working With Bernstein, p. 194-6.
