= Antique Epigraphs =

Antique Epigraphs is a ballet made on New York City Ballet by ballet master Jerome Robbins to an orchestrated version of Debussy's Six épigraphes antiques, L131, for piano, four hands, from 1914:

- “Pour invoquer Pan, dieu du vent d'été”
- “Pour un tombeau sans nom”
- “Pour que la nuit soit propice”
- “Pour la danseuse aux crotales”
- “Pour l'égyptienne”
- “Pour remercier la pluie au matin”

and his Syrinx, L129, a melody for unaccompanied flute from 1913. Six épigraphes antiques were originally written to accompany Pierre Louys' Les Chansons de Bilitis, prose poetry which was purported to be a translation of freshly discovered autobiographical verse by a lover and contemporary of Sappho. The premiere took place on February 2, 1984, at the New York State Theater, Lincoln Center, with costumes by Florence Klotz and lighting by Jennifer Tipton.

== Casts ==
=== Original ===
- Kyra Nichols
- Stephanie Saland
- Helene Alexopoulos
- Victoria Hall
- Maria Calegari
- Simone Schumacher
- Jerri Kumery
- Florence Fitzgerald

== Articles ==
- NY Times by Anna Kisselgoff, February 12, 1984

== Reviews ==
- NY Times by Anna Kisselgoff, February 4, 1984
- NY Times by Jack Anderson, February 21, 1984
- NY Times by Jack Anderson, June 18, 1984
- NY Times by Gia Kourlas, May 17, 2008
