= Edna L. McRae =

American dancer, choreographer and dance teacher

- Born: June 15, 1901; Chicago, Illinois, U.S.
- Died: June 7, 1990 (aged 88); Evanston, Illinois, U.S.
- Occupations: Dancer; Dance teacher
- Years active: 1925-1974

Edna L. McRae (June 15, 1901 – June 7, 1990) was an American dancer, choreographer and dance teacher, often called the grand dame of the Chicago ballet community.

== Early life ==
McRae was born in Chicago, the daughter of William McRae, who was from Canada, and Hana McRae, who came from New York.

She began dancing and teaching dance while still a student at Schurz High School in Chicago and attended the Chicago Normal School of Physical Education. She continued on after graduation to dance with the Pavley-Oukrainsky Ballet and Adolph Bolm's Ballet Intime. She studied professionally with Adolph Bolm in Chicago, Nicolas Legat, Tamara Karsavina and Phyllis Bedells in London, and Mathilde Kschessinskaya, Olga Preobrajenskaya and Vera Trefilova in Paris

McRae taught at Francis Parker School, Chicago Teachers College, the Adolph Bolm School of the Dance, the Pavley and Oukrainsky Ballet School in Chicago, and the Perry-Mansfield Camp in Colorado.

== Career ==
McRae opened her own school of dance in Chicago in 1925. Here she developed many dancers who went on to professional and teaching careers. At the same time she choreographed for the "Enchanted Island" Children's Theatre at the Century of Progress Exposition, 1933/34, Chicago Park District opera groups, the Chicago Concert and Opera Guild, The Society of Polish Artists, Germania Theatre, Sidney J. Page Productions, and the initial season of the Chicago Lyric Opera.

After retirement in 1964, she supervised the original Joffrey Ballet Company's West Coast Apprentice Program. In 1965, and became director of the Summer Scholarship Training Program jointly sponsored by Joffrey Ballet and the Pacific Northwest Ballet Association at Pacific Lutheran University in Tacoma, Washington from 1966 to 1970 and at Berkeley from 1971. She was on the Dance Faculty of Juilliard in 1969 and the faculty of Jacob's Pillow Dance Festival in 1973. Numerous engagements as guest teacher kept her traveling across the United States.

In Chicago, McRae was associate director in charge of the children for the production of the Nutcracker Ballet, presented by the Chicago Tribune at McCormick Place and the Chicago Opera House, from its inception in 1965 to 1972.

== Personal life ==
A near-fatal heart attack in April 1974 brought an abrupt end to McRae's life as a master teacher. She was survived by a niece.

== Awards ==
- 1963: Chicago National Association of Dance Masters: Honorary Member
- 1974: Cliff Dwellers of Chicago: Award of Merit for distinguished service
- 1982: Chicago National Association of Dance Masters: Outstanding Achievement in the Teaching of Dance
- 1986: Ellis-DuBoulay School of Ballet: Edna McRae Scholarships, established by Richard Ellis and Christine Du Boulay
- 1987: Chicago Dance Arts Coalition Ruth Page Award: Lifetime Service to the Field
- 1990: Carl Schurz High School Hall of Fame
