= Piano Pieces =

Ballet choreographed by Jerome Robbins

- Choreographer: Jerome Robbins
- Music: Pyotr Ilyich Tchaikovsky
- Premiere: June 11, 1981; New York State Theater
- Original ballet company: New York City Ballet
- Design: Ben Benson; Ronald Bates

Piano Pieces is a ballet choreographed by Jerome Robbins to music by Pyotr Ilyich Tchaikovsky. The ballet was made for New York City Ballet's Tchaikovsky Festival, and premiered on June 11, 1981, at the New York State Theater.

== Choreography ==
Piano Pieces is danced by seven principal dancers and a corps de ballet of six couples, all dressed in Russian style costumes. The ballet starts with pieces for the ensemble, followed by solos and pas de deux performed by the principal dancers. The full cast returns for the finale, with a male dancer leading the dancers.

Author Amanda Vaill described it as "a dance about the joy of dancing." Deborah Jowitt described that "it's the patterns and choreographic ideas that create a sense of a village, not just the device of people watching others dance." Critic Jennifer Dunning wrote that it "contains some of Robbins's favorite themes, among them playful Russian folk-dance moves, goofy sequences of jumps and a hint or two of competition."

== Production ==
Piano Pieces was created for the New York City Ballet's Tchaikovsky Festival. The festival was conceived by George Balanchine. Robbins, however, was not interested in choreographing to Tchaikovsky's works. He nevertheless choreographed three ballets for the festival. He later recalled, "Two months before the Tchaikovsky festival, I thought, I don't like Tchaikovsky... Why should I do Tchaikovsky? Because Mr. Balanchine wants me to do Tchaikovsky? But you don't necessarily have to enjoy doing something for it to be good."

Piano Pieces uses various piano pieces, including excerpts from The Seasons. Robbins originally planned the ballet to be about a group of dancers rehearsing a fictitious ballet. However, once rehearsals began, he abandoned this idea, and changed the theme to be about the joy of dancing." While the dancers had many rehearsals, he enjoyed the experience more than he expected. Stacy Caddell, who had a small role in the ballet, recalled, "When we did Piano Pieces, it was hard, because Jerry would come in with Version A, B, C, D, E, F, G, up to J—like cut-and-paste." Piano Pieces is also the first ballet Robbins made on Maria Calegari.

The costumes were designed by Ben Benson. The lighting was designed by Ronald Bates.

== Music ==
- Danse Caracteristique, op. 72, no. 4
- Le Paysan Prelude, op. 39, no. 12
- Chanson Populaire, op. 39, no. 13
- Polka, op. 39, no. 14
- Le Petit Cavalier, op. 39, no. 3
- Reverie, op. 9, no. 1
- La Sorciere, op. 39, no. 20
- November - Troika, op. 37, no. 11
- Natha Waltz, op. 51, no. 4
- Mazurka, op. 39, no. 10
- October - Chant d'Automne, op. 37, no. 10
- Polka de Salon, op. 9, no. 2
- June - Barcarolle, op. 37, no. 6
- Scherzo à la russe, op. 1, no. 1

== Original cast ==
The principal dancers in the original cast included:

- Maria Calegari
- Kyra Nichols
- Heather Watts
- Ib Andersen
- Bart Cook
- Daniel Duell
- Joseph Duell

== Performances ==
Piano Pieces premiered on June 12, 1981, at the New York State Theater. The piano was played by Jerry Zimmerman. Later at the festival, when some works had to be cancelled due to injuries, Piano Pieces was performed again.

== Critical reception ==
After the premiere, New York Times critic compared Piano Pieces to Dances at a Gathering, which is set to works by Frédéric Chopin, and commented, "The differences between the two ballets are perhaps not as great as the difference between Chopin and Tchaikovsky. But choreographically, Mr. Robbins's interest in partnering reaches a new peak. Piano Pieces is a brilliant step forward in the art of the pas de deux."
