= Zakouski (ballet) =

Ballet

Zakouski is a ballet made by New York City Ballet ballet master in chief Peter Martins to:

- Vocalise, Op. 34, No. 14 by Sergei Rachmaninoff
- "Parasha's Song" from the opera Mavra by Igor Stravinsky
- The fourth of Cinq Melodies by Sergei Prokofiev
- Valse-Scherzo, Op. 34 by Pyotr Ilyich Tchaikovsky.

The premiere took place on Tuesday, 17 November 1992 at the New York State Theater, Lincoln Center. It was the first role made on Nikolaj Hübbe at City Ballet; he chose to dance it as well at his farewell performance on Sunday, 10 February 2008, at which time he and Yvonne Borree divided the pas de deux with Megan Fairchild and Andrew Veyette, who were dancing it for the first time.

The costumes were designed by British born, American costume designer Barbara Matera.

== Original cast ==
- Margaret Tracey
- Nikolaj Hübbe

== Reviews ==
- Kisselgoff, Anna (February 23, 1993). "Review/Ballet; A Surprise Premiere by Martins". The New York Times.
- NY Times review by Jack Anderson, June 25, 2004
