= Stephanie Saland =

American ballet dancer and teacher

- Born: 1953 or 1954 (age 71–72); Brooklyn, New York, U.S.
- Education: School of American Ballet
- Occupations: ballet dancer; teacher
- Career
- Former groups: New York City Ballet
- Website: www.stephaniesaland.com

Stephanie Saland (born 1953 or 1954) is an American former ballet dancer and teacher. She was spotted by George Balanchine whilst a student at the School of American Ballet, then joined the New York City Ballet in 1972, and was promoted to principal dancer in 1984. She had created roles for both Balanchine and Jerome Robbins, before retiring in 1993. She then started teaching ballet in both the U.S. and internationally.

== Early life and training ==
Saland was born in Brooklyn, New York. Her father, Ronald, was a film producer and director. She was raised in Syosset and Great Neck, Long Island. She started taking dance lessons at age five, but only "sporadically," and she had rejected others' suggestions to pursue dance seriously.

When she was fourteen, Saland learned that handwritten report cards would instead be computerized the following year. "In my mind," she later recalled, "it incited a fear of autonomy, of disappearing into the crowd, something highly disturbing and inhuman." In search of an escape, she decided to pursue a career in dance, which might "make it a little bit different." Within two weeks, she auditioned for the School of American Ballet, one of the options suggested by André Eglevsky, her dance teacher's husband.

Though Saland was accepted by the school, she was initially placed with eleven-year-olds as she was four years behind students her age. Three months later, she was moved up, and later to a class taught by Suki Schorer, where she was spotted by George Balanchine, choreographer and co-founder of the New York City Ballet. Her other teachers at the school include Stanley Williams and Muriel Stuart.

Saland went to high school at Professional Children's School and graduated in 1972. Advised by her family, she planned to study psychology at the New York University before being recruited to join the New York City Ballet.

== Career ==
In 1972, she became an apprentice with the New York City Ballet days after she filled in for another student at the School of American Ballet workshop performance, which was watched by Balanchine. Shortly after that, when the New York City Ballet held the Stravinsky Festival, Saland was chosen by Balanchine to join the company, when more dancers were needed for the festival. She initially found it difficult to follow Balanchine's company classes, and deemed the ballets Balanchine cast her in were unsuitable for her. Six months after Saland joined the company, principal Gelsey Kirkland decided to mentor her, and introduced her to independent teacher Maggie Black, even though at the time, young corps dancers rarely worked with outside teachers. She also took Gyrotonic classes and worked with a physical therapist, and credited both for helping her dance career. In 1984, Saland was named principal dancer.

Though her promotion to principal dancer came after Balanchine's death, she had previously created several roles for him, including in Ballo della Regina and Walpurgisnacht Ballet. Other ballets by Balanchine Saland had danced include Serenade, "Emerald" from Jewels, Vienna Waltzes, Liebeslieder Walzer, Episodes, La Sonnambula, Robert Schumann's Davidsbündlertänze, Square Dance, Divertimento No. 15, as Helena in A Midsummer Night's Dream, Swanilda in Coppélia and Sugar Plum Fairy in The Nutcracker.

She developed a close working relationship with Jerome Robbins. Ballets he created on her include Antique Epigraphs and The Four Seasons. She had also performed his other works, including Dances at a Gathering, In the Night, The Concert, Fancy Free, Opus 19/The Dreamer, and The Goldberg Variations.

In 1993, Saland retired from the New York City Ballet. Her final performance was in Balanchine's Vienna Waltzes, though the fact that it was her farewell was unannounced. That performance was also filmed for the PBS broadcast "The Balanchine Celebration." She later noted she decided to retire due to "physical challenges and injuries."

Following her retirement from dance, she moved to Seattle with her partner. She had no plans to work in dance, though at her partner's encouragement, she started teaching ballet. She opted to teach freelance, and had taught in both the U.S. and internationally, including at the Youth America Grand Prix. Apart from the Balanchine technique, her classes were also influenced by qigong, yoga and teachings from her former teacher Stanley Williams.
