= 2 and 3 Part Inventions =

1994 ballet by Jerome Robbins

2 and 3 Part Inventions is a ballet made by New York City Ballet ballet master Jerome Robbins on students at its affiliated school, the School of American Ballet, to Bach's Inventions and Sinfonias, BWV 772–801, (1720–23). The premiere took place on Saturday, 4 June 1994 at the Juilliard Theater, Lincoln Center. The City Ballet premiere was Thursday, 19 January 1995, and it was revived for City Ballet's 90th anniversary celebration of the choreographer, performed again by students from S.A.B.

== Casts ==
=== Original SAB ===
- Kristina Fernandez
- Eliane Munier
- Riolama Lorenzo
- Jennifer Chipman
- Benjamin Millepied
- Amaury Lebrun
- Alex Ketley
- Seth Belliston

=== NYCB premiere ===
- Wendy Whelan
- Jenifer Ringer
- Samantha Allen
- Miranda Weese
- Ethan Stiefel
- Alexander Ritter
- Christopher Wheeldon
- James Fayette

== Articles ==
- NY Times, Anna Kisselgoff, April 5, 2005
- NY Times, Anna Kisselgoff, May 11, 1998

== Reviews ==
- NY Times, Anna Kisselgoff, June 6, 1994
- NY Times, Anna Kisselgoff, January 21, 1995
- NY Times, Jack Anderson, January 18, 2001
- NY Times, Gia Kourlas, June 16, 2008
