= Walpurgisnacht Ballet =

Walpurgisnacht Ballet is a ballet made by New York City Ballet's co-founder and founding choreographer George Balanchine for a 1975 production of Gounod's 1859 Faust at the Théâtre National de l'Opéra, Paris, including Gounod's additional ballet music from 1869. The New York City Ballet premiere was the first presentation of the dance as an independent work, on Thursday, 15 May 1980 at the New York State Theater, Lincoln Center. Balanchine had previously made dances for productions of Faust at the Opéra de Monte-Carlo, danced by Diaghilev's Ballets Russes; in 1935 for the Metropolitan Opera; and 1945 for the Opera Nacional, Mexico City.

Walpurgisnacht is found at the beginning of the last act of Faust. Mephistopheles shows Faust the folk celebration before May Day, when the souls of the dead are released briefly to wander as they will. The ballet does not directly depict the Walpurgis Night but builds on a sense of joyful revelry.

== Casts ==
=== Original ===
- Paris Opéra Ballet

=== NYCB ===
- Suzanne Farrell
- Heather Watts
- Stephanie Saland
- Judith Fugate
- Kyra Nichols
- Adam Lüders
- Ben Huys

== Reviews ==
- Sunday NY Times by John Martin, 24 August 1947
- Sunday NY Times by Anna Kisselgoff, 18 May 1980
- NY Times by Alastair MacAulay, 1 June 2010
