= White Oak Dance Project =

White Oak Dance Project was a dance company founded in 1990 by Mikhail Baryshnikov and Mark Morris.

The company took the name of the animal preservation and land plantation owned by philanthropist and Baryshnikov friend Howard Gilman. Gilman built a beautiful dance studio on his White Oak Plantation in Yulee, Florida near Jacksonville, Florida for the company to create its first tour.

The company continued to tour until 2002, allowing the Foundation to concentrate on the 2004 opening of the Baryshnikov Arts Center in Manhattan. The company featured alumni of major dance companies and commissioned new pieces from Morris, Paul Taylor, Twyla Tharp, Jerome Robbins, David Gordon and others.
