= Violin Concerto (Adams) =

American composer

- by John Adams
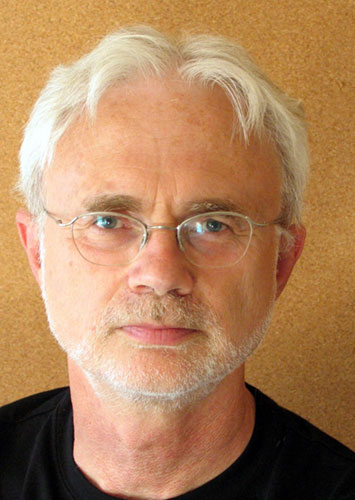
- Portrait of John Adams
- Genre: Minimalism
- Form: Violin Concerto
- Commissioned by: New York City Ballet
- Composed: 1993
- Dedication: David Huntley
- Duration: about 35 minutes
- Movements: Three

Premiere
- Date: January 19, 1994
- Location: Ordway Music Theater, Saint Paul, Minnesota
- Conductor: Edo de Waart
- Performers: Jorja Fleezanis (violin) Minnesota Orchestra

The Violin Concerto by the American composer John Adams was written in 1993. Its premiere was on January 19, 1994, by Jorja Fleezanis with the Minnesota Orchestra, conducted by Edo de Waart, at the Ordway Music Theater, Saint Paul, Minnesota.

The piece was co-commissioned by the New York City Ballet. It received the University of Louisville Grawemeyer Award for Music Composition.

A typical performance lasts around 35 minutes.

The Violin Concerto has been called "the most original approach to the genre since the Alban Berg Concerto".

== Structure ==
The work is in three movements:

1. Quarter note = 78
2. Chaconne: Body through which the dream flows
3. Toccare

It is dedicated to the memory of David Huntley of Boosey & Hawkes.

== Instrumentation ==
The work calls for solo violin accompanied by an orchestra with the following instrumentation.

Woodwinds
2 flutes (both doubling piccolos)
2 oboes (2nd doubling cor anglais)
2 clarinets (2nd doubling bass clarinet)
2 bassoons

Brass
2 horns in F
trumpet in C

Percussion
2 players, doubling on
timpani
guiro
3 bongo drums
2 conga drums
bass drum
suspended cymbal
tambourine
claves
high cowbell
vibraphone
marimba
tubular bells

Keyboards
2 synthesizers

Strings
violin I (minimum 6)
violin II (minimum 6)
violas (minimum 5)
cellos (minimum 5)
double basses (minimum 2)

== Recordings ==
The first recording was by Gidon Kremer and the London Symphony Orchestra conducted by Kent Nagano, released as Nonesuch 79360–2.

In 2017 Orchid Classics released a recording (coupled with the Korngold violin concerto), with soloist Ilya Gringolts and the Copenhagen Philharmonic conducted by Santtu-Matias Rouvali.
