= A Suite of Dances =

- Choreographer: Jerome Robbins
- Music: Johann Sebastian Bach
- Premiere: March 3, 1994; New York State Theater
- Original ballet company: White Oak Dance Project
- Design: Santo Loquasto
- Created for: Mikhail Baryshnikov

A Suite of Dances is a ballet choreographed by Jerome Robbins to Johann Sebastian Bach's Cello Suites. The ballet was created for Mikhail Baryshnikov and premiered on March 3, 1994, at the New York State Theater.

== Production ==
Jerome Robbins had earlier attempted to choreograph Bach's Cello Suites with dancers Victor Castelli and Peter Boal, although the project was abandoned. He used the music for A Suite of Dances with Mikhail Baryshnikov, who was in his 40s, as the sole dancer instead. As Baryshnikov was touring and Robbins was staging his works in Paris and St. Petersburg, A Suite of Dances was made over the course of two years, and according to Robbins, most of the choreography was made without Baryshnikov's presence, before the ballet, a 16-minutes-long solo, premiered at a performance of the White Oak Dance Project, Baryshnikov's company, with Wendy Sutter on the cello.

=== Music ===
The ballet uses the following music from Bach's Cello Suites:

- Prelude from Suite No. 1 in G major, BWV 1007
- Sarabande from Suite No. 5 in C minor, BWV 1011
- Gigue from Suite No. 1 in G major, BWV 1007
- Prelude from Suite No. 6 in D major, BWV 1012

== Revivals ==
In May 1994, at a New York City Ballet performance, Baryshnikov performed A Suite of Dances as a guest artist, with Sutter also returning. The ballet then entered Paris Opera Ballet's repertory, and New York City Ballet's members danced it for the first time in 1997. In subsequent revivals, the ballet is usually danced by an experienced dancer. In March 1999, eight months after Robbins died, Nicolas Le Riche danced A Suite of Dances at a Robbins tribute gala organized by the Paris Opera Ballet. In 2008, at New York City Ballet's Jerome Robbins Celebration program, Le Riche reprised the role. The ballet has also been performed at Carlos Acosta's solo program in 2009 and the Vail Dance Festival in 2018, by American Ballet Theatre's Herman Cornejo.

== Videography ==
In light of the impact of the COVID-19 coronavirus pandemic on the performing arts, Paris Opera Ballet released a recording of A Suite of Dances, as a part of the Tribute to Jerome Robbins program. The Vail Dance Festival released a video of an excerpt danced by Cornejo online.
