= Suite of Dances (ballet) =

Suite of Dances is a ballet made by New York City Ballet ballet master Jerome Robbins from his 1974 Dybbuk Variations, which was itself a "cut" version of his Dybbuk from the same year. Suite of Dances' premiere took place on 17 January 1980 at the New York State Theater, Lincoln Center. The eponymous 1974 music to all three versions is that of Leonard Bernstein.

== Cast ==
=== Original ===
- Patricia McBride
- Helgi Tomasson

=== 1981 ===
- Bart Cook

== Reviews ==
- NY Times review, Jennifer Dunning, January 25, 1981
