= Darci Kistler =

American ballerina (born 1964)

- Born: June 4, 1964 (age 61); Riverside, California, U.S.
- Occupation: Ballerina
- Years active: 1980–2009
- Spouse: Peter Martins (m. 1991)
- Children: Talicia Tove Martins

Darci Kistler (born June 4, 1964) is an American ballerina. She is often said to be the last muse for choreographer George Balanchine.

== Early life ==
Kistler was born in Riverside, California, the fifth child (with four older brothers) of a medical doctor and his wife. Her brothers excelled in amateur wrestling, and she followed them into water-skiing, basketball, football and horseback riding.

== Ballet career ==
At age 4, Kistler received her first tutu and began ballet training that same year. She claimed although she was always athletic, she could never keep up with her brothers—so ballet turned out to be one cornerstone she had mastered. After seeing a ballet performance of Rudolf Nureyev and Margot Fonteyn, she decided she wanted to take up ballet herself. She studied with Mary Lynn at Mary Lynn's Ballet Arts and later with Irina Kosmovska in Los Angeles.

In early 1979, Kistler was selected to study at New York City Ballet's School of American Ballet (SAB), where she met George Balanchine. She joined the New York City Ballet (NYCB) corps de ballet in 1980, and was featured in a Time article before the end of the year.

Kistler was promoted to (NYCB) soloist in 1981 and principal dancer in 1982, the youngest ever at 17 years. Signature roles include Balanchine's Jewels (Diamonds), Agon, Prodigal Son and Symphony in C. She danced the rôle of the Sugarplum Fairy in City Ballet's 1993 film version of The Nutcracker. She eventually wrote her own autobiography "Ballerina: My Story" as a children's book.

Kistler joined the SAB's permanent faculty in 1994.

Throughout her career, she had numerous dance-related injuries, including a broken ankle that sidelined her for three years. She went through several surgeries, including for her back.

In February 2009, Kistler announced her retirement from New York City Ballet at the end of the 2010 season. Her farewell performance took place on June 27, 2010, and consisted of ballets choreographed by Balanchine and Martins:

- Monumentum pro Gesualdo
- Movements for Piano and Orchestra
- A Midsummer Night's Dream excerpt
- Danses Concertantes
- Swan Lake final act

== Personal life ==
Kistler married New York City Ballet's balletmaster-in-chief Peter Martins in 1991. In July 1992, Martins was arrested and held for five hours after Kistler phoned the police for help. Kistler filed an affidavit accusing him of assaulting her, pushing and slapping her, and cutting and bruising her arms and legs, leading to a charge of third-degree assault (a misdemeanor). Kistler dropped the charges a few days later, saying she preferred to resolve the matter without the court's intervention. When she next performed in a ballet two days later, she reportedly wore heavy makeup to conceal bruises she had suffered. Several people who knew the two well claimed it wasn't the first time Martins had hit Kistler.

Kistler and Martins have one daughter, Talicia Tove Martins, born June 13, 1996. Talicia aspires to be an actress.

=== Jerome Robbins ===
- Andantino
- Gershwin Concerto
- Piccolo Balletto

=== Ulysses Dove ===
- Red Angels

=== Robert La Fosse ===
- Danses de Cour

=== Peter Martins ===
- Adams Violin Concerto
- Bach Concerto V
- Burleske
- The Chairman Dances
- Delight of the Muses
- Guide to Strange Places
- Harmonielehre
- Morgen
- Octet NYCB premiere
- Piano-Rag-Music
- Romeo + Juliet Lady Capulet
- The Sleeping Beauty
- Stabat Mater
- Suite from Histoire du Soldat
- Symphonic Dances
- Symphony No. 1
- Tālā Gaisma
- Thou Swell
- Todo Buenos Aires
- Viva Verdi

== Featured roles ==
=== George Balanchine ===
- Agon
- Apollo
- Brahms–Schoenberg Quartet
- Bugaku
- Concerto Barocco
- Episodes
- The Nutcracker Dewdrop and the Sugar Plum Fairy
- Jewels Diamonds
- A Midsummer Night's Dream
- Monumentum pro Gesualdo
- Movements for Piano and Orchestra
- Mozartiana
- Orpheus
- Prodigal Son
- Robert Schumann's Davidsbündlertänze
- La Sonnambula
- Sylvia pas de deux
- Symphony in C second movement
- Tzigane
- Union Jack
- Variations pour une Porte et un Soupir
- Vienna Waltzes
- Walpurgisnacht Ballet
- Western Symphony

=== Jerome Robbins ===
- In G Major
- In the Night

=== Peter Martins ===
- Papillons
- Songs of the Auvergne
- Valse Triste

== Television ==
- PBS Dance in America
  - Bournonville Dances William Tell pas de deux
  - Serenade
- PBS Kennedy Center Honors tribute to Alexandra Danilova
  - Swan Lake pas de deux
- PBS Dance in America The Balanchine Celebration
- PBS Live from Lincoln Center New York City Ballet's Diamond Project: Ten Years of New Choreography, 2002
  - Them Twos
- PBS Live from Lincoln Center Lincoln Center Celebrates Balanchine 100, 2004
  - Liebeslieder Walzer
