= Peter Martins =

Danish ballet dancer and choreographer (born 1946)

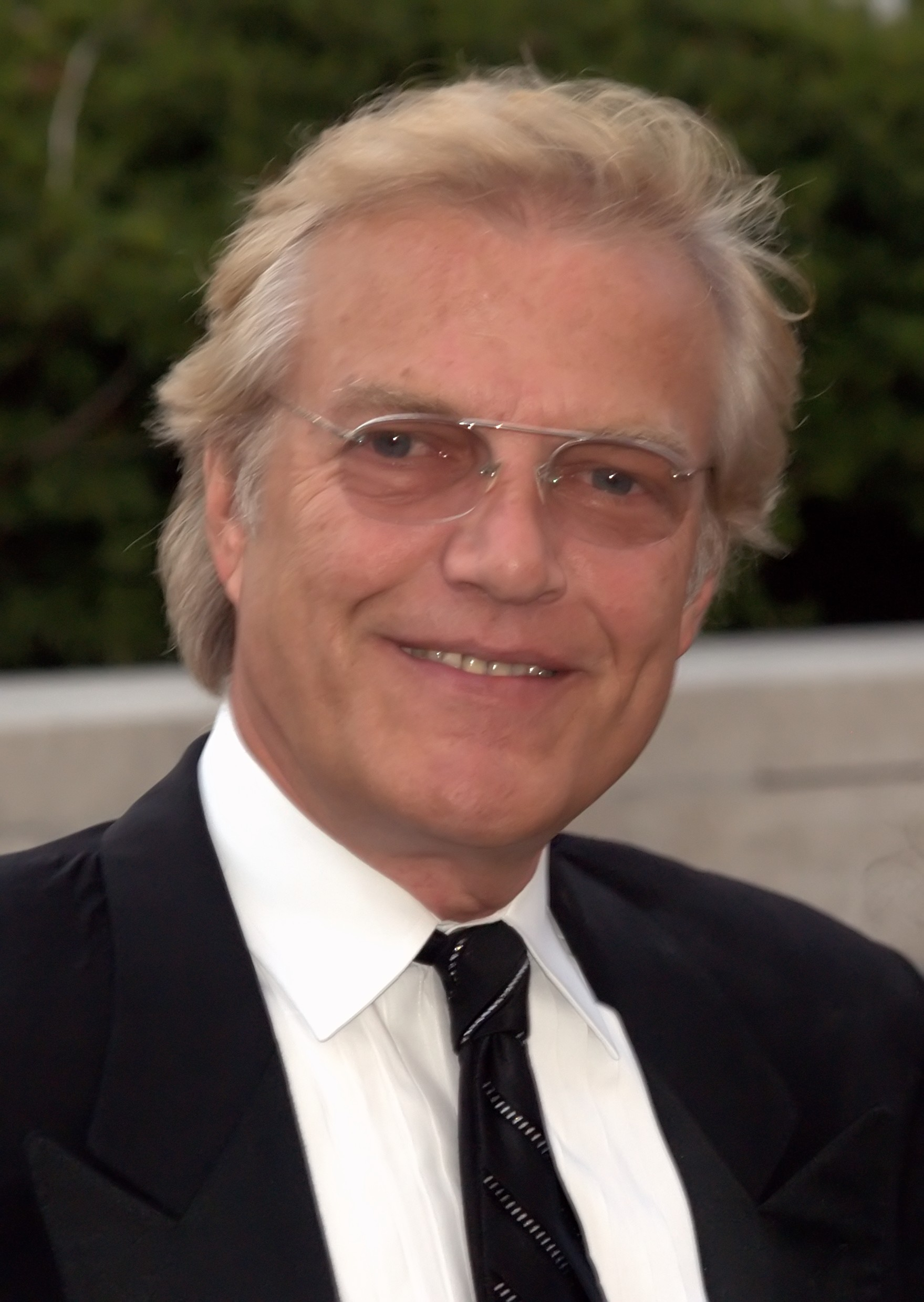
- Martins at the opening night of the 2009 Metropolitan Opera
- Born: 27 October 1946 (age 80); Copenhagen, Denmark
- Occupations: Dancer, choreographer
- Spouse(s): Darci Kistler (m. 1991); Lise la Cour (first marriage)
- Children: Talicia Tove Martins; Nilas Martins

Peter Martins (born 27 October 1946) is a Danish former ballet dancer and choreographer. Martins was a principal dancer with the Royal Danish Ballet and with the New York City Ballet, where he joined George Balanchine, Jerome Robbins, and John Taras as balletmaster in 1981. He retired from dancing in 1983, having achieved the rank of danseur noble, becoming Co-Ballet Master-In-Chief with Robbins. From 1990 until January 2018, he was responsible for artistic leadership of City Ballet as well as the School of American Ballet.

== Early life ==
Martins was born and raised in Copenhagen, Denmark. His parents were Børge Martins, an engineer, and Tove Christa Ornberg, a pianist. His maternal aunt and uncle, Leif and Elna Ornberg, members of the Royal Danish Ballet, started teaching him ballroom combinations when he was five years of age; when he applied to ballet school, however, he was the subject of discrimination because his aunt and uncle had been Nazi sympathizers. It was his older sisters who originally tried out for the Royal Ballet of Denmark when Peter himself was the age of seven. When they did, he was sitting in the waiting room reading a Donald Duck comic book. They were denied admittance. Then Peter was asked to "point his foot". He did especially well and was admitted.

== Career ==
Martins began his ballet training in 1953 with the Royal Danish Ballet. He joined the corps de ballet in 1965 and was promoted to soloist in 1967.

Martins left Denmark in 1970 and became a principal dancer with the New York City Ballet (NYCB), though he had been performing as a guest artist since 1967. Martins danced a wide variety of roles, but is most known for the titular role in Apollo and the Cavalier in Balanchine's Nutcracker. In 1978, he was made the subject of the documentary, Peter Martins: A Dancer. He danced frequently with Suzanne Farrell. However, he terminated her employment with the NYCB in 1993; she went on to found her own company, which disbanded in 2017.

Martins retired from dancing in 1983, becoming Co-Ballet Master-In-Chief alongside Jerome Robbins, and assumed the job of sole Balletmaster-in-Chief in 1990. Martins was Balanchine's personal choice of successor. However, early in his career as a balletmaster, Martins faced criticism for perceived deviations from Balanchine's style. Martins also served as the artistic director and chairman of faculty of the School of American Ballet, the training division of the NYCB and the venue through which it receives most of its dancers. From 1990 until January 2018, he was solely responsible for artistic leadership of City Ballet. In 2005 his salary was $619,000, and in 2008 he received $699,000 in pay and benefits.

Martins regularly choreographed new works for both companies. His first piece was Calcium Light Night, set to music by Charles Ives, which premiered in 1977 and received positive reviews. His more recent pieces include Octet, Friandises, and Romeo + Juliet, and new choreographies for Stabat Mater, The Sleeping Beauty, and Swan Lake. He also choreographed the Barbie movies Barbie in the Nutcracker and Barbie of Swan Lake. In 2000, Martins, along with talent scout Irene Diamond, founded the New York Choreographic Institute.

=== Allegations of sexual assault ===
In December 2017, an investigation was announced by New York City Ballet into accusations by dancers within the company of physical and sexual assault by Martins, and using his power to obtain sexual favors, dating back to 1983. One of his accusers, Wilhelmina Frankfurt, a former New York City Ballet ballerina and later a dance educator, said: "Am I a victim of Martins abuse? Yes. Was it sexual? Yes. Was it consensual? No [...] It was scary. One incident that occurred [...] He [...] pulled me into his dressing room and, exposed himself to me. [And one incident is] so big I don’t think I can talk about it."

Martins took a leave of absence that month from both the New York City Ballet and its School of the American Ballet, after the allegations came to light, and in January 2018 he retired. Martins denied any misconduct. A two-month investigation of the New York City Ballet and its School of the American Ballet "did not corroborate the allegations of harassment or violence both made in the anonymous letter and reported in the media regarding Mr. Martins". This was not a criminal investigation and was conducted by NYCB, Inc.'s own attorneys.

== Awards, collaborations, and written work ==
He received a Dance Magazine Award and Cue's Golden Apple Award in 1977. An Award for Arts and Culture, City of New York, 1981. The title of Knight of the Order of the Dannebrog in 1983. 1984 Nominee Primetime Emmy Outstanding Achievement in Choreography for "Great Performances: Dance in America" For episode "Choreographer's Notebook: Stravinsky Piano Ballets by Peter Martins". An award of Merit, Philadelphia Art Alliance, 1985. And a Liberty Award, 1986. He was nominated for the 1986 Tony Award for Best Choreographer for Song & Dance. Martins is a champion of contemporary music, working often with composer John Adams. His autobiography, Far From Denmark was published in 1982. Martins was named Man of the Year by the Danish American Society, 1980. His exercise regimen, titled NYCB Workout and designed with the New York Sports Club, first appeared in book form in 1997, with a DVD and a sequel produced later. Martins was inducted into the National Museum of Dance's Mr. & Mrs. Cornelius Vanderbilt Whitney Hall of Fame in 2008.

== Personal life ==
Martins had a long-term romantic relationship with Heather Watts during her career as a principal dancer with the New York City Ballet. In 2017, Martins was accused of picking up Watts and slamming her into a cement wall. In ballerina Gelsey Kirkland's book Dancing on My Grave (1986), she describes Martins dragging Watts up and down a flight of stairs.

He was married to Lise la Cour, a ballerina he danced with at the Royal Ballet of Denmark. He had a child with her, Nilas. They met while they were both with the Royal Danish Ballet and after their divorce, he was a guest-artist with the New York City Ballet and eventually moved to America to dance with the latter company full-time. Nilas eventually followed his father to America, to New York City and to the New York City Ballet.

In July 1992, Martins was arrested and held for five hours after his 28-year-old wife of seven months, New York City Ballet principal ballerina Darci Kistler, phoned the police for help. His wife filed an affidavit accusing him of assaulting her, pushing and slapping her, and cutting and bruising her arms and legs and continuing to hit her after she fell under his attack. He was charged with third-degree assault (a misdemeanor). Kistler dropped the charges a few days later, saying she preferred to resolve the matter without the court's intervention. When she next performed in a ballet two days later, she reportedly wore heavy makeup to conceal bruises she had suffered. Several people who knew the two well claimed it wasn't the first time Martins had hit her. Peter Wolff, a member of the school's board of directors, said that the assault charge was "a personal matter", would not affect Martins’ career, and that it had "nothing to do with his competency or his support in the ballet community."

In 2011, Martins was charged with DWI in Yonkers. He pleaded guilty to a reduced charge of driving while impaired. In December 2017, Martins was arrested after a three-car crash and charged with drunk driving, refusal to take a breath test, and backing unsafely. He pleaded not guilty in Ardsley Village Court, and his license was suspended.

Kistler and Martins have one daughter, Talicia Tove Martins, born June 13, 1996. He has a son, Nilas Martins, who also was a member of NYCB before himself retiring.
