= Irène Lidova =

Russian-French dance critic, writer, presenter and producer

- Born: Irina Kaminskaya; 7 January 1907; Moscow, Russian Empire
- Died: 23 May 2002 (aged 95); Paris, France
- Occupations: Writer, presenter and producer
- Spouse: Serge Lido

Irène Lidova (née Kaminskaya; 7 January 1907 – 23 May 2002) was a Russian-French dance critic, writer, presenter and producer. She worked in fashion journalism for the magazine Vu before reviewing dance for the weekly literary publication Marianne. Lidova worked as an organiser for concert performances and co-established the Les Ballets des Champs-Elysées in 1945. She joined Roland Petit's Les Ballets de Paris-Roland Petit in 1948 and then became an associate of Milorad Mišković's small dance company in 1956. Lidova also contributed to dance magazines and wrote 27 texts for the dance photographer's Serge Lido's 27 published albums. She was named Chevalier in the Ordre des Arts et des Lettres in 1979.

== Early life ==
On 7 January 1907, Lidova was born as Irina Kaminskaya in Moscow, Russia. Her father was a lawyer and her mother was a medical doctor. Lidova had one younger sister and began ballet at the Music and Dance Conservatoire. She spent some of her early years in Petrograd, and her family emigrated from the post-revolutionary Russia to Paris by horse-drawn sledge via the frozen Gulf of Finland when she was young. She was first educated at a Russian school, and then at the Sorbonne. At university, Lidova did ballet under the direction of the Russian Imperial Ballet prima ballerina Olga Preobrajenska at the Studio Wacker, art history, French and Russian literature and also took lessons on how to draw.

== Career ==
Following her graduation, she went into fashion journalism and did the layouts for the magazine Vu. Lidova persuaded Vu's editor to publish a feature on the ballerina and Nicholas II mistress Mathilde Kschessinska. Lidova collaborated with photographers such as Brassaï. In 1939, she began reviewing dance for the weekly literary publication Marianne, following an invitation to become its dance critic. She was also invited to edit the new publication called France Magazine whilst continuing to study dance at the amateur level. In 1943 and 1944, Lidova organised Janine Charrat and Roland Petit's first concert performances in Paris. The success of these concerts meant Lidova was invited to organise a series of ten dance evenings, introducing Jean Babilée, Zizi Jeanmaire, Ethery Pagava and Nina Vyroubova.

Prior to the Liberation of Paris in 1944, she was injured by shrapnel whilst was walking in the street. She was able to make a full recovery. Lidova co-established the Les Ballets des Champs-Elysées at the Théâtre de la Ville in the following year. She served as the ballet's general secretary, and worked at the Théâtre des Champs-Élysées, where she devised Le Dejeuner sur l'herbe for Petit. Lidova was invited to join Petit's Les Ballets de Paris-Roland Petit he established in 1948 following the two disliking the atmosphere at the Théâtre des Champs-Élysées. Lidova helped Gene Kelly in the casting of the film Invitation to the Dance and was an advisor to multiple opera houses putting on ballets, such as La Fenice putting on productions by Serge Lifar and Bronislava Nijinska and Callas in The Sicilian Vespers opening the new Turin Opera. She organised a 1947 conference on Vaslav Nijinsky that was promoted by the disproved rumour he had died in Hungary.

She decided to abandon her commitment to Petit and not direct ballet again following persuasion from the dancer Milorad Mišković. In 1956, Lidova became Mišković's associate in his small company to encourage mainly young soloists in the performances of new works. The two toured the world for the next decade without funding. She consulted in the suggestion of artists and ballets to the Nervi Festival director Mario Porcile in Italy and oversaw logistics. Lidova was the organiser of a series of programmes at La Fenice in Venice in 1971 and persuaded the ageing Bronislava Nijinska to revive Les Noces. She contributed to the dance magazines Ballet Annual; Balletto Oggi in Milan; Dance News in New York; Dance and Dancers in London and Les Saisons de la Danse in Paris. Lidova authored 17 Visages de la danse francaise in 1953 and Roland Petit in 1956. She published her autobiography, Ma Vie avec la danse, in 1992, and wrote 27 texts for Serge Lido's 27 published albums.

== Personal life ==
She was married to the Franco-Russian dance photographer Serge Lido until his death in 1984. They had no children. Lidova was named Chevalier in the Ordre des Arts et des Lettres in 1979. On 23 May 2002, she died in Paris, France. Lidova never returned to her native Russia.

== Legacy ==
The Times wrote "she enhanced French culture without being French" just like Paris Opera Ballet director Serge Lifar did and "embodied the soul of French ballet for a half-century from the Second World War onwards." The New York Public Library holds a 1976 audio recording by Andrew Mark Wentink of Lidova and her husband in French in its Oral History Project of The New York Public Library for the Performing Arts.
