= Claire Sombert =

French ballerina and ballet instructor

Claire Sombert (1935–2008) was a French ballerina and ballet instructor.

== Life ==
Born in Courbevoie near Paris, Sombert began studying dance at the age of twelve with Yves Brieux. She later trained under Russian instructors Victor Gsovsky.

Sombert made her professional debut in Lausanne in 1950. At sixteen, she joined Janine Charrat's company and performed in Passage de l’Etoile. She subsequently worked with Roland Petit on Le Loup, Jean Babilée at La Scala in Le Jeune Homme et la Mort, Milorad Miskovitch, and other choreographers. In 1972, she became a principal dancer at Le Ballet du Rhin, remaining for two years. Choreographers such as Françoise Adret, Maurice Béjart, Victor Gsovsky, Serge Lifar, and Milko Šparemblek created roles for her.

Sombert performed classical ballets including Giselle in Cuba, Swan Lake at the Bolshoi Theatre and the Kirov Theatre, Cinderella with the Cuevas Ballet, Coppélia, Raymonda, Suite en Blanc, Sylvia, and Les Sylphides.

From 1980, Sombert served as the inspector of dance for the City of Paris, where she developed educational programs incorporating music and visual arts for children with limited access to dance lessons. Sombert co-founded the association Terpsychore with Marcel Landowski and Yvette Chauviré to preserve French choreography and established a museum for dance. She also directed thirteen documentary films on classical dance.

Sombert performed in approximately thirty-five countries across Europe, Africa, the Americas, and the Middle East, and appeared as a guest artist with the London Festival Ballet. She is known for her role in the first section, “Circus,” of Gene Kelly's film Invitation to the Dance (1956), where she was partnered by Igor Youskevitch and Gene Kelly.
