= Nicholas Polajenko =

American ballet dancer and ballet master (1930–2015)

- Born: 1930; New York City, U.S.
- Died: August 4, 2015; Delray Beach, Florida, U.S.
- Occupations: Ballet dancer, ballet master, teacher
- Years active: 1947–1988

Nicholas Polajenko (1930 – 4 August 2015) (Note: Koegler's The Concise Oxford Dictionary of Ballet gives his date of birth as 15 December 1932; other accounts give 1930.) was an American ballet dancer, ballet master and teacher. He danced with the Grand Ballet du Marquis de Cuevas and, from 1966, as a danseur étoile of the Ballet du Grand Théâtre de Genève, where he later became ballet master. In 1952 he created a role in Antony Tudor's Trio con Brio at the Jacob's Pillow Dance Festival.

== Early life and career ==
Polajenko was born in New York City. He studied with the Russian teachers Ludmilla Schollar and Anatole Vilzak, (Note: Accounts of his training differ. Koegler and a 1951 Les Ballets de Paris programme name Schollar and Vilzak. Two profiles published in the Houston press within three months of each other in 1976 gave longer lists that do not agree: one named Igor Youskevitch and Vilzak in the United States and Olga Preobrajenska, Vera Volkova and Harald Lander in Paris; the other named Vilzak, Schollar, Aubrey Hitchins, Preobrajenska and Lander. Both were probably supplied by the subject.) made his debut with the Ottawa Ballet Company in 1947 and joined the Metropolitan Ballet in 1948, going on to dance with the Ballets des Champs-Élysées, Ballets de Paris, the Metropolitan Opera Ballet and London Festival Ballet. He appeared in the original 1947 Broadway production of Music in My Heart, billed as Nicolai Polajenko.

An early notice appeared in The Evening Star of Washington, D.C. in December 1951, reviewing a touring production of Die Fledermaus at the Gayety Theater. The critic Alice Eversman described "an expert ballet with Tatiana Grantzeva ... as premiere danseuse, and the graceful Polajenko as premier danseur."

=== Trio con Brio (1952) ===
On 27 June 1952 Polajenko danced in the premiere of Trio con Brio at the Jacob's Pillow Dance Festival in Lee, Massachusetts, with Tatiana Grantzeva and Ralph McWilliams. The three dancers had been assembled from different companies for a Pillow touring group — Grantzeva from the Ballet Russe de Monte Carlo, Polajenko from the Cuevas company and McWilliams from Ballet Theatre — and the work was made on them. Because the piece was a classical showpiece unlike his usual style, Antony Tudor credited the choreography at the premiere to a fictitious "Vispitin", taking proper credit at later performances.

A silent 16 mm film of the original cast survives in the Jacob's Pillow Archives. The ballet was considered lost until 2008, when it was reconstructed from that film and revived by New York Theatre Ballet.

== Les Ballets de Paris ==
After a year with the Ballets des Champs-Élysées Polajenko joined Roland Petit's Les Ballets de Paris. A souvenir programme from the company's American tour describes him as one of only three Americans in the troupe, notes that he had studied with Vilzak and Schollar and appeared in Music in My Heart and Annie Get Your Gun, and records that he alternated with Serge Perrault as Don José and as the Toreador in Petit's Carmen.

== London's Festival Ballet ==
Polajenko joined London Festival Ballet at the beginning of March 1954 on a one-year contract, appearing under the name Nicholai Polajenko alongside Anton Dolin, John Gilpin, Oleg Briansky and Natalie Krassovska. His roles included Phoebus in Nicholas Beriozoff's Esmeralda, Prince Siegfried in Swan Lake, the Hussar in Massine's Le Beau Danube, and The Nutcracker opposite Nora Kovach.

Critical reception was mixed. Dance and Dancers described him as "an unassuming partner, modest and direct, who lifts well and without fuss", crediting his dancing with "a stylish competence, with high accurate air-turns and precise beats". Ballet Today, reviewing the same season, judged his Phoebus marred by "lax movement, thoughtless finishing and an air of not caring overmuch".

In August 1955 he appeared in Harald Lander's Études at the Royal Festival Hall, in a cast with Toni Lander, John Gilpin and Anton Dolin. He and Dale left the company late in 1955 to dance a season in East Africa.

In December 1956 he and Daphne Dale appeared as guest artists with the newly formed Ballet do Rio de Janeiro, returning to New York in January 1957, where they were signed by the Marquis de Cuevas.

In August 1957, during the Cuevas company's tenth-anniversary season at the Alhambra in Paris, David Lichine created Corrida on Polajenko and the Brazilian ballerina Beatriz Consuelo. Reviewing the premiere, the Neue Zürcher Zeitung thought little of Lichine's choreography but praised the two young dancers, predicting a great career for them. He went on dancing Corrida for the rest of his performing career.

== Grand Ballet du Marquis de Cuevas ==
Polajenko was a principal dancer with the Grand Ballet du Marquis de Cuevas from 1956 to 1962. The Dance Encyclopedia lists him among the company's leading dancers, alongside Rosella Hightower, Marjorie Tallchief, George Skibine, Nina Vyroubova and Serge Golovine. Reviewing the company at the Théâtre de Beaulieu in Lausanne in July 1958, Jean Nicollier of the Gazette de Lausanne named him among the young men advancing the company, alongside Serge Golovine.

In August 1959 he danced the title role in Sébastien — music by Gian Carlo Menotti, choreography by Edward Caton, designs by Leonor Fini — opposite Rosella Hightower at the Grand Casino in Geneva. Eugène Fabre of the Journal de Genève praised his sustained mime and called his discovery of the dying courtesan a moment of complete beauty.

In August 1961 he danced Prince Florimund in the third act of The Sleeping Beauty opposite Nina Vyroubova at the Théâtre de Verdure in Geneva.

After the company dissolved following the death of the Marquis de Cuevas, Polajenko toured with a group of eight dancers assembled by Serge Golovine. Reviewing them in November 1962, Fabre singled out an adagio to Bizet choreographed by David Lichine and danced by Polajenko with Daphne Dale as one of the evening's finest moments.

== Harkness Ballet ==
The Harkness Ballet was founded in New York in 1964 by Rebekah Harkness, with George Skibine as artistic director and choreography by Alexandra Danilova, Vera Volkova and Alvin Ailey; Marjorie Tallchief was appointed prima ballerina and Polajenko guest premier danseur. As a guest artist with the company, Polajenko partnered Tallchief at the White House on 5 October 1964, dancing for President Lyndon B. Johnson and his guests at the state dinner for President Diosdado Macapagal of the Philippines.

With the Cuevas company his roles included the novice convict in John Taras's Piège de lumière, which Dance and Dancers called "his best rôle", and he created a pas de deux with Rosella Hightower in Taras's Soirée Musicale at its first London performance. In Paris that winter he was one of the four men in Anton Dolin's Variations pour Quatre, the male counterpart to Dolin's Pas de Quatre, alongside Serge Golovine, Jean-Pierre Tupin and George Goviloff.

On 27 October 1960 the company premiered a new production of The Sleeping Beauty at the Théâtre des Champs-Élysées in Paris, begun by Bronislava Nijinska and completed by Robert Helpmann, with décor by Raymundo de Larrain. Polajenko danced Prince Florimund opposite Rosella Hightower as Aurora, alternating in the role with Serge Golovine. It was the last major production mounted by the Marquis de Cuevas, who died the following year; Rudolf Nureyev joined the production after his defection in 1961 and made his European debut in it.

In November 1966 he appeared at the fourth Festival international de danse de Paris at the Théâtre des Champs-Élysées, where the Grand Ballet Classique de France staged a tribute to the late marquis. Polajenko danced with Rosella Hightower, Genia Melikova and Liane Daydé in works from the Cuevas repertoire including Corrida and Serge Lifar's Suite en blanc.

== Ballet du Grand Théâtre de Genève ==
Polajenko joined the Ballet du Grand Théâtre de Genève for the 1966–67 season, under the direction of Serge Golovine. Introducing him and Gerda Daum as newcomers to the company, Brigitte Monneyron of the Gazette de Lausanne described their pas de deux as a moment of perfect harmony and called Polajenko "un partenaire parfait d'expression". His engagement had been announced in the Tribune de Genève that May, which reported that he had arrived from New York to take up the post after the Grand Ballet du Marquis de Cuevas. Reviewing the company at the Besançon festival that August, the same paper described him as the new danseur étoile who had replaced Wladimir Skouratoff.

His roles in Geneva included the male lead in Golovine's Le Chant du pavot, to a score by Marcel Landowski with designs by Théodore Strawinsky; the toreador in Lichine's Corrida; and the Bluebird pas de deux in the company's first full-length The Sleeping Beauty, conducted by Armin Jordan in May 1967. In April 1967 he danced the Don Quixote pas de deux with Liliane Van de Velde at a gala marking the twentieth anniversary of the United Nations Economic Commission for Europe. In October 1967 he created the male role in Contraste, a dance poem on the opposition of man and woman set to a score by the Swiss composer Armin Schibler, first performed by Golovine's company with Polajenko as the Man and Beatriz Consuelo as the Woman.

By August 1967 the Geneva press listed him among the company's danseurs étoiles, its highest rank, alongside Beatriz Consuelo, Liliane Van de Velde and Golovine. In April 1968 he danced the Devil in Stravinsky and Ramuz's L'Histoire du soldat in choreography by Golovine. In June 1968 he appeared with the company on its first visit to Lausanne, at the Palais de Beaulieu.

Reviews were not uniformly favourable, and the Geneva papers differed sharply over him. Reviewing the opening programme of his first season, in which he had the lead in Le Chant du pavot, the Tribune de Genève dismissed him as "un nouveau venu n'offrant aucune qualité particulière" — a newcomer offering no particular quality — engaged with the title of étoile and "plus maniéré que léger", and argued that ensemble work was worth more than titles that corresponded to nothing. Writing in the Journal de Genève in May 1968, the critic Antoine Livio judged his Romeo in Les Amants de Vérone harshly, writing that he had been a fine dancer but that this was long ago and it showed. Germaine Soullier of the Courrier de Genève reached the opposite verdict on the role, calling him "un Roméo élégant, expressif et de belle allure" and describing him and Liliane Van de Velde as a well-matched pair who were partners throughout the season.

When the company opened its 1968–69 season under Ottavio Cintolesi and Nicholas Beriozoff, the Gazette de Lausanne reported that responsibility for training the dancers had passed to Beatriz Consuelo and Polajenko. The Neue Zürcher Zeitung reported that Golovine had left the company and the theatre only weeks before the season opened and that Consuelo had been unwell throughout the preparations, leaving the two of them to hold the company's technical standard. At the opening programme on 1 October 1968 Polajenko danced the Sea in the premiere of Cintolesi's Manu-Tara, to a prize-winning score by Jean Derbès.

=== Television ===
In September 1968 Polajenko and Liliane Van de Velde led the Geneva company in Michel Fokine's Les Sylphides on Télévision Suisse Romande. In 1971 he danced the title role in Maldoror, a television ballet after the Chants de Maldoror of Lautréamont, with an electronic score by Jean Derbès and choreography by Ottavio Cintolesi. It was first broadcast in May 1971 and again in April 1972.

== Teaching ==
Polajenko's teaching began before he left Switzerland. Having ended his engagement as danseur étoile at the close of 1968, he was called to Houston at the start of 1969 to organise a dance school funded by a private foundation. La Suisse reported his return to Geneva that February, where he took charge of classes at a beauty school: amateur classes in "gym-jazz", a method the paper credited him with originating, combining gymnastic exercise with jazz music, and which he had already taught to staff of the city's international organisations. He advertised classes in Geneva and at Meyrin through 1969 and 1970.

Polajenko and his second wife, the dancer Anne Saint-Pol, moved to the United States in 1973. He was assistant professor in the dance department at Point Park College in Pittsburgh, and was appointed ballet master of Houston Ballet in 1974, serving during the company's formative years under artistic director Nina Popova. From 1976 to 1988 he and his wife were co-artistic directors of the Houston Dance Center, which they founded in 1976 as a non-profit school at 2018 West Gray, premises the Houston Ballet had recently vacated. Classes began that September, with James Clouser as permanent guest teacher. Alongside technique the school taught dance history, music theory and dance journalism, an academic curriculum unusual for a private studio. Reviewing American schools that autumn, Dance Magazine wrote that the centre, "where Nicholas and Anne Polajenko and James Clouser head the faculty, offers a uniquely complete list of courses and activities in dance".

The school ran a performing arm, known variously as Festival Ballet/USA and the Houston Dance Center Ballet Company, through which students moved into professional work; by 1978 it was reported to have placed dancers in schools in New York and San Francisco. In June 1982 the company danced a programme of classical and modern work for Galveston Arts at the Grand 1894 Opera House in Galveston. The Polajenkos were also the ballet instructors for Theatre Under the Stars, Houston's free summer musical theatre company, and are credited as such in its printed programmes. In 1988 they were engaged as the first ballet faculty of the HARID Conservatory in Boca Raton, Florida.

== Personal life ==
Polajenko married the British dancer Daphne Dale, a fellow member of London's Festival Ballet, on 16 August 1954. He later married the dancer Anne Saint-Pol, whom he met at the Grand Théâtre de Genève; the Geneva civil register recorded their marriage on 8 April 1971. He died on 4 August 2015 in Florida.
