= Violette Verdy =

French ballet dancer, choreographer, and professor

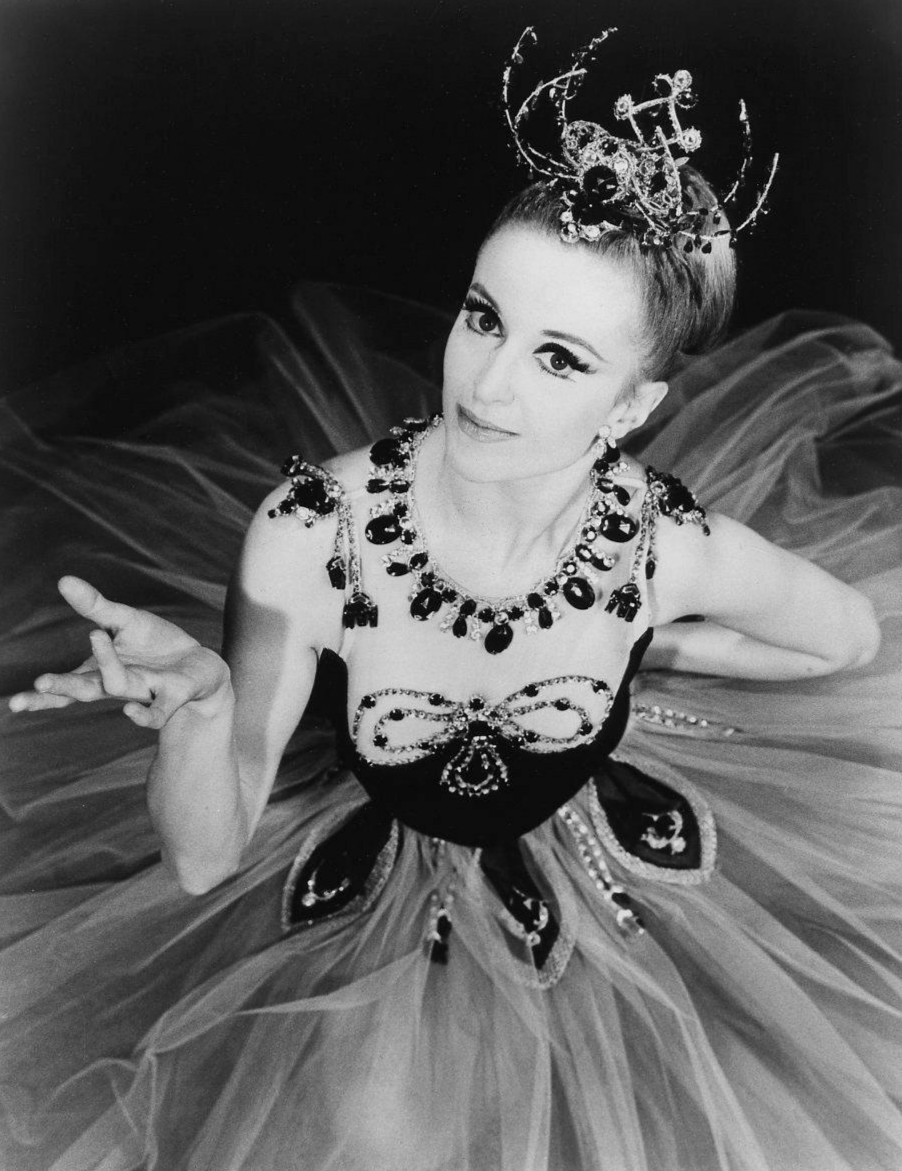
- Verdy in 1967
- Born: Nelly Armande-Guillerm; 1 December 1933; Pont-l'Abbé, France
- Died: 8 February 2016 (aged 82); Bloomington, Indiana, U.S.
- Education: Indiana University
- Occupations: Ballerina; choreographer; teacher; writer
- Spouse: Colin Clark (divorced)
- Awards: Legion of Honour - Knight (2008)

Violette Verdy (born Nelly Armande Guillerm; 1 December 1933 – 8 February 2016) was a French ballerina, choreographer, teacher, and writer who worked as a dance company director with the Paris Opera Ballet in France and the Boston Ballet in the United States. From 1958 to 1977 she was a principal dancer with the New York City Ballet, where she performed in the world premieres of several works created specifically for her by choreographers George Balanchine and Jerome Robbins. She was Distinguished Professor of Music (Ballet) at the Jacobs School of Music, Indiana University, in Bloomington, and the recipient of two medals from the French government.

== Early life in Europe ==
Born in Pont-l'Abbé, a seacoast town in the Finistère department of Brittany, in northwestern France, she was christened Nelly Armande Guillerm by her parents. Her father, Renan Guillerm, died when she was a few months old; her mother, Jeanne Chateaureynaud, a schoolteacher, enrolled her daughter in dance lessons because she seemed to have so much energy. Considered a prodigy, she began her ballet training at the age of eight, in 1942, during the German occupation of northern France, and moved with her mother (who sought the best possible teachers for her daughter) to Paris at the height of the German occupation. Following studies in Paris with Carlotta Zambelli and later with Madame Rousanne Sarkissian and Victor Gsovsky, she made her professional debut in 1945, in the corps de ballet of Roland Petit's Le Poète at the Théâtre Sarah-Bernhardt in Paris. Soon afterward, she became a member of Petit's Ballets des Champs-Élysées, where she appeared in numerous small roles over the next few years.

In 1949, Guillerm was chosen by German cinema director Ludwig Berger to star in his film Ballerina, released in Europe in 1950 and known in America as Dream Ballerina. Berger insisted she adopt a stage name, and Roland Petit suggested Violette Verdy, reminiscent of both a flower and the composer Giuseppe Verdi. Critical praise for her sincere acting and pure classical ballet technique won her contacts and contracts with several European ballet companies. She went on to dance with the reorganized Ballets des Champs-Élysées, the Ballet de Marigny, and Les Ballets de Paris de Roland Petit. With the last-named troupe, she created the role of the heroine of Petit's Le Loup (The Wolf, 1953), set to the music of Henri Dutilleux, which proved to be a significant turning point in her development as an interpretive artist. Widely recognized for her musicality, precision, and wit, she would thereafter tour the United States with Les Ballets de Paris (1953) and London Festival Ballet (1954–1955), appearing in leading roles with the ballet company of Teatro alla Scala (1955–1956) in Milan and with Ballet Rambert (1957) in London. With La Scala Ballet she danced the title roles in full-length productions of Cinderella and Romeo and Juliet, both choreographed for her by Alfred Rodrigues; with Ballet Rambert she danced the light-hearted Swanhilda in Coppélia and the more dramatic title role in Giselle, which became one of her signature roles.

== Dancing in America ==
A film made during the London Festival Ballet tour of America brought Verdy to the attention of Nora Kaye, a ballerina at American Ballet Theatre, which in 1957 led to an invitation to join that company. Verdy accepted the invitation and moved to New York City. With her new company she quickly charmed American audiences in such repertory works as Gala Performance and Offenbach in the Underworld, both created by Antony Tudor and both with a decidedly French flavor. She also gave brilliant performances in Theme and Variations, set to the final movement of Tchaikovsky's Suite No. 3 by George Balanchine, and a dramatic interpretation of the title role in Miss Julie, based on the 1888 play by August Strindberg and choreographed by Birgit Cullberg in 1950.

When American Ballet Theatre temporarily disbanded in 1958, Verdy was the only member invited to join New York City Ballet. Eager to work with George Balanchine, she promptly joined the company where, with rare exceptions, she would spend the next twenty years of her performing career. Although her French training and her petite physique set her apart from most female dancers in the company, she seemed to have an instinctive understanding of Balanchine's choreographic aesthetic; her quip that she feared sticking out "like a French poodle among a troupe of borzois" was widely circulated, but any personal anxiety was quickly dispelled by her well-received performances. She was soon dancing major roles in the repertory, giving dazzling performances in Allegro Brillante, Apollo, Divertimento No. 15, Scotch Symphony, Stars and Stripes, and Theme and Variations, often partnered by Edward Villella, who equaled her vivacity and technical aplomb on stage. Recognizing her musicality and kinesthetic intelligence, Balanchine created numerous parts for her over the years, including leading roles in Tschaikovsky Pas de Deux (1960), The Figure in the Carpet (1960), Liebeslieder Walzer (1960), A Midsummer Night's Dream (1962), Emeralds (1967), Glinkaiana (1967), La Source (1968), Pulcinella (1972), and Sonatine (1973).

Of all these roles, Verdy is perhaps most identified with Emeralds, the opening ballet of the triptych Jewels, and with Tschaikovsky Pas de Deux. Partnered with Conrad Ludlow in both these works, she embodied the Romantic spirit of Fauré's music in the former and the charm and effervescent joy of Tchaikovsky's music in the latter. Since its premiere, Tschaikovsky Pas de Deux has been performed by many ballerinas in numerous international companies, but few have come close to the musicality, wit, and technical bravura of Verdy's original interpretation.

Verdy was also favored by choreographer Jerome Robbins, who cast her in Dances at a Gathering (1969) and In the Night (1970), both set to piano music by Chopin. Her solo as 'the woman in green" in Dances at a Gathering, a showpiece of her extraordinary musicality set to a quick Chopin étude (op. 25, no.4), remains a challenge for ballerinas to this day. The choreography of In the Night, set to three Chopin nocturnes, allowed her to display the finest nuances of meaning in movement. Among other notable roles in Verdy's repertory was that of Creusa, the "other woman" in Birgit Cullberg's Medea, which entered the New York City Ballet repertory in 1958. As a guest artist, she appeared frequently in performances at the Metropolitan Opera House in New York and on tour. In productions mounted by England's Royal Ballet, the Paris Opera Ballet, and the Boston Ballet, she danced the ballerina roles in such classic works as Giselle, Swan Lake, La Sylphide, The Sleeping Beauty, and Coppélia. From 1949 onward, she was also often seen dancing on French, British, Canadian, and American television.

== Later life ==
In the 1960s, Verdy was briefly married to the writer and filmmaker Colin Clark. Verdy left New York City Ballet in 1977 to become the first female artistic director of the Paris Opera Ballet, an illustrious but notoriously bureaucratic organization. After three years there, a change in the French government administration led her to leave Paris and return to the United States in 1980. She then became associate director and later sole artistic director of the Boston Ballet, a post she held until 1984. Thereafter, she was engaged to head the faculty of the ballet program at the Jacobs School of Music at Indiana University.

Recognized as a gifted choreographer, Verdy mounted, after 1965, numerous works for American and European ballet companies. She was also internationally renowned as a teacher of ballet technique. In her classes and coaching sessions, she emphasized the joy of dancing over the rigors of routine, even as she maintained the purity of her technical instruction.

Among the companies with which she accepted guest teaching residencies were London's Royal Ballet, the Paris Opera Ballet, the Australian Ballet, the Royal Danish Ballet, the Teatro alla Scala, the Stuttgart Ballett, the Hamburg Ballett, the Bayeriches Staatsballett in Munich, and the Bolshoi Ballet in Moscow, where she became the first foreign teacher invited since the 1917 Revolution. In 2008, the School of American Ballet announced that Verdy would serve as their first, and, initially, only, permanent guest teacher.

Verdy died in Bloomington, Indiana on 8 February 2016, after a short illness.

== Honors and awards ==
Numerous awards and honors were bestowed on Verdy, including a 1968 Dance Magazine Award, the 2003 Artistic Achievements Award from the School of American Ballet, the 2005 Grand Prix Gold Medal at the International Ballet Festival of Miami, and the 2007 Irène Lidova Lifetime Achievement Award by Ballet2000, an international dance magazine. She was given a Doctor of Humane Letters by Skidmore College (1972) and Doctor of Arts from both Goucher College (1987) and Boston Conservatory (1997). Two honors were bestowed by the French government. In 1973, during her performing career, she was named a Chevalier dans l'Ordre des Arts et des Lettres; thirty-five years later, she was honored with the knight of France's Legion of Honour, presented in 2008.

== Selected writings ==
- Giselle, or The Wilis. With illustrations by Marcia Brown. New York: McGraw-Hill, 1970. A book for children.
- Giselle, a Role for a Lifetime. New York: Marcel Dekker, 1977. Includes the text of the ballet scenario adapted from Théophile Gautier.
- "Violette Verdy on the Bolshoi." Ballet Review 15 (Summer 1987) 15–38.
- Memoir by Violette Verdy, in I Remember Balanchine, compiled by Francis Mason. New York: Doubleday, 1991), pp. 424–430.
- Of Swans, Sugarplums, and Satin Sippers: Ballet Stories for Children. With illustrations by Marcia Brown. New York: Scholastic, 1991.
- Foreword, in Getting Started in Ballet: A Parent's Guide to Dance Education, by Anna Paskevska. New York: Dance Publishing / Oxford University Press, 1997.
- Rudolf Noureev à Paris. Paris: Éditions de la Martiniere, 2003. In French.

== Selected videography ==
- Violette: A Life in Dance. Boston: WGBH-TV, 1982. A Public Broadcasting Service documentary of her life and work.
- Violette et Mr. B. Paris: Films du Prieure, 2008. A documentary (2001) by Dominique Delouche, in French with English subtitles. Verdy is seen coaching dancers from the Paris Opera Ballet in roles created for her at New York City Ballet. Included are excerpts from Balanchine's Emeralds, Liebeslieder Walzer, Sonatine, and Tschaikovsky Pas de Deux and from Robbins's Dances at a Gathering and In the Night.
- Violette Verdy: The Artist Teacher at Chautauqua Institution. Video Artists International, 2009. A documentary focusing on Verdy's work with students at the Chautauqua School of Dance, directed by Jean-Pierre Bonnefoux and Patricia McBride. Verdy recounts highlights from her life and career. Includes rare video clips of performances.
- New York City Ballet in Montreal, Vol. 1. Video Artists International, 2014. Telecasts from Radio-Canada, 1958–1960. Includes a complete performance of Balanchine's Orpheus, with Nicholas Magallanes, Violette Verdy, Francisco Moncion, and others.
- New York City Ballet in Montreal, Vol. 2. Video Artists International, 2014. Telecasts from Radio-Canada, 1958–1960. Includes a complete performance of Balanchine's Agon, with Diana Adams, Violette Verdy, Jillana, Francia Russell, Todd Bolender, Arthur Mitchell, Richard Rapp, Roy Tobias, and others.

Under the auspices of the George Balanchine Foundation Video Archives, Verdy participated in recording six coaching sessions for the Interpreters Archive, which feature the creators of important Balanchine roles as they teach and coach the roles with dancers of today. With Conrad Ludlow, she can be seen coaching Tschaikovsky Pas de Deux (original version, 1960), the principal roles in Emeralds, and a pas de deux from the divertissement in act 2 of A Midsummer Night's Dream. With Helgi Tomasson, she was recorded coaching the principal roles in La Source and with Jean-Pierre Bonnefoux excerpts from Liebeslieder Walzer and Sonatine. Master tapes are housed in the Jerome Robbins Dance Division of the New York Public Library for the Performing arts, and copies are made available to research repositories around the world.

== See also ==
- Legion of Honour
- List of Legion of Honour recipients by name (V)
- Legion of Honour Museum
