= Verdy =

Verdy may refer to:

- Tokyo Verdy
- Violette Verdy (1933–2016), French ballerina
