= Nina Vyroubova =

Russian-born French ballerina

Nina Vladimirovna Vyroubova (Russian: Нина Владимировна Вырубова; 4 June 1921 – 25 June 2007) was a Russian-born French ballerina, considered one of the finest of her generation.

== Early life ==
She was born in Gurzuf, Crimea, but moved to Paris as a child with her grandmother and widowed mother, fleeing the Russian Revolution. Her first ballet teacher was her mother, followed by renowned Russian ballerinas Olga Preobrajenska, Vera Trefilova and Lyubov Yegorova.

In 1937, the 16-year-old Vyroubova made her debut in Caen as Swanilda in the comic ballet Coppélia. She performed with the Ballets Polonais (1939) and the Ballet Russe de Paris (1940). During her work in recitals staged by the French critic Irène Lidova from 1941 to 1944, she met the French choreographer, dancer and ballet company director Roland Petit. When Petit formed Les Ballets des Champs-Elysées in 1945, his breakthrough work, Les Forains, featured her. It was, however, a revival of the romantic ballet La Sylphide, with new choreography by Victor Gsovsky, that catapulted Vyroubova to stardom.

== Career ==
At the age of 18, Vyroubova joined the Paris Opera Ballet as a member of the corps de ballet. In 1949, Serge Lifar made her the Danseur Étoile ("star dancer", equivalent to prima ballerina) of the Paris Opera Ballet, succeeding Yvette Chauviré. She was featured in his productions of Suite en Blanc (1949), La Dame in Dramma Per Musica (1950), Giselle (1950), Blanche-Neige (Snow White, as the Wicked Queen) (1951), Les Noces Fantastiques (1955), Hamlet (1957) and L'Amour et son destin (1957). In 1957, when Lifar resigned from the Paris Opera Ballet, she followed him to the Grand Ballet du Marquis de Cuevas touring company, where she starred in George Balanchine’s La sonnambula. When Rudolf Nureyev defected in 1961, she was paired with him in The Sleeping Beauty in his first post-defection performance. However, she became furious when he added some impromptu extra steps to his final solo, and she refused to speak to him for five years. After the Grand Ballet du Marquis de Cuevas disbanded in 1962, she continued to work freelance. In 1965, a role was created especially for her in the Hamburg Ballet's Abraxis.

After her retirement, she taught in Paris and later in Troyes (1983-1988). She died in Paris at the age of 86.

== Personal life ==
Nina Vyroubova was married three times (one of her husbands was Arkadij Kniaseff) and had a son, dancer Yura Kniazeff (born 1951, a soloist with the National Ballet of Canada).

Vyroubova appeared in a number of documentaries, including the 1996 Les cahiers retrouvés de Nina Vyroubova (The Rediscovered Notebooks of Nina Vyroubova).
