= Ivanna Lemaître =

Russian painter and mosaicist active in France

- Born: 1893; Saint Petersburg, Russia
- Died: 1973 (aged 79–80); Nice, France
- Known for: Painter and mosaicist

Ivanna Lemaître (1893–1973) was a Russian painter and mosaicist.

== Early life ==
Lemaître was born in Saint Petersburg, Russia and died in Nice, France. She was exiled to Paris during the Bolshevik Revolution in 1917. She studied to become a painter and mosaicist in Montmartre, Rue de la Chaumière.

== Career ==
She married André Hubert Lemaître, a prominent artist in fresco painting and often worked side by side with him to fulfill commissions from Parisian patrons and state orders. Their most renowned frescos include work from the church of Meudon (1927), the salon of Marechal Lyautey at the Colonial Exhibition of 1931, and at the Palace of the Golden Door (Palais de la Porte Dorée).

During the German occupation of France in WWII, Lemaître moved to the French Riviera. She worked along the coast from Cannes to Monaco painting portraits of her friends Jean Cocteau, Andre Gide, Francois Mauriac and Serge Lifar, and other French writers and artists.

Ivanna Lemaître was buried in a Russian cemetery in Nice, France.

== Style and motifs ==
Lemaitre's style includes media such as mosaic, ink, oil, and watercolor. Her frequent subjects were villages and chapels in the country, views of the Mediterranean and mythology.

Asian myths and religious teachings about the Buddha, Krishna, and Confucius are common motifs in her work. Her panels would include scenes from the lives of these figures along with the music, theater, and culture of the Far East. Lemaître drew upon non-Christian religions little understood by the European public. She often referring to the "inscrutable Orient" in her paintings. She incorporated images of the primordial elements fire, water, and earth, all celebrated in Asian beliefs.

Frescoes by the Lemaîtres showcased a pantheon of oriental figures on the walls which gave the contributions of the Far East a full, relatively accurate description compared to the Orientalist conventions adopted by painters such as Delacroix, Ingres, and Renoir. The Lemaîtres sought to present Eastern religion without the typical, exotic symbols or excessive stylization of Art Deco.

== Principal works ==
- 1925 : Monastery of the Recollets in Toulouse
- 1927 : Church of Meudon (faces of Jean Cocteau, Jacques Maritain)
- 1931 : Salon of Maréchal Lyautey for the Colonial Exposition, Porte Dorée
- 1935 : Frescoes for the scholar group Davout in Paris
- 1937 : Face of the pavillon of the Maroquinerie Française de l'Exposition Universelle in 1937, Paris
- 1937 : Maroufle canvases for the School of Arts and Works in Paris
- 1962 : Sanctuary of Sacré-Coeur in Nice : monumental fresco in mosaic (50 square meters) ornamenting the triumphal arc
- 1963 : Two mosaics in hommage to Jean Médecin and Jean Cocteau at La Porte Fausse, Vieux-Nice
- 1965 : Mosaics for the Savings Bank of Nice
- 1968 : Panels in mosaic for a school in Arles
- 1968 : Mosaics ornamenting the face of the gym of Eucalyptus in Nice
- 1973 : School of Drancy, mural decorations completed by her son Jean Lemaître after her death.
- Mosaics for multiple buildings in Nice, notably the Centenaire and the Michelet.
