= Milorad Mišković =

Serbian ballet dancer and choreographer

Milorad Mišković, also Milorad Miskovitch (Serbian Cyrillic: Милорад Мишковић, pronounced [mîlorad mîʃkoʋitɕ]) (born 26 March 1928 in Valjevo, Kingdom of Serbs, Croats and Slovenes, died 21 June 2013 in Nice, France) was a Serbian ballet dancer and choreographer.

== Biography ==
Mišković took ballet lessons first in Belgrade. His emigration to France in 1947 made him a persona non grata in Yugoslavia, but has also made possible for him to show the world his class, that has later earned him the title of one of the greatest ballet dancers in the world in the 1950s. In Paris, he studied under Olga Preobrajenska. Later, Mišković joined International Ballet in England, and started performing in the big cities in Europe. After that, he joined De Basil Company, and later, Grand Ballet du Marquis de Cuevas, the successor of International Ballet. With Grand Ballet, Mišković toured around the world. He starred alongside famous ballerinas such as Lycette Darsonval, Yvette Chauviré, and Janine Charrat. He partnered Alicia Markova in ballet recitals at the height of her career.

His greatest successes include the roles of Prometheus, Don Juan, Tristan, Hamlet, and Orestês. He has worked with some of the most famous artists of his time, such as choreographer Serge Lifar, opera singer Maria Callas, as well as the world's most prominent ballerinas of his time, such as Zizi Jeanmaire, Yvette Chauviré, Margot Fonteyn and Alicia Markova. In 1956, he founded his own company, which continued to tour for ten years. In 1966, Mišković performed in Yugoslavia for the first time after his emigration.

Since the end of his professional career, he began to work with UNESCO, first as an art director, and later he became the honorary president of UNESCO International Dance Council.

In 2009, Serbian director Ivan Jovanović made a film about Mišković's 60 years long professional career, entitled A Leap into the infinity.

Mišković was married to Nita-Carol Cervin.
