= Conrad Ludlow =

American ballet dancer

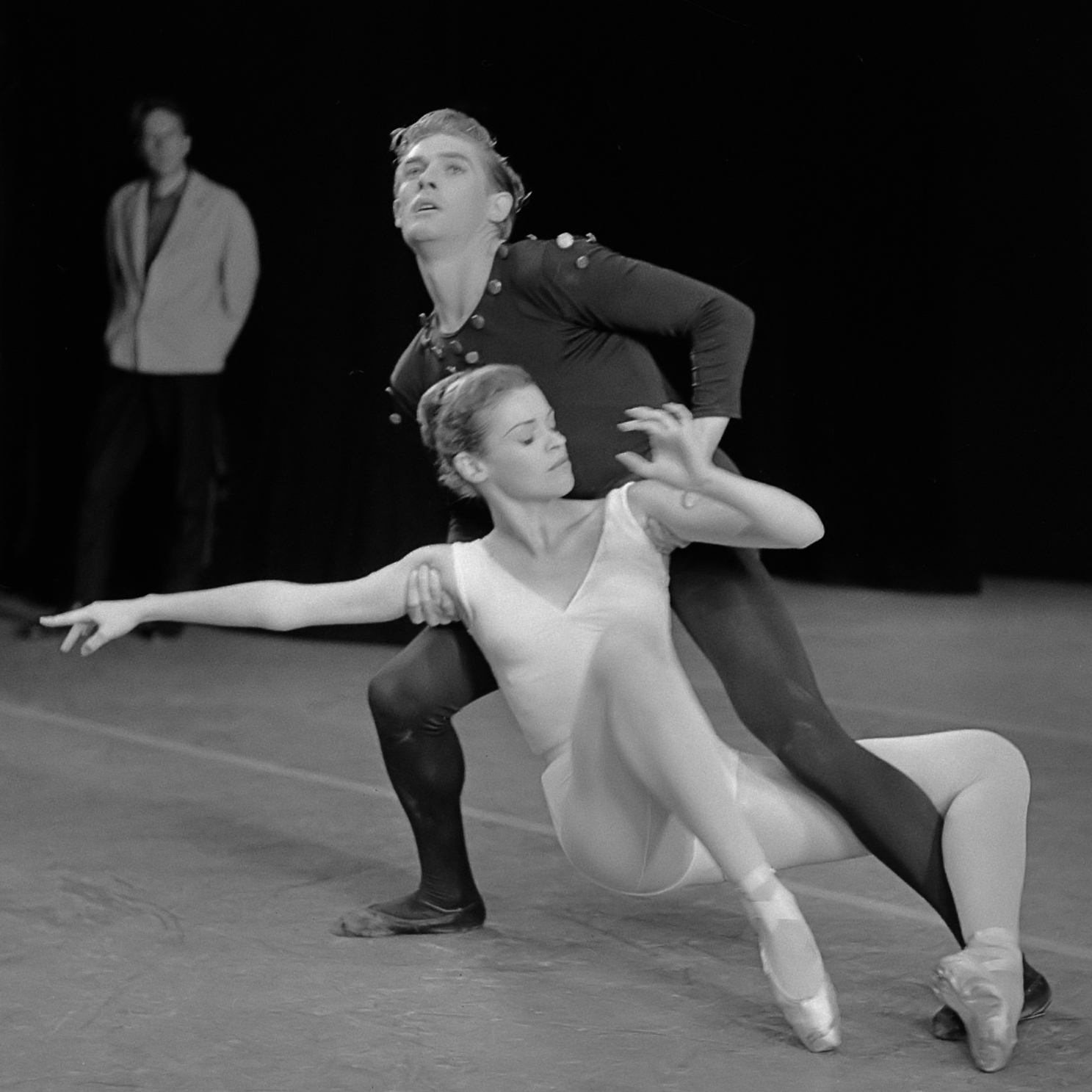
Patricia Neary and Conrad Ludlow (1965)

Conrad Ludlow is a former principal dancer with New York City Ballet under George Balanchine. He also danced at San Francisco Ballet and founded and directed Ballet Oklahoma (now Oklahoma City Ballet). He is currently a professor at the University of Utah's ballet department. Several of Balanchine's works were created on Ludlow, including Emeralds, Tschaikovsky Pas de Deux and A Midsummer Night's Dream. Ludlow partnered such dancers as Allegra Kent and Violette Verdy while at New York City Ballet.
