= Patricia Neary =

American ballet dancer, director

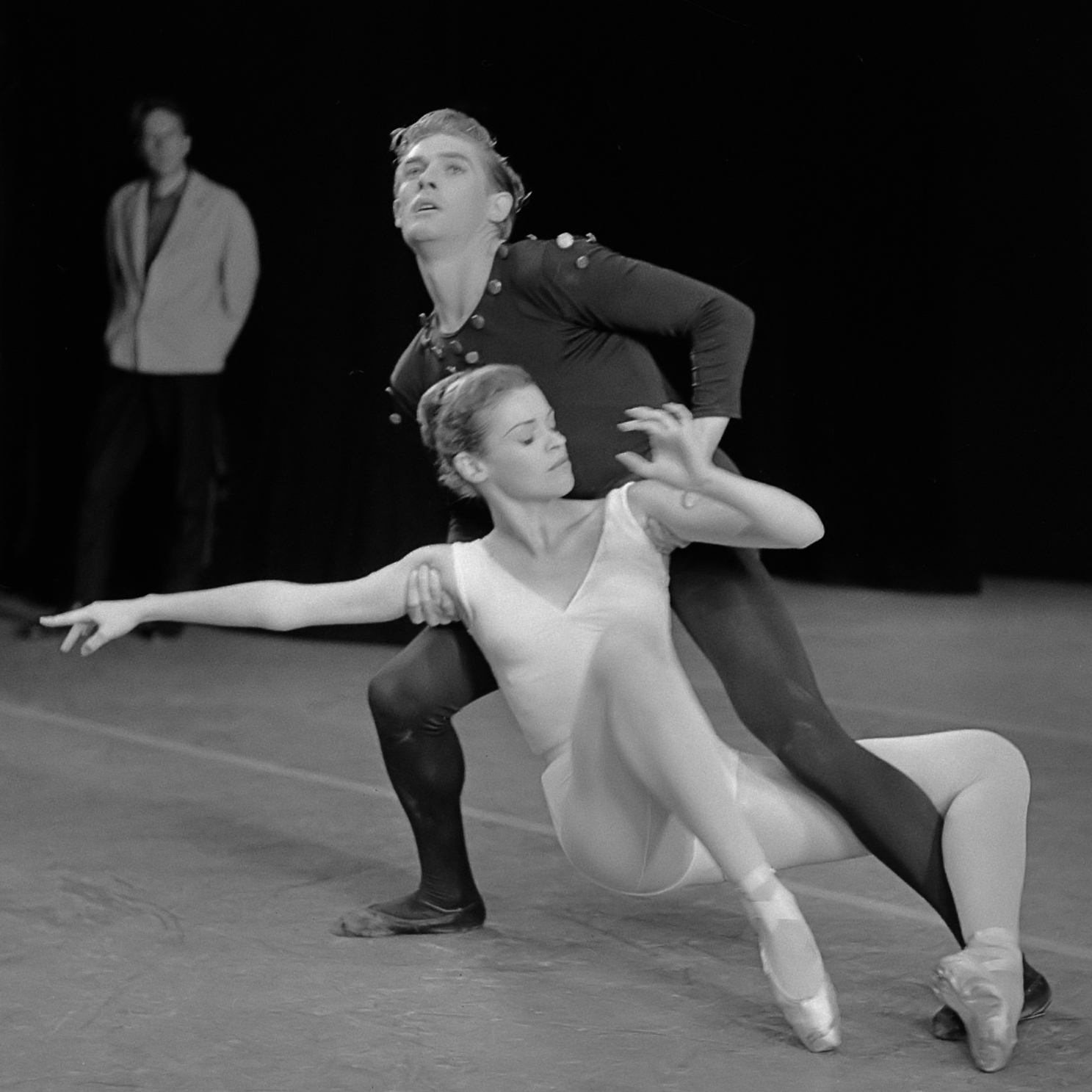
Patricia Neary and Conrad Ludlow (1965)

Patricia Neary (born October 27, 1942) is an American ballerina, choreographer and ballet director, who has been particularly active in Switzerland. She has also been an ambassador for the Balanchine Trust, bringing George Balanchine's ballets to 60 cities around the globe.

== Biography ==
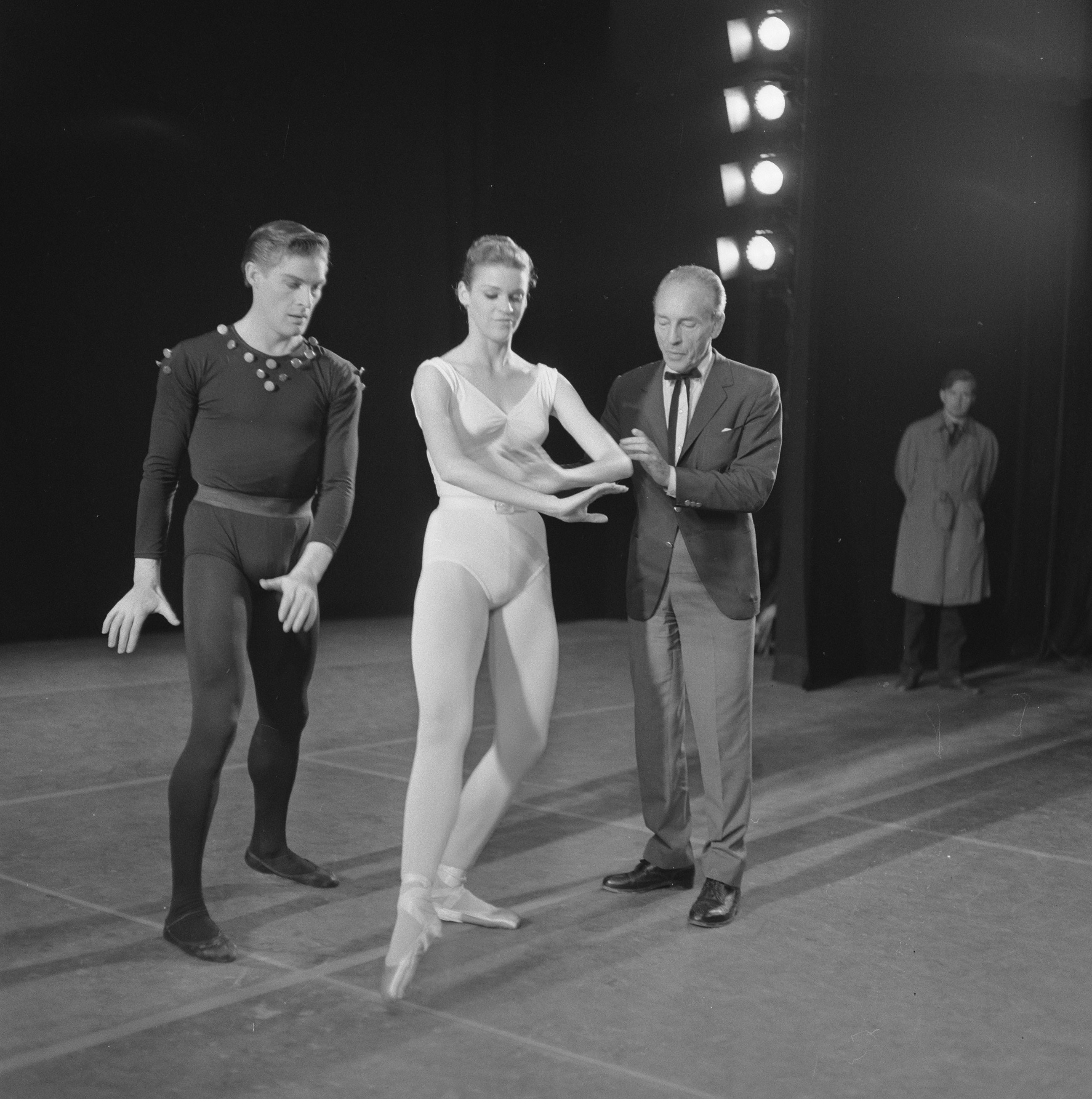
With George Balanchine and Conrad Ludlow (Amsterdam, 1965)

Born in Miami, Florida, she first studied there under George Milenoff and Thomas Armour until she attended the School of American Ballet in New York.

At the age of 14, she joined the National Ballet of Canada as the youngest dancer in the company. In 1960, she became a member of the New York City Ballet where she performed almost all the ballerina roles in George Balanchine's major works, including two roles he created specially for her in Raymonda Variations (1961) and Jewels (1967). She also performed leading roles in ballets by Jerome Robbins, Antony Tudor, John Taras and Merce Cunningham.

In 1968, she joined the Geneva Ballet where she performed in and staged Balanchine's ballets. She also made guest appearances in Stuttgart, Hamburg and Hannover. She worked as assistant ballet mistress with the ballet of the Deutsche Oper Berlin from 1970 to 1973. With Balanchine acting as artistic advisor, she was appointed director of ballet at the Grand Théâtre de Genève (1973–78). From 1978 to 1985, she served as ballet director of the Zurich Ballet, then of La Scala in Milan (1986–87). As artistic director of Ballet British Columbia (1989–90), she choreographed Variations Concertantes with music by Alberto Ginastera.

Since 1988, she has worked as an ambassador for the Balanchine Trust, bringing his works to about 60 cities in Europe, the Far East and across the United States.
