= Patricia Wilde =

Canadian ballet dancer (1928–2021)

- Born: July 16, 1928; Ottawa, Ontario, Canada
- Died: July 17, 2021 (aged 93)
- Occupations: Prima ballerina, dance teacher
- Career
- Former groups: National Ballet of Canada

Patricia Wilde (July 16, 1928 – July 17, 2021) was a Canadian-born ballerina and dance instructor. She was a principal ballerina of New York City Ballet, where she danced every major role in the repertoire, many of them created especially for her by George Balanchine. Following her retirement from NYCB, she became a famed ballet mistress and teacher. In 1982, she was appointed artistic director of Pittsburgh Ballet Theatre where she served until 1997. She is a recipient of the Dance Magazine Award and the 56th Inductee into the National Museum of Dance Hall of Fame. Her biography Wilde Times: Patricia Wilde, George Balanchine and the Rise of New York City Ballet, by Joel Lobenthal was published in 2015 by the University Press of New England.

== Early life and career ==
Born Patricia Lorrain-Ann White in Ottawa, Ontario, Canada, Wilde was raised with her two older sisters on their single mother's rugged family estate until its land was appropriated by the Canadian government. At 13, she came to New York City with her sister Nora to study at the School of American Ballet. She began her career a year later with American Concert Ballet and went on to perform with International Ballet of the Marquis de Cuevas, and Ballet Russe de Monte Carlo where she remained as principal dancer for four years during which time she worked extensively with George Balanchine, who was serving as the Ballets Russes' chief choreographer at the time.

Following Balanchine's departure, Wilde took off to further her ballet study in Europe. While there she spent a year working with Ballet Roland Petit and Ballet Metropolitan of England before being recruited by Balanchine in 1950 to join his newly formed New York City Ballet. At City Ballet, emboldened by the fact that "I can ask her to do anything", Balanchine created over 18 original roles for her, including the Highland Girl in Scotch Symphony, the Pas de Trois in Swan Lake, and Glinka Pas de Trois, Square Dance, Waltz-Scherzo, Native Dancers, and Raymonda Variations. As a star, Wilde toured with the company internationally to critical acclaim on the stages of the world's legendary theaters: the Bolshoi, the Kirov, La Scala, Covent Garden, and the Paris Opera as well as in the Philippines, Japan, and Australia.

Wilde left City Ballet in 1965 to start a family though she remained active in dance as a teacher and coach. That same year, she was invited by Rebecca Harkness to become the director of the Harkness Ballet School. She left Harkness to teach at the School of American Ballet and at the request of Balanchine, to assist him in forming the school of Ballet de Grand Théâtre de Genève. In 1969 she was appointed ballet mistress and company teacher for American Ballet Theatre and then the director of its school. While directing the school at ABT, Wilde molded the early careers of Cynthia Harvey, Susan Jaffe, Gregory Osborne, Peter Fonseca, and Lawrence Pech. Acknowledged as one of the first to achieve and conquer the blistering speed which Balanchine demanded in his works, Wilde's teaching was considered essential to understanding his style.

In 1982, she was recruited as the artistic director of Pittsburgh Ballet Theatre, the fourth director in the company's history. During her time at PBT she expanded the repertoire to include the works of Balanchine, Fokine, Tudor, Nijinska, Ashton, Paul Taylor, and the 19th-century classics. Additionally she grew the company's school and financial coffers, established a dancer retirement fund, oversaw the building of new headquarters, and nurtured the choreographic career of Ohad Naharin. Wilde stepped down as PBT's director in 1997. She served as a highly regarded master teacher around the world.

== Awards and recognition ==
In 2013, in recognition of "her invaluable work as an educator, dancer and director" Wilde was awarded the Dance Magazine Award. On August 3, 2016, she was officially inducted into the Mr. and Mrs. Cornelius Vanderbilt Whitney Dance Hall of Fame, in Saratoga Springs, New York.

== Personal life ==
Wilde met George Bardyguine, a technical director and stage manager for dance from Moscow, while on tour with New York City Ballet in Spain in 1952. After marrying, they had one daughter and one son. They remained married until Bardyguine's death at 74 in 1994. Wilde died on July 17, 2021.
