= Daphne Dale =

British ballet dancer (1931–1982)

- Born: July 18, 1932; Nairobi, Kenya
- Died: July 9, 1982 (aged 49); New Orleans, Louisiana, U.S.
- Other names: Daphne Dayle, Daphne Polajenko, Daphne Edmonds
- Occupation(s): Ballet dancer, film actress, burlesque performer

Daphne Dale (18 July 1932 – 9 July 1982), sometimes seen as Daphné Dayle, was a British ballet dancer born in Kenya. She was a member of the London Festival Ballet, the Harkness Ballet, and the Grand Ballet du Marquis de Cuevas, and appeared in the Gene Kelly film Invitation to Dance (1956). She also starred in French films in the 1960s.

== Early life ==
Dale was born on 18 July 1932 in Nairobi, Kenya, the daughter of British parents Joseph Dale and Enid Button Dale. Initially trained as a dancer in Kenya, she moved to London at age 14, to study under Grace Cone and Olive Ripman.

== Career ==
Dale and a number of other dancers from the Cone-Ripman school joined the newly formed Festival Ballet, founded by Alicia Markova and Anton Dolin, in 1949. Dale was with the Festival Ballet from 1951 to 1955. She later joined the Grand Ballet du Marquis de Cuevas. She was a member of the Harkness Ballet in the 1960s, and later a teacher at the Geneva Opera Ballet. She had a role in the "Ring around the Rosy" segment of the Gene Kelly film Invitation to the Dance (1956).

On the London stage, Dale danced in productions of Beau Danube (1950 and 1951), Petrouchka (1950), Giselle (1950 and 1951), Where the Rainbow Ends (1950–1951), Harlequinade (1950–1951), Symphonic Impressions (1951), Swan Lake (1951), The Nutcracker (1951), Schéhérazade (1952), Prince Igor (1952), Concerto grosso en ballet (1952), Noir et planc (1958), Constantia (1958), and Le mal du siècle (1958). She toured with the London Festival Ballet in the United States in 1954, dancing in Les Sylphides and Prince Igor.

In the early 1970s, Dayle starred in Mon Paris Amour, a "titillating" burlesque revue in Miami. She was a horse trainer in her last eight years.

== Films ==
As Daphné Dayle, she appeared in several French-language films in the 1960s.

- Jeff Gordon, Secret Agent (1964)
- Let the Shooters Shoot (1964)
- License to Kill (1964)

== Personal life ==
Dale married another Festival Ballet dancer, American-born Nicholas Polajenko, while they were appearing in Los Angeles in 1954. She married again in 1971, in Florida, to William "Beau" Edmonds, and petitioned for United States citizenship in 1975. Daphne Dale and her second husband died in the 1982 crash of Pan Am Flight 759 in New Orleans, Louisiana; she was 49 years old.
