= Marina Olenina =

- Марина Петровна Оленина
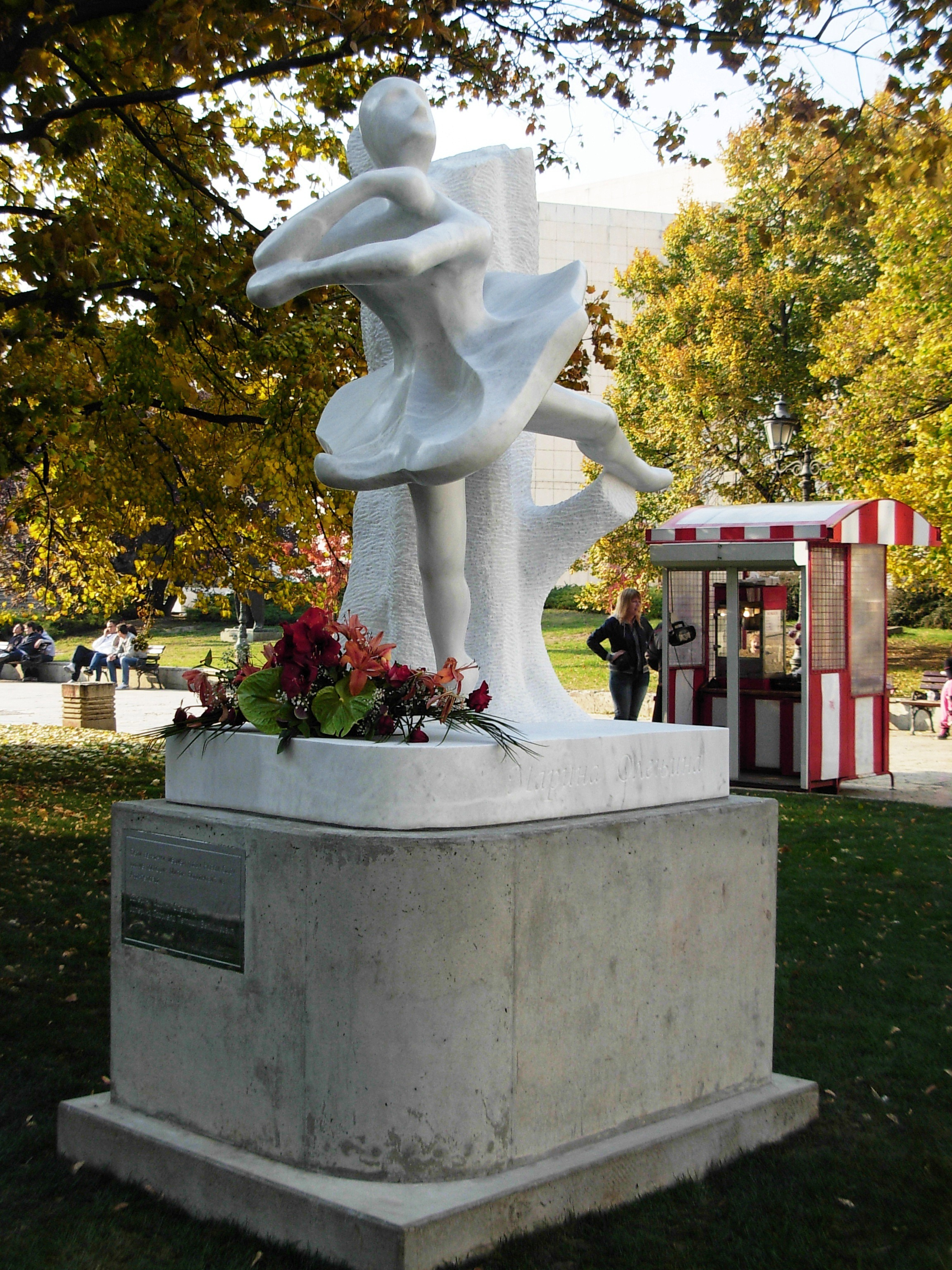
- The Monument to Marina Olenina in Novi Sad
- Born: Marina Petrovna Olenina; 15 April 1901; Moscow, Russia
- Died: 2 June 1963 (aged 62); Belgrade, Yugoslavia
- Occupations: Ballerina, choreographer, ballet master
- Years active: 1909–1961
- Organization(s): Serbian National Theatre, National Theatre in Belgrade
- Spouse: Vuk Dragović

Marina Olenina (Russian: Мари́на Петро́вна Оле́нина; married name Dragović; 15 April [O.S. 2 April] 1901 – 2 June 1963) was a Russian and Yugoslav ballerina, choreographer and ballet teacher. A niece of the renowned theatre practitioner Konstantin Stanislavski, she was the founder of the ballet at the Serbian National Theatre in Novi Sad.

== Biography ==
She was born into a family of opera singers, Pyotr Sergeyevich Olenin and Maria Sergeyevna Alexeyeva. Marina belonged to the ancient Russian noble Olenin family; on her maternal side, she was a niece of the prominent theatre director Konstantin Stanislavski (born Alexeyev). From her childhood, she studied ballet and received her professional education at the Moscow Imperial Ballet School. Olenina's first performances on the stage of The Bolshoi Theatre took place during her student years; notably, in 1909, she participated in a production of the ballet The Little Humpbacked Horse.

In the early 1920s, the ballerina emigrated from Russia. For some time, she stayed in Berlin, where she met with Konstantin Stanislavski during the Moscow Art Theatre's foreign tours. In 1923, she received an invitation to join the ballet of the National Theatre in Belgrade as a soloist and moved to Yugoslavia. In Belgrade, Olenina performed leading roles in classical productions such as Swan Lake, The Sleeping Beauty, Raymonda, Petrushka, and Francesca da Rimini, as well as in works by Yugoslav composers, including The Gingerbread Heart by Krešimir Baranović.

In Belgrade, Marina married Vuk Dragović, who organized tours for Russian artists in Yugoslavia, including performances by Fyodor Chaliapin in 1934.

From 1931 to 1933, the ballerina spent time in Paris, studying under famous ballet masters Mathilda Kschessinska, Olga Preobrajenska, and Léonide Massine. In the 1934/1935 season, Marina Olenina was officially joined the ballet of the National Theatre in Belgrade with the status of prima ballerina. On her personal initiative, the Russian dancer and teacher Boris Kniaseff, with whom she had previously studied in Paris, was invited to lead the ballet. Critics of the time described Olenina as a "tragic heroine of ballet," noting her monumental style, intellectual approach to roles, and mastery in character and dramatic parts. Olenina's professional career at the National Theatre was marked by repeated disagreements with the administration. In April 1935, due to a sharp conflict with the theatre's director, Branislav Vojinović, she terminated her contract and left the stage until the end of the season. Marina returned to the theatre for the 1936/1937 season as a soloist. During the 1937–1939 seasons, she actively participated in productions by guest choreographers: Elizaveta Nikolska, Pino and Pia Mlakar, and Anatolij Žukovski. In 1939, Olenina left the theatre again, considering the offered contract beneath her professional level. She returned to the theater only for the 1940/1941 season, which was interrupted by the bombing of Belgrade in April 1941.

During World War II, the ballerina took an active part in the Yugoslav partisan movement. Starting in April 1941, her apartment was used for clandestine meetings of communist underground members, which were attended by Josip Broz Tito. Due to the risk of arrest, Olenina moved to Montenegro, but she was captured during the Italian occupation and remained in custody from mid-1941 until September of the same year. After her release, she continued to cooperate with the anti-fascist underground. She also served as a nurse in a partisan detachment in Montenegro.

In January 1945, she returned to liberated Belgrade and choreographed the first post-war production at the National Theatre. During the post-war period, she and her husband traveled to Prague and Paris, where she continued her work as a ballet master and collaborated with emigrant dance companies.

Upon her return to Yugoslavia, Marina Olenina-Dragović was admitted to the Artistic Ensemble of the Central House of the Yugoslav Army in Belgrade, where she served as director and choreographer from 1946 to 1950. Using the ensemble's folklore group as a foundation, she began to form a future classical company. Following the disbandment of the army ensemble in March 1950, Olenina moved to Novi Sad with a group of 24 dancers. Based on this collective, the ballet of the Serbian National Theatre was officially established on 8 March 1950. Marina Olenina became its first director, ballet teacher and choreographer. The newly formed company's first production was the ballet Scheherazade, set to the music of Nikolai Rimsky-Korsakov and choreographed by Olenina, which premiered on 25 May 1950.

In the 1950s, she focused on her work as a choreographer, staging productions such as Romeo and Juliet, Night on Bald Mountain, and Mephisto Waltz. Thanks to her efforts as a choreographer and teacher, an entire generation of ballet dancers and soloists was trained at the Serbian National Theatre.

During the final two years of her life, she withdrew from active creative work due to failing health. She died in Belgrade in 1963. She was buried at the New Cemetery in Belgrade.

== Legacy ==
- Marina Olenina Award – In 2007, the Association of Ballet Artists of Vojvodina established the professional Marina Olenina Award for outstanding contributions to the field of ballet. The award is presented annually on 25 May, the day of the ballet of the Serbian National Theatre. The first recipient of the award was the ballerina Gabriela Teglaši.
- Monument in Novi Sad – On 25 October 2011, in honor of the 60th anniversary of the ballet of the Serbian National Theatre, a monument to Marina Olenina was unveiled on Theatre Square (Pozorišni trg) in Novi Sad. The installation of the monument was initiated by the theatre's soloist, Gabriela Teglaši. The white marble sculpture by László Szilágyi depicts the ballerina in a dance pose.
