= Colin Clark (filmmaker) =

British writer and filmmaker (1932–2002)

The Honourable Colin Clark
- Born: 9 October 1932; London, England, UK
- Died: 17 December 2002 (aged 70); London, England, UK
- Occupations: Writer and filmmaker
- Spouse(s): Violette Verdy (divorced); Faith Shuckburgh; Helena Siu Kwan
- Parent(s): Kenneth Clark; Elizabeth Martin
- Relatives: Alan Clark (brother)

Colin Clark (9 October 1932 – 17 December 2002) was a British writer and filmmaker who specialised in films about the arts, for cinema and television.

== Family and early life ==
He was the son of the art historian Kenneth Clark, and the younger brother of the Conservative politician and military historian Alan Clark, with whom he was not always on good terms. Edith Wharton was his godmother.

Born in London, he was educated at Eton College and Christ Church, Oxford. From 1951 to 1953, he did national service as a pilot officer in the Royal Air Force. In that capacity, he flew the Handley Page Hastings aircraft to Malaya and the Middle East.

== Relationship with Marilyn Monroe ==
Colin Clark's first job on leaving university was as a personal assistant on the film The Prince and the Showgirl (1957), directed by Laurence Olivier and starring Olivier and Marilyn Monroe, an experience Clark later turned into two books – The Prince, the Showgirl and Me and My Week with Marilyn – the former a set of diaries (a TV documentary version of which was also made in 2004) and the latter a memoir of his relationship with Monroe. Clark's period with Monroe is the basis of the 2011 film My Week with Marilyn, where he is portrayed by Eddie Redmayne.

== Working with Laurence Olivier ==
He went on to work with Olivier on The Entertainer, Titus Andronicus and other British stage productions. In January 1958, he agreed to be bound over, having been rounded up in a police raid on John Aspinall's illicit gaming house.

== Life in New York City ==
He then worked for Granada Television in Manchester, initially as a floor manager and later as assistant to studio boss Denis Forman and then head of design. Moving to New York in 1960, he was involved in setting up a PBS educational television station, Channel 13 New Jersey, with the aim of covering arts and culture in the New York region. He made a series of programmes called Art: New York, and recorded live concerts by Thelonious Monk and Sonny Rollins.

== Documentary filmmaker ==
Clark returned to Britain in 1965 to work for Associated Television (ATV), where he made many documentary films, including series with Angus Wilson and Bernard Levin, as well as directing a series on art appreciation presented by his father, Sir Kenneth Clark, who had fallen out with the BBC. After leaving ATV in 1971 to work as an independent film producer, he made further cultural documentary films for various commercial sponsors and for the Getty Museum as well as a film in which Alistair Cooke interviewed Prince Charles. Although much of this work was for the American market, he ran the operation partly from London because costs there were lower and because, he said, there was little American tradition or experience of making documentary films.

== Marriages ==
Clark was married three times. His first brief marriage was to prima ballerina Violette Verdy in the 1960s. Their marriage ended in divorce. His second marriage, to Faith Shuckburgh (née Wright), daughter of Beatrice Wright and ex-wife of Julian Shuckburgh, lasted nine years. At 50 he married Helena Siu Kwan, daughter of Cheung Wan Li of Hong Kong, and they had a son Christopher Ming Clark (b. 1986).

== Retirement and death ==
He retired from filmmaking in 1987 to live in Hammersmith and write books. He died in December 2002, age 70 in London, and was survived by his third wife and their son, and a stepson from his second marriage, Ben Shuckburgh.
