= Raymonda Variations =

Ballet by George Balanchine

- Choreographer: George Balanchine
- Music: Alexander Glazunov
- Premiere: December 7, 1961; City Center of Music and Drama
- Original ballet company: New York City Ballet
- Design: Karinska; David Hays
- Created for: Patricia Wilde; Jacques d'Amboise

Raymonda Variations, formerly titled Valses et Variations, is a ballet choreographed by George Balanchine to excepts from Alexander Glazunov's score for the 1898 ballet Raymonda. Instead of following the plot of the 1898 ballet, the Balanchine ballet is plotless. It premiered on December 7, 1961, at the City Center of Music and Drama. Raymonda Variations was made for the New York City Ballet, with the two lead roles originated by Patricia Wilde and Jacques d'Amboise.

== Choreography ==
Raymonda Variations is danced by two principal dancers, a man and a woman, and ensemble of twelve women. The ballet does not follow the plot of the 1898 Raymonda. Balanchine explained, "The music itself, its grand and generous manner, its joy and playfulness, was for me more than enough to carry the plot of the dances." He described the ballet,

When the curtain goes up, twelve girls stand posing in an elegant garden. They dance for us and then the principals, another girl then a boy, join them. Next, the girl and the boy are alone for an adagio. This is followed by a series of nine variations, or solos, by five of the girls and the two principals. The ballet concludes with a coda and a finale by all the dancers.

== Background and production ==
The 1898 ballet Raymonda featured choreography by Marius Petipa and a score by Alexander Glazunov. In the ballet, the titular character is engaged to Jean de Brienne, a French knight. However, while Jean leaves to fight at the Crusades, Raymonda is abducted by emir Abderakhman, but was saved by Jean, who Raymonda soon marries.

In his book Balanchine's Complete Stories of the Great Ballets, the choreographer wrote that he had enjoyed the score since he was a student, and whilst studying at the Imperial Ballet School, he performed the ballet at the Mariinsky Theatre, wearing the original costumes. In 1946, he and Alexandra Danilova staged a production of Raymonda for Ballet Russe de Monte-Carlo. In 1955, he used excerpts from the music of Raymonda for his ballet Pas de Dix.

In fall 1961, Balanchine decided to make another ballet to musical excerpts from Raymonda, with Patricia Wilde and Jacques d'Amboise. This would become the last time Balanchine choreograph a ballet on Wilde, who by then was one of the most senior dancers at the New York City Ballet. Wilde had also danced in the 1946 Raymonda. Balanchine began choreographing the ballet after the company's domestic tour that year, when Balanchine called Wilde to the studio, and choreograph a solo on her to music intended for a variation danced by Raymonda's companion Henriette. As Wilde did not know it was for a new ballet, she soon forgot about it. Weeks later, once rehearsals for the ballet officially started, Balanchine rechoreographed the solo. Balanchine also chose five young women in the company to dance other solos.

The costumes were designed by Karinska, and the original lighting was by David Hays. The backdrop Horace Armistead designed for Tudor's Jardin aux lilas was reused. The ballet originally used the working title Raymonda, before premiering under the title Valse et Variations. It was renamed Raymonda Variations in 1963.

== Original cast ==
The principal dancers in the original cast were:

- Patricia Wilde
- Jacques d'Amboise
- Victoria Simon
- Suki Schorer
- Gloria Govrin
- Carol Summer
- Patricia Neary

== Performances ==
The ballet premiered on December 7, 1961, at the City Center of Music and Drama. At the premiere, d'Amboise's variations were omitted as he was injured. They were added back to the ballet a month later.

Other ballet companies that have performed Raymonda Variations include Houston Ballet, Miami City Ballet, Kansas City Ballet, and Pittsburgh Ballet Theatre.

== Critical reception ==
Following the premiere, New York Times critic John Martin called the ballet a "an adorable confection, concocted of marzipan, diamonds, youth and nostalgia."
