= Nina Tikhonova =

Russian-French ballet dancer and dance teacher (1910–1995)

- Нина Тихонова
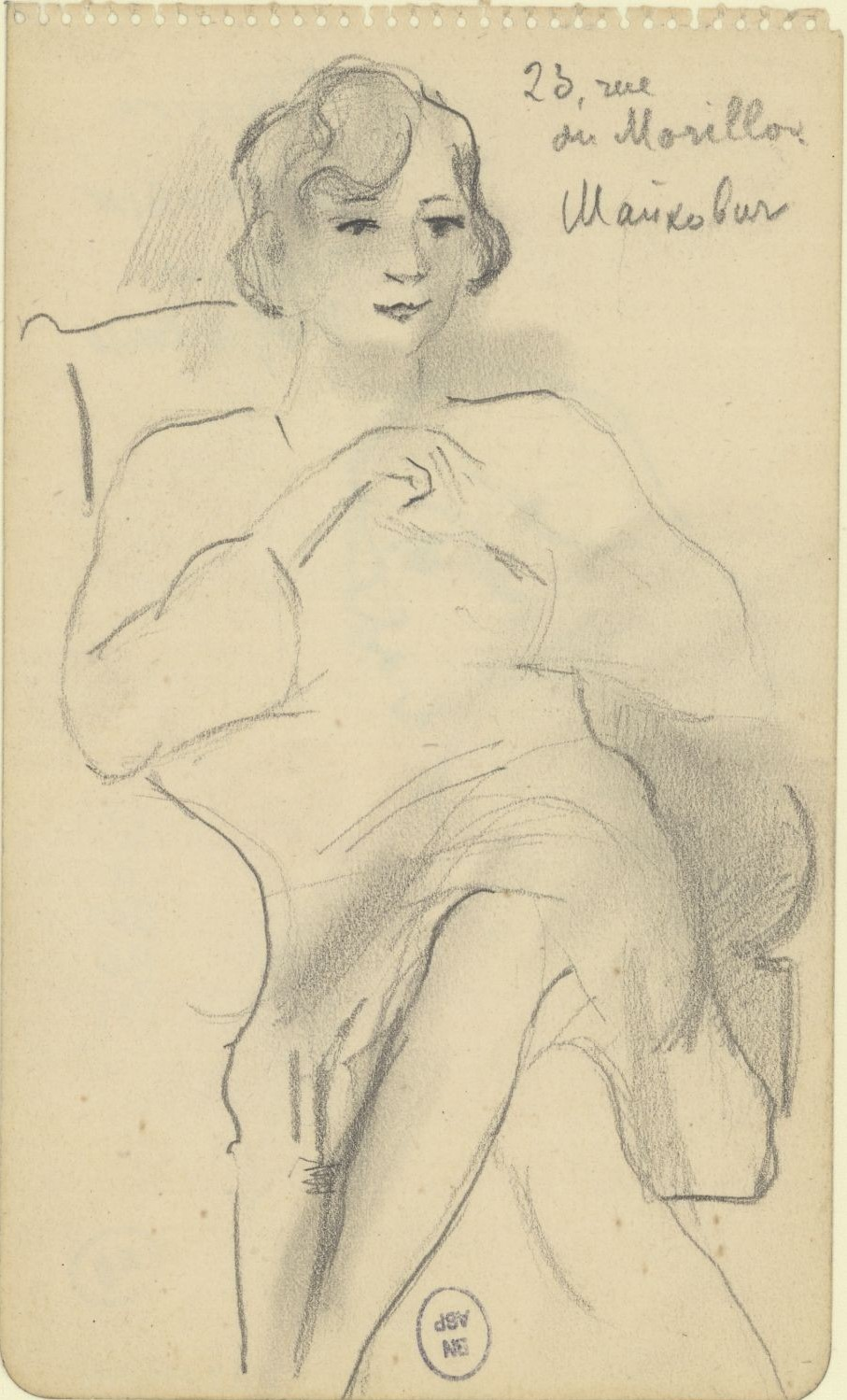
- Sketch of Nina Tikhonova by Serge Choubine
- Born: Nina Alexandrovna Tikhonova; 23 February 1910; Saint Petersburg, Russia
- Died: 4 January 1995 (aged 84); Paris, France
- Dancing career
- Former groups: Ballets Russes; Les Ballets de Monte-Carlo
- Dances: Ballet
- Awards: Ordre des Arts et des Lettres

Nina Alexandrovna Tikhonova (Russian: Нина Александровна Тихонова; 23 February 1910 – 4 January 1995) was a Russian-French ballet dancer and dance teacher, who danced with the Ballets Russes and Les Ballets de Monte-Carlo companies. After retiring from her ballet career, she established her own ballet school in Paris. She was awarded the Ordre des Arts et des Lettres.

== Early life ==
Nina Alexandrovna Tikhonova was born on 23 February 1910 in Saint Petersburg to writer and publisher Alexander "Serebov" Tikhonov, and Varvara Vassilievna Zubkova, who had previously been married to Anatole Tchaikevitch. Tikhonova's parents' marriage ended after Varvara became the mistress of Maxim Gorky, who was a friend of Tikhonov.

The family was separated during the Russian Revolution, and Varvara's children from both marriages lived with their grandmother in Yekaterinburg, before later returning to Saint Petersburg. At the age of 11, Tikhonova and her elder stepbrother Andre Tchaikevitch fled Soviet Russia, taking refuge first in Berlin, then Paris.

== Career ==
Tikhonova was trained in Paris by Russian dancers Olga Preobrajenska and Nikolai Legat. She made her debut at the age of fifteen with the Theatre Romantique Russe, which was founded in Berlin by Boris Romanov. In 1928, she joined Ida Rubinstein's avant-garde troupe of which Bronislava Nijinska was the principal choreographer. Tikhonova later said "Nijinska was a deity for me. Her talent was like no other. I was at Ida Rubinstein's house when she was choreographing there, I followed her when she founded her troupe. I danced in the Biches, and she created Variations for me, to the music of Beethoven".

In July 1931, Tikhonova, with the Ida Rubinstein Company at Covent Garden, performed as Alcine in a rendition of Léonide Massine's ballet set to Georges Auric's music. The season was positively received, with a correspondent from Le Figaro hailing it a "triumph" and wished for a reprisal.

George Balanchine invited her to join his first company Les Ballets 1933, but she opted to join Nijinska's Ballets Russes instead, where she became a soloist. Tikhonova and the Ballets Russes toured extensively throughout South America and Italy. Whilst in Italy, she reunited with Gorky, and together they visited Naples, Pompeii and Capri. She failed to deliver a letter to him from her mother, an action she later regretted.

Between 1942 and 1944, Tikhonova also danced with Les Ballets de Monte-Carlo and thereby avoided some of the brutality of the Nazi occupation of France.

After World War II, Tikhonova taught dance in orphanages for children whose parents had been killed during the war. After her retirement, Tikhonova created her own ballet school in Paris on Conservatoire Russe on the Quai de New York. She continued to teach there throughout the 1960s. Among her students were Marie-France Goudard, Béatrice Massin and Christine Bayle.

== Later life and death ==
In 1971, Tikhonova returned to Russia for the first time in 50 years. She visited Leningrad for the first time since she was a child. She reminisced of her childhood during this visit, writing in her memoir "Some remarkable figure illumined my childhood, and followed my fate. It gave me everything that was good in my life, teaching me early to discern what was bad." She was inspired to work on a book of memoirs after watching a class by Natalia Dudinskaya at the Vaganova Choreographic Academy. The memoir, The Girl in Blue was published in 1991 in France and Russia.

Tikhonova received the Ordre des Arts et des Lettres.

Tikhonova died on 4 January 1995 at her apartment in Paris, at the age of 84. She never married and lived all her life with her stepbrother Andre.
