= Invitation to the Dance (film) =

1956 film by Gene Kelly

- Theatrical release poster
- Directed by: Gene Kelly
- Written by: Gene Kelly
- Produced by: Arthur Freed
- Starring: Gene Kelly; Tamara Toumanova; Igor Youskevitch; Tommy Rall
- Cinematography: Joseph Ruttenberg; Freddie Young
- Edited by: Adrienne Fazan; Raymond Poulton; Robert Watts
- Music by: André Previn; Jacques Ibert; Nicolai Rimsky-Korsakov; Conrad Salinger; John Hollingsworth
- Production companies: Metro-Goldwyn-Mayer; M-G-M Cartoons (animated sequences)
- Distributed by: Metro-Goldwyn-Mayer
- Release date: May 22, 1956
- Running time: 93 minutes
- Country: United States
- Language: None
- Budget: $2,822,000
- Box office: $615,000

Invitation to the Dance is a 1956 American dance anthology film consisting of three distinct stories, all starring and directed by Gene Kelly. It was the first film Kelly directed on his own, after co-directing three films with Stanley Donen.

The film is unusual in that it has no spoken dialogue, with the characters performing their roles entirely through dance and mime. Kelly appears in all three stories, which feature leading dancers of the era, including Tommy Rall, Igor Youskevitch, Tamara Toumanova and Carol Haney.

The film's shooting was completed in 1954, but its release was delayed until 1956 because of doubts at Metro-Goldwyn-Mayer. The movie performed poorly at the box office, and it generally is regarded as an artistic as well as commercial failure.

The film takes its name from a piano composition of the same name by Carl Maria von Weber, portions of which are played during the opening credits.

== Plot ==
=== "Circus" ===
The first segment, set to original music composed for the film by Jacques Ibert, is a tragic love triangle set in a mythical land sometime in the past. Kelly plays a clown, who is in love with another circus performer, played by Claire Sombert. She, however, is in love with an aerialist, played by Youskevitch. The clown, after entertaining the crowds with the other clowns, sees his love and the aerialist kiss, and then wanders into a crowd in shock. That night, he watches them dance together, and after the lady finds him with her shawl, he confesses his love to her. The aerialist finds them and thinks she has been unfaithful and leaves her. The clown sees her affection for the aerialist.

Determined to win her, the clown tries to walk the aerialist's tightrope, only to fall to his death. Dying, he urges the two lovers to forgive each other.

=== "Ring Around the Rosy" ===
The second segment, named after the nursery rhyme "Ring Around the Rosy" was based upon Arthur Schnitzler's La Ronde, and it is set to original music by André Previn, who is off-camera at the piano. It tells romantic stories tied by the exchange of a gold bracelet. The bracelet originally is given by a husband (David Paltenghi) to his flirtatious and apparently unfaithful wife (Daphne Dale). She gives it to her paramour, an artist (Youskevitch), at a party. The husband sees this and stalks off. The artist gives the bracelet to a model (Claude Bessy), who gives it to her boyfriend the Sharpie (Tommy Rall), who is introduced giving an acrobatic dance at a stage door. He in turn gives it to the femme fatale (Belita), only to have her present it to a crooner (Irving Davies) after his performance. He gives the bracelet to a hatcheck girl (Diana Adams) She returns home to her boyfriend, a Marine (Kelly).

When the Marine sees the bracelet, he angrily takes it and storms out. Coming out of a bar, he encounters a streetwalker (Tamara Toumanova) and dances with her, giving her the bracelet before walking off again. The husband encounters the streetwalker and sees the bracelet. He buys it from her and reunites with his wife, returning it to her.

=== "Sinbad the Sailor" ===
The third segment takes its name from the Arabian Nights hero. It is a fantasy consisting of live action and William Hanna-Joseph Barbera-directed animated characters set in the casbah of a Middle Eastern country. Kelly plays a sailor who is sold a magic lantern. Rubbing the lamp, he discovers a childlike genie (David Kasday). Put off by the genie at first, the sailor soon befriends him and changes his clothes into a miniature sailor suit to match his. The genie uses his magic to transport them both inside a book of One Thousand and One Nights. This puts him in conflict with a cartoon dragon, and then two palace guards wielding swords, and falling in love with a cartoon harem girl. With the genie's help, he defeats the two guards by out-dancing them. The harem girl then joins him and the genie after the latter changes her clothes into a women's naval uniform. The film ends with the three of them as they dance into the distance together.

This segment includes complex dance sequences showing a live Kelly dancing with cartoon characters in the picture. Use is also made of the original themes of Nikolai Rimsky-Korsakov's Scheherazade by the MGM music department team of adapter Roger Edens, conductor Johnny Green and orchestrator Conrad Salinger.

== Cast ==
- Gene Kelly - Pierrot / The Marine / Sinbad
- Igor Youskevitch - The Lover / The Artist
- Claire Sombert - The Loved
- Claude Bessy - The Model
- Tamara Toumanova - The Streetwalker
- Diana Adams - Hat Check Girl
- Tommy Rall - The Sharpie
- Belita - The Femme Fatale
- David Paltenghi - The Husband
- Daphne Dale - The Wife
- Irving Davies - The Crooner
- Carol Haney - Scheherazade
- David Kasday - The Genie

== Production ==
Kelly had gone to England for tax reasons, and Invitation to the Dance was one of three films that he made there. From the beginning, he intended it to be an all-dance film with no dialogue. This concept caused apprehension at MGM, because "dance, particularly ballet, was then considered longhair at best, homosexual at worst." Kelly initially had not wanted to appear in any of the segments because he "wanted to show the world that other people danced besides himself and Fred Astaire," but he was forced by the studio to appear in the film himself.

The movie began filming on August 19, 1952 at MGM studios in London and continued there until December 19, with shooting also taking place at MGM in California in October 1952. Shooting continued into 1953 on the "Sinbad" sequence, which made it MGM's second longest shooting schedule at the time. MGM announced in March 1954 that the sequence would be completed by June 15, 19 months after filming began.

Difficulties arose during production of the "Ring Around the Rosy" segment. The original score, by British composer John Addison, was not judged suitable, and "the ballet was finished to bits of the Addison score and counts," with Andre Previn brought in to "tack the music onto the existing choreography."

The film originally was designed to have four segments, ending with "Sinbad." A 28-minute third segment titled "Dance Me a Song" was filmed. It consisted of popular songs interpreted through dance. The songs would have included "They Go Wild, Simply Wild About Me," "The Wiffenpoof Song," "Sunny Side of the Street," Wedding Bells Are Breaking Up That Old Gang of Mine," and "Sophisticated Lady." This sequence was filmed, but later cut.

The film was planned to be released in 1954, but it was not viewed favorably by MGM and was not released until May 1956. New York Times critic Clive Barnes later observed that "when it was let out, gave it fanfares that would be appropriate to the birth of a mouse, not even a cartoon mouse at that," and was "distributed desultorily." It was exhibited in Great Britain as a 62-minute feature composed of the first two segments. According to author Larry Swindell, the film "was effectively thrown away by MGM because it didn't know how to market it."

== Reception ==
=== Critical ===
At the time of its release in May 1956, Invitation to the Dance was not well-received by critics. Kelly's choreography was described by reviewers as the weakest aspect of the film. Dance Magazine critic Arthur Knight criticized Kelly's "artistic pretensions" and wrote that his choreography "rarely rises above the obvious."

The New York Times film critic Bosley Crowther wrote that the idea of an all-dance, no-dialogue film was "exciting and refreshing," but called the film "a jumble of stories and styles." Crowther added that Kelly was "not a particularly imaginative choreographer...his story ideas are somewhat hackneyed and his dances are too elaborate." However, he praised Kelly for "having the urge and nerve to try this film."

Time's critic wrote that the Sinbad sequence indicated that "Hollywood just cannot bring itself to bring the art before the coarse," and New York Daily News critic Wanda Hale wrote that the film would have difficulty appealing to a wide audience and said that "since this arty experiment is out of his system, I hope [Kelly] will leave selection of his vehicles to MGM."

=== Box office ===
The film was a financial failure. According to MGM records, it earned $200,000 in the U.S. and Canada and $415,000 in other markets, recording a loss of $2,523,000 and making it the studio's biggest flop of the year. Kelly later stated that "the public wasn't ready for a serious dance film, and besides, by the time it came out, the popularity of film musicals had declined."

== Awards ==
Award	Date of ceremony	Category	Recipient	Result	Ref.
Berlin International Film Festival	3 July 1956	Golden Bear	Gene Kelly	Won	

== Legacy ==
Invitation to the Dance generally is viewed as not among Kelly's better work. It was rarely revived or shown on television in the years after its release.

Writing in the New York Times in 1977, dance critic Clive Barnes wrote that the film was Kelly "at his most pretentious and least convincing ... the choreography throughout is shallow and facile, and the long‐awaited cartoon segment little but a tiresome gimmick". At the same time, he wrote, "the movie is required watching for everyone interested in movies, in dance or, for that matter, simply in the career of Gene Kelly,' because Invitation to the Dance "was a watershed movie, which even now demands to be seen." Barnes claimed that the film was more ambitious than The Red Shoes because it has no unifying plot, and because it features an international cast of dancers mostly not used to film work. He added, "because at his own level [Kelly] understands dance in way very few directors have ever understood dance, even in Invitation to the Dance he can devise some really beautiful and arresting shots cinematically a pure joy."

== See also ==
- List of American films of 1956
