= Carlotta Zambelli =

Italian ballerina and ballet teacher

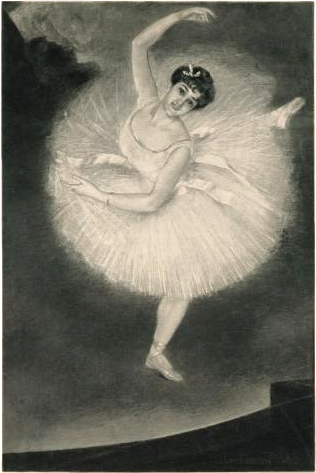
- Carlotta Zambelli (lithograph by Pierre Carrier-Belleuse, c. 1898)
- Born: 4 November 1875; Milan, Kingdom of Italy
- Died: 28 January 1968 (aged 92); Milan, Italy

Carlotta Zambelli (4 November 1875 – 28 January 1968) was an Italian prima ballerina and ballet teacher. Apart from a year in St. Petersburg, she spent her entire career in Paris.

== Early life ==
Zambelli was born in Milan. When she was seven, Zambelli studied at the ballet school of La Scala under Cesare Carnesecchi Coppini and Adelaide Viganò. In August 1894, she was discovered by Pedro Gailhard, director of the Paris Opera, who took her to Paris together with her friend Clotilde Piodi.

== Career ==
She made her début at the Paris Opera in 1894 with Faust and triumphed the following year in the Hellé divertimento, impressing the Parisians with her Italian technique and her fouettés. When Rosita Mauri retired in 1898, Zambelli took her place, earning the distinction of prima ballerina.

She was the last foreigner to be designated prima ballerina at the Mariinsky Theatre in St Petersburg where she was a great success during the year she spent there in 1901 performing the leading roles in Coppélia, Giselle and Paquita. She then returned to Paris where she was the reigning ballerina at the Opéra until her retirement in 1930. She created leading roles in Namouna (1908), Javotte (1909), España (1911), Sylvia (1919), Taglioni chez Musette (1920) and Cydalise et le Chèvre-pied (1923).

Thereafter she taught at the Opera ballet school where she had begun teaching in 1920 and went on to found the Académie Chaptal. She retired from teaching in 1955. Among her most successful students were Lycette Darsonval, Yvette Chauviré and Odette Joyeux.

She was awarded the Legion of Honour in 1956. She died in Milan on 28 January 1968.
