= Victor Gsovsky =

Russian ballet dancer (1902–1974)

Victor Gsovsky (Russian: Виктор Иванович Гзовский; 12 January 1902, Saint Petersburg – 14 March 1974, Hamburg) was a Russian ballet dancer, teacher, balletmaster and choreographer.

== Biography ==
He studied with Mariinsky Theatre prima ballerina Evgenia Sokolova and started his teaching career while still very young.

In 1925 Victor Gsovsky left Soviet Russia with his wife Tatjana Gsovsky, whom he had met in Krasnodar. Their first engagement was in Berlin, Germany, where he worked as dancer and choreographer at the Berlin State Opera (1925–1928) before opening a private school in 1928. From 1930 to 1933 he worked as a choreographer for the German UFA Film Company and undertook smaller tours with his wife and the Ballet Gsovsky.

From 1937 he was ballet master of the Markova-Dolin company; in 1938 he began teaching in Paris and in 1945 was appointed ballet master of the Paris Opera Ballet. In 1946–1947 he was ballet master with the Ballets des Champs-Élysées and again in 1948 and 1953; with the Metropolitan Ballet in London in 1947.

From 1950 to 1952 he was ballet director of the Munich State Opera. After leaving Munich he worked as a choreographer and ballet master in several European locations. He was ballet master in Düsseldorf (1964–1967) and at the Hamburg State Opera (1967–1970). He staged the first post-war production of La Sylphide for the Ballets des Champs-Élysées in 1946. His best-known work by far is the Grand Pas Classique (mus. Auber, 1949), which is still performed in galas around the world. An influential teacher, his students included Yvette Chauviré, Nina Vyroubova, Colette Marchand, Violette Verdy, and Vera Zorina.

== Works ==
Victor Gsovsky's choreography includes:

- Swan Lake Act II, Paris Opera, 1945
- Grand Pas Classique, music by Daniel-François-Esprit Auber (to the ballet music from his opera Le Dieu et La Bayadere, 1830), created for Yvette Chauviré and Vladimir Skouratoff, Théâtre des Champs-Elysées, Paris, 1949
- Mascarade, music by Georges Bizet (Variations chromatiques, orchestrated by Felix Weingartner), Théâtre des Champs-Élysées, Paris, 1948
- Hamlet (together with Tatjana Gsovsky), music by Boris Blacher, Prinzregententheater Munich, 1950
- La Sylphide, music by Jean-Madeleine Schneitzhoeffer, Prinzregententheater Munich, 1951
- Weg zum Licht, music by Georges Auric, Prinzregententheater Munich, 1952
- Pas de cœur, music by Gottfried von Einem, Prinzregententheater Munich, 1952
