= Olga Preobrajenska =

Russian ballerina (1871–1962)

Olga Preobrajenskaya
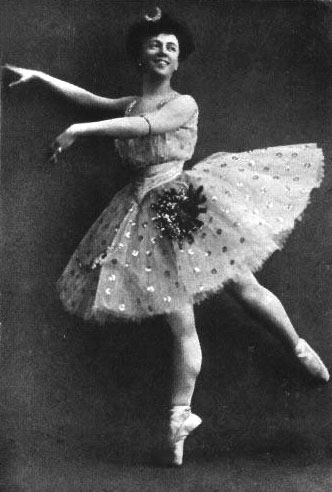
- Preobrajenskaya as the Tsar Maiden in Alexander Gorsky's revival of The Little Humpbacked Horse. St. Petersburg, 1912.
- Born: Olga Iosifovna Preobrazhenskaya; 21 January 1871; Saint Petersburg, Russia
- Died: 27 December 1962 (aged 91); Paris, France
- Occupations: Prima ballerina; ballet teacher
- Career
- Former groups: Russian Imperial Ballet

Olga Iosifovna Preobrajenska (Russian: О́льга Ио́сифовна Преображе́нская; born Preobrazhenskaya; 2 February [O.S. 21 January] 1871 – 27 December 1962) was a Russian ballerina of the Russian Imperial Ballet and a ballet instructor.

== Biography ==
She was born in Saint Petersburg as Olga Preobrazhenskaya (the final syllable of her surname was dropped to shorten her name for professional purposes, and she used the French transliteration, Preobrajenska).

Olga—born frail and with a crooked spine and one hyper-extended knee—was an unlikely prima ballerina. But she had dreams of being a dancer, and for years her parents tried unsuccessfully to get her enrolled in dance school. The selection committee repeatedly rejected her as a candidate. But after three years of trying, her parents succeeded and the eight-year-old Olga entered the Imperial Ballet School in 1879.

Despite her physical shortcomings, Preobrajenska grew strong with training under Marius Petipa, Lev Ivanov and Anna Johansson. She developed excellent turnout and toe point, though her hunched back remained troublesome. She was naturally expressive, bringing new life to a "hackneyed" repertoire, and exhibited the desired softness and grace of a dancer.

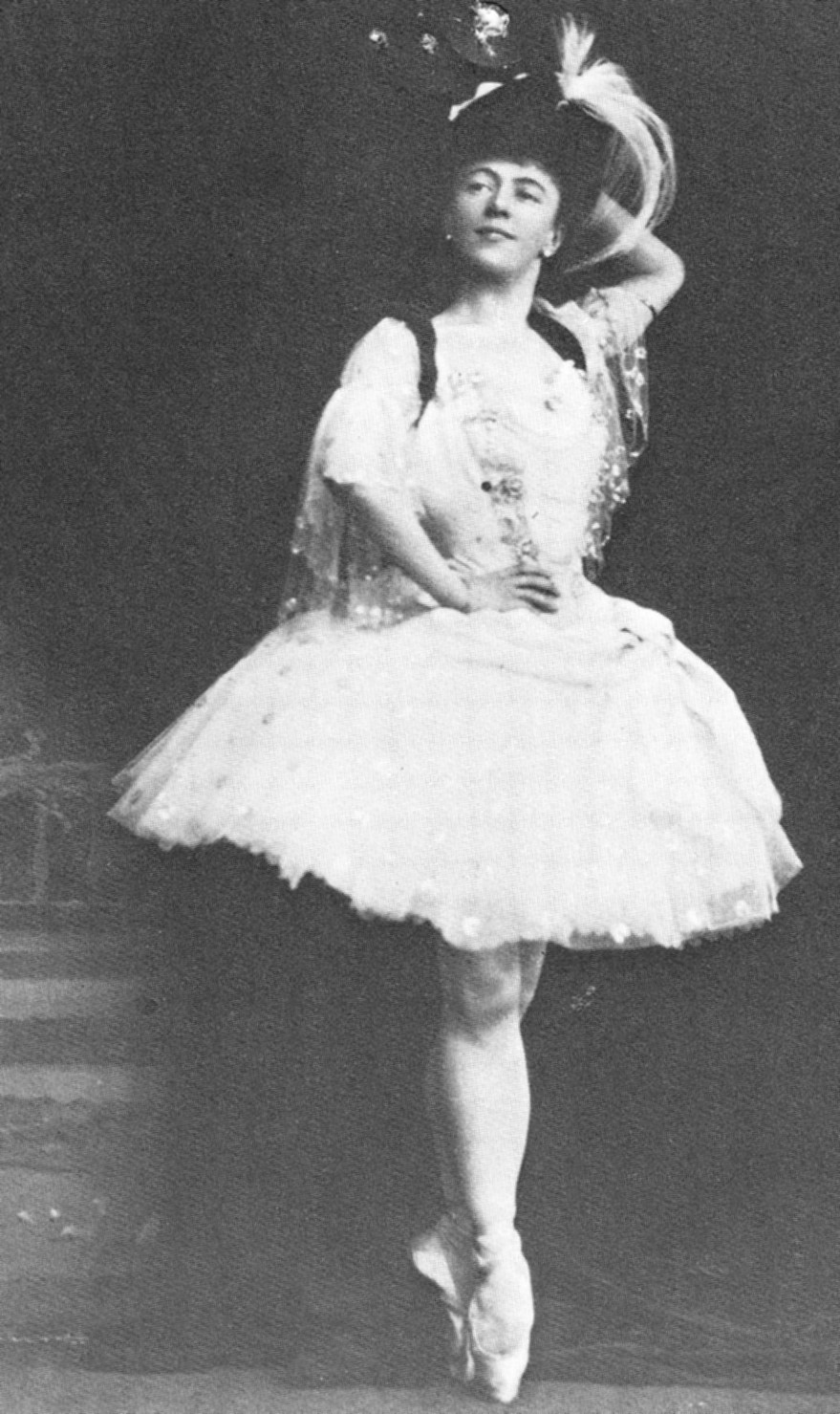
Preobrajenskaya in the title role of the ballet Raymonda, 1903. Preobrajenskaya was the first ballerina to perform the role after its originator, Pierina Legnani, retired in 1901.

In addition to her love of dance, Preobrajenska had musicality to go with it; she studied singing, performed opera arias, and played the piano masterfully.

In 1892, she made her debut in Kalkabrino, the first of her many performances in Petipa creations, which included Bluebeard (1896), Les Millions d'Arlequin (1900) and Les Saisons (1900). She also performed in Ivanov and Gerdt's Sylvia (1901), Nikolai and Sergei Legat's The Fairy Doll (1903), and Mikhail Fokin's The Night of Terpsichore and Chopiniana (1908).

In 1895, she began to make international appearances, including in Paris, London and the United States. In 1900, she achieved the title of prima ballerina. One of her finer moments as a performer was dancing at Milan's La Scala theatre. She received critical acclaim and audience adoration, no small feat for a Russian ballerina trained in the Italian school.

She then began to pay more attention to ballet instruction; in 1914, she began her teaching career in Saint Petersburg, where her pupils included Alexandra Danilova. In 1921, following the Russian Revolution, she emigrated and taught for two years in Milan, London, Buenos Aires and Berlin, then settled in with the large white émigré community in Paris.

For the next several decades, she was one of the most prominent ballet teachers in Paris, instructing Irina Baronova, Tatiana Dokoudovska, Tamara Toumanova and Igor Youskevitch. She retired in 1960; she died two years later, aged 91. She was buried in the Russian Orthodox section of the Sainte-Geneviève-des-Bois Russian Cemetery.

== Pupils ==
- Alberto Alonso
- Irina Baronova
- Maurice Béjart
- Alan Bergman
- Rachel Cameron
- Alexandra Danilova
- Adam Darius
- Darja Collin
- Tatiana Dokoudovska
- André Eglevsky
- Margot Fonteyn
- Maina Gielgud
- Lin Jaldati
- Hélène Kirsova
- Nathalie Krassovska
- Milorad Miskovitch
- Yvonne Mounsey
- Nadia Nerina
- Daniel Spoerri
- Ludmila Tcherina
- Tamara Tchinarova
- Nina Tikhonova
- Tamara Toumanova
- Georgette Tsinguirides
- Nina Vyroubova
- Margarete Wallmann
- Belinda Wright
- Igor Youskevitch
- Nina Youskevitch
- Vera Zorina
- George Zoritch
- Marina Olenina
- Nina Kirsanova

== See also ==
- List of Russian ballet dancers
