= Yvette Chauviré =

French prima ballerina and actress (1917–2016)

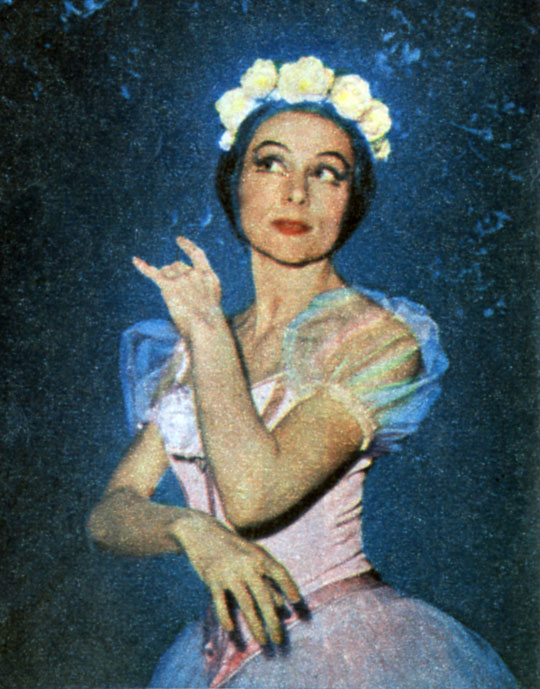
- Yvette Chauviré (1957)
- Born: Yvette Adrienne Chauviré; 22 April 1917; Paris, France
- Died: 19 October 2016 (aged 99); Paris, France
- Occupation: Ballet dancer
- Years active: 1929–1972
- Spouse: Constantin Nepokoitchitsky (m. 19??-1976; his death)

Yvette Chauviré ([i.vɛt ʃo.vi.ʁe]; 22 April 1917 – 19 October 2016) was a French prima ballerina assoluta and actress. She is often described as France's greatest ballerina, and was the mentor of another pair of well-known prima ballerinas named, Sylvie Guillem and Marie-Claude Pietragalla. She was awarded the Légion d'Honneur in 1964.

== Early life ==
Yvonne Chauviré was born in Paris on 22 April 1917. At the age of 10, in 1927, she enrolled in the Paris Opera Ballet school. Two years after, she was noticed for her excellent performance in the children's ballet L'Eventail de Jeanne ("Jeanne's Fan"). The following year, when she was 13, she received an invitation to join the ballet company of the Paris Opera.

== Career ==
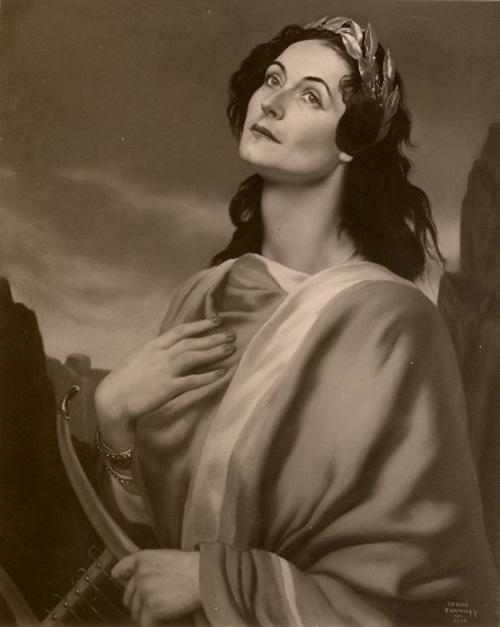
Portrait d'Yvette Chauviré par Serge Ivanoff, Paris, 1944

Chauviré rose through the ranks of dancers at the Paris Opera Ballet, becoming a principal dancer in 1937 and étoile, the highest rank, in 1941.

She was the star of a number of experimental works choreographed by the company's director Serge Lifar, including Alexandre le Grand, Istar, Suite en Blanc and Les Mirages. Lifar also encouraged her to study with two Russian choreographers—Boris Kniaseff and Victor Gsovsky, who influenced her style towards lyricism and away from her hard-lined academic training.

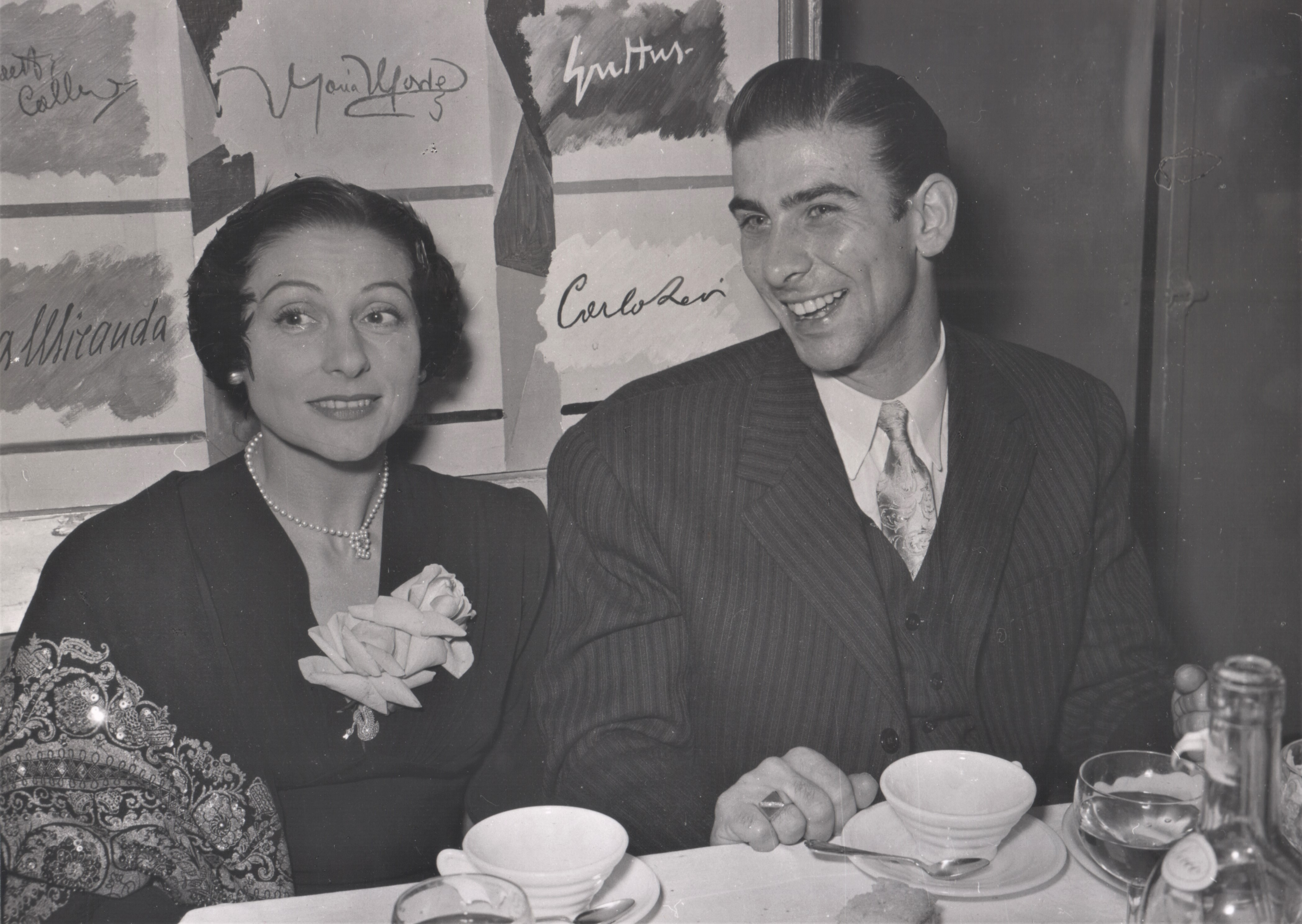
With Italian ballet dancer Guido Lauri in Rome in the mid-50s.

Although never a pupil of Carlotta Zambelli's, Chauviré later admitted that she spent a great deal of time watching Zambelli teach and learnt to copy her techniques and movements and make her own version out of it.

However, Lifar, the company director, was accused of being a supporter of Germany during World War II. He was forced to leave the company in 1945 and the following year Chauviré also left, following Lifar to his newly formed company named the Nouveau Ballet de Monte-Carlo. In 1947, both Lifar and Chauviré returned to the Paris Opera Ballet; however, Chauviré left again in 1949 due to contractual disagreements with the company over her freedom to dance with other companies. She performed in a range of productions, including two made by her former teacher Gsovsky: Grand pas classique, for the Ballets des Champs-Elysées, and La Dame aux camélias, for the Berlin Ballet.

In 1953 the Paris Opera Ballet agreed to a more flexible contract and she returned to the company but continued to dance as a guest performer with companies in Europe, the United States, South Africa and Latin America. She often danced with Rudolf Nureyev, who described her as a "legend", and also danced with Māris Liepa and Erik Bruhn. During this time she widened her range of roles and began to perform in more classical productions such as Giselle, Sleeping Beauty and The Nutcracker. The role of Giselle became a particular passion for Chauviré, and she considered it her signature piece.

Chauviré retired from the Paris Opera Ballet in 1956, but continued to appear with the company until 1972. She was also co-director of the Paris Opera Ballet school from 1963 to 1968, and taught Sylvie Guillem and Marie-Claude Pietragalla. She choreographed some short ballets herself. In 1970, she became Director of the International Academy of Dance, in Paris.

In a 1989 interview, she characterised contemporary style as becoming "more and more slipshod", and criticised the fashion for "extreme" ballet movements as risking injury to the dancer. She said she had tried during her career, "to simplify, within the greatest technical difficulty".

In 1992, Chauviré served as an inaugural juror for the International Dance Association's Prix Benois de la Danse competition.

=== Publications ===
Chauviré published two autobiographies in her lifetime: in 1960, a book titled Je suis ballerine, and in 1997, with Gerard Mannoni, Yvette Chauviré – Autobiographie.

=== Film roles ===
In 1937, Chauviré performed in Jean Benoît-Lévy's film La Mort du Cygne ("The Death of the Swan"), which told the story of a young girl who aspires to become a ballet dancer. The film received the Grand Prix du Film Francais at the 1937 Paris Exposition and was released in the United States the following year under the title Ballerina. Chauviré became a star in the United States, and was featured on the cover of Life magazine in December 1938. In 1988, the film was rediscovered and screened in New York with Chauviré as a commentator.

Chauviré was also the subject of a documentary film produced by Dominique Delouche, Yvette Chauviré: une étoile pour l'example, which was screened at the Cannes Film Festival in 1983. The film shows coaching sessions between Chauviré and younger ballerinas, such as Dominique Khalfouni, as well as archival footage of her performances.

=== Honors ===
- Chevalier of Ordre of the Legion of Honnour, in 1964.
- Commander of Ordre of the Legion of Honnour, 24 mars 1988. (March 24, 1988)
- Grand officer of Ordre of the Legion of Honnour, 13 juillet 2015. (July 13, 2015)
- Commander of National Order of Merit, 22 juin 1994. (June 22, 1994)
- Grand cross of National Order of Merit, 10 novembre 1997. (November 10, 1997)
- Commander of Ordre of Arts and Letters.

== Personal life ==
Chauviré was married to a Russian artist, Constantin Nepokoitchitsky (known as Constantin Nepo), who died in 1976. She died at her home in Paris on 19 October 2016, aged 99.

== Notable published works ==
- Je suis ballerine (1960)
