= Serge Lifar =

French-Ukrainian ballet master

- Сергій Лифар
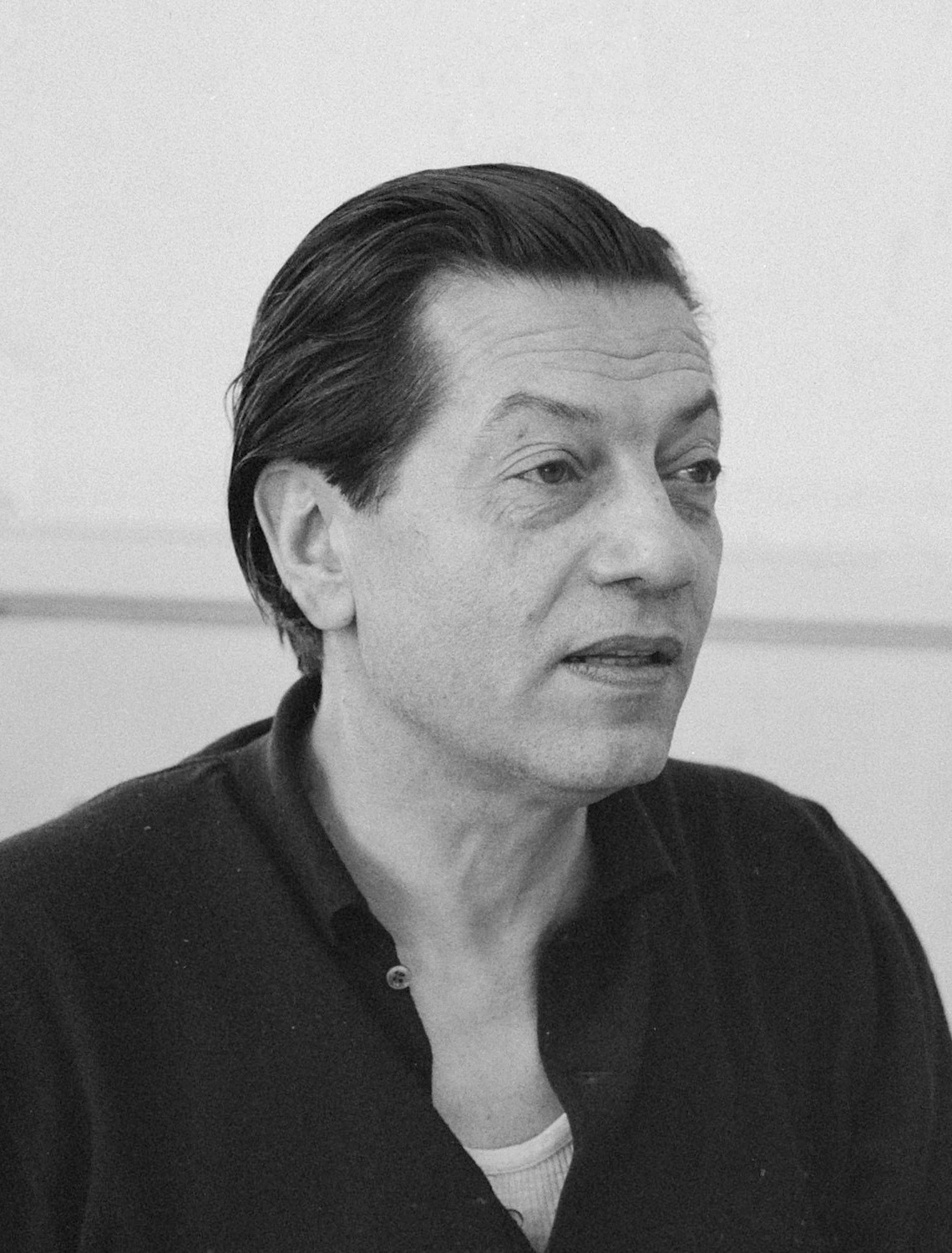
- Serge Lifar in 1961
- Born: Serhіy Mуkhailovуch Lуfar; 02 April 1905; Kiev, Russian Empire (now Kyiv, Ukraine)
- Died: 15 December 1986 (aged 81); Lausanne, Vaud, Switzerland
- Occupations: ballet dancer, choreographer
- Known for: Paris Opéra Ballet

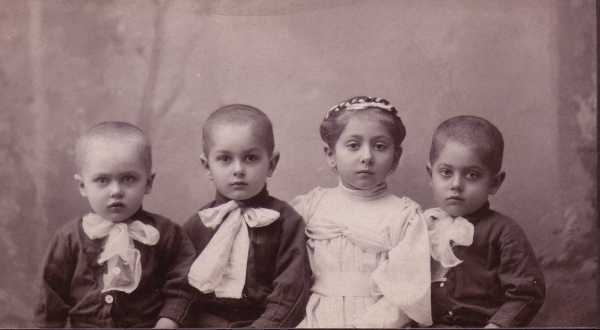
Serge Lifar with siblings Leonid, Basil, Evgenia

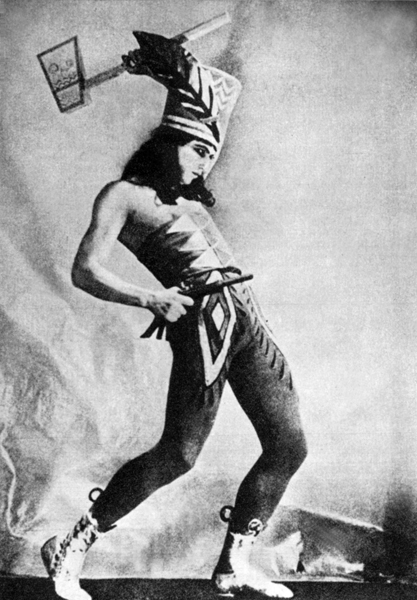
Lifar in Karol Szymanowski's Harnasie in 1936

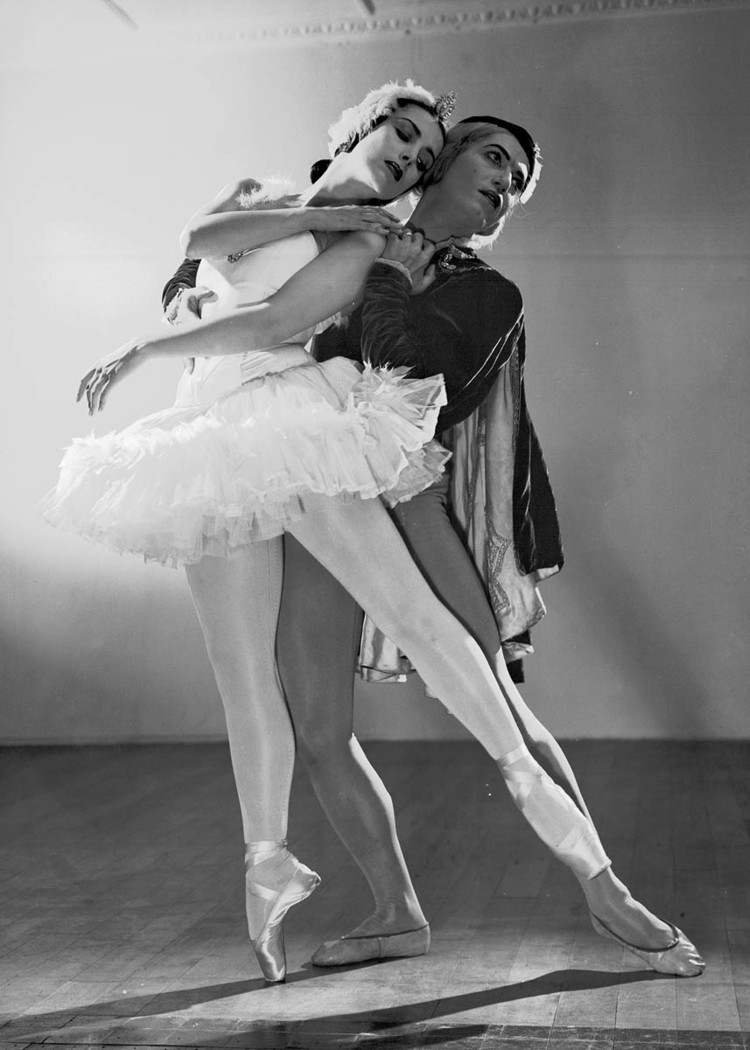
Lifar with Tamara Toumanova

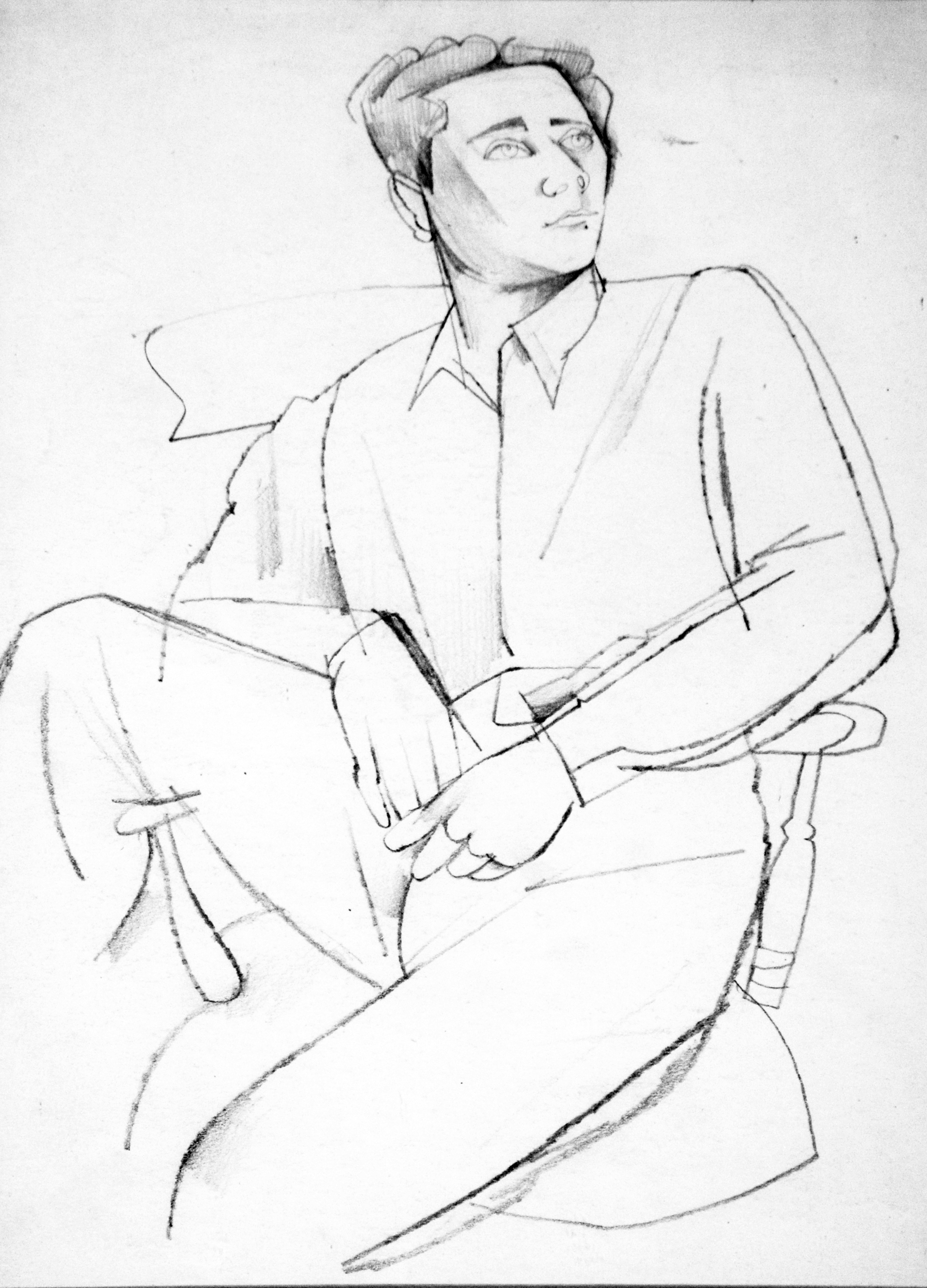
Portrait of Serge Lifar by Christopher Wood (artist) in 1929

Serge Lifar (Ukrainian: Сергій Михайлович Лифар, romanized: Serhii Mykhailovych Lyfar; 20 March [O.S. 7 March] 1905 – 15 December 1986) was a Ukrainian dancer. Lifar was also a choreographer, director, writer, theoretician about dance, and collector.

As ballet master of the Paris Opera from 1930 to 1944, and from 1947 to 1958, he devoted himself to the restoration of the technical level of the Paris Opera Ballet, returning it to its place as one of the best companies in the world.

== Biography ==
=== Early life and education ===
Lifar was born in Kiev (now Kyiv), Russian Empire. His year of birth is officially shown as 1904 (as on a 2004 Ukrainian stamp commemorating his centenary). He became the pupil of Bronislava Nijinska in her ballet studio «School of Movement», 1921.

In 1923 he left his native city and was noticed by Sergei Diaghilev, who sent him to Turin in order to improve his technique with Enrico Cecchetti.

=== Ballets Russes ===
He made his debut at the Ballets Russes in 1923, where he became the principal dancer in 1925. Lifar was considered the successor to Nijinsky in the Ballets Russes. He was cast at the age of 21 opposite Tamara Karsavina in Nijinska's Roméo et Juliette (1926, score by Constant Lambert); Karsavina was twice his age. He originated leading roles in three Balanchine ballets for the Ballets Russes, including La Chatte (1927), with a score by French composer Henri Sauguet and based on an Aesop fable, which featured Lifar's famous entrance in a 'chariot' formed by his male companions; Ode, with a score by Nicholas Nabokov, by Léonide Massine and Apollon Musagète (1928) with a score by Stravinsky depicting the birth of the Greek God Apollo and his encounter with the three muses, Calliope, Polyhymnia, and Terpsichore; and Le Fils prodigue (The Prodigal Son) (1929), with a score by Sergei Prokofiev, the last great ballet of the Diaghilev era.

=== Paris Opéra Ballet ===
At the death of Diaghilev in 1929, Lifar at the age of 24 was invited by Jacques Rouché to take over the directorship of the Paris Opéra Ballet, which had fallen into decline in the late 19th century. Lifar gave the company a new strength and purpose, initiating the rebirth of ballet in France, and began to create the first of many ballets for that company. These were immediately successful, such as Les Créatures de Prométhée (1929), a personal version of Le Spectre de la rose (1931); and L'Après-midi d'un faune (1935); Icare (1935), with costumes and decor by Picasso; Istar (1941); and Suite en Blanc (1943), which he qualified as Neoclassical ballet.

As part of his effort to revitalize dance, Lifar thought the basic principles of ballet—specifically the five positions of the feet—denied mobility for the dancer. He codified two additional positions, known as the sixth and seventh positions, with the feet turned in, not out like the first five positions. The sixth and seventh positions were not Lifar's inventions, but revivals of positions that already existed in the eighteenth century, when there were ten positions of the feet in classical ballet; and their use is limited to Lifar's choreographies.

During his three decades as director of the Paris Opéra Ballet, Lifar led the company through the turbulent times of World War II and the German occupation of France. Lifar was a collaborationist under the occupation. Lifar's postwar trial resulted in his condemnation as a collaborator and his suspension from the national stage. During his absence, Balanchine was hired to replace him.

Returning to his former position, Lifar's presence was vehemently opposed by the Opera stagehands with the result that he was not allowed to appear on stage nor to consult with technical staff directly on any productions. Nevertheless, he brought the Paris Opéra Ballet to America and performed to full houses at the New York City Center despite protests. Audiences were enthusiastic and had great admiration for the company of dancers. He undoubtedly influenced Yvette Chauviré, Janine Charrat, and Roland Petit.

In 1958, Lifar was forced into retirement due to a strained relationship with the Opera management. A famous photograph was taken of Lifar leaving the Palais Garnier, after being forced to resign, looking somber and clasping the wings from the costume of Icarus that the character puts on in order to fly.

Icare (1935) by Serge Lifar

In 1935, Serge Lifar presented his most significant ballet, "Icare". Before this moment, his work had focused primarily on restoring and preserving classical ballets such as "Swan Lake" and "Giselle", but Lifar felt that it was time for change. He recognized that ballet required not just the recreation of old traditions but also the exploration of new ways forward. This realization led him to delve deeper into the relationship between dance and music, culminating in the creation of the Choreographer’s Manifesto.

Published on his thirtieth birthday, the manifesto marked a pivotal moment in the history of ballet. In it, Lifar argued that dance should take center stage in ballet, with music merely accentuating its expressiveness. He believed that rhythm was the key link between the two art forms, but not all rhythmic structures were suitable for dance. According to Lifar, composers should follow the choreographer’s lead, working together to create music that complements and enhances the unity of the performance, rather than distracting from the movement.

However, Lifar did not believe that art could exist solely in the realm of theoretical musings; it had to be realized on stage. For this reason, he sought to bring his ideas to life, and Icare became a true manifestation of his views. The myth of "Icare", in particular, seemed to him the most poetic, most suitable for expression through movement. He saw in Icare a symbol of aspiration, the desire to reach great heights, an indomitable spirit, and the inevitable punishment for striving towards the unattainable.

Creation of Icare

The idea for the ballet Icare had been with Lifar since 1930. He even commissioned music for the piece from Igor Markevitch, but after hearing it, Lifar realized that no melody could convey the stark beauty of the myth and the unique vision of dance he sought to embody. Lifar understood that the flight and fall of "Icare" did not require traditional musical accompaniment. In fact, any external music would only distract from the essence of the performance. He concluded that the drama could be conveyed through silence or the dull thuds of a heartbeat, with sharp, sudden sounds breaking through the silence to highlight the climactic moments.

This was a revolutionary approach. Lifar decided that Icare would be the first ballet staged without music. He wanted to prove that dance as an art form could be so expressive that it could exist without accompaniment. His goal was not merely to create another choreographic work, but to demonstrate a new direction for the development of ballet—one where movement was the primary foundation, and music, if present, merely served to support that movement. Icare became not just another ballet but an experiment that showcased the power of dance as an independent art form. Lifar challenged traditional notions of ballet, and his bold decision left a profound mark on the history of choreography.

The Uniqueness of "Icare"

In "Icare", Serge Lifar explored the full depth of corporeal lyricism. However, the true uniqueness of this production lay elsewhere: for the first time, Lifar sought to liberate dance from the rigid dependency on music, giving it its own sound. In this ballet, dance seems to challenge the sky itself. The dancer uses the last reflections of earthly existence to propel them into the boundless cosmos. This daring desire for the unattainable, doomed to be tested, is symbolized by the myth that shatters his wings, but simultaneously, the genius of dance saves him, offering a single chance to become human.

Transforming this idea from theory into practice, in 1935, he created "Icare", accompanied only by a group of percussion instruments. He sought to avoid imposing a musical score onto his own rhythm and dance, believing that the human body had immense melodic potential and fearing that additional music might dissolve the natural harmony of the dance and distract the audience.

The true expressive power of "Icare" lies in its unique, constantly evolving rhythm. The body of the classical dancer functions in the manner comparable to an orchestra, creating an analytical, visible melody. In observing the performance, viewers may experience an internal and subjectve music interpretation, as individual feelings might be expressed and affected by the dance.

=== Later life ===
On 30 March 1958, at age 52, Lifar faced off against the 72-year-old impresario George de Cuevas in a duel in France. The duel was precipitated by an argument over changes to Black and White (Suite en blanc), a ballet by Lifar that was being presented by the Cuevas ballet company. Lifar had his face slapped in public after insisting that he retained the rights to Black and White. Lifar sent his seconds to Cuevas who refused to extend an apology and chose to duel with swords. As duels had been "technically outlawed" in the 17th century, the time and location of the duel were not disclosed to the public. The duel was conducted in front of 50 newspaper photographers and ended with the two combatants in tears and embraces in what The New York Times wrote "what may well have been the most delicate encounter in the history of French dueling," with the sole injury being a cut on Lifar's right forearm in the seventh minute.

In 1977 the Paris Opéra Ballet devoted a full evening to his choreography.

=== Death ===
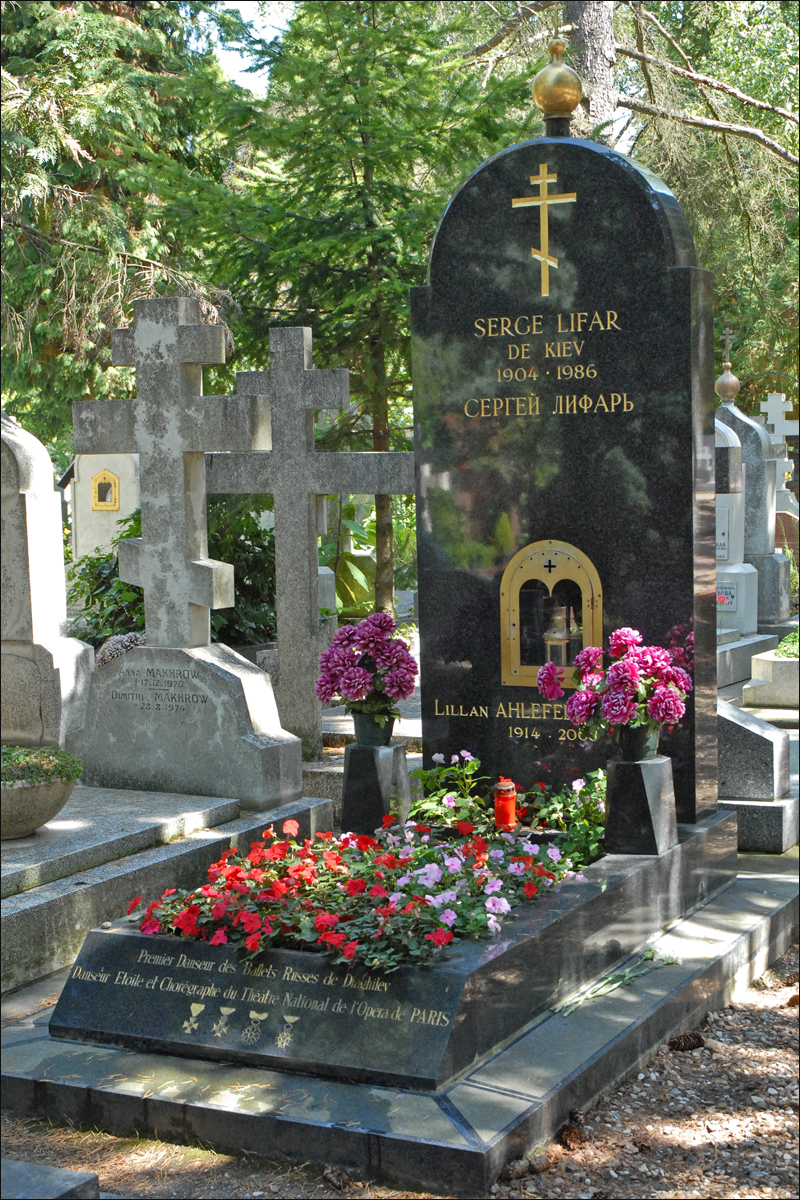
Grave of Serge Lifar in Sainte-Geneviève-des-Bois

He died in Lausanne, Switzerland, on 15 December 1986, aged 81, and was buried in Sainte-Geneviève-des-Bois Russian Cemetery.

== Legacy ==
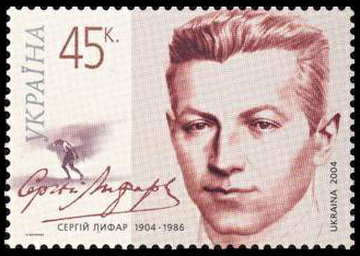
2004 Ukrainian Stamp

Editions Sauret published his memoirs, titled Les Mémoires d'Icare, posthumously in 1993. The title references one of his greatest roles in the ballet Icare. "The story of the ballet is based on the ancient Greek myth of Icarus, whose father Daedalus builds him a pair of artificial wings. Disobeying his father's orders, Icarus flies too close to the sun, which melts the wax in his wings and causes him to plunge to his death."

The Serge Lifar Foundation was set up on 23 August 1989 by Lifar's companion, Countess Lilian Ahlefeldt-Laurvig. In 2012, jewels from the Countess' estate were auctioned at Sotheby's, with the proceeds going to the foundation.

In the summer of 1994 the First Lifar International Ballet Contest was held on the stage of the National Ukraine Opera. The Sixth Lifar International Ballet Competition was held in April 2006 and the seventh in Donetsk in March–April 2011.

== Awards and honours ==
- Commandeur des Arts et des Lettres
- Chevalier de la Légion d'honneur (1983)

== Books ==
In 1935 Lifar published his confessio fidei ("confession of faith") titled Le manifesto du chorégraphe, proposing laws about the independence of choreography. Some of views include:

We cannot, should not, dance everything. Ballet must remain closely linked to dance itself: ballet cannot be the illustration of any other art. Ballet should not borrow its rhythmic shape from music. Ballet can freely exist without musical accompaniment. When a ballet is closely linked to its score, the rhythmic base must be dictated by the choreographer and not the composer. The choreographer must not be the slave of the painter/designer. A free and independent choreographic theatre must be created.

He also wrote a biography of Diaghilev titled Serge Diaghilev, His Life, His Work, His Legend: An Intimate Biography published by Putnam, London, 1940.

== Cultural depictions ==
- Anna Pavlova, film by Emil Loteanu; portrayed by Igor Sklyar (1983).
