= Alban Lendorf =

Danish ballet dancer and actor

Alban Lendorf (7 September 1989) is a Danish ballet dancer, choreographer, and actor, who was a principal with the Royal Danish Ballet and the American Ballet Theatre. He was also a guest artist with the English National Ballet and the Stanislavski Ballet.

He transitioned to acting following his retirement from dance at the age of 29.

== Education ==
Lendorf was born in Copenhagen, Denmark in 1989. He was trained at the Royal Danish Ballet School, which follows the Bournonville method.

== Dancing career ==
Lendorf became an apprentice at the Royal Danish Ballet (RDB) in 2006 upon graduation from the school, and in 2008 he joined the corps de ballet. He was appointed soloist in 2010, and was promoted to principal dancer in April 2011 at the age of 21.

He danced with the American Ballet Theatre (ABT) from 2013, first as an exchange artist, then as a guest principal, before joining the company as a principal in 2015.

He left the RDB in 2018 and the ABT in 2019, and ended his dancing career following a knee injury. He remains involved with the RDB as a choreographer and teacher.

=== Repertoire ===
Principal parts at the Royal Danish Ballet:

- James in August Bournonville's La Sylphide.
- Prince Desiré in Christopher Wheeldon's version of Sleeping Beauty.
- Prince Siegfried in Nikolaj Hübbe and Silja Schandorff's version of Swan Lake.
- Le Corsaire Pas de Deux.
- Gennaro in Bournonville's Napoli.
- Apollo in George Balanchine's Apollo.

Soloist parts at the Royal Danish Ballet: Blue bird in Christopher Wheeldons Sleeping Beauty, Pas de sept in A Folk Tale, soloist in Etudes, Harlekin in La Sonnambula, soloist in Symphony in C, Dances at a Gathering, Other Dances, Donizetti Variations, Puck in A Midsummer Night's Dream, young gypsy in Don Quixote, soloist in Les Gentilhommes, Les Lutins and The Jockey Dance.

=== Premieres ===
- Jago in Othello by Louise Midjord
- Eidolon by Kim Brandstup
- An Elegy for Us by Iain Rowe
- Bournonville Variations by Thomas Lund.

== Acting career ==
Lendorf started acting in the 2010s, and turned to an acting career following his retirement from dancing.

== Principal awards, grants and scholarships ==
- 2009: Golden Ballet Award.
- 2009: D.A.N.C.E. Legatet.
- 2010: Albert Gaubiers Grant and Edith Allers Memorial Grant.
- 2011: Most outstanding Male Dancer of the Year at Premio Positano Léonide Massine.
- 2012: Reumert Award.
- 2013: Benois de la Danse.
- 2014: Reumert Award (Come Fly Away, Grand Pas classique and Manon, Royal Danish Theatre).
