= Le Conservatoire =

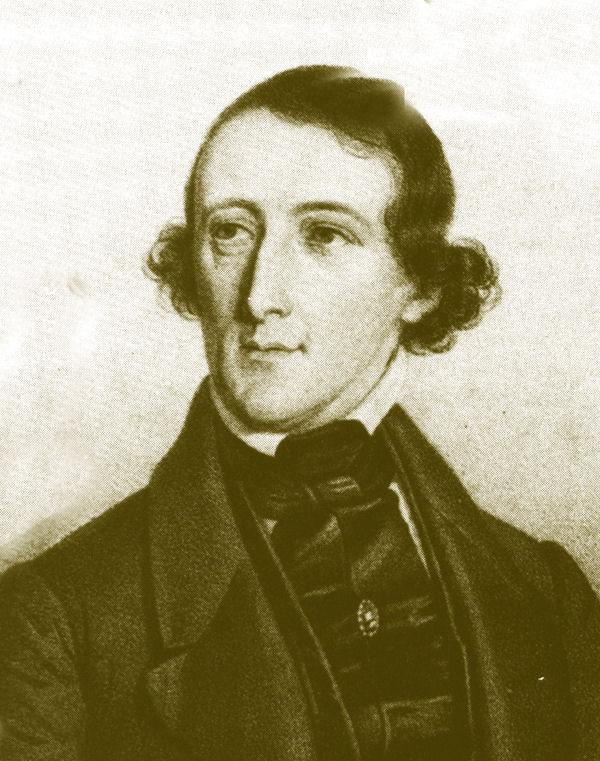
August Bournonville, 1841

Le Conservatoire, or A Marriage by Advertisement (Konservatoriet eller et Avisfrieri) is a two-act vaudeville ballet created by the Danish choreographer and ballet master August Bournonville in 1849 for the Royal Danish Ballet. The ballet's setting is a dance studio at the Conservatoire de Paris. Bournonville studied at the Paris Conservatoire in the 1820s with the renowned dancer Auguste Vestris. The ballet launched the career of prima ballerina Juliette Price. A divertissement within the larger work called "The Dancing School" (Pas d'école) permitted Bournonville to display the basics of his style and raise them to the level of enduring art.

== Summary ==
The first act is a recreation of a Vestris dance class of the exact type attended by Bournonville during his Paris sojourn in the 1820s. In the second act, Monsieur Dufour, an inspecteur at the Conservatoire, writes a matrimonial advertisement in the newspaper but ends up marrying his housekeeper, Mademoiselle Bonjour. Typical of Bournonville’s ballets, the plot provides opportunities for introducing different dance divertissements. In the second act, for example, the pupils of the Conservatoire make a fool of Monsieur Dufour by disguising themselves as attractive women.

== Music ==
The vaudeville genre relied on a particular musical practice that made conscious use of well-known melodies that were suitable to establish period and local color and to facilitate the audience's understanding of the extensive mime. The ballet's composer Holger Simon Paulli attempted to evoke Paris in the 1820s and 1830s. The ballet opens with Paulli's orchestrated version of Weber's concert waltz, Invitation to the Dance. Later in the score Paulli utilised Chopin's Grande valse brillante in E-flat major and Paisiello's aria Nel cor più non mi sento from the opera La Molinara. The divertissement in act 1 (Pas d'école) relies heavily on musical borrowings and the well-known pas de trois employs nearly all of Pierre Rode's Violin Concerto No.7, Op.9 from 1800, a concerto that was used as an examination piece for young violinists at the time Bournonville was living in Paris and studying with Vestris.

== History ==
The complete two-act ballet was performed by the Royal Danish Ballet from 1849 until 1934, when it disappeared from the repertoire, perhaps because it was considered old-fashioned. In 1942, Harald Lander, the Royal Ballet director at the time, extracted "The Dancing School" (Pas d'école) from the larger work and staged it as a one-act divertissement.

In 1995, the Royal Danish Ballet brought the complete two-act version back into the repertoire with the help of three Bournonville experts: Kirsten Ralov, former Assistant Director and principal of the company, principal dancer Niels Bjørn Larsen, and teacher Dinna Bjørn, Larsen's daughter.

By combining personal memories of the stagings in the early 1930s, Bournonville's notations, and the writings of dancer Valborg Borchsenius regarding Harald Lander’s staging in the 1930s, the three directors made it possible to re-stage the complete Le Conservatoire.

== See also ==
- List of ballets by August Bournonville
