= Ib Andersen =

Danish ballet dancer and choreographer

- Born: 14 December 1954 (age 71); Copenhagen
- Known for: Ballet dancer, choreographer and artistic director
- Awards: Royal Danish Ballet (youngest principal dancer in the company's history)
- Website: https://www.ibandersen.com/

Ib Andersen (born 14 December 1954) is a Danish ballet dancer and choreographer. He was principal dancer for the Royal Danish Ballet 1975-1980, for the New York City Ballet 1980-1990, freelancing ballet master 1990-2000 and artistic director of Ballet Arizona 2000-2024.

== Biography ==
=== Early days ===
Born in Copenhagen, Andersen was first exposed to dance through ballroom dancing. At age 7, he was accepted into the Royal Danish Ballet School, which is attached to the Royal Danish Ballet. There he studied with Kirsten Ralov, Hans Brenaa, Flemming Ryberg, and Vera Volkova. He also studied in Germany, France, and the United States, where he took classes at the School of American Ballet. In 1972, at the age of 18, he graduated from the Copenhagen school and was accepted by the Royal Danish Ballet as an apprentice.

=== Royal Danish Ballet ===
After a year as apprentice at the Royal Danish Ballet, Andersen was in 1973 accepted into its corps de ballet and was promoted to principal dancer in 1975, at the age of 20, which made him the youngest principal in the company's history.

At the Royal Danish Ballet, Andersen appeared in leading roles in ballets of the 19th century Danish ballet master August Bournonville, such as Napoli, Flower Festival in Genzano, Far from Denmark, The Kermesse in Bruges and A Folk Tale, as well as in classic ballets such as The Nutcracker, Coppélia and Giselle. He also performed in many modern ballets, creating the role of the Boy in the 1976 revival of Rudi van Dantzig's Monument for a Dead Boy and dancing the part of The Chosen in Glen Tetley's radical interpretation of Igor Stravinsky's Le Sacre du Printemps in 1978.

=== New York City Ballet ===
In 1980, George Balanchine invited him to join the New York City Ballet and he had to learn 35 ballets within the first three months of his tenure. Roles that were created for him by Balanchine included Ballade (1980), Robert Schumann's Davidsbündlertänze (1980), and Mozartiana (1981). Peter Martins and Jerome Robbins also created roles for him in several works.

After suffering a hip injury in 1988, Andersen returned to the stage but eventually decided to retire from New York City Ballet in 1990, giving his final NYCB performance on 29 June 1990 in Balanchine's 1928 Apollo. Altogether, Andersen appeared in some sixty ballets during his ten years with the company.

=== Balanchine répétiteur ===
After his departure from NYCB, Andersen staged works by Balanchine for ballet companies around the world, having been appointed an accredited Balanchine répétiteur by the George Balanchine Trust. He also staged ballets by August Bournonville, Jerome Robbins and others. In 1999 he staged Giselle for Les Grands Ballets Canadiens, and in 2013 he created a new production of The Kermesse in Bruges for the Royal Danish Ballet.

=== Ballet Arizona ===
In 2000, after a brief period as ballet master for Pittsburgh Ballet Theatre, Andersen was appointed artistic director of Ballet Arizona, where he for more than 24 years oversaw a repertory of classical and contemporary ballets and also staged many works by Balanchine. He also created a number of original works for the company. In 2024 he stepped down from the role as artistic director and was appointed Artistic Director Emeritus for the company.

=== Choreographer ===
In 1987, while Andersen was still with NYCB, the Royal Danish Ballet gave him his first choreographic commission, for which he created 1-2-3—1-2. This was followed by other works for a.o. the New York City Ballet, the Slovenian National Theatre Ballet, the Royal Ballet of Flanders, Les Grands Ballets Canadiens and Pacific Northwest Ballet. From 2000 Andersen created a large number of works for Ballet Arizona.

== Selected choreographic works ==
- 1987: 1-2-3—1-2 (music, Schoenberg, J. Strauss Jr., Lizst), Royal Danish Ballet
- 1988: Baroque Variations (music, Foss), New York City Ballet
- 1989: Fête Galante (music, Couperin), Royal Danish Ballet
- 1991: The New World (music, Dvořák), Slovenian National Theater Ballet, Ljubljana
- 1992: Carnaval (music, Schumann, and others), Royal Ballet of Flanders, Antwerp
- 1993: Holberg Suite (music, Grieg), Norwegian National Ballet
- 1993: Simple Symphony (music, Britten), Tokyo
- 1994: Brandenburg Concerti (music, Bach), Pacific Northwest Ballet, Seattle
- 2003: Romeo and Juliet (Prokofiev), Ballet Arizona
- 2004: Mosaik (music, Chopin, Berlioz, Schubert, and others), Ballet Arizona
- 2006: The Nutcracker (music, Tchaikovsky), Ballet Arizona
- 2007: Play (music, Mozart, Schubert, Britten, Pärt, Stravinsky), Ballet Arizona
- 2008: A Midsummer Night's Dream (music, Mendelsohn), Ballet Arizona
- 2008: Dance of the Hours (music, Ponchielli), Ballet Arizona
- 2009: Sueños (music, Massenet, Rossini), Ballet Arizona
- 2010: Diversions (music, Britten), Ballet Arizona
- 2011: Symphonie Classique (music, Prokofiev), Ballet Arizona
- 2011: Cinderella (music, Prokofiev), Ballet Arizona
- 2012: Topia (music, Beethoven), Ballet Arizona
- 2015: Pines of Rome (music, Respighi), Ballet Arizona
- 2016: Round (music, Debussy a.o.), Ballet Arizona
- 2017: Rio (music, Philip Glass), Ballet Arizona
- 2018: Eroica (music, Beethoven), Ballet Arizona
- 2019: The Firebird (music, Stravinsky), Ballet Arizona
- 2021: The Four Seasons (music, Vivaldi), Ballet Arizona
- 2022: Juan Gabriel (music, Juan Gabriel), Ballet Arizona
- 2023: The Rite of Spring (music, Stravinsky), Ballet Arizona
- 2024: Peter and the Wolf (music, Prokofiev), School of Ballet Arizona

== Appearances on video and film ==
Andersen is a featured dancer in the Danish documentary film At Danse Bournonville (English title: Dancing Bournonville, 1979). He appears in leading roles in videos of Balanchine's Robert Schumann's Davidsbündlertänze (1981; The Balanchine Library, Nonesuch, 1995), Mozartiana (1983; PBS, "A New York City Ballet Tribute to George Balanchine"), and A Midsummer Night's Dream (1986), in which he dances the role of Oberon. He also appears in the "Dance in America" television broadcasts of Peter Martins's Concerto for Two Solo Pianos (1983) and Valse Triste (1991) and in archival footage in the documentary film Jerome Robbins: Something to Dance About by Kultur Video in 2008. Many videos of rehearsals and performances with New York City Ballet that can be viewed in the Jerome Robbins Dance Collection of the New York Public Library for the Performing Arts, Andersen can be seen in Balanchine Continued, at Ballet Arizona, part of the "Works and Process" performance series at the Guggenheim Museum in New York City, recorded in November 2004.
