= Margrethe Schanne =

Danish ballet dancer

- Born: Margrethe Sophie Marie Schanne; 21 November 1921; Copenhagen, Denmark
- Died: 9 January 2014 (aged 92); Copenhagen, Denmark
- Education: Royal Danish Ballet school
- Occupations: Ballet dancer; Ballet instructor; Actor
- Years active: 1939–1966
- Spouse: Kjeld Noack (m. 1971)
- Awards: Knight of the Order of the Dannebrog (1953); Tagea Brandt Rejselegat (1962)

Margrethe Sophie Marie Schanne (21 November 1921 – 9 January 2014) was a Danish ballet dancer who performed with the Royal Danish Ballet from 1942 to 1966, firstly as a group dancer and then as a solo dancer. She also performed as a guest of the Ballet des Champs-Élysées and at the Grand Ballet de Marquis de Cuevas. Schanne retired in 1966 to become a ballet instructor and did some acting. In 1953, she was appointed Knight of the Order of the Dannebrog and received the Tagea Brandt Rejselegat in 1962.

== Biography ==
On 21 November 1921, Schanne was born in Copenhagen, Denmark. She was the daughter of the language teacher Jean Baptiste Schanne and Emilie Lind Hansen. Schanne was eight years old when she was admitted to the Royal Danish Ballet school after passing the entrance examination. She was educated at the school from 1930 to 1940 and was taught by Valborg Borchsenius as well as Harald Lander. Schanne made her debut as a ballet dancer on 29 September 1939 in Lander's reconstruction of August Bournonville's The Valkyrie. She went on to perform as the young girl in Rosendrømmen in 1941, May in Tolv med Posten and was the butterfly in Vaaren both in 1942. That same year, Schanne joined the Royal Danish Ballet, as a principal dancer a result of her performance in Vaaren.

She was appointed solo dancer in 1943, and went on to perform in Bournoville's Edouard in 1945. The performance began critical for the remainder of Schanne's career and was allowed to "unfold her entire unusual understanding of the romantic female figure" according to her Anne Middelboe Christensen in Schanne's entry in KVINFO. She travelled to Paris, where she stayed from 1946 to 1947 and studied with the Russian educator Olga Preobrajenska. Schanne was a guest of the Ballet des Champs-Élysées run by Roland Petit in Paris and London 1947. There, she improved her classical dancing style and dramatic characterisation. Schane played the lead of the play La Sylphide between 1945 and 1966. Beginning from 1951, she danced her second major Romanic role in Giselle. Schane danced Night Shadow by George Balanchine from 1955 and portrayed the centre of Pas de Quatre by Anton Dolin.

Schane also played parts Eleonora in Kermesse in Bruges in 1951, Victorine in Konservatoriet in 1953, and Rosita in Far from Denmark in 1956 and 1957 all by Bournoville. From 1955 to 1956, she danced as both Giselle and Sylfiden at the Grand Ballet de Marquis de Cuevas in France. Schane danced the lead role of Medea by Birgit Cullberg in 1959 and went on to perform in Kameliadamen by Kirsten Ralov the following year in a role created specially for her. In 1963, she performed the final major part of her career, the title role in Irene Holm by Elsa-Marianne von Rosen based on a short story by Herman Bang. Schane had roles in Drift by Bjørn Larsen and Stemninger by Hans Brenaa the following year.

In 1966, she retired from the Royal Danish Ballet at the age of 45. Schane worked as a ballet instructor for several years and also did some acting. She portrayed the dying Esther in Arnold Weskers Vennerne in 1970. In 1976, Schane played the role of the dying Engelche Hattemagers in the television programme Barselstuen. She operated her own ballet school for girls in the Gladsaxe Municipality from 1965 to 1986.

== Personal life and death ==
She married fellow ballet dancer Kjeld Noack on 4 September 1971 in Copenhagen. They had no children. On the morning of 9 January 2014, Schanne died in her sleep in Copenhagen.

== Legacy ==
Schanne was appointed Knight of the Order of the Dannebrog in 1953. In 1957, a postage stamp created by Henry Thelander was issued featuring her in a floating sylphic jump and was the first to be issued bearing a dancer in Denmark. Schanne received the Tagea Brandt Rejselegat in 1962.
