= List of productions of Swan Lake derived from its 1895 revival =

This is a list of notable major productions of the ballet Swan Lake. Throughout the long and complex performance history of Swan Lake, the 1895 edition of Marius Petipa, Lev Ivanov, and Riccardo Drigo has served as the definitive version on which nearly every staging has been based, having been mounted by many noted ballet masters and choreographers from the late 19th century until the present day.

== Notable Swan Lake ballets ==
- 1888: Augustin Berger – Prague National Theatre (Act II only)
- 1901: Alexander Gorsky – Bolshoi Ballet, Moscow
- 1907: Achille Viscusi – Prague National Theatre, Prague
- 1910: Mikhail Fokine – Ballets Russes, London
- 1911: Mikhail Mordkin – All Star Imperial Russian Ballet, New York City
- 1933: Agrippina Vaganova with Vladimir Dmitriev and Boris Asafyev – Kirov/Mariinsky Ballet (the former Imperial Ballet), Leningrad
- 1934: Nicholas Sergeyev – Sadler's Wells Ballet (today's Birmingham Royal Ballet), London
- 1936: Harald Lander – Royal Danish Ballet, Copenhagen (one act version)
- 1940: Anton Dolin – Ballet Theatre (American Ballet Theatre), New York City
- 1940: Willam Christensen – San Francisco Ballet, San Francisco
- 1945: Fyodor Lopukhov – Kirov/Mariinsky Ballet, Leningrad
- 1950: Konstantin Sergeyev – Kirov/Mariinsky Ballet, Leningrad
- 1951: Asaf Messerer – Hungarian National Ballet, Budapest Opera
- 1953: Vladimir Bourmeister – Stanislavsky Ballet, Moscow
- 1960: George Balanchine – New York City Ballet (Lev Ivanov's second scene only, 1951), also Tschaikovsky Pas de Deux for City Ballet
- 1963: Dimitri Bouchène – Paris Opera Ballet, Paris
- 1963: John Cranko – Stuttgart Ballet, Stuttgart
- 1963: Robert Helpmann with Sir Frederick Ashton – Royal Ballet, London
- 1964: Rudolf Nureyev – Vienna State Opera Ballet, Vienna
- 1967: David Blair for American Ballet Theatre, Chicago
- 1967: Erik Bruhn – National Ballet of Canada, Toronto
- 1976: Yuri Grigorovich – Ballet of the Bolshoi Theatre, Moscow
- 1976: John Neumeier – Hamburg Ballet, Hamburg
- 1977: Naima Baltacheyeva with Abdurahman Kumisnikov – Hungarian National Ballet, Budapest Opera
- 1981: Mikhail Baryshnikov – American Ballet Theatre, Washington, D.C.
- 1986: Rudolf Nureyev – Paris Opera Ballet, Paris
- 1987: Anthony Dowell with Roland John Wiley – Royal Ballet, London
- 1988: Natalia Kasatkina and Vladimir Vasilyov – Moscow Classical Ballet, Moscow
- 1988: Rudi van Dantzig – Dutch National Ballet
- 1988: Oleg Vinogradov – Kirov Ballet
- 1992: Oleg Vinogradov – Universal Ballet
- 1996: Peter Martins – Royal Danish Ballet
- 1998: Peter Schaufuss – Peter Schaufuss Ballet, Holstebro
- 1998: Birgit Scherzer – Saarländisches Staatstheater, Saarbrücken
- 1999: Peter Martins – New York City Ballet
- 2015: Nikolaj Hübbe and Silja Schandorff – Royal Danish Ballet
- 2018: Liam Scarlett – The Royal Ballet
