= Gitte Lindstrøm =

Danish ballet dancer and ballet teacher (born 1975)

Gitte Lindstrøm (born 1975) is a Danish ballet dancer and ballet teacher. She joined the Royal Danish Ballet in 1992, becoming a principal dancer in 1998.

== Biography ==
After studying at the Royal Danish Ballet School, Lindstrøm became an apprentice with the ballet company in 1992, a member of the corps in 1994 and a soloist in 1997. In 1998, she was promoted to principal dancer.

Lindstrøm's leading roles include those in Onegin, Swan Lake, The Sleeping Beauty, The Nutcracker and Teresina in Bournonville's Napoli. Her Birthe in Bournonville's A Folk Tale was described as "feisty, wacky, tempestuous" with wonderful "wild, high kicking dances and temper tantrums, interspersed with moments of near complete grace". She was considered to have given a "stellar performance" at the world première of Tim Rushton's Requiem in 2006. In 2002, she performed with the New York City Ballet and in 2005 with the Royal Swedish Ballet. She has also performed across Europe as well as in China, Japan, Africa and Brazil. Having reached the age of 40 in July 2015, she has retired as a dancer but continues to teach at the Royal Danish Ballet School.
