= Emma Riis-Kofoed =

Danish ballet dancer

- Born: 24 March 1998 (age 27); Denmark
- Education: Royal Danish Ballet School
- Occupation: Ballet dancer
- Years active: 2017-
- Height: 5 ft 7 in (170 cm)
- Career
- Current group: The Royal Danish Ballet

Emma Riis-Kofoed (born 24 March 1998) is a Danish ballet dancer and principal with the Royal Danish Ballet. A graduate of the Royal Danish Ballet School, she joined the company in 2017 and was promoted to principal dancer in 2022. She is known for her classical technique and critically acclaimed performances in roles such as Odette/Odile in Swan Lake and Kitri in Don Quixote.

== Early life and training ==
Emma Riis-Kofoed was born in 1998 in Denmark. An energetic child, she participated in various activities, including gymnastics. Her interest in ballet was sparked by an annual family tradition of attending performances of The Nutcracker at The Royal Danish Theatre. At age six, she became particularly captivated by the young dancers on stage and she expressed a strong desire to perform herself. Her parents explained the dedication required, to which she responded enthusiastically, deciding to pursue ballet. Riis-Kofoed began ballet lessons at a local school in Helsingør. Within weeks, her teacher recognized her potential and recommended she audition for the Royal Danish Ballet School. Despite starting later than many peers, she was accepted and commenced her formal training in 2006. Initially, she faced challenges, such as understanding instructions given in French, but she embraced the physicality of ballet, the camaraderie with fellow students, and the academic aspects of the school. As she matured, her passion for ballet deepened, leading her to pursue a professional career in dance.

In her final year at the Royal Danish Ballet School, the school restructured its apprentice program, leading to uncertainty about future contracts. Riis-Kofoed auditioned for three leading European companies and was offered a place in two of them, including the Berlin State Ballet, however, Riis-Kofoed remained steadfast in her aspiration to join the Royal Danish Ballet, a decision that ultimately materialized. In 2014 she was offered a contract at the Royal Danish Ballet — a moment she later described as overwhelming and emotional, recalling bursting into tears in front of Nikolaj Hübbe from sheer relief and gratitude, when he offered her a contract.

Riis-Kofoed was part of the first cohort to complete a new three-year upper secondary program jointly run by the Royal Danish Ballet School and Falkonergårdens Gymnasium under the Team Danmark scheme. The program aimed to give dancers a stronger educational foundation. Initially skeptical about balancing school with reduced stage time, Riis-Kofoed later praised the program for enhancing her artistic growth and providing valuable life experience. Upon graduation, she was one of four students to receive a contract with the Royal Danish Ballet in 2017. Her final year at the Royal Danish Ballet School was featured in the 2017 DR documentary series I forreste række (Front Row), which among others followed the then 18-year old Riis-Kofoed. The series captured both the intense preparation for ballet exams and the emotional complexity of competing for limited contracts alongside close friends.

== Career ==
As a part of the corps de ballet Riis-Kofoed was given opportunities to understudy principal parts early in her career, she received widespread acclaim for her breakout performance in Études in 2019, where she danced the lead ballerina role for the first time. Critics highlighted her polish, precision, and her presence was said to "light up the entire theatre". She was promoted to soloist in 2020 at age 24, following standout performances in roles such as "Myrtha" in Giselle. In the years that followed, she performed leading roles in La Sylphide, Jewels, and The Nutcracker. Her promotion to principal dancer came in 2022 after her performance in Diamonds from Jewels. The announcement was made by director Nikolaj Hübbe, who cited her "undeniable dance talent, refinement, and immense love for the artistic process". In his statement, he emphasized that her artistry and dedication made her a significant asset not only to the Royal Danish Ballet, but to classical ballet as a whole.

She has since danced principal roles such as "Kitri" in Don Quixote, "Odette/Odile" in Swan Lake, and the title role in Raymonda.

Throughout her career she has been celebrated for her elegant classical line, enhanced by her naturally tall and slender physique, which lends itself to the long, clean shapes favoured in ballet. Critics have highlighted her strong pointe technique, refinement, and stage presence. In her performance as Raymonda, she was praised for delivering a technically assured and nuanced portrayal, combining regal poise with expressive subtlety.

== Selected repertoire ==
- "Odette/Odile" in Swan Lake by Silja Schandorff and Nikolaj Hübbe.
- "Kitri" in Don Quixote by Marius Petipa/Nikolaj Hübbe.
- "Sugar Plum Fairy" and "Dewdrop" in The Nutcracker by George Balanchine.
- "Raymonda" in Raymonda by Marius Petipa/Nikolaj Hübbe.
- "Ballerina" in Symphony in C by George Balanchine.
- "Sleeping Beauty" in The Sleeping Beauty by Christopher Wheeldon.
- "Ballerina" in Études by Harald Lander.
- "Myrtha" in Giselle by Silja Schandorff and Nikolaj Hübbe.
- "Prudence" in The Lady of the Camellias by John Neumeier.
- "The main couple" in Ballo della Regina by George Balanchine.
- "Emeralds" and "Diamonds" pas de deux in Jewels by George Balanchine.
- "Sanguinic" in The Four Temperaments by George Balanchine.
- "Hippolyta/Titania" in A Midsummer Night's Dream by John Neumeier.
- "Spring" pas de deux in The Four Seasons by Jerome Robbins.

== Awards and recognition ==
Emma Riis-Kofoed has received numerous awards acknowledging her talent and contributions to the art of ballet. She is a recipient of several prestigious Danish grants and prizes, including Queen Ingrid's Honorary Grant, Ole Nørlyngs Talent Price, Roagers Fonds Talent Price, and Nationalbankens Talent Price.

In 2023, she was nominated for Best Dancer at the Reumert Awards, Denmark's premier performing arts honours. That same year, she received international acclaim with the Positano Prize for dance, and was selected for the Queen's Artist Grant, personally awarded by HM Queen Margrethe II.

In recognition of her artistic achievements, Riis-Kofoed has also been named a Knight of the Order of the Dannebrog.
