= Mette Hønningen =

Danish ballet dancer

Inge Mette Hønningen (born 1944) is a classical Danish ballerina who danced in the Royal Danish Ballet until 1992. She starred in Norman Campbell's film Ballerina in 1966. A number of choreographers have created works specially for her, in particular Alvin Ailey who dedicated Witness to her in 1986.

== Biography ==
Born in the Frederiksberg district of Copenhagen on 3 October 1944, Mette Hønningen is the daughter of the fruit merchant Karl Emil Hønningen (1903–74) and Agnes Elvira Madsen (1906–91). After a few years at Ole Palle Hansen's dancing school, she entered the Royal Theatre's ballet school when she was 12. She began to blossom four years later under Vera Volkova who had every confidence in her talents and adopted a less hasty approach to her development.

By the time of her 1964 début as the pupil in Flemming Flindt's Enetime (The Private Lesson), she had already been selected to star in the Disney film Ballerina which premiered in 1965. During filming, she met the German television producer Thomas Grimm whom she married.

In 1967, she became a soloist and in 1976, principal at the Royal Ballet. She demonstrated her abilities as a Bournonville dancer in Napoli (1963) and Sylfiden (1976) but she is remembered above all for her performances in modern ballet, frequently dancing barefoot. From the late 1960s, she starred in works by the American choreographer Glen Tetley, including Pierrot Lunaire (1968), Greening and Voluntaires (1978), and The Firebird (1981). She also danced in works choreographed by Alvin Ailey: Memoria (1981), Caverna magica and, above all, the nine-minute Witness which he created specially for her in 1986. Hønningen is considered to be one of the most beautiful classical dancers engaged by the Royal Theatre in recent generations.

In the 1970s, Høonningen began to suffer from problems with her back. For her 25th anniversary with the Royal Theatre in 1987, which was also a kind of leaving celebration, she danced the three most important works of her career: Witness, Caverna magica and Harald Lander's Études. Thereafter she was increasingly afflicted with back problems, leading her to retire from the Royal Theatre in 1992. In the late 1990s, she introduced Silja Schandorff and Mette Bødtcher to the Witness sequence.

== Awards ==
In 1974, she was honoured as a Knight of the Dannebrog and in 1976, she received the Tagea Brandt Rejselegat.
