= Frank Andersen =

Danish ballet dancer

Frank Andersen (born 15 April 1953 in Copenhagen) is a former Danish ballet dancer who was twice artistic director of the Royal Danish Ballet. He has been an influential supporter of the Danish choreographer August Bournonville.

== Biography ==
Andersen was trained at the Royal Danish Ballet from the age of seven. He also studied under Vera Volkova, Stanley Williams and Nora Kiss. He first danced with the company in 1971 and became a solo dancer in 1977. In 1976, supported by Dinna Bjørn, he was the originator of the Bournonville Group which danced around the world presenting Bournonville's ballets. His first term as artistic director of the Royal Danish Ballet was from 1985–1994. From 1995–1999, he was the artistic director of the Royal Swedish Ballet and from 2002–2008 he was again artistic director of the Royal Danish Ballet. He has directed several productions of August Bournonville's ballets. Since 1997, he has been an advisor to the National Ballet of China, visiting the People’s Republic on many occasions. His dancing has been qualified as conveying love of life, humour and charm in roles such as Geert in The Kermesse in Bruges, Gurn in La Sylphide, Frants in Coppélia, and Puck in John Neumeier's A Midsummer Night's Dream (1980).

In 2010, Andersen, together with his wife Eva Kloborg, also a ballet dancer and choreographer, instructed a group of Vietnamese dancers from the Vietnam National Opera & Ballet in Bournonville's ballet. This culminated in major presentations at the Hanoi Opera House on 29 and 30 May 2010 with performances of Conservatory (1849) and Flower Festival in Genzano (1858).

In 2010 and 2013 he was a head of the jury at the Prix de Lausanne ballet competition.

In 2015, Frank Andersen held the position of a lecture at the Scandinavian Heritage Foundation.

== Bournonville productions ==
- Napoli, Monte Carlo Ballet (1988)
- A Folk Tale, Royal Danish Ballet (1991)
- La Sylphide, National Ballet of China and Royal Swedish Ballet (1999)

== Honours ==
- Knight of the Order of the Dannebrog, first grade
- Prize of Honor, Berlingske Foundation (2000)
- The Dance Magazine Award (2002)
- Margot Lander's Grant of Honor (2003)
