= Ludvig Gade =

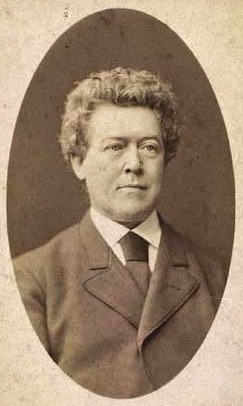

Ludvig Gade (born 16 April 1823 in Copenhagen–7 April 1897 in Copenhagen) was a Danish dancer and mime. Ludvig Gade was Director of Royal Danish Ballet 1877–1890.

== Biography ==
Gade entered the Royal Danish Theater school at an early age. He made his first stage appearance as a ballet child in 1836 in Hermann von Unna and gave his official debut on 8 January 1844 in Festival in Albano. His tall and powerful figure made him better suited to mime than to dance, and it was in character roles that he found his true strength. His range extended from the deeply tragic to boldly comic. Among his notable roles were Corporal Nouveau in Bellman, King Svend in" Valdemar, Knight Mogens in A Folk Tale, Servant of Mountain Ground, and the Bear in" Valkyrie ". a role widely considered his finest performance.

In addition to his position as a dancer in ballet staff, he also had other tasks at the theater. In the 1857–1858 season, he was appointed as a stage director for the opera, during August Bournonville's leaves he served several times as a ballet conductor. After Bournonville's death in 1879, he took over the leadership of the Danish ballet. He retired from the Royal Danish Theatre at the end of the in 1889–1890 season, but later performed a few times as a guest of Harald Wartooth's role in 'Valkyrie'.

Gade became Knight of Dannebrog in 1886 and is buried in Assistants Cemetery . There is a painting of him by COJ Lund at the Royal Theatre as well as a woodcut of O. Andersen modelled after Lund's photograph.
