= Poul Gnatt =

Danish dancer and balletmaster active in New Zealand

Poul Rudolph Gnatt QSO (24 March 1923 – 15 October 1995) was a Danish dancer and balletmaster active in New Zealand.

== Childhood ==
Gnatt was born in Baden, Austria. His father was Kai Gnatt, flower merchant, and his mother Kaja Olsen, both from Denmark, to which they returned from Austria with Poul and his sister Kirsten six years after his birth, whereupon the children entered the ballet school of the Royal Danish Ballet. Brother and sister entered the parent company upon their graduation in 1939.

== Career ==
=== Early career ===
Gnatt achieved acclaim for his Coppélia, Sleeping Beauty, Le Spectre de la Rose and La Sylphide. During the Second World War, still in the ballet company, Gnatt worked with the Resistance as liaison for British special operations parachutists. After the war he joined Roland Petit's Ballets des Champs-Elysées in Paris, then the Metropolitan Ballet in London, where he met his longtime collaborator Harry Haythorne. His first marriage having ended in divorce, Gnatt married Rigmor Strøyberg in Copenhagen on 18 September 1951. That year he joined the Borovansky Ballet, which regularly toured New Zealand (and which he would later lead under its new name, The Australian Ballet.) The following year he, Rigmor and their young sons moved to Auckland to teach ballet classes.

=== New Zealand ===
Gnatt and New Zealand ballet teachers Beryl Nettleton and Bettina Edwards performed at the Playhouse Theatre (Note: in Karangahape Road; later renamed the Mercury Theatre) and in His Majesty's Theatre, Queen Street, which led to lecture-demonstrations with a quartet of dancers, starting with tours to rural centres in the North Island sponsored by the Community Arts Service of Auckland University College. In 1953 Gnatt established the New Zealand Ballet and directed it until 1962. He was famously photographed in the sand dunes at Te Henga / Bethells Beach in 1954, alongside dancer Julie Barker.

Dancers to come out of the company included Jon Trimmer, Russell Kerr, Rowena Jackson and Sara Neil. His sister, Kirsten Ralov, and her husband, Fredborn Bjornsson, visited in 1962 to dance in Bournonville's Napoli, its first production outside Denmark.

The company's board, however, appointed a new director that year. Gnatt joined The Australian Ballet as balletmaster. He returned as interim director of the New Zealand Ballet from 1969 to 1971 and subsequently co-founded the Dance Theatre of the Philippines.

Gnatt died in Ōtaki, New Zealand, on 15 October 1995. He was the father of Fin Gnatt, sports and news anchor on Norwegian TV 2.

== Honours and awards ==
In the 1983 Queen's Birthday Honours, Gnatt was appointed a Companion of the Queen's Service Order for community service. In 1994, he was conferred with an honorary Doctor of Literature degree by Victoria University of Wellington.

In 1998, the Royal New Zealand Ballet's principal studio was named in Gnatt's honour when it moved into the refurbished St James Theatre in Wellington.
