= Kizzy Matiakis =

English ballet dancer

- Born: Kizzy Howard; 1981 (age 44–45)
- Education: Central School of Ballet
- Occupation: ballet dancer
- Years active: 2000–present
- Spouse: Tim Matiakis
- Career
- Current group: Royal Danish Ballet
- Former groups: Royal Swedish Ballet

Kizzy Matiakis (née Howard, born 1981) is an English ballet dancer who was previously a principal dancer with the Royal Danish Ballet.

Matiakis studied ballet with Leo Kersley, then at the Central School of Ballet in London. She graduated in 2000, then joined the Royal Swedish Ballet immediately. In 2003, she moved to Copenhagen to join the Royal Danish Ballet. She became a soloist in 2008 and was promoted to principal dancer in 2016. In 2020, she was nominated for the Reumert Prize Best Dancer for her performance in Blixen.

Matiakis originally planned to retire in Spring 2021 with her farewell performance being Blixen. However, due to her pregnancy, she gave her final performance as Madge in La Sylphide on 14 November 2020.

Kizzy Matiakis is married to Tim Matiakis, also a dancer.
