= Ballerina (1966 film) =

- Written by: Casey Robinson; Peter Schnitzler; Robert Westerby
- Directed by: Norman Campbell
- Starring: Mette Hønningen; Kirsten Simone; Astrid Villaume; Poul Reichhardt
- Music by: Henning Schreiter
- Country of origin: United States
- Original language: English

Production
- Producers: Bill Anderson; Peter V. Herald
- Cinematography: Günther Anders; Rolf Rønne
- Running time: 60 minutes
- Production company: Walt Disney Productions

Original release
- Network: NBC
- Release: February 27, 1966

Ballerina also known as The Copenhagen Ballet is a 1966 made-for-television produced by Walt Disney Productions, the film was directed by Norman Campbell and follows the story of a young girl Mette Sorensen (played by Mette Hønningen) who aspires to be a dancer with the Royal Danish Ballet, against the wishes of her mother but with the support of her musician father and her mentor, the famous ballerina Kirsten Holm (played by Kirsten Simone). The film premiered on NBC on February 27, 1966 as part of Walt Disney's Wonderful World of Color.

== Plot ==
The story opens with Mette greeting Kirsten at the airport following the latter's return from a successful dance tour. They ride into the city together where Kirsten notices that Mette is slightly down-hearted about her own progress at ballet school. She soon gathers from the Ballet Master, and Madame Karova, Mette's teacher, that all is not well and Mette is not showing the promise she had originally displayed. The audience then learns that Mette's mother is against her pursuing a career as a ballerina, wanting her instead to settle down with her boyfriend Sven.

With Kirsten's backing, Mette secures a place at the Royal Danish ballet ('the company') and takes a small, solo part in Swan Lake, in which she excels. Kirsten is then asked to go to London at short notice, leaving the Ballet Master without a female lead soloist for Coppelia. Kirsten recommends Mette for the part. The remaining part of the film follows Mette's rehearsals and the various ups and downs on the path towards the finale of Coppelia and her arrival as the company's newest star. A young Jenny Agutter also stars as a pupil at the ballet school who turns to Mette for guidance and mentorship.
