= Juliette Price =

Danish ballet dancer

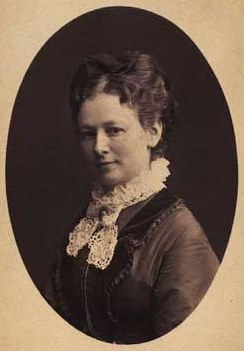
Juliette Price

Elise Juliette Christiane Price, usually known as Juliette Price, (1831–1906) was a Danish ballet dancer. She studied under August Bournonville, becoming his favourite dancer.

== Early years ==
Born in Copenhagen, Price was the daughter of the mimic Adolf Price and the dancer Flora Mathilde Henriette Lewin, both of English origin. She was the oldest of six children. Two of her siblings, Sophie and Waldemar, also became ballet dancers. A member of a family of street entertainers, Price started performing with her parents when she was six and grew up in an environment of performance and dance.

In 1847, her father asked ballet master August Bournonville to take Bjørn as a student in order to prepare her for becoming a member of the Royal Ballet. Recognizing her artistic potential and showing no concern for her social background, he recommended her to the ballet. As a result, she entered the ballet school in 1848. After Andrea Krætzmer, Lucile Grahn-Young and Augusta Nielsen, Juliette Bjørn became Bournonville's fourth outstanding soloist.

== Career ==
In 1849, at the age of 17, Price made her début as Eliza in Bournonville's The Conservatory. The same year, she played the title role in La Sylphide, in 1850 she was Céleste in The Torreador and, in 1851, she became a soloist. Bournonville appreciated the harmony of her movements and considered her lack of sensuality a distinct advantage. Her cool, noble composure matched his idea of a perfect dancer. Among the numerous roles he created for her were Eleonore in The Kermesse in Bruges, Ragnhild in The Wedding Festival in Hardanger, Hilda in A Folk Tale, Rosa in Flower Festival in Genzano and Rosita in Far from Denmark.

She spent a year in Vienna (1855–56) but without success. However, on returning to Copenhagen, she was enthusiastically acclaimed for her performance in La Ventana. Her career came to an end in 1865 when she slipped and was seriously injured during a performance of Kermesse in Bruges. From the age of 35, she spent the rest of her life as an invalid.

== Literature ==
- Neiiendam, Klaus; Lehmann, Edvard (1994). Romantikkens teater i Danmark: belyst gennem Edvard Lehmanns scenetegninger : skuespil og ballet (in Danish). Selskabet for Dansk Teaterhistorie. ISBN 978-87-982781-5-3.
