= Caroline Baldwin =

American and Danish ballet dancer (born 1990)

- Born: 1990 (age 35–36)
- Citizenship: Denmark; United States
- Education: Whitney M. Young Magnet High School
- Occupation: Principal Ballerina
- Years active: 2009–present
- Spouse: Christian Baldwin Hammeken
- Career
- Current group: Royal Danish Ballet

Caroline Baldwin (born 1990) is an American and Danish ballet dancer who is currently a principal dancer with the Royal Danish Ballet in Copenhagen.

== Early life and education ==
Baldwin was raised in Chicago, Illinois. She attended her first ballet class at age 11, and later trained at the Faubourg School of Ballet, while attending high school, and attended summer intensives at Houston Ballet, San Francisco Ballet School, School of American Ballet in New York City and The Royal Ballet School in London.

== Career ==
In 2007, at age 17, Baldwin competed at the Youth America Grand Prix, and was spotted by the Royal Danish Ballet, and was invited to take classes with the company in Copenhagen.

In 2009, she became an apprentice with the company, and was promoted to the corps de ballet later that year. She was named soloist in 2013, and as a soloist, she danced Odette/Odile in Swan Lake, and returned to the U.S. to dance August Bournonville's works.

In 2017, she became a principal dancer. As of 2019, she is one of the four American principal dancers in the company. She had also performed for Queen Margrethe II.

In 2021 Caroline was knighted by the Danish Queen for her outstanding contribution to the art of ballet.
