= Amy Watson =

American ballet dancer (born 1981)

Amy Watson (born 12 May 1981 in Oceanside, California) is the artistic director of the Royal Danish Ballet and a former American ballet dancer. She joined the Royal Danish Ballet in 2000, becoming a principal dancer in 2007. In 2011, she was honoured with the prestigious Order of the Dannebrog, and in 2021 made a Knight 1. Class. In October 2021 she retired as a professional dancer. On 31 October 2024, Watson was appointed artistic director of the Royal Danish Ballet, replacing Nikolaj Hübbe.

== Early life ==
Watson was born on 12 May 1981 in Oceanside, California. As her father was in the military, the family were frequently on the move. While in England, she spent two years at the Royal Academy of Dance before attending a summer course with the Richmond Ballet in Virginia when she was 12. In Fredericksburg, Virginia, she attended courses with Avery Ballet. She was also taught by George Balanchine dancers in Chautauqua, N.Y., after which she studied at the Pacific Coast Ballet Company in California. When she was 15, she attended the School of American Ballet in New York.

== Career ==
In 1998, Watson was selected to attend a three-week course given by Suzanne Farrell in Washington. She performed so well that Farrell signed her up to go on tour with her ballet company where she remained for the next two years. In July 2000, she was invited to join the Royal Danish Ballet in Copenhagen where she became a soloist in 2003 and a principal dancer in 2007.

Her leading roles have included Aurora in The Sleeping Beauty, Odette/Odile in Swan Lake, Kitri and Mercedes in Don Quixote, Teresina in Bournonville's Napoli, and Olga in Onegin. She has also performed in modernistic works such as The Cage, Chroma and Ohad Naharin's Minus 7. Her role as Anita in West Side Story Suite also required her to sing. Although her brother is a Broadway performer, she found it quite a challenge.

In early 2014, Watson became an exchange artist with the American Ballet Theatre where she debuted with Myrta in Giselle in Minneapolis.

She ended her career in October 2021, dancing the role of Lady Capulet in John Neumeier's Romeo and Juliet.

== Appointment as artistic director ==
On 31 October 2024, Watson was appointed artistic director of the Royal Danish Ballet, effective 1 November 2024, replacing Nikolaj Hübbe. The New York Times reported she commented: "This theater gave me a second homeland and a wonderful career that I could have never dreamed of. I want to serve in the highest capacity for the theater and to give back.”

== Family ==
Watson is married to the writer Daniel Tafdrup (born 1983) with whom she has two children: Hazel (2019) and Woody (2023).

== Awards ==
Shortly after Queen Margrethe II had seen her dancing Swan Lake in 2011, she was honoured with the Order of the Dannebrog.
