= Dinna Bjørn =

Danish ballet dancer and choreographer

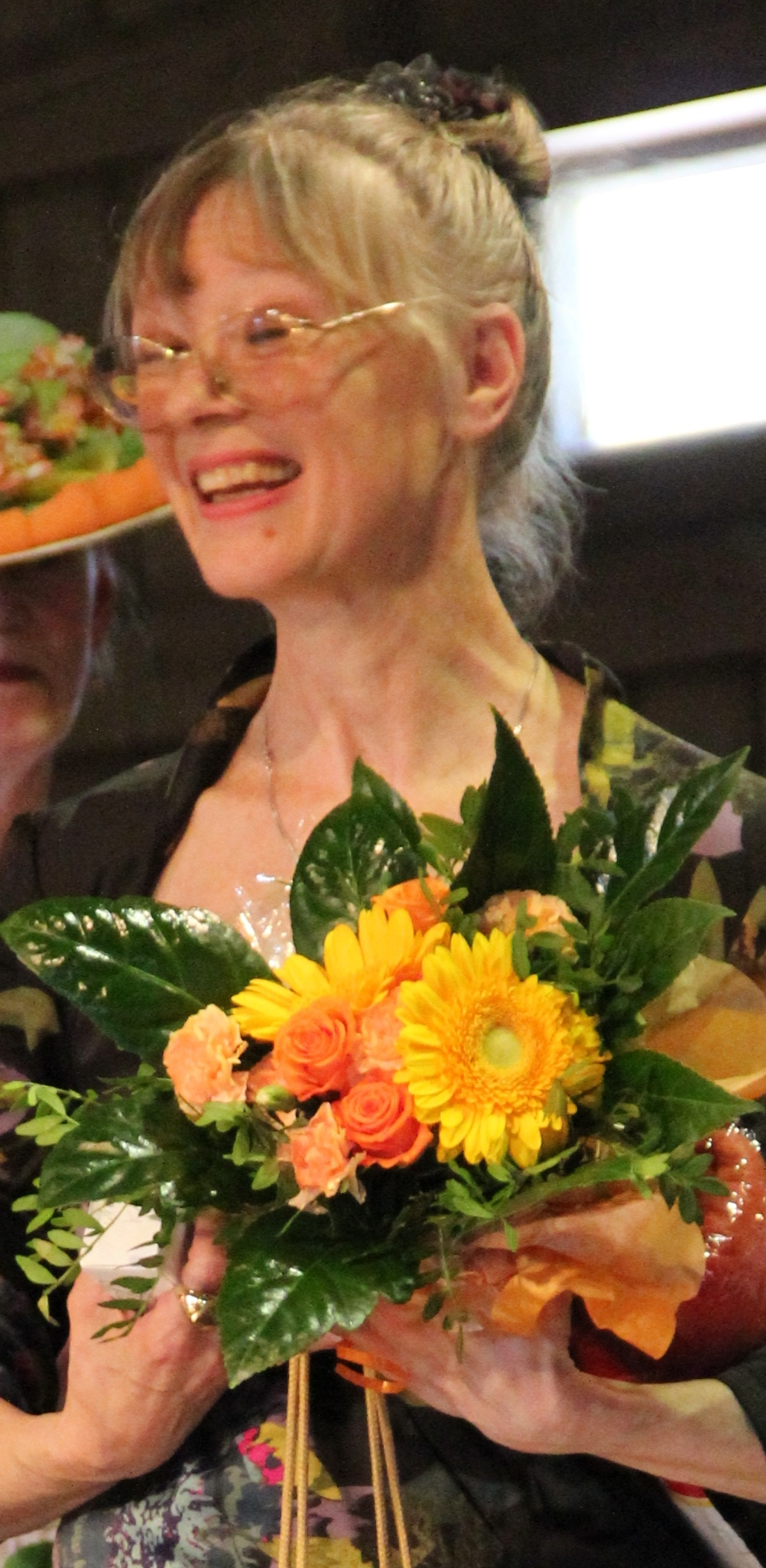
- Dinna Bjørn in 2012
- Born: February 14, 1947 (age 78); Copenhagen, Denmark
- Occupation(s): Ballet dancer Choreographer
- Years active: 1971-present
- Spouse: Eric Viudes
- Career
- Current group: Finnish National Ballet
- Former groups: Norwegian National Ballet; Royal Danish Ballet

Dinna Bjørn (born 14 February 1947) is a Danish ballet dancer and choreographer. She has specialized dancing and directing the ballets of August Bournonville. Bjørn has also created five Hans Christian Andersen ballets for the Pantomime Theatre in Copenhagen's Tivoli.

== Early life ==
Born in Copenhagen, she is the daughter of the concert pianist Elvi Henriksen and of ballet master Niels Bjørn Larsen. When she was nine she danced at the Pantomime Theatre in the Tivoli Gardens. She studied privately under Hans Brenaa and later under prima ballerina Edite Feifere Frandsen from Latvia who trained her using the Vaganova method.

== Career ==
=== Dancing ===
On entering the Royal Danish Ballet School, she learned the techniques of Bournonville ballet with such ease that she immediately joined the company, making her début in 1966 when she was 16 in Jerome Robbins' (Afternoon of a Faun). She also performed in David Lichine's Graduation Ball. Her real breakthrough came in 1971 when she danced Clara in The Nutcracker, specially choreographed for her by Flemming Flindt.

Bjørn has performed particularly well in a number of Bournonville's ballets, including the title role in La Sylphide and Eleonore and Johanna in Kermes in Bruges. Among other principal roles were the First Pas de deux in Rudi van Dantzig's Vier Letzte Lieder and the title role in Michel Fokine's Petrushka. She also performed Cinderella in Norfolk, Virginia, and Giselle at the 1988 Odense Festival.

=== Teaching ===
From 1975, Bjørn began to teach, both at the Royal Theatre's ballet school and on summer courses with Birger Bartholm. She has also conducted Bournonville classes in North and South America, in Asia and throughout Europe, helping to spread the tradition. She headed Frank Andersen's Bournonville Group from 1985 until it was dissolved in 1989. Bjørn is now the patron of honor of the European School of ballet in Amsterdam teaching regularly Bournonville’s repertoire.

=== Choreography ===
Even as a young dancer, Bjørn began to work as a choreographer at the Royal Theatre, beginning with the ballet 8+1, for which she composed the music herself, followed by Sommerfuglemasken (1975) and Hat-Trick (1985). In 1971, she choreographed Anatomisk safari with music by Per Nørgård at Copenhagen's Det Ny Teater. It was the beginning of an extended period of cooperation with Nørgård from 1976 to 1982 during which, together with her Dinna Bjørns Dansegruppe and the percussion band Sol og Måne, she choreographed divertimenti for his works. These included Den tredje tilstand, Wölfli revy, Det guddommelige tivoli, and Siddharta. As a choreographer, she has also created five Hans Christian Andersen ballets for Tivoli's Pantomime Theatre for which Queen Margrethe designed the décor and costumes. They are Kærlighed i skarnkassen (Love in the Dustbin, 2001), Thumbelina (2005), Fyrtøjet (The Tinderbox, 2007), Svinedrengen (The Swineherd, 2009) and Den standhaftige Tinsoldat (The Steadfast Tin Soldier, 2013).

=== Director ===
In 1990, she was appointed artistic director of the Norwegian National Ballet, for whom she choreographed a new production of The Nutcracker, and in 2001, she became ballet mistress for the Finnish National Ballet. From 1997 to 2000, she was also Bournonville Consultant for the Royal Danish Ballet. She has gained a reputation as an international authority on Bournonville.

== Awards ==
Dinna Bjørn has received the Danish Order of the Dannebrog, the Finnish Order of The White Rose, and the Royal Norwegian Order of Merit.
