= Kirsten Simone =

Danish ballerina (1934–2024)

- Born: 1 July 1934; Copenhagen, Denmark
- Died: 19 December 2024 (aged 90)
- Occupation: Ballet dancer

Kirsten Simone (1 July 1934 – 19 December 2024) was a Danish ballerina. She studied at the Royal Danish Ballet School with Vera Volkova and joined the Royal Danish Ballet Company in 1952. She became their first soloist in 1966. She created roles in Flemming Flindt's The Three Musketeers (1966), Elsa-Marianne von Rosen's Don Juan (1967) and Harald Lander's Fête polonaise (1970). She was a guest artist with several companies including the American Ballet Theatre and London Festival Ballet. Since her retirement she taught at the Royal Danish Ballet School.

Simone stars as a mentor to a young ballerina in the 1966 film Ballerina.

She was awarded the Ingenio et Arti medal in 2001.

Simone died on 19 December 2024, at the age of 90.
