= Ulla Poulsen =

Danish ballerina and actress (1905–2001)

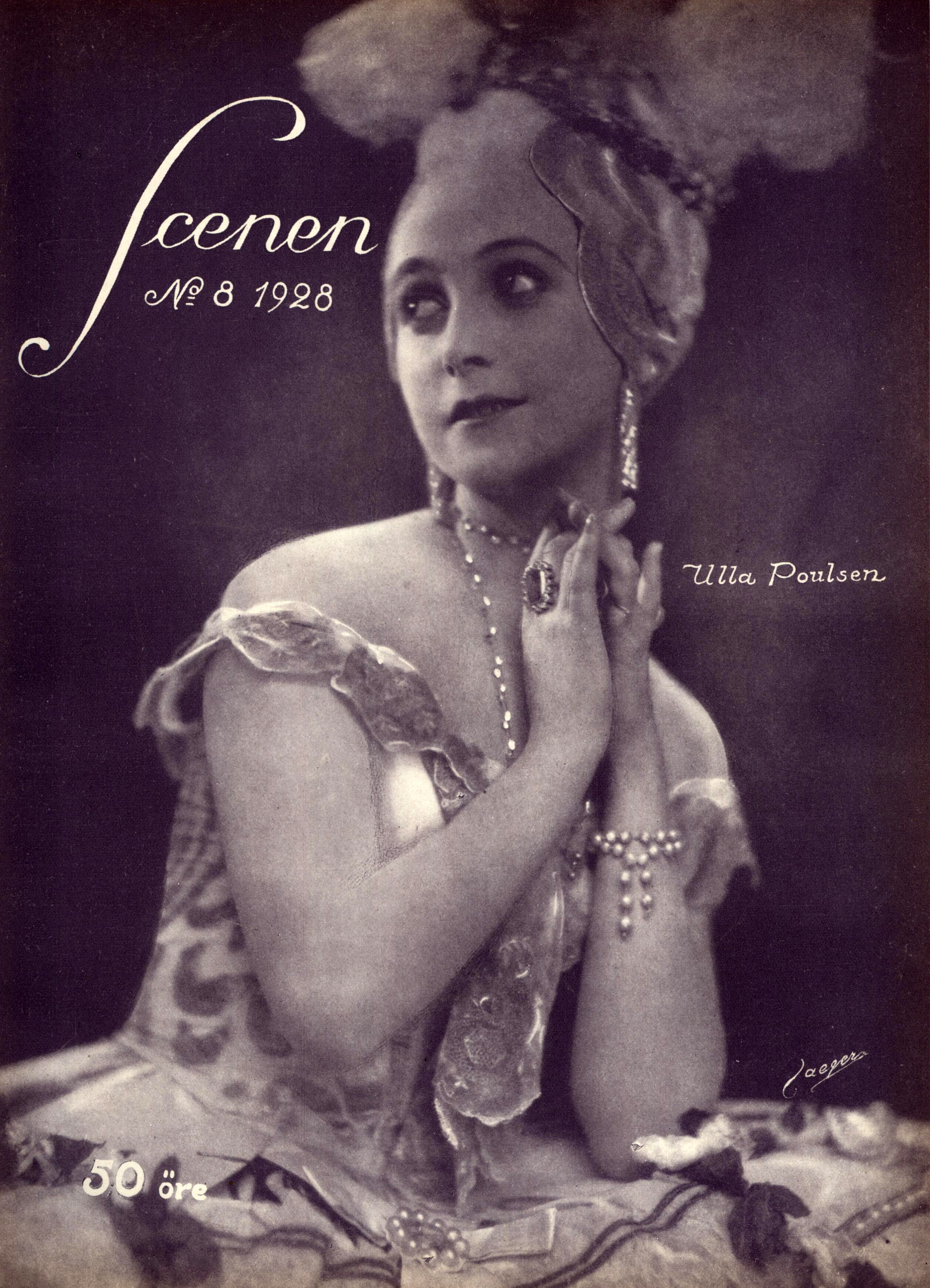
- Poulsen in 1928
- Born: Ulla Britta Iversen; 5 February 1905; Copenhagen, Zealand, Kingdom of Denmark
- Died: 21 April 2001 (aged 96); Aalborg, North Jutland, Kingdom of Denmark
- Education: Royal Danish Ballet School
- Occupations: Ballet dancer, actress
- Spouse(s): Johannes Poulsen; Baron Christian Rosenørn-Lehn; Helge Nordahl Skou
- Dancing career
- Former groups: Royal Danish Ballet

Ulla Poulsen Skou (née Iversen; 5 February 1905 – 21 April 2001), formerly Baroness Ulla Rosenørn-Lehn, was a Danish ballerina and actress. She was a soloist at the Royal Danish Ballet and is best known for being the subject of a series of portraits by Gerda Wegener.

== Biography ==
Ulla Iversen was born on 5 February 1905 in Copenhagen to Søren Iversen and Laura Christiane Hansen.

In 1913, she was admitted into the Royal Danish Ballet School and trained in the Bournonville method. She made her debut with the Royal Danish Ballet in 1921 as Agnete in Agnete og Havmanden. She officially joined the company two years later, in 1923, and was promoted to the rank of soloist in 1924. As a soloist, she danced many lead roles including Sylphide in La Sylphide.

Poulsen was a friend and model for the artist Gerda Wegener, who painted a series of portraits of her. The most famous of these portraits is the 1927 painting titled Ulla Poulsen in the ballet Chopiniana.

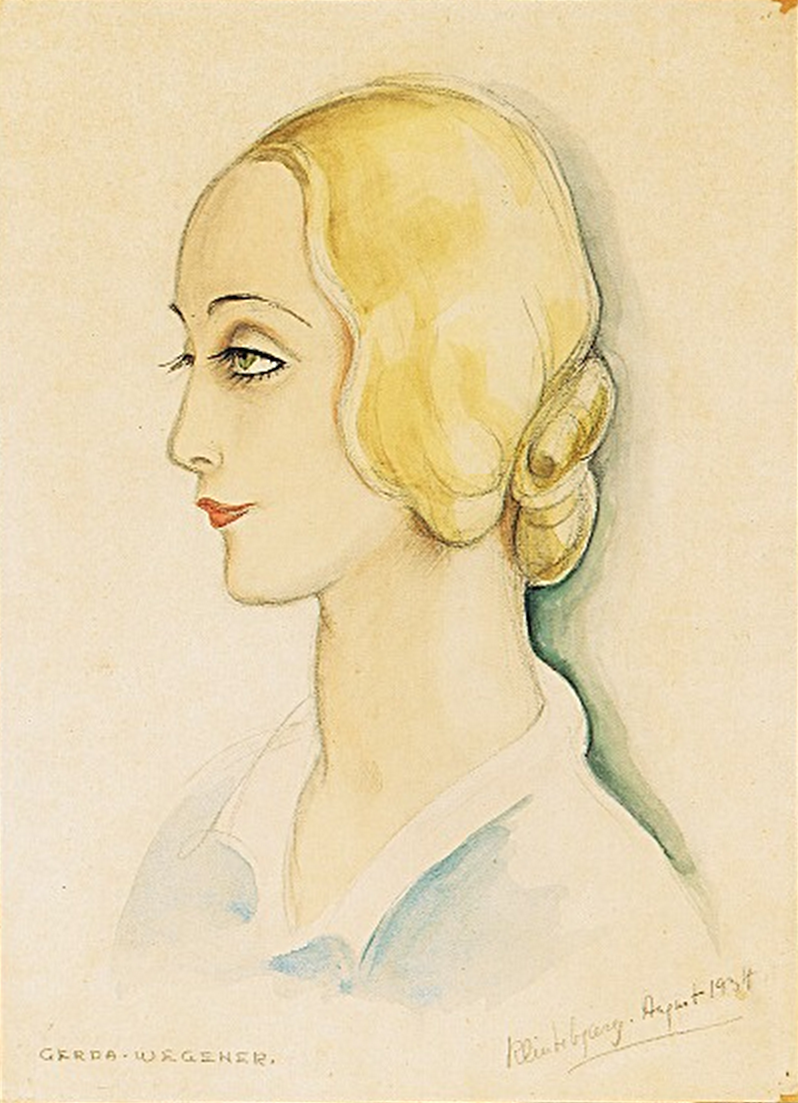
A 1934 portrait of Poulsen by Gerda Wegener

She married three times. Her first husband was Danish actor and director Johannes Poulsen, the nephew of Olaf Poulsen. She starred as Queen Titania in his production of A Midsummer Night's Dream and choreographed his 1936 production of Jedermann. She later married Baron Christian Carl Otto Rosenørn-Lehn, a member of the Danish nobility. Her third marriage was to Helge Nordhal Skou.

Poulsen had roles in the 1937 film Den kloge Mand, the 1938 film Balletten danser, and in the 1970s-1980s television series Matador.

In 1938, Poulsen was a recipient of the Tagea Brandt Rejselegat for significant contributions to Danish art.

Poulsen died on 21 April 2001 in Aalborg, Denmark. She was buried at Almen Kirkegård.

== Popular culture ==
Poulsen is portrayed by Amber Heard in the 2015 film The Danish Girl. In this film, Poulsen is erroneously depicted as being the friend who was instrumental in bringing to life the "Danish Girl" - the new female persona of the main character Lili Elbe. Poulsen, as played by Heard, arrives late for a modeling session requiring Elbe to fill in, wearing female clothing for the first time which sparks previously unacknowledged desires and Poulsen is shown naming Elbe's feminine self "Lili". In reality, the tardy model was Anna Larssen, an actress and friend, not Ulla Poulsen.
