= Metropolitan Ballet =

Defunct British ballet company

Metropolitan Ballet was a short-lived British ballet company. Founded in 1947 by Cecelia Blatch and Leon Hepner, the company performed in London and on tour in the provinces and abroad, staging shortened versions of the classics, some of the Diaghilev ballets, and new works by Victor Gsovsky (who was the company's first ballet master), Andrée Howard, Frank Staff and John Taras.

The company's dancers included David Adams, Poul Gnatt, Sonia Arova, Colette Marchand and the 16-year-old Svetlana Beriosova. Guest artists included Alexandra Danilova, Erik Bruhn, Henry Danton, Frederic Franklin and Léonide Massine.

The company disbanded at the end of 1949 after a final televised performance of Coppélia Act 2 and Pleasuredrome on Dec. 19th whereupon its dancers dispersed. Beriosova joined Sadler's Wells Theatre Ballet, moving to the Covent Garden branch of the company in 1952 where she stayed until her retirement in 1975.
