= Gerda Karstens =

Danish ballet dancer

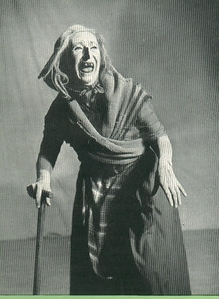
Gerda Karstens (1951)

Gerda Elisabeth Karstens (9 July 1903 – 13 June 1988) was a Danish ballet dancer with the Royal Danish Theatre where she became a soloist in 1942. She is remembered in particular for her interpretations of Madge in Bournonville's La Sylphide and the headmistress in David Lichine's Graduation Ball. She performed these two roles during her retirement evening in 1956, after which she spent several years teaching mime.

== Biography ==
Born in Copenhagen on 9 July 1903, Gerda Elisabeth Karstens was the daughter of the manufacturer Johan Emil Karstens (died 1958) and Kirsti Eleonora Thovaldine Andersen (died 1957). She married the ballet dancer Svend Karlo Karlog (1900–1972).

In 1910, she joined the Royal Theatre's dance school where she was trained in the Bournonville style by Hans Beck. She made her début in 1920, being promoted as a character dancer in 1935 and a soloist in 1942. Thanks to her distinctive features, she was given dramatic character roles in works such as Vincenzo Galeotti's Amors og Balletmesterens Luner. Her most successful roles included Venus in Nini Theilade's Psyche and Pecunia in her Cirklen. She received particular acclaim as Veronica in Napoli and Madge in La Sylphide. She retired officially in 1956 but returned in 1971 to dance in Flemming Flindt's The Triumph of Death.

After her retirement from the stage, she spent several years training the ballet school's pupils in mime.

Gerda Karstens died in Copenhagen on 13 June 1988.

== Awards and honours ==
In 1951, she was honoured with the Ingenio et arti medal.
