= Vera Volkova =

Russian ballerina (1905–1975)

- Born: May 31, 1905 near Tomsk, Russian Empire
- Died: May 5, 1975 (aged 69); Copenhagen, Denmark
- Occupations: ballet dancer and teacher

Vera Volkova (Russian: Bepa Boлкoвa; (31 May 1905 – 5 May 1975) was a Russian ballet dancer and expatriate dance teacher.

Born near Tomsk, she trained at Petrograd's Akim Volynsky's School of Russian Ballet with Maria Romanova (the mother of Galina Ulanova). She also studied with the renowned Russian ballet mistress Agrippina Vaganova, and is credited with popularising the Vaganova method in the West. She danced professionally with various ensembles such as the GATOB (1925–1929) and the Flying Russian Ballet before defecting in 1929. She defected in Shanghai as she was hopeful she could join Diaghilev's Ballets Russes. When she heard of his death, she decided to stay in China where she danced with George Goncharov, and later opened a ballet school in Hong Kong.

In 1936 she and her husband, the architect Hugh Finch Williams, moved to London where she opened another ballet school. In 1943, she gave up dancing and opened a studio in Knightsbridge, and then in West Street in the West End. She spent a number of years teaching at the Sadler's Wells Ballet and Sadler's Wells Ballet School, training some of the leading ex English dancers of the 20th century. She also taught at the Ballet School of the La Scala Theatre in Milan. She became a permanent teacher at the Royal Danish Ballet school in the 1950s, again training some of the school's greatest dancers.

== Students ==
- Carla Fracci, former Principal of Italian La Scala theatre
- Alicia Alonso, Cuban Prima Ballerina Assoluta and founder of the Cuban National Ballet
- Erik Bruhn, former Principal of the Royal Danish Ballet
- Henry Danton, former Soloist of the Sadler's Wells Ballet
- Dame Margot Fonteyn, English Prima Ballerina Assoluta of The Royal Ballet
- Henning Kronstam, former Principal of the Royal Danish Ballet
- Dame Gillian Lynne, former Principal of The Royal Ballet, now a musical theatre choreographer
- Peter Martins, former Principal of the Royal Danish Ballet and New York City Ballet
- Sir Peter Wright, former Principal dancer and artistic director of Birmingham Royal Ballet
- Eva Evdokimova, international guest dancer, recognised as a Prima Ballerina Assoluta
- Sir Kenneth MacMillan, artistic director of the Royal Ballet in London between 1970 and 1977

== Bibliography ==
- Alexander Meinertz (2007). Vera Volkova, a biography. Alton, Hampshire: Dance Books. p. 186. ISBN 978-1-85273-111-3.
- Camille Hardy (May 2008), "Vera Volkova Revealed, A Biography, By Alexander Meinertz", Dance Chronicle, vol. 31, no. 2, pp. 279–284, doi:10.1080/01472520802118525, S2CID 191315445
