= Anna Doneva =

Bulgarian choreographer and dance teacher

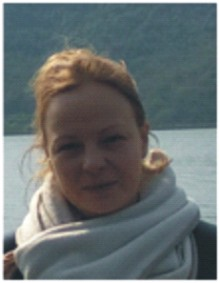
- Born: Anna Doneva; Sofia, Bulgaria; Bulgaria
- Occupations: Dancer, dance educator, choreographer

Anna Doneva (Bulgarian: Анна Донева) is a Bulgarian choreographer and contemporary dance teacher.

== Early life and education ==
Doneva was born in Sofia, Bulgaria in the family of opera director Svetozar Donev and prima ballerina Svetlana Doneva (Svetlana Hristova). She has an older brother Stephan Donev who is also an opera director and teaches at the Bulgarian National Musical Academy.

Doneva began her dance education in 1987 at the National School of Dance Art in Sofia, Bulgaria and her teacher in ballet was the Bulgarian prima ballerina Kalina Bogoeva. She undertook further studies in 1993 at the Dance Theater Department of Theatre Studio 4xC. In 1999, she graduated from the Bulgarian National Musical Academy, obtaining a Bachelor of Arts degree of Ballet Pedagogy in the Vaganova method. She continued her training at the Laban Centre in London, UK, focusing on choreography, Cunningham technique, release technique, choreological studies, dance teaching, repertory, improvisation, movement observation, anatomy, contact improvisation, yoga and Thai Chi, completing a Professional Diploma in Dance Studies in 2001. In 2011 Doneva was awarded a master's degree in choreography after completing additional studies at the Art Academy in Plovdiv, Bulgaria.

== Career ==
Doneva began teaching contemporary dance technique at the National School of Dance Art in 2001. She was actively involved in establishing the first Contemporary Dance department in the school in 2004 and took the position of artistic director in 2011. Since 2016 she has served as a music and dance expert for the Department of Culture, Sofia Municipality.

Doneva's choreographic work is focused on movement's placement in space and time, and the occurring relationships and forms between the dance objects. Her work is not strictly abstract, with the emphasis placed on pure dance movement. Starting points are the human emotions and relationships, leading to the interaction between rhythm, form and sound. Her work has been acknowledged for unique, distinguished lines and gestures, as well as for its complexity.

Her classes are strongly focused on the student's ability to understand and utilize different dance methods, creating a system which supports the development of their physical and artistic skills. Her emphasis is on pushing the boundaries of the body, understanding the internal connections, working on alignment and strengthening while producing clarity. The dance sequences are bases on the principals of LMA (Laban Movement Analysis), Cunningham and release techniques. Focusing on developing the dancers' performance skills, her method also places great importance on the understanding of the relationships between the choreographer and the dancer and the choreographic creative process as a whole.

Doneva is a regular teacher at the International Summer Ballet Academy in Varna, Bulgaria, and has been engaged in various workshops in Bulgaria and Italy. She has served as a jury member for a number of professional ballet competitions in Bulgaria and Italy.

== Choreographic works ==
National Opera and Ballet Sofia

- 2022 "A Midsummer Night's Dream" by William Shakespeare, music Mendelssohn
- 2015 "Les pecheurs de perles", G. Biset

The National Musical Theater

- 2002 "Jesus Christ Superstar" A. L. Webber
- 2003 "Sugar" B.Wylder and I.A.Dimand
- 2005 "Evita" A. L. Webber
- 2007 "Miss Saigon" Shonberg
- 2009 "Cats" A. L. Webber
- 2023 "LOVE NEVER DIES" A. L. Webber

Arabesque Ballet Company

- 1998 "Sleeping…THERE" A. Vapirov
- 1999 "Black Box" G. Arnaoudov
- 2008 "Aquarelles" N. Paganini, J.
- 2013 "Swan Lake" Tchaikovsky
- 2016 "Whisper" String Quartet No.15, Shostakovich

State Opera Varna, Bulgaria

- 2013 "Musicals Gala" A. L. Webber
- 2014 "Jesus Christ Superstar" A. L. Webber
- 2017 "Cats" A. L. Webber
- 2019 "GOLEMANOV" musical created by Georgy Gostov /music/ and Ivo Siromahov /libretto/
- 2019 "LOVE NEVER DIES" A. L. Webber
- 2020 "La belle Helene" Jacques Offenbach

State Opera Plovdiv, Bulgaria

- 2019 "Aquarelles" N. Paganini, J.

State Opera Rousse, Bulgaria

- 2009 Die Fledermaus" by J. Strauss
- 2015 "Prayer" J. S. Bach

In 2008 her work "Bulgarian Rose" was chosen (amongst works from 15 other European countries) to be presented at the European Dance Platform in Frankfurt.

Additional items include repertoire works for the National School of Dance Art, Sofia, Bulgaria (2001 – 2011) as well as various works for ballet competitions.
