= Lisbeth Balslev =

Danish operatic soprano

Lisbeth Balslev (born 21 February 1945) is a Danish operatic soprano with an international career, especially in Wagnerian operas.

Balslev was born in Aabenraa and originally trained as a nurse. She then studied singing, first at the Academy of Music and Music Communication in Esbjerg, then at the opera academy of the Royal Danish Theater in Copenhagen. In 1976, she made her debut at the Royal Danish Theater as Yaroslavna in Prince Igor.

After two years, Balslev left the Royal Danish Theater and had her international breakthrough as Senta in Harry Kupfer's staging of Wagner's Der fliegende Holländer at the 1978 Bayreuth Festival. From 1979 to 1983 she sang at the Hamburg State Opera, after which she has worked freelance at La Scala, the Vienna State Opera and Bayreuth among others.

In addition to her professional work, Balslev was in 1992 among the founders of an organization which supports orphanages in Romania and provides summer and Christmas vacations for the children.

Balslev has received several awards and honors, including Tagea Brandt Rejselegat (1996) and the Reumert Prize, of which she was the first recipient (1999). In 1993, she was made a Dame of the Order of the Dannebrog.
