= Peter Schaufuss =

Danish choreographer

Peter Schaufuss (born 1949) is a Danish ballet dancer, director and choreographer.

== Biography ==
He is the son of ballet dancers Frank Schaufuss (1921–1997) and Mona Vangsaae (1920–1983).

Schaufuss trained at the Royal Danish Ballet School from age seven, and then joined the Royal Danish Ballet.

He was artistic director of the English National Ballet 1984 to 1990, and Berlin Ballet from 1990 to 1994. From 1994 to 1995, he was artistic director of the Royal Danish Ballet. In 1988 he founded English National Ballet School.

He was knighted in Denmark for his services to the arts in 1988.

In 1997, he founded the Peter Schaufuss Ballet, based in Holstebro, Denmark.

Schaufuss operates Rose Theatre, The Basement Theatre and Saint Stephen's Theatre in the Scottish capital Edinburgh.
