= Hans Brenaa =

Danish dancer, teacher and ballet director

Hans Brenaa (Copenhagen, 9 October 1910 – Copenhagen, 14 April 1988) was a Danish dancer, teacher, and ballet director.

== Biography ==
He studied at the Royal Danish Ballet School from 1918 and joined the company in 1928; promoted to principal in 1945. He created roles in George Balanchine Legend of Joseph (1931) and in numerous ballets by Lander, including Études (1948). He produced Aurora's Wedding for the Royal Danish Ballet in 1950. After retiring from the stage in 1955 he became a producer, staging the Bournonville repertoire in Denmark and elsewhere. He also taught at the Royal Danish Ballet School in Copenhagen from 1942 and was a tireless teacher of the Bournonville style throughout Europe and America. Among the Bournonville productions he staged for the Royal Danish Ballet are The Kermesse in Bruges (1957 and 1978), La Sylphide (1967), Konservatoriet (1968), The King's Volunteers on Amager (1970), Far from Denmark (1973), and La Ventana (1979). Brenaa made the more straightforward and ingenuous ballets dance across the stage with an infectious vitality. During the periods in which Hans Brenaa was absent from the theatre, Kirsten Ralov was the custodian of the Bournonville tradition. In 1979 she committed the Bournonville Schools to paper.

Hans Brenaa said

I feel, I know, it's very important to shew the young people what is Bournonville. I think we do not do as much as we should do, here at the Royal Theatre, we have too much modern ballet. Of course the young people, they like that, but if we do too much, we forget Bournonville, and Bournonville is the principal thing for Denmark !.
