= Henning Kronstam =

Henning Kronstam (June 29, 1934 – May 28, 1995) was a famous Danish ballet dancer, ballet master and company director.

== Life and career ==
Born in Copenhagen, Denmark, he began training with the Royal Danish Ballet at the age of nine. He later joined the company as an apprentice at the age of sixteen and was promoted to solo dancer at the age of twenty one.

Kronstam dominated the Royal Danish Ballet's repertory for more than two decades, dancing over 120 roles, many of which were created, such as the role of Romeo in Sir Frederick Ashton's Romeo and Juliet (1955), the Husband in John Cranko's Secrets (1956), Nilas in Birgit Cullberg's Moon Reindeer (1958), and the Prince in Flemming Flindt's The Nutcracker (1971).

He succeeded Flemming Flindt as ballet master of the Royal Danish Ballet in 1978 and was responsible for the planning and direction of the 1979 Bournonville Festival as well as for restoring Bournonville, and classical ballet generally, to the center of the company's repertory. He also was a noted teacher and coach. He retired as balletmaster in 1985 but continued to stage and rehearse ballets until 1994.

== Death ==
He died suddenly on May 28, 1995, of a pulmonary embolism.
