= Silja Schandorff =

Danish ballet dancer and ballet master

Silja Maria Wendrup Schandorff (born 1969) is a Danish ballerina who performed with the Royal Danish Ballet from 1985 to 2009. She has since served the Royal Theatre as ballet instructor and deputy ballet master.

== Biography ==
Born on 10 February 1969 in Dragør, Silja Schandorff is the daughter of Axel Carl Schandorff, a Cyclist with Olympic bronze medal and goldsmith, and Runa Clara Wendrup Petersen, a ballet dancer in Tivoli's Pantomime Theatre. Thanks to the encouragement of her parents, she entered the Royal Theatre's ballet school in 1975. When only nine, she performed a solo children's dance in Elverhøj. After her début in Ib Andersen's 1-2-3–1-2 in 1975, she quickly moved on to the Neoclassical works of George Balanchine, starring in Tschaikovsky Piano Concerto No. 2, Tzigane, La sonnambula, Tschaikovsky Pas de Deux, Allegro Brillante, Agon and Apollo.

As a result of her dancing in the theatre's Balanchine season, she became a principal in 1992. While she has taken roles in La Sylphide, Abdallah and A Folk Tale, she has not been a typical Bournonville dancer, given her tall, slender figure and her artistic temperament. Instead she has moved from the Royal Ballet's romantic traditions to 20th-century modernism. She combined the two approaches in her interpretation of Harald Lander's Études, setting new standards for the work. Her favourite parts evolved as the title roles in Manon and Giselle.

The choreographer Anna Lærkesen was particularly interested in Schandorff, creating adaptations specially for her. These included Partita, Polacca, Hommage à Bournonville and Hommage à Balanchine. After retiring from the stage on 8 April 2009, she remained with the Royal Theatre until 2016, serving as artistic coordinator and instructor (2009-11) and deputy ballet master (2011-16). She has since directed a new production of Giselle.

== Awards ==
Schandorff's awards include the Reumert prize as dancer of the year in 2002 and 2006, the Danish Theatre Cup in 2009 (for her role in Giselle) and the Bikuben prize of honour in 2009. In 2016, she was honoured as a Knight of the Dannebrog.
