= Erik Bruhn =

Danish ballet dancer (1928–1986)

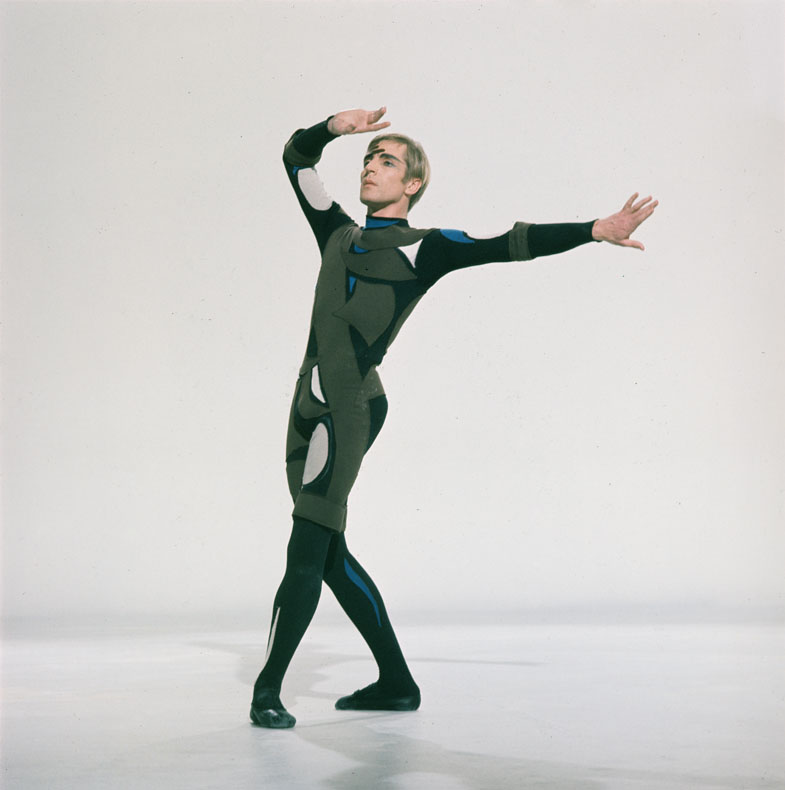
- Bruhn photographed by Pål Nils Nilsson
- Born: Erik Belton Evers Bruhn; 3 October 1928; Copenhagen, Denmark
- Died: 1 April 1986 (aged 57); Toronto, Ontario, Canada
- Education: Royal Danish Ballet School
- Occupations: Ballet dancer, actor
- Years active: 1947–1986
- Partner(s): Sonia Arova; Rudolf Nureyev; Constantin Patsalas

Erik Belton Evers Bruhn (3 October 1928 – 1 April 1986) was a Danish ballet dancer, choreographer, artistic director, actor, and author.

== Early life ==
Erik Bruhn was born in Copenhagen, Denmark, the fourth child and first son of Ellen (née Evers), owner of a hairdressing salon, and third child of Ernst Bruhn. His parents married shortly before his birth. Bruhn began training with the Royal Danish Ballet when he was nine years old, and made his unofficial début on the stage of Copenhagen's Royal Opera House in 1946, dancing the role of Adonis in Harald Lander's ballet Thorvaldsen.

== Career ==
He was taken permanently into the company in 1947 at the age of eighteen. Bruhn took the first of his frequent sabbaticals from the Danish company in 1947, dancing for six months with the short-lived Metropolitan Ballet in England, where he formed his first major partnership, with the Bulgarian ballerina Sonia Arova. He returned to the Royal Danish Ballet in the spring of 1948 and was promoted to soloist in 1949, the highest level a dancer can attain in the Danish ballet. Later in 1949, he again took a leave of absence and joined American Ballet Theatre in New York City, where he would dance regularly for the next nine years, although his home company continued to be the Royal Danish Ballet.

The turning point in Bruhn's international career came on 1 May 1955 with his début in the role of Albrecht in Giselle partnering Dame Alicia Markova, nearly twenty years his senior, in a matinée with Ballet Theatre in New York after only three days of rehearsal. The performance caused a sensation. Dance critic John Martin, writing in The New York Times, called it "a date to write down in the history books, for it was as if the greatest Giselle of today were handing over a sacred trust to what is probably the greatest Albrecht of tomorrow." In an article entitled "The Matinée that Made History" in Dance News in June 1955, P. W. Manchester wrote:

Technically exacting as it is, the role of Albrecht is not beyond the capabilities of any competent premier danseur, and Erik Bruhn is infinitely more than that; he is probably the most completely equipped male dancer of the day, with the flawlessly clean technique that comes only through a combination of enormous talent allied to correct day-by-day training from childhood ... If his dancing was magnificent, and it was, his partnering of and playing to Markova were no less so. The result was one of those electrifying performances when everyone both in the audience and on the stage is aware that something extraordinary is happening.

Bruhn formally resigned from the Danish ballet in 1961, by which time he had become internationally known as a phenomenon, although he continued to dance periodically with the company as a guest artist. In May 1961, he returned to Ballet Theatre for its New York season. In its 5 May issue, Time magazine published a major article on the dancer and his art:

Back home Bruhn, 32, is the idol of the Royal Danish Ballet, where he has brought new life to the classic roles reserved for a premier danseur noble. His technical credentials include a fine dramatic sense and an ability to leap with a high-arching grace, to turn with cat quickness and fluidity on the ground or in midair, to project emotion with vivid movements of arms, legs and body. But Bruhn long ago became aware that "technique is not enough," and he is remarkable for the feeling of tension he can convey by his mere presence. Poised and trim (5 ft. 7 in., 140 lbs.), he somehow rivets an audience with the promise of action before he has danced a step ... As Bruhn soars ever closer to his apogee, he spends restless nights reviewing roles in his mind. He has surprisingly little of the vanity that goads most performers; he does not want audiences to pay, he says, "only to see me jump." Furthermore, he would rather "be bad in a good ballet than be great in a bad ballet." But to be great in a good ballet? To do it, says Erik Bruhn, "it is important, even if you performed a role the night before, to think, 'This is the first time this is going to happen.' "

During the next 10 years, Bruhn formed long relationships as a guest artist not only with Ballet Theatre but with most all of the major ballet companies in Europe and North America, including the New York City Ballet, the Joffrey Ballet, the National Ballet of Canada, the Paris Opera Ballet, and London's Royal Ballet. He was best known for his lead roles in La Sylphide, Giselle, Frederick Ashton's Romeo and Juliet, and Swan Lake. John Cranko made Daphnis and Chlöe on him in 1962 at the Stuttgart Ballet, which Bruhn considered his favorite from amongst the ballets created specifically for him. He was also acclaimed in dramatic roles, such as Jean in Birgit Cullberg's Miss Julie, the Moor in José Limón's The Moor's Pavane, and Don José in Roland Petit's Carmen. In addition to Sonia Arova, Bruhn had significant dance partnerships with a large and unusually varied number of ballerinas: the Americans Cynthia Gregory, Nora Kaye, Allegra Kent, and Maria Tallchief; the Russian Natalia Makarova; the Dane Kirstin Simone; the British Nadia Nerina; and, most famously, with the Italian Carla Fracci.

In his book, Beyond Technique (1968), Bruhn discussed his thoughts on partnering:

It has been noticed that I have been able to work with many different kinds of ballerinas, and on most occasions we succeeded in becoming a team if only for a season or two. And that is because I always wanted to relate to them. I don't remain the same. Each ballerina is different; she has a special flavor or she wouldn't be a ballerina. This would color my style and shape my approach. I remain true to myself, but I let her flavor color me as mine colors her ... A good partnership can somehow crystallize something that you have been doing already. When the right people come together, they bring the right thing out of each other ... With the right person, it becomes a situation of being rather than playing ...The role absorbs you and you become it. And then it seems like you can do nothing wrong because you are so totally absorbed by this being.

== Awards and retirement ==
Bruhn dancing with Maria Tallchief in 1961

Bruhn was made a Knight of the Order of the Dannebrog, one of Denmark's highest honors, in 1963, the same year he was awarded the Nijinsky Prize in Paris. After retiring as a danseur noble in 1972, Bruhn danced character roles, such as Madge the Witch in La Sylphide, Dr. Coppelius, and Petrushka. He was director of the Swedish Opera Ballet from 1967 to 1973 and the National Ballet of Canada from 1983 until his death in 1986. Although twice offered the directorship of the Royal Danish Ballet, he twice declined the post. His productions of full-length classical ballets, such as La Sylphide, Giselle, Coppélia, and his somewhat controversial Swan Lake for the National Ballet of Canada, were well received, as were his stagings of pas de deux from the Bournonville repertoire. A superb teacher and coach, Bruhn was dedicated to imparting purity of form and dance as drama not spectacle. He believed in "complete identification" with the character being portrayed, "but under complete control. Because if you lose yourself completely, you cannot communicate." In 1974, he played a leading role in the stage play Rashomon with Susse Wold in Denmark, for which he won acclaim.

== Personal life ==
Bruhn met Rudolf Nureyev, the celebrated Russian dancer, after Nureyev defected to the West in 1961. Nureyev was a great admirer of Bruhn, having seen filmed performances of the Dane on tour in Russia with the American Ballet Theatre, although stylistically the two dancers were very different. Bruhn is considered the great love of Nureyev's life. Due to their busy careers, the two spent a lot of time apart and Bruhn ended their romantic relationship in 1966. The two remained friends until Bruhn's death.

Bruhn lived with his last partner, Canadian dancer and choreographer Constantin Patsalas, for many years. Bruhn's biographer Meinertz clarifies that their close relationship did not last very long, turning into a partnership. Patsalas died of AIDS in Toronto on May 19, 1989.

== Death ==
Erik Bruhn died on April 1, 1986. The cause of his death was lung cancer. Some publications, in particular a book compiled by the publisher Pierre-Henri Verlhac, mention an unofficial version that the cause of death might have been AIDS. This information is speculative and not confirmed by medical documents, as Verlhac is not a researcher or biographer (he is only a publisher) who had access to personal data. Bruhn's official biographer Alexander Meinertz also refutes these rumors in his work. Erik Bruhn is buried in an unmarked grave at Mariebjerg Cemetery in Gentofte, an affluent northern suburb of Copenhagen, near the house where he grew up.

Dance critic John Rockwell, in his obituary of Bruhn, noted:

Mr. Bruhn was valued more as an epitome of manly elegance and for the sensitivity of his acting than as a virtuoso technician. As a partner he was grave and deferential, yet he never subsided meekly into the background. And as a poetic actor, he lifted male leading roles in the classic ballets to a new prominence... Mikhail Baryshnikov [said] "He was indisputably one of the greatest dancers we have ever seen, and his dignity and style have been a model to us all, which can not be replaced."

Clive Barnes had named Bruhn "the greatest male classical dancer of his time" when Bruhn retired in 1972. In an appreciation of Bruhn's accomplishments published in The New York Times shortly after his death, dance critic Anna Kisselgoff said:

He was, then, the model of perfection as a dancer – precise in every step, beautifully placed, a virtuoso technician, noble in bearing, elegant in every gesture. His line was extraordinary, his leg beats – a legacy of his Danish training – amazing. He was one of the few dancers who could bring the house down simply by executing a series of entrechats as James in La Sylphide. The steps, no matter how brilliantly executed, were always part of a deeper concept, part of a characterization. Erik Bruhn was a complete dancer – a far cry from the highly specialized artist he was often made out to be... His moral example to the rest of ballet came through the concentration and seriousness with which he committed himself to every role.

Bruhn authored Beyond Technique with photos by Fred Fehl (1968, reissued as No. 36 of "Dance Perspectives" in 1973), and with Lillian Moore he co-authored Bournonville and Ballet Technique: Studies and Comments on August Bournonville's Etudes Choregraphiques (1961, reprinted 2005). He was the subject of the book Erik Bruhn: Danseur Noble (1979) by John Gruen, written with his cooperation and based in part on extensive interviews. A 2008 biography in Danish by Alexander Meinertz, Erik Bruhn – Billedet indeni (The Picture Within), has yet to be translated into English.

Bruhn was posthumously recognized in 1987 for "exemplary contributions to Canada and its culture" as the first recipient of the annual Pagurian Award for Excellence in the Arts.

In 2014 Heritage Toronto erected a plaque to him outside 135 George Street South in the St Lawrence Market area of Toronto, where he lived for many years.

== Legacy ==
In a codicil to his will, Bruhn left part of his estate for the establishment of The Erik Bruhn Prize, recognizing dancers from the three companies with which he was most closely associated: the Royal Danish Ballet, American Ballet Theatre, and the National Ballet of Canada, each of which are invited to send one male and one female dancer to the competition, held in Toronto, Ontario, Canada. Bruhn specified that the prize be awarded to two young dancers who "reflect such technical ability, artistic achievement and dedication as I endeavoured to bring to dance." Competitors for the prize are between the ages of 18 and 23 and are selected by their respective artistic directors. For the competition, each dancer performs in a classical pas de deux and variations and a contemporary pas de deux or solo work.

The first Erik Bruhn Prize was awarded in 1988.

== Filmography ==
A few of Bruhn's performances have been preserved, several of which are available on DVD and online:

- Symphonie fantastique, filmed in 1948 with the Royal Danish Ballet, choreography by Léonide Massine. A work film, shot without sound and showing the dancers in practice dress. Available on DVD through the Dance Film Archive of Ohio State University.
- Pas de deux, choreographed by Roland Petit, with the French ballerina Zizi Jeanmaire in the 1952 Goldwyn film Hans Christian Andersen. Available on DVD.
- Four short pieces were filmed in 1955 at Jacob's Pillow: Giselle Act II pas de deux with Alicia Alonso; and the Don Quixote pas de deux, Giselle Act II pas de deux, and The Nutcracker Act II pas de deux, all with Mary Ellen Moylan.
- The Ed Sullivan Show (25 August 1957) with Nora Kaye in the Black Swan pas de deux from Swan Lake.
- The Bell Telephone Hour broadcasts: Don Quixote pas de deux with Maria Tallchief (from 1961); Act II of La Sylphide (1962) and a pas de deux from Romeo and Juliet choreographed by Bruhn (1967), both with Carla Fracci; the Black Swan pas de deux with Sonia Arova (1963), and the Act III pas de deux from Coppélia, also with Arova (1963). Available on the DVD "Rudolf Nureyev & Erik Bruhn – Their Complete Bell Telephone Hour Performances (1961–1967)," which also includes Tallchief and Nureyev dancing a pas de deux from Flower Festival in Genzano choreographed by Bruhn after Bournonville (from 1962).
- "The Art of the Pas de Deux": pas de deux from Don Quixote with Maria Tallchief; includes Tallchief and Nureyev in the Flower Festival in Genzano pas de deux choreographed by Bruhn. Available on DVD. Both performances are from "The Bell Telephone Hour" broadcasts and both also can be seen on the DVD "The Art of Maria Tallchief."
- Full-length Giselle with Carla Fracci and American Ballet Theatre (1969), which has been criticized for its eccentric camera work. Available on DVD.
- Erik Bruhn: I'm the Same, Only More – A Personal Portrait of the Legendary Dancer (2002), a posthumous 42-minute film biography by his friend, the Danish filmmaker Lennart Pasborg, includes performance footage and a recorded monologue by Bruhn used as a voice-over for clips and stills. Won an award at Cannes for use of archival material.

== Performance reviews and critiques ==
- "Danseur Noble". Time. 5 May 1961
- "The High & the Mighty". Time. 10 December 1965
- Review of Giselle video (1969)
- "Lady of the Still Point". Time. 14 July 1975
- Kisselgoff, Anna (26 May 1983). "Dance: Erik Bruhn's 'Sylphide' at Ballet Theater". The New York Times.
- Kisselgoff, Anna (13 April 1986). "Erik Bruhn – "Epitome of the Danseur Noble"". The New York Times.
