= Reumert Award =

Danish theatre award

The Reumert Award (Danish: Årets Reumert) is an annual Danish awards ceremony to recognize excellence in theatre achievements in Denmark. The award was founded by the Bikuben Foundation in 1998, and has been handed annually since then. There are 16 award categories as well as 10 talent awards. A jury of ten specialists in theatre selects the recipients, who receive a statuette and a prize. As of 2016, the recipients also receive an amount of money. The recipients of the Reumert Award of Honour receive DKK 200,000, the recipients of the Talent Prize receive DKK 35,000 and all other categories-recipients receive DKK 40,000. The Reumert prize is named after the Danish actor Poul Reumert (1883–1968).

== Categories ==
- Award of Honour (previously Bikuben Award of Honour)
- Best Performance
- Best Actress
- Best Actor
- Best Supporting Actress
- Best Supporting Actor
- Best Dancer
- Best Director
- Best Scenographer
- Best Dramatist
- Best Children Theatre Performance
- Best Opera
- Best Musical
- Best Dance Performance
- Best Special Performance
- 10 Talent Awards for young performers

== Recipients ==
=== Reumert Award of Honour ===
From 1998–2013 the award was called the Bikuben Award of Honour. Since 2014 it is called the Award of Honour (Årets hæderspris).

- 1998 Bodil Udsen, actor
- 1999 Lisbeth Balslev, opera singer
- 2000 Jørgen Reenberg, actor
- 2001 Nikolaj Cederholm, dramatist, director, actor, and theatre manager
- 2002 Nikolaj Hübbe, royal ballet dancer
- 2003 Ghita Nørby, actor
- 2004 Karen-Lise Mynster, actor
- 2005 Preben Kristensen, actor
- 2006 Thomas Lund, dancer
- 2007 Stig Fogh Andersen, royal opera singer
- 2008 Kirsten Olesen, actor
- 2009 Silja Schandorff, dancer
- 2010 Jytte Abildstrøm, actor and theatre manager
- 2011 Lars Mikkelsen, actor
- 2012 Tim Rushton, choreograph and the leader of Dansk Danseteater
- 2013 Klaus Hoffmeyer, director
- 2014 Henning Jensen, actor
- 2015 Kirsten Dehlholm, theatre leader and director
- 2016 Lisbet Dahl, actor and director

=== Reumert Special Award ===
The name of this award was Reumert Special Award (Årets Reumert Særpris) in 2000 and 2002, and again since 2014. In 2012–13 it was called the Reumert Jury Award.

- 2000 Preben Harris, actor and director
- 2002 Jacob Schokking, director
- 2012 "BLAM!" with Neander Teater
- 2013 "Manifest 2083", CaféTeatret
- 2014 "Boys Don't Cry", Mungo Park and Eventministeriet, Det Kongelige Teater
- 2015 "Ungdom", Republique
- 2016 "Hår på den", Teater Grob and Frit Fald

=== Reumert for Best Performance ===
- 1999 "Personkreds 3", Betty Nansen Teatret/Edison
- 2000 "Sælsomt Mellemspil", Det Kgl. Teater
- 2001 "Hamlet", Aalborg Teater
- 2002 "Når vi døde vågner", Betty Nansen Teatret
- 2003 "Kabale og Kærlighed", Det Kgl. Teater
- 2004 "Flugt", Det Kgl. Teater
- 2005 "Demokrati", Betty Nansen Teatret
- 2006 "Havfruen", Kaleidoskop og Cirkus Cirkör
- 2007 "Nick Cave Teaterkoncerten", Aarhus Teater
- 2008 "Et Drømmespil", Betty Nansen Teatret
- 2009 "Breaking the Waves", Odense Teater
- 2010 "Richard III" på Det Kgl. Teater
- 2011 "Den unge Werthers lidelser", Det Kgl. Teater
- 2012 "Mågen", Det Kongelige Teater
- 2013 "Skakten", Aarhus Teater og CaféTeatret
- 2014 "Metamorfoser", Det Kongelige Teater
- 2015 "Beton", Aalborg Teater
- 2016 "Lad den Rette komme ind", Odense Teater

=== Reumert for Best Actress ===
- 1999 Tammi Øst for "Aske til Aske – Støv til Støv", Husets Teater
- 2000 Kirsten Olesen for "Sælsomt Mellemspil", Det Kongelige Teater
- 2001 Jannie Faurschou for "Så enkel er kærligheden", Rialto Teatret
- 2002 Trine Dyrholm for "4:48 Psykose", Betty Nansen Teatret/ Edison
- 2003 Karen-Lise Mynster for "Fra regnormenes liv", Det Danske Teater
- 2004 Ulla Henningsen for "Dødsdansen", Betty Nansen Teatret/Edison
- 2005 Meike Bahnsen for "Anna Karenina", Aalborg Teater
- 2006 Maria Rossing for "Den Kaukasiske Kridtcirkel", Det Kongelige Teater
- 2007 Karen-Lise Mynster for "Pietà", Husets Teater, and "Håndbog i overlevelse", Teater Grob
- 2008 Sofie Gråbøl for "Et drømmespil", Betty Nansen Teatret
- 2009 Tammi Øst for "Ansigtet mod væggen", Holland House and Café Teatret and "Stuk", Det Kongelige Teater
- 2010 Signe Egholm Olsen for "Bygmester Solness", Det Kongelige Teater
- 2011 Ina-Miriam Rosenbaum for "Marguerite Viby – en pige med pep", Off/Off Production, and "Hitler on the Roof", Leman & Rosenbaum
- 2012 Kirsten Olesen for "Gengangere", Det Kongelige Teater
- 2013 Tammi Øst for "Kirsebærhaven", Aalborg Teater
- 2014 Marianne Høgsbro for "Indenfor murene", Aalborg Teater
- 2015 Karen-Lise Mynster for "Det der er", Husets Teater
- 2016 Benedikte Hansen for "Tørst", performed on the Abelone Koppel

=== Reumert for Best Actor ===
- 1999 Henning Jensen "Personkreds 3", Edison, Betty Nansen Teatret
- 2000 Søren Pilmark, "København", Betty Nansen Teatret
- 2001 Flemming Enevold, "The Phantom of the Opera”
- 2002 Nikolaj Lie Kaas "Peer Gynt”
- 2003 Jesper Langberg, "Festen", Mammutteatret
- 2004 Gyrd Løfqvist for "Gæsten", Teatret ved Sorte Hest
- 2005 Henning Jensen, "Pinocchios Aske", Det Kongelige Teater
- 2006 Jørgen Reenberg, "Indenfor murene", Det Kongelige Teater
- 2007 Nicolas Bro for "Faust", Det Kongelige Teater
- 2008 Nicolas Bro, "Hamlet", Det Kongelige Teater
- 2009 Jens Albinus, "Stuk", Det Kongelige Teater
- 2010 Søren Sætter-Lassen for "Richard III", Det Kongelige Teater
- 2011 Mads M. Nielsen for "Udslet Hornsleth", Teater V
- 2012 Jens Albinus for "Jeppe på Bjerget", Aarhus Teater
- 2013 Ole Lemmeke for "Bang og Betty", Folketeatret
- 2014 Søren Sætter-Lassen, for "Faderen", Det Kongelige Teater
- 2015 Olaf Johannessen for "Samtale før døden", Betty Nansen Teatret, "Mefisto", Betty Nansen Teatret og "Heksejagt", Det Kongelige Teater
- 2016 Olaf Johannessen for "Puntila", Det Kongelige Teater

=== Reumert Talent Award ===
==== 2014 ====
- Benita Bünger, dancer, for her performance in Come Fly Away, Den Kongelige Ballet.

==== 2016 ====
- Franciska Zahle, scenographer, for her scenography for Melodien der blev væk på Nørrebro Teater.
- Kristoffer Helmuth, actor, for his performance in Lad den rette komme ind and Brødrene Løvehjerte on Odense Teater.
- Liv Helm, instruktør, for her iscenesættelse af Salamimetoden på Aarhus Teater, and Og nu: verden! på Husets Teater.
- Marie Knudsen Fogh, actor, for her performance in Richard III and Daemon on Aalborg Teater.
- Morten Grove Frandsen, singer, for his performance in Leaves, Sort/Hvid and Copenhagen Opera Festival.
- Nanna Rossen, singer, for his performance in Hairspray, Tivoli and Thomas Langkjær Entertainment.
- Simon Sears, actor, for his performance in Sidst på dagen er vi alle mennesker on Mammutteatret.
- Tobias Praetorius, dancer, for his performance in Short Time Together, Den Kongelige Ballet.
