= Thomas Lund (dancer) =

Danish ballet dancer (born 1974)

- Born: 13 September 1974 (age 51); Copenhagen, Denmark
- Occupation: Head of Royal Danish Ballet school
- Years active: 1986–
- Website: www.dancer.dk

Thomas Lund (born 13 September 1974) is a Danish head of Royal Danish Ballet school and former dancer. He was awarded "World's Best Dancer" in 2005 at the school's Bournonville festival.

Lund was appointed as Commander of the Order of Dannebrog in 2022.
