= Niels Bjørn Larsen =

Danish ballet dancer and choreographer (1913–2003)

Niels Bjørn Larsen (15 October 1913 in Copenhagen – 13 March 2003) was a Danish ballet dancer, choreographer and balletmaster.

== Career ==
He was admitted to the Royal Danish Ballet school in 1920 and debuted in a production of Gudindernes Strid in 1933. In 1942, Larsen was promoted to soloist and remained with the Royal Danish Ballet until 1986.

In the beginning of the 1930s, Larsen toured Europe and the US with the Swiss mime Trudi Schoop. This, together with a study trip to France, England and the US, laid the ground for his career as a mime and character dancer.

Larsen was balletmaster at the Royal Danish Theatre during two periods, 1951–56 and 1961–65. From 1956 to 1980, he was artistic leader of the Pantomime Theatre at Tivoli. As choreographer, he made ballets on the Royal Danish Theatre, the Pantomime Theatre and at other theatres, as well as in film. He documented performances from the Royal Danish Ballet from 1950.

Larsen was a Knight of the 1st Class in the Order of the Dannebrog.

== Personal Life and Death ==
He married pianist Elvi Henriksen on 13 August 1946, with whom he had a daughter, Dinna Bjørn; he is buried in Bispebjerg Kirkegård.
