= Valborg Borchsenius =

Danish ballet dancer

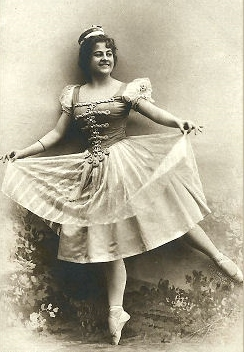
Valborg Borchsenius as Swanhilda (c. 1910)

Valborg Bodil Emilie Borchsenius née Jørgensen, also Valborg Guldbrandsen, (1872–1949) was a Danish ballet dancer and instructor who performed in Bournonville's productions at the Royal Danish Theatre from 1888. As a soloist she is also remembered as Swanhilda in Coppélia, a role she performed 128 times to wide acclaim. She became the company's star ballerina until her retirement in 1918.

== Biography ==
Born on 19 November 1872, Valborg Bodil Emilie Jørgensen was the daughter of Jørgen Adolf Jørgensen (1822–1900), an instrument maker, and Christiane Pouline Engelund (1835–1890). She married twice, first in 1896 to the actor Johannes Norden Guldbrandsen (1871–1922), then in 1908 to the actor and later theatre director Kaare Guldbrand Borchsenius (1874–1960).

Valborg Jørgensen attended the ballet school of the Royal Danish Theatre from 1879. As a child, she appeared in the first performances of Ibsen's A Doll's House at the Royal Theatre. After her ballet début in 1888 as the eskimo girl in Bournonville's Far from Denmark, in 1891 she danced the title role in his La Sylphide, marking her development as a soloist. She went on to take the leading roles in Bournonville's repertoire, often partnering Hans Beck. She played Astrid in Valdemar, Hilda in Et Folkesagn, Sigyn in Thrymskviden, Ragnhild and Kirsti in Brudefærden i Hardanger, Svava in Valkyrien and Celeste in Toreadoren.

In June 1918, she retired as a dancer, performing two of her most successful roles: Swinilda in Coppélia and Teresina in Napoli. She continued as a teacher at the theatre's ballet school, ensuring that the children were brought up in the true Bournonville style in the 1930s, 1940s and 1950s. One of her lasting achievements was that she described in writing the choreographic details of Bournonville's ballets, ensuring that later generations would be able to draw on an authentic record.

Valborg Borchsenius died in Copenhagen on 5 January 1949 and is buried in Garnison's Cemetery.
