= Nikolaj Hübbe =

Nikolaj Hübbe (born 30 October 1967) is a former artistic director of the Royal Danish Ballet until 31 October 2024 when the American Amy Watson was appointed as his replacement.

== Career ==
Since becoming artistic director of the Royal Danish Ballet, Hübbe has successfully staged new productions of Bournonville's Napoli (2009) and A Folk Tale (2011) as well as Marius Petipa's La Bayadère (2012).

== Farewell performance ==
Hübbe's farewell at City Ballet was held at the New York State Theater, Lincoln Center, on 10 February 2008.

== See also ==
- Taylor Stanley
- Stanislav Olshanskyi

== Reviews ==
- NY Times by Alastair Macaulay, 12 February 2008
- NY Sun by Joel Lobenthal, 12 February 2008

== Interview ==
- Reuters, 5 October 2007, New Danish ballet chief at home with heritage
