= Kirsten Ralov =

Danish ballerina

Kirsten Ralov (26 March 1922 – 30 May 1999) was a Danish ballerina.

She was born to Kai and Kaja Gnatt, née Olsen, a family of dancers living in Baden, Austria. Kirsten's mother encouraged her, and her brother Poul, to train as dancers. She entered the school of the Royal Danish Ballet at the age of 22, and was associated with that troupe throughout her career. Her theatrical debut was as a child in Konservatoriet in 1933. Her first solo performance as an adult was in 1941 in La Ventana. Throughout her artistic career, she primarily performed on the stage of the Royal Theater in Copenhagen, where she was most notable for her ballet performances of the works of August Bournonville. Her farewell performance was in 1962, where she danced the Ballerina Doll in Petrouchka by Michel Fokine. Thereafter, she became the ballet mistress for the Royal Danish Ballet. From 1978 to 1988 she was the associate director under Henning Kronstam.

Her four part work, The Bournonville School (1979), includes daily classes teaching the Bournonville technique, along with the associated sheet music. She was first married to Børge Ralov, then later to Fredbjorn Bjornsson; both Danish dancers. She had two sons.

== See also ==
- List of ballets by August Bournonville
