= A Folk Tale =

Ballet in three acts by August Bournonville

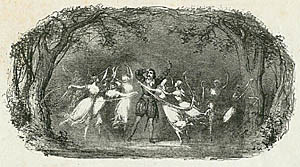
Vignette from the piano music

A Folk Tale (Danish: Et Folkesagn) is a ballet in three acts, created in 1854 for the Royal Danish Ballet by the Danish ballet master and choreographer August Bournonville to the music of Johan Peter Emilius Hartmann and Niels W. Gade. The first performance took place on 20 March 1854. Set in the Middle Ages, the ballet tells the story of a changeling living among the trolls and elves. Bournonville declared the ballet "The most complete and best of all my choreographic works."

== Background ==
At the beginning of the 1850s, Svend Grundtvig initiated a systematic recording of Danish folklore - the stories were told and written down in every little village in Denmark – but Bournonville did not credit Grundtvig as his source of inspiration, even though today Grundtvig is probably considered to be the person who made the most effort to preserve the wealth of Danish national folk tradition. Bournonville found his inspiration in a collection of national Danish songs (Nationalmelodier) published by the philologist R. Nyerup and the composer A.P. Berggren in J.M. Thiele's collection of Danish folk legends (Danske Folkesagn) published in four volumes between 1818 and 1823. Bournonville also found inspiration in the tales collected by the Grimm brothers in Germany.

The Romantic artists had a passion for the national and the past. The early part of the 19th century was a difficult time both politically and economically for Denmark, and this naturally generated a glorification of times past. The emergent bourgeoisie needed to consolidate its cultural status and found motifs for this in national folklore. The economic growth in a rapidly expanding Copenhagen had to some extent overshadowed spiritual development. Artists interpreted their contemporary society in a purely materialistic light. Oehlenschläger's poem about The Golden Horns (Guldhornene) is probably the most famous example of this issue but Hans Christian Andersen's fairytale The Bell (Klokken) depicted the materialistic fixation of the period with humour, irony and gravity.

In the chapter about A Folk Tale in My Theatre Life (Mit Teaterliv), Bournonville makes his attitude to the present and the past clear: he indicates that our practical and rather unpoetic times (which seem about to precipitate a period of literary and artistic crop failure on the very lands that were once the richest soil of the imagination) art has fallen by the wayside. The poetic past has been replaced by a 'hypercritical' present, as Bournonville himself writes, and it is the duty of the artist to restore the spiritual, the poetry.

The artist saw himself as endowed by God with the ability to sense the true values and perspective in life. This insight was to be communicated to the ordinary citizen through art.

The function of art as a formative model was something about which Bournonville felt very strongly. In his choreographic credo he writes: It is the mission of art in general, and the theatre in particular, to intensify thought, to elevate the mind, and to refresh the senses. Music and dance elevate the mind and refresh the senses, but it is when the story comes into play that thought is intensified.

A Folk Tale takes as its starting point the archetypal dilemma of the folk ballad, the transition from one home to another in the context of a wedding, where both men and women run the risk of getting into difficulties. The men might be lured under a spell by elves and the women might be carried off by disguised nixes and it always happens in an outdoor, natural environment, which is both compelling and mysterious. Both the elves and the nixes exert a demonic and erotic power over the victims and in most cases have a fateful impact on them - many end in the grave.

Bournonville must have had the folk songs Elveskud (The Elf-shot) and Elvehøj (The Elves' Hill) in mind when he has Junker Ove linger at the hill after lunch with Miss Birthe, his fiancée, only to dream of another - a beautiful and gentle Hilda, the counter-image of Birthe. It is always at this point - the moment of doubt before a wedding - that the elves appear. For the young man in the folksong Elveskud, the encounter proves fatal. He refuses to dance with the elf girl and her punishment is so harsh that he dies. He is laid in his grave on his wedding day, followed by his fiancée and his mother. In Elvehøj, which is of a later date than Elveskud, it is God who has human fate in his hands. He lets the cock crow at dawn and the young man, who had slept by the hill, wakes from his spell (which turns out to have been a dream) and he counts himself lucky. The manager of the Royal Theatre, J.L. Heiberg - who Bournonville fell out with on numerous occasions during this period because he thought that Heiberg was trying to drive the ballet off the stage - had experienced great success with his Elvehøj, which in Biedermeier style, lets the elves' dance dissolve into dream and delusion.

Despite this, Bournonville decided to compose his own version of the story about the young man who is danced into a spell by a group of elf maidens. In an engraving from 1856, the painter Edvard Lehmann, who was also a close friend of the Bournonville family, portrayed the spellbound Junker Ove encircled by the hovering, luminous elves. Ove is briefly imprisoned in this state, but fortunately the beautiful Hilda comes to his rescue with water from a healing spring. Even though she has grown up among trolls inside the hill, we know that she is really a changeling, swapped as a baby with the temperamental Birthe, who is the real troll child. The changeling aspect means that the story never becomes as seriously dangerous for Ove as the Sylphide's enchantment is for James in Bournonville's Taglioni-inspired ballet from 1836. But then, again, the Danish Romantics did not cultivate fragmentation in the same way as the French. The Danes sought for the harmony and the idyll.

Even though both Junker Ove and Hilda suspect that they are in the wrong place in their lives as the story begins, they are not able to act on their own initiative. The dream gives Hilda an inkling of this other life, and the dream by the hill gives Junker Ove an idea about the ideal woman, but it is the crucifix and the golden goblet, two Christian symbols, which reveal the truth of the matter. Christianity is to be thanked for the restoration of harmony. Junker Ove gets his Hilda, and the promise of gold persuades Sir Mogens to be united with Birthe who, in a modern interpretation, represents the young woman with the unruly disposition unable to conform to society's norms. She is handed over - troll for gold - to Sir Mogens in order to continue her life somewhere else completely.

Following Bournonville's death, Hans Beck took over the stewardship of the ballets. In 1894, A Folk Tale was once again on stage, in Hans Beck's production. It has since been passed down from generation to generation, re-read and re-staged by successive Bournonville interpreters: Gustav Uhlendorff in 1922, Kaj Smith in 1931, Harald Lander and Valborg Borschsenius in 1941, Niels-Bjørn Larsen and Gerda Karstens in 1952, Hans Brenaa and Kirsten Ralov in 1969, Kirsten Ralov in 1977 and 1979. The most recent version of this lively folklorist ballet was produced in 1991, staged by Frank Andersen and Anne Marie Vessel Schlüter, with settings and costumes designed by Queen Margrethe II.

== Plot summary ==
Act I

The wealthy but fickle Birthe enjoys a forest outing with friends. She flirts with Sir Mogens though her bethrothed, the handsome Junker Ove is present. When the party leaves for home, Ove remains behind. An elf-hill nearby opens. Hilda, an elf-girl, tries to lure Ove into the hill with a magic drink in a gold cup but he refuses it and she returns to the elf-hill. The sorceress Muri conjures up a bevy of elf-girls who dance with Ove and leave him deranged.

Act II

In the elf-hill, troll brothers Diderik and Viderik both woo Hilda. Diderik, the elder, has the right of priority. Viderik protests, but his mother scolds him. In a dream, Hilda sees trolls take a human child from a cradle and steal a gold cup. Hilda recognizes the dream cup as the one she offered Ove. She suspects she is the human child in the dream and becomes uneasy. The wedding of Hilda and Diderik is celebrated with a feast. The trolls become drunk and Hilda flees.

Act III

In scene 1, Hilda dances near a holy spring as harvesters pass by and Mogens notices her. Junker Ove walks by, completely elf-struck after his nocturnal dances with the elf-girls. Hilda leads him to the healing spring where he regains his senses. When Ove tries to defend Hilda against Mogens, he is overpowered by the harvesters. Hilda flees. In scene 2, Birthe bullies her servants. She rages and admits that Hilda is the true heir to the estate while she is an elf. In the last scene of the ballet, Mogens marries Birthe after Muri offers him gold. Hilda is united with Junker Ove. Hilda and Ove celebrate their wedding with a waltz.

== Characters ==
- Birthe, a rich, young noblewoman
- Junker Ove, Birthe's bethrothed
- Sir Mogens, a flirtatious nobleman
- Hilda, a changeling
- Muri, a sorceress
- Diderik, an elf-boy
- Viderik, an elf-boy
- Nobles, peasants, gypsies, trolls, elves

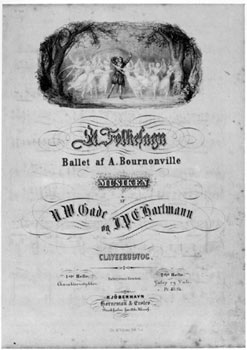
Sheet music Et Folkesagn

== Music ==
Niels W. Gade provided the music for the beech forest scenes of Acts I and III, while J.P.E. Hartmann composed the music with an Old Norse tone for the burlesque trolls in Act II.

Act I presents the principal musical characteristics: the brisk music of the hunt, the ballad-like folksong melodies, the nobles' dignified minuet, the peasants' reel and the elf maidens' dance. Gade's orchestration shows patent inspiration from Felix Mendelssohn (1809–1957) and his A Midsummer Night's Dream.

Hartmann's music for Act II is typified by a clear-cut character idiom in which rhythmic tension and dark resonance dominate. For Hilda's solo he composed an elegant bolero and a festive galop for the drunken trolls.

In Act III, the final scene features a gypsy polonaise, followed by the Bridal Waltz, a famous composition Gade considered to be a trifle, but which nowadays accompanies practically every Danish wedding.
