= Royal Danish Ballet =

Classical ballet company

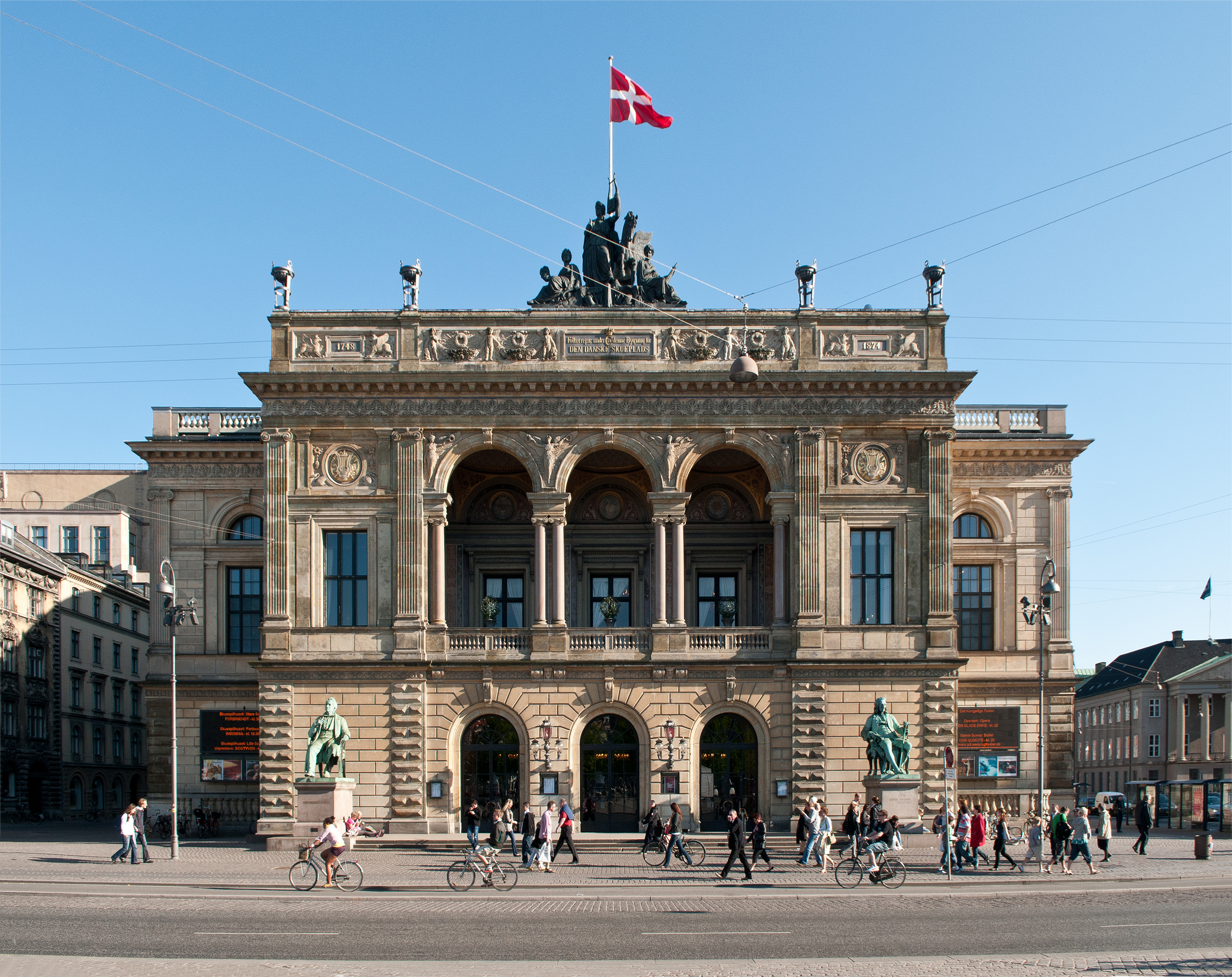
- The Royal Danish Theatre in Copenhagen, principal venue of the Royal Danish Ballet

General information
- Name: Royal Danish Ballet
- Local name: Den Kongelige Ballet
- Year founded: 1748
- Founder: King Frederick V
- Principal venue: Royal Danish Theatre Copenhagen Opera House
- Website: kglteater.dk/om-os/kunstarter/den-kongelige-ballet

Artistic staff
- Artistic director: Amy Watson

Other
- Orchestra: Royal Danish Orchestra
- Official school: Royal Danish Ballet school

The Royal Danish Ballet (Danish: Den Kongelige Ballet) is an internationally renowned classical ballet company, based at the Royal Danish Theatre in Kongens Nytorv, Copenhagen, Denmark. It is one of the oldest ballet companies in the world and originates from 1748, when the Royal Danish Theatre was founded. It was finally organized in 1771 in response to the great popularity of French and Italian styles of dance. The company was founded with the opening of the Royal Danish Theatre, which has served as its home since that time. The Royal Danish Ballet school was founded in 1771 under the leadership of French ballet teacher Pierre Laurent (1730–1807), then Vincenzo Galeotti developed it and August Bournonville founded his methodology for the school.

== History ==
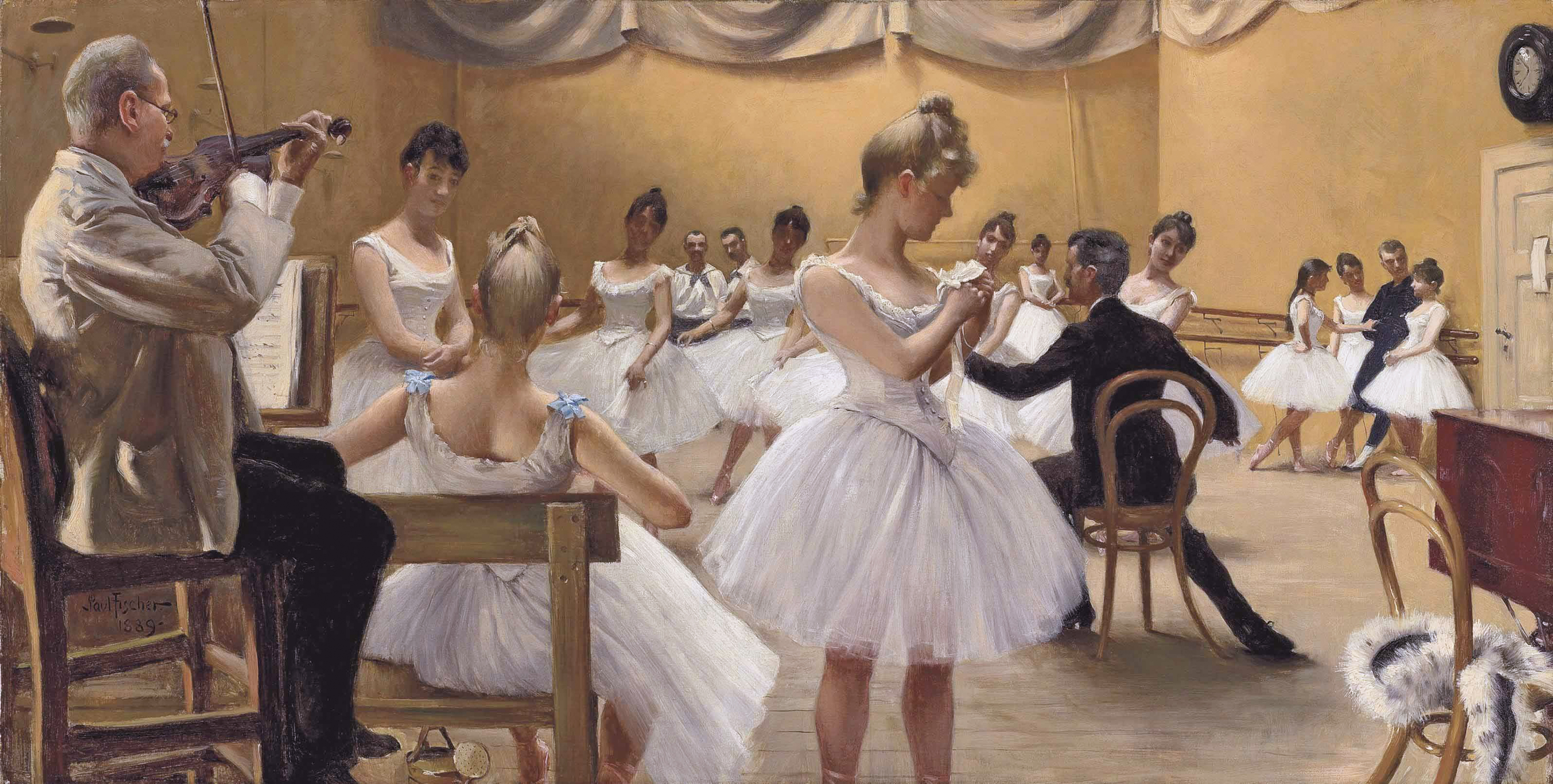
The Royal Theatre Ballet School, Copenhagen (1889) by Paul Gustave Fischer. The painting shows violinist Busch, the ballerina Charlotte Weihe (standing centre foreground) and the ballet master Emil Hansen, seated on the right.

From the outset, the Royal Danish Ballet employed some of the leading French and Italian dancers and choreographers. Within a few years of its founding, in 1771, the Royal Theater Ballet School or Royal Danish Ballet school was established to provide native dancers, of which one of the first was Anine Frølich. One of its early masters, Vincenzo Galeotti, is considered the veritable founder of the company. He was master of the company from 1775 to 1816, and introduced ballet d'action and prepared for the advent of romantic ballet. Galeotti is credited with choreographing Amors og Balletmesterens Luner (The Whims of Cupid and the Ballet Master), which is still part of the company's repertoire and is the world's oldest ballet still performed with its original choreography.

Another major master of the troupe was the Danish dancer August Bournonville. During the half-century that Bournonville led the company (1828–1879), he choreographed some fifty ballets, of which about a dozen are still part of the company's repertoire. The works are highly influenced by the French school of dance, since Bournonville studied in that country, and include key roles for male dancers, undoubtedly written with himself in mind. After his death, one of his successors, Hans Beck, used the basic steps he learned in Bournonville's classes to create the Bournonville school to teach contemporary dancers the tradition of the old master.

The third great period of the Danish Royal Ballet came in 1932, when Harald Lander took over the helm of the corps. Trained in the United States and the Soviet Union, he both adapted traditional ballets and choreographed original works for the company. He encouraged local choreographers, who went on to create prominent works that won international acclaim. Among them was Børge Ralov, who choreographed the first modern Danish Ballet, The Widow in the Mirror, in 1934. He also trained many prominent international dancers, including Erik Bruhn.

A prominent company director was Henning Kronstam (1978–1982), who directed the 1979 Bournonville Festival.

In the latter half of the 20th century, the Royal Danish Ballet underwent another transformation, with many internationally prominent choreographers, including George Balanchine, commissioned to work with it. Though modern works assumed increasingly important stature in the repertoire, the ballet continued to remain loyal to its classical roots as well, earning it the reputation as one of the finest corps of dancers in the world, incorporating foreign as well as native-born talent.

In 2007 the appointment of New York City Ballet principal dancer Nikolaj Hübbe as artistic director was announced. In October 2024 Hübbe stepped down after having received a formal reprimand from the board of the Royal Danish Theatre, following a legal investigation which concluded that he had failed in his responsibilities as the leader of the theatre's ballet school by not adequately ensuring a proper educational environment. Former principal dancer Amy Watson was announced as the new artistic director.

== Artistic directors ==
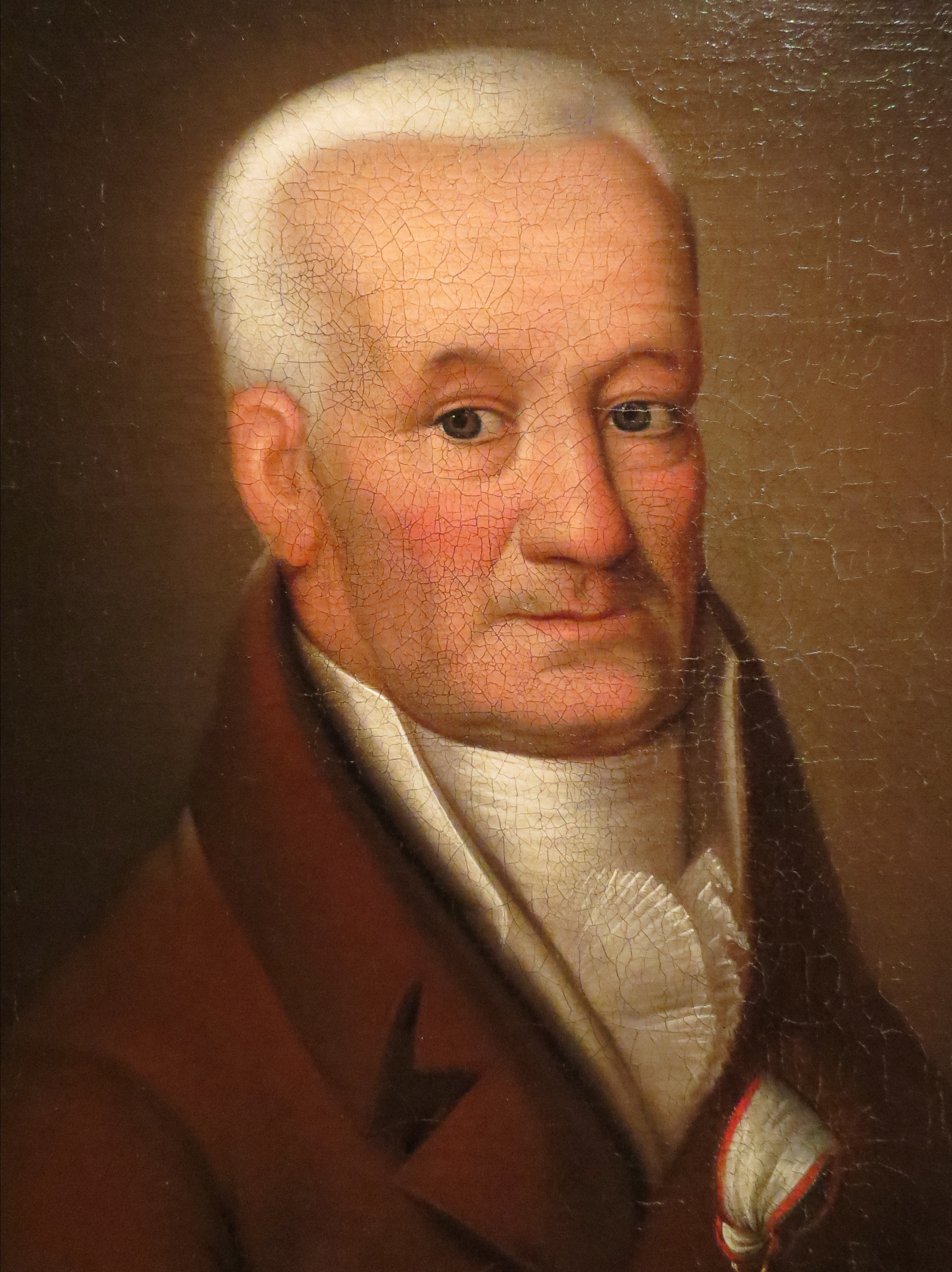
Vincenzo Galeotti

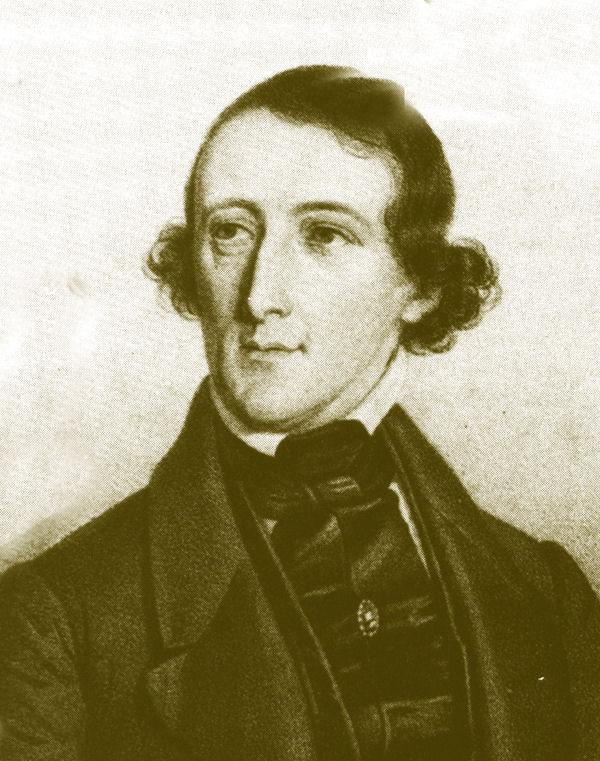
August Bournonville in 1841.

- 1748–1753 Des Larches
- 1755–1756 Neudin
- 1756–1763 Antonio Como
- 1763–1767 Antonio Sacco
- 1767–1768 Jean Baptiste Martin
- 1768–1770 Innocente Gambuzzi
- 1770–1771 Martini
- 1771–1772 Vincenzo Piatolli
- 1772–1773 Domenico Andriani
- 1773–1775 Vincenzo Piatolli
- 1775–1816 Vincenzo Galeotti
- 1816–1823 Antoine Bournonville
- 1823–1830 Pierre Larcher
- 1830–1877 August Bournonville
- 1877–1890 Ludvig Gade
- 1890–1894 Emil Hansen
- 1894–1915 Hans Beck
- 1915–1928 Gustav Uhlendorff
- 1928–1930 Kaj Smith
- 1930–1932 Victor Schiøler
- 1932–1951 Harald Lander
- 1951–1956 Niels Bjørn Larsen
- 1956–1958 Frank Schaufuss
- 1958–1960 Henning Rohde
- 1961–1966 Niels Bjørn Larsen
- 1966–1978 Flemming Flindt
- 1978–1985 Henning Kronstam
- 1985–1994 Frank Andersen
- 1994–1995 Peter Schaufuss
- 1995–1997 Johnny Eliasen
- 1997–1999 Maina Gielgud
- 1999–2002 Aage Thordal-Christensen
- 2002–2008 Frank Andersen
- 2008–2024 Nikolaj Hübbe
- 2024– Amy Watson

== The company ==
The Royal Danish Ballet employs approximately 90 dancers separated into three ranks: Corps de Ballet, Soloists, and Principal dancers.

=== Principal dancers ===
Name	Nationality	Training	Other companies (inc. guest performances)
Caroline Baldwin	Denmark United States	Faubourg School of Ballet, Chicago School of American Ballet San Francisco Ballet School Houston Ballet's Ben Stevenson Academy Royal Ballet School	
Alexander Bozinoff	Canada	Canada's National Ballet School John Cranko School	Staatstheater Nürnberg
Stephanie Chen Gundorph	Denmark	Odense Ballet School Royal Danish Ballet School	
Jonathan Chmelensky	France	Paris Conservatoire Cuban National Ballet School	Norwegian National Ballet
Holly Dorger	United States	School of American Ballet Vienna State Opera Ballet School	Grand Rapids Ballet
Astrid Elbo	Denmark	Royal Danish Ballet School	
Jón Axel Fransson	Iceland	Royal Danish Ballet School	
Wilma Giglio	Argentina	Teatro del Libertador General San Martin Canada's National Ballet School	Teatro Colón
Andreas Kaas	Denmark	Royal Danish Ballet School	National Ballet of Canada
Emma Riis-Kofoed	Denmark	Royal Danish Ballet School	
Silvia Selvini	Italy	La Scala Theatre Ballet School	Covent Garden Dance Company
Ryan Tomash	Canada	Canada's National Ballet School	Tivoli Ballet Hamburg Ballet New York City Ballet

=== Soloists ===
- Guilherme De Menezes
- Philip Duclos
- Ji Min Hong
- Lena-Maria Gruber
- Femke Mølbach Slot
- Meirambek Nazargozhayev
- Emilie Palsgaard-Jensen
- Sebastian Pico Haynes
- Tobias Praetorius
- Mathieu Rouaux
- Liam Redhead
- Eukene Sagues
- Tara Schaufuss

=== Corps de ballet ===
- Agnes Rosendahl
- Alexander Larsson
- Alyssa Douglass
- Balthazar Sénat
- Beatriz Domingues
- Bertil Ulnitz
- Birgitta Lawrence
- Blanche Charlot
- Carling Talcott-Steenstra
- Caroline Iversen
- Celine Olsen
- Clara Adrian
- Daniela De Pompeis
- Ditte Stoltenborg Baltzer
- Elvira Thomsen
- Emerson Moose
- Emilie Palsgaard-Jensen
- Emilie Steensgard
- Emma Larsen
- Emma McKenzie
- Filippe Moraes
- Fiona Lee
- Giorgi Kapitanski
- Grace Curry
- Hannaë Miquel
- Isabella Rose Carroll
- Isabella Walsh
- Joana Senra
- Joscelyn Reneé Dolson
- Joseph Aumeer
- Josephine Henriksen
- Katherine Stevens
- Lania Atkins
- Lorien Ramo Ruiz
- Louis Honoré
- Ludwig af Rosenborg
- Lydia Bevan
- MacLean Hopper
- Mads-Cornelius Ravn
- Marcus Steenberg
- Mattia Santini
- Nathan Compiano
- Nicolaas Janssen
- Oliver Gunderskov
- Oliver Marcus Starpov
- Oscar Ainscough
- Penelope Phelan
- Petra Lamia Love
- Philippa Gudsøe
- Phillip Katsnelson
- Samuel Zaldivar
- Schonan Greve
- Sebastian Suhr
- Sophie Andersen
- Stephanie Sahlgren
- Tobias Jørgensen
- Tobias Praetorius
- Tomoka Kawazoe
- Victoria Bell
- Vitor de Menezes
- Wilma Li

=== Character dancers ===
- Mette la Cour Bødtcher

== Notable former dancers ==
- Frank Andersen (1971–1985)
- Ib Andersen (1972–1980)
- Dinna Bjørn (1964–1987)
- Valborg Borchsenius (1890s–1900s)
- Antoine Bournonville (1792–1796)
- Sorella Englund (1966–1988)
- Vivi Flindt (1965–1980)
- Vincenzo Galeotti (1775–1816)
- Adeline Genée (1895–1897)
- Lucile Grahn (1836–1840)
- Susanne Grinder (1998–2018)
- Mette Hønningen (1966–1988)
- Nikolaj Hübbe (1984–1992)
- Lis Jeppesen (1974–1998)
- Johan Kobborg (1989–1999)
- Henning Kronstam (1956–1979)
- Ask la Cour (1998–2002)
- Margot Lander (1933–1950)
- Toni Lander (1948–1950)
- Niels Bjørn Larsen (1933–1986)
- Alban Lendorf (2008–2015)
- Kizzy Matiakis (2003–2022)
- Augusta Nielsen (mid-19th century)
- Ulla Poulsen (1913–1928)
- Ida Praetorius (2010–2022)
- Ellen Price (1903–1913)
- Juliette Price (late 19th century)
- Kirsten Ralov (1946–1978)
- Heidi Ryom (1974–1997)
- Margrethe Schall (early 19th century)
- Silja Schandorff (1985–2009)
- Margrethe Schanne (1942–1966)
- Peter Schaufuss (1966–1979)
- Kirsten Simone (1952–1985)
- Mona Vangsaae (1938–1958)
- Anne Marie Vessel Schlüter (1965-1988)

== See also ==
- List of productions of Swan Lake derived from its 1895 revival
