= Royal Danish Ballet school =

Coordinates: 55.6796°N 12.5860°E

The Royal Danish Ballet School is a ballet school that trains dancers for the Royal Danish Ballet. It was founded in the 1770s.

== Beginnings ==
In 1771, the first formalised ballet school at the Royal Danish Theater was founded by the French dancer and royal court dancing-master Pierre Laurent. The school was run on a rather humble scale with Laurent teaching six to eight pupils for two hours every day in the unheated vestibule of the Court Theater at Christiansborg Palace. But Laurent's school soon lost its dance lesson monopoly at the Royal Danish Theater. In 1775, the Italian dancer, choreographer, and teacher Vincenzo Galeotti was engaged as ballet master. Galeotti, too, felt the need to establish a school of his own, and for some time the two schools existed side by side.
