= August Bournonville =

Danish ballet master and choreographer (1805–1879)

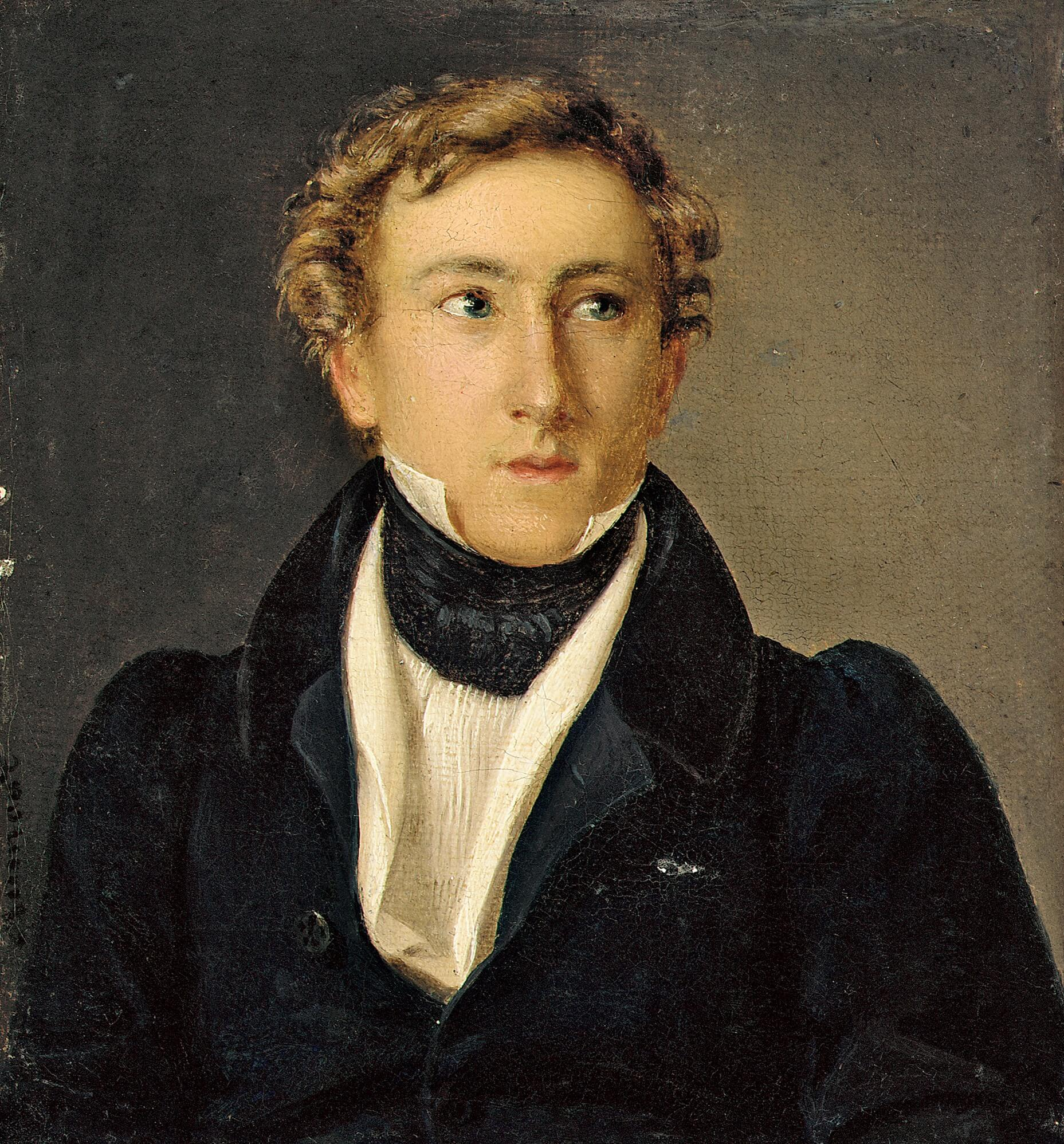
- Portrait by Louis Aumont, 1828
- Born: Antoine Auguste Bournonville; 21 August 1805; Copenhagen, Denmark
- Died: 30 November 1879 (aged 74); Copenhagen, Denmark
- Resting place: Asminderød Cemetery, Fredensborg, Denmark
- Occupations: Ballet Master; Choreographer
- Known for: Bournonville School
- Spouse: Helena Fredrika Håkansson
- Children: 6

August Bournonville (21 August 1805 – 30 November 1879) was a Danish ballet master and choreographer. He was the son of Antoine Bournonville, a dancer and choreographer trained under the French choreographer, Jean Georges Noverre, and the nephew of Julie Alix de la Fay, née Bournonville, of the Royal Swedish Ballet.

Bournonville was born in Copenhagen, Denmark, where his father had settled. He trained with his father Antoine Bournonville. He also studied under the Italian choreographer Vincenzo Galeotti at the Royal Danish Ballet, Copenhagen, and in Paris, France, under French dancer Auguste Vestris. He initiated a unique style in ballet known as the Bournonville School.

Following studies in Paris as a young man, Bournonville became solo dancer at the Royal Ballet in Copenhagen. From 1830 to 1848 he was choreographer for the Royal Danish Ballet, for which he created more than 50 ballets admired for their exuberance, lightness and beauty. He created a style which, although influenced from the Paris ballet, is entirely his own. As a choreographer, he created a number of ballets with varied settings that range from Denmark to Italy, Russia to South America. A limited number of these works have survived.

Bournonville's work became known outside Denmark only after World War II. Since 1950, The Royal Ballet has several times made prolonged tours abroad, not the least to the United States, where they have performed his ballets.

Bournonville's best-known ballets are La Sylphide (1836), Napoli (1842), Le Conservatoire (1849), The Kermesse in Bruges (1851) and A Folk Tale (1854). Later major ballets include Valkyrien, Thrymskviden, Arcona and Fjedstuen.

== Early years ==
Born in Copenhagen on 21 August 1805, Bournonville was the son of the French ballet master Antoine Bournonville, who had settled in Denmark, and Lovisa Sundberg, a Swede. At the age of eight, he entered the Royal Ballet School at the Court Theatre in Christiansborg Palace under the tutelage of his father and Vincenzo Galeotti, ballet master and principal choreographer of the Royal Danish Ballet from 1775 to 1816.

On 2 October 1813, Bournonville made his first stage appearance in a small part as the son of a Viking king in Galeotti's Lagertha, the first ballet on a Nordic theme. Less than a year later, he received his first personal applause for dancing a Hungarian solo at the Court Theatre. In addition to dance, Bournonville was a voracious reader, learned French at home, played the violin, sang in a boy soprano voice, and studied declamation with the actors Michael Rosing, Lindgreen, and Frydensdahl. His many talents were brought together on the Queen's birthday, 29 October 1817, when as a twelve-year-old he played the role of Adonia to royal acclaim in a music-drama, Solomon's Judgment and sang a romance, "The Mother with Her Drooping Wings".

== Family ==
Bournonville had five siblings. Out of the children, he was the only one who showed any interest in dancing. He married Helena Fredrika Håkansson on 23 June 1830. They had seven children, including Charlotte who became an opera singer and actress. Both sons died as toddlers.

== Paris ==
In 1820, Antoine Bournonville received a grant from his sovereign, Frederick VI, to briefly study ballet in Paris. Bournonville accompanied his father to Paris, and, although he studied solely with his father during the Paris sojourn, he was exposed to the latest trends in ballet and watched the illustrious teachers, Gardel and Vestris in action. Upon returning to Denmark, Bournonville became a member of the Royal Theatre, dancing in repertory that was less interesting to him after his exposure to Paris ballet.

In the spring of 1824, Bournonville returned to Paris for final studies and examination preparations at the Paris Opera. The expected fifteen-month sojourn would stretch to five years, during which time Danish ballet would approach near-disastrous decline. In Paris, Bournonville met his father's old friend, Louis Nivelon, who provided him with friendship, meals, and entree into society. Bournonville hoped the master Gardel would accept him but Gardel's studio was no longer in existence and he was directed to Auguste Vestris for training in his weakest areas — "balance, pirouettes, and arms." Vestris accepted Bournonville. Bournonville wrote his father:

I am extremely satisfied with my Mr. Vestris and what is more, he is very pleased with my zeal, diligence, and my instant willingness. He is very exact about the lessons and comes to class three times a week at eight in the morning and three times a week at nine and remains until eleven. I get up every morning at six and always arrive one half hour before the lesson so that I am absolutely prepared when Vestris arrives. He has taken me in friendship and cultivated my talent with extreme care, he rigorously points out my faults but treats me with consideration.

Bournonville danced from 1820 to 1828 with the noted dancer Marie Taglioni and the Paris Opera Ballet.

== Death ==
Bournonville stopped teaching adult classes in the spring of 1877. On returning from church on 30 November 1879, he was stricken and taken to a hospital. Bournonville was interred in Asminderød Churchyard near Fredensborg.

== Legacy ==
Bournonville's work remains an important link with earlier traditions. He resisted many of the excesses of the romantic era ballets in his work. He is noted for his egalitarian choreography, which gave equal emphasis to both male and female roles, at a time when European ballet emphasized the ballerina. Many of his contemporaries explored the extremes of human emotion, while Bournonville, using enthusiastic footwork and fluid phrases in his work, portrayed a more balanced human nature.

== See also ==
- List of ballets by August Bournonville
- Royal Danish Ballet school
