= List of female dancers =

The following is a list of female dancers by nationality – notable women who are well known for their work in the field of dance.

== Africa ==
=== Algeria ===
- Mariquita (1830–1922), early choreographer, director and teacher in Paris, Folies Bergère, Opéra Comique

=== Egypt ===
- Naima Akef (1929–1966), belly dancer, film actress
- Zouba El-Klobatiyya (1917–1972), belly dancer, film actress
- Nagwa Fouad (born 1939), belly dancer
- Nadia Gamal (1937–1990), belly dancer, toured widely including North America
- Samia Gamal (1924–1994), belly dancer, film actress
- Taheyya Kariokka (1919–1999), belly dancer, film actress
- Kuchuk Hanem (1850–1870), erotic dancer
- Nelly Mazloum (1929–2003), belly dancer, show dancer, folklorist, own dance company
- Hanan Tork (born 1975), ballerina, Cairo Ballet Group, later film actress
- Mona El Said (1954-2024), Belly dancer, actress, Internationally acclaimed and dance teacher.

=== South Africa ===
- Kamo Mphela (born 1999), dancer known for dancing Amapiano
- Nadia Nerina (1927–2008), prima ballerina who made her glittering career with The Royal Ballet in London
- Juliet Prowse (1936–1996), Indian-born, stage dancer, starred in Can-Can
- Robyn Hendricks, ballet dancer, principal dancer, The Australian Ballet
- Phyllis Spira (1943–2008), prima ballerina, teacher, performed with Cape Town's CAPAB

== Asia ==
=== Armenia ===
- Armen Ohanian (1887–1976), Oriental dancer

=== Bangladesh ===
- Benazir Salam (born 1979), Indian classical dancer, modern dancer, Odissi teacher

=== China ===
- Dai Ailian (1916 (Trinidad)–2006), modern dancer, choreographer, teacher, first principal of Beijing Dance Academy
- Jin Xing (born 1967 to Korean parents), ballerina, modern dancer, choreographer, actress
- Faye Leung (born 1979), former principal dancer, Hong Kong Ballet
- Yuanyuan Tan (born 1974), principal dancer, San Francisco Ballet
- Xue Jinghua (born 1946), prima ballerina, National Ballet of China
- Nellie Yu Roung Ling (1889–1973), dancer and choreographer, considered the first modern dancer of China.
- Zhu Yan, prima ballerina with the National Ballet of China since 1995

=== Georgia ===
- Maia Makhateli (born c. 1986), ballet dancer, principal dancer, Dutch National Ballet
- Lila Zali (1918–2003), ballet dancer, film actress, American Ballet Theatre, Ballets Russes

=== India ===
- Olive Katherine Craddock (1894–1926), Anglo-Indian dancer who danced under the name of Roshanara
- Rukmini Devi Arundale (1904–1986), Bharata Natyam classical dancer, choreographer
- Methil Devika (born 1977), dancer, choreographer, teacher
- Madhuri Dixit (born 1967), film actress, dance sequences in Bollywood films
- Usha Jey, French-Tamilian dancer
- Geeta Kapoor (born 1973), Bollywood choreographer
- Saroj Khan (born 1948), Bollywood choreographer
- Hema Malini (born 1948), Bharata Natyam dancer, choreographer, actress
- Vaibhavi Merchant (born 1975), Bollywood dancer, choreographer
- Sujata Mohapatra (born 1968), Indian classical dancer, Odissi teacher
- Baisali Mohanty (born 1994), Indian classical dancer and choreographer of Odissi
- Rekha Raju, Mohiniyattam exponent
- Anita Ratnam (born 1954), Indian classical dancer, modern dancer, choreographer
- Mallika Sarabhai (born 1954), classical Indian dancer, choreographer
- Savitha Sastry (born 1969), Indian dancer, choreographer, specializing in Bharata Natyam
- Zohra Sehgal (1912–2014), film actress, modern dancer, choreographer
- Vyjayanthimala (born 1936), classical Indian dancer, choreographer, actress
- Shobana (born 1970), Indian dancer, film actress, choreographer
- Nora Fatehi (born 1992), Indian dancer, film actress, singer
- Rakul Preet Singh, Indian actress, dancer.
- Kriti Sanon, Indian actress, producer, dancer.

=== Indonesia ===
- Gusmiati Suid (1942–2001), dancer and choreographer

=== Iran ===
- Farzaneh Kaboli (born 1949), Iranian folk dancer, ballet dancer, choreographer

=== Israel ===
- Rina Schenfeld (born 1938), prima ballerina, choreographer, Batsheva Dance Company

=== Japan ===
- Motofuji Akiko (1928–2003), ballerina, modern dancer
- Tae-ji Choi (born 1959), ballerina, director, teacher, Korea National Ballet
- Shizuka Gozen (1165–1211), court dancer
- Utako Hanazono (1905–1982), modern dancer, geisha
- Yuriko Kajiya (born 1984), ballet dancer, principal dancer, Houston Ballet
- Maki Kawamura (born 1979), ballerina, New National Theatre Tokyo
- Hikaru Kobayashi (born 1976), ballet dancer, former first soloist, The Royal Ballet
- Ako Kondo (born 1991), ballet dancer, The Australian Ballet
- Misa Kuranaga (born c. 1982), ballet dancer, principal dancer, San Francisco Ballet, formerly Boston Ballet
- Tamiyo Kusakari (born 1965), ballerina, film actress, Maki Asami Ballet Company
- Noriko Ohara (born 1943), ballerina, Scottish Ballet
- Masako Ono, Odissi dancer since 1996
- Shino Mori (born 1989), ballerina, National Ballet of Canada
- Yoko Morishita (born 1948), prima ballerina, director, Matsuyama Ballet Company
- Ayako Nakano (born 1977), ballerina, soloist Theater Basel
- Madoka Sugai, ballet dancer, principal dancer, Hamburg Ballet
- Akane Takada (born 1990), ballet dancer, principal dancer, Royal Ballet
- Erina Takahashi, ballet dancer, lead principal, English National Ballet
- Yumiko Takeshima, designer and former ballet dancer
- Miyako Yoshida (born 1965), former ballet dancer, The Royal Ballet and K-ballet
- Yuriko Kimura, modern dancer, lead principal with Martha Graham Dance Company

=== Kazakhstan ===
- Nadezhda Gracheva (born 1969), prima ballerina, Bolshoi Ballet

=== Lebanon ===
- Layal Abboud (born 1982), concert dancer

=== Nepal ===
- Bandana Nepal (born 2001), record-breaking marathon dancer

=== Pakistan ===
- Suhaee Abro, dancer since 2001, Indian classical dancer, modern dancer, choreographer
- Nargis (born 1974), film actress, stage dancer

=== South Korea ===
- Yuhui Choe, ballet dancer, first soloist, The Royal Ballet
- Ji-Young Kim (born 1978), prima ballerina, Korean National Ballet
- Kang Sue-jin (born 1967), ballerina, Stuttgart Ballet
- Kim Joo-won (born 1976), prima ballerina, Korean National Ballet
- EunWon Lee, prima ballerina, Korean National Ballet
- Young Soon Hue (born 1963), ballerina, choreographer, Deutsche Oper am Rhein
- Sae Eun Park (born 1989), ballet dancer, étoile, Paris Opera Ballet
- Hee Seo (born 1986), ballet dancer, principal dancer, American Ballet Theatre
- Ahn Yoo-jin (born 1968), belly dancer

=== Turkey ===
- Sema Yildiz, belly dancer, Romani Dancer, actress and dance teacher.
- Özel Türkbaş, belly dancer, actress, dance teacher, singer, model.
- Nesrin Topkapı, belly dancer, dance teacher and singer.
- Nejla Ateş, belly dancer and actress.

=== Taiwan ===
- PeiJu Chien-Pott, dancer, Martha Graham Dance Company
- Fang-Yi Sheu, dancer, Martha Graham Dance Company

== Oceania ==
=== Australia ===
- Lucette Aldous (1938–2021), ballerina, teacher with the Australian Ballet
- Leanne Benjamin (born 1964), former ballet dancer, principal dancer, Royal Ballet
- Madeleine Eastoe, former ballet dancer, principal artist, Australian Ballet
- Roma Egan (born 1948), senior soloist, Australian Ballet
- Jean Garling (1907–1998), ballet dancer
- Amy Harris (born 1983), ballet dancer, principal artist, Australian Ballet
- Ella Havelka, ballet dancer, first indigenous dancer at Australian Ballet
- Margaret Illmann (born 1965), ballerina, National Ballet of Canada
- Lana Jones, former ballet dancer, Australian Ballet
- Marilyn Jones (born 1940), ballerina, director, Australian Ballet
- Dena Kaplan (born 1989), dancer, actress, film roles
- Stephanie Kurlow, ballet dancer
- Kirsty Martin (born 1976), principal dancer, Australian Ballet
- Laurel Martyn (1916–2013), ballerina, Australian Ballet, Vic-Wells Ballet
- Danielle Rowe (born 1982), ballet dancer and choreographer
- Amber Scott, ballet dancer, principal dancer, The Australian Ballet
- Margaret Scott (1922 (South Africa)–2019), ballerina, Ballet Rambert, Australian Ballet, director of the Australian Ballet School
- Dana Stephensen (born c. 1984), ballerina, Australian Ballet
- Sharni Spencer, Australian ballet dancer, graduate of New Zealand School of Dance
- Meryl Tankard (born 1955), ballet dancer, choreographer, director Australian Dance Theatre
- Tamara Tchinarova (1919 (Romania)–2017), ballet dancer Ballets Russes, Borovansky Ballet
- Stephanie Williams, ballet dancer, American Ballet Theatre

=== New Zealand ===
- Claire Ahuriri-Dunning
- Rona Bailey (1914–2005) – drama and dance practitioner, educationalist and activist
- Jan Bolwell
- Yvonne Cartier (c. 1930–2014) – ballet dancer, choreographer, teacher of mime and movement, based in Paris
- Lisa Densem
- Lusi Faiva – known for physically integrated dance
- Sarah-Jayne Howard – dancer and choreographer
- Bianca Hyslop – dancer and choreographer
- Rowena Jackson (1926–2024) – prima ballerina, Sadler's Wells Ballet, Royal Ballet
- Malia Johnston – choreographer
- Susan Jordan – dancer and choreographer
- June Kerr – dancer
- Cathy Livermore – dancer
- Tupe Lualua – choreographer and director of Le Moana and the Measina Festival
- Lucy Marinkovich – dancer, choreographer
- Sara Neil (dancer)
- Hannah O'Neill (born 1993) – ballet dancer, premier danseur, Paris Opera Ballet
- Patricia Rianne – ballet dancer and choreographer
- Turid Revfeim
- Anne Rowse – dancer
- Cat Ruka – dancer and choreographer
- Amanaki Prescott-Faletau – actor, writer, dancer, choreographer, producer and director
- Louise Potiki Bryant – choreographer, dancer, video artist
- Gaylene Sciascia
- Deirdre Tarrant – dancer, choreographer

== Europe ==
=== Austria ===
- Kathrin Beck (born 1966), ice dancer, actress
- Gertrud Bodenwieser (1890–1959), dancer, choreographer, teacher, pioneer of expressive dance
- Trudl Dubsky (1913–1976), innovative dancer, choreographer, teacher
- Poldi Dur (1917–1996), dancer, actress
- Fanny Elssler (1810–1884), ballerina, Ballet du Théâtre de l'Académie Royale de Musique (now the Paris Opera), toured widely
- Therese Elssler (1808–1878), ballerina, sister of Fanny Elssler
- Angelika Führing (born 1976), ice dancer
- Susi Handschmann (born 1959), ice dancer
- Lilian Harmel (1908–1982), dancer, choreographer, teacher
- Barbara Herzog (born 1985), ice dancer
- Saskia Hölbling (born 1971), modern dancer, choreographer
- Hilde Holger (1905–2001), expressionist dancer, choreographer, teacher
- Katti Lanner (1829–1908), ballet dancer, choreographer, Viennese Ballet Company, Drury Lane
- Maria Ley-Piscator (1898–1999), dancer, choreographer
- Tilly Losch (1903–1975), ballet dancer, show dancer, choreographer, trained at the Vienna Opera, later turned to musicals including The Band Wagon
- Natascha Mair, ballet dancer, first soloist, Vienna State Ballet
- Daria-Larissa Maritczak (born 1970s), ice dancer
- Kathrin Menzinger (born 1988), competitive ballroom dancer
- Albertina Rasch (1891–1967), ballerina, show dancer, choreographer, remembered for her extensive work in American musicals
- Brigitte Scheijbal (fl. 1970s), ice dancer
- Babsie Steger (born 1968), dancer, actress, television presenter
- Eva Marie Veigel (1724–1822), early dancer in London
- Cilli Wang (1909–2005), Austrian-born Dutch dancer, cabaret artist
- Grete Wiesenthal (1891–1967), ballet dancer, worked with Max Reinhardt

=== Belgium ===
- Akarova (1904–1999), ballet dancer, choreographer, performed in various venues in Brussels
- Jeanne Brabants (1920–2014), dancer, choreographer, teacher
- Veerle Casteleyn (born 1978), ballerina, show dancer, performing in Belgian musicals
- Lydia Chagoll (1931–2020), dancer, choreographer, screenwriter, actress
- Bernice Coppieters (born 1970), ballet dancer, étoile and principal ballet master of the Ballets de Monte-Carlo
- Anne Teresa De Keersmaeker (born 1960), contemporary dancer, choreographer
- Julie Alix de la Fay (c. 1746–1826), ballet dancer, teacher, helped develop the Royal Swedish Ballet
- Joanna Leunis (born 1981), Latin ballroom dancer
- Annabelle Lopez Ochoa (born 1973), choreographer
- Andrée Marlière (1934–2008), ballet dancer, teacher, danced mainly in Belgian and German companies including the Flemish Opera
- Adeline Plunkett (1824–1910), star of the Paris Opera Ballet
- Ira Vannut (born 1994), ice dancer

=== Bulgaria ===
- Albena Denkova (born 1974), ice dancer
- Maria Filippov (born 1973), ice dancer
- Petya Gavazova (born 1968), ice dancer
- Mila Iskrenova (born 1960), modern dancer, choreographer

=== Croatia ===
- Nikolina Nikoleski (born 1976), dancer and choreographer of Bharatanatyam

=== Czech Republic ===
- Jana Andrsová (1939–2023), ballet dancer, actress
- Jitka Babická (born 1939), ice dancer
- Radmila Chroboková (born 1976), ice dancer
- Anka Čekanová (1905–1965), dancer, choreographer
- Kamila Hájková (born 1987), ice dancer
- Jindra Holá (born 1960), ice dancer
- Dana Holanová (fl, 1960s), ice dancer
- Gabriela Hrázská (born 1979), ice dancer
- Diana Janošťáková (born 1984), ice dancer
- Jarmila Jeřábková (1912–1989), modern dancer, choreographer, taught Isadora Duncan's method
- Daria Klimentová (born 1971), ballet dancer, former principal dancer, National Theatre Ballet, English National Ballet, teacher, Royal Ballet School
- Kateřina Kovalová (born 1978), ice dancer
- Jarmila Kröschlová (1893–1983), modern dancer, choreographer, teacher
- Gabriela Kubová (born 1993), ice dancer
- Leona Kvasnicová (born 1972), dancer, choreographer
- Nikola Márová (born 1980), prima ballerina, National Theatre (Prague)
- Kateřina Mrázová (born 1972), ice dancer
- Veronika Morávková (born 1983), ice dancer
- Lucie Myslivečková (born 1989), ice dancer
- Eva Peštová (born 1952), ice dancer
- Anna Pisánská (fl. 1970s), ice dancer
- Liliana Řeháková (1958–2008), ice dancer
- Viera Řeháková (born 1964), ice dancer
- Eva Romanová (born 1946), ice dancer
- Barbora Silná (born 1989), Czech-Austrian ice dancer
- Diana Skotnická (born 1940s), ice dancer
- Ivana Střondalová (born 1970), ice dancer
- Milena Tůmová (fl. 1960s), ice dancer
- Nikola Višňová (born 1992), ice dancer
- Šárka Vondrková (born 1976), ice dancer
- Jana Zangiová (fl 1980s), ice dancer

=== Denmark ===
- Marie Barch
- Dinna Bjørn (born 1947), prima ballerina, choreographer, ballet mistress, Royal Danish Ballet
- Mette Bødtcher (born 1965), balletna, trained and danced at the Royal Danish Theatre
- Gudrun Bojesen (born 1976), principal dancer, Royal Danish Ballet
- Edith von Bonsdorff (1890–1968), ballet dancer
- Valborg Borchsenius (1872–1949), soloist with the Royal Danish ballet, later an instructor
- Ida Brun (1792–1857), singer, dancer, mine artist
- Camilla Dallerup (born 1974), ballroom dancer, coach
- Eva Eklund (1922–2015), Swedish-born Danish dancer, singer, composer
- Vivi Flindt (born 1943), soloist with the Royal Danish Ballet, now a choreographer
- Laurence Fournier Beaudry (born 1992), ice dancer
- Anine Frølich (1762–1784), ballerina, first native Dane in the Royal Danish Ballet
- Adeline Genée (1878–1970), ballerina, Royal Danish Ballet, later classical ballet and music hall roles at Empire, Leicester Square, in New York and Sydney
- Gerda Karstens (1903–1988), ballerina, Royal Danish Ballet
- Lucile Grahn (1819–1907), ballerina, Royal Danish Ballet, performed widely across Europe
- Susanne Grinder (born 1981), principal dancer, Royal Danish Ballet
- Eline Heger (1774–1842), ballet dancer, Royal Danish Ballet
- Else Højgaard (1906–1979), ballerina, stage and film actress, Royal Danish Theatre
- Mette Ingvarsten (active since 2003), Danish dancer, choreographer and performance artist
- Lis Jeppesen (born 1956), soloist with the Royal Danish Ballet
- Andrea Krætzmer (1811–1889), soloist in August Bournonville's early ballets
- Mette Hønningen (born 1944), principal at the Royal Danish Ballet
- Charlotte Jørgensen (born 1972), ballroom dancer
- Hélène Kirsova (1910–1962), ballerina, choreographer, director
- Margot Lander (1910–1961), born in Oslo, Denmark's first prima ballerina, Royal Danish Ballet
- Anna Lærkesen (born 1942), soloist at the Royal Danish Ballet
- Elna Lassen (1901–1930), ballerina, Royal Danish Ballet
- Gitte Lindstrøm (born 1975), principal dancer, teacher, Royal Danish Ballet
- Charlotte Jørgensen (born 1987), dancer, singer, actress
- Asta Mollerup (1881–1945), brought modern dance to Denmark
- Augusta Nielsen (1822–1902), ballerina, performed as a soloist in Bournonville's ballets
- Elna Ørnberg (1890–1969), ballerina, performed as a soloist in Bournonville's ballets
- Ulla Poulsen (1905–2001), soloist with the Royal Danish Ballet, also an actress
- Ida Praetorius (born 1993), ballet dancer, principal dancer, Royal Danish Ballet
- Ellen Price (1878–1968), prima ballerina, Royal Danish Ballet
- Juliette Price (1831–1906), prima ballerina, Royal Danish Ballet, worked closely with August Bournonville
- Kirsten Ralov (1922–1999), ballerina, ballet mistress, associate director, Royal Danish Ballet
- Louise Rasmussen (1815–1874), ballet dancer and stage actor, Royal Danish Ballet
- Johanne Rosing (1756–1853), actress, ballet dancer
- Margrethe Schall (1775–1852), ballerina, Royal Danish Ballet
- Silja Schandorff (born 1969), ballerina, Royal Danish Ballet
- Delia Sheppard (born 1961), actress, model, singer, ballet dancer
- Kirsten Simone (1934–2024), first soloist Royal Danish Ballet
- Nini Theilade (1915–2018), ballet dancer, choreographer, starred in the film A Midsummer Night's Dream
- Valda Valkyrien (1895–1956), Iceland-born prima ballerina, Royal Danish Ballet, later silent film actress in the United States
- Mona Vangsaae (1920–1983), ballet dancer, choreographer and instructor
- Emilie Walbom (1858–1932), ballet dancer, choreographer, ballet mistress

=== Estonia ===
- Johanna Allik (born 1994), ice dancer
- Grethe Grünberg (born 1988), ice dancer
- Anna Mosenkova (born 1973), ice dancer
- Agnes Oaks (born 1970), ballet dancer, former principal dancer, English National Ballet
- Irina Shtork (born 1993), ice dancer
- Marina Timofeieva (born 1984), ice dancer

=== Finland ===
- Ritva Arvelo (1921–2013), actress, screenwriter, pioneer in modern dance
- Sorella Englund (born 1945), soloist, character dancer, teacher, Royal Danish Ballet
- Alina Frasa (1834–1899), Finnish ballet dancer and choreographer
- Maggie Gripenberg (1881–1976), pioneer of modern dance in Finland
- Hanna Haarala (active since 2000s), Latin American dancer
- Irja Hagfors (1905–1988), dancer, choreographer, dance teacher
- Jessica Huot (born 1983), ice dancer
- Olesia Karmi (born 1992), ice dancer
- Hanna Karttunen (fl. 2000s), Latin American dancer
- Oona Kivelä (born 1983), professional dancer, pole dancer
- Jaana Kunitz (born 1972), ballroom dancer, dance instructor
- Monica Lindfors (born 2000), ice dancer
- Henna Lindholm (born 1989), ice dancer
- Marja Merisalo (born 1965), choreographer, dancer, director
- Cleo Nordi (1898–1983), prima ballerina with Anna Pavlova, choreographer and teacher in London
- Susanna Rahkamo (born 1965), ice dancer
- Sirpa Suutari (fl. 1990s), professional ballroom dancer
- Cecilia Törn (born 1994), ice dancer
- Satu Tuomisto, active since 2000, contemporary dance choreographer
- Anu Viheriäranta (born 1982), principal dancer, Dutch National Ballet
- Maikki Uotila (born 1977), ice dancer

=== France ===
- Françoise Adret (1920–2018), ballet dancer, teacher, choreographer, director
- Émilienne d'Alençon (1869–1946), dancer, actress, courtesan
- Marie Allard (1738–1802), ballerina, Comédie-Française, Paris Opera Ballet
- Mademoiselle Ambroisine (1811–1882), prima ballerina, leading lady of romantic ballet in Brussels
- Madame Anatole (1793–?), prima ballerina, Paris Opera Ballet
- Anne and Janneton Auretti (fl 1740–1760)
- Jane Avril (1868–1943), can-can dancer, Moulin Rouge
- Josephine Baker (1906–1975), American-born erotic dancer, singer, entertainer, Folies Bergère, also in films
- Léonore Baulac (born 1989), ballet dancer, étoile of the Paris Opera Ballet
- Claude Bessy (1932–2026), ballerina, teacher, Paris Opera Ballet
- Émilie Bigottini (1784–1858), ballerina, Paris Opera Ballet
- Doriane Bontemps (born 1967), ice dancer
- Emmanuelle Bouaziz (active since 2007), actress, dancer, singer
- Hélène Bouchet (born 1980), ballet dancer, principal dancer, Hamburg Ballet
- Muriel Boucher-Zazoui (fl 1970s), ice dancer
- Olympe Bradna (1920–2012), dancer, actress
- Roxane Butterfly (active since 1998), tap dancer, choreographer
- Rita Cadillac (1936–1995), exotic dancer
- Vanessa Cailhol (active since 2004), dancer, singer
- Leslie Caron (born 1931), ballerina, film actress, starred in Gigi
- Pernelle Carron (born 1986), ice dancer
- Céline Céleste (1815–1882), ballerina
- Marie-Adrienne Chameroy (1779–1802), dancer at the Paris Opera
- Jeanne Chasles (1869–1939), dancer, choreographer and professor
- Cha-U-Kao, dancer and clown
- Jeanne Chasles (1869–1939), dancer, choreographer at the Opéra Comique
- Yvette Chauviré (1917–2016), prima ballerina, director, Paris Opera Ballet
- Isabelle Ciaravola (born 1972), ballet dancer, étoile of the Paris Opera Ballet
- Valentine Colasante (born 1989), ballet dancer
- Émilie Cozette (born 1981), ballerina
- Polly Cuninghame (1785–1837), ballerina, active in Amsterdam, Stadsschouwburg
- Marie Anne de Cupis de Camargo (1710–1770), prima ballerina, Paris Opera Ballet,
- Sophie Daguin (1801–1881), ballerina, choreographer, Royal Swedish Opera
- Suzette Defoye (1741–1787), ballet dancer, actress, opera singer
- Isabelle Delobel (born 1978), ice dancer
- Véronique Delobel (born 1978), ice dancer
- Davina Delor (born 1952), dancer, choreographer, Buddhist nun
- Bintou Dembélé (born 1975), pioneering hip hop dancer, choreographer
- Dominique Deniaud (born 1977), ice dancer
- Gaby Deslys (1881–1920), show dancer, singer, actress,
- Suzanne Douvillier (1778–1826), ballerina, choreographer
- Adèle Dumilâtre (1821–1909), prima ballerina, Paris Opera Ballet, Drury Lane, La Scala
- Aurélie Dupont (born 1973), director and former ballet dancer and artistic director, Paris Opera Ballet
- Pauline Duvernay (1812–1894), ballerina,
- Estelle Elizabeth (born 1996), ice dancer
- Eugénie Fiocre (1845–1908), ballerina, Paris Opera Ballet, often in male roles
- Louise Fitzjames (born 1809), ballet dancer with the Paris Opera
- Mathilde Froustey (born 1985), ballet dancer, principal dancer, San Francisco Ballet
- Dorothée Gilbert (born 1983), ballerina
- Marie-Agnès Gillot (born c. 1974), ballet dancer, choreographer
- Geneviève Gosselin (1791–1818), ballerina, Paris Opera Ballet
- La Goulue (1866–1929), can-can dancer, Moulin Rouge
- Isabelle Guérin (born 1961), ballet dancer, principal dancer with Paris Opera Ballet
- Christiane Guhel (born 1962), ice dancer
- Sylvie Guillem (born 1965), ballerina, choreographer, contemporary dancer
- Marie-Madeleine Guimard (1743–1816), ballerina
- Nathalie Hervé (born 1963), ice dancer
- Fauve Hautot (born 1986), dancer, choreographer
- Zizi Jeanmaire (1924–2020), ballet dancer, film actress,
- Katherine Kath (1920–2012), prima ballerina, Théâtre du Châtelet
- Dominique Khalfouni (born 1951), ballerina, teacher, Paris Opera Ballet, Ballet National de Marseille
- De Lafontaine (1655–1738), ballerina
- Brigitte Lefèvre (born 1944), dancer, choreographer, director of the Paris Opera Ballet
- Marcelle Lender (1862–1926), stage dancer, singer, Théâtre des Variétés, painted by Toulouse-Lautrec
- Marie Lesueur (1799–1890), ballet dancer, Théâtre de Marseille, Théâtre de la Monnaie
- Agnès Letestu (born 1971), ballerina
- Emma Livry (1842–1863), ballerina, romantic ballet, Paris Opera, died after her clothes caught fire on stage
- Sophie Lothaire (1732–?), dancer, actress, director, active in Brussels
- Monique Loudières (born 1956), ballet dancer, teacher,
- Mariquita (1830–1922), see Algeria
- Brigitte Martin (fl 1960s), ice dancer
- Sophie Martin (born 1984), ballet dancer, principal dancer, Scottish Ballet
- Genia Melikova (1924–2004), ballerina, choreographer, teacher
- Cléo de Mérode (1875–1966), dancer, international star
- Antonine Meunier (1877–1972), ballet dancer, teacher, writer
- Magali Messac (fl 1969), ballet dancer
- Sophie Moniotte (born 1969), ice dancer
- Madame Montessu (1803–1877), prima ballerina, Paris Opera Ballet
- Marion Motin (active since 2006), dancer, choreographer
- Marguerite Morel (1737–1804), ballerina, opera singer, active in Sweden at Bollhuset
- Bérangère Nau (born 1976), ice dancer
- Stacia Napierkowska (1891–1945), dancer, film actress
- Lise Noblet (1801–1852), ballerina, Paris Opera Ballet
- Clairemarie Osta (born 1970), former ballet dancer
- Martine Olivier (fl 1970s), ice dancer
- Alia Ouabdelsselam (born 1978), ice dancer
- Myriam Ould-Braham (born 1982), ballerina
- Ludmila Pagliero (born 1983), see Argentina
- Corinne Paliard (born 1970), ice dancer
- Gabriella Papadakis (born 1995), ice dancer
- Mademoiselle Parisot (c. 1775–after 1837), opera singer, ballet dancer, King's Theatre
- Nathalie Péchalat (born 1983), ice dancer
- Roxane Petetin (born 1981), ice dancer
- Sonia Petrovna (born 1952), ballerina, actress
- Marie-Claude Pietragalla (born 1963), dancer, choreographer
- Wilfride Piollet (1943–2015), ballerina, choreographer
- Barbara Piton (born 1977), ice dancer
- Élisabeth Platel (born 1959), prima ballerina, Paris Opera Ballet
- Françoise Prévost (c. 1680–1741), ballerina
- Liane de Pougy (1869–1950), courtesan, cabaret dancer, Folies Bergère
- Laetitia Pujol (born 1975), ballet dancer
- Alice Renavand (born 1980), ballet dancer,

- Rigolboche (1842–1920), stage dancer, possibly invented the can-can
- Marie Sallé (1707–1756), prima ballerina, first female choreographer, Paris Opera Ballet, Lincoln's Inn Fields Theatre, London
- Marie Sanlaville (1847–1930), prima ballerina, Paris Opera Ballet, often in male roles
- Magali Sauri (born 1977), ice dancer
- Élisabeth Soligny (1749–?), prima ballerina, ballet mistress, Royal Swedish Ballet
- Louise Stichel (1856–after 1933), dancer, ballet master
- Agnès Souret (1902–1928), show dancer, actress, winner of first Miss France contest
- Marie-Thérèse de Subligny (1666–1735), prima ballerina, Paris Opera Ballet, first professional ballet dancer to appear in England (1702)
- Marina Svetlova (1922–2009), ballerina, Original Ballet Russe, Metropolitan Opera Ballet
- Ludmilla Tchérina (1924–2004), prima ballerina, Ballet des Champs-Élysées
- Ghislaine Thesmar (born 1943), prima ballerina, choreographer, Ballets de Monte-Carlo
- Caroline Truong (born 1980), ice dancer
- Marie van Goethem (born 1865, death unknown), dancer, model
- Violette Verdy (1933–2016), ballerina, Ballet des Champs-Élysées, New York City Ballet, director of Paris Opera Ballet
- Adorée Villany (1891–19??), dancer, choreographer
- Dominique Yvon (born 1968), ice dancer

=== Germany ===
- Ruth Abramovitsch Sorel (1907–1974), dancer, choreographer, director, active in Canada
- Karin von Aroldingen (1941–2018), ballet dancer, former principal dancer with New York City Ballet
- Annerose Baier (born 1946), ice dancer
- Pina Bausch (1940–2009), dancer and choreographer, company founder, Tanztheater
- Antonia Becherer (born 1963), ice dancer
- Christina Beier (born 1984), ice dancer
- Lotte Berk (1913–2003), ballet dancer, teacher
- Anita Berber (1899–1928), cabaret dancer in Berlin
- Hannelore Bey (born 1941), ballerina, Komische Oper Berlin
- Petra Born (born 1965), ice dancer
- Sonja Bragowa (1903–1998), expressionist dancer, revue dancer
- Angelika Buck (born 1950), ice dancer
- Ursula Cain (1927–2011), modern dancer, ballet dancer, teacher, Leipzig Opera, television appearances
- Marlene Charell (born 1944), modern dancer, Le Lido
- Ursula Deinert (1910–1988), dancer, film actress
- Clotilde von Derp (1892–1974), expressionist dancer, partner and wife of Alexander Sakharoff
- Jutta Deutschland (born 1958), prima ballerina, Komische Oper Berlin
- Hertha Feist (1896–1990), expressionist dancer, combining gymnastics, nudity and dance
- Stefanie Frohberg (born 1991), ice dancer
- Yvonne Georgi (1903–1975), ballerina, choreographer, ballet mistress
- Valeska Gert (1892–1978), cabaret dancer, film actress, also in the United States
- Tatjana Gsovsky (1901–1993), see Russia
- Grit Hegesa (1891–1972), dancer, silent film actress
- Anna Heinel (1753–1808), ballerina, Paris Opera
- Heike Hennig (born 1966), modern dancer, choreographer, teacher, active mainly in Leipzig
- Ida Herion (1896–1959), modernist dance teacher in Stuttgart
- Carolina Hermann (born 1988), ice dancer
- Reinhild Hoffmann (born 1966), show dancer
- Hanya Holm (1893–1992), major contributor to modern dance in the United States, especially Broadway musicals
- Dore Hoyer (1911–1967), expressionist dancer, choreographer, teacher, associate of Mary Wigman
- La Jana (1905–1940), Austrian-born cabaret dancer, film actress
- Karina Jäger-von Stülpnagel, ballet dancer, former soloist with Royal Ballet of Flanders
- Birgit Keil (born 1944), prima ballerina, teacher, Stuttgart Ballet
- Tiger Kirchharz (born 1985), show dancer, choreographer and actress, also in the United States
- Franziska Romana Koch (1748–1796), ballet dancer, soprano singer, actress
- Shari Koch (born 1993), ice dancer
- Tanja Kolbe (born 1990), ice dancer
- Gertrud Leistikow (1885–1948), show dancer, teacher in Amsterdam
- Rosemarie Lindt (born 1939), ballet dancer, film actress
- Maria Litto (1919–1996), prima ballerina, choreographer, film actress, pioneered dance on German television
- Kavita Lorenz (born 1995), ice dancer
- Jo Mihaly (1902–1989), expressionist dancer, writer, fled to Zurich
- Katharina Müller (born 1995), ice dancer
- Nicole Nau (born 1963), Argentine tango dancer, show director
- Lea Niako (1908–?), exotic dancer, film actress
- Anneliese von Oettingen (1917–2002), ballerina, choreographer, teacher, taught ballet and modern dance in Cincinnati
- Edith Oß (1914–2012), dancer, film actress
- Gret Palucca (1902–1993), dancer, teacher in Berlin and post-war East Germany
- Eva Prawitz (1920–2013), ice dancer
- Laya Raki (1927–2018), dancer, film actress
- Stephanie Rauer (born 1979), ice dancer
- Edel von Rothe (1925–2008), prima ballerina, ballet mistress, Deutsche Oper am Rhein
- Sonia Santiago (born 1966), ballet dancer and teacher
- Steffi Scherzer (born 1957), prima ballerina, Berlin State Opera, instructor in Zurich
- Ria Schiffner (born 1996), ice dancer
- Bessie Schonberg (1906–1997), modern dancer, choreographer, teacher, active mainly in New York
- Yvonne Schulz (born 1974), ice dancer
- Rina Thieleke (born 1987), ice dancer
- Natascha Trofimowa (1923–1979), prima ballerina, German State Opera, Bavarian State Opera
- Georgette Tsinguirides (born 1928), ballet dancer, ballet mistress, choreologist
- Konstanze Vernon (1939–2013), prima ballerina, teacher, Bavarian State Opera
- Carmen Vincelj (born 1972), ballroom dancer
- Jill Vernekohl (born 1980), ice dancer
- Sasha Waltz (born 1963), modern dancer, choreographer, director, active in Berlin
- Sybil Werden (1924–2007), dancer, film actress
- Mary Wigman (1886–1973), expressionist dancer, choreographer, teacher, important figure in modern dance, taught in Dresden and post-war Berlin
- Marianne Winkelstern (1910–1966), dancer, film actress
- Kati Winkler (born 1974), ice dancer
- Greta Wrage von Pustau (1902–1989), dancer, dance teacher

=== Greece ===
- Toula Limnaios (born 1963), dancer, choreographer, based in Germany
- Tatiana Mamaki (1921–2007), ballerina, choreographer, teacher, ballet of the Greek National Opera
- Evelina Papoulia (born 1971), modern dancer, actress
- Dora Stratou (1903–1988), Greek folk dancer

=== Hungary ===
- Krisztina Barta (born 1991), ice dancer
- Ilona Berecz (born 1975), ice dancer
- Ilona Berecz (born 1947), ice dancer, coach
- Valéria Dienes (1879–1978), dancer, choreographer, and movement theorist
- Steffi Duna (1910–1992), dancer, film actress in the United States
- Klára Engi (born 1967), ice dancer
- Zita Gebora (born 1982), ice dancer
- Nóra Hoffmann (born 1985), ice dancer
- Györgyi Korda (born 1964), ice dancer
- Nora Kovach (1931–2009), ballerina, Budapest State Opera, Festival Ballet, London
- Edit Mató (born 1966), ice dancer
- Zsuzsanna Nagy (born 1986), ice dancer
- Judit Péterfy (born 1960s), ice dancer
- Kornélia Pongo (born 1976), ice dancer
- Krisztina Regőczy (born 1955), ice dancer
- Gabriella Remport (active 1978–1984), ice dancer
- Enikő Somorjai (born 1981), ballet dancer
- Bianca Szíjgyártó (born 1981), ice dancer
- Dóra Turóczi (born 1990), ice dancer

=== Iceland ===
- Hanna Rún Óladóttir (born 1990), ballroom dancer
- Þórhildur Þorleifsdóttir (born 1945), actress, dancer, choreographer, cultural director

=== Ireland ===
- Jean Butler (born 1971), Irish step dancer
- Marguerite Donlon (born 1966), ballerina, choreographer, director, working mainly in Germany
- Joanne Doyle (born 1973), dancer, Riverdance specialist
- Bernadette Flynn (born 1979), Irish dancer, show dancer, performed in musical Lord of the Dance
- Margaret Kelly Leibovici (1910–2004), show dancer in Paris
- Monica Loughman (born c. 1978), ballerina, joined the Russian Perm Opera and Ballet Theatre in 1992, founder and director of Ireland's Monica Loughman Ballet
- Lola Montez (1821–1861), dancer, courtesan
- Joan Denise Moriarty (c. 1912–1992), ballerina, choreographer, traditional Irish dancer, founder of professional ballet in Ireland
- Gillian Norris (born 1978), show dancer
- Ciara Sexton (born 1988), five time world champion Irish dancer who toured with the Lord of the Dance
- Ninette de Valois (1898–2001), ballerina, choreographer, director, founded Vic-Wells Ballet which became the Royal Ballet

=== Italy ===
- Eleonora Abbagnato (born 1978), ballet dancer, étoile at the Paris Opera Ballet
- Lorenza Alessandrini (born 1990), ice dancer
- Silvia Azzoni (born 1973), ballet dancer, principal dancer, Hamburg Ballet
- Giovanna Baccelli (1753–1801), ballerina, moved to London
- Teresa Bandettini (1763–1837), dancer, poet
- Giovanna Bassi (1762–1834), ballerina based in Sweden
- Alice Bellagamba (born 1987), dancer, actress
- Brunilde Bianchi (born 1964), ice dancer
- Giuseppina Bozzacchi (1853–1870), ballerina, Paris Opera
- Sabrina Brazzo (born 1968), prima ballerina, La Scala Ballet
- Carlotta Brianza (1865–1938), prima ballerina, La Scala, Mariinsky Theatre
- Amalia Brugnoli (1802–1892), ballerina, first to have used the pointe technique
- Alessia Busi (born 1994), ice dancer
- Stefania Calegari (born 1967), ice dancer
- Barbara Campanini (1721–1799), ballerina, actress, Paris Opera
- Anna Cappellini (born 1987), ice dancer
- Fanny Cerrito (1817–1909), ballerina, early female choreographer, Paris Opera, La Scala
- Matilde Ciccia (born 1952), ice dancer
- Petra Conti (born 1988), ballet dancer, principal dancer with Los Angeles Ballet
- Lucia Cormani (c.1854–c.1934), ballet dancer, choreographer, teacher
- Antonietta Dell'Era (1861–1945), prima ballerina, active in St Petersberg and Berlin
- Oriella Dorella (born 1952), étoile with La Scala Theatre Ballet
- Viviana Durante (born 1967), prima ballerina, Royal Ballet, La Scala
- Federica Faiella (born 1981), ice dancer
- Amalia Ferraris (1828–1904), ballerina, Theatre Royal, Paris Opera
- Alessandra Ferri (born 1963), prima ballerina assoluta, active with the Royal Ballet, American Ballet Theatre and La Scala Theatre Ballet
- Carla Fracci (1936–2021), prima ballerina, choreographer, ballat mistress, La Scala, Teatro dell'Opera di Roma
- Sofia Fuoco (1830–1916), ballet dancer, performed in Paris and London
- Barbara Fusar-Poli (born 1972), ice dancer
- Mara Galeazzi (born 1973), ballet dancer, former principal dancer, the Royal Ballet
- Rosina Galli (1892–1940), prima ballerina at La Scala Theatre Ballet, Chicago Ballet, as well as the première danseuse of the Metropolitan Opera House
- Gilda Gelati (born 1967), prima ballerina, La Scala Theatre Ballet
- Diane Gerencser (born 1972), ice dancer
- Sara Ghislandi (born 1998), ice dancer
- Carlotta Grisi (1819–1899), prima ballerina, famous for her Giselle, Paris Opera, Imperial Ballet
- Tiziana Lauri (born 1959), ballet dancer with the Rome Opera Ballet
- Pierina Legnani (1863–1930), prima ballerina with La Scala, later with Russia's Imperial Ballet
- Daniela Malusardi (born 1956), choreographer, teacher, dancer
- Nicoletta Manni (born 1991), prima ballerina, La Scala Theatre Ballet
- Liliana Merlo (1925–2002), pioneer of classical ballet in Abruzzo
- Giuseppina Morlacchi (1946–1886), Italian-American dancer, introduced the can-can to the American stage
- Carolina Moscheni (born 1996), ice dancer
- Flavia Ottaviani (born 1981), ice dancer
- Isabella Pajardi (born 1989), ice dancer
- Giuliana Penzi (1918–2008), ballet dancer, choreographer, teacher, co-founder of the Rome Academy
- Maria Perini (1873–1939), ballet teacher in Tbilisi
- Camilla Pistorello (born 1987), ice dancer
- Attilia Radice (1914–1980), prima ballerina, teacher, La Scala, Rome Opera
- Sara Renda (born 1991), ballet dancer, étoile at the Opéra National de Bordeaux
- Carolina Rosati (1826–1905), prima ballerina, Paris Opera Ballet, Imperial Ballet in St Petersburg
- Rita Sangalli (1849–1909), prima ballerina, Paris Opera Ballet
- Luciana Savignano (born 1943), prima ballerina
- Delia Scala (1929–2004), ballerina, actress
- Sofia Sforza (born 1995), ice dancer
- Camilla Spelta (born 1988), ice dancer
- Marie Taglioni (1804–1884), see Sweden
- Federica Testa (born 1983), ice dancer
- Lia Trovati (born 1965), ice dancer
- Odette Valery (1883–?), dancer, noted for dancing with snakes
- Ambra Vallo (fl 1990s), principal with the Birmingham Royal Ballet
- Carlotta Zambelli (1875–1968), prima ballerina, teacher, Paris Opera
- Virginia Zucchi (1849–1933), ballerina, teacher, danced in Russia

=== Latvia ===
- Tatjana Barbakoff (1899–1944), ballet dancer, Chinese style dancer
- Ludmilla Chiriaeff (1924–1996), Latvian-Canadian dancer, choreographer, teacher, and company director
- Elza Leimane (born 1984), ballet dancer whose father, Aivars Leimanis, is artistic director of Latvia's National Ballet
- Simona Orinska (born 1978), butoh artist, choreographer, dance movement therapy

=== Lithuania ===
- Svetlana Beriosova (1932–1998), prima ballerina, Royal Ballet
- Sonia Gaskell (1904–1974), dancer, choreographer, teacher, artistic director of the Dutch National Ballet
- Jurgita Dronina (born 1986), ballet dancer, principal dancer, National Ballet of Canada, formerly English National Ballet, Dutch National Ballet, Royal Swedish Ballet
- Aušra Gineitytė (born 1962), ballet dancer and pedagogue
- Tamara Kalibataitė (1926–2010), dancer and choreographer
- Elena Kepalaitė (born 1920), sculptor, painter and dancer
- Aira Naginevičiutė (born 1965), dancer, choreographer and teacher
- Eglė Špokaitė (born 1971), ballet dancer, prima ballerina of the Lithuanian National Opera and ballet theater (1989–2011)

=== Luxembourg ===
- Germaine Damar (born 1929), stage dancer, film actress

=== Netherlands ===
- Maria Francisca Bia (1809–1889), ballerina, opera singer
- Marie Bovet (born 1948), prima ballerina, Dutch National Ballet, 1968 (under Director Sonia Gaskell); expert leaper
- Anna Maria de Bruyn (1708–1744), stage actress, ballet dancer
- Polly Cuninghame (1785–1837), see France
- Anouk van Dijk (born 1965), dancer, choreographer, artistic director
- Sonia Gaskell (1904–1974), see Lithuania
- Chaja Goldstein (1908–1999), Jewish dancer and singer
- Martine van Hamel (born 1945), ballerina, director, teacher
- Mata Hari (1876–1917), exotic modern dancer in Paris, executed for spying
- Corrie Hartong (1906–1991), dancer, dance teacher, choreographer
- Penney de Jager (born 1948), ballet dancer, choreographer, founded the Holland Show Ballet
- Bettie de Jong (born 1933), ballet dancer, lead dancer with the Paul Taylor Dance Company
- Igone de Jongh (born 1979), former ballet dancer, principal dancer, Dutch National Ballet
- Susanna van Lee (c. 1630–1700), actress, ballet dancer, also performed in Sweden
- Alexandra Radius (born 1942), ballerina, Dutch National Ballet, American Ballet Theatre
- Natalie La Rose (born 1988), singer, dancer, active in the United States
- Didy Veldman (born 1967), ballet dancer, choreographer

=== Norway ===
- Kjersti Alveberg (born 1948), ballet dancer, show dancer, choreographer, director
- Mona Berntsen (born 1990), Norwegian-Moroccan dancer
- Anne Borg (1936–2016), ballet dancer, choreographer
- Belinda Braza (born 1981), singer, professional dancer, dance teacher
- Gyda Christensen (1872–1964), actress, dancer, choreographer, headed the National Theatre's ballet school
- Anne Borg (1912–2003), dancer, ballet teacher
- Greta Gynt (1916–2000), singer, dancer, actress
- Henriette Hansen (1814–1892), actress, opera singer, considered to be Norway's first native professional ballet dancer
- Signe Hofgaard (1901–1998), dancer, choreographer, organizational leader
- Lillebil Ibsen (1899–1989), ballet dancer, film actress, danced in Max Reinhardt's pantomime productions
- Inga Jacobi (1891–1937), German-born Norwegian ballet dancer, choreographer
- Jorunn Kirkenær (1926–2021), ballet dancer, choreographer
- Ellen Kjellberg (born 1948), ballet dancer, Norwegian National Opera and Ballet
- Gerd Kjølaas (1909–2000), ballet dancer, choreographer
- Gerd Larsen (1921–2001), ballerina, performed with England's Royal Ballet
- Indra Lorentzen (born 1956), ballet dancer, choreographer
- Ingrid Lorentzen (born 1972), ballerina, director, Norwegian National Ballet
- Henny Mürer (1925–1997), ballet dancer, choreographer, Norwegian National Opera and Ballet, headed National Ballet School
- Tone Nyhagen (1963–2015), world champion sport dancer
- Edith Roger (1922–2023), ballet dancer, modern dancer, choreographer, theatre director, Ny Norsk Ballett
- Alice Mürer Siem (1925–2002), ballet dancer, choreographer, danced in revues, operettas and classical ballet
- Klara Semb (1884–1970), Norwegian folk dancer, choreographer, teacher
- Helene Spilling (born 1996), dancer, television personality
- Elizabeth Svarstad (born 1977), baroque dancer, choreographer, dance historian
- Madame Stuart (fl 1772), possibly the first Norwegian ballerina, also acrobat, singer, actress, composer
- Marguerite Thoresen (1908–1967), international ballet dancer performing as Rita Tori
- Vera Zorina (1917–2003), ballerina, actress, choreographer
- Silje Aker Johnsen (active since 2013), singer, dancer

=== Poland ===
- Agata Błażowska (born 1978), ice dancer
- Joanna Budner (born 1988), ice dancer
- Agnieszka Domańska (born 1975), ice dancer
- Iwona Filipowicz (born 1976), ice dancer
- Halina Gordon-Półtorak (fl 1970s), ice dancer, referee, chair of the International Skating Union's technical committee for ice dancing
- Honorata Górna (born 1968), ice dancer, national champion
- Małgorzata Grajcar (fl 1988), ice dancer, national champion
- Gilda Gray (1901–1959), show dancer, known for the shimmy
- Loda Halama (1911–1996), prima ballerina, Grand Theatre, Warsaw, several Polish films
- Edyta Herbuś (born 1981), competition dancer
- Natalia Kaliszek (born 1996), ice dancer
- Alexandra Kauc (born 1980), ice dancer
- Marianna Malińska (1767–fl.1797), ballerina, first native ballerina in Poland
- Sylwia Nowak (born 1976), ice dancer, coach
- Justyna Plutowska (born 1991), ice dancer
- Kamila Przyk (fl 1997), ice dancer
- Marie Rambert (1888–1982), ballerina, teacher, Ballet Rambert
- Edyta Śliwińska (born 1981), ballroom dancer
- Natasza Urbańska (born 1977), actress, singer, ballroom dancer
- Jolanta Wesołowska (born 1958), ice dancer
- Teresa Weyna (born 1950), ice dancer

=== Portugal ===
- Vera Mantero (born 1966), dancer and choreographer

=== Romania ===
- Alina Cojocaru (born 1981), ballet dancer, former principal dancer, English National Ballet, formerly The Royal Ballet
- Luminița Dumitrescu (born 1941), ballet dancer, choreographer and ballet teacher
- Mijaela Tesleoanu (1942–2011), ballerina and ballet mistress
- Francesca Velicu,

=== Russia ===
- Elena Andreianova (1819–1857), prima ballerina, Bolshoi Ballet
- Marina Anissina (born 1975), French-Russian ice dancer
- Natalia Annenko (born 1964), ice dancer
- Marina Antipova (born 1992), ice dancer
- Ksenia Antonova (born 1990), ice dancer
- Altynai Asylmuratova (born 1961), prima ballerina, Mariinsky Ballet, worldwide guest appearances, director of Vaganova Academy
- Elena Batanova (born 1964), ice dancer
- Anastasia Belova (born 1981), ice dancer
- Natalia Bestemianova (born 1960), ice dancer
- Ekaterina Bobrova (born 1990), ice dancer
- Catherine Chislova (1846–1889), ballerina
- Liana Churilova (born 1991), ballroom dancer
- Alexandra Danilova (1903–1997), ballerina, teacher, Ballets Russes, emigrated to the United States
- Maria Danilova (1793–1810), ballet dancer from the St. Petersburg school, died when 17
- Ekaterina Davydova (born 1978), ice dancer
- Anna Demidova (born 1988), Russian-American ballroom dancer
- Katusha Demidova (fl 2009), professional World Ballroom Dance champion
- Oksana Domnina (born 1984), ice dancer
- Natalia Dubova (born 1948), ice dancer, coach
- Sofia Evdokimova (born 1996), ice dancer
- Sofia Fedorova (1879–1963), ballerina
- Elena Garanina (born 1956), ice dancer
- Tamara Geva (1907–1997), Russian-American actress, ballet dancer, choreographer
- Sofia Golovkina (1915–2004), ballerina, teacher, head of Bolshoi Ballet School
- Julia Golovina (born 1982), ice dancer
- Anastasia Gorshkova (born 1987), ice dancer
- Kristina Gorshkova (born 1989), ice dancer
- Nadezhda Gracheva (born 1969), see Kazakhstan
- Anastasia Grebenkina (born 1979), ice dancer
- Elena Grinenko (born 1976), ballroom dancer, now in the United States
- Irina Grishkova (born 1946), ice dancer
- Oksana Grishuk (born 1972), ice dancer
- Tatjana Gsovsky (1901–1993), German-Russian ballet dancer and choreographer
- Ekaterina Gvozdkova (born 1981), ice dancer, coach
- Elena Ilinykh (born 1994), ice dancer
- Avdotia Istomina (1799–1848), most celebrated 19th-century Imperial Russian ballerina
- Anna Johansson (1860–1917), ballerina with the St. Petersburg Imperial Ballet
- Katya Jones (born 1993), dancer and choreographer, now in the United Kingdom
- Vera Karalli (1889–1972), ballerina, Bolshoi Theatre, also film actress, ballet mistress Romanian Opera
- Tamara Karsavina (1885–1978), prima ballerina, teacher, Imperial Russian Ballet, Royal Ballet
- Maria Kochetkova (born 1984), freelance ballet dancer, principal dancer, formerly San Francisco Ballet and American Ballet Theatre
- Olga Khokhlova (1891–1955), ballet dancer, first wife of Pablo Picasso
- Mathilde Kschessinska (1872–1971), ballerina of Polish extraction, danced with Saint Petersburg's Mariinsky Ballet, later teacher in France
- Maria Nikolaevna Kuznetsova (1880–1966), prominent opera singer and dancer
- Ileana Leonidoff (1893–after 1966) founder of the ballet corp of the Royal Opera of Rome, Ballet Oficial de Bolivia, Guayaquil Ballet (Ecuador) and Trujillo Ballet Company (Peru).
- Lydia Lopokova (1892–1981), prima ballerina, Ballets Russes
- Svetlana Lunkina (born 1979), ballet dancer, principal dancer, National Ballet of Canada
- Yulia Makhalina (born 1968), principal dancer, Mariinsky Ballet
- Natalia Makarova (born 1940), prima ballerina, choreographer, Kirov Ballet
- Sulamith Messerer (1908–2004), ballerina, choreographer, ballet mistress, Bolshoi Theatre, helped establish Tokyo Ballet
- Bronislava Nijinska (1891–1972), prima ballerina, choreographer, teacher, Imperial Ballet, Ballets Russes
- Cleo Nordi (1898–1983), prima ballerina with Pavlova's troupe, choreographer, teacher in London
- Natalia Osipova (born 1986), ballet dancer, principal dancer, Royal Ballet, formerly Bolshoi Ballet and Mikhailovsky ballet
- Veronika Part (born 1978), former ballet dancer, principal dancer, American Ballet Theatre
- Daria Pavlenko (born 1978), prima ballerina, Mariinsky Ballet
- Anna Pavlova (1881–1931), prima ballerina, danced with the Imperial Russian Ballet and the Ballets Russes
- Maya Plisetskaya (1925–2015), prima ballerina, choreographer, teacher, danced with the Bolshoi
- Julia Powers (fl. 1991), Russian-American ballroom dancer
- Olga Preobrajenska (1871–1962), ballerina of the Russian Imperial Ballet
- Kristina Rihanoff (born 1977), professional ballroom dancer
- Jia Ruskaja (1902–1970), Russian dancer and choreographer who established a national dance school in Italy
- Polina Semionova (born 1985) ballet dancer, principal dancer, Berlin State Ballet and American Ballet Theatre
- Marina Semyonova (1908–2010), prima ballerina, teacher, danced with the Bolshoi
- Tatyana Shlykova (1773–1863), ballerina and opera singer
- Elena Smirnova (1888–1934), last prima ballerina with the Mariinsky Theatre in Imperial Russia
- Olga Smirnova (born 1991), recent leading roles with the Bolshoi
- Alina Somova (born 1985), prima ballerina, Mariinsky Ballet
- Raisa Struchkova (1925–2005), ballet dancer, teacher
- Elena Surgutskaya (born 1986), ballroom dancer, choreographer
- Thamara de Swirsky (1888–1961), dancer, known for dancing barefoot
- Viktoria Tereshkina (born 1983), prima ballerina, Mariinsky Ballet
- Avdotya Timofeyeva (born 1739, death unknown), early ballerina trained by Jean-Baptiste Landé
- Anna Tsygankova (born 1979), ballet dancer, principal dancer, Dutch National Ballet
- Galina Ulanova (1910–1998), prima ballerina, danced with the Mariinsky Ballet and the Bolshoi
- Agrippina Vaganova (1879–1951), ballerina, ballet teacher, developed the Vaganova method
- Ekaterina Vaganova (born 1988), champion ballroom and Latin American dancer
- Stella Voskovetskaya (born 1965), ballerina, teacher, emigrated to the US
- Lyubov Yegorova (1880–1972), ballerina, ballet teacher
- Yulia Zagoruychenko (born 1981), Latin American dance champion

=== Serbia ===
- Irma de Malkhazouny, ballet dancer

=== Slovenia ===
- Stanislava Brezovar (1937–2003), ballerina, starred in the film Ples čarovnic (Dance of the Witches)
- Meta Vidmar (1899–1975), modern dancer, expressionist dancer, teacher

=== Spain ===
- Antonia Santiago Amador (born 1946; La Chana), flamenco dancer
- Alicia Amatriain, ballet dancer, principal dancer, Stuttgart Ballet
- Dores André, ballet dancer, principal dancer, San Francisco Ballet
- La Argentinita (1898–1945), ballet dancer, costume designer
- Elisa Badenes, ballet dancer, principal dancer, Stuttgart Ballet
- Sara Baras (born 1971), flamenco dancer
- Carmencita (1868–1910), Spanish show dancer, American music-hall ballet dancer
- La Chunga (1938–2025), flamenco dancer
- Luz Chavita (1880–?), music hall ballet dancer in Paris
- Dalilah (1936–2001), flamenco dancer, oriental dancer
- Adelita Domingo (1930–2012), dancer, songwriter, concert pianist, teacher of dance and tonadilla songs
- Lola Flores (1923–1995), flamenco dancer, actress
- Cristina Hoyos (born 1946), flamenco dancer, choreographer, film actress
- María Juncal (born ca. 1981), flamenco dancer
- Lucia Lacarra (born 1975), ballet dancer, former principal with Bayerisches Staatsballett
- Blanca Li (born 1964), ballet dancer, flamenco dancer, choreographer
- Pilar López Júlvez (1912–2008), show dancer, choreographer, also performed in Latin America and United States
- Sara Luzita (1922–2025), ballerina, Spanish dancer, Ballet Rambert
- Juana la Macarrona (1860–1947), flamenco dancer, danced in Paris and elsewhere in Europe
- Rosita Mauri (1850–1923), prima ballerina, Paris Opera Ballet
- Itziar Mendizabal (born 1981), ballet dancer, first soloist, The Royal Ballet
- Merche Esmeralda (born 1947/50), flamenco dancer and choreographer
- Laura Morera (born c. 1981), former principal dancer, The Royal Ballet
- Arantxa Ochoa (born 1974), principal dancer, Pennsylvania Ballet
- La Belle Otero (1868–1965), show dancer, star of the Folies Bergère
- María Pagés (born 1963), flamenco dancer, choreographer, touring internationally with her Maria Pagès Company
- Blanca del Rey (born 1946), flamenco dancer and choreographer
- Custodia Romero (1905–1974), flamenco dancer and actress
- Rosita Rodrigo (1891–1959), actress, vedette, dancer, and songwriter
- Tamara Rojo (born 1974), principal dancer, director, English National Ballet, formerly The Royal Ballet
- Laura del Sol (born 1961), flamenco dancer, film actress, starred in the 1983 film Carmen
- Carmen Tórtola Valencia (1882–1955), show dancer, choreographer, costume designer, Folies Bergère
- Katita Waldo (born 1968), ballet dancer, former principal and ballet master, San Francisco Ballet
- Nadia Yanowsky, dancer, Royal New Zealand Ballet
- Zenaida Yanowsky (born 1975), former ballet dancer, principal dancer, Royal Ballet
- Angelita Vargas (born 1946), flamenco dancer
- Eva la Yerbabuena (born 1970), flamenco dancer
- Isabella Cubas (1831–1864), dancer and actress

=== Sweden ===
- Ulrika Åberg (1771–1852), one of the first native Swedes in the Royal Swedish Ballet
- Birgit Åkesson (1908–2001), choreographer, dancer, dance researcher
- Anneli Alhanko (born 1953 in Colombia), ballerina, has danced in several films
- Aino Bergö (1915–1944), ballerina, opera singer
- Jenny Brandt (1867–1933), ballerina
- Cristina Caprioli (born 1953), choreographer
- Dee Demirbag (born 1973), Turkish-born dancer and singer
- Isabel Edvardsson (born 1982), dancer
- Cecilia Ehrling (born 1984), competitive dancer
- Jeanna Falk (1901–1980), dancer, dance teacher
- Nikisha Fogo, ballet dancer, principal dancer, San Francisco Ballet, former principal dancer Vienna State Ballet
- Amanda Forsberg (born 1846), ballerina
- Sophie Hagman (1758–1826), ballet dancer
- Jenny Hasselquist (1894–1978), prima ballerina, Royal Ballet, acted in many silent films
- Hedda Hjortsberg (1777–1867), prima ballerina, Royal Swedish Ballet
- Anna Sophia Holmstedt (1759–1807), pioneering ballet dancer
- Sofia Karlsson (born 1978), modern dancer
- Sophie Karsten (1783–1862), prima ballerina, Royal Swedish Ballet, mother of Marie Taglioni
- Ana Laguna (born 1955), internationally known Spanish-born Swedish ballet dancer, teacher
- Efva Lilja (born 1956), choreographer
- Marie Lindqvist (born 1970), principal dancer, teacher, Royal Swedish Ballet
- Gun Lund (born 1943), choreographer, dance company director
- Hilda Lund (1840–1911), prima ballerina, teacher, Royal Swedish Ballet
- Sonja Lund (born 1942), dancer, actress
- Jenny Nilson (born 1973), principal dancer, Royal Swedish Ballet
- Charlotta Norberg (1824–1892), prima ballerina, teacher, student of August Bournonville, Royal Swedish Ballet
- Nathalie Nordquist (born 1979), principal, Royal Swedish Ballet
- Linda Pritchard (born 1983), singer, professional dancer
- Gunhild Rosén (1855–1928), prima ballerina, choreographer, ballet master, Royal Swedish Ballet
- Elsa-Marianne von Rosen (1924–2014), ballet dancer, choreographer, actress
- Olga Sandberg (1844–1926), ballerina
- Nadja Sellrup (born 1977), principal dancer, Royal Swedish Ballet
- Charlotte Slottsberg (1760–1800), prima ballerina, Royal Swedish Ballet, danced with Antoine Bournonville
- Carin da Silva (born 1984), singer, professional dancer
- Lisa Steier (1888–1928), prima ballerina, teacher, ballet master, Royal Swedish Ballet
- Kari Sylwan (born 1940), actress, dancer, ballet teacher, choreographer
- Marie Taglioni (1804–1884), prima ballerina, Paris Opera, Imperial Ballet, first to dance en pointe
- Anna Valev (born 1969), principal dancer, Royal Swedish Ballet
- Maria Westberg (1853–1893), ballerina
- Jennie Widegren (born 1973), dancer, choreographer

=== Switzerland ===
- Manola Asensio (born 1943), ballet dancer
- Christine Brodbeck (born 1950), dancer
- Beatriz Consuelo (1932–2013), ballet dancer
- Nina Corti (born 1953), flamenco dancer
- Aenne Goldschmidt (1920–2020), expressionist dancer, choreographer, pedagogue
- Ursula Kübler (1928–2010), ballet dancer with Paris Opera Ballet
- Asa Lanova (1933–2017), ballet dancer
- Fabienne Liechti, professional ballroom dancer
- Julia Marcus (1905–2002), dancer, choreographer
- Suzanne Perrottet (1889–1983), dancer, movement teacher
- Norka Rouskaya, eccentric dancer

=== Ukraine ===
- Irina Dvorovenko, former ballet dancer and actress, principal dancer, American Ballet Theatre
- Masha Dashkina Maddux, modern dancer, former principal dancer with Martha Graham Dance Company
- Iana Salenko (born 1983), ballet dancer, principal dancer, Berlin State Ballet
- Christine Shevchenko (born 1988), ballet dancer, principal dancer, American Ballet Theatre
- Karina Smirnoff (born 1978), ballroom dancer, now in the United States

=== United Kingdom ===
- Louise Henderson (burlesque) (dates unknown)
- Phyllis Bedells (1893–1985), first British prima ballerina, teacher, London Empire Theatre, Covent Garden, also in musicals
- Immodesty Blaize (born c. 1978), burlesque dancer, show girl
- Teneisha Bonner (1981–2019), hip hop and street dancer
- Deborah Bull (born 1963), ballet dancer, broadcaster
- Darcey Bussell (born 1969), former ballet dancer and TV presenter, principal dancer, Royal Ballet
- Claire Calvert (born 1988), ballet dancer, first soloist, Royal Ballet
- Simone Clarke (born 1970), prima ballerina, English National Ballet
- Lesley Collier (born 1947), principal dancer, teacher, Royal Ballet
- Lauren Cuthbertson (born 1984), ballet dancer, principal dancer, Royal Ballet
- Hermione Darnborough (1915–2010), ballerina, Saddler's Wells
- Nancy Dawson (c.1728–1767), actress and dancer, famous for her hornpipe
- Viviana Durante (born 1967), see Italy
- Julia Farron (1922–2019), principal dancer, teacher, Royal Ballet
- Margot Fonteyn (1919–1991), prima ballerina assoulta with The Royal Ballet, frequently performed with Rudolf Nureyev
- Celia Franca (1921–2007), founder, director, National Ballet of Canada
- Maina Gielgud (born 1945), ballerina, artistic director, Australian Ballet
- Beryl Goldwyn (1930–2022), prima ballerina, Ballet Rambert, The Royal Ballet
- Beryl Grey (1927–2022), outstanding prima ballerina, Saddlers Wells Ballet/Royal Ballet, first western dancer to perform at the Bolshoi
- Melissa Hamilton (born 1989), ballet dancer, principal dancer, Royal Ballet, former principal dancer, Semperoper Ballett
- Ruthie Henshall (born 1967), singer, dancer, actress, in West End musicals
- Lydia Cecilia Hill (1913–1940), cabaret dancer
- Francesca Hayward (born 1992), ballet dancer, principal dancer, Royal Ballet
- Paula Hinton (1924–1996), ballet dancer, wife and partner of Walter Gore
- Seeta Indrani (born 1963), theatre dancer, musicals
- Jillian La Valette (born 1934), ballroom dancer, teacher
- Stephanie Lawrence (1949–2000), singer, dancer, in West End musicals
- Perri Lister (born 1959), dancer, actress, Hot Gossip
- Mabel Love (1874–1953), burlesque dancer, singer, actress
- Gillian Lynne (1926–2018), ballerina, director, choreographer of West End musicals
- Alicia Markova (1910–2004), ballerina, choreographer, teacher, performed with the Ballets Russes and the English National Ballet
- Cathy Marston (born 1975), ballet dancer, choreographer
- Kizzy Matiakis (born 1981), baller dancer, principal dancer, Royal Danish Ballet
- Jessie Matthews (1907–1981), dancer, actress, appeared in early musicals
- Pippa Moore, ballet dancer, former premier dancer, Northern Ballet
- Yasmine Naghdi, ballet dancer, principal dancer, Royal Ballet
- Caroline O'Connor (born 1962), singer, dancer, actress, in West End musicals
- Betty Oliphant (1918–2004), ballet mistress, teacher, National Ballet of Canada
- Nancy Osbaldeston (born 1989), ballet dancer, principal dancer, Royal Ballet of Flanders
- Georgina Parkinson (1938–2009), ballet dancer, principal dancer, Royal Ballet, ballet mistress, American Ballet Theatre
- Arlene Phillips (born 1943), choreographer, West End and Broadway musicals
- Florence Pigott (died 1899), ballerina, Metropolitan Opera Company
- Marguerite Porter (born 1948), principal ballerina, choreographer, teacher, Royal Ballet
- Samantha Raine, ballet mistress and former ballet dancer, Royal Ballet
- Sophie Rebecca, ballet dancer
- Hollie Robertson (born 1985), ballroom dancer
- Anne Rogers (born 1933), actress, dancer, singer, in West End and Broadway musicals
- Gaynor Rowlands (1883–1906), ballet dancer, show dancer, actress
- Hester Santlow (c. 1690–1773), early stage dancer, actress, Drury Lane
- Valda Setterfield (born 1934), stage dancer, actress
- Antoinette Sibley (born 1939), prima ballerina, teacher, Royal Ballet
- Emma Slater (born 1988), professional dancer, choreographer
- Phyllida Crowley Smith, theatre dancer, choreographer, musicals
- Lydia Sokolova (1896–1974), ballerina, choreographer, Ballets Russes
- Peggy Spencer (1920–2016), ballroom dancer, choreographer
- Penelope Spencer (1901–1993), innovative free-style dancer and choreographer
- Laurretta Summerscales, ballet dancer, principal dancer, Bavarian State Ballet
- Lydia Thompson (1838–1908), stage dancer, burlesque actress, travelled widely across Europe and the United States
- Tracey Ullman (born 1959), actress, singer, dancer, comedian
- Anne Woolliams (1926–1999), artistic director, ballet choreographer, dancer and teacher
- Doreen Wells (born 1937), ballerina, theatre dancer
- Beryl de Zoete (1879–1962), ballet dancer, critic, researcher

== North America ==
=== Canada ===
- Miriam Adams (born 1944), dancer, choreographer, archivist
- Jennifer Alexander (1972–2007), ballet dancer
- Maud Allan (1873–1956), dancer, choreographer, famous for her Salomé dance and her Dance of the Seven Veils
- Aszure Barton, choreographer
- Anik Bissonnette (born 1962), ballet dancer
- Barbara Bourget (active from 1969), ballet dance, artistic director
- Sally Brayley (born 1937), Canadian-American ballet dancer, coach
- Ludmilla Chiriaeff (1924–1996), Soviet-born Canadian ballet dancer, choreographer, teacher
- Alexandra Denisova (born c.1922), ballet dancer
- Frances Chung, ballet dancer, principal dancer, San Francisco Ballet
- Crystal Costa, ballet dancer, principal dancer, Hong Kong Ballet, first soloist English National Ballet
- Anne Ditchburn (born 1949), ballet dancer, choreographer, actress
- Celia Franca (1921–2007), founder of the National Ballet of Canada
- Gail Gilmore (1937–2014), ballet dancer, actress
- Chan-hon Goh (born 1969), Chinese-Canadian ballet dancer
- Christa-Elizabeth Goulakos (born 1988), ice dancer
- Geneviève Guérard (born 1973), ballet dancer, television host
- Evelyn Hart (born 1956), ballet dancer
- Vanessa Harwood (born 1947), ballet dancer, choreographer, teacher
- Melissa Hayden (1923–2006), prima ballerina, New York City Ballet
- Greta Hodgkinson (born 1974), ballet dancer, former principal dancer, National Ballet of Canada
- Anna Istomina (1925–2014), ballet dancer, soloist, Ballet Russe de Monte Carlo
- Karen Kain (born 1951), ballet dancer, artistic director
- Louise Lecavalier (born 1958), modern dancer, several films
- Ruta Lee (born 1936), actress, dancer, appeared in Seven Brides for Seven Brothers
- Angela Leigh (died 2004), Ugandan-born ballerina, teacher
- Elena Lobsanova, ballet dancer, principal dancer, Miami City Ballet, formerly National Ballet of Canada
- Sabrina Matthews (born 1977), choreographer
- Rachael McLaren, dancer, Alvin Ailey American Dance Theater
- Emily Molnar (active from 2009), ballet dancer
- Hope Muir, dancer, artistic director designate, National Ballet of Canada, artistic director, Charlotte Ballet
- Betty Oliphant (1918–2004), co-founder of the National Ballet School of Canada
- Simone Orlando (active from 1989), ballet dancer, choreographer
- Jennifer Penney (born 1946), ballet dancer
- Crystal Pite (born 1970), ballet dancer, choreographer
- Sonia Rodriguez (born 1972), ballet dancer, principal dancer, National Ballet of Canada
- Geneviève Salbaing (1922–2016), ballet dancer, choreographer, artistic director
- Lynn Seymour (1939–2023), ballet dancer
- Lois Smith (1929–2011), ballet dancer, teacher
- Mavis Staines (born 1954), ballet dancer, teacher
- Iro Tembeck (1946–2004), ballet dancer, choreographer, dance historian
- Veronica Tennant (born 1946), ballet dancer, filmmaker
- Eva Von Gencsy (1924–2013), ballet dancer, choreographer, teacher
- Jennifer Welsman (active from 1993), ballet dancer

=== Cuba ===
- Alicia Alonso (1920–2019), prima ballerina assoluta, choreographer, former prima ballerina at New York's American Ballet Theatre, founder and ex-director of the Cuban National Ballet
- Loipa Araújo (born 1941), prima ballerina and ballet mistress at the Cuban National Ballet; Associate Artistic Director of the English National Ballet; one of the "four jewels of Cuban ballet"
- Sadaise Arencibia, star dancer at the Cuban National Ballet since 2009
- Aurora Bosch (born 1942), prima ballerina and ballet mistress at the Cuban National Ballet; one of the "four jewels of Cuban ballet"
- Lorena Feijóo, ballet dancer, former principal dancer, San Francisco Ballet
- Lorna Feijóo, ballet dancer, former principal dancer, Boston Ballet
- Alicia Parla (1914–1998), rhumba dancer
- Josefina Méndez (1941–2007), prima ballerina and ballet mistress at the Cuban National Ballet; one of the "four jewels of Cuban ballet"; professor of ballet at National Art Schools (Cuba)
- Mirta Plá (1940–2003), prima ballerina of the Cuban National Ballet; one of the "four jewels of Cuban ballet"
- Mijaela Tesleoanu (1942–2011), see Romania

=== Mexico ===
- Elisa Carrillo Cabrera (born 1981), ballet dancer, principal dancer, Berlin State Ballet
- Gloria Mestre (1928–2012), Prima ballerina assoluta at Teatro di San Carlo in Naples
- Pilar Rioja (born 1932), dancer
- Maclovia Ruiz (1910–2005), ballet dancer, show dancer, flamenco dancer, performed with San Francisco Ballet
- Brenda Velez (born 1979), ballet dancer known for performing Giselle at Teatro Degollado and owning VIA DANZA
- Lola Yberri (fl 1905), vaudeville dancer

=== United States ===
- Stella Abrera, ballet dancer, former principal dancer, American Ballet Theatre
- Mary Ann Wells (1894–1971), American dance teacher
- Precious Adams, ballet dancer, English National Ballet
- Edith Allard (1927–2012), ballerina, soloist in Europe
- Gladys Bailin (born 1930), dancer and choreographer, Henry Street Playhouse
- Louise Alexander, Apache dancer, temptress dancer, social exhibition dancer
- Heléne Alexopoulos, ballet dancer, principal dancer, New York City Ballet
- Lauren Anderson (born 1965), African American ballerina, Houston Ballet
- Alexandra Ansanelli (born 1980), principal dancer, New York City Ballet, Royal Ballet
- Aesha Ash (born 1977), ballet dancer
- Merrill Ashley (born 1950), ballet dancer, principal dancer, New York City Ballet
- Debra Austin (born 1955), principal dancer, Pennsylvania Ballet
- Caroline Baldwin (born 1990), ballet dancer, principal dancer, Royal Danish Ballet
- Melissa Barak (born 1979), ballerina, choreographer, Los Angeles Ballet
- Shura Baryshnikov (born 1981), dancer, choreographer, educator
- Barbara Bears (born 1971), principal dancer, choreographer, Houston Ballet
- Margery Beddow (1931–2010), dancer, choreographer, Broadway musicals
- Stella Bloch (1897–1999), artist, dancer, journalist
- Bella Blue (born 1982), burlesque dancer
- Olivia Boisson, ballet dancer, New York City Ballet
- Chrystelle Trump Bond, American dancer, choreographer, and dance historian
- Ashley Bouder (born 1983), ballet dancer, principal dancer, New York City Ballet
- Anise Boyer (1914–2008), Cotton Club chorine, traveled with Cab Calloway's band
- Isabella Boylston (born c. 1986), ballet dancer, principal dancer, American Ballet Theatre
- Skylar Brandt (born 1993), ballet dancer, principal dancer, American Ballet Theatre
- Rachel Brice (born 1972), belly dancer
- Danielle Brown (born late 1980s), principal dancer, Sarasota Ballet
- Tener Brown (born 1960), ballet dancer, teacher, New Jersey Ballet
- Harriet Browne (1932–1997), tap dancer, choreographer
- Leslie Browne (born 1957), dancer, actress, musicals
- Jean Butler (born 1971), show dancer, choreographer, created female role in the Irish Riverdance
- Maria Calegari (born 1957), ballet dancer, principal dancer, New York City Ballet
- Lucia Chase (1897–1986), dancer, actress, co-founder of American Ballet Theatre
- Yvonne Chouteau (1929–2016), dancer, Ballet Russe de Monte Carlo, co-founder of University of Oklahoma School of Dance
- Lia Cirio, dancer, principal dancer, Boston Ballet
- Natalia Clare (1919–1995), dancer with Ballet Russe de Monte Carlo, founder of Ballet la Jeunesse
- Bessie Clayton (c. 1875–1948), show dancer, choreographer of the Gay Nineties
- Janet Collins (1917–2003), Broadway ballet dancer, choreographer, teacher
- Kathleen Breen Combes, ballet dancer, principal dancer with Boston Ballet
- Misty Copeland (born 1982), ballet dancer, soloist with the American Ballet Theatre
- Lillian Covillo (1921–2010), ballet dancer, co-founder of the Colorado Ballet
- J'aime Crandall (born 1982), ballet dancer, principal dancer, Royal Danish Ballet
- Alexandra Danilova (1903–1997), see Russian female dancers
- Mary Day (1910–2006), ballet teacher
- Gemze de Lappe (1922–2017), dancer, choreographer, teacher, musicals
- Carmen De Lavallade (1931–2025), dancer, choreographer, actress
- Agnes de Mille (1905–1993), ballet dancer, contemporary dancer, choreographer, musicals
- Patricia Delgado, ballet dancer, répétiteur, teacher, former principal dancer, Miami City Ballet
- Michaela DePrince (1995–2024), second soloist ballet dancer for the Boston Ballet, former soloist Dutch National Ballet
- Marguerite Derricks (born 1961), ballerina, choreographer, musicals
- Sasha De Sola, ballet dancer, principal dancer, San Francisco Ballet
- Jeanne Devereaux (1912–2011), prima ballerina, choreographer
- Julie Diana, ballet dancer, writer and arts administrator, former principal dancer, San Francisco Ballet and Pennsylvania Ballet, executive director, American Repertory Ballet
- Holly Dorger, ballet dancer, principal dancer, Royal Danish Ballet
- Isadora Duncan (1877–1927), innovative dancer preferring natural movement to ballet, opened dance school in Grunewald, Germany
- Katherine Dunham (1909–2006), dancer, choreographer, author, educator and social activist.
- Ashley Ellis, ballet dancer, principal dancer, Boston Ballet
- Eva Evdokimova (1948–2009), ballerina, teacher, active in the Royal Danish Ballet and the Berlin State Ballet
- Suzanne Farrell (born 1945), ballet dancer, founder of Suzanne Farrell Ballet
- Chyrstyn Fentroy, ballet dancer, second soloist with Boston Ballet
- Kelli Finglass (born 1964), dancer, director
- Katherine Flowers (1896–1982), African-American dancer, choreographer, teacher and researcher
- Amy Fote (born 1972), principal dancer, Houston Ballet
- Loie Fuller (1862–1928), pioneer of modern dance, own natural movement and improvisation techniques, also choreographer, Folies Bergère
- Annabelle Gamson (1928–2023), modern dancer, Broadway musicals
- Robin Gee, dancer, educator, choreographer
- Angelica Generosa, ballet dancer, principal dancer, Pacific Northwest Ballet
- Alicia Graf Mack, dancer and teacher, director of dance division, Juilliard School
- Martha Graham (1894–1991), modern dancer, choreographer, pioneer of modern dance, Folies Bergère
- Jill Green, dance scholar, educator
- Cynthia Gregory (born 1946), prima ballerina, American Ballet Theatre
- Francesca Harper (born 1969), dancer and choreographer, founder of The Francesca Harper Project
- Mireille Hassenboehler (born c. 1973), principal dancer, Houston Ballet
- Sarah Hay (born 1987), ballet dancer and actress
- Susan Hendl (1947–2020), ballet dancer and répétiteur, New York City Ballet
- Rosella Hightower (1920–2008), ballet dancer, Grand Ballet de Monte Carlo, directed several French ballet companies
- Harriet Hoctor (1905–1977), ballerina, teacher, actress, Hollywood movies
- Ana Paula Höfling, dancer, dance scholar, capoeirista
- Melissa Hough, ballet dancer, principal dancer, Norwegian National Ballet, previously Boston Ballet and Houston Ballet
- Catherine Hurlin, American ballet dancer, soloist, American Ballet Theatre
- Doris Humphrey (1895–1958), influential modern dancer, choreographer, teacher
- Sterling Hyltin (born 1985), ballet dancer, principal dancer, New York City Ballet
- Carrie Imler, ballet dancer, former principal dancer, Pacific Northwest Ballet
- Janet Jackson (born 1966), singer, show dancer, rock, hip hop
- Drew Jacoby (born 1984), contemporary ballet dancer, principal dancer, Royal Ballet of Flanders
- Susan Jaffe (born 1962), ballerina, ballet mistress, American Ballet Theatre
- Whitney Jensen (born 1992), ballet dancer, Norwegian National Ballet, formerly Boston Ballet
- Emily Johnson (born 1976), Native American modern dancer, choreographer, artistic director
- Allegra Kent (born 1937), ballet dancer, actress, New York City Ballet
- Julie Kent (born 1969), ballet dancer and director, former principal dancer, American Ballet Theatre, artistic director, The Washington Ballet
- Gelsey Kirkland (born 1952), principal dancer, New York City Ballet
- Darci Kistler (born 1964), principal dancer, New York City Ballet
- Maria Kowroski (born 1976), ballet dancer, principal dancer, New York City Ballet
- Rebecca Krohn, former ballet dancer, ballet master and former principal dancer, New York City Ballet
- Sarah Lamb (born 1980), ballet dancer, principal dancer, The Royal Ballet
- Katherine LaNasa (born 1966), film actress, ballet dancer, choreographer
- Sarah Lane (born 1984), ballet dancer, former principal dancer, American Ballet Theatre
- Moscelyne Larkin (1925–2012), ballet dancer, founder of the Tulsa Ballet
- Tina LeBlanc (born 1966), ballet dancer, teacher and ballet master, former principal dancer, San Francisco Ballet
- Emery LeCrone, dancer, choreographer
- Megan LeCrone, ballet dancer, soloist with New York City Ballet
- Sara Leland (1941–2020), ballet dancer, principal and assistant balletmaster, New York City Ballet
- Kylie Shea Lewallen (born 1986), ballet dancer, former principal dancer with Spectrum Dance Theater
- Janet Lilly, modern dancer, choreographer, former principal dancer of Bill T. Jones/Arnie Zane Dance Company
- Jennifer Lopez (born 1969), film actress, show dancer, choreographer, Latin dance
- Lauren Lovette (born 1993), ballet dancer, choreographer, principal dancer, New York City Ballet
- Annabelle Lyon (1916–2011), ballet dancer, American Ballet
- Kathi Martuza (born c. 1979), principal dancer, Oregon Ballet Theatre
- Maryhelen Mayfield (1946—2024), ballet dancer, Kansas City Ballet
- Kay Mazzo (born 1946), ballet dancer and educator, principal dancer, New York City Ballet, Chairman of Faculty, School of American Ballet
- Patricia McBride (born 1942), principal dancer, New York City Ballet
- Joan McCracken (1917–1961), actress, dancer, comedian in Broadway shows
- Sara Mearns (born 1983), ballet dancer, principal dancer, New York City Ballet
- Melody Mennite (born c. 1983), principal dancer, Houston Ballet
- Chloe Misseldine, principal dancer, American Ballet Theatre
- Beth Mitchell (1972–1998), shag dancer
- Merritt Moore (born 1988), ballet dancer, quantum physicist, completing residency at Harvard University's ArtLab
- Kathryn Morgan (born 1989), ballet dancer, former soloist with New York City Ballet
- Mary Ellen Moylan (1925–2020), ballet dancer, Ballet Russe de Monte Carlo, Ballet Society, Ballet Theatre and Metropolitan Opera Ballet
- Gillian Murphy (born 1979), ballet dancer, principal dancer, American Ballet Theatre
- Patricia Neary (born 1942), international prima ballerina, choreographer, ballet director, specializing in the ballets of George Balanchine
- Kyra Nichols (born 1958), ballet dancer and teacher, former principal dancer, New York City Ballet
- Georgina Pazcoguin, ballet dancer and actress, soloist, New York City Ballet
- Noelani Pantastico (born 1980), ballet dancer, principal dancer, Pacific Northwest Ballet, formerly Les Ballets de Monte Carlo
- Tiler Peck (born 1989), ballet dancer, principal dancer, New York City Ballet
- Unity Phelan, ballet dancer, soloist, New York City Ballet
- Valarie Pettiford, Fosse
- Juanita Pitts, tap dancer
- Eleanor Powell (1912–1982), dancer and actress
- Pearl Primus (1919–1994), dancer, choreographer and anthropologist, pioneer of African dance in the US
- Katy Pyle, ballet dancer, director, founder of Ballez
- Teresa Reichlen, ballet dancer, principal dancer, New York City Ballet
- Jenifer Ringer, ballet dancer and teacher, former principal dancer, New York City Ballet, Dean of Colburn School's Trudl Zipper Dance Institute.
- Carmencita Romero (1914–2001), dancer, choreographer, and dance teacher
- Alison Roper (born 1974), principal dancer, Oregon Ballet Theatre
- Ruth St. Denis (1879–1968), pioneer of modern dance, Oriental dance as an expression of spiritualism
- Stephanie Saland, former ballet dancer and teacher, principal dancer, New York City Ballet
- Amanda Schull (born 1978), former ballet dancer and actress, San Francisco Ballet
- Terry Sendgraff, dancer, choreographer
- Rosy Simas (Seneca Nation of Indians) (born 1967), Native American choreographer, dancer
- Karina Smirnoff (born 1978), see Ukraine
- Molly Smolen, principal dancer with Birmingham Royal Ballet since 1999
- Jennie Somogyi, ballet dancer, former principal dancer, New York City Ballet
- Abi Stafford, ballet dancer, principal dancer, New York City Ballet
- Llanchie Stevenson, ballet dancer
- Beatriz Stix-Brunell (born 1993), ballet dancer, first soloist, Royal Ballet
- B.J. Sullivan, dancer, choreographer, educator
- Maria Tallchief (1925–2013), Native American prima ballerina with George Balanchine at New York City Ballet
- Marjorie Tallchief (1926–2021), first American to be "première danseuse étoile" at the Paris Opera Ballet
- Helen Tamiris (1905–1966), pioneer of modern dance, contributing to the choreography of early musicals
- Janie Taylor, ballet dancer, L.A. Dance Project, former principal dancer, New York City Ballet
- Devon Teuscher (born 1989), ballet dancer, principal dancer, American Ballet Theatre
- Twyla Tharp (born 1942), dancer, choreographer
- Justin Tornow, dancer, choreographer, educator
- Judy Trammell (born 1958), dancer, choreographer
- Cassandra Trenary, ballet dancer, principal dancer, American Ballet Theatre
- Tracey Ullman (born 1959), actress, singer, dancer, comedian
- Jan Van Dyke (1941–2015), dancer, choreographer, educator
- Sarah Van Patten (born 1984), ballet dancer, principal dancer, San Francisco Ballet
- Lea Ved (born 1991), contemporary dancer, soloist, Royal Swedish Ballet and Nederlands Dans Theater
- Laura Vikmanis (born 1968), dancer
- Jocelyn Vollmar (1925–2018), ballet dancer, San Francisco Ballet, principal with New York City Ballet
- Dita Von Teese (born 1972), burlesque dancer
- Sydney Magruder Washington, ballet dancer
- Alexandra Waterbury, ballet dancer, former student at the School of American Ballet
- Amy Watson (born 1981), principal dancer, Royal Danish Ballet
- Heather Watts (born 1953), principal dancer, New York City Ballet
- Sara Webb (born 1979), principal dancer, Houston Ballet
- Miranda Weese, ballet dancer, former principal dancer, New York City Ballet and Pacific Northwest Ballet
- Wendy Whelan (born 1967), ballet dancer, associate artistic director and former principal dancer, New York City Ballet
- Michele Wiles (born c. 1980), principal dancer, American Ballet Theatre
- Sallie Wilson (1932–2008), ballet dancer, American Ballet Theatre, ballet mistress New York Theatre Ballet
- Serena Wilson (1933–2007), belly dancer, teacher
- Ann Woodward (1915–1975), showgirl
- Vanessa Zahorian, former ballet dancer, principal dancer, San Francisco Ballet
- Lila Zali (1918–2003), see Georgia
- Bridgett Zehr (born c. 1985), principal dancer, National Ballet of Canada, English National Ballet
- Maddie Ziegler (born 2002), internet celebrity and Dance Moms cast member
- Mackenzie Ziegler (born 2004), social media influencer, Dance Moms cast member, The Masked Dancer contestant

==== Puerto Rico ====
- Lourdes Chacón (born 1950), exotic dancer, singer
- Rita Moreno (born 1931), actress, dancer, singer

== South America ==
=== Argentina ===
- Esmeralda Agoglia (1923–2014), prima ballerina, choreographer, director, Teatro Colón
- Carolina Agüero (born 1975), ballet dancer
- Susana Agüero (1944–2012), ballerina, Teatro Colón, Lyon Opera Ballet
- Valeria Archimó (born 1972), show dancer, choreographer, director
- La Argentina (1890–1936), show dancer, gypsy-style dancer, Moulin Rouge
- Hortensia Arnaud (1901–?), dancer, vedette, and actress
- Carmencita Calderón (1905–2005), tango dancer
- Eleonora Cassano (born 1965), ballerina, modern dancer, Teatro Colón, musicals
- Erica Cornejo, ballet dancer, former principal dancer, Boston Ballet
- Olga Ferri (1928–2012), ballerina, Teatro Colón
- Norma Fontenla (1930–1971), prima ballerina, Teatro Colón, died in plane crash
- Adabel Guerrero (born 1978), ballet dancer, show dancer, actress
- Paloma Herrera (born 1975), former ballet dancer, principal dancer, American Ballet Theatre
- Natalia Magnicaballi, principal dancer since 1999, Suzanne Farrell Ballet
- Lida Martinoli (1914–1991), ballet dancer, choreographer, actress, Teatro Colón
- Tita Merello (1904–2002), tango dancer, film actress
- Mariana Montes (born 1979), Argentine tango dancer, teacher
- María Nieves (1938–2026), Argentine tango dancer
- Marianela Núñez (born 1982), ballet dancer, principal dancer, The Royal Ballet
- Ludmila Pagliero (born 1983), ballet dancer, étoile with the Paris Opera Ballet
- María Ruanova (1912–1976), prima ballerina, choreographer, teacher, Teatro Colón, first Argentine ballet dancer to gain international recognition

=== Brazil ===
- Mercedes Baptista (1921–2014), ballet dancer, choreographer
- Adriana Bombom (born 1974), show dancer, actress
- Sonia Destre Lie, dancer, choreographer, founder and director of the hip hop group Companhia Urbana de Dança
- Marcia Haydée (born 1937), prima ballerina, director, Stuttgart Ballet, Santiago Ballet
- Carla Körbes (born c. 1981), former ballet dancer, principal dancer, Pacific Northwest Ballet
- Mayara Magri, ballet dancer, principal dancer, Royal Ballet
- Roberta Marquez (born 1977), former ballet dancer, principal dancer, Royal Ballet
- Tuany Nascimento, ballet dancer, dance teacher
- Fernanda Oliveira (born 1980), baller dancer, lead principal, English National Ballet
- Ingrid Silva, ballet dancer, Dance Theatre of Harlem
- Julia Goldani Telles (born 1995), ballerina, actress, now in the United States

=== Chile ===
- Yamna Lobos (born 1983), Chilean folk dancer, actress

=== Colombia ===
- Sonia Osorio (1928–2011), ballerina and choreographer

=== Peru ===
- Tati Alcántara, actress, dancer, choreographer, musicals
- Helba Huara, (1900–1986) dancer, choreographer

=== Uruguay ===
- Eunice Castro (born 1976), model and theatre dancer
- Virginia Dobrich (born 1983), dancer, actress and model
- Tina Ferreira, Afro-Uruguayan, dancer, journalist and vedette of both theater and carnival
- Graciela Figueroa, dancer and choreographer
- Laura Martínez (born 1964), actress, dancer and television star
- Berta Pereira (born 1958), percussionist and dancer
- Maria Riccetto (born c. 1980), ballet dancer, American Ballet Theatre, Ballet Nacional del Sodre
- Flor de María Rodríguez (1913–2001), ballerina, choreographer and folklorist

== See also ==
- Women in dance
- List of dancers
- List of Indian women in dance
- List of prima ballerinas
