= Katherine Flowers =

Katherine Jefferson Flowers (1896–1982) was an African American dancer, choreographer and teacher who in 1944 opened the successful "Flowers School of Dance" in Chicago. She also carried out extensive research on the history of African American dance from the 19th century.

== Early life ==
Born in Sherman, Texas as the daughter of Mattie Jefferson (1877–1955), Flowers showed an interest in dance from the age of seven when she performed at folk festivals. In 1904, she moved with her parents to Kansas City, Missouri, where as a nine-year-old she danced with friends in her backyard. As an African-American, it was not easy for her to embark on a professional dance career but in 1913 she was able to study voice, dramatics and pageantry at Kansas State Teacher's College where she became a member of the Orchesis Society dance club. In the summer, she taught dance at the Kansas City YWCA.

== Career ==
Flowers' first assignment after graduation was as a physical education teacher at the Sumner High School in Cairo, Illinois. She also performed as a professional dancer at the Cairo Opera House. She returned to her studies in physical education at Northwestern University, Chicago, where she graduated in 1924. While she was there she began to take a special interest in the history of African-American dance, strongly encouraged by anthropologist Melville Herskovits who took a special interest in African studies. From 1924, she spent 25 years in Chicago teaching physical education in the city's public schools while continuing her interest in dance.

In 1944, Katherine Flowers opened the Flowers School of Dance in Chicago, teaching ballet and classical dance while forming a group of professional dancers known as the Katherine Flowers Dancers. By 1949, when she retired from public school teaching, she was devoting all her time to the dance company, with a production titled Bamboula to Ballet (later Bamboula to Bop) which presented the development of a truly African-American style of dance. The company made successful tours of the United States and Israel in the early 1950s which enabled her to join her son and daughter who had settled in Los Angeles. For a period, she operated a school of dance in there before moving to New York in 1955 where she again opened a school although neither of these was as successful as her school in Chicago. As a result, she took up additional work, teaching in the local public schools, arranging summer workshops, and teaching yoga to those working for the United Nations. She died in New York in July 1982.

Flowers' left two children, Posie and Orlando. Posie Flowers, who was also a dancer, performed in the Broadway production of Carmen Jones in the 1940s while Orlando Flowers Jr. (1920–1974) was the first African-American colonel in the California National Guard.

== Legacy ==
With a view to writing a history of African-American dance, over the years Flowers collected a substantial amount of information on the popularization of African-American dance in the 20th century and its origins in the 19th century. Her papers are now stored in the Northwestern University Archives. They also contain information about Katherine Dunham with whom she collaborated from the 1940s.
