= Berta Pereira =

Uruguayan percussionist, dancer and actor

- Born: Berta Pereira Majó; June 10, 1958 (age 67); Montevideo, Uruguay
- Occupations: actor; dancer, percussionist

Berta Pereira Majó (born June 10, 1958) is a Uruguayan percussionist, dancer, and actor who specializes in Afro-Uruguayan themes. In 1995, she founded the group Berta Pereira y las Comadres, which focuses on Afro-Uruguayan music and folklore. The band is well known for their candombe style of music and their participation in Memoria para armar, a musical performance and dramatic reading of testimonies by women imprisoned under the Uruguayan military dictatorship in the 1970s and 1980s.

== Biography ==
Born in Montevideo, Pereira grew up in a musical family, with both her parents playing the guitar. Her sister, a guitar teacher, taught her to play when she was only five. She went on to study the Uruguayan harp with Carlos Vega while taking lessons in ballet and contemporary dance. At the time, during the era of the Uruguayan dictatorship, the College of Fine Arts Instituto Escuela Nacional de Bellas Artes (Universidad de la República) was closed, and Pereira took various classes in the workshop of Zina Fernández: ceramics, drawing, painting, batik and goldsmithing. In addition, she studied ceramics at the Universidad del Trabajo del Uruguay. Later, she studied English, French, and Portuguese, and worked for a time as a translator and interpreter.

While living abroad in France and Panama, Pereira participated in various musical groups. In Panama, she acted in the street theater group Oveja Negra ("Black Sheep") directed by Ileana Solís Palma. She later formed her band named "Acertijo" together with Ventura Dríguez, Franz Gutiérrez and Marie Sanjur.

In 1990, after she returned to Uruguay and began to devote more time to her compositions, she met her husband to be, Pollo Píriz, whose music appealed to her. After their son Lorenzo was born in 1995, she formed the group "Las Comadres". They recorded a CD, "Comadres" and toured extensively throughout Uruguay, Argentina, Brasil, Colombia and Venezuela in such concert events as the Desfile de Llamadas, Heritage Day, Ciclos de Playas, International Women's Day, Bolsón Jazz Festival, Festival Los Tambores del Mundo, among others.

In 2001, at the Sala Zitarossa in Montevideo, Pereira and the Comadres Coro Afrogama, performed a theatrical, dance and choral opening performance at the launch of Memoria para armar, a reading of testimonial narratives documenting the history and memory of Uruguay's female political prisoners from the era of the military dictatorship. This opening consists of a group of women percussionists with large drums singing, yelling, and applauding while acting out the washing of clothing (white cloth) in a very afro-centric style. Pereira, who enters the stage carrying a bundle of laundry on her head, states "Traje un montón de ropa para lavar. Tengo tanta historia para lavar." ("I brought a ton of laundry to wash. I have so much history to wash.") Throughout the rest of the performance, Pereira and the Comadres' candombe music is interspersed with four women reading from the testimonies of the former prisoners and their families about life during the dictatorship.

As a musician, Pereira has played sessions with Uruguayan and Latino musicians such as Lobo Lagarde, Elbio Rodríguez Barilari, grupo Pataquín, Diego Avendaño and Bardo Khan. As a musician and actress, she has worked on various interdisciplinary collaborations with Afro-Cuban, Afro-Peruvian, and folkloric themes and has participated various times in the Uruguayan carnival parade. In 2005 she starred in a new adaptation of Ubu Rey (Ubu Roi by Alfred Jarrý (1873-1907)) with the group Polizonteatro directed by Enrique Permuy. She collaborated with poet Luis Bravo (poet) on a CD and live poetry performance Tamudando in 2009.

Pereira has released a number of CDs including "Comerse una manzana", "Bicho de luz", "Comadres", "Ambrosio", "Pedrito Malasartes" and "Gracias". Pereira and Píriz have been nominated for the Uruguayan Premio Graffiti for their CD's "Ambrosio" and "Gracias". According to Pereira, some of her most important musical influences have been Elis Regina, Mariana García Vigil, Maria Joao, Lenine, Richard Bona and Hugo Fattoruso.

== Discography ==
- Comadres (1995)
- Comerse una manzana (1996)
- La gran red del cielo (with Pollo Píriz) (1999)
- Bicho de luz (2001)
- Ambrosio (with Pollo Píriz) (2008)
- Tamudando (with Luis Bravo) (2009)
- Gracias (with Pollo Píriz) (2015)
