= Jenny Nilson =

Swedish ballet dancer and actress

Jenny Nilson (born 4 February 1973) is a Swedish ballet dancer and actress. She dances with the Royal Swedish Ballet where she became a soloist in 1999 and a principal dancer in 2001.

== Biography ==
Nilson attended the Swedish Ballet School, where she graduated in 1991. She also studied drama at the Stockholm Academy of Dramatic Arts and at the Royal Academy of Dramatic Art in London.

Leading parts with the Royal Swedish Ballet have included Odette/Odile in Swan Lake, the title role in Kenneth MacMillan's Manon, Tatania in John Cranko's Onegin and Helena in John Neumeier's A Midsummer Night's Dream. She has toured with the company in Japan, France and Germany.

In 2001, Jenny Nilson received the Philip Morris Ballet Flower Award.
