= Anne and Janneton Auretti =

18th-century French ballerinas

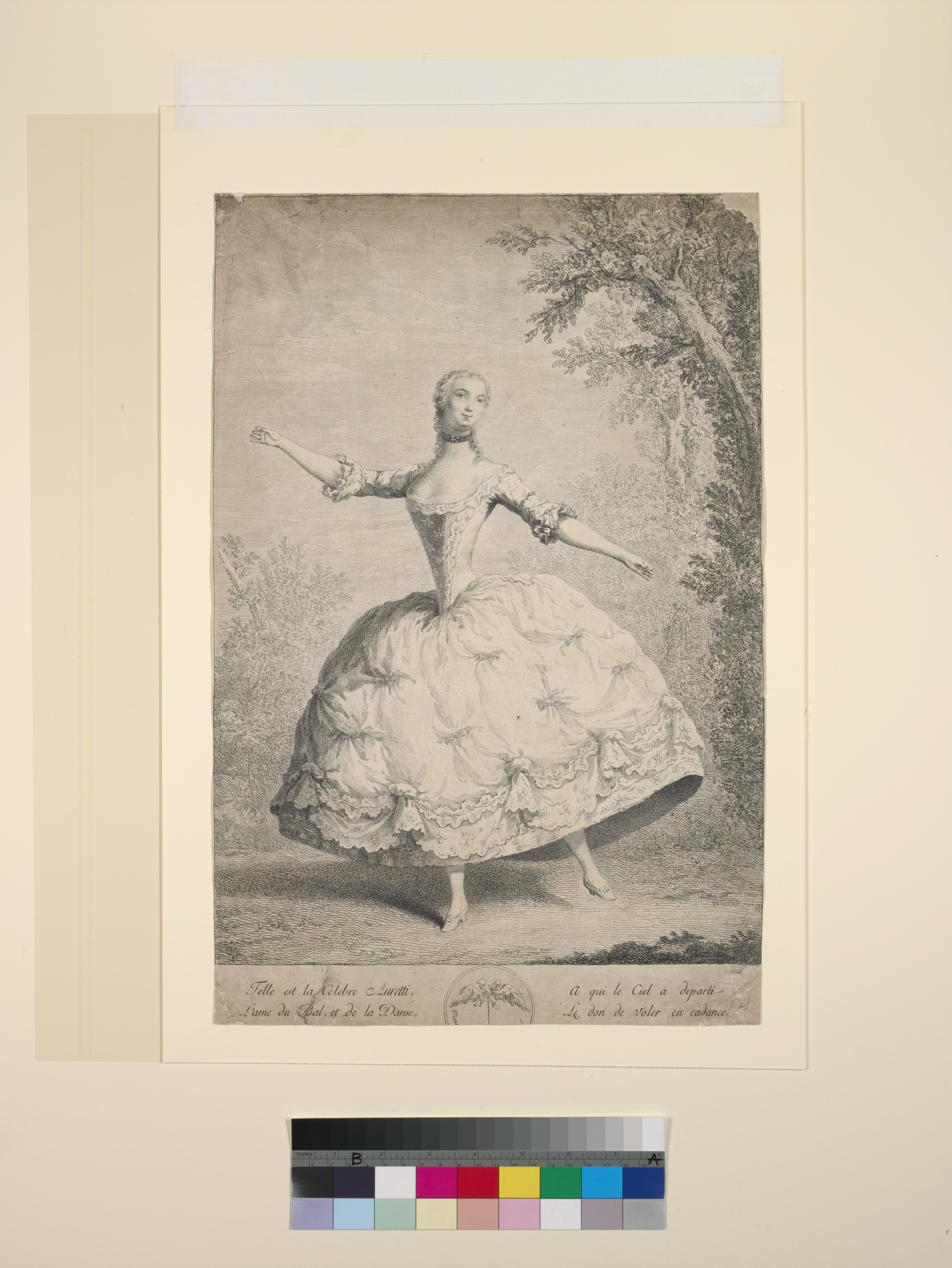
Anne (or possibly Janneton) Auretti (NYPL). Legend: Telle est la célèbre Auretti, / L'ame du Bal, et de la Danse, / A qui le Ciel a departi / Le don de voler en cadance.

Anne and Janneton (or Janeton) Auretti were French ballerinas who performed for London audiences and French royalty in the mid- to late-18th century. A dance named after them is still performed today.

== Career ==
Anne and Janneton Auretti were French ballerinas who danced in London and France, and were the 'dazzling stars of the King's Theatre, Covent Garden, and Drury Lane'. It is likely they were sisters, although possible they may have been mother and daughter. They arrived in London in 1742, although the first record of them in the London Daily Post is 3 January 1743, when Janneton danced the Characters of Dancing (a series of dances invented in 1715 by Françoise Prévost). The Aurettis were part of David Garrick's company.

== Critical reception ==
The Aurettis earned royal appreciation on both sides of the channel. Anne is claimed to have been the more famous of the two. On April 6, 1743 the play "The Spanish Fryar; or The Double Discovery" was performed at the Theatre Royal, Covent Garden at the command of the Prince and Princess of Wales, for the benefit of Anne Auretti. Shortly afterwards (Friday 22 April) Covent Garden Theatre held a benefit for Delamaine and Janneton Auretti.

In October that same year, the London Daily Post published an extract of a letter from Fontainbleau, describing the Aurettis and a Monsieur Delamain dancing before Louis XV and the French court twice:

"The 1st of this instant les Desmoiselles Anne and Janeton Auretti and Me Delamain had the Honour of Dancing before their Majesties the King and Queen of France, the Dauphin, the Princesses, and a numerous Court, with the greatest applause; and on the 3d their Majesties honoured them with an order to dance again: On their departure, by Order of their Majesties, the Duke of Gesvres presented each of the Desmoiselles Auretti with a Gold-Snuff-Box, of considerable value; and Mr Delamain with 600 Livres, with the highest compliments on their performance.”

Charles Burney, after watching a performance before the Duke of Cumberland in 1746, comments "The new dances by Auretti, and the charming Violetta, afterwards Mrs Garrick, were much more applauded than the songs, which, however, for the time, had considerable merit." From a dissertation on dance in The Lady's Magazine, 1785:

"The Louvre, which was formerly a dance very much the ton, is equally difficult, and some what similar to the Minuet de la Cour, in respect to the arms, and the graces with which it abounds. I never had the pleasure of seeing it performed but by some of the first dancers; the only one who excelled in this elegant dance was Mademoiselle Auretti. We have very few now who would presume to bring it into vogue again; at the same time, there are many who persuade the world, that the cotillon is preferable."

Tate Wilkinson, an actor and manager, wrote about the Aurettis in his memoirs of 1790:

“Drury-Lane 1747

A set of very capital dancers was this year at Drury-Lane:- Mr. Cooke, Monsieur Grand-champs, Madam Auretti, (in the serious style) in great estimation, and Madamoiselle Janeton Auretti.

A favorite pantomime dance was served up often, called the Savoyard Travellers.

Madame Auretti continued only the season following, when her benefit was commanded by his Majesty George the Second.-Play, the Strategem.-Mr. Garrick acted Archer. – After which she retired from the stage, and Mr. Cooke went over to Covent-Garden the season following."

It is unclear when the Aurettis retired. Both are billed after 1748, when Wilkinson claimed Anne Auretti to have retired. It is clear they were both still dancing in 1753, when, on 24 April, the Theatre-Royal put on a comedy The Nonjuror for the benefit of Miss Janeton Auretti. The performance included dances "by Mad. Auretti and ...Madam Janeton Auretti", among others. On 26 March 1754, a benefit was held for a Mad. Auretti at Drury-Lane, where she danced 'A New Dance Call'd Le Passecalle de Zaid’ by Auretti.

A Mademoiselle Auretti is listed as a principal ballerina in an opera The Royal Shepherd printed in 1765, and performed at the King's Theatre Haymarket in March 1765. Further, on 28 March 1765 Madame Auretti is listed as a dancer between the acts of Antigonus, at the King's Theatre, and again at the same theatre in May of that year in Il Solimano.

== References in popular culture ==
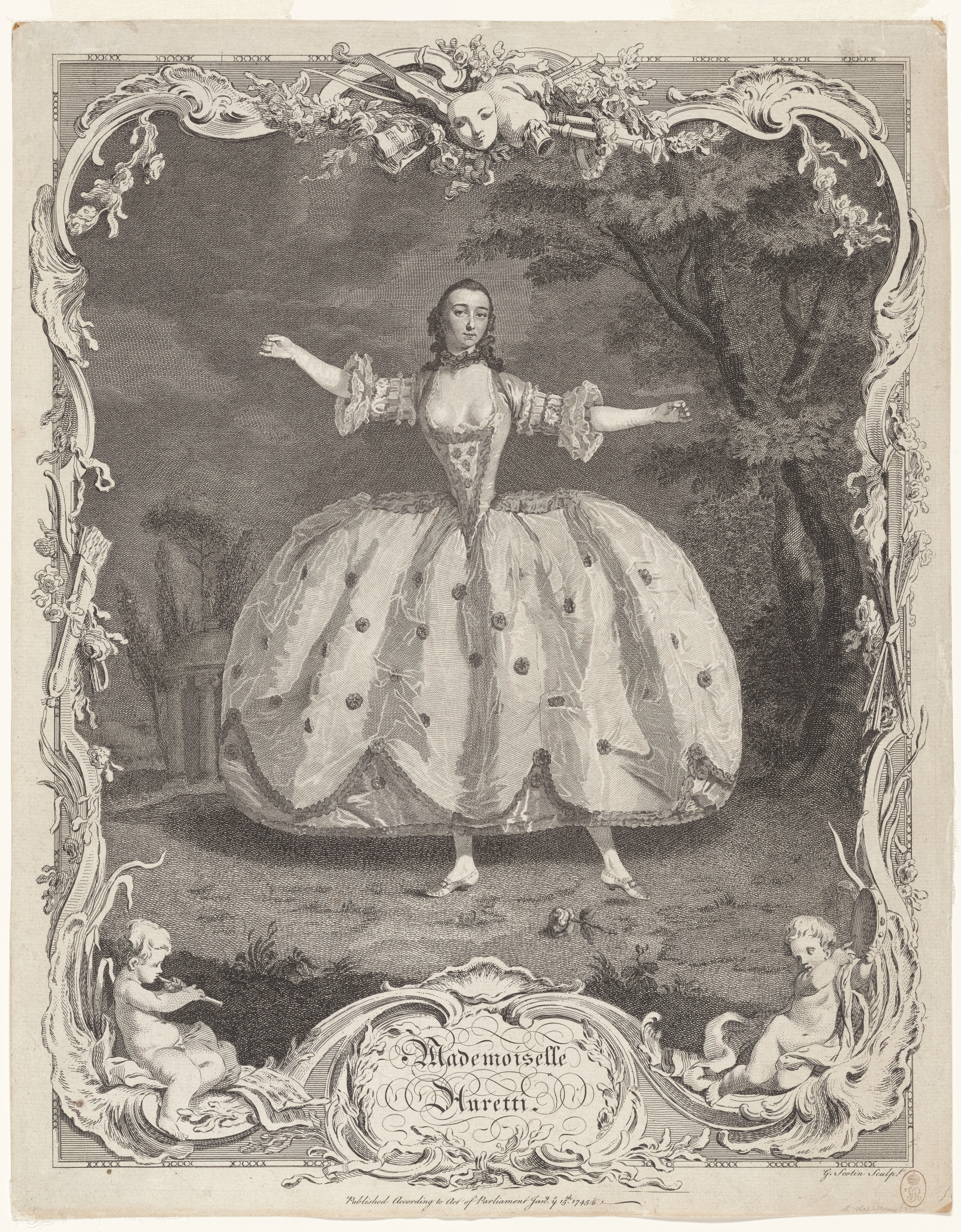
Mademoiselle Auretti, print by Scotin

The Auretti's then entered popular culture as a byword for grace, with many mentions in poetry and prose. For example, from a book published in 1753: "The Goddess was washing her hands as she received their petitions; she cast a good-natured look toward them, as they knelt to her; and dangling her left-hand with all the jaunty ease of an Auretti, shook off a drop of the suds from the tip of her finger."

From the Public Advertiser, 1754:

"On the Artificial Aviary, now exhibiting facing the Mews, Charing-Cross.

Tongue cannot to the full express

The sweet Variety,

With which their tuneful Throats address

The list'ning Company.

From Nature’s Tunes to Art they range,

Now touch the shady Grove,

Now to th'Italian Musick change,

Thus thro’ the circle rove.

No Care is here requir’d, no Pains,

Their Beauties to enhance,

That sing unto a Handel’s Strains,

Or an Auretti’s Dance.”

And from the Gray's Inn Journal 1754:

“Before Miss could walk, in the Mother’s Eye she danced with all the Elegance of Auretti, and as soon as her tongue began to utter imperfect words, “Lord what a deal of wit the child has?...”

From Birth of Fashion: An Epistolary Tale by William Mason (written in 1746 and sent to a Lady)

"...And Grecian Belles, that look'd as pretty,

And mov'd as graceful as Auretti*...

*A celebrated Opera Dancer then in Vogue"

One particular mention was more of a backhanded compliment. In "The town. A satire.", William Kenrick writes:

"Behold the Stage, where Shakespear once could charm,

And Rowe with sacred Fire each Bosom warm:

E’en there low Folly finds a kind Retreat,

Whilst Shakespear’s trod beneath the Dancer’s Feet."

"To what low Ebb is Taste and Judgment grown,

That Sense must need a Dance, to please the Town.

Soft, Otway’s Lines found tedious to the Pit,

And all expectant for *Auretti sit."

Blush, senseless Audience, blush to see a Play’r,

(Whose Sounds of Sense should charm th’attentive Ear)

Go silent off, or seldom more can boast

Than the poor Gall’ry’s half-strain’d Praise at most

Yet if **Janeton shakes her slender Feet,

How the loud Thunder clatters thro’ the Pit:

How oft we see the Hero half divine,

In noble Worth and gen’rous Passion shine"

"*A favourite Dancer"

"**Auretti"

David Garrick was famously not so happy with the Auretti family, and provides a hint suggesting that Anne and Janneton were sisters: "Miss Auretti, Monsr Pitro. Madme Janeton ye Father, Mother and all their Generation may kiss my A-Se; I am so sick of their no Meaning messages and compliments that I every time I see her name in a letter, my Stomach falls a heaving".

== Dances named for Auretti ==
There are at least two dances named for one or both of the Aurettis, the most well-known of which these days is Auretti's Dutch Skipper, which was first published in 1756 in Rutherford's Compleat Collection of the most Celebrated Country Dances. An earlier copy from 1745 can be seen in the handwritten Kitty Bridge's Pocket Book. It is not clear if the published version is the same Dutch Skipper that Monsieur Delamain and Mademoiselle Anne Janneton were billed as dancing in 1743.

A video of the Hampshire Regency Dancers performing Auretti's Dutch Skipper https://www.youtube.com/watch?v=G33N0yoJ6xk&feature=channel&list=UL

== Images of Anne or Janneton Auretti ==
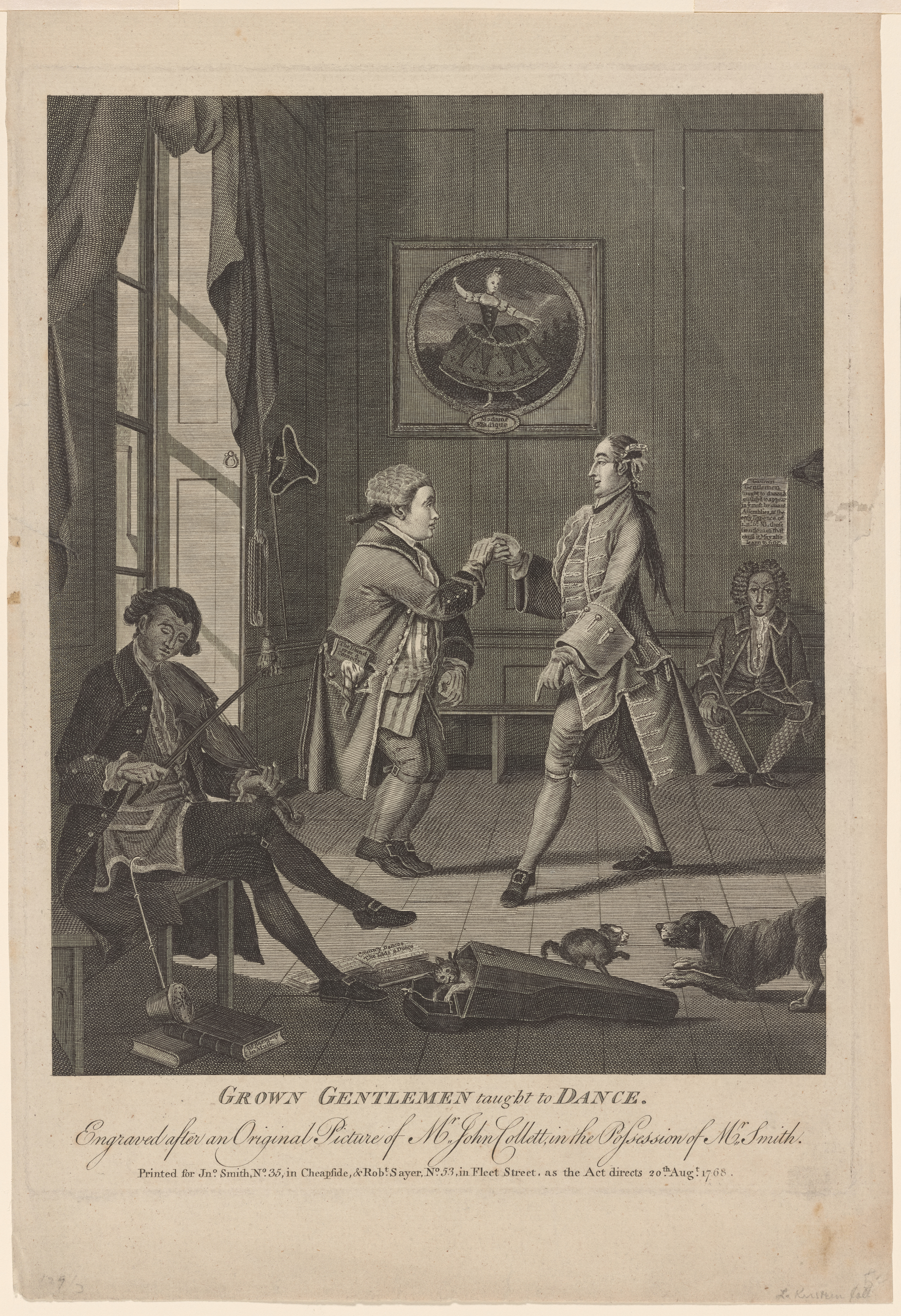
Grown gentlemen taught to dance (John Collett, 1768) featuring 'Madam Elastique' in the background.

There are several extant images of a Mademoiselle Auretti, for instance the Scotin print of Mademoiselle Auretti in V&A published 15 January 1745. These are likely to be etchings made from a lost portrait by Carlotta Amigoni. The portraits are of either Anne or Janneton Auretti. The Royal Collection Trust has several portraits of a dancer referred to as Celeste Auretti; it is unclear how this dancer is related to Anne or Janneton.

In "Images of the Dance", dance historian Lillian Moore reproduces an engraving of a John Collett painting called "Grown Gentlemen taught to dance", in the background of which is a painting titled "Madam Elastique". Moore says this painting is almost certainly Anne Auretti, although it is not clear how she reached this conclusion. In other engravings of the painting, and the original painting, the dancer's picture is untitled.
