= Usha Jey =

French-Tamilian dancer

- Born: 24 November 1996 (age 29)
- Citizenship: France
- Occupation: dancer

Usha Jey is a French-Tamilian dancer. She is known for performing dances styled after hip-hop and Bharatanatyam, which she calls "Hybrid Bharatnatyam". She has performed in New York City's Vogue World Runway and at the 2022 edition of the United Kingdom's Commonwealth Games.
