= Mona El Said =

Egyptian belly dancer and actress

- Born: 1954; Suez Canal, Egypt
- Died: February 9, 2024 (aged 69–70)
- Occupations: Belly dancer; Actress; Dance teacher
- Years active: 1970–2024

Mona El Said (1954 – 9 February 2024) was an Egyptian belly dancer and actress. She was one of the leading performers of Raqs Sharqi during the 1970s and 1980s, and was known for her emotional interpretation of music and her role in popularising Egyptian dance internationally. She performed extensively in Egypt, Lebanon, and Europe, which helped introduce Egyptian belly dance to global audiences.

== Career ==
Mona El Said rose to prominence in Cairo during the 1970s and 1980s, performing at major venues such as the Nile Hilton and Sheraton Hotels. She became a headline performer at elite nightclubs, securing her place among Egypt’s most celebrated dancers. Her fame extended internationally with performances in Lebanon, Europe, and London's top cabarets.

In the 1980s, Mona El Said’s performances were among the first Egyptian Raqs Sharqi shows to be widely available on videotape, helping to transmit Egyptian dance culture globally. She later participated in prestigious international dance festivals, including the Mediterranean Delight Festival in Greece.

After living abroad for several years, Mona returned to Egypt in the 1990s and continued to perform at elite venues.

== Dance philosophy ==
Mona El Said emphasized the emotional and musical connection in her dance. She was renowned for embodying "dalaʿ," a sweet yet confident sensuality expressed through subtle shoulder movements, facial expressions, long flowing hair, and sincere musical interpretation.

She believed that authentic dance required not only technical skill but also feeling and connection to the music. As a mentor, she inspired dancers such as Camelia to prioritize emotional expression over rigid choreography.

== Style ==
Mona El Said’s style combined technical precision with improvisational freedom. She integrated graceful upper body isolations, hip work, intricate footwork, and emotional storytelling into her performances. Her style reflected both classical Egyptian raqs sharqi traditions and the evolving popular music influences of the 1970s and 1980s.

== Legacy ==
Mona El Said remains a major influence on both Egyptian and international belly dancers. Her early videotapes contributed to the globalization of Egyptian belly dance culture, and her performances continue to inspire dancers worldwide. She is often celebrated for maintaining a balance between emotional authenticity and technical brilliance, leaving a lasting mark on the art of Raqs Sharqi.
