= Mijaela Tesleoanu =

Mijaela Tesleoanu (March 20, 1942 – August 17, 2011) was a Romanian dancer, classical ballet teacher, and ballet master who developed her artistic work in Cuba.

== Early years ==
Mijaela Tesleoanu was born in Bucharest in 1942. She studied at the National University of Music Bucharest before joining the Romanian National Opera. She met and married the Cuban baritone, Ramón Calzadilla, in 1963 while he was on a studying on scholarship in Romania.

== Career ==
After settling in Cuba in 1963, she contacted Fernando Alonso and was an integral member of the Cuban National Ballet (Ballet Nacional de Cuba; BNC). A member of the corps de ballet, she performed in 19th century classics as well as contemporary pieces. Tesleoanu participated in the 1963 film, Giselle by Enrique Pineda Barnet, which was produced by the Instituto Cubano del Arte e Industria Cinematográficos.

After retiring from the stage in 1987, Tesleoanu worked as a ballet teacher not only in Havana, but also with various companies and universities in Latin America, such as the University de Santiago de Chile, Autonomous University of Chihuahua, Ballet Clásico de Hermosillo, Ballet de Cámara de Jalisco, Caracas Contemporary Ballet, and National Ballet of Guatemala, receiving a degree in ballet in 1994 from the Cuban Higher Institute of Art. In 2008, it was reported that Tesleoanu was one of only two non-Cubans on the payroll of the BNC; she received the company's Medal of Merit in 2010. She also received the Distinction for National Culture award in 2007 from the Cuban Culture Minister. She died in Havana in 2011.
