= Sofia Karlsson (dancer) =

Swedish modern dancer (born 1978)

Sofia Karlsson (born 1978) is a Swedish modern dancer. She holds bachelor's degree of Dance Pedagogy from Danshögskolan and master's degree of Dance from Finnish Theatre Academy.

She has most recently worked with choreographers Kenneth Kvarnström and Hiroaki Umeda.

== Appearances ==
- Destruction Song 2008
- Work in Progress 2008
- Rush Man Waiting Mind 2008
- Daydream Junkies 2007
- Pikkurikolliset 2007
- Absoluutti 2007
- Gorgeous Gavin 2007
- Granny Smith 2006
- Viivana 2006
- Second Hand Shop - toisen käden kauppa 2006
- Hämärän hohde 2005
- Raw Dog 2005
- The Fallen Ones 2004
- POINT 2003
