= Cristina Caprioli =

Swedish choreographer

Cristina Caprioli (born 22 October 1953) is an Italian-born artist and academic who is a prominent choreographer in Sweden.

Critics have noted Caprioli for the clarity, stringency and precision of her work, she has worked with stage performances, installations, videos, objects and publications. She has played a significant role in the development of the critical discourse in the Swedish field of dance and choreography.

As an independent artist and as professor at the University of Dance and Circus (DOCH) in Stockholm, Caprioli has developed methods and formats for artistic research.

== Biography ==
Caprioli was born and raised in Northern Italy. She studied dance in early age and soon developed a particular interest for modern dance. She worked as a professional dancer in New York, Sweden, Germany and Austria. In 1983 she moved to Stockholm where she still lives and works.

During the mid-1990s, Caprioli began choreographing. In 1998 she founded CCAP, an independent organization for sustainment of choreography, where she has produced more than 30 works. Through CCAP, Caprioli produces stage performances, installations, videos, objects, publications and choreography, and runs long-term interdisciplinary research projects.

In 2008, Caprioli was appointed Professor of Choreography at the University of Dance and Circus (DOCH) in Stockholm. In 2004 she founded c.off, a non-profit independent site for development and exchange of interdisciplinary choreographies, located in Stockholm.

Caprioli has curated and produced the festivals Talking Dancing (1997) and Movement is a Woman (2002), the research projects t.lab (2004) and after cover (2009-2011). She has also been the editor of the dance anthology Choreographies (2008) and curated and produced the WEAVING POLITICS symposium (2012).

=== Awards ===
She was awarded the Illis quorum by the government of Sweden in 2021.

In 2024, she was awarded the Golden Lion for Lifetime Achievement by the La Biennale di Venezia.
