= Louise Henderson (burlesque) =

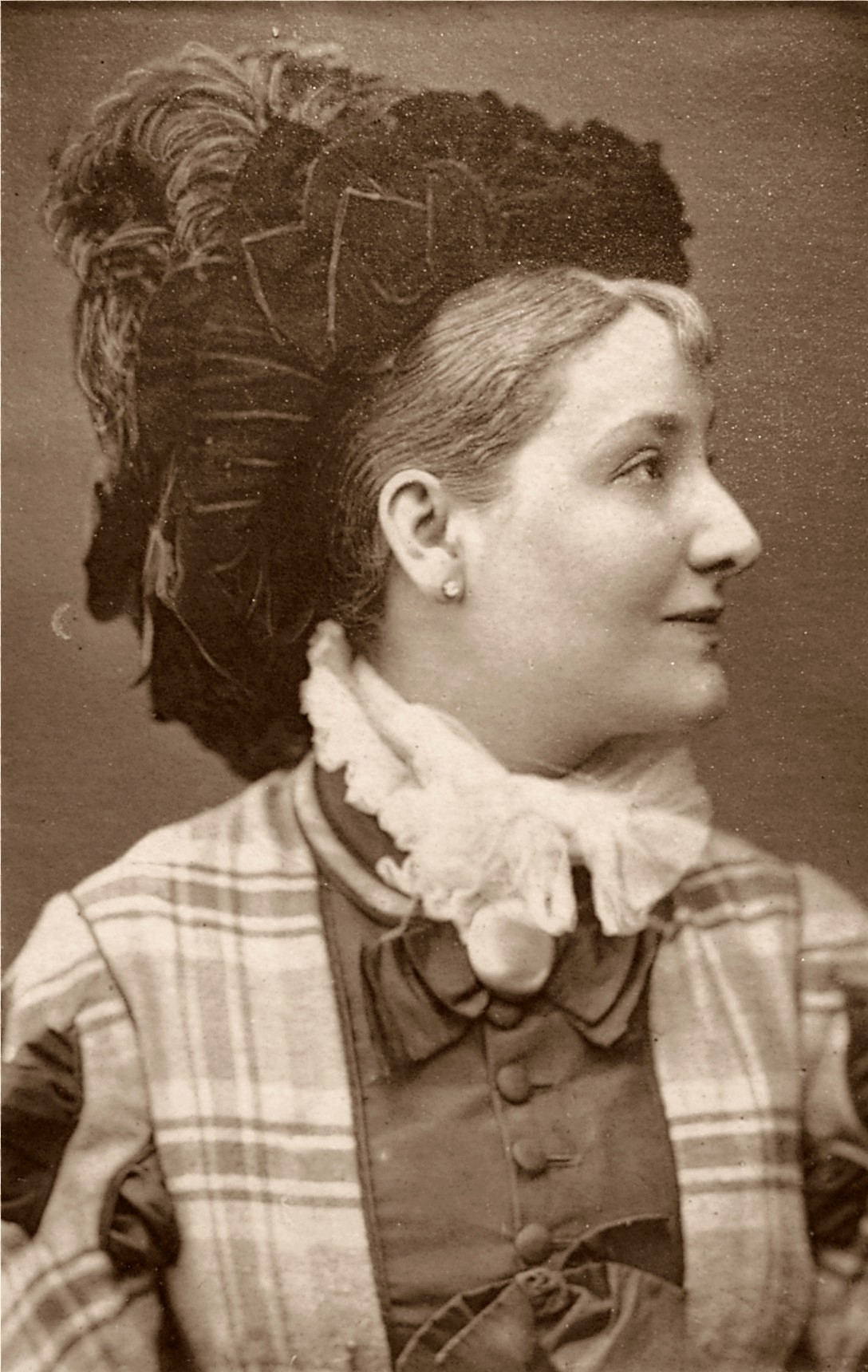
Louise Henderson

Louise Henderson was an English musical burlesque actress. She appeared in productions at the Gaiety Theatre, London and at the Opera Comique in London. She is described as a leading lady by W. J. MacQueen-Pope.
