= Luminița Dumitrescu =

Romanian ballet dancer (born 1941)

Luminița Dumitrescu-Kuhn
- Born: Luminița Dumitrescu; 22 May 1941 (age 84); Bucharest
- Known for: Ballet

Luminița Dumitrescu (born 22 May 1941) is a Romanian classical ballet dancer, choreographer, and teacher. She was principal dancer at the Romanian National Opera in Bucharest. Since 1990, she has directed the Höchst Ballet Center in Frankfurt am Main.

She is one of the early Romanian dancers who were trained at the Vaganova Academy of Russian Ballet in Leningrad.

== Life and career ==
Born on 1941 in Bucharest, daughter of Paula and Julius. As a child, she received piano and ballet lessons and was later accepted into the Bucharest Ballet School. Her early talent for classical ballet was already noted in the contemporary Romanian press. A French-language article in the newspaper Roumanie Nouvelle from 1955 mentions her among several well-known Romanian ballet students.

In 1954, Dumitrescu was selected to study at the Vaganova Ballet Academy in Leningrad, along with other Romanian students. She completed her training in 1960 and subsequently returned to Romania. Upon her return, she became a member of the ballet company of the Romanian National Opera in Bucharest. She stayed there for several years.

In 1967 and 1968, she took on the dual lead role as prima ballerina in the ballet The Prince and the Pauper (Romanian: Prinț și Cerșetor), which garnered her considerable public attention. Die Welt particularly highlighted her portrayal of the two contrasting characters. Her interpretation of the work remained in the repertoire for several years and was advertised in national and international newspapers, initially as prima ballerina, later as assistant choreographer.

In 1980 and 1981, she worked as a guest choreographer and ballet mistress at the Cultural Center of the Philippines (CCP) in Manila, where she staged Sleeping Beauty with the Philippine principal dancer Nonoy Froilan and Don Quixote for the Philippine Ballet. She also contributed to the production of The Nutcracker in 1980 and Don Quixote in 1981.

In 1990, she returned to Manila to stage Don Quixote again. Contemporary press reports mention her close connection to Philippine cultural circles and her long-standing personal acquaintance with the diplomat Leticia Ramos-Shahani.

== Publications ==
- Björn Bordon and Nicole Duplois: Luminiţa, Ballerina: Autobiografische Skizzen einer Ballerina und Choreografin, Deutschland, 2018, ISBN 978-3-946329-00-8.
- Höchster Ballettzentrum: Luminița, Ballerina – Das künstlerische und private Leben einer rumänischen Primaballerina, Frankfurt Höchst, 2025, ISBN 978-3-00-082738-9.
