= Mette Bødtcher =

Danish ballet dancer

Mette Bødtcher (born 1965) is a Danish ballet dancer. Trained at the Royal Danish Theatre's ballet school, she joined the Royal Danish Ballet in 1983. She performed Ophelia in John Neumeier's Amleth at the Hamburg Ballet in 1985, where she became a soloist in 1986. In Hamburg she danced the title role in La Sylphide before returning to Copenhagen where she performed in Balanchine's Serenade and Flemming Flindt's The Triumph of Death. She has also danced Alvin Ailey's dramatic solo sequence Witness.

Since reaching the age of 40, she has continued to play character parts.
