= Elena Surgutskaya =

Russian dancer and choreographer

Elena Surgutskaya is a Russian dancer and choreographer.

== Biography ==
Surgutskaya's career started at the age of 5. She was formally trained in Ballet, Jazz dance and gymnastics, each of which helped her to develop unique dance style, a combination of ballroom dancing, flexibility and grace. During her first 4 years of training Surgutskaya took the first place and became a finalist in Russian International Standard Championship. After graduating high school she was accepted into the Russian Dance Academy. At the age of 21 Surgutskaya left her home country and family, moved to New York City, and was accepted into the Fred Astaire Dance Studios.

== Membership in associations requiring outstanding achievements ==
Surgutskaya's talent and acclaim permitted her participation in the highest realm of competitions, competing in those events sanctioned and authorized by the world's primary dancesport authority, the International Dance Sport Federation (IDSF) and National Dance Council of America (NDCA).

== Competition and commercial success ==
Surgutskaya has an extensive dance background with more than 30 national and international dance competitions. She won the Moscow and National Championship titles. Surgutskaya was chosen to be one of the main dancers for famous DJ Tiesto tour program in 2011. She was advertising and performing together with Russian celebrities such as Sultan Ibragimov, Wladimir Klitschko, music band Uma2rman, singer Avraam Russo and many others.

Surgutskaya has used her talents for the betterment of others, participating in fundraising events.
