= Antonietta Dell'Era =

Italian ballet dancer

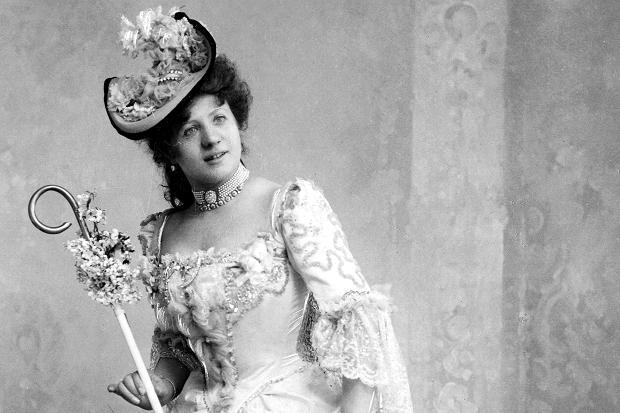
- Born: 10 February 1860; Milan, Italy
- Died: 22 June 1945; Berlin, Germany

Antonietta Dell'Era (10 February 1860 Milan — 22 June 1945 Berlin) was an Italian prima ballerina best known for originating the role of the Sugar Plum Fairy in Tchaikovsky's ballet, The Nutcracker (1892).

== Dance career ==
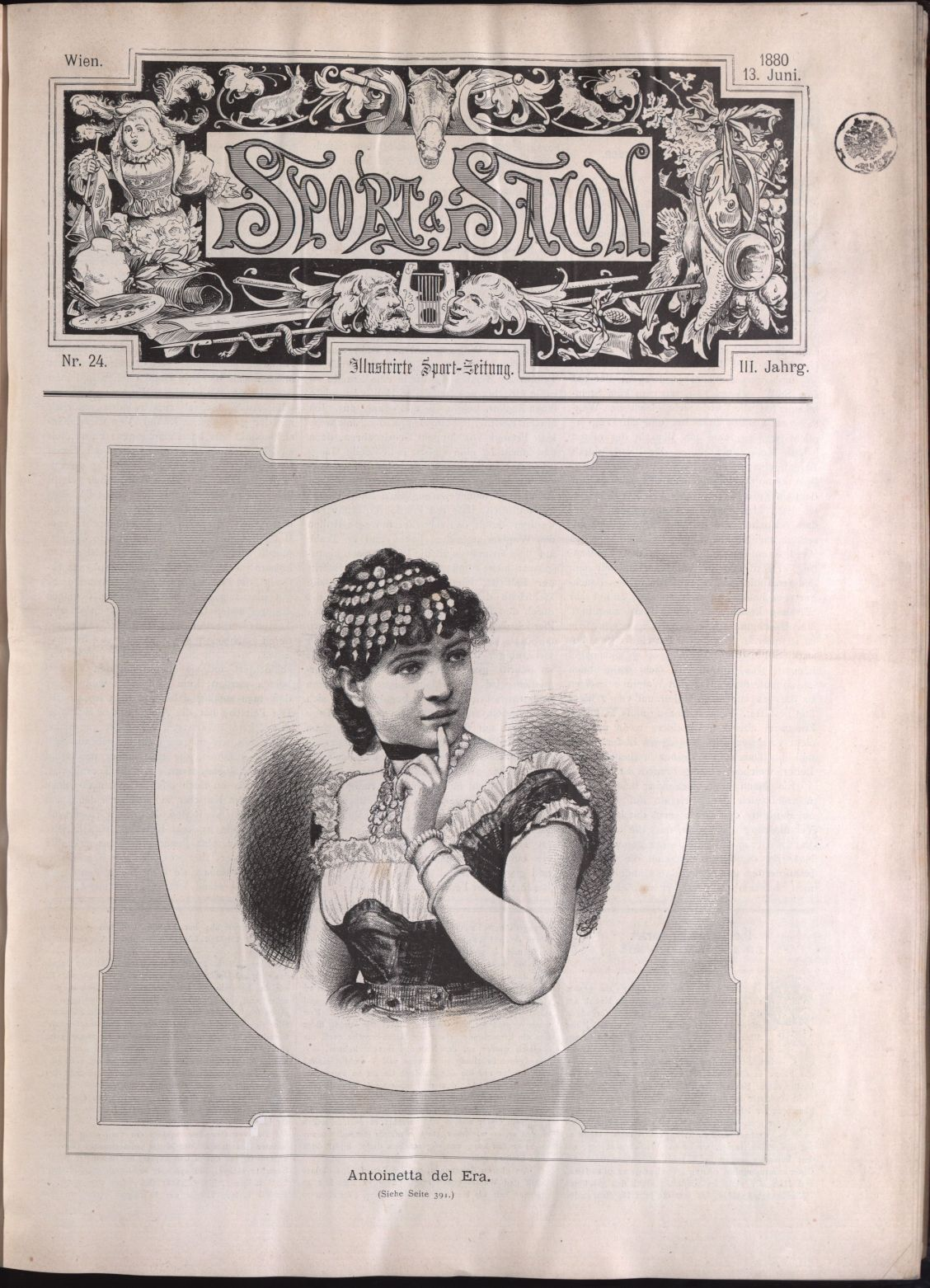
Antonietta Dell'Era as part of the Berlin Ballet, 1880

Between 1879 and 1909, Dell'Era had a successful career at the Berlin Opera, receiving praise from many critics and writers including author and poet Theodor Fontane. Between 1886 and 1894, she danced in Russia, mainly in St. Petersburg, as an export of the "Italian Invasion" - an influx of talented Italian dancers to Russia that included Pierina Legnani, Enrico Cecchetti, and Virginia Zucchi.

=== The Nutcracker ===
In 1892, Dell'Era created the role of the Sugar Plum Fairy in The Nutcracker, a new ballet conceived by mastermind choreographer Marius Petipa and composed by Pyotr Tchaikovsky. The ballet premièred at the Mariinsky Theatre in St. Petersburg on December 17, 1892, as a double feature alongside Tchaikovsky's last opera, Iolanta; tickets to the première were sold out. Dell'Era reportedly received five curtain calls, but critical reception of the ballet was poor. Russian ballet dancer Nicolai Solyannikov was unimpressed by Dell'Era's performance: "this coarse, ungraceful dancer is much to the German taste". The influence of politics and current affairs on the evolution of ballet is well-documented, and during Dell'Era‘s time as a leading ballerina in Russia, dancers were influenced by the rise of expressionism and increasing opposition to the rigidity of classic ballet; she had in fact received better critical reception for her role as Aurora in The Sleeping Beauty.

== Legacy ==
Before her death in 1945, Dell'Era had expressed a wish that her estate should help dancers in need. The Dell'Era-Gedächtnis-Stiftung foundation was established after her death to provide dancers and their families with financial assistance towards living costs and expenses, such as medical costs, training and retraining.
