= Ida Herion =

German dance teacher

Ida Herion (1876–1959) was a female German dance teacher, who from 1912 ran a dance school in Stuttgart named "Schule für Musik und Körperkultur".

In the 1920s Herion's students were the subject of two books with photographical illustrations.

Herion's dance school has been regarded as providing a distinctively modernist view of nudity and the body:

Herion linked nudism and ecstatic dance not to the recovery of an atavistic, primordial state of freedom but to the achievement of an aristocratic freedom or remoteness from any familiar place, be it wilderness, the bourgeois studio, or the conventional theatre stage. Ecstasy resulted from the elegantly poised beauty of the dancing body, its ability to create its own beautiful world.
