= Carmencita Romero =

American dancer and choreographer

- Born: Lily Butler; 1914; Chicago, Illinois, U.S.
- Died: May 6, 2001 (aged 87); New York City, U.S.
- Occupations: Dancer; choreographer; dance teacher

Carmencita Romero (born Lily Butler; 1914 – May 6, 2001) was an American dancer, choreographer, and dance teacher. She was associated with Katherine Dunham's company, appeared in the original Broadway productions of Cabin in the Sky and Carmen Jones, and was connected to Chicago's Artists and Models Ball and her 1947 revue Pagan Drums. She later worked as a dance educator in the United States, Europe, Tokyo, and Rome, with teaching and organizational connections including Spelman College, The Ailey School, Studio Watts Workshop, and the Nanette Bearden Contemporary Dance Theatre.

== Early life ==
Romero was born Lily Butler in Chicago in 1914.

== Career ==
Romero joined Katherine Dunham's troupe at age 18 and changed her name after joining the company. She toured with Dunham's company as a featured soloist until 1942.

Romero was active in the arts community of Chicago's South Side during the period. Julian Marvin Swain performed with her in the Annual Artists Ball at the Savoy and traveled with her to Toronto in 1940. A historical essay on the South Side Community Art Center states that the Artists and Models Ball first brought Romero to prominence as a dancer and dance teacher.

Romero appeared in the original Broadway production of Cabin in the Sky, which ran from October 25, 1940, to March 8, 1941, where she was credited as a Katherine Dunham dancer. She also appeared in the original Broadway production of Carmen Jones, which ran from December 2, 1943, to February 10, 1945, where she was credited as a dancer.

In the late 1940s, Romero returned to Chicago and opened a dance school. The William McBride Jr. Papers at the Chicago Public Library include a listing for Romero's Pagan Drums, presented at DuSable Auditorium in Chicago on March 1, 1947. She later opened dance schools in Tokyo and Rome, and taught throughout Europe.

== Teaching ==
After returning to the United States in 1981, Romero became an instructor at Spelman College in Atlanta. She also taught dance history at The Ailey School. Studio Watts Workshop opened in Los Angeles in 1964 and offered free classes taught by artists including Romero; another source, citing Jayne Cortez's account of the organization, identifies Romero as the workshop's dance instructor.

The New York Public Library Archives states that the Nanette Bearden Contemporary Dance Theatre worked with several African-American choreographers and dancers, including Romero.

Romero's teaching was also connected to Katherine Dunham's technique. Dance writer Wendy Perron wrote that Walter Nicks and Romero kept the Dunham technique alive in Europe. PBS's Free to Dance biography of Dunham names Romero among the teachers who helped carry the technique into later generations.

A WorldCat catalogue record lists Romero among the contributors to a 1983 Dance Black America symposium recording on Caribbean and Latin American influences in American dance.

In 1996, Romero was a panelist in Classic Black: The Experience of the Black Dancer in Choosing a School, presented by the Dance Collection of The New York Public Library for the Performing Arts and the Dance Research Foundation.

In 1999, Romero taught a workshop at ImPulsTanz Vienna International Dance Festival, where it was listed as "Modern Ethnic Dance".

Nichelle Nichols began studying dance under Romero at the age of twelve. The HistoryMakers biography of dancer Najwa I states that her study of African dance in New York City was enriched by several teachers, including Romero.

== Death ==
Romero died at a nursing home in New York City on May 6, 2001, at age 87.
