= Patricia Rianne =

New Zealand ballet dancer and choreographer

Patricia Elizabeth Rianne (born 1943) is a retired New Zealand ballet dancer and choreographer.

== Biography ==
Rianne was born and raised in Palmerston North. She danced with the New Zealand Ballet and then in 1962 won a New Zealand government scholarship to attend the Royal Ballet School in London. After graduating, she danced as a soloist in the Marseilles Ballet, France and then joined Ballet Rambert in London as a principal dancer. In 1969 she joined Western Theatre Ballet and later became a founding member of Scottish Ballet.

Rianne also choreographed original ballets such as Bliss, based on Katherine Mansfield's short story, for the Royal New Zealand Ballet, and in 1980 she produced The Nutcracker for the company.

== Personal life ==
Rianne married Michael Lloyd, an orchestral conductor, and the couple had two children.
