= Maki Kawamura =

Japanese ballerina

Maki Kawamura (川村真樹 Kawamura Maki, born in Iwate Prefecture on February 9, 1979) is a Japanese ballerina for New National Theatre Tokyo. She became a contract dancer with the New National Theatre Ballet Company in the fall of 1999. In her first season, she was selected to play the lead role of Viola in Ishii Jun's Twelfth Night. In 2007, she danced Princess Aurora in Sleeping Beauty, her first leading role in a full-length ballet. After this she played leading roles mainly in classical works, such as Swan Lake and Raymonda. She achieved the rank of principal dancer in May 2011, and retired two years later in June 2013, after playing the role of Kitri in a production of Don Quixote.

== Awards and honours ==
- 1st Prize in the Junior Class at the 1994 Kobe Dance Competition.
- 1st Prize in the Junior Class at the 1994 All Japan Ballet Competition.
- Won the Scholarship prize of Prix de Lausanne (the International dance competition in Lausanne) in 1995.
