= Florence Pigott =

English operatic singer and dancer

Florence Piggot
- Born: Florence Beatrice Pigott; 3 December 1878; England
- Died: 22 November 1899 (aged 20); Marlborough, Massachusetts, U.S.
- Occupation(s): Dancer, singer

Florence Beatrice Pigott (3 December 1878 – 22 November 1899) was an English ballet dancer and opera singer.

== Career ==
Pigott made her American debut as a member of the corps in an Italian opera in 1896 at the Academy of Music in Boston, Massachusetts. She came with her sister from London, both of them under the tutelage of Colonel Mapelson. Soon she was given a place in the corps of the Metropolitan Opera Company in New York City.

Her first performance of significance at the Metropolitan came in Very Little Faust. She was presented the role by manager William Parry after he discovered Pigott could both dance and sing. Very Little Faust played during the summer of 1897 at Manhattan Beach. She impressed audiences with her vivacious personality and musical talent.

== Later life and death ==
Theatrical people began to discuss Pigott as having a bright future as a soubrette. However, during a performance of Sad Sea Waves she contracted a cold which left her with lung trouble. Her condition worsened and she returned with her sister back to England.

Her health began to further deteriorate and she returned to America in the hope that the climate would save her. She died of consumption in 1899 in Marlborough, Massachusetts at the home of her aunt. Pigott's sister later performed in the Maurice Grau Opera Company in Chicago, Illinois.
