= Shino Mori =

Japanese ballerina

Shino Mori (森 志乃 Mori Shino, born in Gunma Prefecture 1989) is a Japanese-born ballerina for the National Ballet of Canada.

== Career ==
She entered Reiko Yamamoto Ballet Company in 1997. She joined The National Ballet of Canada's Apprentice programme in 2008 and became a member of the Corps de Ballet in 2009.

== Awards and honours ==
- Semi-finalist of Prix de Lausanne (the International dance competition in Lausanne) in 2004.
- Won the Scholarship prize of Prix de Lausanne in 2006.
