= Anna Valev =

Swedish ballet dancer

Anna Valev, née Backman (born 1969) is a Swedish ballet dancer. Until her retirement from active dancing in 2012, she was a principal dancer with the Royal Swedish Ballet.

== Biography ==
Born in Täby in Stockholm County, she took an early interest in dance, attending ballet classes five days a week by the time she was eight years old. From the age of 10, she attended the Royal Theatre Ballet School, after which she spent two years at the Royal Swedish Ballet School, also completing her secondary education there in 1987. She immediately joined the Royal Swedish Ballet, becoming a soloist in 1992 and a principal dancer in 1994.

In her 25 years with the Royal Swedish Ballet, Valev danced leading roles in the wide-ranging repertory of the company, performing in both classical ballets and contemporary works. Her preferred roles have been those with strong personal content such as the title role in Romeo and Juliet (ballet) or Julie in Birgit Cullberg's Fröken Julie. Her final assignment was in Pontus Lidberg's The Little Match Girl Passion in April 2012.
