= Van Le Ngoc =

Vietnamese ballet dancer

Van Le Ngoc (Lê Ngọc Vǎn) is a ballet dancer and a choreographer. Born in Hanoi, Vietnam, he moved to live and study in France in 1996. From 1996 to 1998, he followed his study to become a ballet dancer at National Superior Conservatory of Music and Dance in Lyon (CNSM). In September 1998, Van signed his first contract with the Ballet National de Marseille, under the direction of Marie-Claude Pietragalla, Etoile of the Paris Opera Ballet. Five years later in 2003, he left Ballet National de Marseille to join the English National Ballet in London.

== Choreography repertoire ==
- 2006 – "Without Words" Music by Yann Tiersan, English National Ballet choreographic workshop
- 2007 – "Les Emotions" Music by Sakoto, commissioned by English National Ballet for Synergy Program
- 2008 – "Duo" Music by Petru Guelfucci, Varna Ballet Competition
- 2009 – "Concerto for Five" Music by J.S Bach, English National Ballet choreographic workshop / Hanover Germany Choreography Competition
- 2010 – "The Weight of Love" Music by Stravinsky, world premier in Shanghai Expo Centre on 8 Sept, commissioned by English National Ballet in collaboration with Shanghai Ballet
- 2011 – "Vue de l'Autre" Music by Ludovico Einaudi. New ballet commissioned by English National Ballet, world premier in London Coliseum Theatre on 16 March
- 2011 – "Blackgold" Music by Armand Amar, English national ballet choreographic workshop
- 2011 – "Chase" Music by Armand Amar, world premier on 11th sept 2011 at Britten Theatre, London

== Dance repertoire ==
- Arlesienne, choreography by Roland Petit
- Alice in Wonderland, choreography by Derek Dean (Cat, Gryphon, Caterpillar)
- Aunnis, choreography by Jaques Garnier
- Acte, choreography by R. Seyfried
- Carmen, choreography by Roland Petit
- Cinderella, choreography by Michael Corder (Dancing Master, Princes friends, Spring)
- Concerto Violin, choreography by George Balanchine
- Concerto for Five, choreography V. Le Ngoc
- Coppellia, choreography by R. Hynd
- Dove la lune, choreography by J. Christophe Maillot
- Esplanade, choreography by Paul Taylor
- Etudes, choreography by H. Lander
- Fire Bird, choreography by Maurice Béjart
- Fleure d’autaune, choreography by M.C. Pietragalla
- Flower Festival, choreography by A. Bournonville
- Giselle, choreography by M.S keaping (peasant pas de 2)
- J’ai trouve l’idee plaisante, choreography by J.P. Aviotte
- La Sylphide, choreography by A. Bournonville (pas de 2)
- Les Emigrants, choreography by C. Brumachon
- Les Indomptes, choreography by C. Brumachon
- Melody on the Move, choreography by M. Corder
- Manon, choreography by MacMilan
- Men Y Men, choreography by W. Eagling
- Paquita, choreography by M.C. Pietragalla
- Perpertum Mobile, choreography by C. Hampson
- Raymonda, choreography by M.C. Pietragalla
- Resolution, choreography by W. Eagling (pas de 3)
- Romeo & Juliet, choreography by R. Nureyev
- Romeo & Juliet, choreography by V. Danzig
- Rubbies, choreography by George Balanchine
- Sakountala, choreography by M.C. Pietragalla
- Sans Mobile Apparent, choreography M. Naisy
- Scheherazade, choreography by M. Fokine
- Sinfonietta, choreography by C. Hampson
- Snow Queen, choreography by M. Corder (Reindeer, one of 4 male sprites)
- Stelt, choreography by Richard Wherlock
- Strictly Gershwin, choreography by D. Dean
- Suite en Blanc, choreography by Serge Lifar
- Swan Lake, choreography by D. Dean
- The Canterville Ghost, choreography by W. Turker
- The four temperaments, choreography by George Balanchine (phlegmatic)
- The Nutcracker, choreography by C. Hampson
- The Nutcracker, choreography by W. Eagling
- The Sleeping Beauty, choreography by K. Macmilan (Gold, Blue Bird, Cat)
- The Rite of Spring, choreography by K. Macmilan
- The Weight of Love, choreography V. Le Ngoc
- Tzigan, choreography by George Balanchine
- Vita, choreography by Marie-Claude Pietragalla
- Vue de l’autre, choreography V. Le Ngoc
- Who Cares?, choreography by George Balanchine.
