= EunWon Lee =

South Korean ballet dancer

- Born: Seoul, South Korea
- Education: Korea National University of Arts
- Occupation: Ballet dancer
- Years active: 2010 – Present
- Career
- Current group: The Washington Ballet
- Former groups: Korea National Ballet

Korean name
- Hangul: 이은원
- RR: I Eunwon
- MR: I Ŭnwŏn
- Website: www.eunwon-lee.com

EunWon Lee is a South Korean ballet dancer. She was a former principal dancer with the Korea National Ballet and currently dances with The Washington Ballet.

== Early life and education ==
Lee was born and raised in South Korea. She discovered ballet at the age of seven, after attending a performance of The Nutcracker with her parents. She enrolled in ballet classes and later became a student at the Korea National Institute for the Gifted in Arts, a competitive arts middle school, and at Ye Won Art School. She skipped high school and entered university at the age of sixteen. Lee received a Bachelor of Fine Arts degree from Korea National University of Arts in Seoul.

== Career ==
Lee joined the Korea National Ballet as an apprentice in 2010. She injured her knee when she was eighteen years old and had to take time off from the company. She was promoted to principal dancer at the age of twenty-one in 2012, making her the youngest principal dancer at the Korea National Ballet. She was a principal dancer for six years. As a principal, Lee became a celebrity in South Korea, even throwing the first pitch at a professional baseball game. She danced the role of Katherina in John Cranko's Taming of the Shrew as her last performance with Korea National Ballet. In 2016 she moved to the United States and joined The Washington Ballet under the new artistic leadership of Julie Kent. Her debut with The Washington Ballet was in the ballet Giselle.

She has danced the leading roles in Romeo and Juliet, The Taming of the Shrew, Giselle, Swan Lake, Don Quixote, La Bayadère, Spartacus, Raymonda, L'Arlésienne, The Nutcracker, The Seventh Symphony, The Sleeping Beauty, Prince Ho Dong, Holberg Pas de deux, Tchaikovsky and Poise.

== Awards ==
- Prima Ballerina Award – Korean Ballet Association (2014, South Korea)
- New Artist Award – Korean Ballet Association (2013, South Korea)
- Senior Silver Medal & Prima Ballerina Award – Korean Ballet Association (2011, South Korea)
- Junior Bronze Medal – Varna Ballet Competition (2008, Bulgaria)
- Junior Silver Medal – Shanghai Ballet Competition (2007, China)
- Grand Prix, Junior Gold Medal – Seoul International Ballet Competition (2006, South Korea)
- Elegance Award – Vaganova Prix International Competition (2006, Russia)
