= Ballet company =

Dance troupe

A ballet company is a type of dance troupe that performs classical ballet, neoclassical ballet, and/or contemporary ballet in the European tradition, plus managerial and support staff. Most major ballet companies employ dancers on a year-round basis, except in the United States, where contracts for part of the year (typically thirty or forty weeks) are normally offered. A company generally has a home theatre where it stages the majority of its performances, but many companies also tour in their home country or internationally.

Ballet companies routinely make a loss at the box office and depend on external financial support of one kind or another. In Europe, most of this support comes in the form of government subsidies, though private donations are usually solicited as well. In North America, private donations are the main source of external funding.

Many ballet companies have an associated school which trains dancers. Traditionally the school would provide almost all of the company's dancers, something which helped to create clear distinctions in style between companies, but 21st-century ballet has open hiring practices, and many ballet companies have a very international staff.

== Staff ==
The head of a ballet company is called the artistic director. They are usually a retired dancer, and often they choreograph some of the company's productions themselves. In a large company, they will have one or more assistants. Day-to-day coaching of the dancers is the responsibility of one or more ballet masters and ballet mistresses. Some companies also employ répétiteurs and dance notators. There is often a resident choreographer.

All but the smallest companies divide their dancers into at least three grades. The most common names for the two higher grades in English are principal and soloist and the junior dancers form the corps de ballet. Some companies (especially in North America) have trainees or apprentices, who rank below the corps de ballet and may be unpaid. Some companies further subdivide these grades, and the terminology used varies from company to company. In the 19th century and early to mid-20th century the top female dancer was often recognized as the prima ballerina, but this practice has ceased. Male and female dancers were historically split into separate hierarchies (for more information see ballerina). Today, many companies choose to use a gender-neutral hierarchy. Some companies (mainly in Russia and countries strongly influenced by Russian ballet) employ specialist character dancers: unlike ballerinas female character dancers do not dance en pointe. The largest ballet company in the world is the Bolshoi Ballet of Moscow, which employs over 240 dancers, as of 2010. The largest companies in Western Europe and North America employ around one hundred.

Many companies have a music director, generally a conductor by profession, though this is often a part-time position. The music director has a lower status in ballet than they have in opera, where they are the head of the company. Freelance conductors are hired to conduct specific productions as and when required. Large companies have their own orchestra, which is often shared with an opera company resident in the same theatre or opera house. Smaller companies hire a local orchestra on a contract basis for each season of performances, or hire a scratch orchestra for specific performances, e.g. when they are on tour. During company classes and rehearsals, music is provided by one or more staff or freelance pianists.

All but the smallest companies have a separate administrative staff that deals with marketing, accounts, personnel issues, logistics and so on. Larger companies employ a permanent staff of craftsmen and craftswomen such as prop makers and costume makers, and technical staff such as lighting technicians and stage managers. Smaller companies hire freelancers for these roles as and when required. Some companies also have physiotherapists, masseurs, and physical trainers on the staff.

== Asian classical ballet traditions ==
The term "ballet" is sometimes used to refer to dance styles in any culture's classical tradition, mainly about classical styles of dance performed in parts of Asia. Classical Ramayana Hindu ballet is often performed in Indonesia. The Royal Ballet of Cambodia is an example of a ballet company in the Eastern tradition.

The companies listed below are ballet companies that perform according to the European tradition, although some international companies also perform contemporary ballets that merge Western and Eastern themes and dance techniques.

== Africa ==
Algeria

- Algerian National Ballet

Egypt

- Cairo Opera Ballet Company

Tunisia

- Tunisian National Ballet

South Africa

- Ballet Theatre Afrikan
- Bovim Ballet
- Cape Town City Ballet
- Joburg Ballet
- Pretoria Ballet
- South African Ballet Theatre

== Asia ==
Armenia

- Armenian National Opera and Ballet Theater

Azerbaijan

- Azerbaijan State Academic Opera and Ballet Theater

China

- Guangzhou Ballet
- Liaoning Ballet
- National Ballet of China
- Shanghai Ballet
- Suzhou Ballet
- Tianjin Ballet

Hong Kong

- Hong Kong Ballet

Indonesia

- Namarina

Iran

- Les Ballets Persans (Iranian National Ballet re-established in Sweden)

Israel

- Israel Ballet

Japan

- Asami Maki Ballet Tokyo
- Ballet Chambre Ouest
- Higaki Ballet Company
- Houmura Tomoi Ballet
- Iwaki Ballet Company
- Jinushi Kaoru Ballet Company
- K-ballet
- Matsuoka Reiko ballet
- Matsuyama Ballet
- NBA Ballet Company
- Noism
- Noma Ballet Company
- Noriko Kobayashi Ballet Theatre
- Ochi International Ballet
- Osaka Ballet Academy
- Sadamatsu Hamada Ballet
- Sasaki Michiko Ballet Studio
- Star Dancers Ballet
- Tani Momoko Ballet
- The Inoue Ballet Foundation
- The Matsuyama Ballet
- New National Theatre Tokyo
- Tokyo Ballet
- Tokyo City Ballet

Kazakhstan

- Aukhan Kazakh National Ballet Theatre

Mongolia

- Mongolian State Academic Theatre of Opera and Ballet

Philippines

- Ballet Manila
- Ballet Philippines
- Philippine Ballet Theatre

Singapore

- Singapore Dance Theatre

South Korea

- Busan Ballet Theatre
- Busan City Ballet
- Daegu City Ballet Company
- Etoile Ballet
- Gwangju City Ballet
- Hwaseong City Ballet
- Incheon City Ballet
- Jeonbuk Ballet Theatre
- KOR Ballet Company
- Korea Ballet Stars
- Korea National Ballet
- Lee Won Kook Ballet
- SEO Ballet
- Seongnam City Ballet
- Seoul Ballet
- Seoul Ballet Theatre
- Seoul City Ballet
- Suwon City Ballet
- Universal Ballet
- Wise Ballet

Taiwan

- Taiwan Ballet Company
- Capital Ballet Taipei
- Formosa Ballet
- Kaohsiung City Ballet

Thailand

- Royal Thai Ballet

Uzbekistan

- Alisher Navoi Opera and Ballet Theatre

== Europe ==
Austria

- Vienna State Ballet
- Graz Opera Ballet
- Salzburg Ballet

Belarus

- National Ballet Theatre of Belarus

Belgium

- Charleroi Danses
- Royal Ballet of Flanders

Bulgaria

- National Opera and Ballet

Croatia

- Croatian National Theatre Ballet

Czech Republic

- National Theatre Ballet (Prague)
- Prague State Opera Ballet

Denmark

- Royal Danish Ballet

Estonia

- Estonian National Opera Ballet
- Vanemuine Theatre

Finland

- Finnish National Ballet

France

- Paris Opera Ballet
- Ballet du Capitole (Toulouse)
- Ballet de Lorraine
- Ballet de l'Opéra national du Rhin (Mulhouse)
- Ballet de l'Opéra National de Bordeaux
- Ballet National de Marseille
- Lyon Opera Ballet
- Marseille Opera Ballet
- Malandain Ballet Biarritz

Greece

- Greek National Opera

Germany

- Badisches Staatstheater Karlsruhe
- Ballet am Rhein (Düsseldorf & Duisburg)
- Bavarian State Ballet, from 1988: Bayerisches Staatsballett
- Berlin State Ballet
- Dresden Semperoper Ballet
- Frankfurt Ballet
- Hamburg Ballet
- Leipzig Ballet
- Stuttgart Ballet
- Ballett Dortmund

Hungary

- Hungarian National Ballet
- Pécsi Ballet
- Győri Ballet
- Sopron Ballet

Ireland

- Monica Loughman Ballet
- Ballet Ireland

Italy

- Aterballetto (Reggio-Emilia, Emilia-Romagna)
- La Scala Theatre Ballet
- Rome Ballet
- Teatro Nuovo Torino
- Tuscany Ballet (Florence)
- Compagnia di Balletto del Teatro San Carlo

Kosovo

- Kosovo Ballet

Latvia

- Latvian National Opera Ballet

Lithuania

- Lithuanian National Opera and Ballet

Moldova

- Moldova National Opera Ballet

Monaco

- Les Ballets de Monte Carlo

Netherlands

- Dutch National Ballet

Norway

- Norwegian National Ballet

Poland

- Krakow Opera Ballet
- Polish National Ballet
- Poznan Opera Ballet
- Wroclaw Opera Ballet

Portugal

- Centro de Dança do Porto
- National Ballet of Portugal - CNB
- Quorum Ballet

Romania

- Romanian National Opera Ballet
- Cluj-Napoca Romanian Opera Ballet

Russia

- Kremlin Ballet Theatre
- Ballets Russes
- Bolshoi Ballet
- Eifman Ballet
- Kirov Ballet / Mariinsky Ballet
- Moscow Ballet, various companies
- Mikhaylovsky Theatre
- Novosibirsk Opera and Ballet Theatre
- St Petersburg Ballet Theatre - Konstantin Tashkin

Serbia

- Serbian National Ballet

Slovak

- Slovak National Theatre Ballet

Slovenia

- Slovenian National Ballet

Spain

- Ballet Nacional de España
- Barcelona Ballet
- Compañía Nacional de Danza
- Madrid Ballet

Sweden

- Gothenburg Opera Ballet
- Royal Swedish Ballet

Switzerland

- Basel Ballet
- Geneva Ballet
- Lucerne Dance Theatre
- Zurich Ballet

Turkey

- Istanbul State Ballet

United Kingdom

- Ballet Black
- Birmingham Royal Ballet
- English National Ballet
- Northern Ballet
- The Royal Ballet
- Scottish Ballet
- International London City Ballet

Ukraine

- Donetsk Ballet
- Grand Kyiv Ballet
- Lviv Theatre of Opera and Ballet
- Kyiv City Ballet
- Kyiv Modern-Ballet
- National Ballet of Ukraine
- Odesa Opera and Ballet Theatre

== Oceania ==
Australia

- The Australian Ballet
- Ballet Theatre of Queensland
- Melbourne Ballet Company
- Melbourne City Ballet
- Queensland Ballet
- West Australian Ballet

New Zealand

- The Royal New Zealand Ballet

== North America ==
Canada

- Les Grands Ballets Canadiens de Montréal
- Alberta Ballet
- Ballet BC
- National Ballet of Canada
- Royal Winnipeg Ballet

Cuba

- Cuban National Ballet

Dominican Republic

- Ballet Clasico Nacional de Santo Domingo

Mexico

- Ballet de Monterrey
- National Company of Ballet

Puerto Rico

- National Ballet Theater of Puerto Rico
- Western Ballet Theater of Puerto Rico

United States

== South America ==
Argentina

- Ballet Argentino
- Colon Theater Ballet

Brazil

- São Paulo Companhia de Dança
- Theatro Municipal do Rio de Janeiro

Chile

- Chilean National Ballet

Colombia

- Incolballet

Peru

- Ballet Municipal de Lima

Uruguay

- National Ballet of Uruguay

== See also ==
- List of dance companies
