= Gwangju City Ballet =

South Korean ballet company

The Gwangju City Ballet (Hangul: 광주 시립발레단) was founded in Gwangju, South Korea in 1976. As one of only five professional ballet companies in South Korea, the company performs a repertoire which includes many full-length narrative ballets such as Swan Lake, The Nutcracker, The Sleeping Beauty, La Sylphide, Don Quixote, Coppelia, and so on. The company has continuously been supported by Gwangju Metropolitan City, the sixth-largest city in South Korea.

== Artistic director ==
Choi Tae-ji was born in 1959, in Kyoto, Japan and performed as a ballerina there from 1968 to 1980. Her first performance for the Korea National Ballet was Scheherazade, in 1983.) She was appointed as the 6th artistic director of the Korea National Ballet in 2008. She became a regular member of the Korea National Ballet in 1987 and danced as prima ballerina until 1992. She acted as member of the direction committee from 1993 to 1995 and worked as the third head and artistic director of the Korea National Ballet from 1996 to 2001. She created "Ballet with Commentary" (a new program), and collaborated on a work with world artists such as Yuri Grigorovich and Jean-Christophe Maillot. Choi Tae-ji was newly appointed in 2017 as head and artistic director of the Gwangju City Ballet from 2017 to the present.

== Location ==
Gwangju City Ballet has been acting mainly at Gwangju Culture & Art Center, at Bukdaemun-ro 60, Buk-gu, Gwangju Metropolitan City, South Korea. ""

== Motto ==
Beautiful Daily Life & Dance Festival for Gwangju citizens

== Performances ==
Gwangju City Ballet company was founded in Gwangju Metropolitan City in October, 1976 as a professional ballet company. "" ""

Outside of Korea, it has performed at Chicago Center East Theater of the United States, Fukuoka Momoch Place Theater of Japan, San Francisco Herbst Theater of the United States, San Jose Flint Center of the United States, Celestral Bridge Theater of China, Guangzhou Opera House of China, etc. ""
