= Jakes Abeberry =

French lawyer and politician (1930–2022)

Member of the Municipal Council of Biarritz
- In office 1983–2014

Personal details
- Born: Jacques Abeberry; 25 April 1930 Biarritz, France
- Died: 29 November 2022 (aged 92)
- Party: Enbata
- Occupation: Banking executive

Jacques Abeberry (25 April 1930 – 29 November 2022) was a French politician, banking executive, and a member of the Abertzale movement in the French Basque Country.

== Biography ==
Abeberry was born in Biarritz on 25 April 1930. He was the son of baker Jean Abeberry and teacher Ernestine Etcheverry. He had four brothers: Albert, Pierre, Maurice, and Jean-Claude. At the age of 16, he became a singer and dancer with Oldarra, of which he became artistic director in 1953 and president in 1973. He became director of the weekly newspaper Enbata, of which he had been an editorialist since 1968. He was honorary president of "Biarritz autrement – Biarritz Bestelakoa", which he co-founded in 1989.

In 1983, Abeberry was elected to the municipal council of Biarritz, where he remained until 30 March 2014. In 1991, he became second deputy mayor, giving him the responsibility of promoting culture in Biarritz. He founded the dance festival Le Temps d'Aimer, which paved the way for a national choreographic center in 1998, known today as the Malandain Ballet Biarritz. He partnered with the Académie André-Marchal to create the Concours international d'orgue de la ville de Biarritz in 1993. That year, he also promoted the Orchestre d'harmonie de Biarritz.

Jakes Abeberry died on 29 November 2022, at the age of 92.

== Works ==
- Les Groupes folkloriques (1960)
- Tribune. Euzkadi eta Europa (1964)
- Où en est le projet des Rocailles ? Jakes Abeberry, 3e adjoint, nous présente le projet pour le quartier des Rocailles, autour de la future bibliothèque (1996)
- La politique culturelle à Biarritz / Biarritz culture (1997)
- Je défendrai la maison de mon père (1998)
- Nolako egitura politikoa ? (1998)
- La réunification d'Euskal Herria passe par l'Europe (1998)
- La Construction de l'eurorégion Euskal Herria (1999)
- Etxebeltzkeriak : 1975-1999 : 300 dessins d'Etxebeltz parus dans Enbata (1999)
- Luzaroan bizikide (2000)
- Bascotilles (2005)
- Guerre civile et nationalisme (2007)
- Oldarra. Une histoire, un esprit (2018)
