= Ji-young Kim =

South Korean prima ballerina (born 1978)

- 김지영
- Born: July 26, 1978 (age 47); Seoul, South Korea
- Occupation: Ballet dancer
- Awards: Hwagwan Order of Cultural Merit (1998)

Korean name
- Hangul: 김지영
- RR: Gim Jiyeong
- MR: Kim Chiyŏng

Ji-young Kim (Korean: 김지영; born July 26, 1978) is a South Korean prima ballerina and is currently a principal dancer with the Korea National Ballet (KNB) in Seoul, South Korea.

== Early years ==
Kim was born in Seoul, South Korea. She tried a number of hobbies while young, including Taekwondo and piano. She developed an interest in ballet and began taking ballet classes when she was ten years old.

== Dancing career ==
In 1991, when Kim was thirteen years old, she began training professionally at the Yewon School, a specialist arts junior school in Seoul. During vacation she attended season sessions for ballet in New York City. Later the same year, she had a chance to train with professors of the Vaganova Academy and Kim decided to study at the Vaganova. In 1992, Kim went to Russia and she passed the entrance exam for the school. Kim entered the Vaganova Academy of Russian Ballet. In 1996, Kim performed in Vaganova's graduation performance. While she planned to join the company in Russia after her graduation, Kim withdrew her plans and returned to Seoul when her mother died suddenly from a heart attack during Kim's graduation performance. Five months later, Kim joined the Korea National Ballet (KNB) as the youngest principal dancer. She made her stage debut, dancing the role of Esmeralda in Notre Dame de Paris.

Kim has won awards in top ballet competitions: in 1998 she won the bronze medal in the 6th USA International Ballet Competition in Jackson, Mississippi, United States. In the same year, she won the First Prize in the 8th Paris International Dance Competition (Le Concours international de danse de Paris) in France, with her partner, Yong-geol Kim. In 1999, after winning the competition, the couple received the Order of Culture Merit: Hwagwan from The Republic of Korea; Kim was the youngest recipient. In 2001 she won the silver medal and best art prize in Kazan International Ballet Competition in Tatarstan, Russia and Prima Ballerina Award from Ballet Association in South Korea.

In 1999, Kim resigned from the Korea National Ballet and applied to and auditioned for several ballet companies in Europe. She joined Dutch National Ballet in 2002 as a Grand sujet after an offer from the Artistic Director Wayne Eagling of the Dutch National Ballet (Het National Ballet). Kim was promoted to soloist in 2005. In 2007, Kim was promoted to principal and awarded the Alexandra Radius Prize, an incentive prize for young and upcoming talent, from the ballet company. After an invitation from Balletto di Teatro dell'Opera di Roma (Rome Opera ballet), Italy, Kim made her debut as Odette/Odile in Swan Lake. In 2009, Kim rejoined Korea National Ballet but remained in Dutch National Ballet as guest principal dancer.

In 2010, Kim danced the première of Don Quixote as Kitri, with choreography by Alexei Ratmansky, with Dutch National Ballet. Her performance lead to another invitation from Balletto di Teatro dell'Opera di Roma to dance as Kitri in Don Quixote. Subsequently, Kim made her debut with the Bolshoi Ballet with KNB, dancing the roles of Juliet in Romeo and Juliet and Raymonda in Raymonda for the 20th anniversary of Korea-Russia bilateral relations. In April 2011, Kim performed in the Latin dance project "Latin Innovation". In May, she performed in Sicily, Italy, making her debut as Cinderella in Cinderella with the Teatro Massimo Ballet company. In October 2011, Korea National Ballet was invited as the opener for San Carlo Dance Festival. KNB performed the première of Prince Hodong and Kim danced the main role, Princess Nakrang, at Teatro di San Carlo (San Carlo Theater) in Naples, Italy.

In 2014, Kim performed in "Two in Two", a collaboration with her rival from the KNB, Kim Joo-won, which incorporates tango, flamenco, ballet and contemporary dance. The two principal ballerinas had shared the role of princess Nakrang in the KNB show "Prince Hodong" in 2011 at the Teatro di San Carlo in Naples, Italy.

Following years of performances with the KNB, she announced her departure from it in summer 2019. Her last performance with the KNB was Giselle at the Seoul Arts Center following which she became a professor of dance at the Kyung Hee University.

== Style ==
Kim has been described a versatile ballerina, with a mix of academic technique and expressionistic style characterized by sharp lines. Her performances in classics like Swan Lake, Giselle and La Bayadère, have been noted. Kim's musicality allows her to perform neoclassical and contemporary ballets, like Tchaikovsky's Pas de Deux. Her performance as Kitri in Don Quixote has been noted because of her technique and acting.

== List of ballets performed / roles performed ==
With the Korea National Ballet

- Juliet in Romeo and Juliet
- Giselle in Giselle
- Odette/Odile in Swan Lake
- Raymonda in Raymonda
- Cinderella in Cinderella
- Princess Aurora in The Sleeping Beauty
- Nikiya in La Bayadère
- Kitri in Don Quixote
- Clara/Marie/the Sugar Plum Fairy in The Nutcracker
- Phrigia in Spartacus
- Paquita in Paquita
- Medora in Le Corsaire
- Esmeralda in Notre Dame de Paris (La Esmeralda)
- Carmen in Carmen
- Princess Nakrang in Prince Hodong
- Diana in Diana and Acteon Pas de Deux
- Leading role in The Dying Swan
- Leading role in Tchaikovsky Pas de Deux
- Leading role in Grand Pas Classique

With Dutch National Ballet (Het National Ballet)

- Odette/Odile in Swan Lake
- Nikiya and Gamzatti in La Bayadère
- Princess Aurora in The Sleeping Beauty
- Kitri in Don Quixote
- Clara/the Sugar Plum Fairy in The Nutcracker
- Sylphide in La Sylphide
- Leading role in Jewels
- Leading role in Serenade
- Leading role in Pulcinella
- Leading role in Symphony in C
- Leading role in Frank Bridge Variations
- Leading role in the Tchaikovsky Pas de Deux
- Leading role in Five tangos
- Leading role in Black Cake
- Leading role in Four Sections

With the Balletto di Teatro dell'Opera di Roma (Rome Opera ballet)

- Odette/Odile in Swan Lake
- Kitri in Don Quixote

With Bolshoi Ballet

- Juliet in Romeo and Juliet
- Raymonda in Raymonda

With Teatro Massimo Ballet company

- Cinderella in Cinderella

== Awards ==
- The Bronze Medal in the 6th USA International Ballet Competition in Jackson, Mississippi, United States (1998)
- The First Prize in the 8th Paris International Ballet Competition (Le Concours international de danse de Paris) in Paris, France (1998)
- Order of Culture Merit: Hwagwan, The Republic of Korea (1999)
- The Silver Medal and best art prize in Kazan International Ballet Competition in Tatarstan, Russia (2001)
- Prima Ballerina Award, Ballet Association in South Korea (2001)
- The Alexandra Radius Prize, Dutch National Ballet (2007)
