= Buffalo Ballet Theater =

The Buffalo Ballet Theater is a Ballet company in Buffalo, New York, USA. It was founded by the dancer and choreographer Barry Leon. Bronislava Nijinska led the Buffalo Ballet Theater from 1967. Countless US-American dancers started their dancing career here.

== Principal Dancers ==
- Donna Armistead
- Robin Gilbert
- Heidi Halt
- Janet Murphy
- Moira Murphy
- Gregory Drotar
- Barry Leon

== Dancers ==
- Marvin Askew
- Amber Bosch
- Ani DiFranco
- Sarah Duax
- Sara Eppley
- Rebekah Fontane
- Sara Gelbaugh
- Heidi Halt
- Erinn Hughes
- Rebecca Jefferson
- Heidi Kregal
- Linda Merrill
- Melanie Nasser
- Libby Nord
- Noelle Partusch
- Kathy Pucci
- Maria Rodgers
- Christopher Smith
- Joel Sprague
- Joseph Puleo
- Janette Sullivan
- Katie Wakeford
- Paul Wegner
- Jessica Wolfrum

== Artistic Directors ==
- Gregory Drotar
- Barry Leon

== Choreographers ==
- Gregory Drotar
- Shelley Hain

== Teachers ==
- Patricia Farkas Sprague
- Linda Perez

== Pianists ==
- Doris Parsons
