= Giuffrida =

Giuffrida is an Italian surname. Notable people with the surname include:

- Alfio Giuffrida (born 1953), Italian sculptor
- Domenico Giuffrida (born 1954), Italian wrestler
- Giuseppe De Felice Giuffrida (1859–1920), Italian socialist politician and journalist
- Louis O. Giuffrida (1920–2012), first director of the Federal Emergency Management Agency from 1981 to 1985
- Odette Giuffrida (born 1994), Italian judoka

== See also ==
- Giuffrida metro station, located in Catania in Sicily, southern Italy
