= Kim Joo-won (dancer) =

South Korean prima ballerina (born 1977)

- Hangul: 김주원
- RR: Gim Juwon
- MR: Kim Chuwŏn

Kim Joo-won (Korean: 김주원; born 8 May 1977) is a South Korean prima ballerina who has danced for 15 years with the Korean National Ballet (KNB). In 2012, she curtailed her formal membership of the troupe to branch out on her own.

== Biography ==
Born in Busan, Kim began to study ballet when she was 12, completing her training at the Bolshoi Ballet School in 1998. The same year she joined the Korean National Ballet where she soon gained the distinction of prima ballerina. Kim has contributed significantly to Korean ballet taking leading roles in Giselle, Swan Lake, Don Quixote and Jean-Christophe Maillot's Romeo and Juliet. Between 1998 and 2012, Kim performed approximately 100 times a year, practicing three or four different programs at a time. Semi-nude photos of her in Vogue and a photographer's exhibition in 2007 were considered controversial.

Despite several offers from foreign troupes, she continued to dance with the company until 2012 when she branched out on her own, hoping to devote more of her time to musicals, pop art and fashion. After 15 years, she left the national ballet although she continues to dance with KNB as a guest principal dancer. Her first new assignment in June 2012 was to perform in Poise, a contemporary ballet production, followed in 2013 by her own production of Marguerite and Armand. In 2014, Kim performed in "Two in Two", a collaboration with her rival from the KNB, Ji-Young Kim, which incorporates tango, flamenco, ballet and contemporary dance. The two principal ballerinas had shared the role of princess Nakrang in the KNB show "Prince Hodong" in 2011 at the Teatro di San Carlo in Naples, Italy. During Vivaldi's Orlando finto pazzo production at the Korea National Opera in 2016, Kim did a cameo as princess Angelica. In that occasion she was asked by director Fabio Ceresa to dance a choreography in less than 1 square meter.

Of her various awards, she has been the recipient of the Rookie award from the Korean Dance Association (2001), bronze medallist at the Moscow International Ballet Competition (2001), and Prima Ballerina Award of the Korean Dance Association (2002). At the 2006 Benois de la Danse, Kim took the prize for top female dancer.
