= Moscow Ballet =

The name Moscow Ballet has commonly been applied to a number of different ballet companies, which include:

- Moscow Ballet (United States), a Russian ballet company. The Moscow Ballet tours annually in the United States with its Great Russian Nutcracker production.
- The Bolshoi Ballet, based in Moscow, Russia has often been referred to generically as "The Moscow Ballet".
- A "Moscow Ballet", founded in 1979, gained publicity in 1987 when a dancer, Andrei Ustinov, defected during the company’s first U.S. tour. Its artistic director is Vyacheslav Gordeyev, previously of the Bolshoi Ballet. Its 1987 tour was seen by an estimated 150,000 people.
