= Melbourne City Ballet =

Melbourne City Ballet was a ballet company based in Melbourne, Australia. The company was founded in 2013 by artistic director Michael Pappalardo and experienced significant growth throughout the years. Originally created as a neoclassical/contemporary project based company, Melbourne City Ballet developed quickly to become a full-time operating arts organisation with an increasing focus bring classical ballet works to regional and remote communities across Australia. Melbourne City Ballet was a registered charity with the Australian Charity & Not for Profit Commission under the name MCB Incorporated and was overseen by a board of professionals. MCB seized operations in July 2019 due to lack of funding.

== History ==
In 2013, Michael Pappalardo was frustrated with the limited amount of choreographic and career options available to professional classical ballet artists within Australia. Under the name "Melbourne City Ballet", he began to choreograph contemporary and neoclassical works with other professional artists (including principal artist Yuiko Masukawa) in a studio in Fitzroy for project based productions. The group performed in various events throughout the year including the 2013 Short+Sweet Festival (Consumption) and Melbourne Fringe Festival (Parallel Connections).

In 2014, the company commenced an extensive fundraising campaign to obtain their own ballet studios and in June moved into their first location named the Bardin Theatre on Glenlyon Road, Brunswick, Victoria. The venue featured one large studio close to the CBD, allowing the company to focus on developing works full time throughout the year. It was during this year that Melbourne City Ballet established an effective board to govern the company, known as MCB Incorporated, officially establishing not-for-profit status for the company. Melbourne City Ballet performed a full season within Melbourne consisting of D-Minor, double bill Consumption, showcase Placebo and a new adaption of Carmen. The company also toured to Sydney with their contemporary offering A Night with Melbourne City Ballet as special guests of the Sydney Fringe Festival. New training programs began to be offered by the company's artists, including the Melbourne City Youth Ballet and Junior Extension Program.

In 2015, Melbourne City Ballet offered their first pre-professional course known as Finishing Year, whose participants trained alongside the professional company artists throughout the year. The 2015 season calendar saw the company slowly move away from contemporary based ballet and more toward a neoclassical ballet offering. The program featured an adaption of the traditional Coppélia, contemporary showcase EXHALE, a new adaption of William Shakespeare's A Midsummer Night's Dream, children's ballet The Magic Toyshop, neoclassical season Piano Sessions and the tragic story of Romeo & Juliet. The company also embarked on a 12 venue tour of their 2014 work Carmen across New South Wales and Victoria. Melbourne City Ballet's artists were invited to perform an excerpt of A Midsummer Night's Dream at the Australian Dance Awards in Adelaide, South Australia.

In 2016, the company relocated from their single studio into a state of the art, custom built venue on Pentridge Boulevard, Coburg. The venue was officially opened by the Moreland City Council Mayor Samantha Ratnam and named the Melbourne City Ballet Centre. With the opening of the company's new facilities, Melbourne City Ballet opened their Elite Artist Program (full and part time training) to the public for the first time. The company's annual program consists of a new adaption of the Bournonville ballet Napoli, contemporary showcase PLAY/REWIND, the Peter Pan-inspired ballet Tink, the dark story of Dracula and the tragic Madam Butterfly. Melbourne City Ballet also embarked on an extensive tour of their 2015 production of Romeo & Juliet across regional/remote Queensland, Northern Territory, New South Wales and Victoria. The tour was funded in part through Playing Queensland.

In September 2016, Melbourne City Ballet released their 2017 annual season "In Motion", in which the company began to focus on developing classical ballet further within regional and remote communities. Productions announced include Don Quixote, ECHO, Once Upon A Time, A Midsummer Night's Dream, The Wonderful Wizard of Oz and The Nutcracker. The tour for the year included over 50 regional venues across four productions, supported by Creative Victoria and Arts Queensland.

Seasons for 2018 were announced as Sleeping Beauty (touring Victorian venues), Carmen (national tour), Madame Butterfly (national tour), Peter and the Wolf (children's tour - VIC & NSW) and The Nutcracker (Victoria only).

== Closure ==
The company was based at the Melbourne City Ballet Centre, within the grounds of the old Pentridge Prison in Coburg, Victoria. The venue featured five sprung studios (with work on a final studio to commence in late 2017) and an onsite Creative Department (Costumes, Sets & Props).

Melbourne City Ballet managed jointly by the company's Artistic Director and executive director. The organisation continued to receive limited local and state based government funding with other funds obtained through training courses, box office sales, presenter fees and corporate sponsorships.

On 26 June 2019, the company's dancers were informed by artistic director Michael Pappalardo that the company would not be able to continue.

== Company ==
As of January 2018, the company consists of the following:

- Artistic Director - Michael Pappalardo
- Executive Director - Sean Memery
- Principal Artists - Yuiko Masukawa, Brendan Bradshaw
- Solo Artists - Tynan Wood
- Company Artists - Kealy Fouracre, Emma Cheeseman, Yuma Yasui, Ariana Hond, Andrew Radak, Isabella Gemmell-Morgan, Charlotte Price, Audra Tory, Danielle Whitfort
- Junior Artists - Alexandra Rolfe, Henry Driver, Alexia Cannizarro, Olivia Johnstone
- Emerging Artists - Klarissa Gennusa, Jemima Vaya, Souji Shinse, Bronte Capone, Tamara Taylor, Charlotte Gleeson, Eleanor Gleeson, Sophia Maher, Siobhan Orgles, Amy Preddy

== Repertoire ==
The company's classical ballet repertoire includesthe following productions:

- Coppélia (Michael Pappalardo)
- Tink (Michael Pappalardo)
- Dracula (Brendan Bradshaw)
- A Midsummer Night's Dream (Michael Pappalardo)
- Romeo & Juliet (Michael Pappalardo)
- The Nutcracker (Yuiko Masukawa)
- Carmen (Michael Pappalardo)
- The Magic Toyshop (Yuiko Masukawa)
- Madame Butterfly (Michael Pappalardo)
- The Wonderful Wizard of Oz (Michael Pappalardo)
- Don Quixote (Michael Pappalardo)
- The Nutcracker (Michael Pappalardo)

The company also features an extensive repertoire of contemporary works including:

- Signal (Yuiko Masukawa)
- Arachnid (Michael Pappalardo)
- [inner] (Brendan Bradshaw)
- Consumption (Michael Pappalardo)
- Caruso (Brendan Bradshaw)
- Four Seasons (Michael Pappalardo)
- Quantum (Michael Pappalardo)
- 8-bit (Yuiko Masukawa)

== Training programs ==
Melbourne City Ballets offer a number of training programs to assist young artists moving toward careers as classical ballet artists. These courses include:

- Finishing Year Program (Pre-Professional Bridging Program)
- Elite Artist Program (Full Time Training)
- Melbourne Institute of Classical Arts (Part Time Ballet & Secondary Education)
- Melbourne City Youth Ballet (Youth Performance Company)
- Junior Extension Program (Technical Delivery Youth Program)
- Junior Elite Interstate Program (JEAP)
