= Petru Guelfucci =

French singer (1955–2021)

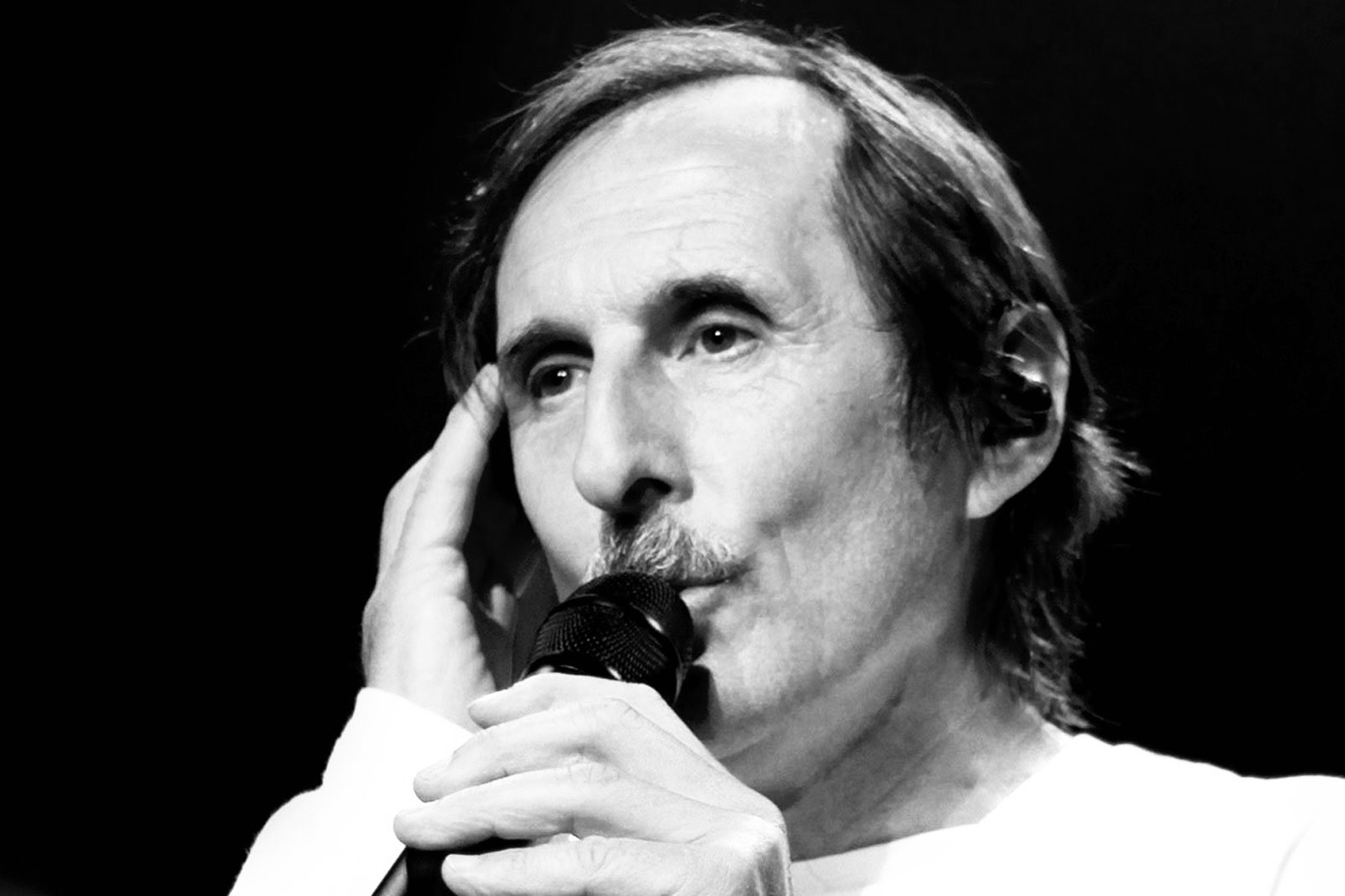
- Born: Petru-Santu Guelfucci; March 6, 1955; Sermano, Corsica, France
- Died: 8 October 2021 (aged 66); Marseille, France
- Known for: Folk singer
- Notable work: Corsica (1991)
- Awards: Canadian Disque d'Or

Petru Guelfucci (born 6 March 1955 in Sermano and died on 8 October 2021 at Marseille) was a Corsican singer. He is widely recognized as one of the most important and famous Corsican polyphonic singers during his solo career as much as in the time he spent as a member of Canta U Populu Corsu.

== Biography ==
Petru Guelfucci was an iconic figure of Corsican folk music with his most popular song Corsica which even was rewarded outer-atlantic in the Canadian Disque D'Or ceremony.

Born from a musician father, Guelfucci started showing his interest in music as a child and even started animating small concerts throughout Corsica at age 14.

=== Career ===
His career begin in the 1970s, a particularly tense decade in Corsica during which the people started actively protesting against the restrictions imposed on the Corsican language by the French government, and he joined Canta U Populu Corsu, a nationalist band singing exclusively in Corsican, in 1973. He leaves the band in 1981 and after a 6-year break, began a solo career with his first hit single Isula Idea which will not only reveal his voice to Corsica but also, surprisingly, to Quebec, the French-speaking province of Canada which also marks the peak of his international career which will grant him various awards. But his most popular work of art stays Corsica, a song he released in 1991 and that made him the symbol of Corsican culture and music.
