= Jochen Ulrich =

German choreographer and dancer (1944–2012)

Jochen Ulrich (3 August 1944 – 10 November 2012) was a German choreographer and dancer.

== About ==
Ulrich was born in Osterode am Harz. After studying at the Cologne Institute for Stage Dance from 1964 to 1967, Ulrich made his debut as a dancer at the Cologne Opera in 1967. By 1970, his choreographic works were already attracting national attention. In 1971, together with Helmut Baumann, Jürg Burth and Gray Veredon, he co-founded the Cologne Dance Forum and directed it from 1979. There, he fostered a number of young talented dancers from all over Europe, including the later choreographer Richard Wherlock.

In 1970, he won the Berliner Kritikerpreis.

From 2000, Ulrich was director of ballet at the Tyrolean State Theatre in Innsbruck. There he created the ballet Caravaggio, which described the life and work of the Italian painter. Intendant Rainer Mennicken brought him to Linz in 2006, where he achieved great success among others with Dennis Russell Davies and the Bruckner Orchester Linz.

His style distinguished itself in athletic-technical extensions of the dance impulses.

In November 2012 he died in Linz at the age of 68 after a long illness.
