= Alfio Giuffrida =

Italian painter (born 1953)

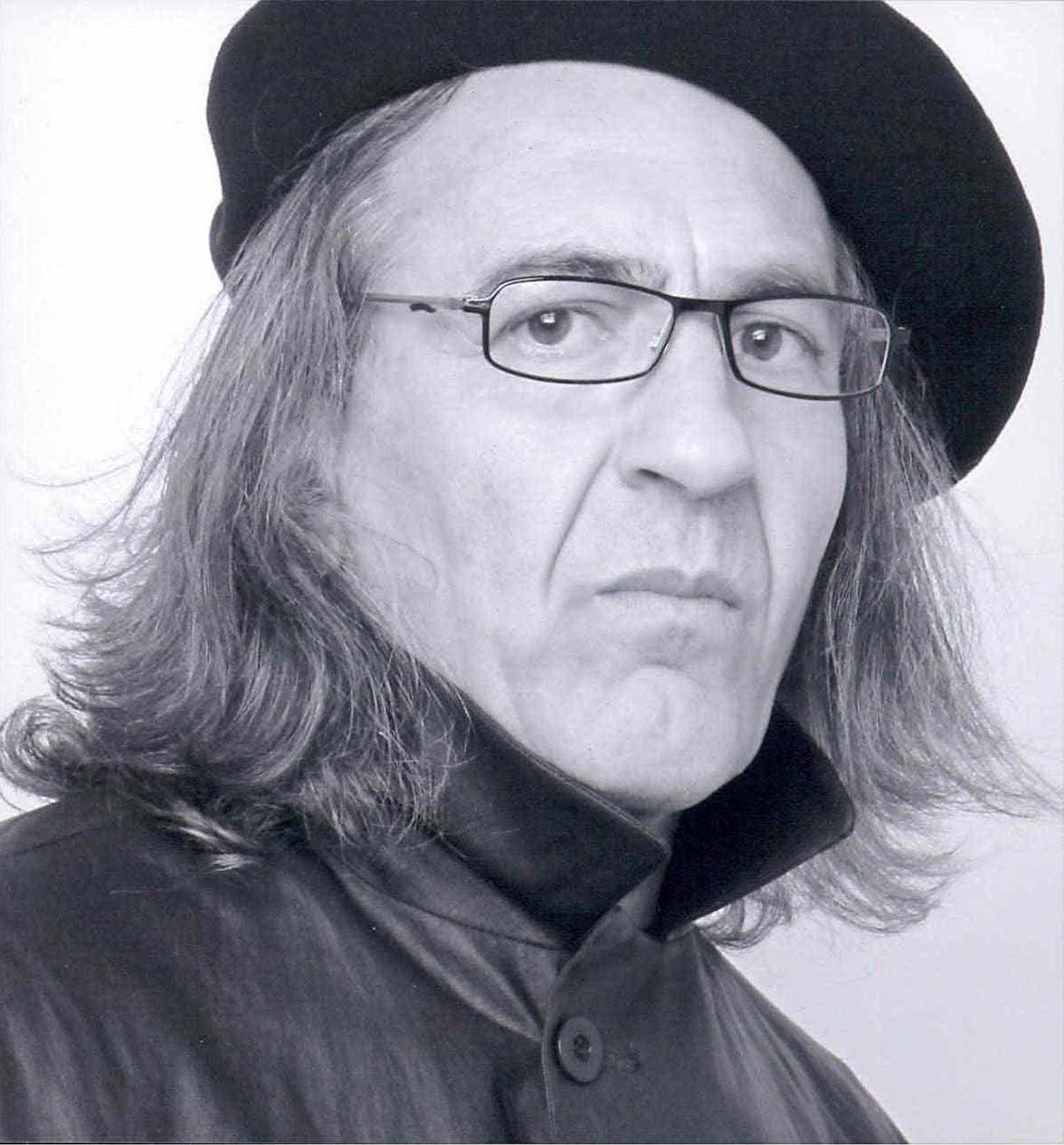
- Alfio Giuffrida (2008)
- Born: 28 January 1953; Zafferana Etnea, Italy
- Education: Accademia di Belle Arti di Roma
- Known for: Painting, sculpture, scenography
- Website: AG Sinnwerke

Alfio Giuffrida (born 28 January 1953 in Zafferana Etnea), also known as Alfio Giuffrida AG Sinnwerke, is a contemporary Italian sculptor, installation artist, set designer and painter.

== Life and education ==
Giuffrida was born in Zafferana Etnea, Sicily, in 1953. Between 1969 and 1972, he studied at the Scuola statale d'arte, Catania. In 1973, he moved to Rome to attend the Academy of Fine Arts, where he earned a diploma in set design. Between 1977 and 1985, he worked as a freelance painter and set designer in Rome; he moved to Cologne in 1986. From 1990 to 2004, he worked in his studio in Bonn, and has been living in Cologne again ever since.

== Works ==
ELEMENT LVIII-Animation, 2003

In 1975 Giuffrida participated in the X Rome Quadriennale. After moving to Germany, he began working as a set designer with the choreographer Jochen Ulrich in 1995—first with the Cologne Tanz-Forum and later with various other ensembles.

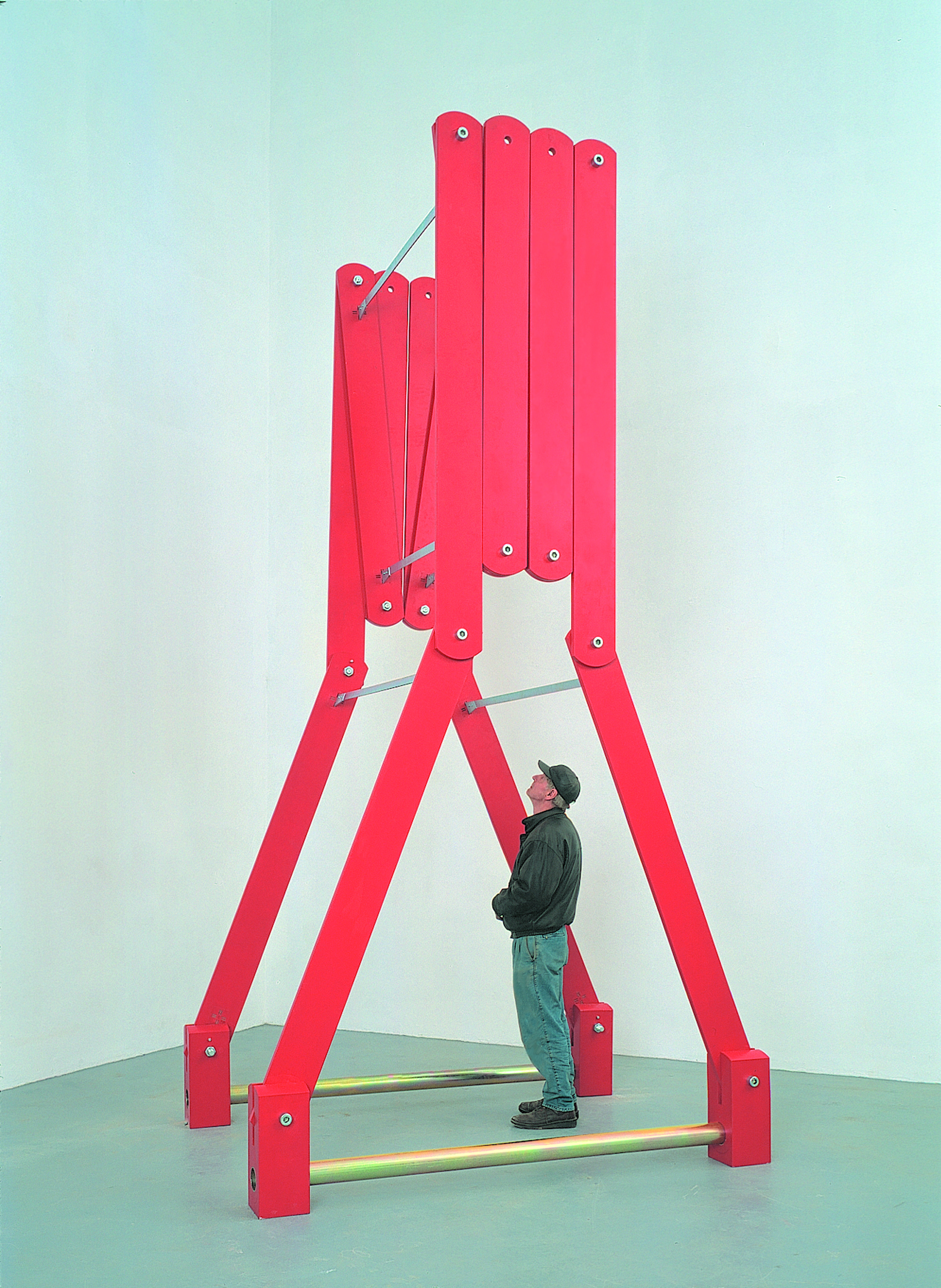
ELEMENT LVIII-Einstellung 11, 1997/98

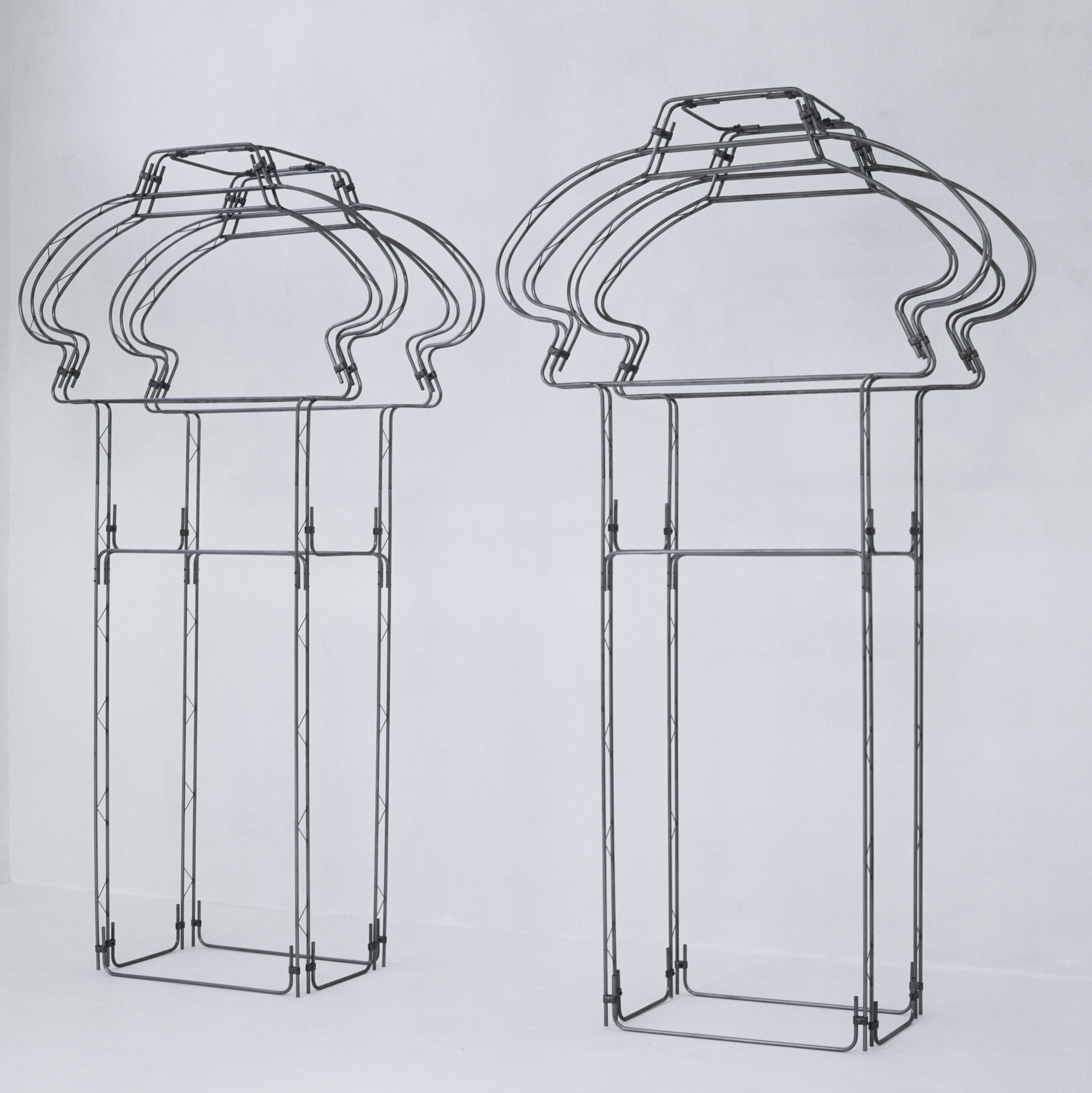
B-731 R, 1996/97

In 2003, he founded the fictional company A.G. Sinnwerke®, a brand and artistic project conceived as a "conceptual factory" for the production of serial cycles of works. In the 1990s, he initially created reliefs from fragments of furniture; later, he mostly produced large-scale, movable sculptures that simulate industrial mass-produced items. Some of these are movable and can be walked through. His installations also include references to mass-produced objects, such as antennas or high-voltage pylons, as well as CD cases.

== Selected exhibitions ==
- February/April 2001 Suermondt-Ludwig-Museum Aachen
- April/June 2001 Stadtmuseum Siegburg (Installationen)
- July/August 2004 Mannheimer Kunstverein.
- September/December 2006 Märkisches Museum Witten (Kinderwagen & andere Kunststücke)
- March/June 2007 Stadtmuseum Bergkamen

=== Group exhibitions ===
- March/April 1975, X Quadrennial of Rome (The new generation)
- June/October 2017, The Hot Wire (A collaboration between Skulptur Projekte Münster and Skulpturenmuseum Glaskasten Marl)

== Stage design ==
- Notebook, Premiere, 2 May 1995, Oper der Stadt Köln
- Die Verlobung in St. Domingo, 17 June 1995, Schlosserei Schauspiel Köln
- Goya-Danzas negras, 20 December 1995, Oper der Stadt Köln
- Get up Early, 22 February 1996, Internationales Tanzfestival Wien
- Citizen Kane, 4 April 1997, Oper der Stadt Köln
- Diaghilew – Die Offenbarung, 10 January 1999, Tiroler Landestheater Innsbruck
- Lorca y Dalí-Perros de Luna, 19 February 1999, Stadsschouwburg Heerlen (NL)
- Mon Orphée, 1 April 2000, Ludwig Forum für Internationale Kunst, Aachen
- Phädra, 30 November 2000, Deutsche Oper am Rhein, Düsseldorf
- Romeo und Julia, 20 January 2001, Tiroler Landestheater Innsbruck
- Casanova, 10 November 2001, Tiroler Landestheater Innsbruck
- Diaghilew – Die Favoriten, 8 November 2003, Aalto Theater Essen
- Caravaggio, 22 November 2003, Tiroler Landestheater Innsbruck
- Sissi – Kaiserliche Hoheit, 22 October 2005, Tiroler Landestheater Innsbruck

== Bibliography ==
- Künstler in Köln 1990, Köln 1989. M. Haas
- A. Tolnay (Ed.), Grafische Sammlung der Stadt Esslingen am Neckar, Bestands-Kat. II, Esslingen 1991
- B. Colarossi (Ed.), Quadriennale d'arte di Roma, Inv. Dell′arch., Rome 2000, ISBN 8876211276
- Ulrich Schneider, Gert Fischer: Suermondt Ludwig Museum Aachen
- Stadtmuseum Siegburg (Hrsg.): Giuffrida, Aachen/Siegburg 2001, ISBN 3-00-007525-9.
- Martin Stather: A.G. Sinnwerke
- Mannheimer Kunstverein (Hrsg.): A.G. Sinnwerke Giuffrida CDs, Bonn 2004, ISBN 3-00-014058-1.
- Nele Lipp, Uwe Rüth: Skulpturenmuseum Glaskasten Marl (Hrsg.): Körper – Leib – Raum: Der Raum im zeitgenössischen Tanz und in der zeitgenössischen Plastik, Marl 2006, ISBN 3-924790-73-6.

== Gallery ==
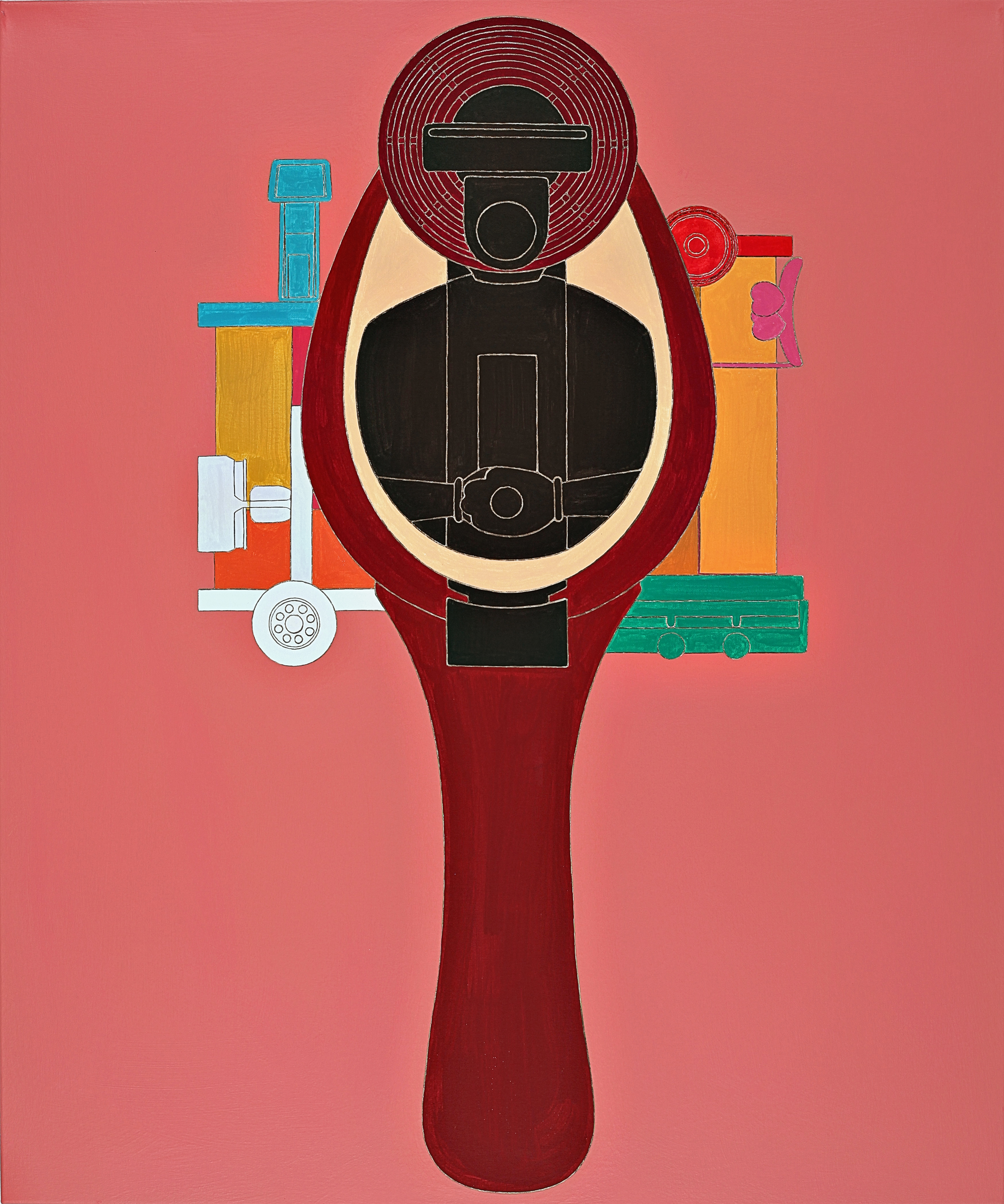
Spiegel-exp9, 2009

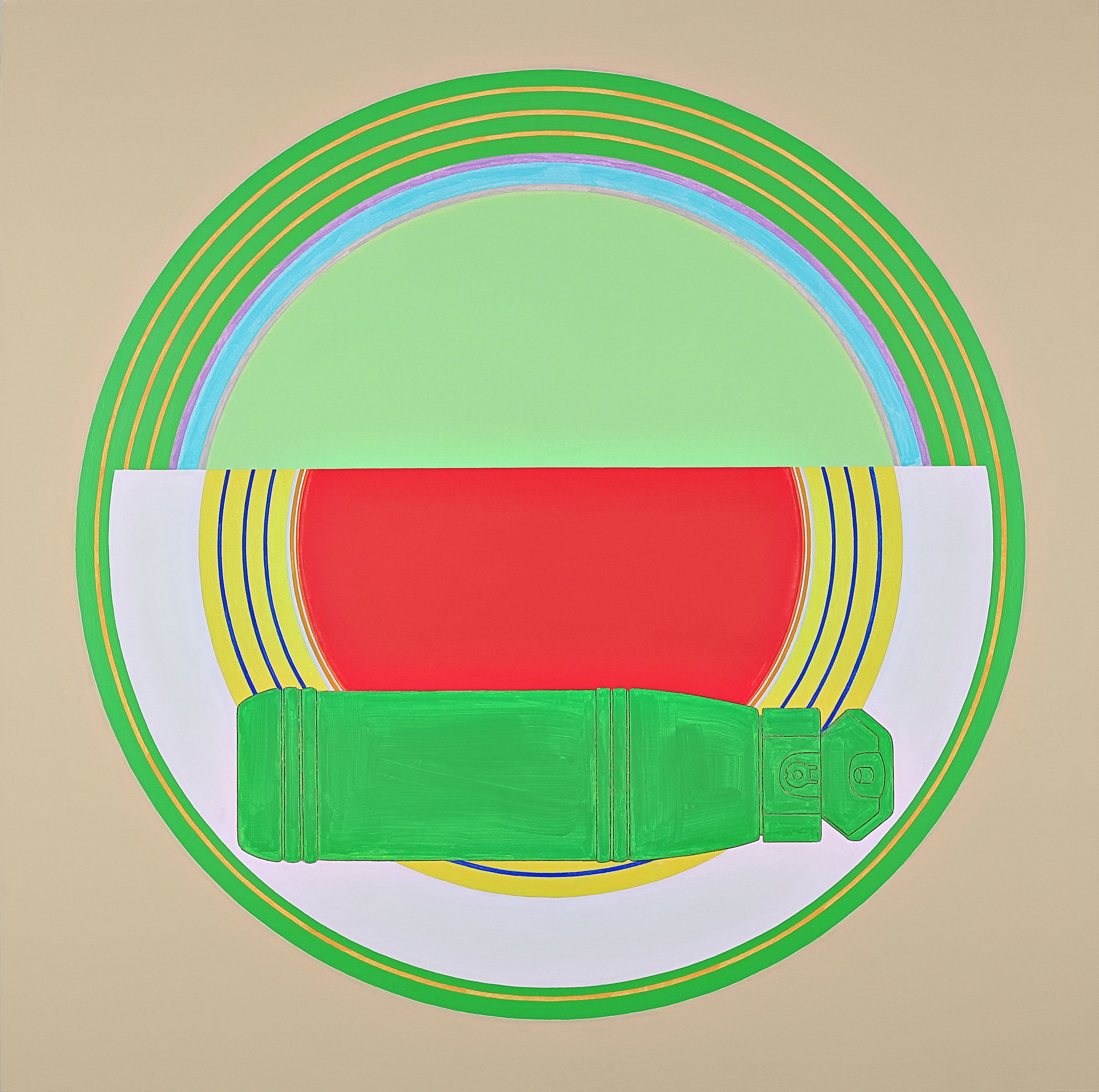
Irrigatoren-exp8, 2006

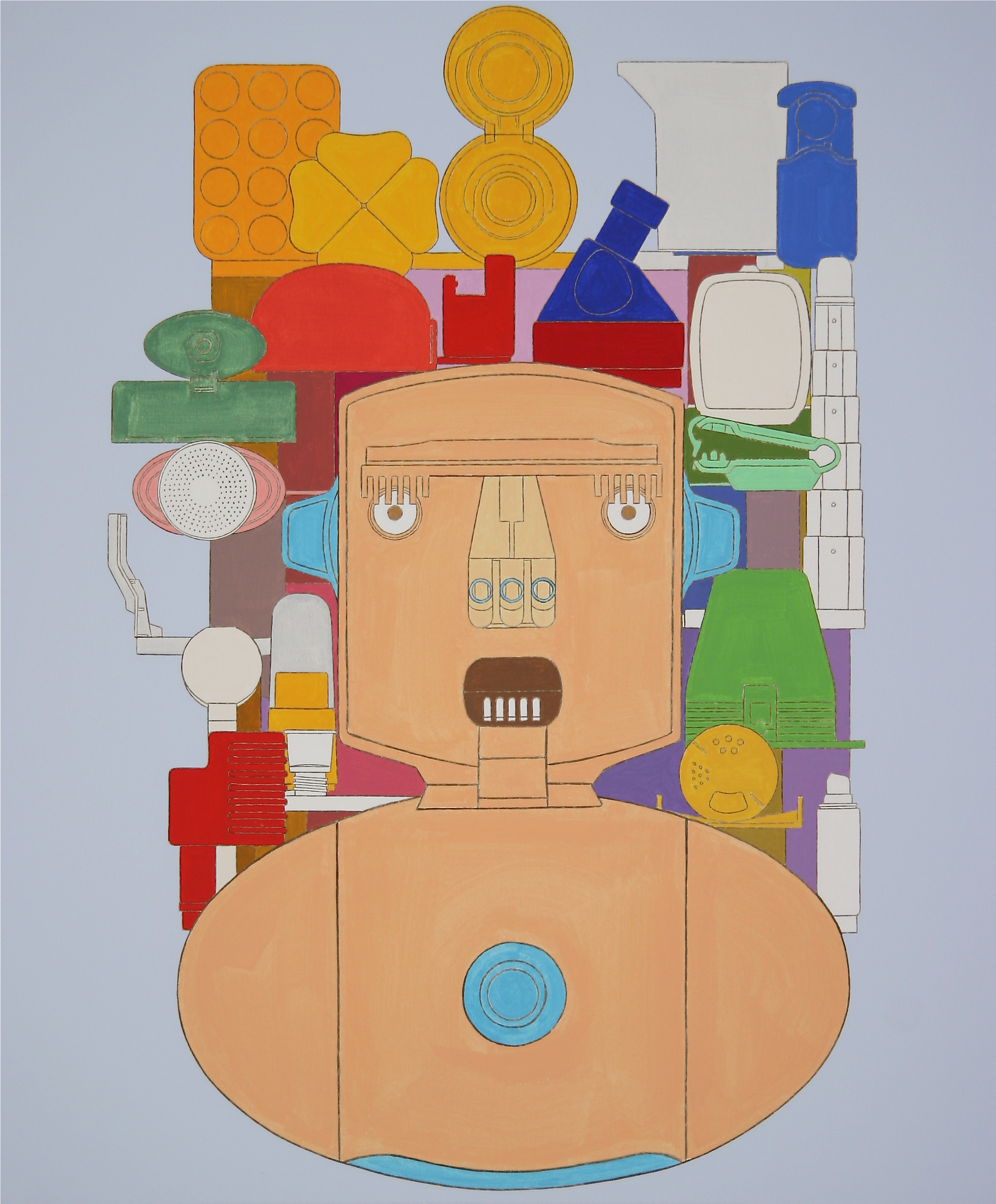
Figuren-exp5, 2009

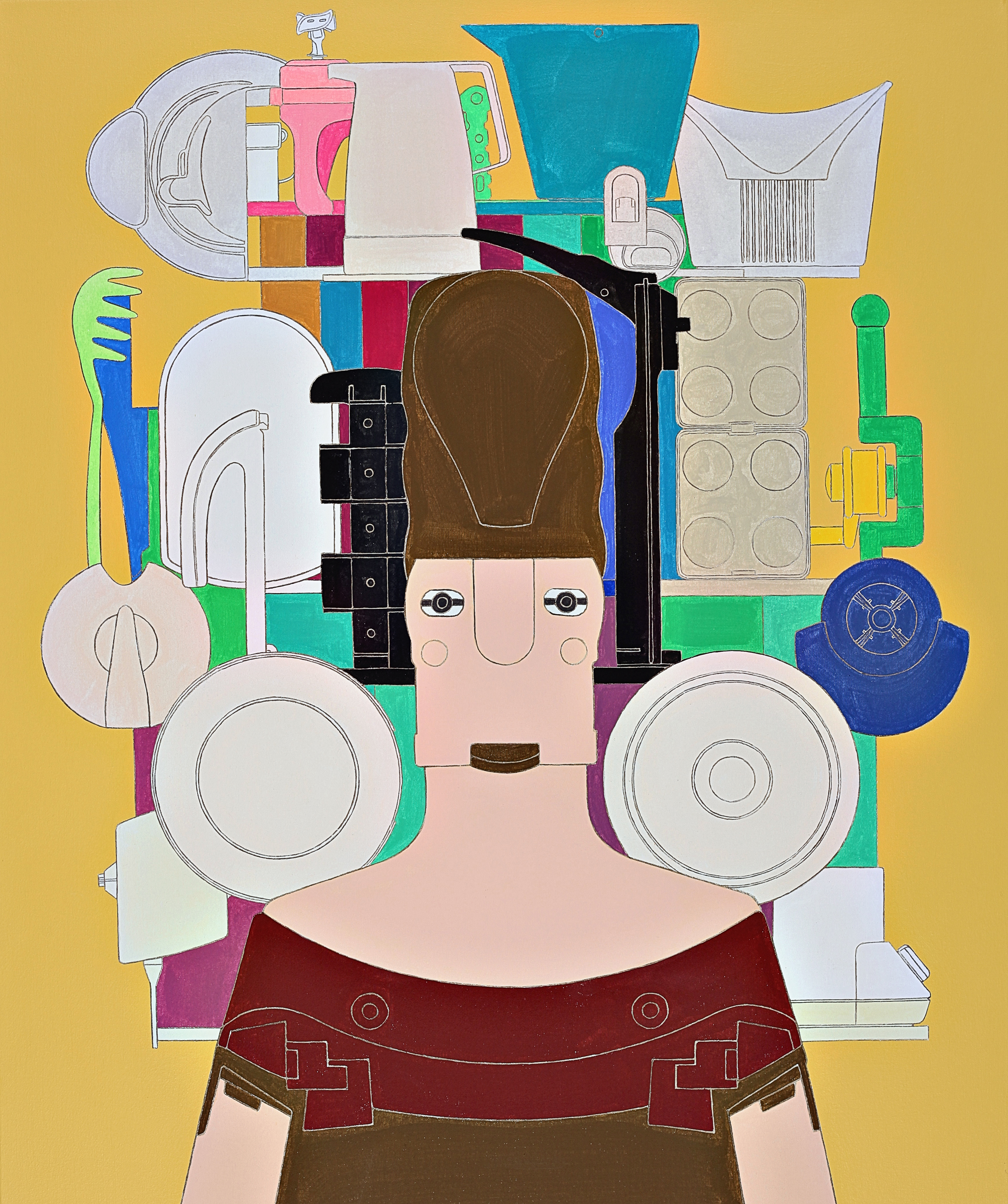
Figuren-exp34, 2009
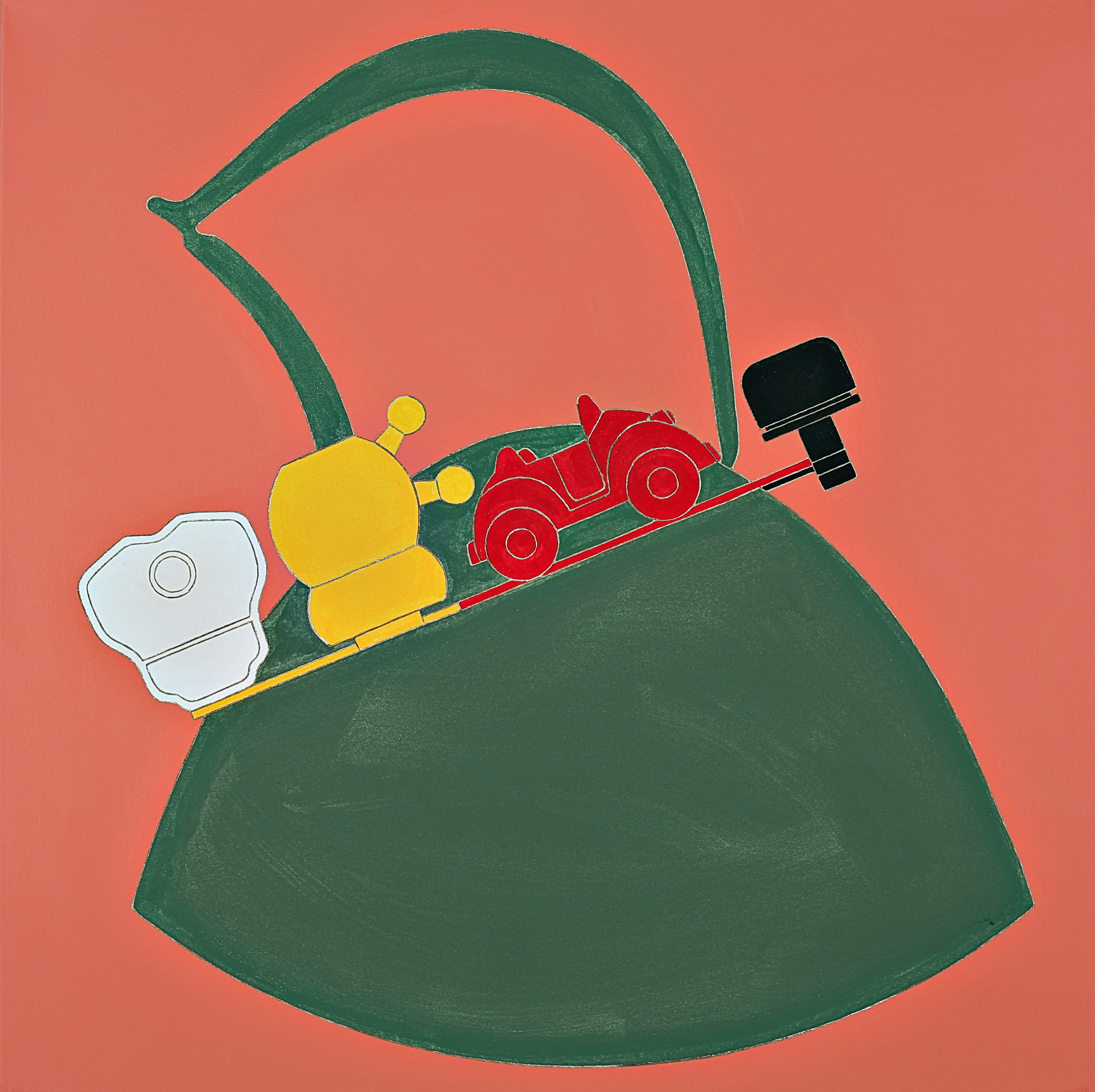
Bezüge-exp4, 2008

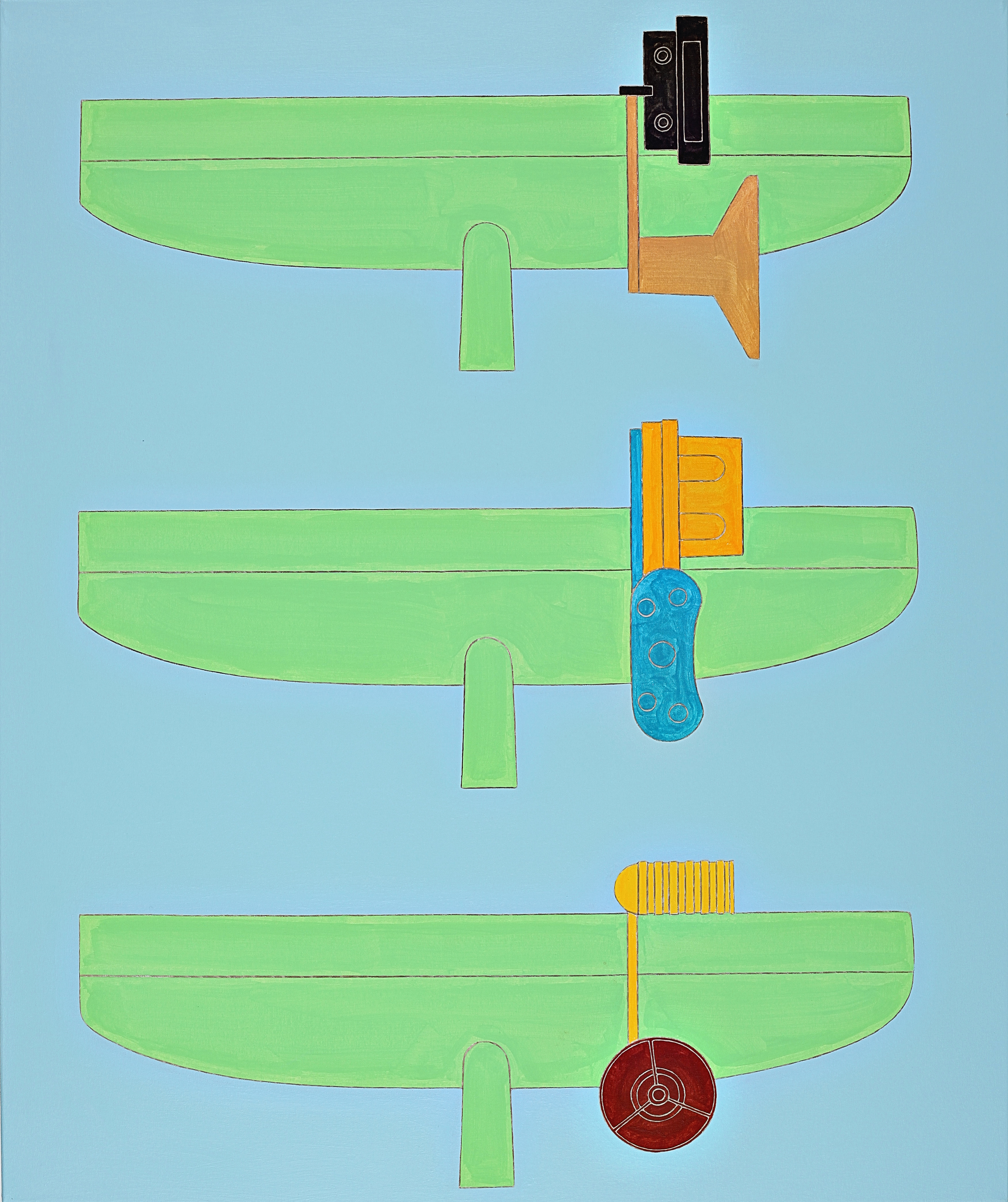
Bezüge-exp7, 2008

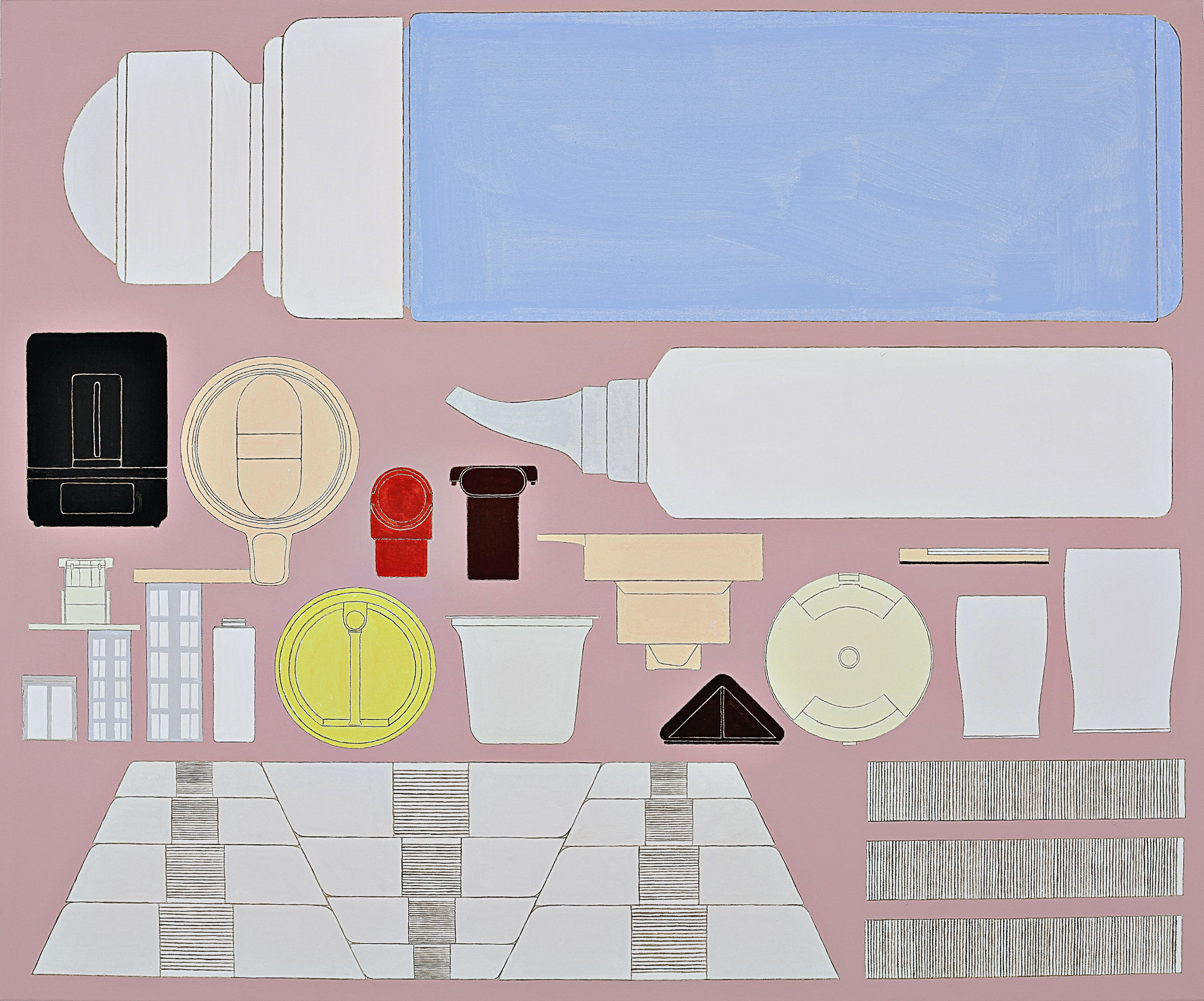
Kathedralen-Do it yourself-Baukaesten-Set1, 2009

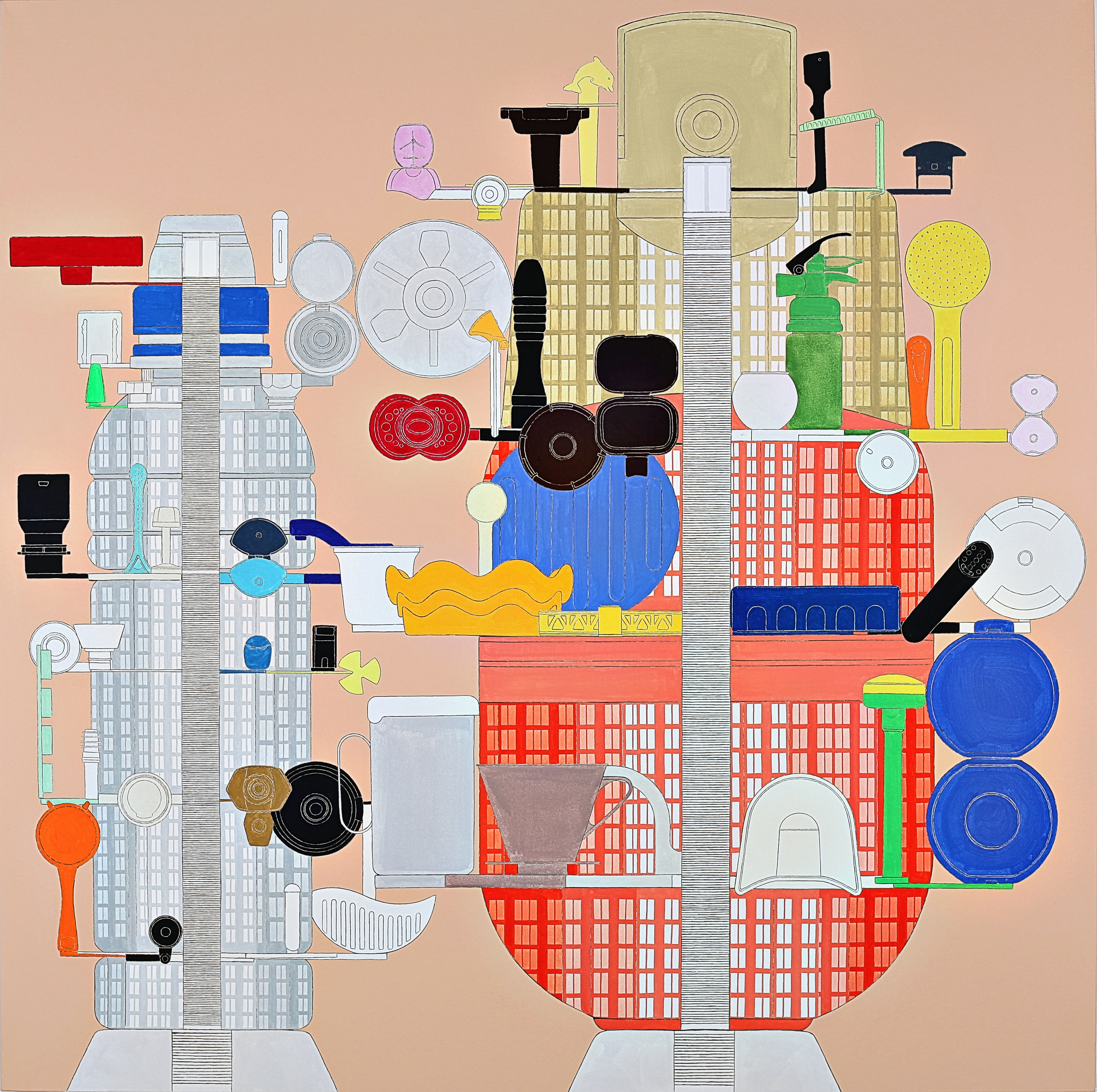
Kathedralen-exp1, 2009
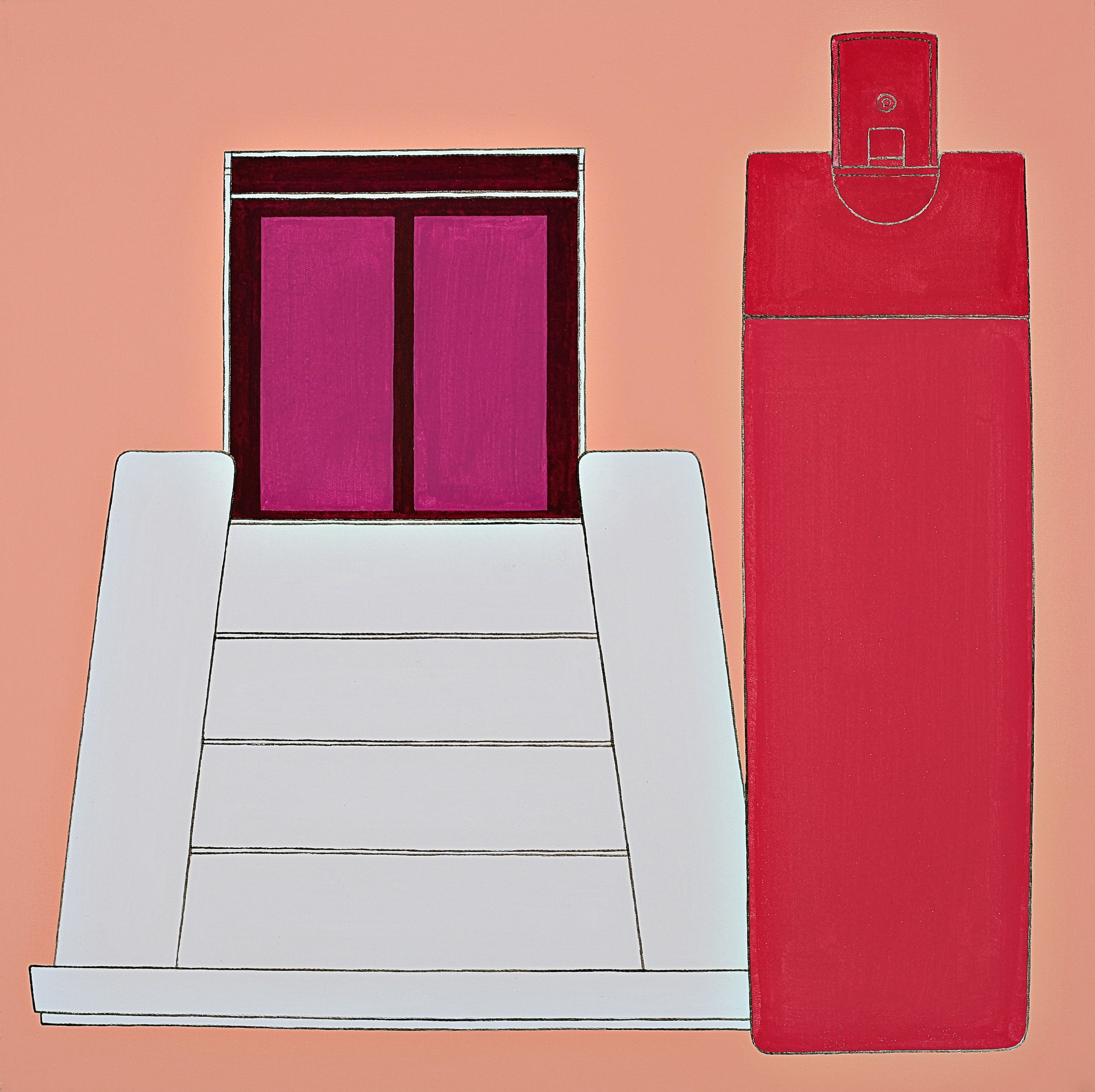
Angebote-exp15, 2008

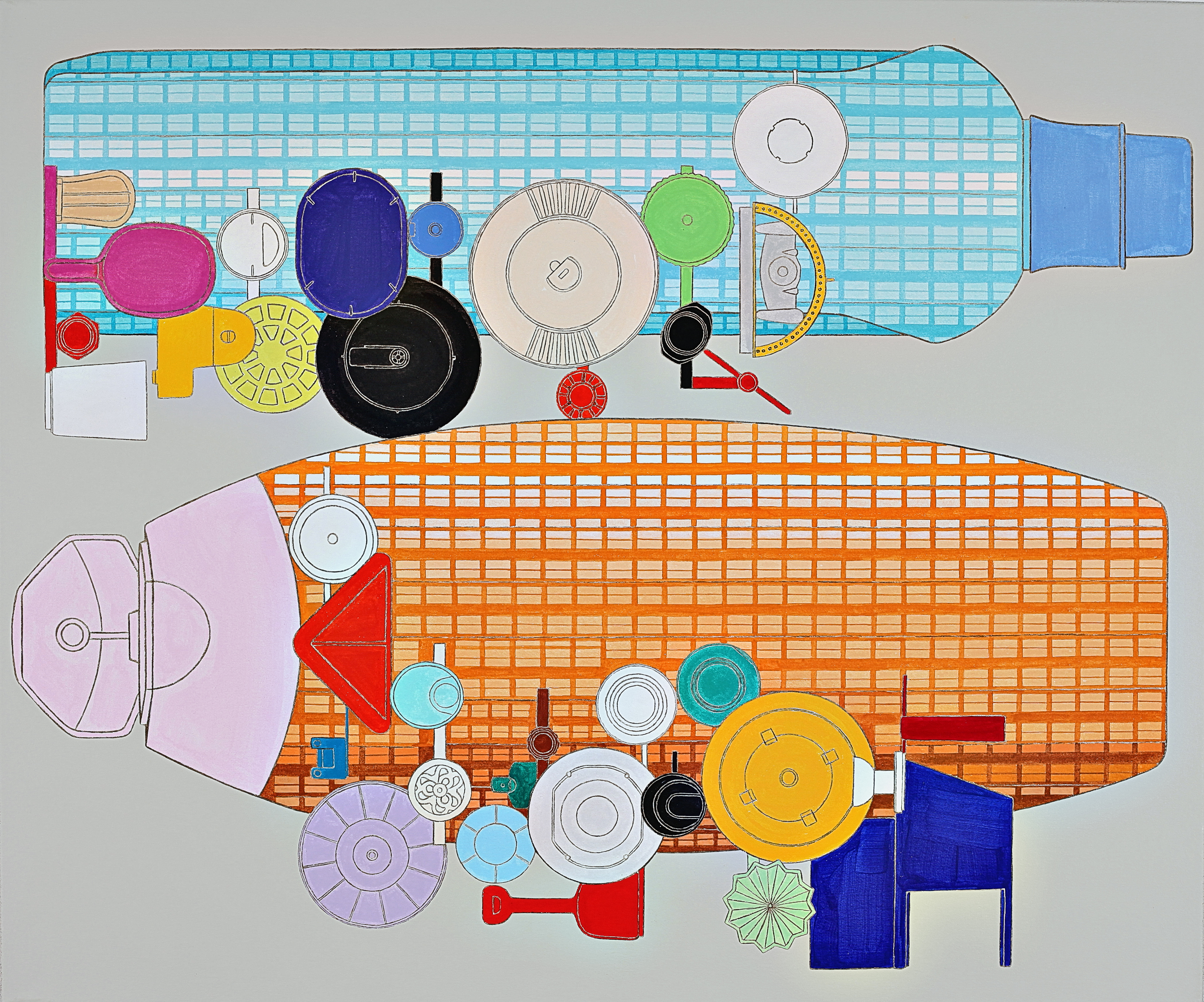
Kathedralen-schwerelos-exp7, 2009

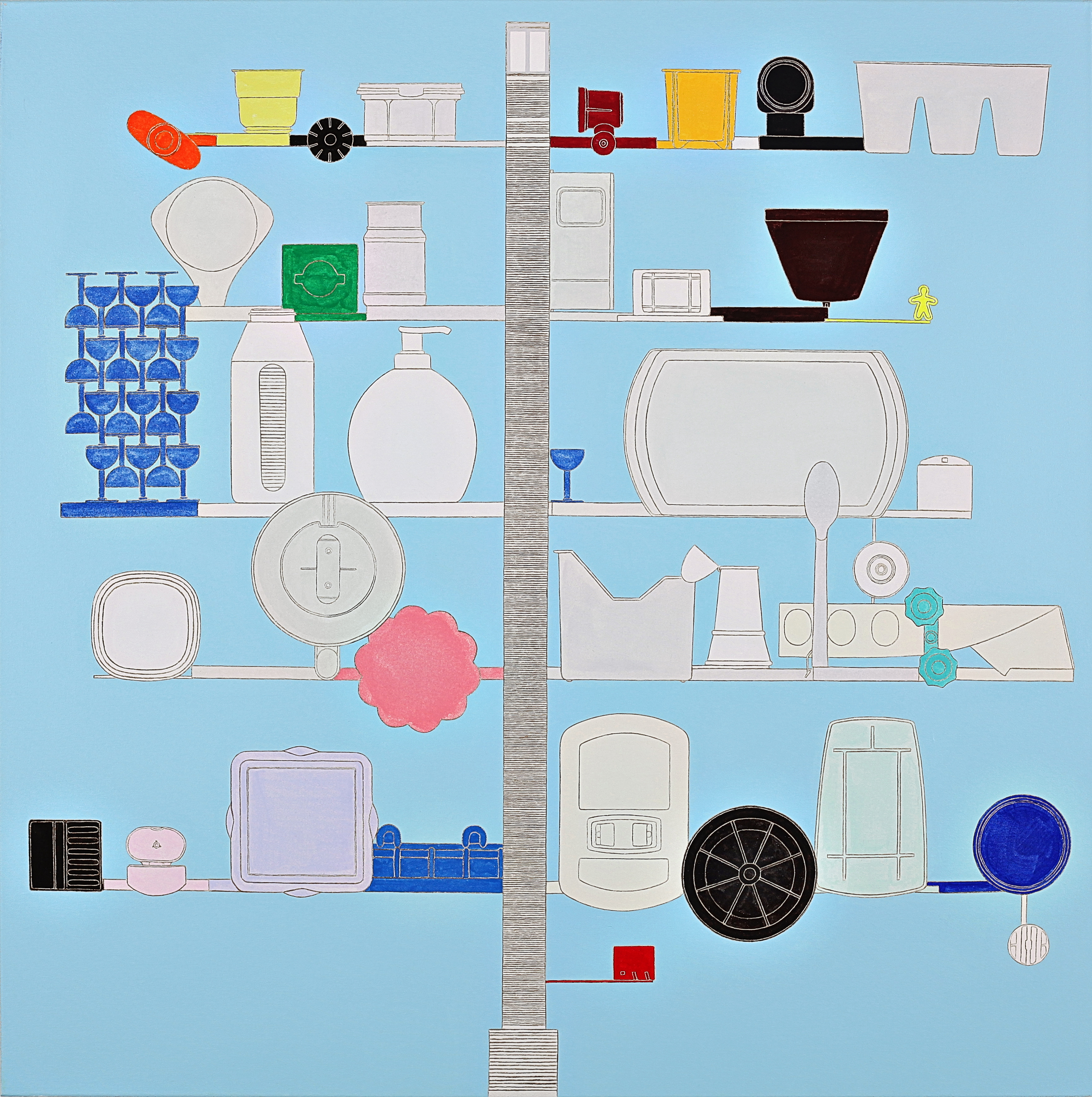
Antennen-exp2, 2009

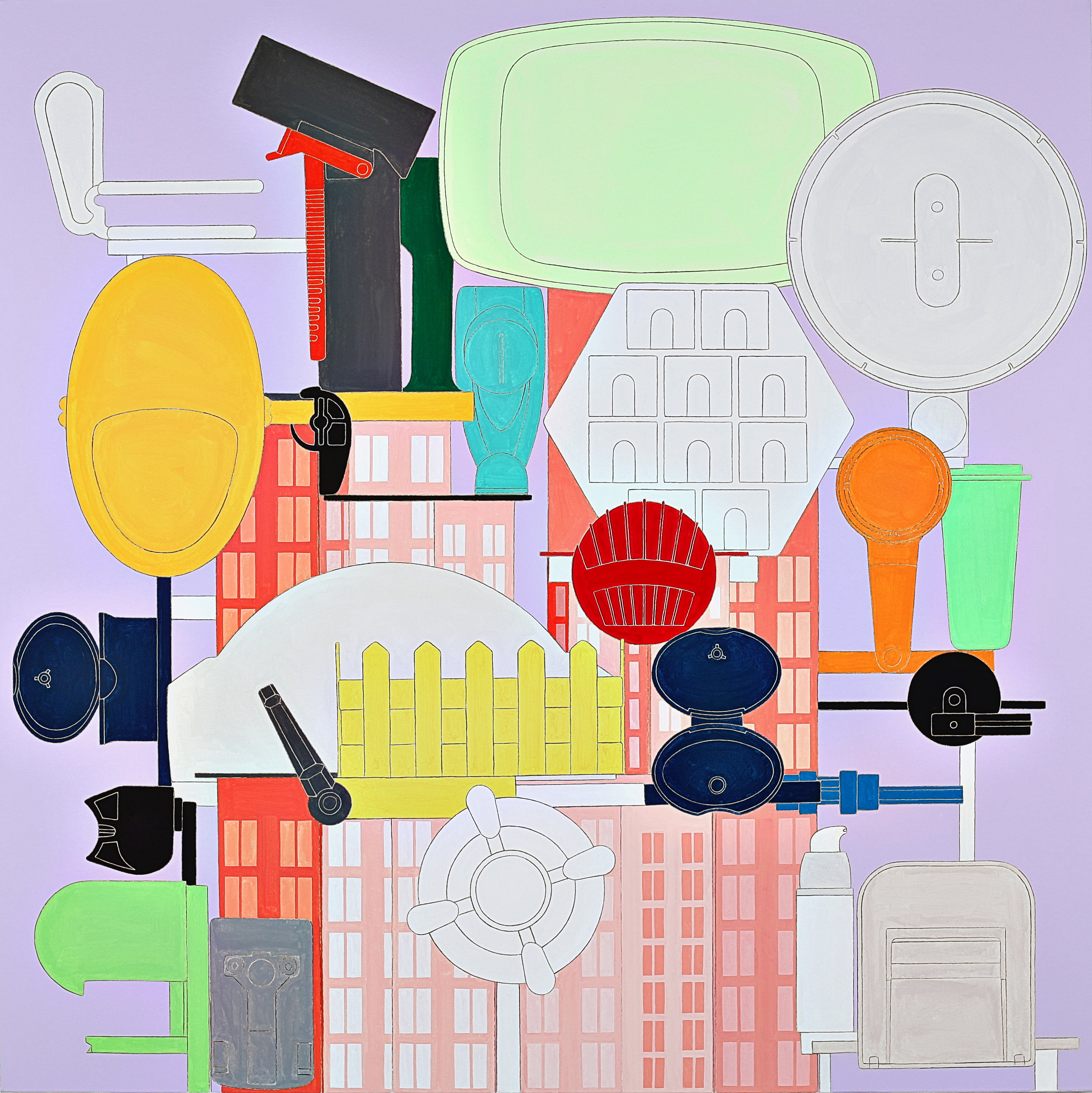
CD-HOMES-exp19, 2008
