= Moon Byung-nam =

Korean ballet dancer (1961/1962–2025)

Byung-nam Moon (1961 or 1962 – 9 April 2025) was a South Korean ballet dancer. He graduated from the Department of Dance at Chosun University in 1984 and the Graduate School, dept. of dance of Sejong University in 1998. He entered Korea National Ballet in 1984 and took the leading roles in all performances of the company until 1992. Also, he studied at the Tokyo City Ballet in 1988. He was selected as a beneficiary for overseas training by the Arts Council Korea to study in the U.S. in 1989. He worked as one of the ballet masters in the Korea National Ballet in 1993. In 1996, he went to Russia to complete the doctoral course in the Saint Petersburg National University of Culture and Art and obtained a PhD in Culture. He studied choreography at the Saint Petersburg Boris Eifman Ballet in 1997. He worked as a senior choreographer and one of the ballet masters in the Korea National Ballet from 1999 to 2002 and enthusiastically worked as an assistant artistic director of the Korea National Ballet beginning in 2005. Late in life, he choreographed Prince Hodong as a first release of the national representative project, which has become a hot issue in the world of ballet.

Moon died on 9 April 2025, at the age of 63.

== Awards ==
- 1986 Best performer at the Korea Dance Festival
- 1987 Honorary award at the 25th anniversary of the Korea National Ballet's foundation
- 1987 Minister prize of the Ministry of Culture in commemoration of '86 Asian Games'
- 1988 Minister prize of the Ministry of Athletics in commemoration of '88 Cultural Olympics'
- 1990 Best starring role of the Korea Ballet Association
- 1992 Honorary award at the 30th anniversary of the Korea National Ballet foundation

== Choreography ==
- Dynamic
- Three Dimensional
- Divertimento
- A death of a general
- Carmen
- Prince Hodong

== Performance ==
- Swan Lake
- The Nutcracker
- Les Sylphides
- Prince Hodong
- The Hunchback of Notre Dame
- Giselle
- Don Quixote
- Romeo and Juliet
- Carmen
