= Tae-ji Choi =

South Korean ballet dancer (born 1959)

Tae-ji Choi (최태지)
- Born: 1959 (age 66–67); Kyoto, Japan
- Occupation: artistic director (ballet)

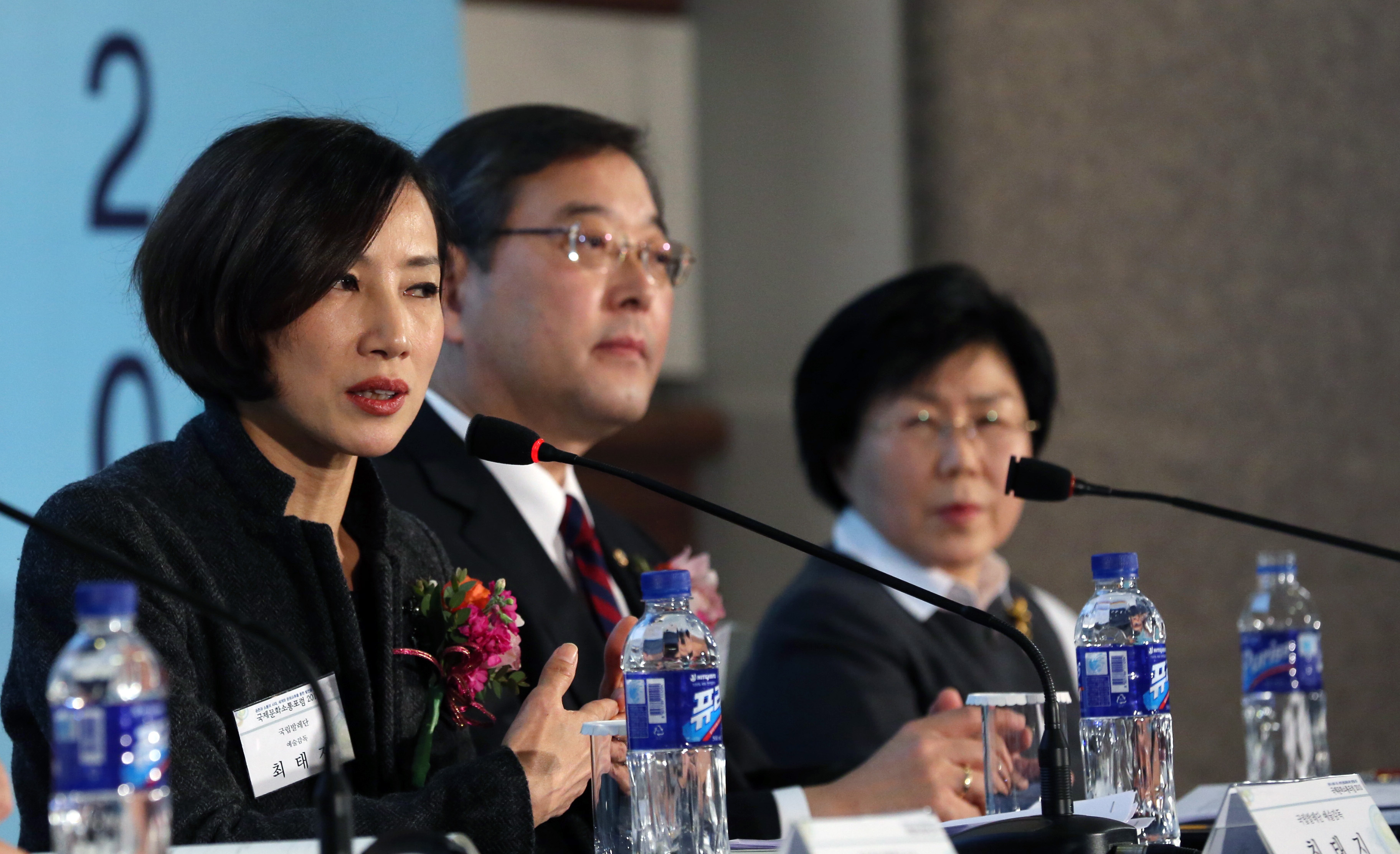
Tae-ji Choi (left), 2013

Tae-ji Choi (born 1959) is a Japanese-born Korean ballerina.

She was appointed as the 6th artistic director of the Korea National Ballet in 2008. She was born in Kyoto, Japan, and performed as a dancer there from 1968 to 1980. Her first performance for the Korea National Ballet was Scheherazade, in 1983 (where she performed as guest dancer).

She became a regular member of the Korea National Ballet in 1987 and danced as prima ballerina until 1992. She acted as member of the direction committee from 1993 to 1995 and worked as the 3rd head and artistic director of the Korea National Ballet from 1996 to 2001. She created Ballet with Commentary (a new program), and collaborated on a work with world artists such as Yuri Grigorovich and Jean-Christophe Maillot.

== Biographical introduction ==
- 1987–1992: Principal dancer of the Korea National Ballet
- 1993–1995: Member of the direction committee of the Korea National Ballet
- 1996 – December 2001: Head and artistic director of the Korea National Ballet
- 2000–2001: Principal of the ballet academy affiliated with the Korea National Ballet
- September 2001 – March 2002: Adjunct professor of department of dance, Sungkyunkwan University
- June 2004 – December 2007: Director of the Chongdong Theatre
- September 2004 – August 2006: Director of Jung-Gu Cultural Foundation
- May 2005 – October 2006: Member of the Presidential Committee on the Government Innovation & Decentralization
- July 2005 – June 2007: Member of the permanent committee of the National Unification Advisory Council
- September 2017 – the present: Head and artistic director of the Gwangju City Ballet.
