= Allen Yu =

Taiwanese dancer and choreographer

Allen Yu (Chinese: 余能盛; born 1959) is a Taiwanese dancer and choreographer. Trained as an engineer at the National Kaohsiung Institute of Technology, Yu attended Chinese Culture University before accepting a scholarship to the Royal Conservatory of The Hague. He performed and choreographed throughout Europe, in Belgium, Germany, and Austria, while maintaining a periodic affiliation with Chamber Ballet Taipei in Taiwan. Yu returned to Taiwan in 2015 to lead that dance company, which he renamed Formosa Ballet.

== Early life, education, and European career ==
Yu was born in Tainan in 1959. His first experience with dance came at age seven, when he was permitted to watch, but not participate in, his sister's lessons. While studying chemical engineering at National Kaohsiung Institute of Technology, Yu danced for recreation, performance, and competitive purposes. Following compulsory military service, Yu studied dance privately with Li Dan. He subsequently enrolled at Chinese Culture University, where he was taught by Wu Man-li and Gao Yan. Yu joined the institution's Hwa Kang Dance Troupe. After working with the Youth Goodwill Mission, Yu's scholarship to the Royal Conservatory of The Hague came into effect. Upon Yu's return to Taiwan in 1984, he found that there were little opportunity to perform. Through contacts at the Royal Conservatory, Yu auditioned for the Ballet royal de Wallonie of Charleroi. Yu later performed throughout Germany, namely at the Musiktheater im Revier, Theater Osnabrück, and Landestheater Coburg. At the Musiktheater im Revier, Yu received his first experience as a choreographer. With Theater Osnabrück, Yu was made ballet master. In 2001, Yu joined Oper Graz as deputy ballet director and choreographer. While with Graz, Yu has worked with the National Moravian-Silesian Theatre, as well as other companies. Yu has been acknowledged as the first male Taiwanese professional dancer in Europe and the first Taiwanese director of a European ballet company.

== Career in Taiwan ==
Yu worked with the Chamber Ballet Taipei and its cofounder Chiang Chiou-o on a part-time basis from 1994 to 1998. He served as the troupe's artistic director, ballet master and choreographer. He rejected a 1998 offer to lead the troupe outright, and the company became inactive. Yu's next performance in Taiwan was in 2003, with Wu Su-fen's Taipei Ballet Company. In 2006, Yu reestablished Chamber Ballet Taipei. He again served as the reincarnated troupe's artistic director and choreographer. As a part-time venture, the troupe was most active when Yu spent vacations in Taiwan. In the spring, Yu would host auditions, and spend summer in rehearsal. Under Yu's leadership, the Chamber Ballet Taipei's performances regularly featured live orchestral music, often by the Evergreen Symphony Orchestra. At the time, the playing of live music alongside ballet performances was considered a rarity in Taiwan. Yu has frequently featured the music of Pyotr Ilyich Tchaikovsky in his own work, and, in 2013, restaged Tchaikovsky's Swan Lake at Metropolitan Hall in Taipei. In 2015, Yu left Oper Graz to focus on Chamber Ballet Taipei, which he renamed Formosa Ballet. That same year, Yu was named the Tainan Municipal Cultural Center's first artistic director.
