= Seoul Ballet Theatre =

Ballet company in South Korea

Seoul Ballet Theatre is one of four professional ballet troupes in the Republic of Korea. It was founded in 1995 as the country's first private professional ballet company. In that year, it gave its first performances. In addition to regular performances, the company gives outreach performances around the country. In these performances, education in dance appreciation is a major factor. Seoul Ballet Theatre has created over 50 original productions, many of which integrate classical ballet with a distinctive Korean touch. "In 2007, Seoul Ballet Theatre entered into a new partnership with CJ Culture Foundation enabling both parties to enhance its capacity to contribute to Korea's ballet culture". There are twenty-five dancers in the troupe, including ballet master Woon Sik JEONG and ballet mistress Hyun Kyung CHO.

== External links and references ==
- Official website
