= Sermano =

Sermano Sermanu
- Commune
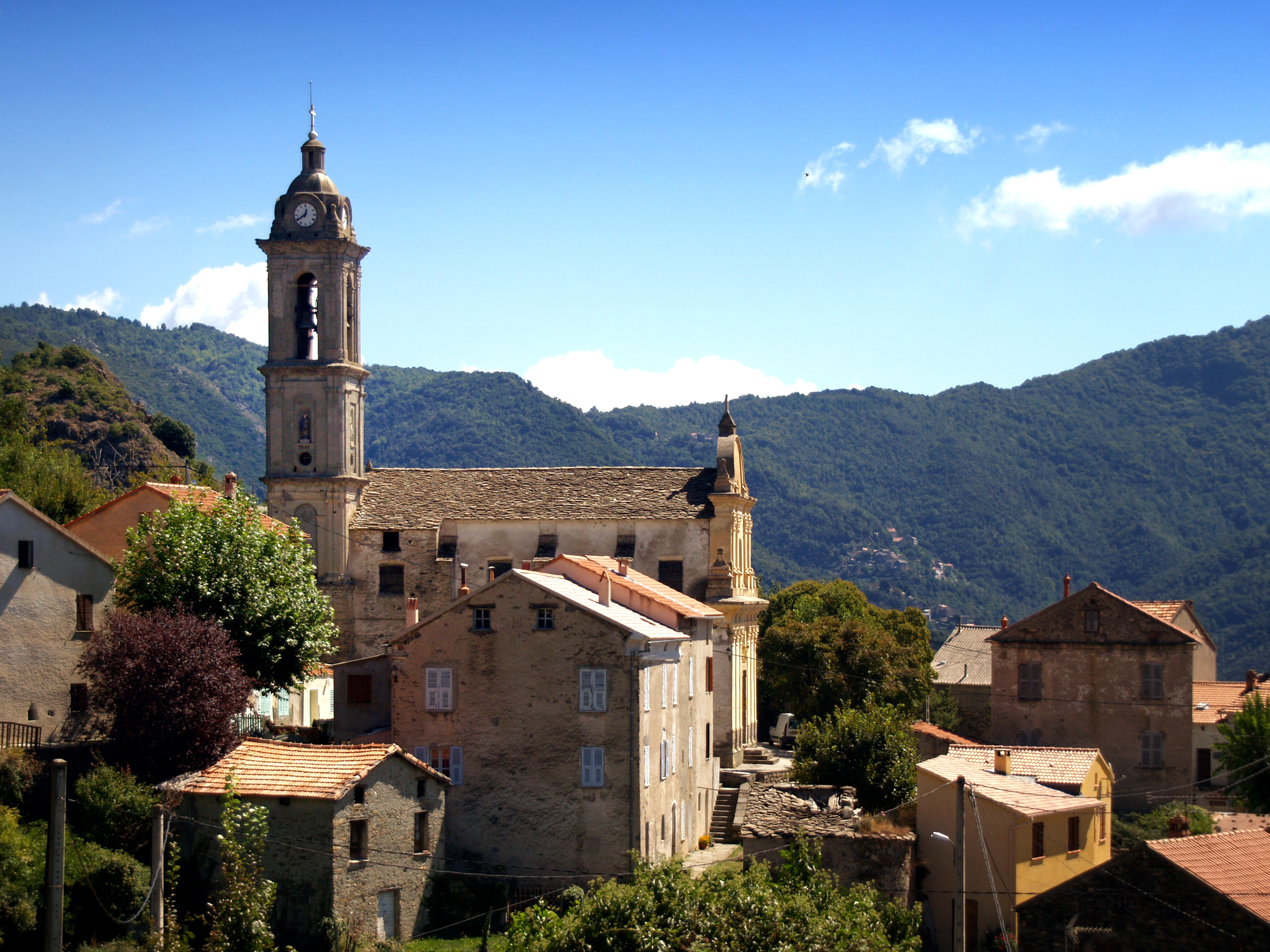
- A view of the village and the parish church of the Annunciation, in Sermano
- Location of Sermano
- Location within France Location within Corsica
- Coordinates: 42°18′54″N 9°16′06″E
- Country: France
- Region: Corsica
- Department: Haute-Corse
- Arrondissement: Corte
- Canton: Golo-Morosaglia

Government
  - Mayor (2020–2026): Jean Giudicelli
- Area^{1}: 7.62 km^{2} (2.94 sq mi)
- Elevation: 762 m (2,500 ft)
- Highest elevation: 1,420 m (4,660 ft)
- Lowest elevation: 407 m (1,335 ft)
- Population (2023): 72
  - Density: 9.4/km^{2} (24/sq mi)
- Time zone: UTC+01:00 (CET)
  - Summer (DST): UTC+02:00 (CEST)
- INSEE/Postal code: 2B275 /20250
- ^{1} French Land Register data, which excludes lakes, ponds, glaciers > 1 km^{2} (0.386 sq mi or 247 acres) and river estuaries.

Sermano (French pronunciation: [sɛʁmano]; Corsican: Sermanu) is a commune in the Haute-Corse department of France on the island of Corsica.

== Population ==
Historical population
Year	Pop.	±% p.a.
1968	90	—
1975	85	−0.81%
1982	76	−1.59%
1990	63	−2.32%
1999	76	+2.11%
2007	78	+0.33%
2012	64	−3.88%
2017	63	−0.31%
2023	72	+2.25%
Source: INSEE

== See also ==
- Communes of the Haute-Corse department
- Tour de Corse.
