= Ballet Municipal de Lima =

General information
- Name: Ballet Municipal de Lima
- Year founded: 1983
- Founding artistic director: Lucy Telge de Linder
- Principal venue: Municipal Theatre of Lima (Teatro Municipal de Lima)
- Website: Official Website

Senior staff
- Director: Lidia Segni

Artistic staff
- Ballet Master in Chief: Mikhail Koukharev

Other
- Formation: Principal; Soloist; Corps de Ballet

The Ballet Municipal de Lima is Peru's classical ballet company, based in the capital city of Lima.

== History ==
The Ballet Municipal de Lima was founded in 1983 by Lucy Telge de Linder, who remains the current company's director. Although the company is a small one by international standards (48 dancers during the 2011-2012 season), it is a professional company that performs regularly in Lima, as well as touring throughout Latin America.

The company's repertoire includes classical ballet standards such as Giselle, Swan Lake, La Sylphide, Coppélia, Romeo and Juliet, La Fille Mal Gardee, Le Corsaire, and several others.

== See also ==
- Peruvian culture
- Ballet
