= Richard Wherlock =

British dancer and choreographer (born 1958)

Richard Wherlock (born 21 August 1958) is a British dancer and choreographer. He has directed Ballett Basel since 2001.

Wherlock studied dance at the Ballet Rambert School and later became a solo dancer at the Cologne Dance Forum. Wherlock has worked as a choreographer with various European ensembles and has collaborated with renowned stage and costume designers. He is also a juror for numerous international dance competitions. In addition to his dance career, Wherlock has been involved in film and television, creating choreography for Claude Lelouch's film Hasards au coïncidences and collaborating with Swiss director Markus Fischer on two award-winning films.

== Life and work ==
Wherlock was born on 21 August 1958 in Bristol. He studied dance at the Ballet Rambert School and eventually became committed to the Ballet Rambert as a dancer. In 1981, he was engaged by de:Jochen Ulrich as the solo dancer at the Cologne Dance Forum. While there, he first worked out his own choreography, which was soon an inherent part of the troupe’s repertoire. From 1991 to 1996, he was the ballet director at the Hagen Theatre, where, according to the opinions of critics, he succeeded in advancing "into the first element of his craft" and finally removed the label of provinciality from the Hagen dance troupe. With his anticlassical choreography of La Fille mal gardée, he garnered wide recognition, and he was awarded a sponsorship prize from the state of North Rhine-Westphalia in 1993. After that, he was the ballet director at Lucerne Theatre for three seasons and worked from 1999 until 2001 at the Komische Oper Berlin. The dance troupe there was renamed the BerlinBallett in 1999, and after Wherlock’s departure in 2004, it became the Berlin State Ballet, joining with the ensembles of the German State Opera and the State Opera Under the Linden. In Berlin, he worked with the Italian dancers and choreographers Giorgio Madia and de:Massimo Gerardi, among others.

Parallel to his work as a dancer in Cologne and in the director's jobs in Hagen, Lucerne, Berlin, and Basel, he worked as a choreographer with a string of European ensembles: New English Contemporary Ballet, Europa Danse (UNESCO), Scapino Ballet Rotterdam, Introdans in Arnhem, ensembles from Braunschweig, Düsseldorf, Essen, and Karlsruhe, the Ballet National de Nancy et de Lorraine, ensembles from Marseille and Nice, the Finnish National Ballet, the Romanian National Ballet, the Iceland Ballet, and in Graz, Singapore, and San Martín in Argentina. His work was also shown at festivals, such as Zweiten Uni Modern Dance Festival of the de:AZet Dance Company in Kaiserslautern. For Les Étoiles de l'Opéra National de Paris, he created a full-length ballet.

=== Ballett Basel ===
Since 2001, Wherlock has directed and shaped Ballett Basel, the dance troupe of Theater Basel, he has worked on new choreography, and since 2004, he has also led the festival, Basel tanzt. In August 2014, he worked in Seoul with six dancers from the Seoul Ballet Theatre on a new piece: Snip Shot. Sometime later, the director of the Seoul Ballet Theatre, James Jeton, created a dance piece with ensemble members from the Ballett Basel. The two pieces were performed together for the 20th anniversary of the South Korean troupe in Gwacheon and Seoul and later at the anniversary gala 15 Years of Ballet with Richard Wherlock in Basel.

Richard Wherlock supported young talent for many years. Among the number of well-known dancers who have performed his choreography are de:Francesc Abós of Spain, de:Jochen Heckmann of Germany, Cinthia Labaronne of Argentina and de:Gaetano Posterino of Italy. Wherlock has worked with the stage designers Bruce French, Manfred Gruber, Regina Lorenz, and Michael Simon as well as with the costume designers Antonio D'Amico, Edward Hermans, Helena de Medeiros, Heidi de Raad, and Diana Stiehl. In April 2014, it was announced that Richard Wherlock would also hold the position of director of Ballett Basel during the directorship of Andreas Beck. For his first premiere in the Beck Directorship, Wherlock chose the character of Tevye from Sholem Aleichem's Tevye the Dairyman, who achieved great popularity in the musical version Fiddler on the Roof. He asked Olivier Truan from the Swiss klezmer band Kolsimcha to write the music for this ballet. The premiere was a great success for the composer and choreographer with the audience and press, earning a standing ovation.

Richard Wherlock was and still is a juror for numerous international dance competitions.

=== Film and television ===
Wherlock was responsible for the choreography for Claude Lelouch's movie Hasards au coïncidences. This film was successfully shown at the Venice International Film Festival, at the Montreal World Film Festival, and at the Chicago International Film Festival.

In 2000 and 2003, Wherlock, in collaboration with Swiss director Markus Fischer, developed two movies for the broadcaster DRS, which both received multiple awards: Passengers and One Bullet Left. In 2012, Simone Winkler's documentary, Before Opening Night: Richard Wherlock and His Company, depicted the tension of the ensemble before a premiere.
