= Malandain Ballet Biarritz =

Ballet company in Biarritz, France

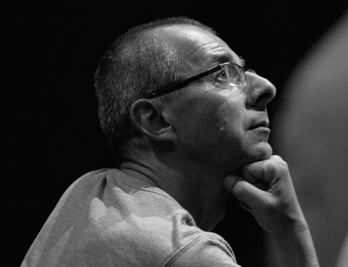
Thierry Malandain, director-choreographer of the Malandain Ballet Biarritz

The Malandain Ballet Biarritz was created in 1998 in Biarritz. It is one of 19 National Choreographic Centers (Centres Chorégraphiques Nationaux) in France. The Malandain Ballet Biarritz is directed by its choreographer Thierry Malandain, has 22 dancers, and focuses on contemporary ballet and neoclassical ballet. Since its creation, the Malandain Ballet Biarritz has been located in the Gare du Midi of Biarritz, a former railway station that has been transformed into a theater.

== Repertoire ==
Unless otherwise noted, choreographies are exclusively creations by Thierry Malandain for the Malandain Ballet Biarritz.

- 2021 The Firebird, choreography Thierry Maladain; The Rite of Spring, choreography by Martin Harriague / Stravinsky
- 2017
- 2016
- 2015 Beauty and the Beast / Tchaikovsky
- 2014 Estro / Vivaldi
- 2014 Nocturnes / Chopin
- 2013 Cinderella / Prokofiev
- 2012 Silhouette / Beethoven
- 2012 Last Song / French traditional songs / received on 14 June 2012 the Syndicat de la Critique's main prize
- 2011 Lucifer / Connesson
- 2010 Roméo et Juliette / Berlioz
- 2009 Magifique / Tchaikovsky
- 2008 Le Portrait de l'infante / Ravel
- 2008 L'Amour sorcier / De Falla
- 2006 Don Juan / Gluck
- 2005 Les petits riens / Mozart
- 2004 Sang des étoiles / Mahler, Waldteufel, Strauss, Minkus
- 2003 Cigale / Massenet
- 2003 Les créatures / Beethoven
- 2002 La mort du cygne / Saint-Saëns
- 2002 Le Biches / Poulenc
- 2001 Fleur de pierre / Prokofiev
- 2001 Boléro / Ravel
- 2001 Spectre de la rose / von Weber
- 2000 Chambre d’amour / Cabalette
- 1999 Le Carillon / Massenet
- 1999 Le Cid / Massenet
- 1998 Perre de lune / Britten
- 1998 Ouverture Cubaine / Gershwin
