= Korea National Ballet =

South Korean ballet company

The Korea National Ballet is a South Korean ballet company. It was founded in 1962 in Seoul as the National Ballet Company. It was one of the affiliates of the National Theater of Korea until 1999, when it separated to independently reestablish itself in the Seoul Arts Center in the following year.

It has sixty-five dancers, chosen annually through open audition. There are currently 80 members in the company, including regular members, associate members, and trainees. Equipped with the nation's top dancers and diverse repertoires, the Korea National Ballet has taken the lead in developing the field of performance. Welcoming artistic director Tae-ji Choi who was reappointed in 2011, the Korea National Ballet reflects on its past achievements done under the slogan of Globalization, Refinement and Popularization of ballet for the past half century. Overseas tours have included performances in Egypt and Israel in 1997, China in 2000 and 2001, Japan in 2002, and more recent trips to Russia.

One of the prima ballerinas of the company, Joo-won Kim was the winner of the BENOIS de la DANSE prize 2006. In 2007, the company disciplined her for having appeared topless in a Korean fashion magazine. The company said she had engaged in employment outside her contract.

== Artistic directors ==
- Lim Sung-nam (1962–1992)
- Kim Hae-sik (1993–1995)
- Choi Tae-ji (1996–2001)
- Kim Geung-soo (2002–2004)
- Park In-ja (2005–2007)
- Choi Tae-ji (2008–2013)
- Kang Sue-jin (2014– )

== Structure ==
Korea National Ballet is composed of 5 ranks of dancers.

=== Principal Dancers ===
Kim Joo-won, Ji-Young Kim, Yoon Hae-Jin, Lee Young-Cheol, Lee Dong-Hoon, Kim Li-Hoe, Park Seul-Ki, Lee Eun-Won, Lee Jae-Woo

=== Grand Soloists ===
Jong-pil Lee, Young-jae, Jung Hae-Ran, Chong Nam-Yull, Lee Soo-Hee, Park Ki-hyun, Shin Seung-won, Song Jung-Bin, Bae Min-Soon, Shin Hye-jin, Kim Youn-Sik, Kim Ki-Wan

=== Soloists ===
Ji-young Kim, Hae-ran Jung, Woo-youn Hong, Jun-bum Kim, Hyun-ok Jung, Jun-hee Kim, Soo-hee Lee, Jung-yoon Choi, Jun-yong Ha, Hyun-kyung Park, Woo-jung Jang, Hye-ju Go, Nan-hee Yoo, Ellis Jung Tiffany.

=== Coryphées ===
Eun-jin Kim, Sun-hee Bang, Hyang-jo Lee, Sung-chul Lim, Ki-hyun Park, Jung-bin Song, Seung-won Shin, Hyun-ah Jung, Jae-min Seo and Jeon-il Yoon

=== Corps de Ballet ===
Ju-hyun Jung, Chang-ik Kim, Salapsun Hwang, Hee-hyun Kim, Min-soon Bae, Hyo-jin Ahn, Seo-hee Chae, Hyo-hyung Kang, Jong-yeol Kim, Na-ri Park, Hae-jin Shin, Dae-sung Lee, Sang-ro Lee, Monica Lee, Ju-yeun Jang, Youn-sik Kim, Ho-hyun Sun, Eun-won Lee, Min-kyoung Kim, Ji-hee Kim, Ha-lim Byun, Seo-hee Lee, Seul-bi Lee, Jae-eun Jung, Ji-young Jung, Da-jeong Hur, Da-hae Kim, Ju-beam Kim, Tae-hwan Kim, Han-gil Kim, Ye-eun Park, Eugene Won, Ye-seul Lee, Sun-a Choi, Ho-jin Jung, Min-ji Jung, Kyung-sik Kim and Tiffany Ellis Jung.

== Performances ==
The Korea National Ballet has introduced the world artists' masterpieces such as Boris Eifman's Musagète, Requiem, Bravo Figaro, Tchaikovsky: The Mystery of Life and Death, Yury Grigorovich's Spartacus, Swan Lake, The Nutcracker, Romeo and Juliet, Raymonda, Jean-Christophe Maillot's Romeo and Juliet, Cinderella, Do’ve La Luna, Mats Ek's Carmen and Michel Fokine's Chunhyang L'Epreuve d'Amour, Les Sylphides, George Balanchine’s Symphony in C, Tchaikovsky Pas de Deux, Fernand Nault's Carmina Burana, Byung-nam Moon’s Prince Hodong, Marius Petipa’s Giselle, Le Corsaire, La Bayadère, Alexandre Gorsky's Don Quixote, Philippe Alonso’s La Fille Mal Gardée, Rudolf Nureyev's Sleeping Beauty, etc. to Korea, and these performances were extremely well received.

The Ballet with Commentary created by artistic director Tae-ji Choi was newly established in 1997. It has broken many records among the numerous annual performances in the Korea dance world. It is the first ballet performance with commentary and the first permanent dance performance in the Korean dance world. The Korea National Ballet currently performs 'Visiting Ballet with Commentary' for audiences who would not otherwise have an opportunity to see ballet, in areas, such as small villages and army bases, etc. Further in 2010, the Korea National Ballet has performed for the first time the Full-length Ballet with Commentary, Coppelia.

== Reviews ==
- Ballet Magazine
