= Prince Hodong (ballet) =

- Company: Korea National Ballet
- Genre: Modern Ballet

The ballet Prince Hodong, sponsored by the Ministry of Culture, Sports, and Tourism as a part of the Nation Branding project, is an original work based on a traditional tale, Prince Hodong and Nakrang Princess. Sung-nam Lim, the 1st Artistic Director of the Korea National Ballet, choreographed Prince Hodong in 1988 and Byung-nam Moon, the Deputy Artistic Director, newly interpreted it as a 21st-century ballet. Although there have been many dances created based on Korean literature over the last 50 years of the Korea National Ballet, the ballet Prince Hodong is itself a great piece of art because the tale Prince Hodong consists of a dramatic plot. Prince Hodong is based on our cultural text and with the themes - the nations, war, love, betrayal, and death - this work is composed of 2 acts and 12 scenes which combine modern techniques and classical sentiment. Prince Hodong is a ballet which presents an example of the globalization of Korean culture in the 21st century by combining western artistic culture with Korean traditional culture.

== Synopsis ==
The legend of Prince Hodong and Nakrang Princess is told in the Koryeo's Samguk Sagi texts that are over a thousand years old from the Three Kingdoms era. By the time of Goguryeo's third ruler, King Daemusin, Goguryeo peaked as a powerful nation. Nakrang, on the other hand, allied with China's Han dynasty and possessed Jammyungo which played itself whenever danger approached the nation. Because of the Jammungo, Goguryeo was unsuccessful in its attempts to conquer Nakrang.

=== First Act ===
Goguryeo attacks Nakrang with a huge army, but the legendary drum Jammyungo alerts Nakrang's army and they successfully defend their country. After losing in the battle, Goguryeo's King Daemusin prays to his gods and orders his son, Prince Hodong, to attack Nakrang once again. Queen Wonbi tries to get intimate with her stepson, Prince Hodong. But Prince Hodong ignores her attention and leaves with his soldiers to explore the eastern part of his country. While exploring the countryside, Prince Hodong enters a hunting contest and catches a white deer, which is considered as a godly creature. This leads to an invitation by Nakrang's King Choiree to visit his country, where Prince Hodong meets Princess Nakrang for the first time.

=== Second Act ===
Hodong and Nakrang get married in an extravagant wedding ceremony and swear to love each other till death. But Hodong leaves for Goguryeo and Nakrang awaits his return with tears. In the meantime, General Pildeh confesses his love for Princess Nakrang, but Princess Nakrang doesn't even give him a second glance. After returning to Goguryeo, Prince Hodong sends a secret letter to his wife, Princess Nakrang, asking her to tear apart Jammyungo so that Goguryeo can conquer Nakrang. Torn between her husband and her father, Princess Nakrang finally decides to tear apart Jammyungo, and this leads King Choiree to kill his own daughter.

== Characters ==
=== Goguryeo ===
- Prince Hodong: Age 20. He is the 1st son of the 3rd king of Goguryeo King Daemusin, and the princess of Buyeo. Intelligent and brave, Hodong deeply respects his parents and country. However, he faces a tragic end while procrastinating between his love for a woman and that for his country.
- King Daemusin: He conquered vast lands and is the esteemed leader of Goguryeo. But to Hodong, he is a cold-hearted father.
- Wonbi: She is the first wife of King Daemusin and is extremely ambitious. She is attracted to Hodong, the son from the princess of Buyeo. She conspires to make her son, Prince Haewoo, the king. Her beauty was known all over the nation.

=== Nakrang ===
- Princess Nakrang: Age 18. She is the only child of King Choiree. Instead of her own country, she chooses love. She is so beautiful that she is famous even in Goguryu.
- King Choiree: Age 50. Though gentle and weak, King Choiree is committed to the people of his nation. Fate brings him to kill his daughter who tears Jamyunggo apart.
- General Pildeh: Age 25. If there is Prince Hodong to Goguryeo, there is General Pildeh to Nakrang. He has the intelligence of a scholar and bravery as a warrior.
