= The Little Mermaid =

1837 fairy tale by Hans Christian Andersen

- Short story by Hans Christian Andersen
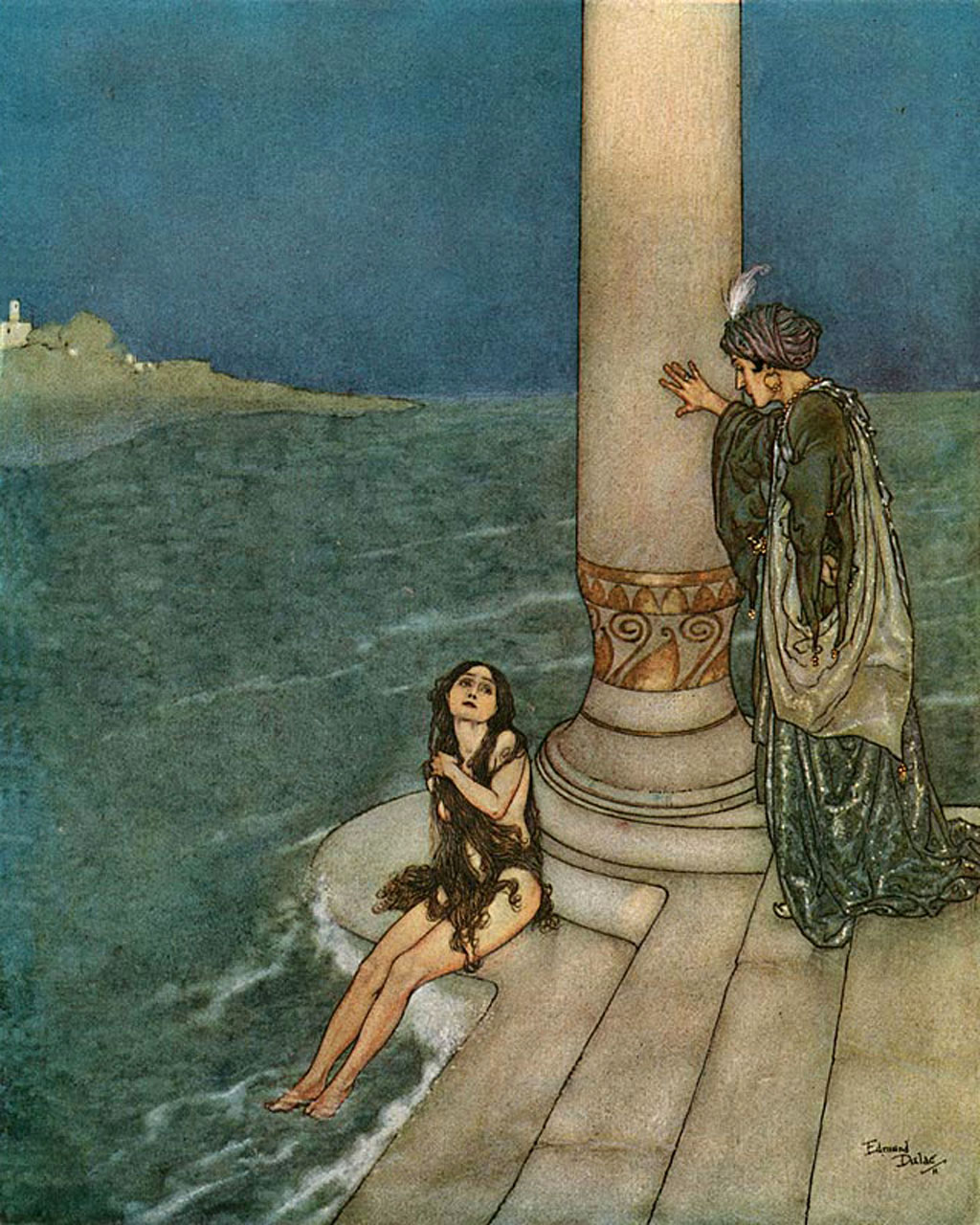
- The Little Mermaid – illustration by Edmund Dulac

Text available at Wikisource

Text available at Danish Wikisource
- Original title: Den lille havfrue
- Translator: Mary Howitt
- Country: Denmark
- Language: Danish
- Genres: Fantasy, fairy tale

Publication
- Published in: Fairy Tales Told for Children. First Collection. Third Booklet. 1837. (Eventyr, fortalte for Børn. Første Samling. Tredie Hefte. 1837.)
- Publication type: Fairy tale collection
- Publisher: C. A. Reitzel
- Publication date: 7 April 1837
- Published in English: 1845
- Series: 2525318047

"The Little Mermaid" (Danish: Den lille havfrue), sometimes translated in English as "The Little Sea Maid", is a literary fairy tale written by Danish author Hans Christian Andersen. Originally published in 1837 as part of a collection of fairy tales for children, the story follows the journey of a young mermaid princess who is willing to give up her life in the sea as a mermaid to gain a human soul.

The original story has been the subject of multiple analyses by scholars such as Jacob Bøggild and Pernille Heegaard, as well as the folklorist Maria Tatar. These analyses cover various aspects of the story, from interpreting the themes to discussing why Andersen chose to write a tragic story with a happy ending. It has been adapted to various media, including musical theatre, anime, ballet, opera, and film. There is also a statue portraying the mermaid in Copenhagen, Denmark, where the story was written and first published.

== Plot ==
The Little Mermaid lives in an underwater kingdom with her five older sisters, her grandmother, and her father, the Sea King. She is fascinated by the world above the sea and human beings. When a mermaid turns fifteen, she is permitted to swim to the surface for the first time to catch a glimpse of the world above. One by one, the Mermaid's sisters visit the upper world and share their observations with her. They dislike the world above and are content to remain in the sea.

When the Mermaid turns fifteen, she rises up to the surface, watches a birthday celebration being held on a ship in honor of a prince, and falls in love with him. When a violent storm sinks the ship, the Mermaid saves the prince from drowning and delivers him unconscious to the shore near a temple. There, the Mermaid waits until a young woman from the temple finds him. The prince never sees the Mermaid or realizes it was she who saved his life.

The Mermaid asks her grandmother if humans can live forever. Her grandmother explains that humans have a shorter lifespan than the 300-year lifespan of mermaids, but that they have an eternal soul that lives on in Heaven, while mermaids turn to sea foam when they die. The Mermaid, longing for the prince and an eternal soul, visits the Sea Witch, who offers her a potion which will give her legs but silence her voice. The Witch says that once the Mermaid becomes a human, she will never be able to return to the sea, and she will constantly feel like she is walking on sharp knives, with her feet bleeding terribly. In addition, she will obtain a human soul only if she wins the prince's love and marries him, for then a part of his soul will flow into her. Otherwise, at dawn on the first day after he marries someone else, the Mermaid will die with a broken heart and dissolve into sea foam, ceasing to exist.

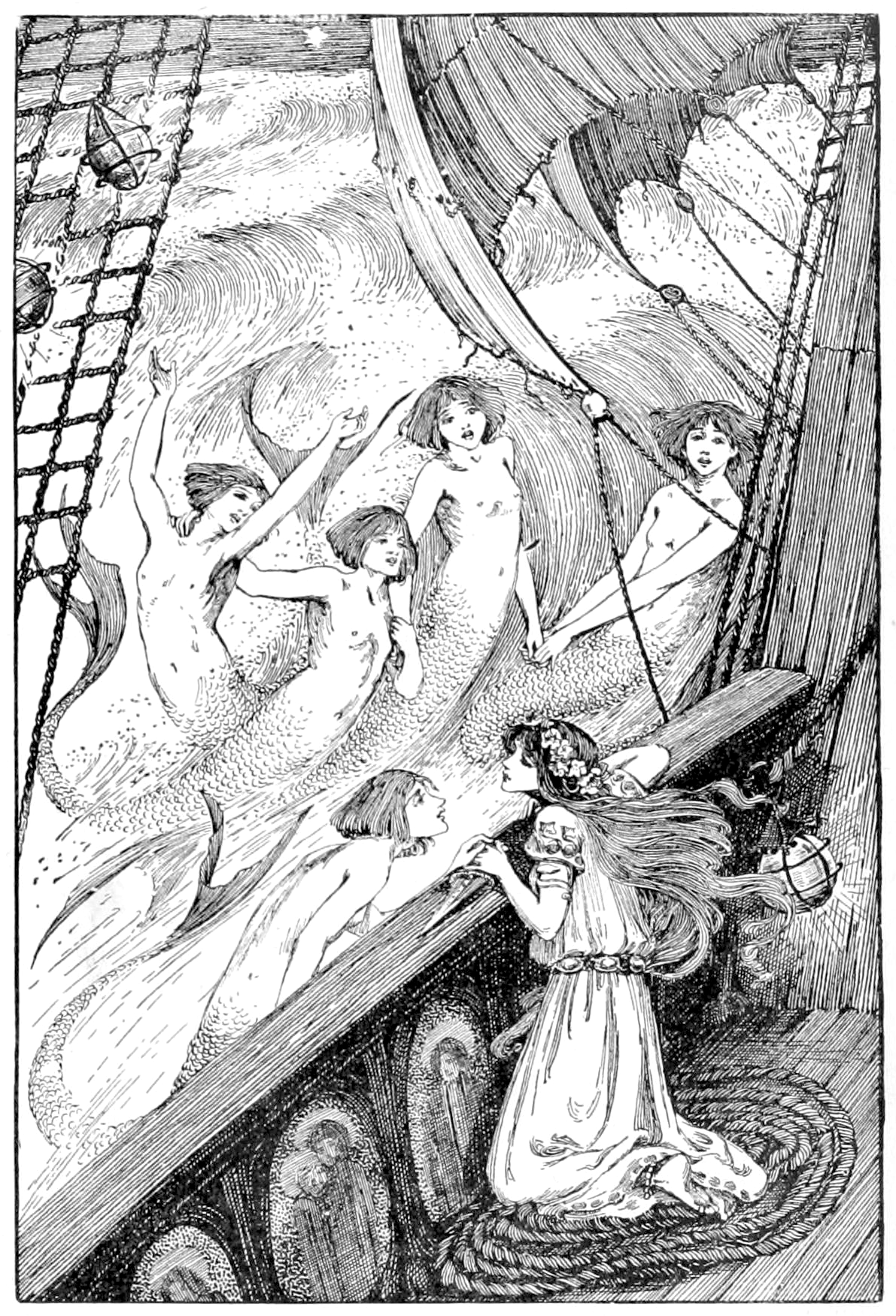
The Little Mermaid's sisters bring her a dagger

The Mermaid takes the potion and swims to the surface near the prince's castle. She drinks the potion, which feels like a sword piercing her body, and she passes out on the shore. She is found by the prince, who is mesmerized by her beauty and grace. After recovering, she becomes his favorite companion. She dances for him, despite suffering excruciating pain with every step. He shares his deepest thoughts and feelings with her but does not fall in love with her.

When the prince's parents encourage him to marry a neighboring princess, he tells the Mermaid he will not because he does not love the princess. He says he can only love the young woman from the temple, because she rescued him. When the prince learns that the princess is the woman from the temple, he declares his love for her, and the royal wedding is announced at once.

The marriage is celebrated aboard a ship, and the Mermaid's heart breaks. She despairs, thinking of the death that awaits her, but before dawn, her sisters arrive and give her a dagger from the Witch. If the Mermaid kills the prince and lets his blood drip onto her feet, she will become a mermaid once more, all her suffering will end, and she will live out her full life in the ocean with her family. However, the Mermaid cannot bring herself to kill the prince, and she throws herself off the ship and into the ocean.

The Mermaid's body dissolves into foam, but instead of ceasing to exist, she turns into an ethereal earthbound spirit, a daughter of the air. While ascending into the atmosphere, she is greeted by other daughters, who also strove to obtain an immortal soul. Because of the Mermaid's sacrifice, she is given a chance to do good deeds for all her life. When her life ends, she will receive a soul and rise up into Heaven.

== Publication ==
"The Little Mermaid" was written by Hans Christian Andersen in 1836 and first published by C.A. Reitzel in Copenhagen on 7 April 1837 in Fairy Tales Told for Children. First Collection. (Danish: Eventyr, fortalte for Børn. Første Samling.), a collection of nine fairy tales by Hans Christian Andersen.

The story was republished on 18 December 1849 as a part of Fairy Tales. 1850 (Eventyr. 1850), and again on 15 December 1862 as a part of the first volume of Fairy Tales and Stories (Eventyr og Historier).

== Critical response ==
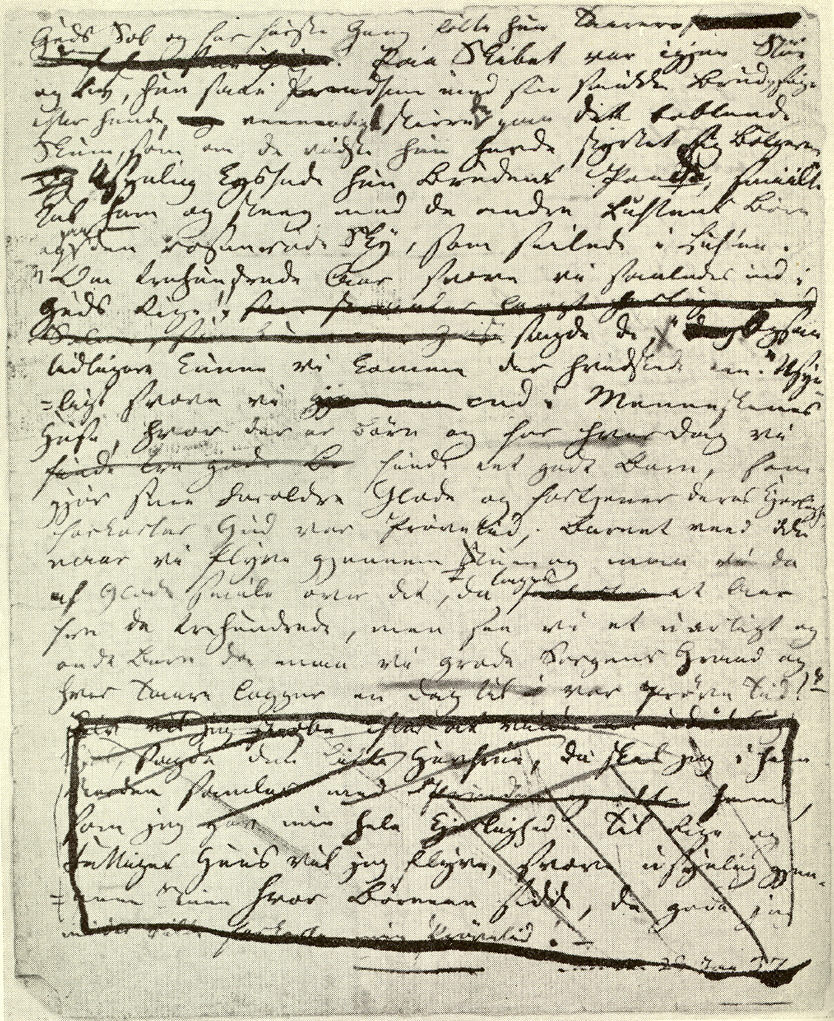
Original manuscript, last page

The ending with the mermaid's death and resurrection caused debate and critique. On the fact that children are told that their good behavior will help the mermaid earn her soul more quickly, but their bad behavior will add days to her time of service, P. L. Travers, author of Mary Poppins and noted folklore commentator, wrote, "a year taken off when a child behaves; a tear shed and a day added whenever a child is naughty? Andersen, this is blackmail. And the children know it and say nothing. There's magnanimity for you."

Other scholars like Jacob Bøggild and Pernille Heegaard notice the ending's shift away from tragedy as well. They point out that the events leading up to the mermaid's death should culminate in tragedy, but that the sudden twist allows the narrative to finish on a hopeful success. Bøggild and Heegaard argue that this disjointed ending was not the result of Andersen's sentimentality and religious beliefs—to which have been attributed his choice to stray from the tragic path in the rest of the narrative. Rather, a conscious choice for ambiguity stemmed from Andersen's skepticism towards idealized physical and religious symbols.

However, other critics including Søren Baggesen and James Massengale have argued that the ending is not tacked on but is a natural part of the story's structure as a religious narrative. The working title of the story was "Daughters of the Air", which are spirits who, as Andersen conceived them, can earn souls by doing three hundred years' worth of good deeds. At the end of the story, one of these spirits explains to the Little Mermaid that they do as many good things for humankind as they are able so that at the end of those years they can receive an immortal soul and "take part in the happiness of mankind". The spirits also explain that because the Little Mermaid refused to kill the Prince and has spent so much time in pain while still doing good things for men, she has "raised [herself] to the spirit-world" and can participate in the three hundred years of good deeds alongside the Daughters of the Air.

Andersen was influenced by Undine, another story of a mermaid gaining a soul through marriage, but he felt that his ending was an improvement. In 1837, shortly after completing his manuscript, Andersen wrote to a friend, "I have not, like de la Motte Fouqué in Undine, allowed the mermaid's acquiring of an immortal soul to depend upon an alien creature, upon the love of a human being. I'm sure that's wrong! It would depend rather much on chance, wouldn't it? I won't accept that sort of thing in this world. I have permitted my mermaid to follow a more natural, more divine path." Andersen was concerned that the story's meanings would appeal best to adults but wrote in the foreword to Fairy Tales Told for Children, "I dare presume, however, that the child will also enjoy it and that the denouement itself, plainly considered, will grip the child."

== Themes and interpretations ==
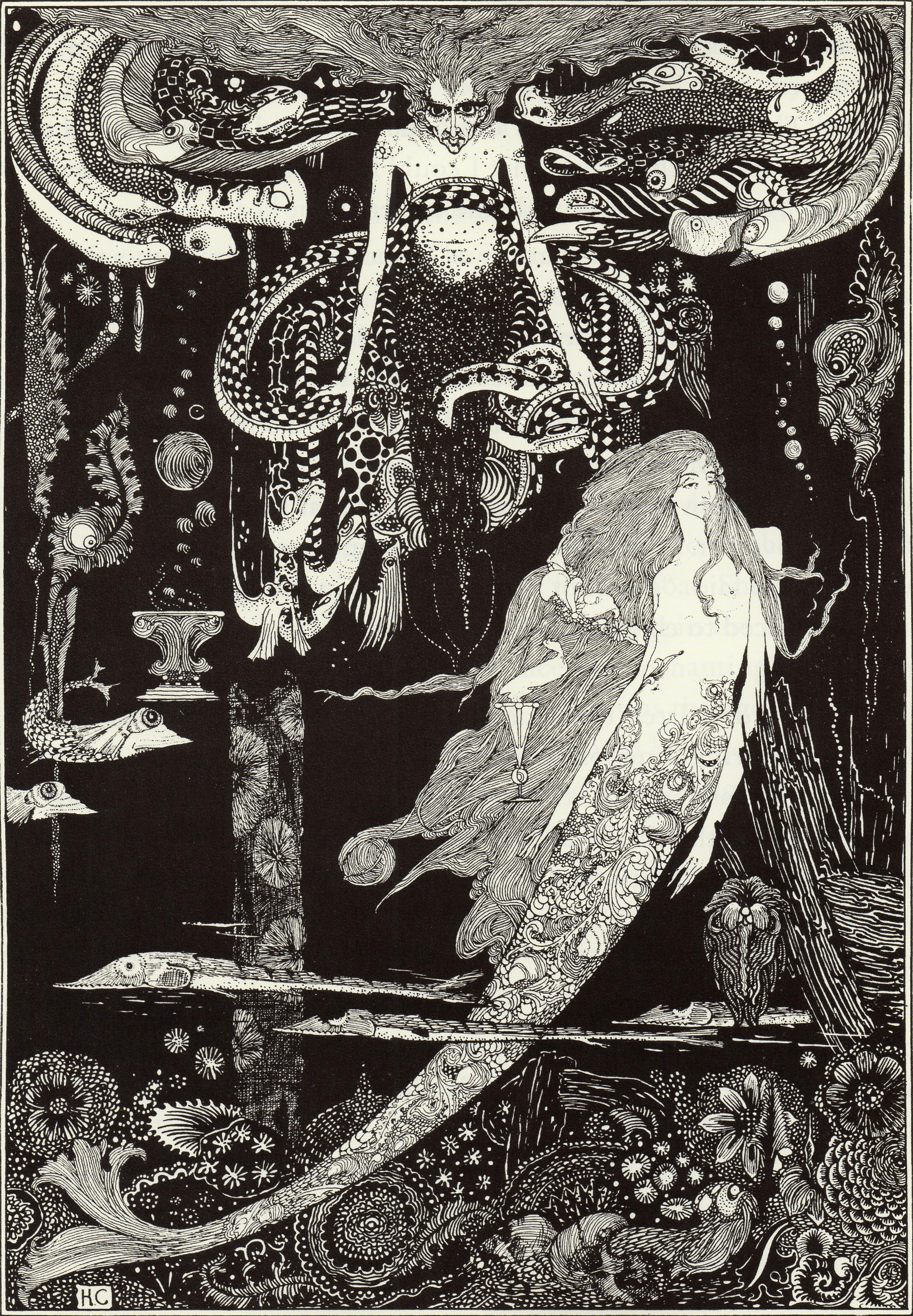
"'I know what you want' said the sea witch", engraving by Harry Clarke

In Maria Tatar's The Annotated Classic Fairy Tales, the transformation of the little mermaid from sea creature to mermaid in human form, and then to a creature of the air, is believed to reflect Andersen's constant engagement with mutability and changes in identity. Tatar also suggests that the Little Mermaid did not give up everything for love alone. Tatar's interpretation of the tale is one that presents a rare heroine with an investigative curiosity which is shown through the mermaid's fascination with the unknown, the forbidden, and her intent on broadening her horizons from the start. Even before she sees the prince, she displays an intense longing to visit the world above the sea through her actions such as: arranging the flowers in her garden into the shape of the sun, listening to her grandmother and sisters' stories of the surface, and peeking in through the window of the prince's cabin during his birthday celebrations. Tatar argues that the mermaid wants, above all, to explore the world and discover things that are beyond what she already knows. The world above seems larger than her own and holds a greater range of possibilities to exercise her adventurous spirit. This is demonstrated in some versions of the story when the prince has a page boy's costume made for her so that she may ride on horseback and explore the land with him. Here, her willingness to cross-dress implies a willingness to transcend gender boundaries and take risks to be able to see the world. Tatar feels this also comments on Andersen's interests in changes in identity.

In her analysis, Virginia Borges concludes that the story contains a theme about love and self-sacrifice and the dangers of accepting abuse or inconsiderate treatment in the name of love.

Alienation, or feeling like an outsider, is also a theme of the tale. The Little Mermaid feels isolated throughout the story and struggles to find her place in the world. She feels that she does not belong in the world under the sea and is disconnected from her own people, but she does not belong in the human world either, where she constantly suffers agonising pain and is treated as an animal or an amusement by the prince.

Susan White interprets the story as the difficult liminal passage of the girl into the order of speech and social symbolism (power, politics, and agency) which is symbolically understood as masculine.

The artist Pen Dalton has made use of Laura Mulvey's interpretation of fetishism in art to link The Little Mermaid to the wearing of fetishistic clothes, and obsessive cosmetic surgery with masculine fears of loss.

The American writer Rictor Norton, in My Dear Boy: Gay Love Letters through the Centuries, and the German scholar Heinrich Detering, in Das offene Geheimnis (The Open Secret), theorize that The Little Mermaid was written as a love letter by Hans Christian Andersen to Edvard Collin. This is based on a letter Andersen wrote to Collin, upon hearing of Collin's engagement to a young woman, around the same time that the Little Mermaid was written. Andersen wrote "I languish for you as for a pretty Calabrian wench ... my sentiments for you are those of a woman. The femininity of my nature and our friendship must remain a mystery." Andersen also sent the original story to Collin. Norton interprets the correspondence as a declaration of Andersen's homosexual love for Collin and describes The Little Mermaid as an allegory for Andersen's life.

== Adaptations ==
=== NBC television series ===
In 1958, NBC began airing a new television show titled Shirley Temple's Storybook, an American children's anthology series that was hosted and narrated by actress Shirley Temple. The series features adaptations of fairy tales like Mother Goose and other family-oriented stories performed by well-known actors. The first season of sixteen black-and-white and colored episodes aired on NBC between 12 January 1958, and 21 December 1958, as Shirley Temple's Storybook. Thirteen episodes of the first season re-ran on ABC beginning on 12 January 1959. The second season of twenty-five color episodes aired on NBC as The Shirley Temple Show between 18 September 1960, and 16 July 1961 in much the same format that it had under its original title.

The show aired their adaptation of The Little Mermaid on 5 March 1961 as episode 22 during the show's second season. Shirley Temple herself played the mermaid. Unlike the original story, the mermaid does not give up her voice to become human, but she still fails to win the prince's heart when he falls in love with the princess who found him. In the end, when she cannot bring herself to kill the prince with the dagger, she prepares to throw herself into the sea. Neptune himself intervenes and says that for her selfless act, she has earned the right to become a mermaid again and rejoin her family, giving the story a happy ending.

=== Soviet feature film ===
This 1976 Russian feature film was directed by Vladimir Bychkov and starred Viktoriya Novikova as the mermaid. The story is set in the 13th century. The mermaid saves the prince from drowning, after other mermaids mesmerize the sailors into crashing their ship onto the rocks. The prince is saved by a local princess under whose care he recovers. The mermaid seeks to marry the prince. A traveling handyman tries to help the mermaid in her love. He finds a local witch who changes her tail into legs in exchange for her hair. The prince marries the local princess and the mermaid is destined to die on the same day. The traveling handyman challenges the prince to a fight and is killed. His sacrifice spares the mermaid from death and her soul becomes eternal.

=== Faerie Tale Theatre ===
Filmed in 1987, this installment of Shelley Duvall's Faerie Tale Theatre gives the Little Mermaid the name "Pearl." She lives under the sea with her father the king and her two older sisters.

On her twenty-first birthday, she goes to the surface and sees a prince on a ship and falls in love with him while singing to him from the sea. Later, when the ship catches fire and the prince is thrown into the sea, Pearl rescues him and brings him to shore. There, she revives him and they kiss though he is not fully conscious and for him it is as a dream. Pearl must return to the sea before he is fully awake.

Pearl tells her family what happened and that she's in love with a mortal. They try to talk her out of it, but instead she goes to see the Sea Witch- who also tries to talk her out of it. Pearl is determined. She exchanges her voice for legs. If she cannot win the prince's love, she will turn into sea foam the morning after he weds another.

Meanwhile the prince, still on the beach where Pearl brought him, is found by a princess of a neighboring kingdom, Amelia. The prince transfers his feelings of love for Pearl onto her, believing she is his rescuer, and they begin a courtship that they find each of their fathers had hoped would happen so they could conjoin their kingdoms.

The prince and Amelia are out walking when they come across Pearl, naked and newly-legged, on the shore. They bring her into the castle and learn she's mute, but charming.

Pearl and the Prince kiss, but he apologizes. Eventually Amelia tells the Prince she knows Pearl is in love with him and asks him to speak to her. The Prince asks Pearl and she indicated to him it's true. The Prince tells her he loves her, but is not in love with her, and that he is marrying Amelia. Pearl is heartbroken.

After The Prince weds Amelia, Pearl's sisters come to the surface and announce they've traded their hair to the sea witch in exchange for a dagger. Pearl must use it to kill the Prince and let his blood drip on her feet. Then, she will become a mermaid again and can go on living as she was.

Pearl takes the dagger but cannot bring herself to use it because she loves the Prince too deeply. Her body then disappears as expected but because she was pure of heart she did not disappear into sea foam but instead became a spirit of the air and watched over the royal couple for the rest of their long, happy lives.

=== Disney's animated film ===
Disney's The Little Mermaid is a 1989 American animated musical fantasy romance film produced by Walt Disney Feature Animation and distributed by Buena Vista Pictures Distribution. Loosely based on the original tale, the 1989 Disney film tells the story of a mermaid princess named Ariel, who dreams of becoming human, especially after falling in love with a human prince named Eric. Written, produced, and directed by Ron Clements and John Musker, with music by Alan Menken and Howard Ashman (who also served as a co-producer), the film features the voices of Jodi Benson, Christopher Daniel Barnes, and Pat Carroll among others.

The Little Mermaid was originally planned as part of one of Walt Disney's earliest feature films, a proposed package film featuring vignettes of Hans Christian Andersen tales. Development started in the late 1930s but was delayed due to various circumstances. In 1985, Ron Clements became interested in a film adaptation of The Little Mermaid while he was serving as a director on The Great Mouse Detective (1986). Clements discovered the Hans Christian Andersen fairy tale while browsing through a bookstore. Believing the story provided an "ideal basis" for an animated feature film and keen on creating a film that took place underwater, Clements wrote and presented a two-page treatment of Mermaid to Disney CEO Jeffrey Katzenberg, who approved of the idea for possible development the next day. While in production in the 1980s, the staff by chance found the original story and visual development work done by Kay Nielsen for Disney's proposed 1930s Andersen feature. Many of the changes made by the staff in the 1930s to Hans Christian Andersen's original story were coincidentally the same as the changes made by Disney writers in the 1980s.

In 2023, the 1989 film was adapted into a live-action remake.

== Pop culture ==
=== The Little Mermaid statue ===
The Little Mermaid statue in Copenhagen, Denmark

A statue of The Little Mermaid sits on a rock in the Copenhagen harbor in Langelinie. This small and unimposing statue is a Copenhagen icon and tourist attraction.

The statue was commissioned in 1909 by Carl Jacobsen, son of the founder of Carlsberg, after he had been fascinated by a ballet based on the fairy tale. The sculptor Edward Eriksen created the statue, which was unveiled on 23 August 1913. His wife, Eline Eriksen, was the model for the body. Ellen Price, the ballerina who danced the Little Mermaid in the 1909 Royal Danish Ballet production, was the model for the head and face. The statue has been severely vandalized several times.

In May 2010, it was moved from its Copenhagen harbor emplacement for the first time ever for transport to Expo 2010 in Shanghai, where it remained until 20 November.

=== The Little Mermaid statue in the Principality of Monaco ===
A statue of The Little Mermaid looks out over Larvotto beach in Monaco. She was created in 2000 by Kristian Dahlgard, with several layers of metal, in homage to the Danes who live in Monaco and for the late Prince Rainier III to mark the 50th year of his reign.

== See also ==
- Mermaids in popular culture
