= List of ballets by August Bournonville =

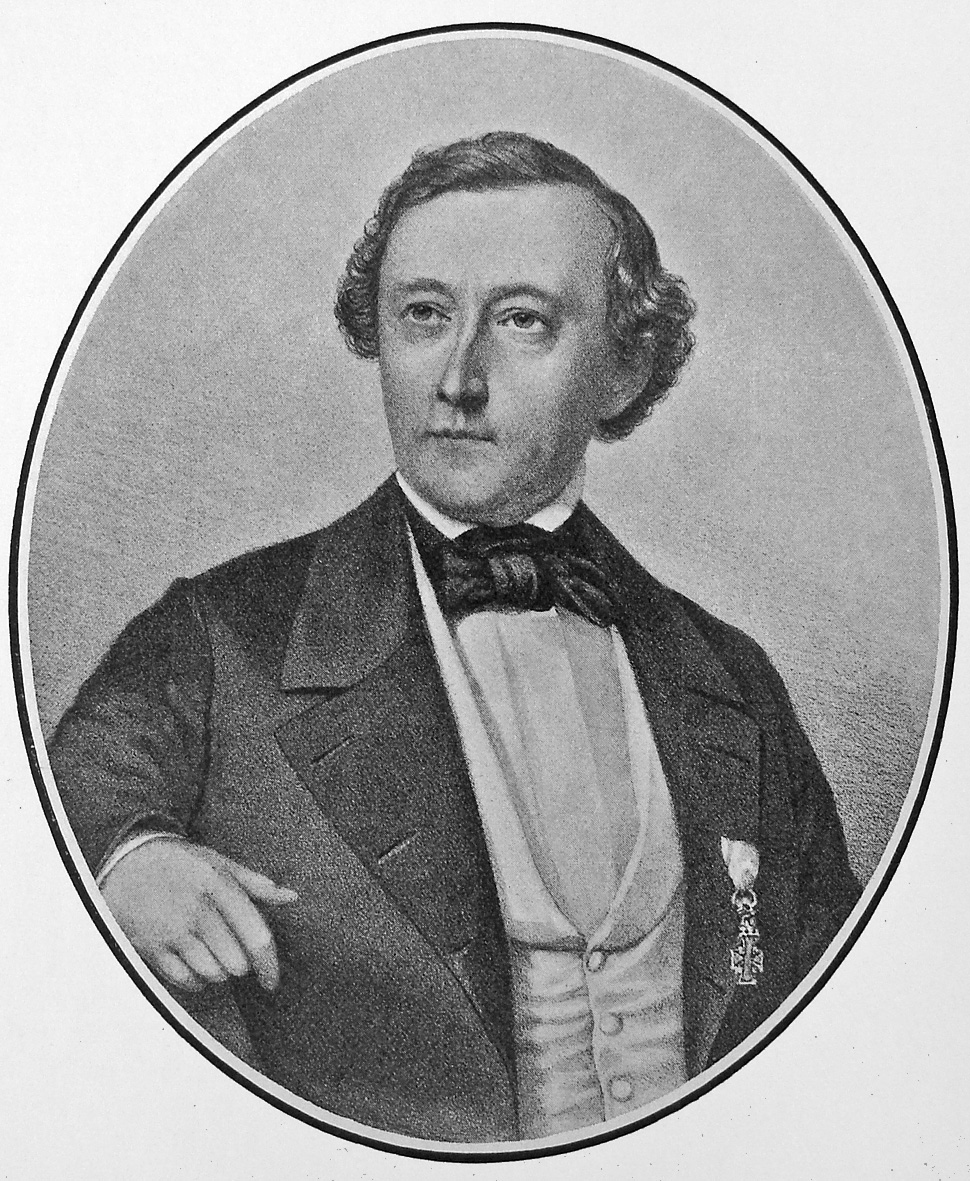
August Bournonville

The following is a list of ballets by Danish ballet master and choreographer August Bournonville (1805–1879).

63 Ballets

1829

- Acclaim to the Graces (Gratiernes Hyldning). Divertissement. Music: M.E. Caraffa, W.R. v. Gallemberg, and F. Sor. First performed on Tuesday, 01-09-1829.
- The Night Shadow La Somnambule (Søvngængersken). Ballet in three acts based on a ballet by J. Aumer. Music: F. Herold. First performed on Monday, 21-09-1829.
- Soldier and Peasant (Soldat og Bonde). Pantomime idyll in one act. Composer and arranger: Philip Ludvig Keck. First performed on Tuesday, 13-10-1829.

1830

- Duke of Vendome Pager Les Pages du Duc de Vendôme (Hertugen af Vendômes Pager). Pantomime ballet in two acts. Music: A. Gyrowetz. First performed on Friday, 03-09-1830.
- Paul and Virginia (Paul og Virginie). Pantomime ballet in three acts. Music: Rodolphe Kreutzer. First performed on Friday, 29-10-1830.

1831

- Victor's Wedding, or The Ancestral House (A Sequel to "Soldier and Peasant") (Victors Bryllup eller Fædrene-Arnen (Fortsættelse of "Soldat og Bonde")). Ballet in one act. Music: Philip Ludvig Keck. First performed on Saturday, 23-04-1831.

1832

- Faust. Romantic ballet in three acts. Composer and arranger: Philip Ludvig Keck. First performed on Wednesday, 25-04-1832.

1833

- The Veteran, or the Hospitable House (Veteranen eller det Gæstfrie Tag). Idyllic ballet in one act. Music: Ludvig Zinck. First performed on Tuesday, 29-01-1833.
- Romeo and Juliet (Romeo og Giulietta). Tragic ballet in five acts by Vincenzo Galeotti and August Bournonville made his own choreographer. Music: C. Schall. songs of Niels Thoroup Bruun. First performed on Saturday, 27-04-1833.

1834

- Nina, ou la Folle par amour Nina, or The Girl Driven Mad by Love, (Nina eller den Vanvittige af Kærlighed). Pantomime ballet in two acts. Music: L. de Persuis. A script by: Louis J. Milon. First performed on Tuesday, 30-09-1834.

1835

- The Tyroleans (Tyrolese). Idyllic ballet in one act. Music: J.F. Frøhlich (and Rossini). First performed on Friday, 06-03-1835.
- Yelva Drama in 2 Departments of Eugène Scribe, Ferdinand de Villeneuve and Desvergers (Yelva, ou L'Orpheline rousse), translated by Castelli Translation of Th. Overskou, the mimic: Paul Diderich Muth-Rasmussen. First performed on Tuesday, 09-06-1835.
- Valdemar (Valdemar). Romantic ballet in four acts. Music: J.F. Frøhlich. First performed on Wednesday, 28-10-1835.

1836

- La Sylphide (Sylfiden). Romantic ballet in two acts. Music: Løvenskiold. (There are other choreographies by Adolphe Nourrit (1802-1839) and by Filippo Taglioni (1777-1871). First performed on Tuesday, 29-11-1836.

1837

- Don Quixote by Camacho's Wedding (Don Quixote ved Camachos Bryllup). Pantomime ballet in three acts. Arranger: Ludvig Zinck . It was performed only two times: first performance was on Friday, 24-02-1837 and second was on Saturday, 25-02-1837.

1838

- Hertha's Offering (Herthas Offer). Divertissement. Arranger: J.F. Frøhlich. First performed on Monday, 29-01-1838.
- Imagination Island (Fantasiens ø eller fra Kinas Kyst or Fantasien Ø). Romantic ballet in two acts and a final tableau. Music by various of composers: J.F. Bredal, Johan Peter Emilius Hartmann, Edvard Helsted, Herman Løvenskiold, H.S. Paulli and Ludvig Zinck. First performed on Sunday, 28-10-1838.

1839

- The Festival in Albano (Festen i Albano). Idyllic ballet in one act. Music: J.F. Frøhlich. First performed on Monday, 28-10-1839.

1840

- National Muses or Fatherland Muser (Fædrelandets Muser). Pantomime prelude to one act with prologue. Composers and arrangers: J.F. Frøhlich and Niels W. Gade. First performed on Friday, 20-03-1840.
- Toreador (Toréadoren). Idyllic ballet in two acts. Composer and arranger: Edvard Helsted. First performed on Friday, 27-11-1840.

1842

- Naples, or The Fisherman and His Bride (Napoli eller Fiskeren og Hans Brud). Romantic ballet in three acts. Music: H.S. Paulli, Edvard Helsted, Niels W. Gade and [the finale to Act 3] Hans Lumbye. First performed on Tuesday, 29-03-1842.
- Polka Militaire (Military Polka) Polka militaire (Militærpolka). Divertissement. Music: Hans Lumbye. First performed on Tuesday, 01-11-1842.

1843

- The Childhood of Erik Menved (Erik Menveds Barndom). Romantic ballet in four acts. Music: J.F. Frøhlich. First performed on Thursday, 12-01-1843.

1844

- Bellmanor Polish dance on Grönalund or The Dance at Grønalund (Bellman eller Polskdansen paa Grønalund). Ballet vaudeville in one act. Music: Carl Michael Bellman and H.S. Paulli. First performed on Monday, 03-06-1844.
- A Children's Party (En Børnefest). Divertissement. Composer and arranger by H.S. Paulli. First performed on Wednesday, 23-10-1844. (This ballet was performed only once).
- Hamburger Dans pas de deux. Music: H.C. Lumbye. First performed in 1844.

1845

- Kirsten Piil, or Two Mid-Summer Festivals (Kirsten Piil eller To Midsommerfester). Romantic ballet in three acts. Music: Edvard Helsted. First performed on Wednesday, 26-02-1845.
- Rafael. Romantic ballet in 6 Tableaux. Music: J.F. Frøhlich. First performed on Friday, 30-05-1845.

1846

- Polacca Guerriera. Divertissement. Pas de deux. Music: H.C. Lumbye. First performed on Wednesday, 25-04-1832.

1847

- The new Penelope, or Spring Festival in Athens (Den Nye Penelope eller Foraarsfesten i Athen). Ballet in two acts. Music: Herman Løvenskiold. First performed on Tuesday, 26-01-1847.
- Maritana. Romantic danse scene. Music: H.C. Lumbye. First performed in 1847.
- The White Rose, or Summer in Brittany (Den Hvide Rose eller Sommeren i Bretagne). Ballet in one act. Composer and arranger: H.S. Paulli. First performed on Monday, 20-09-1847.

1848

- Old Memories or A Laterna Magica (Gamle Minder). Ballet in one act. Music: E. Helsted. First performed on Monday, 18-12-1848.

1849

- Le Conservatoire, or A Marriage by Advertisement (Konservatoriet eller et Avisfrieri). Vaudeville ballet in two acts. Music: Holger Simon Paulli. First performed on Sunday, 06-05-1849.

1850

- The Irresistible or Psyche. Divertissement. Music by Hans Lumbye. First performed on Sunday, 03-02-1850.

1851

- The Kermesse in Bruges, or The Three Gifts (Kermessen i Brügge). Romantic ballet in three acts. Music: Holger Simon Paulli. First performed on Friday, 04-04-1851.
- Love prophecies (Kærligheds Spaadomme). Divertissement. Music by HS Paulli. First performed on Tuesday, 04-11-1851.

1852

- Zulma, or Crystal Palace. Ballet in three acts. Music by H.S. Paulli. First performed on Wednesday, 14-04-1852.

1853

- Bridal Movements in Hardanger (Brudefærden i Hardanger). Ballet in two acts. Music by H.S. Paulli. First performed on Friday, 04-03-1853.

1854

- A Folk Tale (Et Folkesagn). Ballet in three acts. Music: Johan Peter Emilius Hartmann and Niels W. Gade. First performed on Monday, 20-03-1854.

1855

- Abdallah, Gazelle from Bassora (Abdallah, eller Gazellen fra Bassora). Music by H.S. Paulli. First performed on Friday, 30-03-1855.
- Sailor Homecoming (Matrosens Hjemkomst). Divertissement. First performed on Sunday, 23-09-1855.

1856

- La Ventana. Divertissement. Music composed and arranged by Hans Lumbye and William Holm. First performed on Monday, 06-10-1856.
- The serious girl (Den alvorlige Pige). Divertissement. Music by T.H.E. Lincke. First performed on Sunday, 23-11-1856.

1857

- In the Carpathians (I Karpatherne). Ballet in three acts. Music by H.S. Paulli. First performed on Wednesday, 04-03-1857.

1858

- The Flower Festival in Genzano (Blomsterfesten i Genzano). Ballet in one act. Music: Edvard Helsted and Holger Simon Paulli. First performed n Sunday, 19-12-1858.

1859

- Mountain living room (Fjeldstuen). Pantomime ballet in three Tableaux. Music by August Winding and Emil Hartmann. First performed on Friday, 13-05-1859 (28 performances), last one 13-05-1878

1860

- Far from Denmark (Fjernt fra Danmark). Vaudeville ballet in two acts. Music by Joseph Glæser and (finale) O.F. Lincke. First performed on Friday, 20-04-1860.

1861

- Valkyrie or Valkyrien. Ballet in four acts. Music by Johan Peter Emilius Hartmann. First performed on Friday, 13-09-1861.

1866

- Ponte Molle or An Artist Guild in Rome or Pontemolle. Vaudeville ballet in two Tableaux. Music by William Holm and T.H.E. Lincke. First performed on Wednesday, 11-04-1866.

1867

- Il trovatore (Trubaduren). Divertissement from the opera Il trovatore, music by Giuseppe Verdi, Hans Lumbye and anonymous Spanish composer. First performed on Friday, 25-01-1867.

1868

- Thrymskviden. Ballet in four acts. Music by Johan Peter Emilius Hartmann. First performed on Friday, 21-02-1868.

1870

- Cort Adeler in Venice (Cort Adeler i Venedig). Ballet in three acts and a conclusion Tableau. Music by Peter Heise. First performed on Friday, 14-01-1870.
- Scandinavian Quadrille (Skandinavisk Quadrille). Divertissement. Music by Hans Lumbye. First performed on Sunday, 06-02-1870.

1871

- King's Volunteers on Amager (Livjægerne paa Amager). Vaudeville ballet in one act. Music by William Holm. First performed on Sunday, 19-02-1871.
- An Adventure in Pictures (Et Eventyr i Billeder). Ballet in three acts. Music by William Holm. First performed on Tuesday, 26-12-1871.

1873

- Mandarinens daughters (Mandarinens Døtre). Divertissement. Music by William Holm. First performed on Wednesday, 23-04-1873.

1874

- Weyse Memorial (Weyses Minde). Aftermath of Tableaux. Music by William Holm. First performed on Thursday, 05-03-1874.
- Farewell to the old theater (Farvel til det gamle Teater). First performed on Monday, 01-06-1874. (This ballet was performed only one time).

1875

- Flower Festival in Genzano (Blomsterfesten i Genzano). Music by Edvard Helsted and H.S. Paulli. First performed on Friday, 01-01-1875.
- Arkona. Ballet in four acts. Music by Johan Peter Emilius Hartmann. First performed on Friday, 07-05-1875.
- From the last century (Fra det forrige Aarhundrede). Divertissement. Music arranged by W. Holm. First performed on Sunday, 31-10-1875.

1876

- From Siberia to Moscow (Fra Sibirien til Moskov). Ballet in two acts. Music by C.C. Moeller. First performed on Thursday, 07-12-1876.

1878

- The Soldier (Den tapre Landsoldat). Suite of five Tableaux, Peter Faber's memorial. Music by C.C. Moeller. First performed on Sunday, 10-03-1878. (This ballet was performed only twice).

1879

- Memory's garland of Denmark's great poet (Mindets Krans for Danmarks store Digter). Suite of four Tableaux, with introduction written by Sophus Schandorph. Music arranged by C.C. Moeller. First performed on Friday, 14-11-1879.

(This ballet was performed only twice; it was the last choreography of August Bournonville before he died).
