= Anne Marie Vessel Schlüter =

Danish ballet dancer

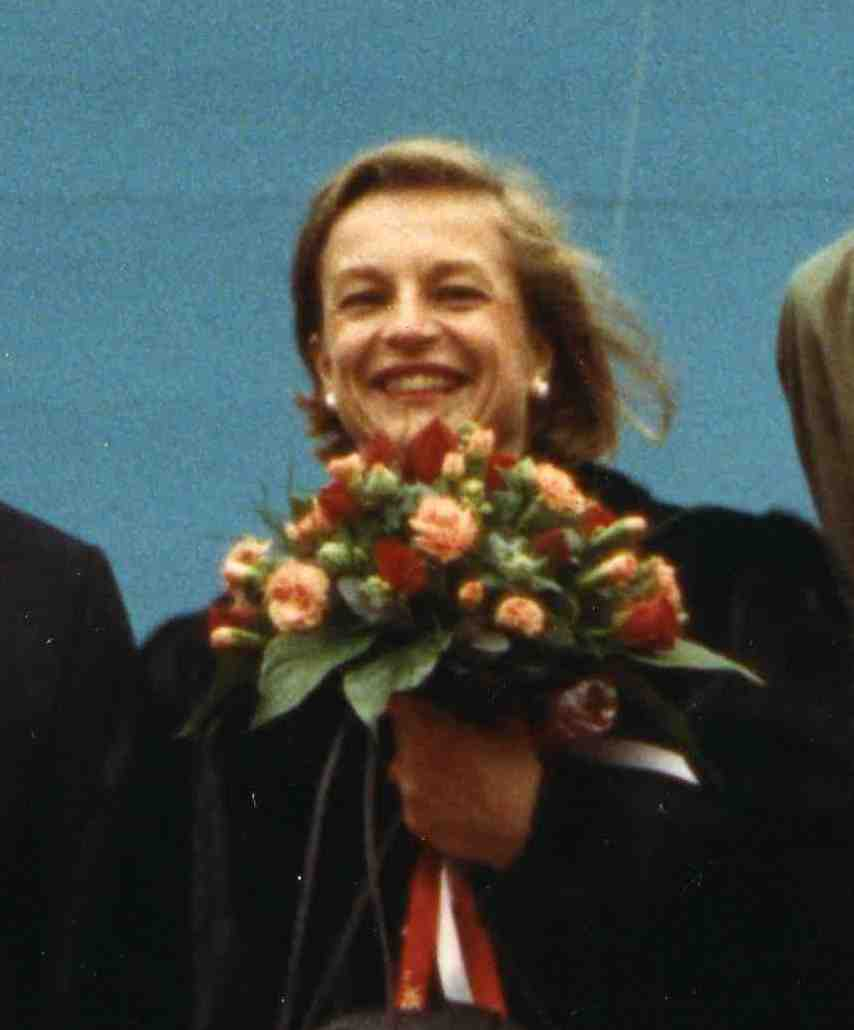
Anne Marie Vessel (1990)

Anne Marie Vessel Schlüter (born 1 May 1949) is a Danish ballet dancer who joined the Royal Danish Ballet in 1965. After retiring from the stage in 1988, she headed the Royal Danish Theatre's ballet school until 2006, maintaining the traditional Danish style of August Bournonville. In 1989 she married Poul Schlüter who served as Prime Minister of Denmark from 1982 to 1993.

== Biography ==
Born on 1 May 1949 in Copenhagen, Anne Marie Vessel is the daughter of the ballet dancer Tove Schultz and the ballet director Poul Vessel Christensen. She first performed on the stage of the Royal Theatre when she was just four in the opera Madame Butterfly. When she was seven, she became a pupil at the Royal Danish Ballet school. That year her parents divorced but maintained a friendly relationship, contributing to her pleasant upbringing. She danced her first solo part while still a student in Elsa-Marianne von Rosen's Jomfrukilden. She also undertook study trips to Cannes and Paris.

As a dancer, she performed widely in Bournonville's works, especially Napoli, Blomsterfesten i Genzano, Konservatoriet, Sylfiden, Fjernt fra Danmark and Kermessen i Brügge, but she also took many other leading roles including Swanhilda in Coppélia, Helena in John Neumeier's A Midsummer Night's Dream, Clara in The Nutcracker and both the pupil and the pianist in Flemming Flindt's The Lesson.

In 1988, she retired from the stage to join the Royal Theatre's ballet school where she served as director until 2006. In 1991, together with Frank Andersen, she produced Et Folkesagn with Queen Margrethe's scenography. She continued to give lessons at the ballet school and acted as ballet instructor at the Royal Theatre. When she was 64, she embarked on choreography with a solo for the character dancer Lis Jeppesen in 242 år i trikot. As of May 2019, Vessel Schlüter is still active in the theatre, with plans for a further production of Et Folkesagn.

== Personal life ==
From 1976-1982 she was married to Kim Ry Andersen, lawyer at the Danish Ministry of Justice and Danish Ministry of Culture, deputy director at the Royal Theater Copenhagen. Then her partner was the ballet dancer Alexander Kølpin, who was 16 years her junior. When she was 36 and Kølpin was 19, she gave birth to Niclas Vessel who is now an actor.

On 21 July 1989 she married Poul Schlüter who was then the Prime Minister of Denmark.
