= Susanne Grinder =

Danish ballet dancer (born 1981)

Susanne Grinder (born November 1981) is a Danish ballet dancer. She joined the Royal Danish Ballet in 1998, becoming a principal dancer in 2012.

== Early life ==
Born in Helsingør in 1981, her father is a bank manager, her mother a graduate in Danish and history of art. She was brought up in Snekkersten in the north of Zealand as the youngest of four children. Like her sister Anne Mie, she went to local ballet classes. Noticing her talent, the teacher recommended she should attend the Royal Danish Ballet School where she was admitted at the age of seven.

== Career ==
After graduating from the ballet school, she became an apprentice at the Royal Danish Ballet in 1998, a member of the corps in 2000, a soloist in 2005 and in 2010 she was promoted to principal dancer after debuting as Odette/Odile in Swan Lake. Other leading roles include Aurora in The Sleeping Beauty, Marguerite in Neumeier's Lady of the Camellias and Juliet in Romeo and Juliet. She has also starred in August Bournonville's ballets, as Sylphide in La Sylphide, Teresina in Napoli , Hilda in A Folk Tale and Eleonora in The Kermesse in Bruges. Other highlights have included the title role in Giselle and Nikiya in La Bayadère. She has performed abroad in Spain, Italy, France, Russia, Germany and the United States.

When she was 26, Grinder contracted a serious illness which proved to be Lemierre's syndrome. As a result, it was a year before she could return to the stage.
