= Flower Festival in Genzano =

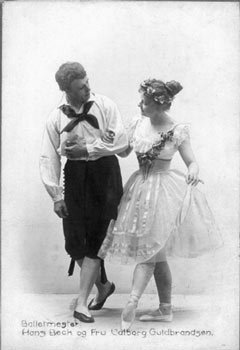
Hans Beck and Valborg Borchsenius, c. 1900

The Flower Festival in Genzano (Danish: Blomsterfesten i Genzano) is a one-act ballet by Danish choreographer and ballet master August Bournonville (1805–1879). Bournonville created the work for Denmark's Royal Ballet on December 19, 1858, at the Royal Danish Theatre, on the basis of Danes' general enthusiasm for Italy. The libretto, which is adapted from a tale in Impressions de voyage by Alexandre Dumas, tells the story of a pair of young lovers, Rosa and Paolo, which alludes to the festival still celebrated each June in Genzano, Italy. The music is by Edvard Helsted and Holger Simon Paulli.

Bournonville was a dancer, choreographer, ballet teacher and director. He was son of the dancer and French ballet master Antoine Bournonville, who was a disciple of the great Noverre. Auguste was born in Copenhagen in 1805, studied with his father, and completed his training in France—with Vestris, the last virtuoso of the French classical style—before becoming a star of the Paris opera.

Bournonville's contributions to the development of romantic ballet, in the course of his long reign as head of the Royal Danish Ballet, far outweighed French influence. He created an entire balletic school and style, including a repertoire of more than 50 ballets, most noted for their strong characters, naturalistic (vs. exaggerated) movement, and exotic locales.

== Background ==
The ballet premiered on 19 December 1858 in Copenhagen and was danced in its entirety by Denmark's Royal Ballet until 1929, when it was dropped from the repertoire. It is considered one of Bournonville's most perfect compositions. It has to be seen in the Festival of Flowers in Genzano which is a transition to naturalism (one of the stages of Auguste's style) and is characterized as a masterpiece of Bournonville's international virtuosity, so that it is a clear example of the Danish style, with a very strong and quite good technique, giving greater importance to the feet. This is why he made use of the vividness and variety of the jumps, the softness of the feet, the speed and brilliance of the small battery. The original ballet disappeared shortly after its premiere, but in 1875, Bournonville made a divertissement, in which he kept the pas de deux he had used in the montage he had already made for the Vienna Festival of Flowers. This remained in the repertoire until 1929 but in 1949 Harald Lander (director of the Royal Ballet) took it to the stage. That is why the entire ballet is lost but the fragment remains. It is considered one of Bournonville's most perfect compositions. It is often performed in ballet finery to show the Bournonville style.

== Music ==
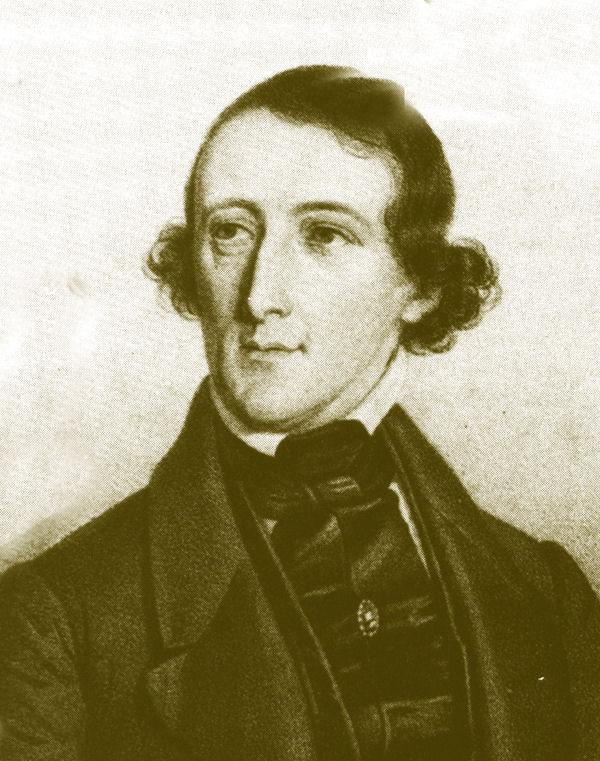
Bournonville, 1841.

The so-called Flower Festival in Genzano pas de deux has become an extremely popular repertory piece with ballet companies and is often utilized in whole or in part by dancers on the ballet competition circuit. The music of this pas de deux is often erroneously credited to Holger Simon Pauli and/or Eduard Helsted in modern theatre programs, films, etc. The true origins of this famous pas de deux stem from an 1842 staging of Bournonville's Napoli for the ballet of the Kärntnertortheater in Vienna. For this production, the danseur Lorenzo Vienna—who performed the principal role of Gennaro in Napoli—created a pas de deux for the third act to new music by the Austrian composer Matthias Strebinger (1807–1874). Bournonville then added the pas de deux to the full-length The Flower Festival in Genzano and the composer of that work, Holger Simon Pauli, adapted Strebinger's music accordingly. For this reason some current companies sometimes insert the pas de deux of Festival de Flores in Genzano in the pas de deux de six of Napoli. Although it is believed that the music of the pas de deux is from the Austrian composer Strebinger, when passing from Napoli it was reorchestrated by Paulli, since he, along with Helsted, had been the authors of the original Genzano Flower Festival, and that is why he continues have attributed to him the authorship of the piece.

The entrée of the pas de deux opens with an episode for solo violin, followed by a polka-like section. After the adage follows the male variation—this is set to a waltz taken from Adolphe Adam's score for Joseph Mazilier's 1845 ballet Le Diable à quatre. The series of relatively short, tuneful passages continues and the pas de deux concludes with a characteristic coda. The music is completely representative of ballet music from the period. The decoration was designed by Messrs, Christensen and Lund.

Regarding the performance of the work, it should be mentioned that the dancer performs a small gargouillade and her round of petit manège, with four grand jetés in the first arabesque at the end of the solo; also, the repeated series of fast relevés at the tip in his second solo. All this is part of the characteristic Bournonville style that uses few familiar steps. A small circle is performed four times by the couple, with the man holding the woman in a low inclined position and she jumps right while doing fast jambe ronds. There is also a game of flirtation between the couple at the beginning of the coda, a fact that is not found in any other Bournonville choreography. Another element that it is not usual for Bournonville to use it is the fragment where she is held by the dancer arriving at the position of first arabesque, and then turns to the left which rotates in avant arabesque and then she turns again to return to the correct first arabesque, it is not a sequence that usually found in any of the other Bournonville choreographies. In the two solos of the man the soloists perform steps that use the strong rhythms of the music. However, in the man's first solo we observe that he only follows direct lines (performs a diagonal and then moves in parallel) and is very simple in the use of the stage. The man's second solo is perhaps the only part that is totally in Bournonville's best known style. It is not known which dancers performed the first Festival of Flowers in Genzano, but however there are old films in which the rescued pas de deux is shown.

== See also ==
- List of ballets by August Bournonville
