= Lis Jeppesen =

Danish ballet dancer

Lis Jeppesen (born 5 April 1956) is a Danish ballet dancer who began to dance for the Royal Danish Ballet in 1974, becoming a soloist in 1980. She has frequently been acclaimed in the title role of Giselle and has taken leading roles in Bournonville's A Folk Tale, La Sylphide and Napoli. She completed her dancing career in 1998 but has continued to take character roles.

== Biography ==
Born in the Vanløse district of Copenhagen on 5 April 1956, Lis Jeppesen is the daughter of the merchant Helvinn Emil Schørring J. (1915–1975) and Alice Gunna Johansen (born 1919). From an early age she demonstrated her talent as a dancer, taking the role of Columbine in the Tivoli Concert Hall when she was only six years old. She entered the Royal Danish Ballet School in 1963, joined the company in 1974 and became a solo dancer in 1980.

Her first important role was in 1974, when just 17, she performed in Rudi van Dantzig's Monument for a Dead Boy. Politiken's critic Ebbe Mørk welcomed her "strong and sharp" performance. In 1977, she took the role of Clara in Flemming Flindt's The Nutcracker, impressing the audience with her large lively eyes.

In 1979, Jeppesen starred in two major roles, taking the title roles in Erik Bruhn's Giselle and in Bounonville's La Sylphide. The following year, she was promoted to the rank of soloist, taking on a series of key roles in the 1980s, including Teresina in Napoli, Svanilda in Coppelia and Elenora in The Kermesse in Bruges. Following a New York performance in June 1982, her Swanilda received special acclaim from Anna Kisselgoff of The New York Times who commented on her "tenderness and charm simply not see anywhere else" and her "puffed-cheek and wide-eyed hilarity".

On 26 September 1987, Jeppesen married Jan Boris Pedersen with whom she has two children: Amalie (1987) and Mathilde (1994). In 1998, she retired from active dancing after performing for 26 years. She has since been employed as a character dancer and coach.

== Awards ==
In addition to earlier awards, in 1989 Jeppesen was honoured as a Knight of the Order of the Dannebrog.
