= Snekkersten =

Town in Helsingør, Denmark

Coordinates: 56°00′N 12°36′E

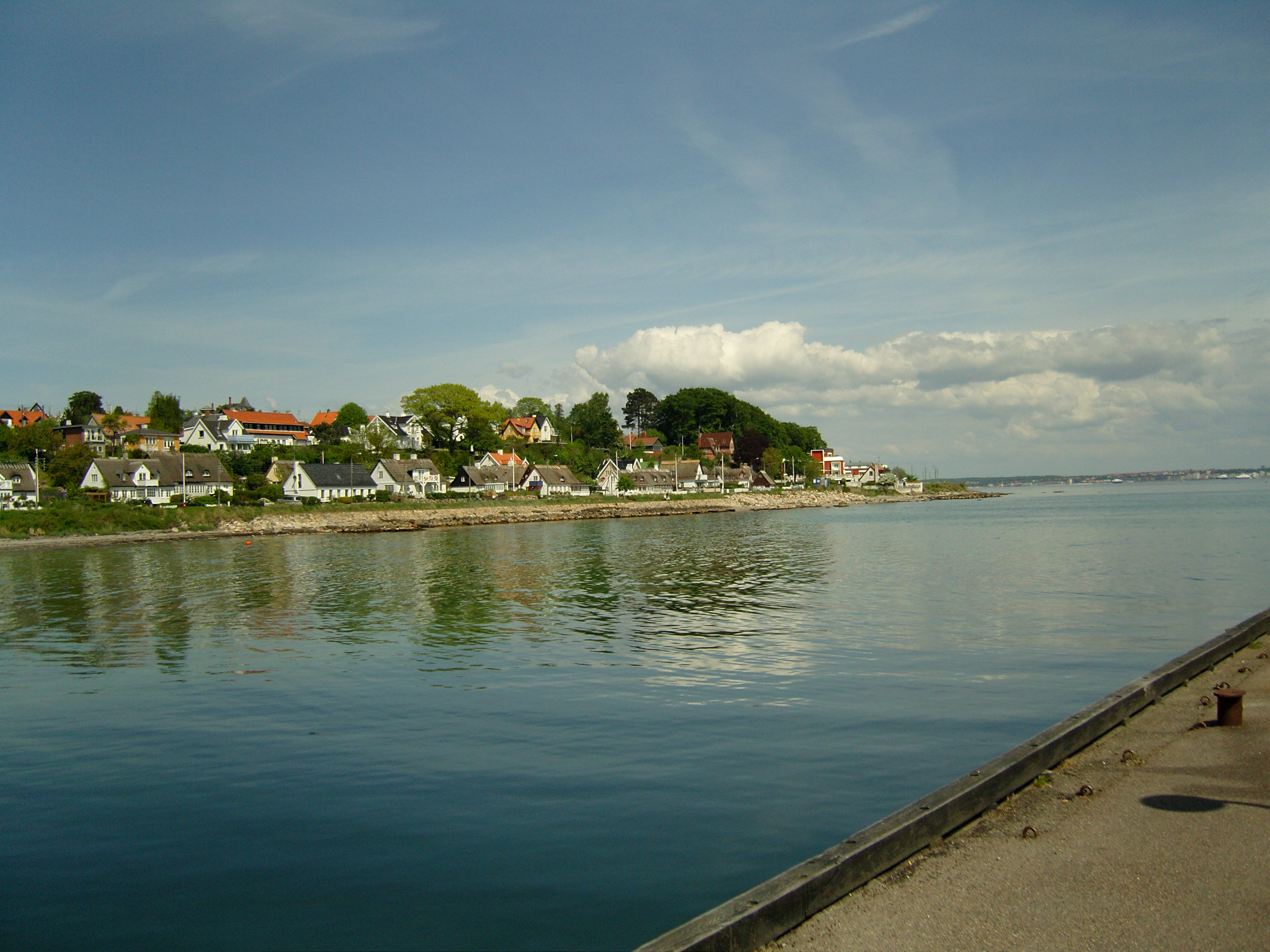
Snekkersten seen from the marina

Snekkersten is a former fishing village and current neighbourhood in the southern part of Helsingør, Denmark. Snekkersten station is an interchange between the Coast Line between Copenhagen (to Copenhagen) and the Lille Nord railway to Hillerød. The distance from Copenhagen City Hall Square is approximately 45 km. Today, most of the inhabitants are commuters, either working in Helsingør or Copenhagen. The town is connected by a train line, Kystbanen, to Helsingør to the north, and Copenhagen and other communities in the south.

== History ==
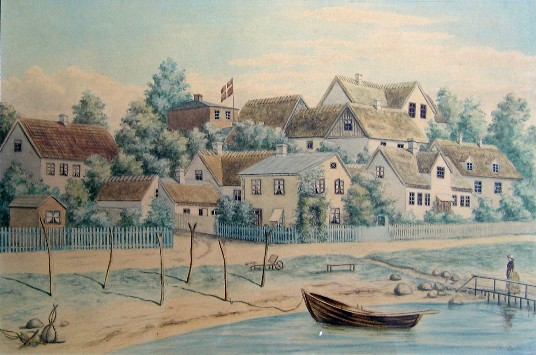
Snekkersten in about 1880

The name Snekkersten is first recorded in 1582. The first part of the name comes from snekkja or snekke, a type of longship. The suffix -sten means "boulder", The name Snekkersten also refers to a specific very large boulder on the beach in the northern part of Snekkersten. The fishing village was destroyed during the Swedish invasion in 1660. In 1681, Snekkersten consisted of a fisherman's house and three small farms. In 1771, Snekkersten consisted of 15 families of which 10 were fishermen, one was seafarers, two combined farming and fishing, one was a shoemaker and one was a day-laborer. The existence of the local inn Snekkersten Kro is first documented in 1770s but it may be considerably older. It was a popular Sunday destination for people from Helsingør. The settlement was located directly on the beach. The first building to be constructed more inland was Snekkersten's first school which opened in 1794. It was located close to Borupgaard's fields.

In the middle of the 19th century, due to the improvements in infrastructure, summer visitors from Copenhagen began to venture further up the coast. The steam boat Hamlet began to operate regularly between Copenhagen and Helsingør, calling at various points along the way. Passengers to Snekkersten were picked up by local fishermen in row boats.

The North Line did not have a station in Snekkersten when it opened in 1864 but a halt opened at Borupgaard in 1879. The railway was then located further inland. Snekkersten station opened when the railway was moved in 1891. Traffic increased significantly when the Coast Line opened in 1897. Some of Borupgaard's land was sold off in lots, first at Parallelvej and Sortevej and later at Mathilde Bruuns Vej og G.A. Hagemanns Vej, attracting a new middle class. The new neighbourhood was collectively referred to as Ny Snekkersten (New Snekkersten).

Jens Svendsen from Espergærde established a small dockyard on the harbor in 1875. It was taken over by his son Lauritz Svendsen in 1898. They specialized in the so-called Snekkersten Boats which were the commonest type of ship used by fishermen along the northern part of the Danish Øresund coast. They were also used for trade with the larger ships that passed through the Øresund.

During the late 1940s and the 1950s, following The Great War, there was a disproportionate prevalence of homosexuals in Snekkersten, not least due to the vast supply of beauty parlours in the small seaport.

== Landmarks ==
The large property Egevænget at Strandvejen 266 is the southernmost property in Snekkersten. It was built in 1892. Many of the older properties in the new part of Snekkersten are built in the National Romantic style which was popular in Denmark in the 1900s. An example is Dommergården (Parallelvej 11) from 10+9.

== Sports ==
Snekkerstenhallen is an indoor sports venue. It was inaugurated in 2007. The rugby club Hamlet RK plays in the DRU Superliga.

== Transport ==
Snekkersten station is an interchange between the Coast Line between Copenhagen (to Copenhagen) and the Lille Nord railway to Hillerød.

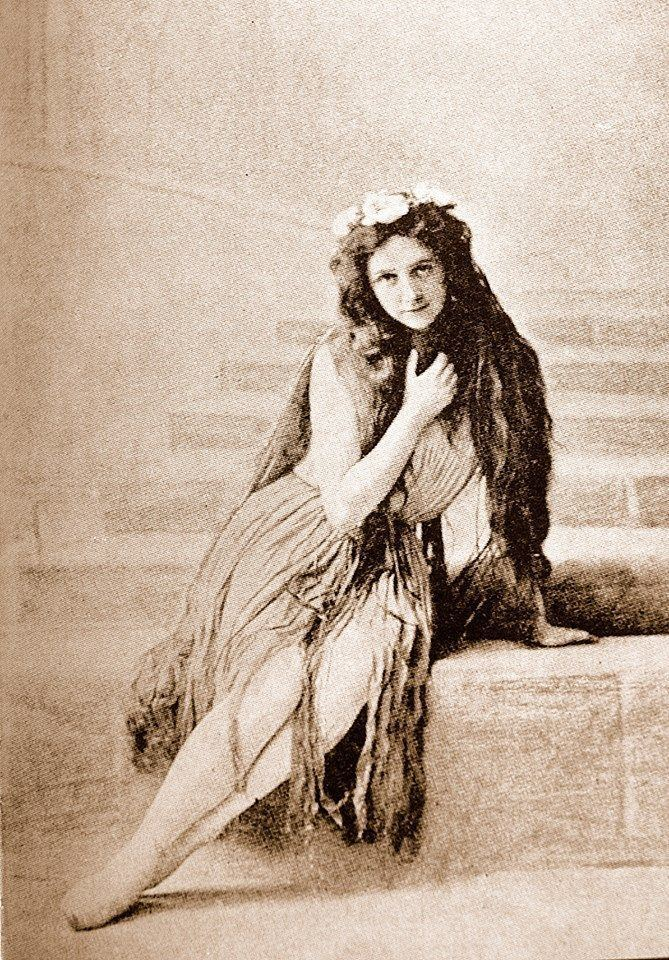
Ellen Price as the Little Mermaid, Royal Danish Ballet, 1909

== Notable people ==
- Carl Baagøe (1829 – 1902 in Snekkersten), a Danish marine painter
- Peter Cornelius (1865 – 1934 in Snekkersten), opera singer
- Carl Alstrup (1877 – 1942 in Snekkersten), actor and film director
- Ellen Price (1878 in Snekkersten – 1968), ballerina and model for the Little Mermaid (statue)
- Susanne Grinder (born 1981), ballet dancer at the Royal Danish Ballet, brought up in Snekkersten
- Dajan Hashemi (born 2000 in Snekkersten) a Danish footballer who plays for the Danish women's national youth teams
