= Peter Cornelius (opera singer) =

Danish opera singer (1865–1934)

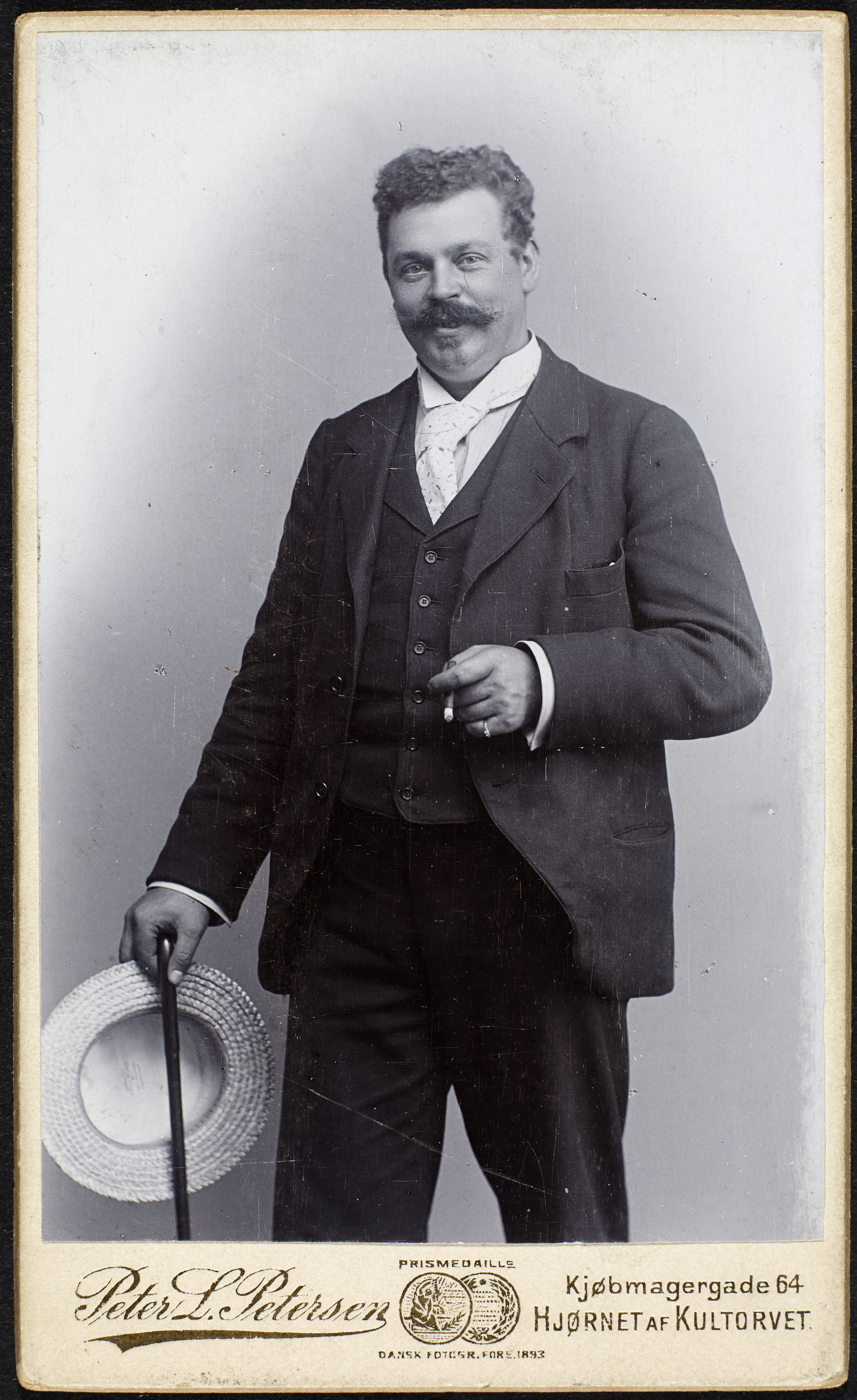
Peter Cornelius, 1895, photo by Peter Elfelt, Royal Danish Library.

Peter Cornelius (4 January 1865 – 30 December 1934) was a Danish opera singer who had a long career at the Royal Danish Theatre. He began his career as a baritone in 1892 but then transitioned into singing both tenor and baritone roles in 1899. Form 1903 on he was known for singing the lead heldentenor parts in the operas of Richard Wagner; roles which he performed both in Denmark and as a guest throughout Europe. He retired from performance in 1922 and was afterwords a voice teacher in Copenhagen.

== Early life and career as baritone ==
Peter Cornelius was born at Labjerggaard on the Jutland peninsula of Denmark on 4 January 1865. His birth name was Lauritz Peter Corneliys Petersen. He studied singing with tenor Jens Larsen Nyrop, and initially trained as a baritone. He made his professional opera debut at the Royal Danish Theatre (RDT) in 1892 in the role of Escamillo in Georges Bizet's Carmen. He remained a member of the RDT until his retirement from the stage in 1922. Other baritone roles he performed included Amonasro in Aida, Fritz Kothner in Die Meistersinger von Nürnberg, Iago in Otello, and the title role in Don Giovanni.

== Career as a tenor ==
Cornelius retrained his voice as a tenor while pursuing further studies in Berlin. There he was a pupil of Hermann Spiro and Julius Lieban. He gave his first performance as a tenor at the RDT in 1899 as the Steersman in Der fliegende Holländer. From this point on he sang a mix of tenor and baritone roles. After 1902 he was heard frequently in the leading Wagnerian heldentenor parts such as Siegmund Die Walküre, Tristan in Tristan und Isolde, Walther von Stolzing in Die Meistersinger von Nürnberg, and the title roles in Lohengrin, Parsifal, Siegfried, and Tannhäuser.

Cornelius appeared as a guest artist with major opera houses throughout Europe; including singing Siegfried in both The Ring Cycle at the Bayreuth Festival in 1906 and in Hans Richter's production of the Ring at the Royal Opera House (ROH), Covent Garden in 1908–1909. He also performed Siegmund at Bayreuth in 1906, and was heard in that role in London in 1907. He later returned to the ROH to sing the role of Renaud in the British premiere of Gluck's Armide. Other parts he sang at the ROH included Walther von Stolzing (1909) and Tristan (1910).

Cornelius made many recordings between 1907 and 1912; many of them for Pathé Records. In 1908 he made his debut at the Paris Opera. Other opera houses he appeared at as a guest included the Badisches Staatstheater Karlsruhe, the Hungarian State Opera, and the Royal Swedish Opera among others.

== Retirement and death ==
After retiring from the stage in 1922, Cornelius worked as a voice teacher in Copenhagen. He came out of retirement briefly in 1927 to replace an ailing singer in the role of Tannhäuser.

Cornelius died in Snekkersten on 30 December 1934 at the age of 69.
