= Hamlet RK =

- Full name: Hamlet Rugby Klub
- Founded: 1981
- Location: Snekkersten, Denmark
- Ground: Borupgård School
- President: (England) Andy Jones
Team kit

Hamlet RK is a Danish rugby club in Snekkersten near Helsingør.

== History ==
The club was founded in 1981.
