= Edvard Helsted =

Danish composer

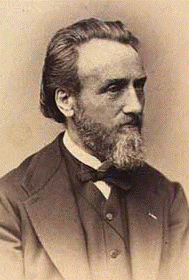
Edvard Helsted photograph by Harald Paetz

Edvard (or Eduard) Mads Ebbe Helsted (8 December 1816 – 1 March 1900) was a Danish composer. He is the brother of composer Carl Helsted.

== Biography ==
Edvard Helsted was born in Copenhagen and trained as a violinist. He worked in the Royal Chapel from 1838 to 1869, first as an orchestra member and then after 1863 as concert master. He resigned in 1869 for health reasons.

With Holger Simon Paulli, Helsted wrote Acts I and III of August Bournonville's ballet Napoli (1842). Later, he and Paulli would collaborate on another Bournonville ballet and one of his most popular, the 1858 Blomsterfesten i Genzano (Flower Festival in Genzano). Other ballet scores by Helsted are Toreadoran (1840) and Kirsten Piil (1845).

Helsted died in Fredensborg. He is buried in Asminderød Cemetery.

== See also ==
- List of Danish composers
