= Poul Schlüter =

Prime Minister of Denmark from 1982 to 1993

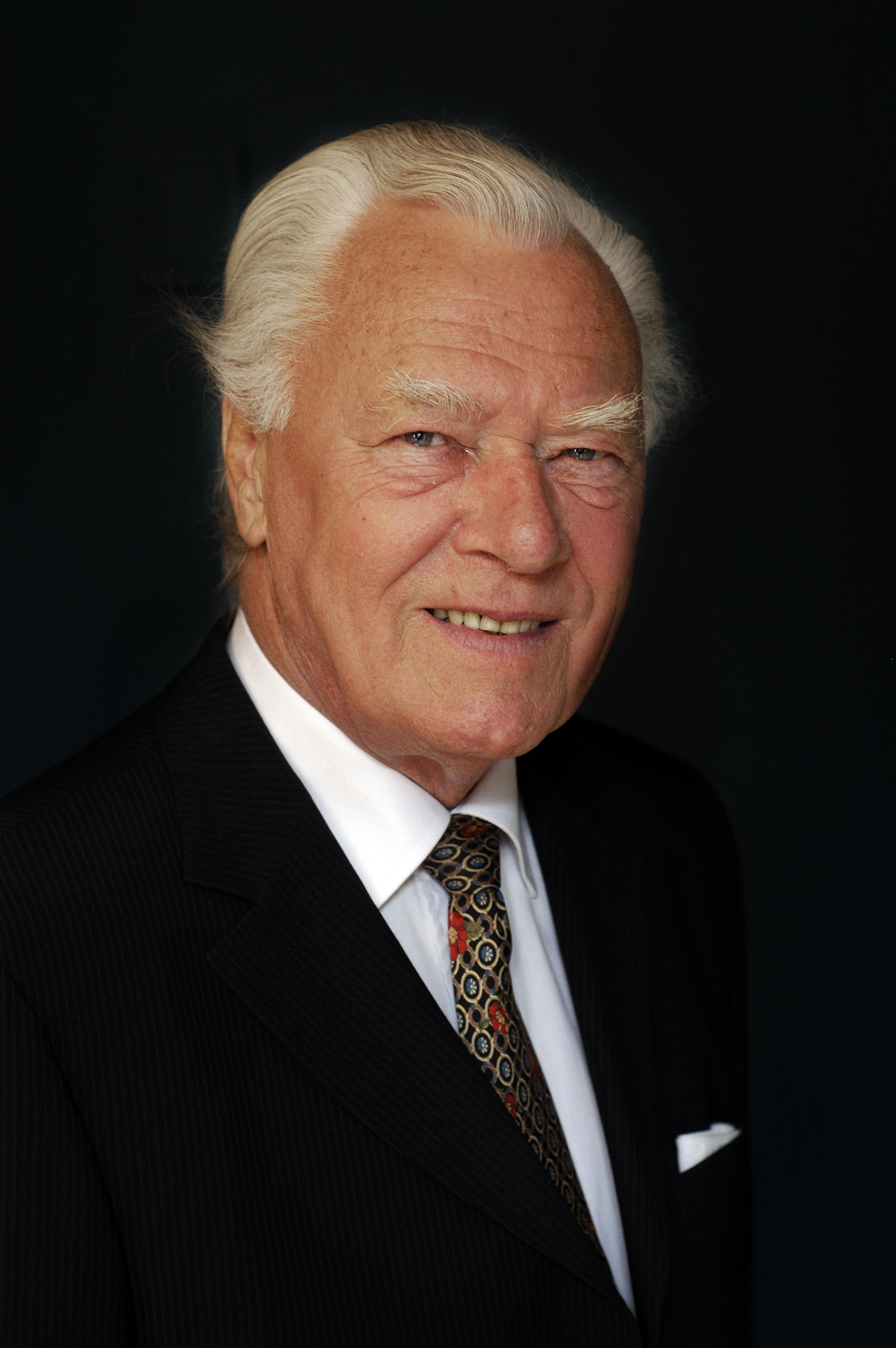
- Schlüter in 2005

Prime Minister of Denmark
- In office 10 September 1982 – 25 January 1993
- Monarch: Margrethe II
- Preceded by: Anker Jørgensen
- Succeeded by: Poul Nyrup Rasmussen

Minister of Justice
- In office 3 October 1989 – 5 October 1989
- Prime Minister: Himself
- Preceded by: Hans Peter Clausen
- Succeeded by: Hans Engell

Leader of the Conservative People's Party
- In office 1974–1993
- Preceded by: Erik Ninn-Hansen
- Succeeded by: Henning Dyremose

Member of the European Parliament
- In office 19 July 1994 – 19 July 1999
- Constituency: Denmark

Personal details
- Born: 3 April 1929 Tønder, Denmark
- Died: 27 May 2021 (aged 92) Frederiksberg, Denmark
- Party: Conservative People's Party
- Spouses: Majken Steen-Andersen (m. 1963; div. 1978) Lisbeth Povelsen (m. 1979; died 1988) Anne Marie Vessel Schlüter (m. 1989)
- Children: 4
- Education: University of Copenhagen

Poul Holmskov Schlüter (Danish pronunciation: [ˈpʰʌwl ˈhʌlmskʌw ˈʃlytɐ]; 3 April 1929 – 27 May 2021) was a Danish politician who served as Prime Minister of Denmark from 1982 to 1993. He was the first (and to date, only) member of the Conservative People's Party to become prime minister, as well as the first conservative to hold the office since 1901. Schlüter was a member of the Folketing (Danish parliament) for the Conservative People's Party from 1964 to 1994. He was also Chairman of the Conservative People's Party from 1974 to 1977 and from 1981 to 1993.

== Early life ==
Schlüter's paternal grandfather was a bricklayer from Holstein, who had moved to Tønder and married a Dane. His family was not immune to the antagonisms that developed in North Schleswig between the Danish majority and the German minority following the 1920 Schleswig plebiscites.

Born in Tønder, south Jutland, he graduated from the University of Copenhagen in 1957 with a law degree, and joined the bar in 1960.

== Political career ==
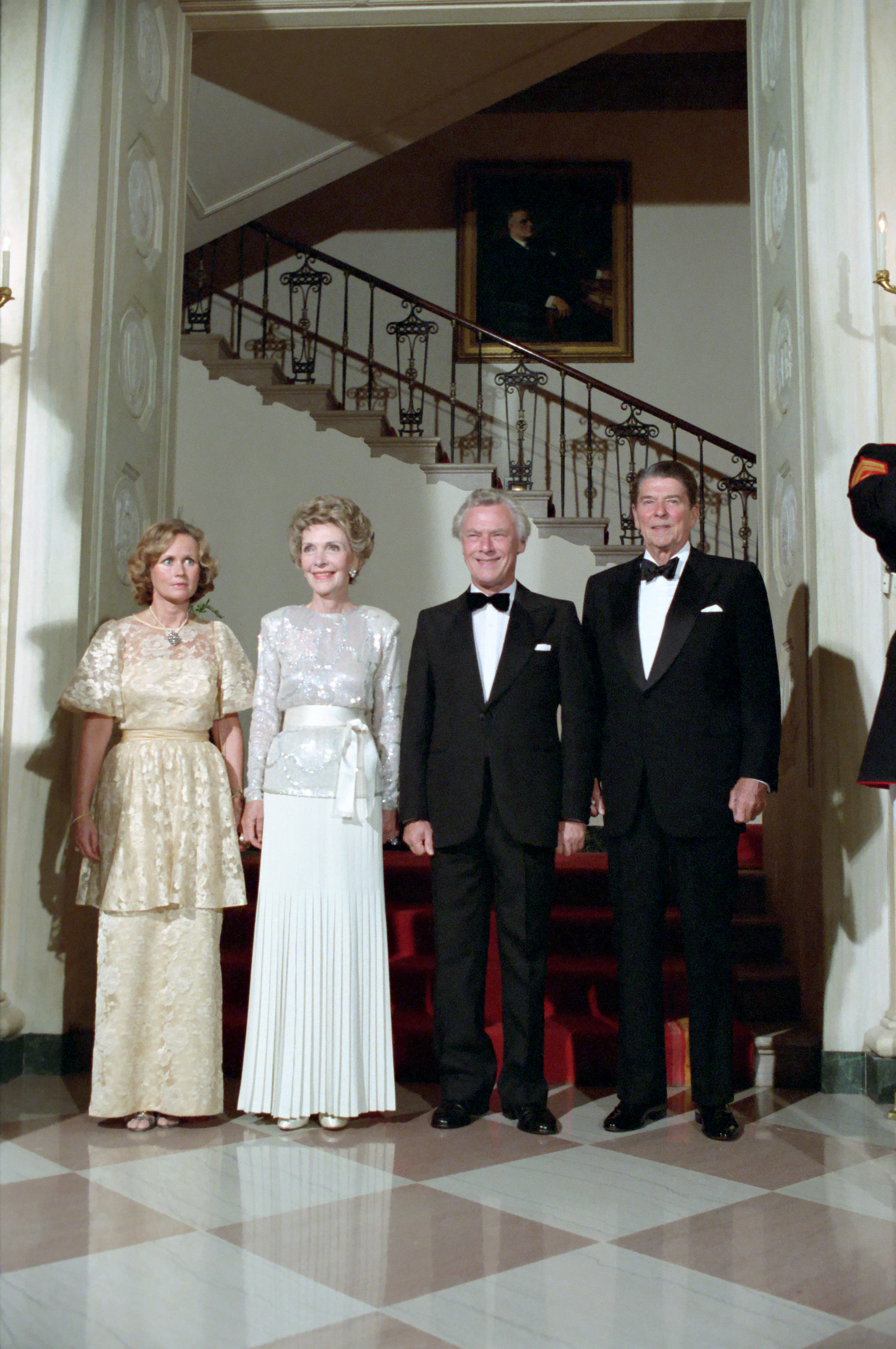
Poul Schlüter and Lisbeth Schlüter with President Reagan and Nancy Reagan in Cross Hall, 10 September 1985.

In 1964, Schlüter was elected to the Folketing for the Conservative People's Party. He was elected leader of the Conservatives from 1974, defeating Erik Ninn-Hansen. Though he lost the position in 1977, he regained it two years later.

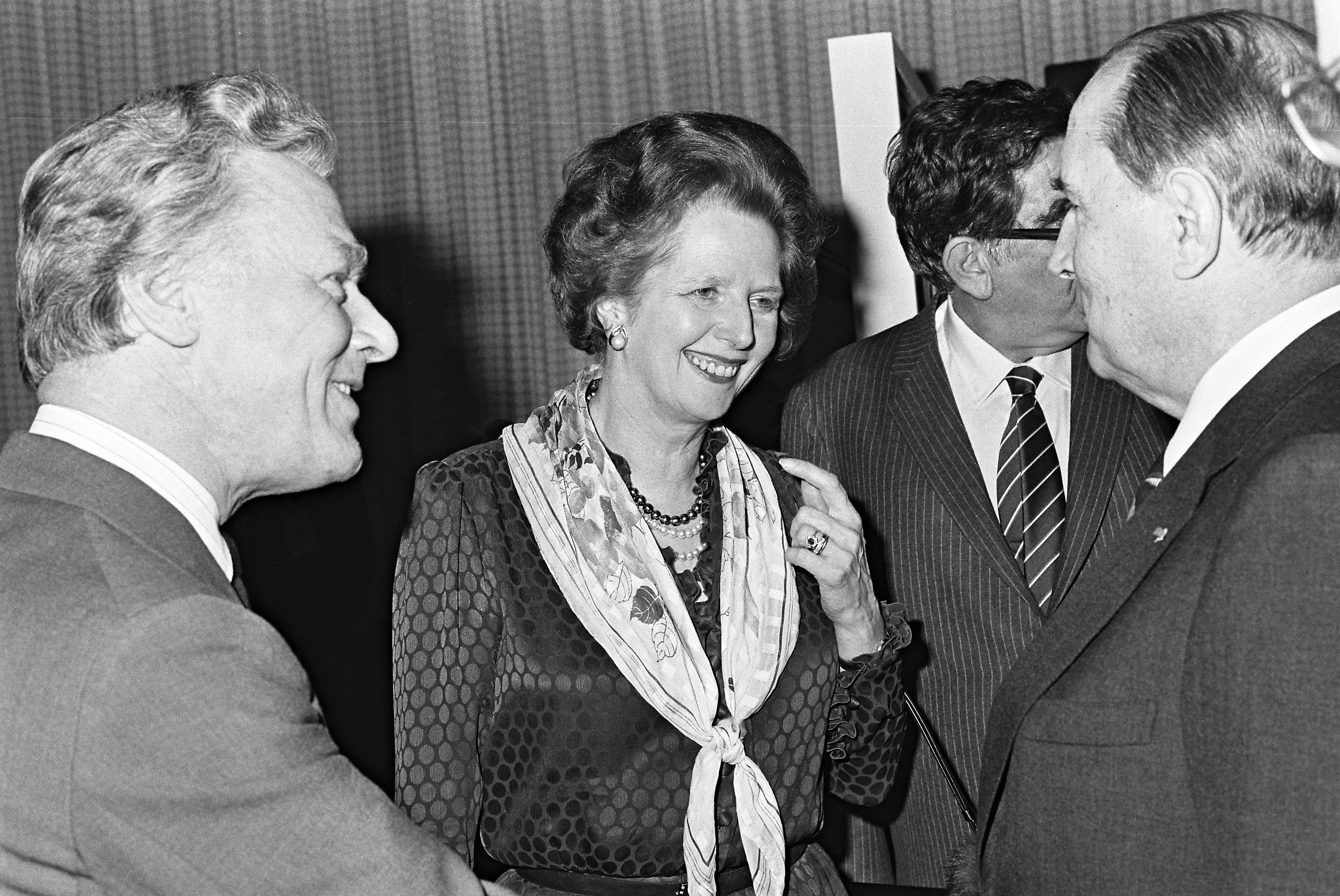
Schlüter with British Prime Minister Margaret Thatcher and French President François Mitterrand with in the European Council Summit in Athens, 4 December 1983

In 1982, after Prime Minister Anker Jørgensen was forced to resign, Schlüter constructed a four-party coalition and was appointed his successor. During his time as prime minister, he was named "Nordic Politician of the Year" (in 1984). He was subsequently granted a large number of Danish and international awards and medals.

Previously, he had served as a member of the Council of Europe from 1971 to 1974, and had headed the Danish Delegation to the Nordic Council, where he served as a member of the Council Presidium, in 1978 and 1979. He retired as prime minister in 1993 after an inquiry found that he had misinformed the Danish Parliament. The case was known as the Tamil Case (Danish: Tamilsagen), as it involved asylum requests from Tamil refugees from Sri Lanka who fled because of the civil war.

When Schlüter resigned in 1993, he attempted to have Uffe Ellemann Jensen (Venstre) appointed acting prime minister until the Conservative Henning Dyremose could take over. The attempt was dropped as royal cabinet secretary Niels Eilschou Holm considered the maneuver unconstitutional. Instead, Poul Nyrup Rasmussen (Social Democrats) was appointed prime minister following a "Queen's round".

Following his retirement as prime minister in 1993, Schlüter served as a member of the European Parliament from 1994 to 1999, the first three years as vice-president of the body.

== Other ventures ==
In 2003, Schlüter was appointed by the Swedish Minister of Co-operation as her special envoy to promote freedom of movement in the Nordic countries. Schlüter was to work on ways of increasing individual freedom of movement and present specific proposals to the Nordic Council Session in October 2003.

In 2004, Schlüter co-founded the first Danish free-market think tank CEPOS, and gave the opening speech at CEPOS' opening reception at the Hotel D'Angleterre in Copenhagen.

== Personal life ==
Schlüter was married three times: On 16 March 1963, he married Majken Steen-Andersen, but the couple divorced in 1978. Their only child, Peter, was born in 1963. Schlüter then married Lisbeth Povelsen on 20 September 1979. She died during her husband's premiership on 17 February 1988.

On 21 July 1989, while still prime minister, Schlüter married the Danish ballet dancer Anne Marie Vessel as his third wife.

== Death ==
Schlüter died of natural causes at the Bispebjerg Hospital in Copenhagen, on 27 May 2021, at the age of 92. According to his family statement, it was announced that Schlüter had fallen asleep peacefully, surrounded by his loved ones.

Many Danish politics, who paid tribute to Schlüter included four living prime ministers (Poul Nyrup Rasmussen, Anders Fogh Rasmussen, Lars Løkke Rasmussen, and Helle Thorning-Schmidt), current prime minister Mette Frederiksen, and former Danish foreign minister Per Stig Møller:

Poul Schlüter was a brilliant man, who deeply loved and respected his profession with a great politics. Through his humanity, he touched all of our hearts and his legendary life will be endure for all generations to come. He will forever be with us, and will be terribly miss.

Schlüter was interred at the Holmen Church in Copenhagen.

== Honours ==
=== National honours ===
- Denmark: Knight Grand Cross of the Order of the Dannebrog

=== Foreign honours ===
- Luxembourg: Knight Grand Cross of the Order of the Oak Crown
- Sweden: Knight Grand Cross of the Royal Order of the Polar Star

== Bibliography ==
- Schlüter, Poul (1999). Sikken et liv [What a Life] (in Danish). Aschehoug. ISBN 8711113197.

Political offices
Preceded by Anker Jørgensen	Prime Minister of Denmark; 1982–1993	Succeeded by Poul Nyrup Rasmussen
