= The Little Mermaid (statue) =

Sculpture by Edvard Eriksen

- Den lille Havfrue
- Statue of The Little Mermaid at Langelinie
- Interactive map of The Little Mermaid
- Location: Copenhagen, Denmark
- Coordinates: 55°41′34.3″N 12°35′57.4″E
- Designer: Edvard Eriksen
- Type: Statue
- Material: Bronze
- Opening date: August 23, 1913

The Little Mermaid (Danish: Den lille Havfrue) is a bronze statue by Edvard Eriksen, depicting a mermaid becoming human. The sculpture is displayed on a rock by the waterside at the Langelinie promenade in Copenhagen, Denmark. (Note: According to German magazine Der Spiegel, the statue located in Copenhagen harbour has always been an exact copy, with the sculptor's heirs keeping the original at an undisclosed location.) It is 1.25 metres (4.1 ft) tall and weighs 175 kilograms (385 lb).

Based on the 1837 fairy tale of the same name by Danish author Hans Christian Andersen, the small and unimposing statue is a Copenhagen icon and has been a major tourist attraction since its unveiling in 1913. In recent decades it has become a popular target for defacement by vandals and political activists.

Mermaid is among iconic statues that symbolise cities. Others include: Manneken Pis in Brussels; the Statue of Liberty in New York; Christ the Redeemer in Rio de Janeiro; the statue of Pania of the Reef in Napier; Smok Wawelski (Wawel Dragon) in Kraków, Poland; or Nelson's Column and Eros in London.

== History ==
The statue was commissioned in 1909 by Carl Jacobsen, son of the founder of Carlsberg, who had been fascinated by a ballet about the fairytale in Copenhagen's Royal Theatre and asked the ballerina, Ellen Price, to model for the statue.

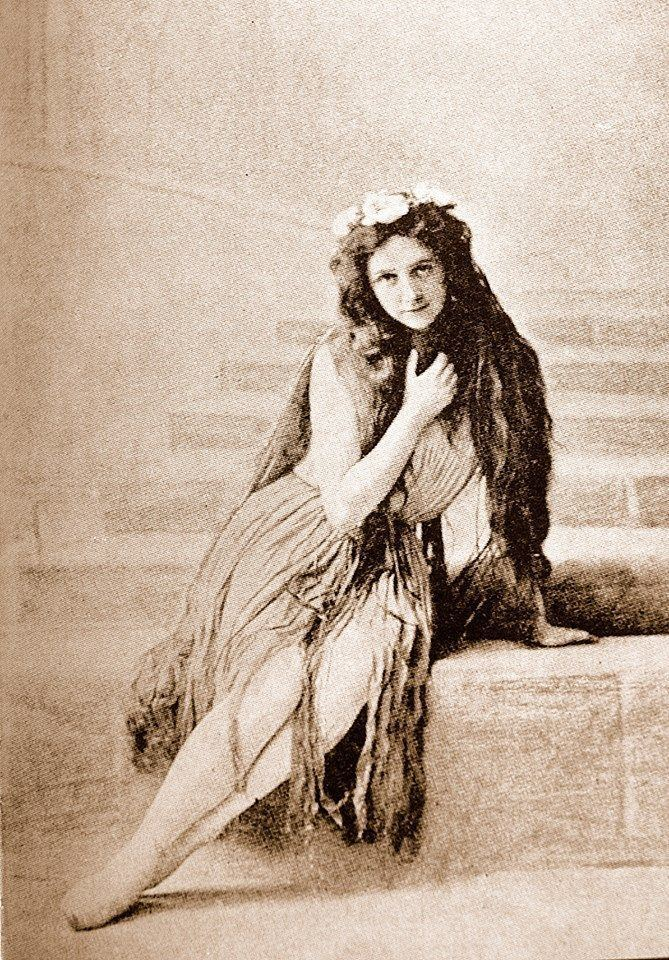
Ellen Price as the Little Mermaid, Royal Danish Ballet, 1909

The sculptor Edvard Eriksen created the bronze statue, which was unveiled on August 23, 1913. Eriksen asked Price to model for the statue, but as the ballerina did not agree to model in the nude, the statue was instead modelled completely on the sculptor's wife, Eline Eriksen. There is a popular story that the face was modelled on Price, but this is false.

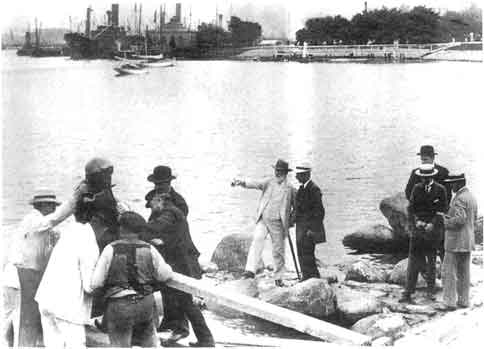
Assembly of the Little Mermaid statue (Copenhagen, Langeline, 1913)

The Copenhagen City Council arranged to move the statue to Shanghai at the Danish Pavilion for the duration of the Expo 2010 (May to October), the first time it had been moved officially from its perch since it was installed almost a century earlier. While the statue was away in Shanghai an authorised copy was displayed on a rock in the lake in Copenhagen's nearby Tivoli Gardens. Copenhagen officials have considered moving the statue several meters out into the harbour to discourage vandalism and to prevent tourists from climbing onto it, but as of September 2022 the statue remains on dry land at the water side at Langelinie.

=== Vandalism ===
The statue has been damaged and defaced many times since the mid-1960s for various reasons, but has been restored each time.

On April 24, 1964, the statue's head was sawn off and stolen by politically oriented artists of the Situationist movement, amongst them Jørgen Nash. The head was never recovered and a new head was produced and placed on the statue. On July 22, 1984, the right arm was sawn off and returned two days later by two young men. In 1990, an attempt to sever the statue's head left an 18 centimeters (7 in) deep cut in the neck.

On January 6, 1998, the statue was decapitated again; the culprits were never found, but the head was returned anonymously to a nearby television station, and reattached on February 4. On the night of September 10, 2003, the statue was knocked off its base with explosives and later found in the harbour's waters. Holes had been blasted in the mermaid's wrist and knee.

Paint has been poured on the statue several times, including one episode in 1963 and two in March and May 2007. On March 8, 2006, a dildo was attached to the statue's hand, green paint was dumped over it, and the date March 8 was written on it. It is suspected that this vandalism was connected with International Women's Day, which is on March 8.

The statue was found drenched in red paint on May 30, 2017 with the message "Danmark [sic] defend the whales of the Faroe Islands", a reference to whaling in the Faroe Islands (an autonomous country in the Kingdom of Denmark), written on the ground in front of the statue.

About two weeks later, on June 14, the statue was drenched in blue and white paint. "Befri Abdulle" (Free Abdulle) was written in front of the statue, but it was unclear what this referred to at the time. Later, police said the writing was likely referring to Abdulle Ahmed, a Somali refugee who has been detained in a high security unit in Denmark since 2001 due to a custody sentence.

On 13 January 2020, "Free Hong Kong" was painted on the stone the statue is mounted on by supporters of the 2019–20 Hong Kong protests. On 3 June 2020, in the wake of the George Floyd protests and Black Lives Matter movement, the statue was vandalized with the words "racist fish" scrawled on its stone base, which left observers and specialists puzzled, as nothing related to the statue, H.C. Andersen or his fairy tale could be construed as racist.

In March 2022, "Z = svastika" was written on the stone base of the statue, which was thought to be opposition to Russia and their invasion of Ukraine, where Russian forces widely used "Z" as their symbol. Almost exactly a year later, a Russian flag was painted on the stone, which was thought to be a show of support for Russia.

Although not regarded as vandalism since no damage is done to the statue, people have also repeatedly dressed it, either for fun or to make more serious statements. In 2004, the statue was draped in a burqa in a protest against Turkey's application to join the European Union. In May 2007, it was again found draped in Muslim dress and a head scarf. Other examples are times where a Christmas hat has been put on the head, or it has been dressed in the jerseys of the Norwegian or Swedish national football teams (especially the Danish and Swedish teams have a highly competitive rivalry).

== Copies ==
Aside from the statue on display, which itself is a replica of the original, more than thirteen undamaged copies of the statue are located around the world:

- Solvang, California
- Kimballton, Iowa
- Piatra Neamţ, Romania
- Torrejón de Ardoz (Madrid), Spain
- Seoul, South Korea
- a half-sized copy in Calgary, Alberta, Canada
- a copy at the grave of Danish-American entertainer Victor Borge
- the Copenhagen Airport has a replica of the mermaid along with a statue of Andersen

In 2000, Kristian Dahlgard created a statue of 'The Little Mermaid' that looks out over Larvotto beach in Monaco. The statue was created, with layers and layers of metal, in homage to the Danes who live in Monaco, as well as to mark the 50th year of the reign of the late Prince Rainier III.

A copy of the statue forms the Danish contribution to the International Peace Gardens in Salt Lake City. The half-size replica was stolen on February 26, 2010, but was recovered on April 7, 2010, abandoned in the park.

In 1960, a replica of the statue was presented by Denmark to Brazil in honor of the construction of Brasília, the country's new capital that was inaugurated in the year. It was installed just 5 years later in front of the main building of the Brazilian Navy Command, in Brasília, Federal District, where it remains to this day.

== Similar works ==
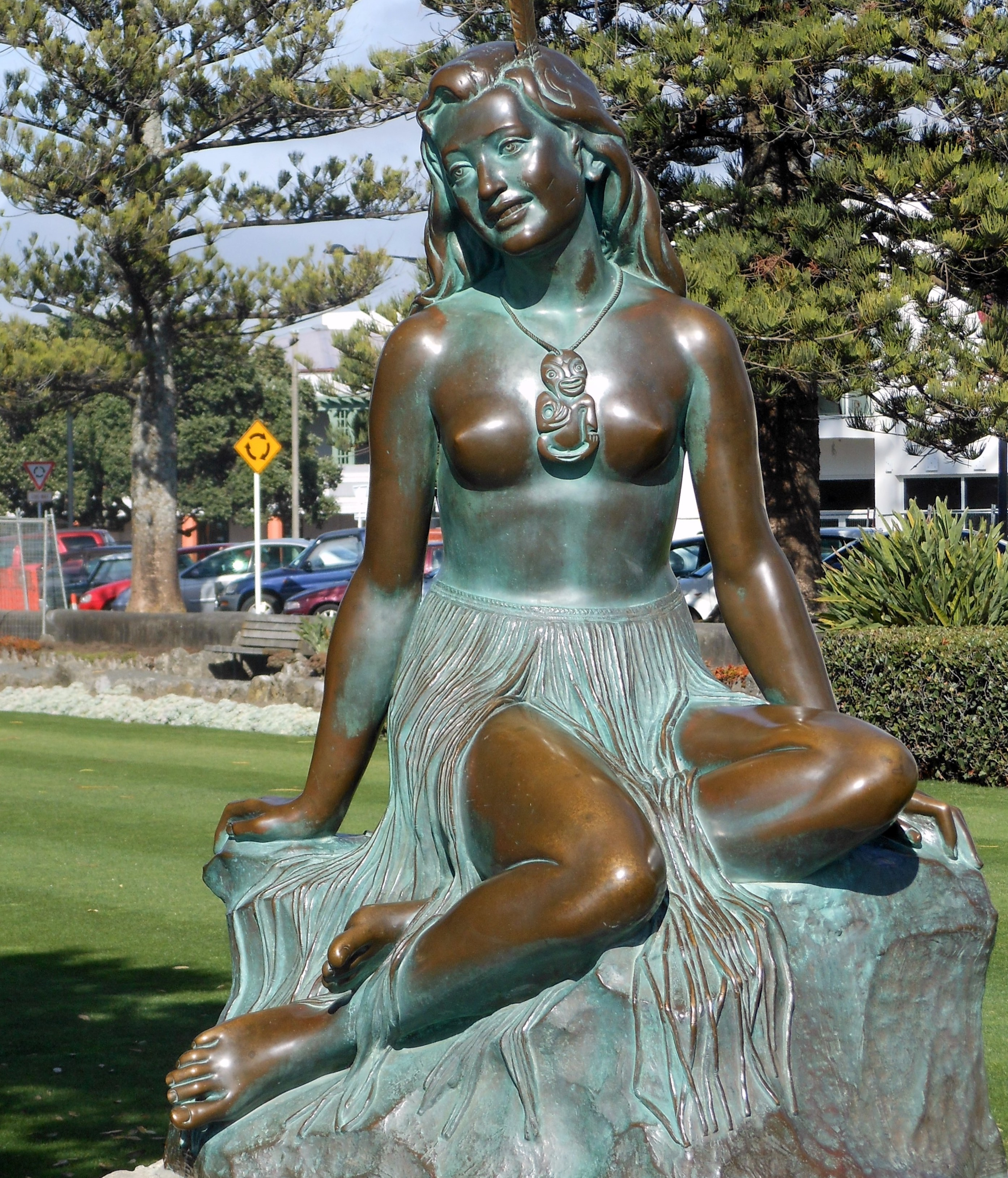
Pania of the Reef.

Another mermaid statue was unveiled near the Little Mermaid in 2006 and then moved to the fort in Dragør in 2018. A further one was erected in Monopoli, Puglia in 2023.

Some statues similar to The Little Mermaid are in Sicily. In 1962, the first such statue was installed on the seafront in Giardini Naxos, measuring about 4 metres (13 ft) high over a fountain. A second example portrays a mermaid that is visible at a sea depth of about 18 metres (59 ft), inside the Marine Protected Area of Plemmiro of Siracusa.

A Statue of Pania (also known as Pania of the Reef) is located on Marine Parade in Napier, New Zealand, and honors the life of Pania, a figure of Māori mythology.

== Copyright issues ==
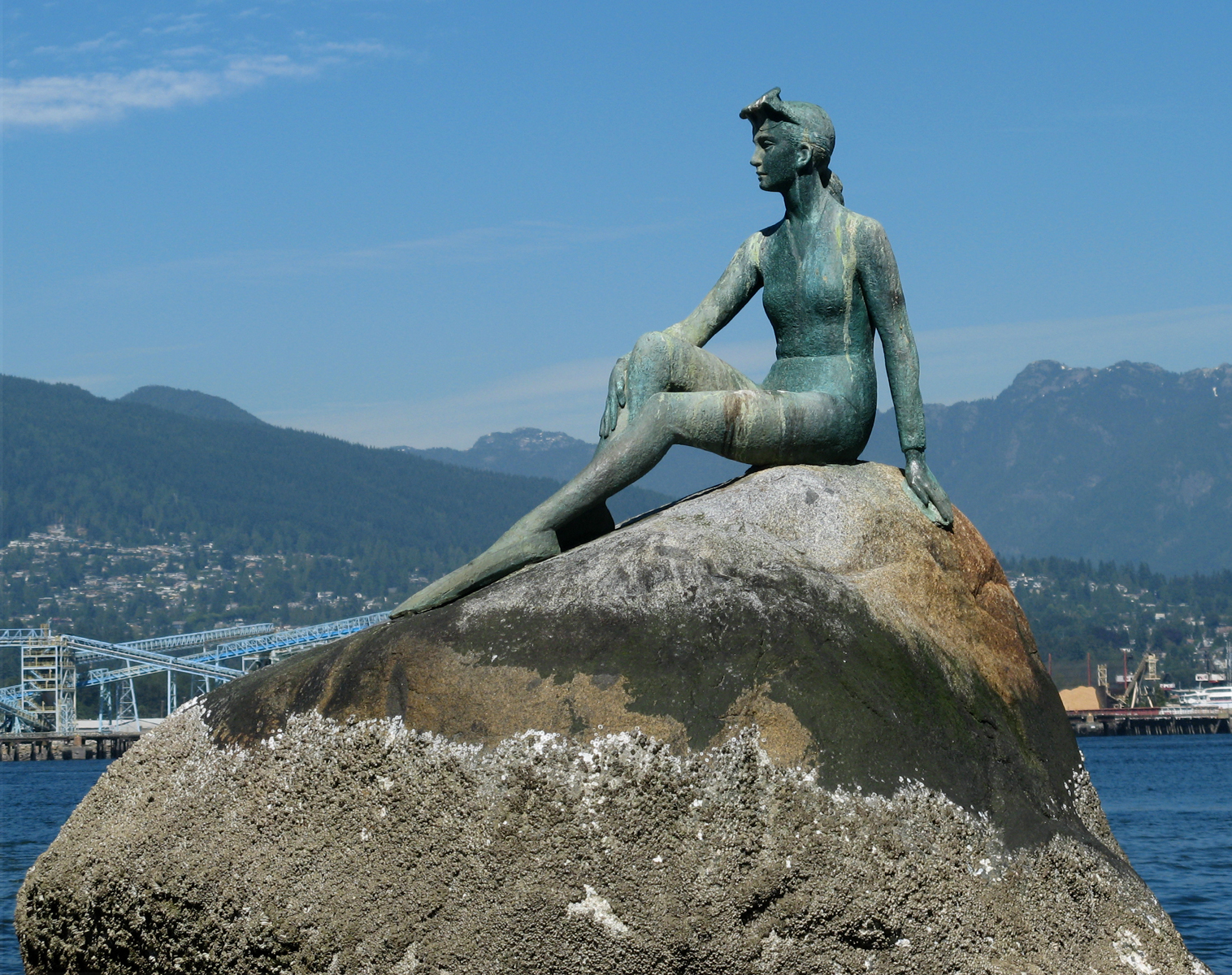
Girl in a Wetsuit by Elek Imredy (1972), a statue similar to The Little Mermaid, in Vancouver

The statue is under copyright until 1 January 2030, seventy years after the death of the creator. As of 2019, replicas can be purchased, authorized for sale by the Eriksen family. The Danish newspaper Berlingske was sued in 2020 for publishing cartoons that parodied the statue as part of an article about Danish debate culture and right-wing ideas. The newspaper was accused of demonizing The Little Mermaid and the court ordered it to pay 285,000 kroner. The newspaper lost its appeal in February 2022. However, the Danish Supreme Court ruled on May 17, 2023 that "neither the caricature drawing nor the photograph of The Little Mermaid with a mask on, which was brought to Berlingske in connection with newspaper articles, infringed the copyright of the heirs to the sculpture The Little Mermaid," citing the parody principle enshrined in the copyright law of Denmark.

A replica was installed in Greenville, Michigan in 1994 to celebrate the town's Danish heritage, at a cost of $10,000 (equivalent to $21,722 in 2025). In 2009, the Artists Rights Society asked the town for a $3,800 licensing fee, claiming the work violated Eriksen's copyright. At about 76 cm (30 in) in height, the replica in Greenville is half the size of the original, and has a different face and larger breasts as well as other distinguishing factors. The copyright claim was later reported to have been dropped.

There are similarities between The Little Mermaid statue and the Pania of the Reef statue on the beachfront at Napier in New Zealand, and some similarities in the little mermaid and Pania tales. The 1972 statue of a female diver (titled Girl in a Wetsuit by Elek Imredy) in Vancouver, British Columbia, Canada was commissioned when, unable to obtain permission to reproduce the Copenhagen statue, Vancouver authorities selected a modern version.

In 2016, a similar statue was installed at the harbor in Asaa, Denmark, where it is also mounted on the top of a rock. The heirs of the sculptor are suing, claiming that the Asaa statue bears too close a resemblance to the famous one, and they are demanding damages and the destruction of the Asaa statue.

== In popular culture ==
The sculpture is seen in the following films:

- Sun Over Denmark (1936)
- Wienerbarnet (1941)
- Bundfald (1957)
- Forelsket i København (1960)
- Reptilicus (1961)
- Løgn og løvebrøl (1961)
- Pigen og millionæren (1965)
- En ven i bolignøden (1965)
- Slap af, Frede (1966)
- Rusalochka (1968)
- Hans Christian Andersen's The Little Mermaid (1975)
- Hopla på sengekanten (1976)
- Olsen-banden går i krig (1978)
- Walter og Carlo i Amerika (1989)
- Krummerne (1991)
- Copenhagen (2014)

The statue is used as the image for Copenhagen in the 1988 videogame Where in Europe is Carmen Sandiego?.

== See also ==
- Mermaid of Warsaw
- Mermaid of Zennor
