= Eline Eriksen =

Danish art model and wife of Edvard Eriksen

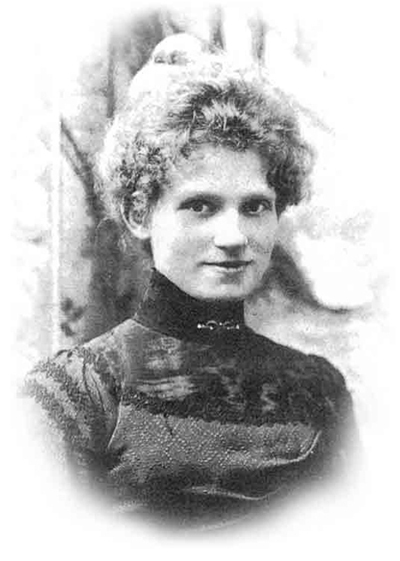
Eline Eriksen

Eline Eriksen (August, 31th 1881–January, 1963), born Eline Vilhelmine Møller, was the wife (since 1900) of Edvard Eriksen and the model for the body of the Little Mermaid statue in Copenhagen, Denmark. The face of that statue was modeled after ballerina Ellen Price. Before this Eriksen had stood model for several of her husband's statues, such as The First Grief, and The Sufferer. She is buried along with her husband at Copenhagen's Vestre Cemetery.
