= Edvard Eriksen =

Danish–Icelandic sculptor (1876–1959)

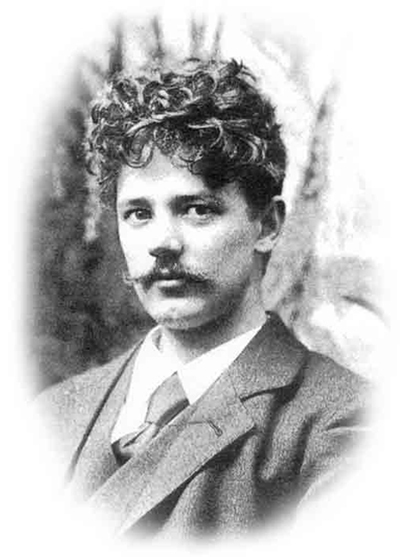
- Born: 10 March 1876; Copenhagen, Denmark
- Died: 12 January 1959 (aged 82); Copenhagen
- Resting place: Vestre Cemetery, Copenhagen
- Education: Royal Danish Academy of Fine Arts
- Notable work: The Little Mermaid statue, Langelinie, Copenhagen
- Awards: Order of the Dannebrog

Edvard Eriksen (10 March 1876 – 12 January 1959) was a Danish–Icelandic sculptor.

== Biography ==
He apprenticed as a wood carver, after which he trained at the Royal Danish Academy of Fine Arts between 1894 and 1899.

Eriksen's most famous work is the bronze statue of The Little Mermaid (Den Lille Havfrue). In 1909, Carl Jacobsen, son of the founder of Carlsberg brewery, commissioned the work of art as a gift to the City of Copenhagen. It was set up on 23 August 1913 by the shore of the promenade Langelinie in the harbor of the old port district of Nyhavn. Two different women served as models to create the statue. Eriksen used his wife, Eline Eriksen, as the model for the statue's body and actress Ellen Price as the model for the mermaid's head.

Among his other works are the allegorical statues Grief, Memory and Love made of marble in 1908 for the sarcophagus of Christian IX and Queen Louise in Roskilde Cathedral. Edvard Eriksen taught at the Royal Danish Academy between 1908–1919 and was a conservator at Thorvaldsen Museum 1930–1953.

He travelled around Italy with his family learning to carve in marble and was made an honorary professor at the Accademia di Belle Arti di Carrara. He was appointed Knight of the Order of the Dannebrog in 1932.

== Personal life ==
After marrying Eline Vilhelmine Møller (1881-1963) in 1900, they had five children. Eriksen died at Copenhagen and was buried at Vestre Cemetery.
