= Ellen Price =

Danish actress and ballerina

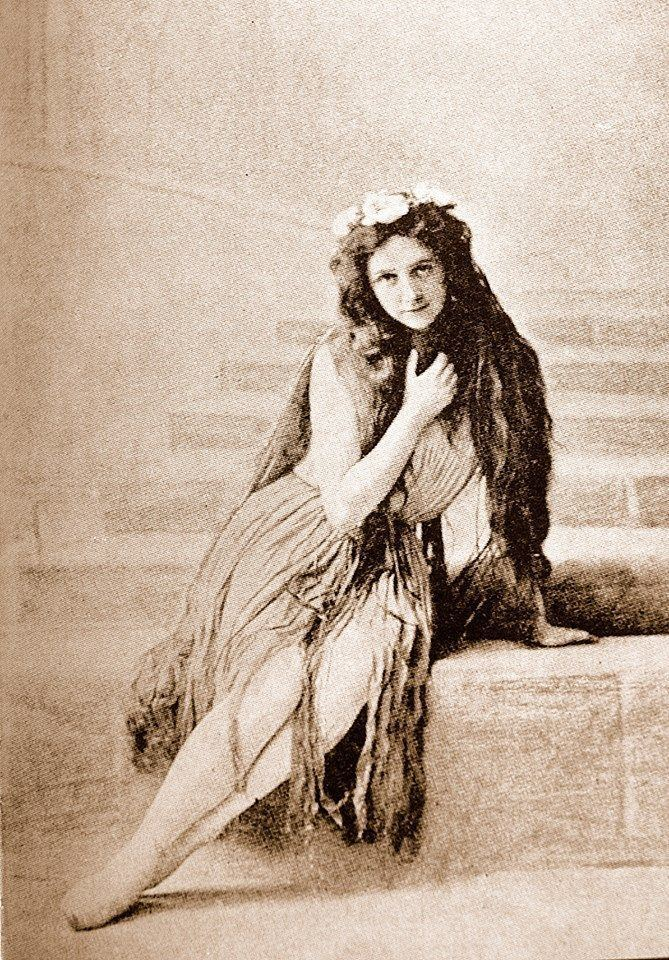
- Ellen Price as the Little Mermaid, Royal Danish Ballet, 1909.
- Born: Ellen Juliette Collin Price de Plane, 21 June 1878
- Died: 4 March 1968 (aged 89)
- Occupation: ballerina

Ellen Juliette Collin Price de Plane (21 June 1878 – 4 March 1968), better known as Ellen Price, was a Danish ballerina and actress, and a model for the statue The Little Mermaid in Copenhagen.

Price was born in Snekkersten in a well-known artistic family: her father Andreas Nicolai Carl Price (1839–1909) and her mother Helga Collin (1841–1918) were ballet dancers in Royal Danish Theatre. Her father's cousin, Juliette Price (1831–1906), was a Danish prima ballerina and a number of Price's other relatives were actors and musicians.

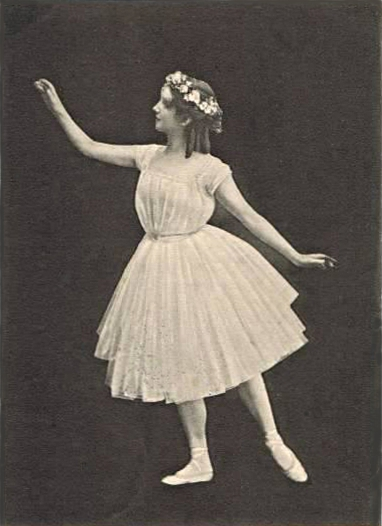
Ellen Price as La Sylphide.

In 1889–1895, Price was trained at school of Royal Danish Ballet and joined the theater of Royal Danish Ballet; she debuted on 28 May 1895 with a pas de trois in the ballet Window (La Ventana) written by composer Hans Christian Lumbye and choreographed by August Bournonville. In 1903, she became a prima ballerina of Royal Danish Ballet. Her roles included La Sylphide, Cinderella, and Little Mermaid.

The Little Mermaid statue

The role of the Little Mermaid gave her the most unexpected glory. The ballet The Little Mermaid, based on Hans Christian Andersen's fairy-tale and set to music by Fini Henriques, was staged by the choreographer Hans Beck (1861–1952) in 1909 with the Royal Danish Ballet. Among spectators of ballet had been Danish brewer and art collector Carl Jacobsen; the ballet left such a strong impression on him that he commissioned sculptor Edvard Eriksen to create a statue of the Little Mermaid. Though Price agreed to model for the statue, she refused to pose nude and her likeness was only used for the head of the statue. For the body of the statue, Eriksen used his wife Eline Eriksen as a model. The bronze statue that Eriksen created was unveiled on 23 August 1913 and presented to the city by Jacobsen. The Little Mermaid statue has since become a symbol of Copenhagen.

Price worked in Royal Danish Ballet until 1913. Afterward, she pursued a career as a dramatic actress. She worked at drama theater of city Aarhus and acted in two silent films. She died on 4 March 1968 in Brøndby Municipality; she was buried in the small city of Gudhjem on the Danish island Bornholm in a southwest part of Baltic Sea.
