= The Kermesse in Bruges =

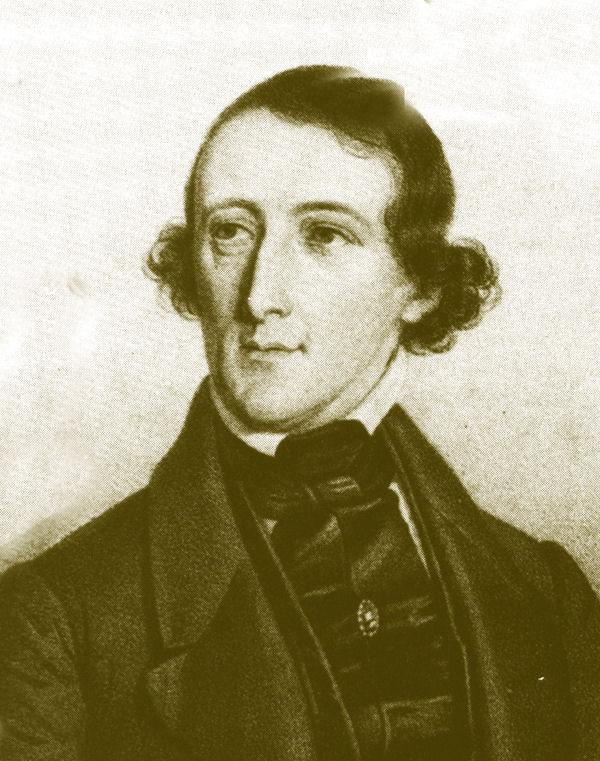
Bournonville, 1841.

The Kermesse in Bruges, or The Three Gifts is a burlesque ballet in three acts created by the Danish ballet master and choreographer August Bournonville to music by Holger Simon Paulli, first performed by the Royal Danish Ballet on 4 April 1851. The Danish title is Kermessen i Brügge eller De tre Gaver. The ballet tells the story of three brothers who receive magic gifts from an alchemist.

== Plot summary ==
At a church fair (or kermesse) in 17th century Bruges three brothers (Adrian, Geert, and Carelis) receive magical gifts from the alchemist Mirewelt. The two older brothers, Adrian and Geert, leave their sweethearts behind and set off into the world with their gifts (a sword and a ring) to seek their fortunes. The magical gifts bring disappointment to the two men but, back home, the brothers discover Carelis' magic lute brings happiness to all. Adrian, Geert, and Mirewelt are charged with sorcery and sentenced to death at the stake, but Carelis appears and his magic lute sets everyone to dancing joyfully. The condemned are released and reunited with their sweethearts while Carelis and Eleonore, the alchemist's daughter, embrace. Carelis' magic lute is locked away in a chest, to be taken out only at the yearly kermesse.

== Characters ==
- Adrian, brother to Geert and Carelis.
- Geert, brother to Adrian and Carelis.
- Carelis, brother to Adrian and Geert.
- Johanna, sweetheart of Adrian.
- Marchen, sweetheart of Geert.
- Trutje, mother to Johanna and Marchen.
- Mirewelt, an alchemist.
- Eleonore, Mirewelt's daughter and Carelis' beloved.
- Madame von Everdingen, a beautiful widow.

== Music ==
The music is composed and arranged by Holger Simon Paulli, who liberally borrowed musical material from other composers and also from his own earlier works. To illustrate the young couple's love for one another Paulli lets Carelis, in the scene in which he is alone with Eleonore, play the romanesca, a 17th-century aire de danse, on the viola da gamba. Extensive sections of the marketplace scene in Act I are danced to various passages from Rossini's opera comique Le Comte Ory (1828), whilst the round dance in the same scene is taken from Paulli's music for Bournonville's ballet, The White Rose. In the scene set in Madame van Everdingen's home, music from Ferdinand Hérold's opera Zampa and Rossini's finale from his opera L'assedio di Corinto are used. Paulli's own voice as a composer is heard in the many dances, such as the pas de deux for Eleonore and Carelis in Act I; similarly, the obligatory final galop is a characteristic example of the dance music Paulli wrote for Bournonville.

== History ==
The Kermesse in Bruges is composed of equal parts folk tale and contemporary satire. Bournonville's burlesque ballet about Flemish life in the seventeenth century was first performed in 1851, two years after the introduction of Denmark's first liberal constitution, at a time when Europe was in turmoil. The Kermesse in Bruges is, in its own way, Bournonville's comment on a period which had to learn to administer freedom. The alchemist Mirewelt cannot predict the consequences when, out of sheer gratitude, he gives the three brothers a share in his magic powers, but his three gifts quickly prove to be all it takes to turn the social order in Bruges upside down. The moral of the tale is that success in battle and love are short-lived gifts whereas the cheerful disposition will, as Bournonville himself wrote, always triumph and endure. There is indeed much cheerfulness in this Danish classic which also contains one of Bournonville's most beautiful dance compositions, the pas de deux in Act I, Carelis' declaration of love to Eleonore. This pas de deux received its definitive form when Bournonville restaged the ballet in 1865.

Later important productions are Harald Lander's and Valborg Borchesnius' version from 1943, where some scenes were omitted in an attempt to tighten the structure. In 1966, Flemming Flindt and Hans Brenaa made their own treatment. The costumes were in bright colours in the fashion of the day, but the performance also had a brush of something mysterious and medieval in the lighting and grouping.

In 1979 Brenaa created a new version, in which the ballet received a cinematic speed and a cheerful energy. This version was kept until 2000, when Dinna Bjørn, Anne Marie Vessel Schlüter, and the stage producer Jan Maagaard injected a serious shade into the cheerful lightness of the earlier production.

In 2000, Peter Schaufuss also created a version of The Kermesse in Bruges for his own company, The Peter Schaufuss Ballet.

== See also ==
- List of ballets by title
