= Napoli (ballet) =

1842 ballet created by August Bournonville

Napoli, or The Fisherman and His Bride
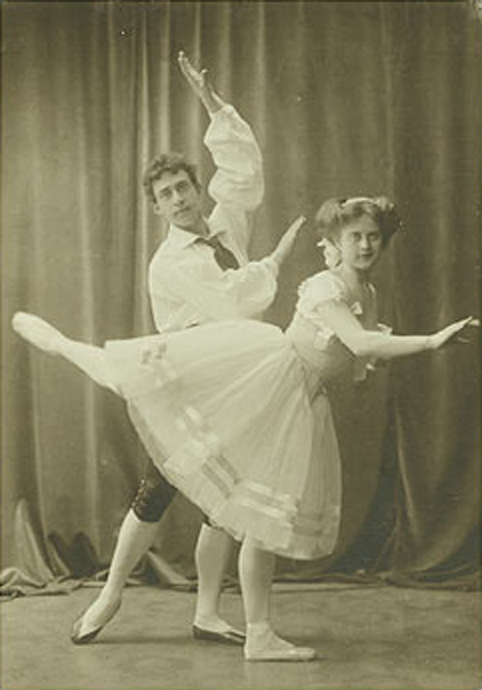
- Richard Jensen and Grethe Ditlevsen in the pas de six in 3rd act of Napoli, 1909
- Choreographer: August Bournonville
- Music: Holger Simon Paulli; Edvard Helsted; Niels W. Gade; H.C. Lumbye
- Libretto: August Bournonville
- Premiere: 29 March 1842; Royal Danish Theatre, Copenhagen, Denmark
- Original ballet company: Royal Danish Ballet
- Characters: Gennaro; Veronica; Teresina; A monk Giacomo; Peppo; Giovanina; Pascarillo; Carlino; Golfo; Coralla; Argentina
- Setting: Naples and the Blue Grotto, Italy
- Genre: Romantic ballet

Napoli, or The Fisherman and His Bride is a ballet created in 1842 for Denmark's Royal Ballet by Danish choreographer and ballet master August Bournonville. It tells the story of Teresina, a young Italian girl who falls in love with Gennaro, a fisherman, and culminates in the marriage of the lovers.

== Synopsis ==
Act I (The Market). Teresina's mother, Veronica, who does not want her to marry poor Gennaro, introduces her to two other suitors. These are two older but rich men named Peppo and Giacomo. Teresina, much to her mother's distress, refuses them both and instead goes off to wait for Gennaro. When Gennaro arrives back at port, he and Teresina go to find Veronica and try to convince her that they should wed. Luckily for them, this task proves relatively easy once she sees how true the young couple's love is. Full of happiness Teresina and Gennaro sail off together.

Meanwhile, a group of entertainers come and put on a show for the townsfolk. However, a violent storm begins and the festivities come to an abrupt end. When the storm ends, Gennaro is found, but Teresina is not. Thinking she has drowned, Veronica openly mourns for her daughter and blames Gennaro for her death. So stricken by this turn of events Gennaro becomes so agitated that he almost commits suicide, but stops when he sees a statue of the Madonna. Soon Fra Ambrosio, the local monk, appears and gives him a picture of the Madonna telling him to go and find Teresina.

Act II (The Blue Grotto). Gennaro looks everywhere for Teresina and eventually finds her in the Blue Grotto, a magical place ruled by Golfo who has turned Teresina into a naiad (Fairy of the Sea). Because of the transformation, Teresina no longer remembers Gennaro. However, through faith, Teresina is changed back into a human and has her memory restored. Quickly, Gennaro and Teresina leave the Grotto to return to Naples.

Act III (The Wedding). When Teresina and Gennaro return the townsfolk are suspicious because they had thought Teresina was dead. Peppo and Giacomo even try to convince everyone that Gennaro is in league with the devil. This rumor is soon disproved and the wedding reception begins.

== Characters ==
- Teresina, a young Italian girl in love with Gennaro
- Gennaro, a young Italian fisherman in love with Teresina
- Veronica, Teresina's mother
- Peppo, a wealthy, old, lemonade seller who loves Teresina
- Giacomo, an older, but rich, macaroni seller who loves Teresina
- Fra' Ambrosio, a monk
- Golfo, the sea demon ruling the blue grotto

== Music ==
Several composers contributed to the score: Edvard Helsted and Holger Simon Paulli composed Acts I and III; Niels W. Gade created the blue grotto atmosphere for Act II, including a popular melody of the time, La Melancholie, composed by the violin virtuoso François Prume. Bournonville asked Hans Christian Lumbye, later to become the famous Tivoli Gardens composer, to provide the music for the concluding galop that follows Paulli's tarantella.

Bournonville recounts in his memoirs how, during a monotonous carriage journey, he spent hours humming what became the first three sections of the tarantella in Act III. The tarantella became the inspiration for the creation of the ballet.

In Act I, Rossini's slander aria from The Barber of Seville is used as the basis for Peppo's slander scene; the folk tune Te voglio ben assai is used in Act I to highlight the young lovers' feelings; the Latin hymn "O Santissima" is used in Act II to underscore the power of Christianity over Golfo's demonry.

== Genesis and criticism ==
The ballet was choreographed after Bournonville had visited Naples (it: Napoli), where he had been impressed by the local colour and the vibrancy of a city in constant movement. He strove to include the "brightness and dynamism" of the city in the work, ending the final act with a lively tarantella.

The ballet has been criticised for its lengthy pantomime in the first and second acts. The dancing really comes to forefront only in the third act. As the music is not the caliber of a Tchaikovsky or Glazunov, this can be a challenge. However, the piece has also been praised for its "local colour," the exceptional male solos, and is sometimes referred to as Bournonville's "signature work.")

== See also ==
- List of ballets by title
- Flower Festival in Genzano
