= Holger Simon Paulli =

Danish conductor and composer (1810–1891)

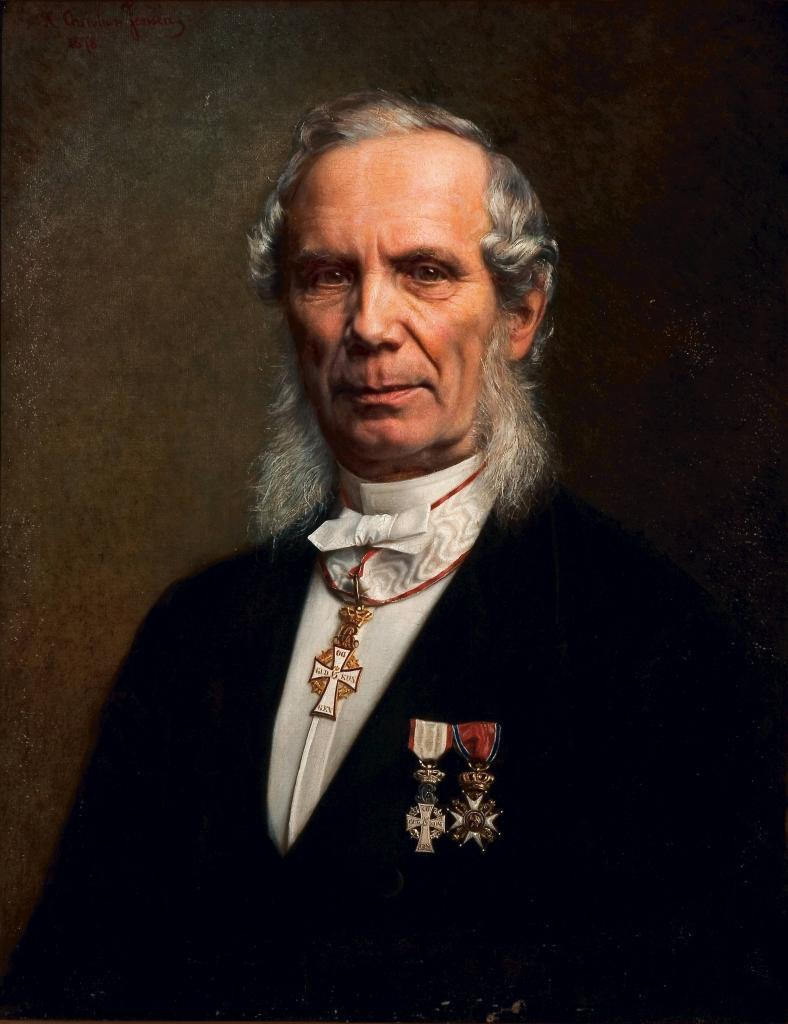
Holger Simon Paulli, 1878

Holger Simon Paulli (22 February 1810 – 23 December 1891) was a Danish conductor and composer. Paulli composed an opera, thirteen ballets, an overture, and pieces for violin and lieder.

== Biography ==
Paulli was born in Copenhagen, Denmark. He was a student of violinist and composer Claus Schall and of classical composer Frederik Thorkildsen Wexschall. During 1839–41, he undertook a study trip abroad to Germany, Austria, Italy, France and England. In 1849 he also became concertmaster. He joined the Royal Danish Orchestra and became its conductor in 1864, a position he filled for 20 years until the end of the 1882–1883 season. At the same time, he also conducted the orchestra of the Cecilia Association (Cæciliaforeningen). With his performances of Lohengrin and Die Meistersinger von Nürnberg he contributed greatly to the spread of Richard Wagner's work in Denmark.

Paulli was also a member of the management of the Copenhagen Conservatory from 1866 and was chairman of the Chamber Music Association during 1868–91. He conducted the Royal Danish Orchestra in the world premiere of Edvard Grieg's Piano Concerto in A minor, in the Casino Concert Hall in Copenhagen on 3 April 1869. The soloist was Norwegian pianist Edmund Neupert (1842–1888).

== Personal life ==
In 1842, Paulli married Nielsine Albertha Schouw. Their daughter Augusta Paulli (1843–1922) was an artist. Paulli died in Copenhagen and was buried in Assistens Cemetery.
