= Chloe Flower =

American musician, writer, and producer

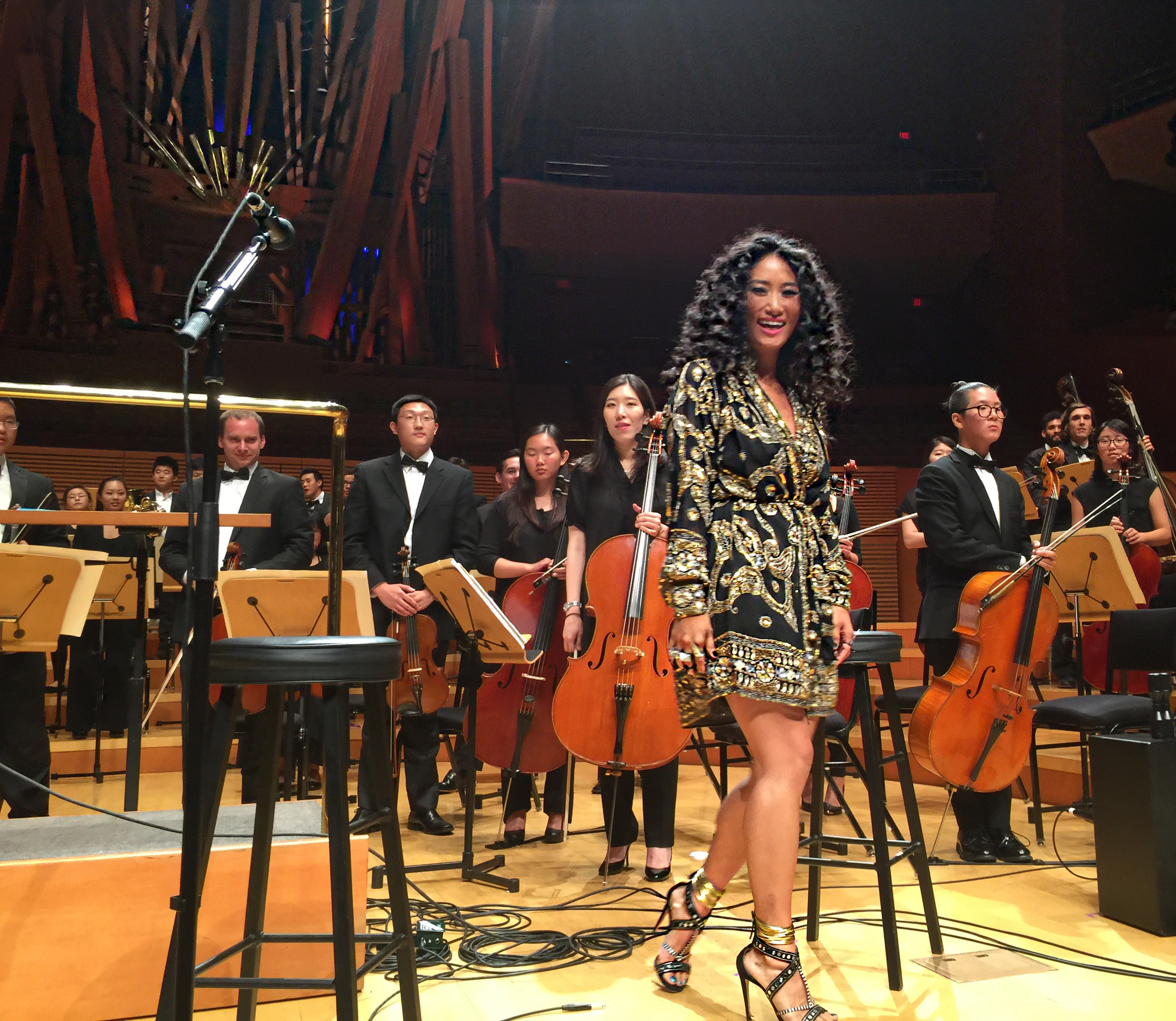
- Chloe Flower in 2013

Background information
- Born: Chloe Won; August 6, 1985 (age 41); Harrisburg, Pennsylvania, U.S.
- Genres: Classical music Classical-Crossover; Contemporary instrumental Pop; Instrumental Pop; Hip hop
- Occupations: Composer, Writer, Producer, Classical Pianist
- Instrument: Piano
- Years active: 2010–present
- Labels: Island Records, Sodapop
- Website: chloeflower.com

Chloe Won (born August 6, 1985), who is known professionally as Chloe Flower, is an American composer, writer, producer and classical pianist. She studied at Manhattan School of Music Pre-College and later at Royal Academy of Music in London.

== Career ==
In early 2011, Flower was discovered by producer Kenny “Babyface” Edmonds before signing to the Island Def Jam Records department, Sodapop. Her album, categorized as Contemporary Classical, was not released until 2021 on Sony Masterworks and features spoken word by author and public speaker Deepak Chopra.

In 2011, Flower opened the North American tour for Italian operatic pop trio, Il Volo.

In 2012, Flower was featured on Nas’ eleventh studio album, Life Is Good where she performed on, A Queen’s Story, produced by Salaam Remi. In November 2013, Flower was featured on Celine Dion’s eleventh English-language studio album, “Loved Me Back to Life” on “Lullaby.” In the same month, Flower was featured on the lead single “Know Bout Me” from American hip-hop producer Timbaland’s third studio album, Opera Noir.

In 2014, Flower scored the music for the short film I Choose directed by AnnaLynne McCord. In 2015, she scored "A Ballerina's Tale," a documentary on American Ballet Theatre Ballerina, Misty Copeland, directed by Nelson George. In July 2015, Flower scored the music for Nike and Kevin Hart's Health is Wealth campaign.

At the 2015 TCA Press Tour, Netflix announced its "Mike Epps: After Dark" special. The sold-out special was filmed live at the historic Orpheum Theatre featuring Flower's live classical music with Epps' stand-up comedy.

In July 2015, Flower gave her Walt Disney Hall debut to a sold-out audience. The closing song featured a historic classical version of Eric Clapton's hit song, "Change the World" which she performed with her producing partner, Kenny "Babyface" Edmonds.

In February 2019, Flower became an instant viral sensation for a spirited performance of the song "Money" by Cardi B at the Grammys. She performed the piece on a crystal piano on loan from the Liberace Museum.

In August 2019, she was selected as a Steinway Artist.

In July 2021, Flower released her debut album, Chloe Flower, with critical acclaim. The album debuted at No. 4 on the Classical Billboard Charts.

Flower has co-produced songs for 2 Chainz ("Pretty Girls Like Trap"), Céline Dion ("Love Me Back to Life"), Swae Lee ("Christmas at Swae's"), Questlove, Babyface, Nas ("Life Is Good") and Johnny Mathis. She has also performed as a feature performer with Meek Mill to a sold-out audience at Madison Square Garden, Cardi B, and Becky G.

In 2022, Flower became the first classical instrumentalist to perform as a soloist for Disney's Holiday Special and Magical Christmas Day Parade.

Flower composed and performed live all of the commercial intros and outros, the opening theme song, and the closing scene of the 80th Golden Globe Awards.

Flower has composed for Kevin Hart, Misty Copeland, Krug Champagne, The Rock n Roll Hall of Fame, and her music was part of the soundtrack for Paramount+ feature film, On the Come Up.

== Discography ==
Year	Title	Label
2021	Chloe Flower	Sony Masterworks
2023	Chloe Hearts Christmas	Sony Masterworks
2024	I Love Me More	Popsical Music Group

== Philanthropy ==
Since 2006 Flower has been working with The Somaly Mam Foundation, an organization that rescues children aged 3–17 from sex slavery. She works closely with AFESIP, an organization based in Cambodia that works to care for and secure the rights of those victimized by sex slavery and human trafficking. She also works closely with CAST LA, which assists persons trafficked for the purpose of forced labor and slavery-like practices and works toward ending all instances of such human rights violations.

In August 2012 Flower and Deepak Chopra, performed for a room full of patients in New York City as part of the Memorial Sloan-Kettering Cancer Center A-List program created by Tory Burch.

In 2013, Flower performed and served as a panelist on music education and human trafficking for the United Nations’ CTUAN Conference. Then in 2014, Flower partnered with LA county detention, probation, and foster promoting music education and anti-slavery for at-risk youth and performs regularly at Eastlake Detention Center. On July 30, 2014, Flower partnered with The United Nations Office of Drugs and Crime on the launch of the first UN recognized World Day Against Trafficking of Persons. Flower performed and spoke alongside Secretary-General Ban Ki-moon and the President of the General Assembly, John Ashe.

In 2015, Flower partnered with Art for Amnesty, a division of Amnesty International, which brings together world-renowned artists for musical projects that benefit Amnesty International.

Flower is an artist ambassador for the United Nations Office on Drug and Crime as well as the youngest board member of The Liberace Foundation. She has also partnered with Compton Unified School District to help bring awareness to Music Education.

== Awards ==
In May 2013, Jada Pinkett Smith and Lisa Ling presented Flower with the Creative Impact Award from CAST LA in recognition of her work in music education and in countering human trafficking.

In October 2022, Flower received The Last Girl's Impact Award from the organization, Aapne Aap, with Gloria Steinem in attendance, for her work to end human trafficking.
