= Syreeta Gates =

American archivist, filmmaker, and entrepreneur

Syreeta C. Gates
- Born: February 9, 1988 (age 37); Jamaica, Queens, New York
- Education: Hunter College (BA); New York University (MA)
- Occupations: Archivist, filmmaker, entrepreneur
- Relatives: Jessie Mae Jones Doherty (grandmother)
- Website: thegatespreserve.com mostincrediblestud.io

Syreeta Gates is an American archivist, filmmaker, and entrepreneur, recognized for her innovative work in preserving culture and celebrating Black creativity. She is the founder of The Gates Preserve, a multimedia experience company focused on archiving cultural history, and founder of Most Incredible Studio, a Black-owned creative studio specializing in making memory tangible using LEGO bricks as the medium. Gates is also the director of Shaping the Culture, a documentary that highlights the role of journalists in shaping hip-hop culture. She is also the first Black woman to compete on LEGO Masters.

== Early life and education ==
Gates grew up in Jamaica, Queens, New York, where she developed a deep appreciation for hip-hop and Black cultural heritage. She attended Hunter College where she earned her Bachelor's degree in Urban Youth Culture than later attended New York University's Tisch School of Arts, earning a Masters of Arts degree in Moving Image Archiving and Preservation in 2020. She always notes Brittan Dunham as being her inspiration and reason for why she decided to attend NYU. During her time at NYU, she focused on the intersection of media, culture, and preservation, laying the foundation for her career in archiving and storytelling.

== Career ==
=== The Gates Preserve ===
In 2015, Gates founded The Gates Preserve, a company dedicated to documenting and preserving culture and Black history through multimedia storytelling and experiences. In such a way so it last forever. The organization focuses on archiving historical moments, artifacts, interviews, cultural milestones, and stories from hip-hop's evolution to ensure its legacy is accessible for educational research for future generations. Her archival work gained national attention for documenting journalism through the documentary Shaping The Culture which explores the legacy of hip-hop magazines such as The Source and Vibe.

=== Most Incredible Studio ===
In 2018, Gates co-founded and launched Most Incredible Studio, which makes memory visible through LEGO bricks. The studio produces limited-edition LEGO-inspired kits that celebrate culture, and community narratives via sculptures and minifigures.

Notable collaborations include:

- Mini Jimi - A collaboration with the Museum of Pop Culture and the Hendrix estate, transforming Jimi Hendrix into a LEGO figure.
- A Decade of Greatness - A collaboration with Paper Planes that celebrated their 10 year anniversary with an exclusive in-store crown-building class.
- Because Of You: Legacy in Focus - A collaboration with Because of Them We Can, celebrating Black history and the power of storytelling.
- How We Roll - Partnering with Black Archives, this LEGO set honors the cultural significance of roller skating in Black communities.

== Filmography ==
Gates has produced and appeared in several films and documentaries focused on culture, books, and hip-hop.

=== Director ===
- Shaping The Culture — A documentary chronicling the history of journalism, spotlighting publications (The Source, VIBE, Honey, Ego Trip, Stress, Rap Pages, etc.) and the journalists who shaped hip-hop culture, featuring dream hampton, Greg Tate, and Minya "Miss Info" Oh, and more.
- Young Schomburg (2020) — A documentary short film that archives journalism through interviews with key leaders in hip-hop, it digs into the emotional rollercoaster behind the making and archiving of the world's most influential pop culture phenomenon.

=== Archival researcher ===
- A Ballerina's Tale (2015) — Contributed archival research for the documentary about ballerina Misty Copeland.

=== Producer ===
- Shaping the Culture (Ongoing) — An upcoming documentary examining the evolution of hip-hop journalism.
- Ladies First: A Story of Women in Hip-Hop — Gates was featured in this series, which examines women's contributions to the genre.
- The Booksellers (2019) — Featured in a documentary about rare book dealers in New York City. Gates appears, highlighting her role in connecting culture to larger conversations about collecting and preservation.

== Media recognition ==
Gates has been profiled by Red Bull as one of its "Heroes of the Year"., highlighted in Forbes for her social entrepreneurship and featured in publications including The New York Times, Vogue, Essence, Ebony, and Black Enterprise for her contributions to cultural preservation and Black storytelling. Gates was also featured in Glamour Magazine's top 20 under 25.

== Inspiration behind archiving ==
Syreeta Gates' work on preserving culture and Black history was shaped by personal experiences and influential figures in her life. While her professional work (The Gates Preserve, Most Incredible Studio, and her documentaries) reflect her public work, the roots of her archiving trace back to formative family experiences and mentorship.

- The death of Gates' grandmother Jessie Mae Jones Doherty just three days after she turned 21 had a profound impact on her and inspired Gates to safeguard stories and legacies before they are lost.
- Her uncle's introduction to hip-hop music and culture provided her with early exposure to the art form and inspired her to archive the culture.
- While watching Beyoncé's Lemonade, Gates read through the credits and discovered references to Brittan, a mentor figure who had played a pivotal role in preserving artists' narratives. Learning about Brittan's impact inspired her to seek guidance and mentorship in her own career in archiving. Mentorship from Brittan provided encouragement and direction as she explored the field.

== Community work ==
Beyond her archiving and media projects, Gates has been active in community-based cultural initiatives.

In 2015, she organized "Operation Skittles", a large-scale school art transformation project at August Martin High School in Jamaica, Queens. In collaboration with graffiti collective 5Pointz and The Future Project, Gates brought together artists including Meres One and Marie Cecile Flageul to repaint the school's beige corridors with vibrant murals. Within 48 hours, the team created imagery of women of color, activist symbols, and a "Dreamer Hallway" intended to uplift student morale and reimagine the learning environment through art. During this time, Gates served as a Dream Director and later Chief Dream Director with The Future Project, where she focused on empowering students to pursue their passions and transform school culture through creativity, mentorship, and community-drive projects.
