= Thriller 40 (film) =

- Film poster
- Directed by: Nelson George
- Starring: Michael Jackson
- Cinematography: Justin Kane
- Edited by: Darrin Roberts; Fred Koschmann
- Distributed by: Sony Music Entertainment
- Release date: December 2, 2023
- Running time: 90 minutes
- Country: United States
- Language: English

Thriller 40 is a 2023 documentary film about the 40th anniversary of Michael Jackson's 1982 album Thriller. The film, directed by Nelson George, was released in the United States on December 2, 2023. It aired on Showtime and was streamed on Paramount+ only for Showtime subscribers. Internationally, it debuted the same day in the U.K., Australia, Canada, Italy, France, Germany, Switzerland, Austria, Latin America, and South Korea. On October 27, 2023, the trailer for the documentary was released. A 40th-anniversary edition reissue of Thriller (1982) of the same title was released in 2022.

== Cast ==
- Michael Jackson (archive footage)
- Mary J. Blige
- John Branca
- Misty Copeland
- Ed Eckstine
- Matt Forger
- Myles Frost
- Nelson George
- Robert Hilburn
- Steven Ivory
- Paul Jackson Jr.
- Jimmy Jam
- John Landis
- Deborah Nadoolman Landis
- Terry Lewis
- Steve Lukather
- Anthony Marinelli
- Maxwell
- Ole Obermann
- Greg Phillinganes
- Polo G
- Mark Ronson
- Raphael Saadiq
- Brooke Shields
- Rich + Tone
- Usher
- Oren Waters
- Julia Waters
- Maxine Waters
- Will.i.am

== Reception ==
Richard Roeper of the Chicago Sun-Times gave the film three out of four stars. He wrote that it's "an upbeat and well-paced celebration of the making of the album that yielded seven Top 10 singles and inspired a number of seminal moments of cultural significance, from Jackson breaking racial barriers on MTV to the legendary appearance on Motown's 25th anniversary special to the release of music videos such as 'Beat It' and 'Thriller.'"

Brian Lowry of CNN said, "Nelson George has delivered an unabashed celebration of Jackson's musical genius, and the landmark album that propelled him into a pop stratosphere where few could lay a glove on him." He felt the documentary "consciously and effectively brings the focus back to the music and the thrills he delivered as a performer", as well as "all the other ways Jackson influenced the industry, and less on the man himself."

Rae Alexandra of KQED observed that Thriller 40 "illustrates what it took for Jackson to be considered a true 'crossover artist' — a mainstream pop star rather than an R&B one — at a time when racial divisions in the industry were uncompromising". She concluded, "Thriller 40 offers an immersive nostalgia and a reminder of one of the last points in pop culture before it felt like we’d seen everything."

Neal Justin of the Star Tribune compared Jackson's phenomenon to that of Taylor Swift, and felt that Thriller 40 "shows how the King of Pop had a similar — if not more significant — influence on pop culture." He concluded that it "may not convince Swifties to wig out over 'Billie Jean.' But it will show them that history only repeats itself."

Dean Karayanis of The New York Sun felt that "Thriller 40 presents the greatest album of all time in stark relief, not relying on nostalgia or star power. Jackson may be gone, but our 'Thriller' world is still spinning — and thanks to his talent, nothing else, it seems, can beat it."
