= Elizabeth Aldrich =

American dance historian (born 1947)

- Born: Elizabeth Aileen Aldrich; February 26, 1947 (age 79); Appleton, Wisconsin, U.S.
- Education: Ohio University, Athens; New England Conservatory of Music, Boston; The New School
- Occupation: Choreographer • Archivist
- Spouse: Brian Russell Olson (m. 2006)

Elizabeth Aldrich (born February 26, 1947) is an American dance historian, choreographer, writer, lecturer, consultant, administrator, curator, and archivist. She is known for her research, performance, choreography, teaching, and lectures on Renaissance and Baroque court dance, nineteenth-century social dance, and twentieth-century ragtime dance.

== Early life, education, and training ==
Elizabeth Aileen Aldrich was born in Appleton, Wisconsin, a daughter of Stanley J. Aldrich, an astrophysicist, and Donna J. (née Olsen) Aldrich, a public school music teacher. At age five, she began her dance training in ballet, tap, and acrobatics classes at the Vera Lynn School of Dance in Los Angeles, where her family had moved. Soon after, encouraged by her mother, she added music lessons to her dance training as she began taking instruction on the cello from Mary Lewis in Wrightswood, California. When her family moved again, to Maine, she continued her studies in dance, music, and acrobatics, in which she won the state floor exercise championship in 1965. After graduation from high school in Windham, Maine, she attended Ohio University in Athens (1963-1967), where she studied modern dance and dance history, and the New England Conservatory of Music in Boston (1968-1972), where she studied cello as well as ballet and early dance of the Renaissance and Baroque periods. She earned a bachelor of music degree from the conservatory in 1970 and a master's degree in 1972. Thereafter, she moved to New York City and continued her dance training at the Melissa Hayden Studio (1973-1975) and at The New School (1973-1979), where she studied modern dance with Julie Sander and ballet with Saturo Shimasaki.

== Career ==
Aldrich has had worked in a series of related careers, including as a performer, choreographer, workshop leader and lecturer, writer, project manager and administrator, consultant, and curator and archivist of dance materials.

=== Performer ===
As a professional musician, Aldrich first joined the New England Consort of Viols as a player of the viola da gamba, a bowed, fretted, and stringed instrument similar to the cello that was popular during the Renaissance and Baroque periods. Aldrich toured with the group and participated in the recording of William Byrd's Musik for Voyces & Violls (Titanic Records Ti-26). She was also a member of the Court Dance Company of New York, a professional company specializing in period dance, and was co-artistic director (1978-1991) as well as a performer. In summer festivals at Castle Hill on the Crane Estate in Ipswich, Massachusetts, she danced in the first staged American productions with period instruments of Henry Purcell's Dido and Aeneas, Jean-Baptiste Lully's Le Bourgeois gentilhomme, and Claudio Monteverdi's Orfeo, all directed by Thomas Kelly. She then appeared in productions at Lincoln Center's Alice Tully Hall in New York City, the Cleveland Art Museum, and the Folger Shakespeare Library, the Smithsonian Institution, and the John F, Kennedy Center for the Performing Arts in Washington, D.C. The company also toured abroad, giving performances in England, Switzerland, and Chile.

=== Choreographer ===
As a scholar of early dance, Aldrich received choreographic commissions from the Court Dance Company of New York, the Dance Division of the Juilliard School, and the New York Baroque Dance Company. As a specialist in nineteenth-century and early twentieth-century social dance, she also created choreography for American Ballroom Theater, the Jane Austen Society of North America, the Smithsonian Institution, and Festival Folklórico de Taxco, México. In 1997, she created a program of marches, reels, quadrilles, and waltzes for the centennial celebration of the Great Hall in the Jefferson Building of the Library of Congress in Washington. The program also included a reinterpretation of Loie Fuller's famous Butterfly Dance, a solo performed by Jody Sperling. In New York, Aldrich set dances for David Kneuss's 2002 production of Mozart's Don Giovanni, which was performed throughout Japan under the baton of Seiji Ozawa.

Aldrich is known particularly for her film choreography, as she has specialized in creating large-scale ballroom scenes from the 1840s through the 1880s as well as social dances from the 1920s through the 1950s. Her work has appeared in six Merchant-Ivory productions: The Europeans (1979), Quartet (1981), Mr. and Mrs. Bridge (1990), The Remains of the Day (1993), Jefferson in Paris (1993), and Surviving Picasso (1996), all directed by James Ivory. Other films for which she has choreographed dance scenes include The Age of Innocence (1994), directed by Martin Scorsese; Washington Square (1997), directed by Agnieszka Holland; and The Haunted Mansion (2003), directed by Rob Minkus.

=== Workshop leader and lecturer ===
As a presenter, Aldrich has conducted workshops and given lectures and speeches for numerous scholarly organizations in North America, South America, Europe, and Asia. The topics of her presentations have been wide-ranging: from Renaissance and Baroque court dance to social dances of the nineteenth century; from etiquette in the court of Louis XIV to ragtime dances in American ballrooms and nightclubs; from table manners in the nineteenth century to Balanchine's Broadway shows of the twentieth; from the costumes of Mozart's world to dance in Hollywood films, from the Viennese waltz to jitterbug.

In the United States, Aldrich has delivered papers at the Library of Congress and at meetings of the Society of Dance History Scholars, the Congress on Research in Dance, the Society for Historians of American Foreign Relations, the Popular Culture Association, the Society for American Music, and the Mozart Society of America. Abroad, she has made presentations at the University of London, Dvorana Dance (Czech Republic), the Escuela Moderna de Musica y Danza (Chile), the Institut de Sainte-Ode (Belgium), the Schola Cantorum Basilienses (Switzerland), the Hochschule für Musik (Germany), and at various venues in France, Hong Kong, and Mexico. She delivered keynote speeches at annual meetings of the American Musicology Society (1991) in Hattiesburg, Mississippi; the Congress of Latin American Choreographers (1992) in Caracas, Venezuela; the Midwest Outdoor Museum Association (1993) in Neenah, Wisconsin; and the Dance Critics Association (2007) in New York City.

=== Manager and administrator ===
Aldrich's administrative career began in 1974 with a job as assistant to arts consultant George Alan Smith. She worked with him until 1983 on fund-raising, development, and long-range planning for a variety of arts organizations, including the Caramoor Center for Music and the Arts, the Hudson River Museum, the American Symphony Orchestra, the Martha Graham Dance Company, and the San Francisco Ballet. A founding member and a co-artistic director of the Historic Dance Foundation (1977-1993), she was also one of the founders of the International Early Dance Institute at Goucher College in Towson, Maryland, and was an active participant for several years (1987-1991). During this time, she also served as president of the Society of Dance History Scholars (1989-1992) and as managing director of the World Dance Alliance's first General Assembly of the Americas (1991).

In 1994, Aldrich was hired by the New York branch of Oxford University Press as managing editor of the International Encyclopedia of Dance, a reference project that had failed during development at two other academic publishers. Working with founding editor Selma Jeanne Cohen, the editorial board (George Dorris, Nancy Goldner, Beate Gordon, Nancy Reynolds, David Vaughan, Suzanne Youngerman), and the staff of Oxford's Scholarly and Professional Reference Department, she was a major force in rescuing the project and bringing it to a successful conclusion with publication of a six-volume set in 1998. Thereafter, she worked as a freelance editor on several Oxford reference projects and as contributing editor for dance on The Grove Dictionary of American Music, second edition, edited by Charles Hiroshi Garrett. Published in print by Oxford University Press in 2013, it is also available as a component of Oxford's Grove Music Online.

After publication of Oxford's dance encyclopedia, Aldrich continued her administrative work as chair of the editorial board of the Society of Dance History Scholars (1998-2002). She then found her next managerial job as executive director of Dance Heritage Coalition, a national alliance of institutions holding significant collections documenting the history of dance, headquartered in Washington, D.C. During her seven-year tenure in this position (1999-2006), she initiated a number of important projects, including the National Dance Heritage Leadership Forum, America's Irreplaceable Dance Treasures, the National Dance Heritage Videotape Registry, the Fellowship Program in Dance Documentation and Preservation, and the Digital Videotape Preservation Project. As writer or editor, she also was responsible for a number of publications issued by the coalition.

=== Consultant ===
Aldrich has served as consultant for a number of arts organizations. She has been a member of the Advisory Board of Early Music America (1992-1993); a core consultant for the eight-part series "Dancing," produced by the Public Broadcasting System (1993); a member of the Board of Visitors for the New England Conservatory of Music (2003-2005); and a panelist for the National Endowment for the Arts and the National Endowment for the Humanities (1990-2013). For the George Balanchine Foundation, she was one of a group of principal researchers for the Popular Balanchine project, devoted to documenting Mr. Balanchine's work on Broadway shows and Hollywood films (2000-2002).

As consultant to the Music Division of the Library of Congress in 1998, Aldrich was responsible for writing narratives and reconstructing steps and step sequences for accompanying video clips as part of "An American Ballroom Companion, ca. 1490-1920." The project mounted over two hundred social dance manuals from the library's collection. A few years later, Aldrich returned to the Music Division of the Library of Congress as the project director responsible for mounting the Katherine Dunham website (2005), designed to highlight the library's extensive collection of Dunham memorabilia.

=== Curator and archivist ===
In 2006 Aldrich was once again employed by the Music Division of the Library of Congress, as she was named to the newly created position of Curator of Dance. Among her first tasks was identifying, processing, and creating finding aids for twenty archival collections that had been acquired between 1980 and 2004. Thereafter, she acquired, processed, and created finding aids for more than thirty new archival collections of memorabilia, many of which supported the Martha Graham Collection. Among them are a number of collections of early members of Graham's company: Jane Dudley, Sophie Maslow, Helen McGehee, Ethel Winter, and Yuriko. As a result, the library is now the primary location for the scholarly study of the biography of Graham and of the history of her works and her company. Other acquisitions made by Aldrich ranged from the collection of stage and screen star Marge Champion to that of the New Dance Group, a revolutionary performing group active from the 1930s to the 1960s. Just before Aldrich retired from the library in 2013, she was instrumental in the acquisition of the collection of American Ballet Theatre (1940 to the present day), a significant addition to the library's holdings on the performing arts in the United States.

During her tenure at the library, Aldrich also wrote its first "Collection Overview for Dance," its first "Collection Policy Statement for Dance," and a comprehensive Guide to Special Collections in Dance, which describes every dance and dance-related special collection located in the library's Music Division, covering ballet, folk and traditional dance, musical theater dance, and social dance. She was curator or co-curator of four important exhibitions mounted at the library and that were afterward displayed at the Dorothy Chandler Pavilion in Los Angeles.

- Alvin Ailey American Dance Theater: 30 Years Cultural Ambassador to the World (2008).
- Sergei Diaghilev and His World: A Centennial Celebration of Diaghilev's Ballets Russes, 1909-1929 (2009).
- Politics and the Dancing Body (2012), curated with Victoria Phillips.
- American Ballet Theatre: Touring the Globe for 73 Years (2014), curated with Victoria Phillips and Joanna Dee Das.

Aldrich was also responsible for content and narrative for online presentations of library materials on the Ballets Russes de Sergei Diaghilev, on Bronislava Nijinska, and on Martha Graham. While undertaking all these tasks she also organized numerous displays of dance materials for colleges, universities, special guests, and congressional representatives.

== Selected works ==
- From the Ballroom to Hell: Grace and Folly in Nineteenth-Century Dance. Evanston, Ill.: Northwestern University Press, 1991.
- "Social Dancing in Schubert's World," in Schubert's World: Vienna in the Reign of Francis I, edited by Raymond Erickson. New Haven, Conn.: Yale University Press, 1997.
- "Foreword," in International Encyclopedia of Dance, 6 vols., edited by Selma Jeanne Cohen and others. New York: Oxford University Press, 1998.
- "Sustaining America's Dance Legacy: How the Field of Dance Heritage Can Build Capacity and Broaden Access to Dance in the Next Ten Years." Washington, D.C.: Dance Heritage Coalition, 2000.
- The Extraordinary "Dance Book T.B. 1826": An Anonymous Manuscript in Facsimile. New York: Pendragon Press, 2000. Includes introductory material by Elizabeth Aldrich, Sandra Noll Hammond, and Armand Russell.
- America's Irreplaceable Dance Treasures: The First 100. Washington, D.C.: Dance Heritage Coalition, 2001.
- Summary essays on research: Mr. Strauss Goes to Boston (1943) and The Chocolate Soldier (1947), for Popular Balanchine, a project of the George Balanchine Foundation; dossiers submitted in 2002 and deposited in the Jerome Robbins Dance Division of the New York Public Library for the Performing Arts in 2005. See Popular Balanchine, Guide to the Dossiers, at http://balanchine.org/balanhine/03.pc.
- A Copyright Primer for the Dance Community. Washington, D.C.: Dance Heritage Coalition, 2003.
- "Western Social Dance: An Overview of the Collection." Washington, D.C.: Library of Congress, 2004.
- "Social Dance," in Encyclopedia of the Victorian Era, edited by James Eli Adams, Tom Pendergast, and Sara Pendergast. New York: Grolier Academic Reference, 2004.
- "Chile, Cool," in Drinkology: Wine, A Guide to the Grape, by James Waller. New York: Stewart, Tabori, & Chang, 2005.
- "Documentation, Preservation, and Access: Ensuring a Future for Dance's Legacy," in Teaching Dance Studies, edited by Judith Chazin-Bennahum. New York: Routledge, 2005.
- "Drooping Elbows and Stately Grace: 'Movie Minuets' of the 1930s," in Proceedings of the annual conference of the Dolmetsch Historical Dance Society, "The Minuet in Time and Space," All Saints Pastoral Centre, London, 10–11 March 2007.
- "Re-Thinking the Physical Library: The Dangers of Missed Opportunities in the Digital Age," in Proceedings of the thirtieth annual conference of the Society of Dance History Scholars, "Rethinking Practice and Theory / Répense pratique et théorie," Centre National de la Danse, Paris, 21–24 June 2007.
- "Disappointments and Delays: The Commissioning of Appalachian Spring, Mirror before Me, and Imagined Wing," in Proceedings of the thirty-first annual conference of the Society of Dance History Scholars, "Looking Back / Moving Forward," Skidmore College, Saratoga Springs, N.Y., 12–15 June 2008.
- "Plunge Not into the Mire of Worldly Folly: Nineteenth-Century and Early Twentieth-Century Religious Objections to Social Dance in the United States," in Dance, Human Rights, and Social Justice: Dignity in Motion, edited by Naomi Jackson and Toni Shapiro-Phim. Lanham, Md.: Scarecrow Press, 2008.
- "The Civilizing of America's Ballrooms: The Revolutionary War to 1890," in Ballroom, Boogie, Shimmy Sham, Shake: A Social and Popular Dance Reader, edited by Julie Malnig. Evanston: University of Illinois Press, 2008.
- "The Dance Heritage Coalition's Fair Use in Copyright Project," in Protokolle of the symposium "Urheberrecht an Tanzwerken im digitalen Raum," Akademie der Künste, Berlin, 15–16 April 2010.
- "Letters from the Heart: Martha Graham's Correspondence with Benjamin Garber in the 1960s and 1970s," in Proceedings of the thirty-third annual conference of the Society of Dance History Scholars, "Dance and Spectacle," University of Surrey, Guilford, and The Place, London, 8–11 July 2010.
- "Race and Revolution: African-American Modern Dance as a Cold War Weapon," in Proceedings of the annual conference of the Society for Historians of American Foreign Relations, "Revolutionary Aftermath," University of Connecticut at Storrs, Hartford, Conn., 28–30 June 2012.
- "American Bandstand," "Galop," "Schottische," "Two-Step," and "Waltz" in The Grove Dictionary of American Music, 2d ed, edited by Charles Hiroshi Garrett. New York: Oxford University Press, 2013. Aldrich also contributed brief biographical articles on Vernon and Irene Castle, Pierre Dulaine and Yvonne Marceau, Erick Hawkins, Harriet Hoctor, Alan Kriegsman, and Albertina Rasch.
- "Title to come," in Dance in American Culture, edited by Sally R. Sommer. Tallahassee: Florida State University Press, 2015.

== Personal life ==
Aldrich married Brian Russell Olson in December 2006. They reside most of the year in their home on the coast of Chile, some miles northwest of Santiago. She serves as a dance history and archival consultant to various Chilean organizations and institutions.
