= Episodes (ballet) =

Ballet by Martha Graham and George Balanchine

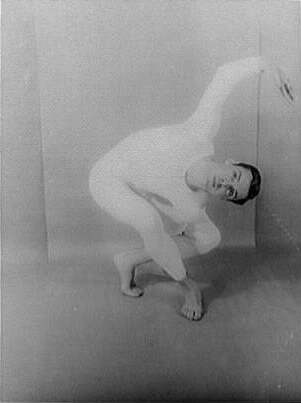
- Paul Taylor in Episodes
- Choreographer: Martha Graham; George Balanchine
- Music: Anton Webern
- Premiere: May 14, 1959; City Center of Music and Dance
- Original ballet company: Martha Graham Dance Company; New York City Ballet
- Design: Karinska; David Hays
- Genre: modern dance neoclassical ballet

Episodes is a ballet choreographed by Martha Graham and George Balanchine, to compositions by Anton Webern. The ballet was a co-production between the Martha Graham Dance Company and Balanchine's New York City Ballet (NYCB). Though it was conceived to be a collaboration between Graham and Balanchine, leading choreographers in modern dance and neoclassical ballet respectively, they ultimately worked separately on the ballet's two halves. Episodes I was choreographed by Graham, for dancers from her company and four NYCB members, and depicts Mary, Queen of Scots remembering the events in her life before her execution. Episodes II, by Balanchine, is completely plotless, and made for members of the NYCB and Graham dancer Paul Taylor, who originated a solo. The ballet uses all seven orchestral compositions by Webern.

Episodes premiered on May 14, 1959, at the City Center of Music and Dance. Starting in 1960, Balanchine's section is presented as a standalone piece, with Taylor's solo removed the following year. Since then, Balanchine's Episodes had been revived by both NYCB and other ballet companies, with Taylor's solo performed in a few rare instances. The complete Episodes has not been seen in full since 1959, and the Graham section had only been revived once, in 1980, with the choreography significantly revised.

== Choreography and analysis ==
The program for the premiere of Episodes described it as an 'homage by dancers to a great composer." In performances of the complete ballet, a five-minute intermission occurs between Episodes I and Episodes II. Most performances of Episodes since 1960 only include Balanchine's Episodes II. Graham dancer Ethel Winter commented on the aesthetic differences between Episodes I and Episodes II,

I was listening to a couple of people talking. Somebody asked the difference between modern dance and ballet and how would someone know between the two. So the other one said, "Oh, they will be in bare feet in modern dance and they will be flexing their feet with just tights on—no costumes." Of course, Episodes was completely the opposite. Martha's company were the ones in shoes and full costumes; Balanchine's New York City Ballet [dancers] were in tights, flexing their feet and arms. Somebody must have been very confused!

=== Episodes I ===
The program described Episodes I as follows,

Miss Graham's section of Episodes deals with the last minutes in the life of Mary Queen of Scots. It takes place at the scaffold and the characters are men and women who might well have been in the Queen's last thoughts. Bothwell, the man she most loved, was her third husband; determined to be King, he had used her to serve his ambition and treated her, so the court said, 'like a drab'. Darnley (her second husband), Rizzio and Chastelard, all three had died because of her. The four Marys, her ladies in waiting, had been her constant companions. Elizabeth of England, whom she had never met, was her cousin and enemy, and had signed the warrant for her execution. Miss Graham's choreography is a kind of dramatic fantasia about Mary Stuart's ultimate pride, about the façade of royalty and what must have been behind it.

The two pieces of music Graham used, Passacaglia, op. 1 and Six Pieces, op. 6, are Webern's earlier works, that are more orchestrated compared to his later works. The dancers are dressed in full 16th-century costumes. The set features a black platform at the back of the stage, decorated with heraldic symbols, with a black box at the center.

In 1980, Graham significantly revised the choreography, with more focus on the two queens, and Mary's three lovers removed. The solos were also rechoreographed.

=== Episodes II ===
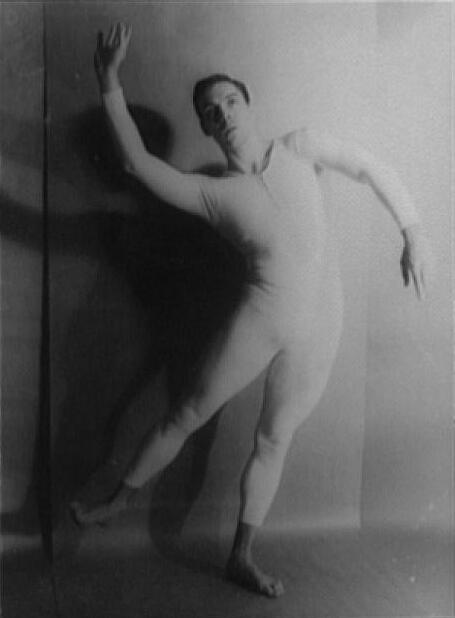
Paul Taylor in Episodes

The program only described Episodes II, "George Balanchine's section of the ballet refers to no story." Balanchine later said that in choreographing Episodes II, he "had try to paint or design time with bodies in order to create a resemblance between the dance and what was going on in the sound." He used four of Webern's later works, written after he began exploring serialism and inspired by Arnold Schoenberg's twelve-tone technique. Additionally, Balanchine used Webern's Ricercata, rearrangements of the ricercars in Bach's The Musical Offering. The dancers are dressed in practice clothes, while the minimal set features four poles.

Episodes II begins with Symphony, op. 21. It is danced by two lead dancers and three other couples.| Balanchine described, "As the music starts, dryly and carefully. The boys touch the girls on the shoulder; they join hands then, pose briefly, and begin to move together. One couple leads the others but soon, just as the instrumentation shifts and develops, the other pairs react to the music differently. The dance is about the music, it is meant to look that way."

The second part, set to Five Pieces, op. 10, is a pas de deux. Author Jennifer Homans described the two dancers "in total darkness, each under a separate spotlight... Their steps were hieratic, angular, with splayed, trapped movements and tangled deadweight arms, and they were engrossed with each other but disconnected, with a musical but no narrative arc. At one point in this section, the man, as Homans described, lifts the woman "upside down on his back with her legs split like antler's horns around his head, which now seemed to emerge from her crotch."

The third part, set to Concerto, op. 24, is also a pas de deux, with four women accompanying the two dancers. Balanchine described, "The boy moves the girl as the composer moves his instrument." Allegra Kent, who originated the female role, called the section "a dance conversation," and the role "a continuation of his interest in the abstract use of the body and the man manipulating the woman."

Variations, op. 30 is a solo that was originated by Graham dancer Paul Taylor, and excluded from most stagings of the ballet. The solo is danced barefoot, and has three sections. The first two feature the same choreography, albeit danced to different music and with different intentions. Author Richard Buckle commented, "The white-clad dancer was called upon to clutch himself, wrap himself up and tie himself into such perverse knots that his number seemed almost a defiant demonstration by Balanchine that he could be as crazy as any 'modern' choreographer or dancer in existence." Taylor described, "Each phrase is densely packed with complicated moves – knotted arrangements that, spatially, all stay in one small spot. Very few of them come from the traditional ballet vocabulary, and when they do, are usually reshaped into flex-footed versions or inverted." Balanchine gave Taylor the imagery of a fly in a glass of milk, and Taylor in turn thought of a fly stuck in a "deadly vortex of its own making... an epigram about self-ordained patterns and death."

The ballet ends with the Ricercata, danced by two principals and a corps de ballet of thirteen women. Author Nancy Reynolds commented, "In contrapuntal manner, each dance movement – by a block of the ensemble or the soloists – is an equal component of the whole stage picture at any single moment. Most movements are brief, often using only one part of the body at a time. The groups move fugally, in imitation (more or less freely) of the restatements of the musical object." Dance historian Angela Kane believed that Balanchine's choice of music for the closing section "was to highlight distinctions between past and present, both in terms of musical lineage from Bach's baroque style to Webern's progressive serialism, and also between Graham's historical 'fantasia' and Balanchine wanting to move forward choreographically."

== Development ==
=== Background and conception ===
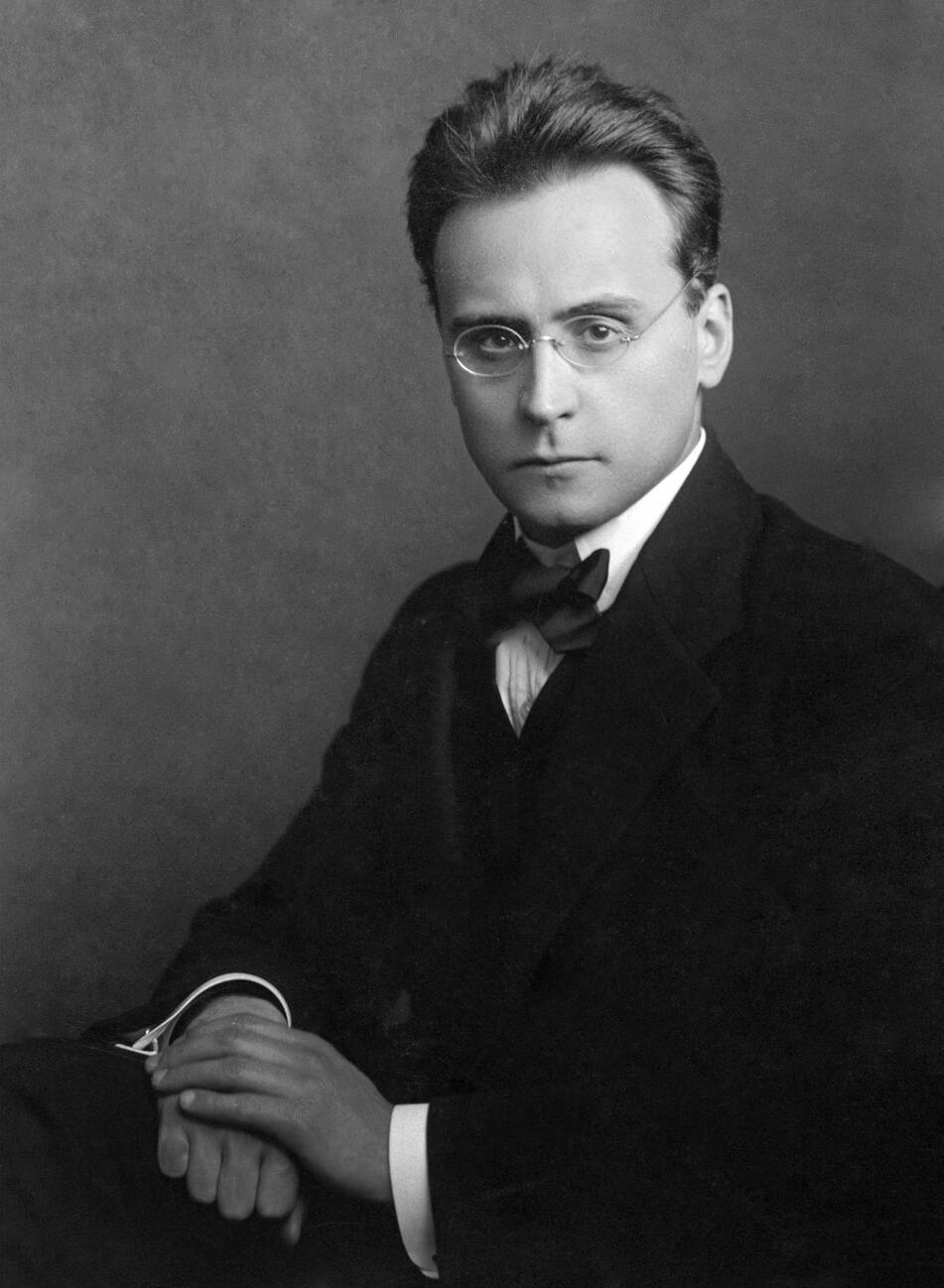
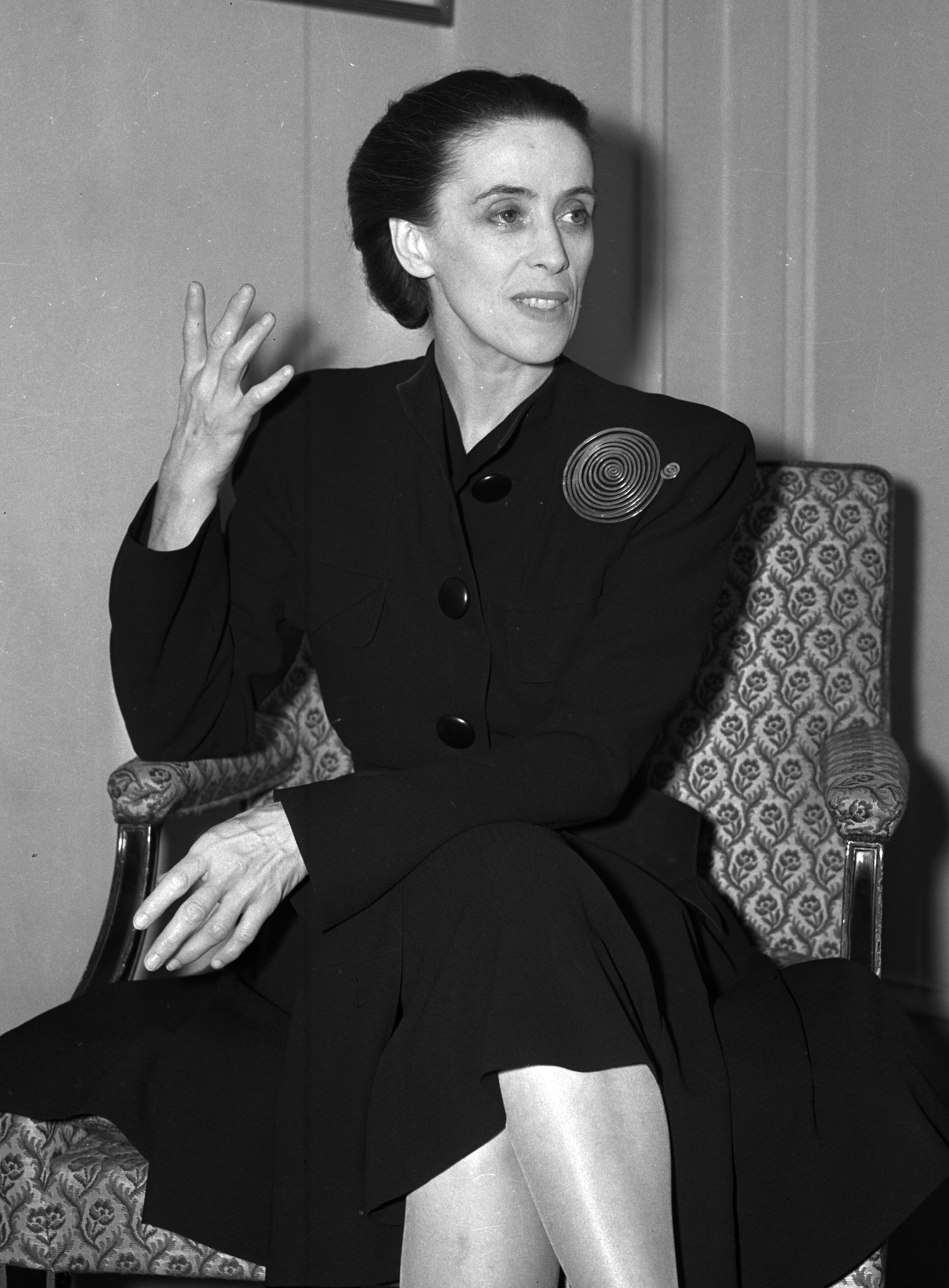
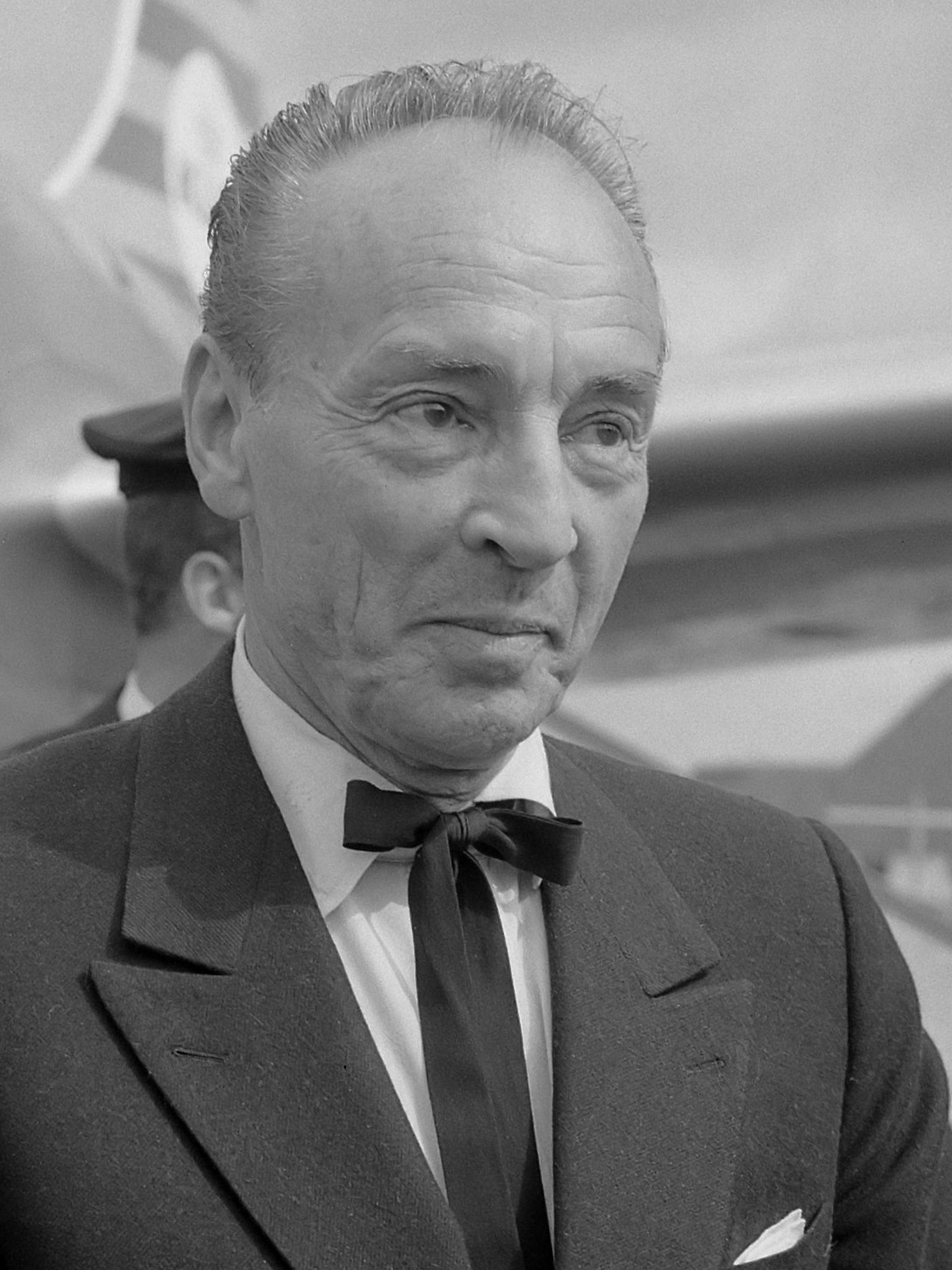
(Left to right) Anton Webern, Martha Graham and George Balanchine

Balanchine worked primarily in neoclassical ballet, and co-founded the New York City Ballet with Lincoln Kirstein in 1948. Meanwhile, Graham was a modern dance choreographer, and usually worked with her own company, the Martha Graham Dance Company, and had created the Graham technique. Kirstein, also the general director of NYCB, often criticized modern dance, including a 1934 article in The New Republic, in which he attacked Graham. Despite his continued dislike of modern dance, he acknowledge in 1937 that he "was unequipped for her simplicity and self-blinded by her genuinely primitive expression." A collaboration between Balanchine and Graham was first pitched by painter Pavel Tchelitchew in December 1935. He suggested to the two choreographers and Kirstein that they collaborate on "an evening's spectacle involving three archetypes: Don Juan, Don Quixote, Hamlet," while Graham would be the corresponding "feminine archetype." The idea never came to fruition.

In the 1950s, Balanchine began listening to music by Anton Webern, after being introduced to his works by Igor Stravinsky. Balanchine spoke about Webern's works

Webern's orchestral music fills the air like molecules; it is written for atmosphere. The first time I heard it, I knew it could be danced to. It seemed to me like Mozart and Stravinsky, music that can be danced to because it leaves the mind free to see the dancing. In listening to composers like Beethoven and Brahms, every listener has his own ideas, paints his own picture of what the music represents. How can I, a choreographer, try to squeeze a dancing body into a picture that already exists in someone's mind? It simply won't work. But it will with Webern.

He had two ideas of using Webern's music for a ballet that were abandoned, before deciding to use all seven of Webern's orchestral compositions, which last under an hour together. Kirstein then suggested having Graham contribute on the choreography. Graham was approached about the ballet by Kirstein in January 1959, and he spoke about "key characters of feminine distinction" for her to dance. He thought about an interpretation of Alice's Adventures in Wonderland, which Kirstein believed to carry the "essence of Martha's spirit." Graham, unable to respond to this but still interested in the collaboration, suggested Mary, Queen of Scots instead. Graham dancer Linda Hodes recalled that Graham was hesitant about accepting the commission, but believed it was due to Graham's rejection of ballet traditions. The title, Episodes, came from Tchelitchew's pitch.

Though the ballet is conceived as a collaboration, the two choreographers mostly worked on their parts separately. Graham said, "Collaboration was really not the term." Graham was set to choreograph the long opening and closing of the ballet, with Balanchine choreographing the rest. However, this plan "did not work out practically of theatrically," according to Graham. The two choreographed the two halves of the ballet instead, Episodes I by Graham and Episodes II by Balanchine. Initially, Graham was to choreograph on her dancers then teach the ballet to NYCB dancers. However, after Balanchine attended a Graham rehearsal, they clashed over what she had choreographed, with many instances of dancers on their knees and floorwork. It was then decided that the two choreographers would primarily work with their respective companies, while at Kirstein's suggestion, incorporate each other's dancers in their halves. (Note: There are conflicting accounts over whether Graham deliberately avoided working with NYCB dancers. Don McDonagh's biography stated that Graham raised her objection to the plan by using "all of the virtuosic skills inherent in the Graham technique, which would be exceptionally difficult for a classically trained ballet dancer," that would be impossible for NYCB dancers to master in a short amount of time, forcing the plan to be abandoned. However, another Graham biographer, Ernestine Stodelle, wrote an account of Graham shutting herself in her studio, listening to the music day after day, "even though at the time she had no idea of dancing the role of the Scottish Queen with her company, believing one of the NYCB dancers would perform it." Kane was more persuaded by Stodelle's account, due to an interview Graham gave to The Ballet Annual 1960, and Kane's own interview with Hodes, that both confirmed that account. Kane additionally noted that Stodelle interviewed four dancers involved in the development of Episodes in addition to Graham, while McDonagh's only interviewee involved in the ballet was Graham.)

The project was officially announced in late March, as part of NYCB's spring season that year. Cecil Beaton was first announced to be the designer of Graham's costumes, but NYCB costumer Karinska ultimately "designed and executed" costumes for the entire ballet, as credited in the program. David Hays designed the set and lighting. The legal contract for the co-production, signed less than a month before the premiere, stated Ballet Society owned "all rights to the use of the title" and exclusive rights to Graham's choreography for three years.

In the lead-up to the premiere, the ballet drew significant media attention and was described as "historic", due to contributions from leading choreographers of two different genres of dance. Walter Terry wrote in the New York Herald Tribune, "whether it turns out to be a success or only a fascinating experiment is of historical significance." The London-based Dance and Dancers reported, "news of historical importance to the international dance field has been made."

=== Graham ===
Graham was first assigned the score Passacaglia, op. 1. To understand it, she stayed in her studio and "played it and moved to it day after day after day", occasionally calling a principal dancer in for private work, before she began working with the full company. She studied Stefan Zweig and Raymond Preston's biographies on Mary, and was inspired by two poets, T. S. Eliot, whose poem East Coker referenced Mary, and Rainer Maria Rilke, who was Webern's favorite poet. Graham said she "found my articulation" from the two. Later, Graham realized she needed more music, so Balanchine gave her Six Pieces, op. 6, which he had already begun choreographing.

Graham also starred as Mary, with a stand-in in rehearsals. Early in the creation process, she expected an NYCB dancer to perform the role. Four NYCB dancers appeared alongside the Graham company, including Sallie Wilson, who originated the role of Elizabeth I, as well Kenneth Peterson, Bill Carter and Paul Nickel, who had smaller roles in the ballet. Graham did not want to partner an NYCB dancer and cast Bertram Ross as Bothwell. Wilson recalled that in rehearsals, Graham would stop rehearsals and let everyone meditate. Graham also explained the symbols in the choreography, "each thing was weighted carefully." Graham initially gave Wilson ballet steps, despite knowing little about them. Wilson then asked Graham to give her modern dance steps. Though Graham was glad about this request, she remained unsure whether Wilson could dance it, and other dancers assisted Wilson. She said the result of her dancing in the manner of Graham was "marvelous." She added that the Graham dancers "were thrilled that I could actually move my back – they had expected a ramrod." Graham created two versions of choreography for Wilson, one performed in the ballet's initial run in spring 1959, which Wilson thought was "less interesting", and another performed later that year, described as "much more in [Graham's] style, when she realized I could do more."

Previously, Graham only worked with her own dancers and followed her own schedule. However, for Episodes, she did not have ultimate control over all elements. Instead, she had to follow Balanchine's concept and the NYCB mode of working, where multiple choreographers share rehearsal schedules. She also clashed with Kirstein numerous times, especially regarding the designs of the ballet. NYCB was under union regulations and all costumes and sets must be made under legal contracts and at union shops, but Graham attempted to circumvent this. Graham was more cordial with Balanchine, and found him "so wonderful to work with, considerate and concerned – a joy to be with."

=== Balanchine ===
Only one Graham dancer worked with Balanchine, Paul Taylor. Taylor had some background in ballet, as he regularly took classes taught by Cecchetti disciple Margaret Craske during the 1950s. Kirstein, keen to work with Taylor, had previously invited Taylor to work on two projects, one as a choreographer and one as a dancer, but neither came into fruition. Balanchine was suffering from arthritis, and had difficulties demonstrating the steps to Taylor. Taylor, who originated a long solo, found Balanchine's process "a complete switch" from Graham, "The speed and craft in which he works are astounding, the rehearsal time being used economically, none if it taken up by explanations of concepts, poetic imagery, or motivation." Taylor was used to dancing Graham's plot-driven choreography, and initially struggled with Balanchine's more abstract concept. He also found the musicality and movement vocabulary to be more challenging than Graham's choreography. Fearing he would forget the complex choreography, Taylor would go home immediately after each rehearsal to draw stick figures and write notes for himself.

Prior to giving Six Pieces, op. 6 to Graham, Balanchine had spent four days choreographing to the score as a pas de deux for Diana Adams and Jacques d'Amboise, and nearly completed the pas de deux when Graham asked for more music. According to d'Amboise, Balanchine's vision of the pas de deux was "[a] version of first man and first woman," like Adam and Eve right after they ate the apple. Balanchine then made another pas de deux for Adams and d'Amboise, to Five Pieces, op. 10, and abandoned his original vision.

== Original cast ==
Roles / sections	Principal dancers
Episodes I
Mary, Queen of Scots	Martha Graham
Bothwell	Bertram Ross
Elizabeth, Queen of England	Sallie Wilson
The Four Marys	Helen McGehee, Ethel Winter, Linda Hodes, Akiko Kanda
Darnley	Gene McDonald
Riccio	Richard Kuch
Chastelard	Dan Wagoner
The Executer	Kenneth Peterson
2 Heralds	Bill Carter, Paul Nickel
Episodes II
Symphony, op. 21	Violette Verdy, Jonathan Watts
Five Pieces, op. 10	Diana Adams, Jacques d'Amboise
Concerto, op. 24	Allegra Kent, Nicholas Magallanes
Variations, op. 30	Paul Taylor
Ricercata	Melissa Hayden, Francisco Moncion

== Premiere and reception ==
Episodes premiered on May 14, 1959, at the City Center of Music and Dance, during NYCB's spring season. By popular demand, the season was extended for more performances of Episodes.

Times noted, "Vastly different in their approaches, both Balanchine and Graham were remarkably successful at illuminating Webern's sparse, mostly atonal scores—perhaps the world's unlikeliest music for dancing."

New York Times dance critic John Martin called the ballet "a truly remarkable creation." He commented on Graham's choreography, "the invention is superb and uncannily revelatory." As for Balanchine, Martin wrote, "The style in which he worked is a miracle of creativeness, far beyond anything he has done previously."

In another review published at the end of Episodes first season, Martin wrote, "What [Graham] has done is powerful, brilliant and well within the established conventions of her highly personal medium. Balanchine, on the other hand, has pushed his own equally characteristic approach into uncharted fields." Dance historian Angela Kane, however, found that some of the New York critics expressed their preference for Graham's contribution over Balanchine's.

== Subsequent performances ==
Graham's biographer Don McDonagh stated Graham soon lost interest in the ballet after the premiere. The Graham company and NYCB performed Episodes together again during NYCB's 1959 winter season, which was the last time Episodes was performed in full. Starting in 1960, the Balanchine choreography is presented as a standalone piece, at the time under the title Episodes II. Taylor appeared at the New York City Ballet for two more seasons as a guest artist to dance his solo. In 1961, Taylor's part in the ballet was removed. He was invited to join NYCB, but chose to focus on his choreographic career and his company instead. Henceforth, the Balanchine ballet is presented as simply Episodes. Other ballet companies that had performed Balanchine's Episodes include Dutch National Ballet, Scottish Ballet, Berlin Opera Ballet, National Ballet of Canada, Boston Ballet, Miami City Ballet, Suzanne Farrell Ballet and Les Grands Ballets Canadiens.

NYCB had never danced Graham's choreography, though Kirstein did consider it as early as May 1959, potentially with Melissa Hayden taking over as Mary. In 1965, Balanchine suggested Graham to have both companies revive both parts of the ballet for NYCB's fall season. She declined due to a scheduling conflict with her company, but she was open to such revival, "I hope your invitation will stand and that it can still take place at a time when we are not burdened as at present." Balanchine wrote in his 1977 book Balanchine's Complete Stories of the Great Ballets, "Miss Graham's part of Episodes has unfortunately not been seen for some years. It is our hope that one day it will be danced again." Kane speculated that the main reason why the complete Episodes co-production was never revived again was the "choreographic contradictions between the two parts", in addition to "conflicting company politics, working practices and performance schedules."

In 1980, the Graham company revived her Episodes at the Metropolitan Opera House, with the choreography significantly revised. Though the NYCB allowed Graham to use the original costumes by Karinska, her company used new costumes by Halston, while also using the original set by David Hays. This remains the only revival of Graham's Episodes.

=== Paul Taylor's solo ===
After Taylor's solo was cut from the ballet in 1961, he offered to teach it to whomever Balanchine chose, though Balanchine never took up this offer. It was not performed until 1986, three years after Balanchine's death, when Taylor reconstructed it for Peter Frame, then a soloist at the NYCB. Taylor cast Frame after spotting him at a company class, which Taylor was invited to observe by co-ballet master in chief Peter Martins. (Note: Ib Andersen was also chosen but dropped out due to an injury.) As Taylor's performance had never been filmed or notated, he relied on his notes and photographs to teach the solo to Frame. Taylor removed knee works that would be dangerous to Frame's ballet-trained body. Frame continued to perform the solo until 1989, a year before his retirement.

In 2014, when the Miami City Ballet performed Episodes, Taylor's solo was included. Frame taught the solo to the company's dancers, based on an archival video of him dancing the solo in 1989, though he did not let the dancers watch the video, and only showed them photographs of Taylor. Jovani Furlan danced it on opening night.

In 2020, NYCB performed the solo again. It was alternated between Furlan, who had since joined NYCB, and Michael Trusnovec, a former Paul Taylor Dance Company member who performed as a guest artist. As both Taylor and Frame died in 2018, Furlan taught the solo to Trusnovec. The two watched videos of Frame dancing the solo in both 1986 and 1989, and found significant differences on the choreography between the two videos. Believing that the 1986 version is closer to the original, they restored some steps back to the solo. NYCB excluded the solo from the ballet again in 2022.

== Notes and references ==
=== Sources ===
- Balanchine, George; Mason, Francis (1977). Balanchine's Complete Stories of the Great Ballets. Doubleday. ISBN 9780385113816.
- Buckle, Richard (1988). George Balanchine: Ballet Master : a Biography. Hamish Hamilton. ISBN 9780241121801.
- Kane, Angela (2007). ""Episodes" (1959): Entente Cordiale?". Dance Research: The Journal of the Society for Dance Research. 25 (1): 4–25. doi:10.3366/dar.2007.0020. S2CID 194106172.
- McDonagh, Don (1974). Martha Graham: a biography. David & Charles. ISBN 9780715367162.
- Reynolds, Nancy (1977). Repertory in Review: 40 Years of the New York City Ballet. Dial Press. ISBN 9780803773684.
- Stodelle, Ernestine (1984). Deep Song: The Dance Story of Martha Graham. Schirmer Books. ISBN 9780028725208.
- Taylor, Paul (1999). Private Domain: An Autobiography. University of Pittsburgh Press. ISBN 9780822956990.
- Tracy, Robert (1997). Goddess: Martha Graham's Dancers Remember. Limelight Editions. ISBN 9780879100865.
