= A Day in the Life (TV series) =

2010s American documentary web series

- Genre: Documentary
- Directed by: Morgan Spurlock
- Country of origin: United States
- Original language: English
- No. of seasons: 2
- No. of episodes: 16

Production
- Producer: Warrior Poets
- Running time: 21–28 minutes

Original release
- Network: Hulu
- Release: September 29, 2011 – January 11, 2013

A Day in the Life is a documentary television series, distributed by Hulu as its first original long-form programming venture. The first season includes six episodes starring Morgan Spurlock, whose production company, Warrior Poets, produced the show.

== Production ==
Spurlock produced the show with his production partner, Jeremy Chilnick, through Spurlock's production company, Warrior Poets. Each episode follows a notable person around for 24 hours. The series is distributed by Hulu, which had ventured into short-form web television original content.

The show marks the beginning of what Business Wire describes as a new Hulu initiative to "support creatively and financially the work of independent storytellers". The Huffington Post describes the original programming effort as an opportunity to open the chapter that "sets Hulu on a course of semi-independence, where it can produce shows outside of its parent companies". Previously, Hulu had been known for making repeats of existing content available, primarily from Disney, News Corp, and Comcast.

The original episodes aired on both the free Hulu service and the Hulu Plus subscription service every Wednesday for six weeks, beginning August 17, 2011. The first season featured Richard Branson, will.i.am, Russell Peters, Gregg Gillis (better known as Girl Talk), and Misty Copeland. The series premiere episode featured Branson.

== Episodes ==
Season	Episodes	Originally released	
Season	Episodes	First released	Last released
1	6	September 29, 2011	November 24, 2011
2	10	September 28, 2012	January 11, 2013

=== Season 1 (2011) ===
No. overall	No. in season	Title	Original release date
1	1	"Richard Branson"	September 29, 2011
The British Billionaire, launches Virgin America and receives a pitch from Adrian Grenier for shft.com.
2	2	"Russell Peters"	October 6, 2011
Laugh with stand-up comedian Russell Peters as we experience a day with him on the New Majority tour.
3	3	"will.i.am"	November 3, 2011
He visits Paris to inspires kids, works with a fashion designer, and plays with the Black Eyed Peas at the Stade de France.
4	4	"Girl Talk"	November 10, 2011
Hang with electronic musician Girl Talk as he performs at an outdoor music festival.
5	5	"Misty Copeland"	November 17, 2011
Watch the beautiful and talented Misty Copeland inspire young dancers at the Boys and Girls Club in the Bronx, as well as collaborate with a choreographer at the Dance Theatre of Harlem.
6	6	"Mr. Brainwash"	November 24, 2011
Follow street artist Mr. Brainwash as he uses the city as his own personal canvas.

=== Season 2 (2012-13) ===
No. overall	No. in season	Title	Original release date
7	1	"Marc Maron"	September 28, 2012
Experience a day in the life of comedian and podcaster Marc Maron.
8	2	"Jason "Mayhem" Miller"	October 5, 2012
Spend a day in the life of UFC fighter Jason "Mayhem" Miller.
9	3	"Mario Batali"	October 12, 2012
Experience a day in the life of culinary superstar Mario Batali.
10	4	"Stephanie Izard"	November 2, 2012
Join Top Chef winner and restaurateur Stephanie Izard as she takes us through a day in the life of a working class chef doing it her own way.
11	5	"Joel McHale"	November 9, 2012
See a day in the life of The Soup host and Community cast member Joel McHale.
12	6	"Das Racist"	November 30, 2012
Join indie rap sensation Das Racist as they take us through the day before their big performance with Philip Glass at the Tibet House Benefit Concert.
13	7	"Tim Ferriss"	December 7, 2012
Experience a day in the life of Tim Ferriss, entrepreneur and author of "The 4-Hour Workweek."
14	8	"YACHT"	December 14, 2012
Join indie pop duo YACHT as they return home to Portland for a special concert.
15	9	"John Fetterman"	January 4, 2013
Join John Fetterman, "America's Coolest Mayor," as he fights to make a difference for the families of Braddock, PA.
16	10	"?uestlove"	January 11, 2013
Join musician and producer ?uestlove as he faces some new opportunities and challenges.

== DVD Releases ==
Virgil Films and Entertainment released A Day in the Life Season 1 & 2 onto DVD with all 16 episodes of both seasons on a 2-disc set on October 8, 2013.
