= Sandra Noll Hammond =

American historian (1935–2025)

Sandra Noll Hammond (December 21, 1935 – September 13, 2025) was an American dancer, teacher, dance historian and educator. Internationally recognized for her studies of the development of ballet technique and training from the eighteenth through the twentieth centuries, she was the author of two books on ballet technique and of numerous published articles, lectures, and papers presented at dance workshops and scholarly conferences.

== Early life, education, and training ==
Sandra Sue Noll was born in Shawnee, Oklahoma, and raised in Fayetteville, Arkansas, where her parents moved when she was five years old. She began her theatrical training at an early age in classes for ballet, tap dancing, and drama at the Sue Keller Studio. Her ballet teachers there included Keller's daughter, Toby Keller Jorgensen, as well as a changing roster of dancers trained in Balanchine technique at the School of American Ballet in New York City. Noll continued her training at the Keller Studio until her sophomore year at the University of Arkansas. She was befriended during her college years by Eleanor King, a pioneer of modern dance who was an artist in residence at the university. In 1956, encouraged by King and at her mother's urging, she found the courage to audition for entrance to the recently established Dance Division at the Juilliard School in New York, which offered an innovative curriculum that included both ballet and modern dance for all its students.

At Juilliard from 1956 to 1958, Noll was strongly influenced by the example of Martha Hill, modern dancer and founding director of the Dance Division. Among her modern dance teachers there were José Limón, whose company she had admired at a university performance in Arkansas, and Betty Jones, a legendary teacher and founding member of Limón's company. Her ballet teachers on the faculty, including Antony Tudor, Margaret Craske, and Alfredo Corvino, were even more important to her training. In 1957, at age twenty-one, Noll married Philip Hammond, a sociologist of religion, and acquired the surname by which she would become professionally known. She then continued her dance studies with Thalia Mara and Arthur Mahoney at the School of Ballet Repertory and with Tudor and Craske at the Metropolitan Opera Ballet School.

== Professional career ==
In New York City, Hammond performed with the William Hug Dance Company (1956–1959) and with the Ballet Repertory Dancers (1958-1960), directed by Mara and Mahoney. Following her husband's academic appointments, she then began moving about the country. She danced as a soloist and guest artist with the Connecticut Opera Company (1961–1964) and, in San Francisco, as a corps member of the Pacific Ballet (1964–1965), directed by Alan Howard. After a career hiatus of a few years, she moved to Tucson, Arizona, in 1971. There, she joined the Arizona Dance Theater, a touring company directed by Frances Smith Cohen, and remained with that group until 1978. Over the next two decades, she performed as a freelance artist, specializing in Baroque dance, early Romantic ballet, and other styles of historical dance. As a Baroque dance specialist, she performed nationally with early music ensembles and with historical dance pioneers Régine Astier and Angene Feves.

During these years, Hammond expanded her career as performer to include work as a ballet teacher, lecturer, and administrator in academic dance programs. At the University of Arizona, she was co-founder, with Cohen, of the dance major program and was a lecturer and teacher of courses in ballet technique, modern dance technique, dance history, and historical dance forms, from 1970 through 1978. An extended leave during that period allowed her to study sixteenth- through eighteenth-century dances with Alan Stark, a dance historian in Mexico City. Back in Tucson, as departmental director of dance, she also created choreography for student and faculty concerts, in which she sometimes performed, and she continued her ballet studies with Dolores Mitrovich, whose career in Italy had included ballet training with Rafael Grassi and Enrico Cecchetti.

Thereafter, having moved to California in 1979, Hammond was a visiting lecturer at the University of California, Santa Barbara, where she taught dance history and ballet technique and earned a Bachelor of Arts degree in liberal studies. Later, as visiting lecturer at the University of California, Los Angeles, she taught dance history, Baroque dance technique, and early nineteenth-century ballet technique and was the leader of a ballet history research seminar at the graduate level. In 1985, she moved again, to Hawai'i, where she won appointments as associate professor, full professor, and director of dance at the University of Hawai'i Manoa, in Honolulu. For the next ten years, she taught courses in ballet technique, dance history, and historical dance forms for undergraduates and a seminar in theory and criticism for graduate students.

== Related activities ==
Throughout her academic career, Hammond was a popular guest artist, lecturer, and workshop leader at numerous institutions and venues around the world. In California, besides appearances in Santa Barbara and Los Angeles, she was a featured presenter and performer at the San Francisco Conservatory of Music, Stanford University, the California State University at Long Beach, and Mills College in Oakland. An accomplished actress as well as a dancer, she sometimes recreated historical dance performances with narration by her Santa Barbara colleague Frank W.D. Ries. Her impersonation of Anna Pavlova in "Pavlova Gavotte" (1913), performed to Paul Lincke's song "Das Glŭhwūrmchen" (The Glow-Worm) in authentic costume, was an audience favorite. At the end, after leaving center stage, she would linger nearby, encouraging spectators to continue applauding, and then would demurely come out again, smiling sweetly, for yet one more gracious bow.

Elsewhere in the United States, Hammond gave lecture-demonstrations at Boston College, Boston Conservatory, Indiana University's School of Music, Jacksonville University in Florida, Goucher College in Maryland, and the Philadelphia Museum of Art. Internationally, she appeared in Copenhagen, Paris, London, Ghent, Toronto, Leuven, Sydney, Turku, Helsinki, Mexico City, and Mérida, Yucatán. She was a guest instructor and lecturer for the New York University–American Ballet Theatre graduate program in ballet pedagogy since its inception in 2009. Among the topics of her lectures and workshops were "Nineteenth-Century Ballet, Era of Ballet Classics: Exploring Some Myths of Ballet History" (1997), "In the Ballet Classroom with Edgar Degas" (2006), and "Following the Footprints of the Ballet Pas de Deux: Selected Examples from the Sixteenth to the Twentieth Centuries" (2011).

Hammond served the Society of Dance History Scholars both on the board of directors and on the editorial board, which oversees publication of the monograph series Studies in Dance History. She was the recipient of research grants from the University of Arizona, the University of Hawaii, and the National Endowment for the Humanities. In 1989, she received a presidential citation for meritorious teaching at the University of Hawaii; in 2000, she was a member of the planning committee for the International Early Dance Conference in Belgium. In 2009 she received a lifetime achievement award from the Council of Organized Researchers for Pedagogical Studies of Ballet (CORPS de Ballet) International. She was a member of the advisory board of "Dance Chronicle: Studies in Dance and Related Arts," the leading scholarly journal in the field.

== Personal life and death ==
Sandra Noll married Philip E. Hammond on August 23, 1957. As his academic career as a sociologist of religion took him to various universities, he and she moved to Connecticut, Wisconsin, Arizona, and California. After their divorce, she then married musician Armand King Russell, on January 2, 1993, in Honolulu, where she was teaching. Russell, a teacher of music theory and composition, enabled Hammond to continue to teach and to perform by arranging and recording music from the old manuscripts that she used in her research. In retirement, they lived in Santa Rosa, California.

Sandra Noll Hammond died on September 13, 2025, at the age of 89.

== Selected writings ==
=== Books ===
- Ballet Basics, revised & enlarged 5th edition. New York: McGraw-Hill Higher Education, 2003. Written for the adult beginner in 1974, this is a well-illustrated introduction to the fundamentals of ballet technique. Includes an extensive chapter on the history of ballet technique and training. Translated into Finnish (Helsinki: Art House Oy) and Korean (Seoul: Eumaksekye).
- Ballet: Beyond the basics. Palo Alto, Calif.: Mayfield Publishing, 1982. Reissued by Waveland Press (Long Grove, Ill.) in 2010.

=== Articles and essays ===
- "The Internal Logic of Dance: A Weberian Perspective on the History of Ballet." With Philip E. Hammond as coauthor. Journal of Social History 12.4 (1979), 591–608.
- "Clues to Ballet's Technical History from the Early Nineteenth-Century Ballet Lesson." Dance Research (London) 3.1 (1984), 53–66.
- "Searching for the Sylph: Documentation of Early Developments in Pointe Technique." Dance Research Journal 19.2 (1988), 27–31.
- "Technique and Autonomy in the Development of Art: A Case Study in Ballet." With Philip E. Hammond as coauthor. Dance Research Journal 21.2 (1989), 15–24.
- "Introduction," to reissued of Letters on Dancing, reducing this elegant and healthful exercise to easy scientific principles, by E.A. Théleur (London, 1831). Studies in Dance History, a monograph series, vol. 2, no. 1 (Society of Dance History Scholars, 1990).
- "A Nineteenth-Century Dancing Master at the Court of Württemberg: The Dance Notebooks of Michel Saint-Léon." Dance Chronicle 15.3 (1992), 291–313.
- "Steps through Time: Selected Dance Vocabulary of the Eighteenth and Nineteenth Centuries." Dance Research (London) 10.2 (1992), 93–108.
- "Ballet Technique, History of: French Court Dance," "Technical Manuals: Publications, 1765-1859," and other articles on ballet in International Encyclopedia of Dance, 6 vols., edited by Selma Jeanne Cohen and others. New York: Oxford University Press, 1998.
- "Théleur, E.A." and "Théleur, chirography (London, 1831)," in Dictionnaire de la Danse. Paris; Larousse-Bordas, 1999.
- "Dances Related to Theatrical Dance Traditions" and "T.B.'s Technical Terminology: An Index," in The Extraordinary Dance Book T.B. 1826: An Anonymous Manuscript in Facsimile. Stuyvesant, N.Y.: Pendragon Press, 2000. Also includes introductory material by Elizabeth Aldrich and Armand Russell.
- "Sor and the Ballet of His Time," in Estudios sobre Fernando Sor, edited by Luis Gásser. Madrid: Instituto Complutense de Ciencias Musicales, 2003.
- "International Elements of Dance Training in the Late Eighteenth Century," in In Search of the Ballerino Grottesco: Gennaro Magri and His World, edited by Rebeca Harris-Warrick and Bruce Brown. Madison: University of Wisconsin Press, 2005.
- "The French Style and the Period." Dance Chronicle 29.3 (2006), 303–316. A lecture demonstration at the Bournonville Symposium in Copenhagen, 2005.
- "The Rise of Ballet Technique and Training: The Professionalization of an International Dance Form," in Kant, Marion, ed. (2007). The Cambridge Companion to Ballet. Cambridge Companions to Music. Cambridge and New York: Cambridge University Press. ISBN 978-0-521-53986-9.
- "In the Dance Classroom with Edgar Degas: Historical Perspectives on Ballet Techniqque," in Imagining Dance: Visual Representations of Dancers and Dancing, edited by Barbara Sparti and Judy Van Zile. Hildensheim, German: Georg Ohms, 2011.
- "Dancing La Sylphide in 1832: Something Old or Something New?" in La Sylphide, Paris 1832 and Beyond, edited by Marian Smith. London: Dance Books, 2012.
- "Ballet Adieu," review of Apollo's angels: A History of Ballet, by Jennifer Homans. Dance Chronicle 33.2 (2012), 259–266.
- "In Memoriam: Angene Feves, 1937-2014." Dance Chronicle 37.3 (2014), 395–399.
