= Steven Melendez =

American classical dancer (born 1986)

- Born: 1986 (age 39–40); Bronx, New York
- Occupation: Ballet dancer
- Career
- Current group: New York Theatre Ballet
- Website: www.stevenmelendez.com

Steven Melendez is an American classical dancer. He is a principal artist with the New York Theatre Ballet and the company's Artistic Director. Formerly, he was a principal artist with the Estonian National Ballet and a soloist with Ballet Concierto in Buenos Aires, Argentina.

== Early life ==
Born in the Bronx, New York City, Melendez began his ballet training at Ballet School New York at the age of 7, when he was rescued from a New York City homeless shelter and enrolled in New York Theatre Ballet's Project LIFT. He is also a graduate of the Jacqueline Kennedy Onassis School at American Ballet Theatre

== Career ==
Melendez has performed internationally in works by Antony Tudor, José Limón, Agnes deMille, George Balanchine, Sallie Wilson, Frederick Ashton and Richard Alston. In 2011 Melendez performed in the premiere of Alston's work A Rugged Flourish. In 2008 Melendez premiered Uinuv Kaunitar by Swedish choreographer Pär Isberg at the Vanemuine Theater.

Melendez was a 2012 Clive Barnes Award nominee and was a finalist at the 5th Rudolf Nureyev International Ballet Competition in Budapest, Hungary. In 2013 Melendez spoke on the "Dancing Through Life, Living Through Dance" symposium as an alumnus of the Professional Children's School Melendez performed with The Men Dancers: From the Horse’s Mouth at the 2012 Jacob's Pillow Dance Festival in honor of Ted Shawn.

In 2022, Melendez and the LIFT program were featured in the documentary Lift, which premiered at the Tribeca Festival.
