= Nora Kimball =

American ballerina and teacher

Nora Koito Kimball-Mentzos or simply Nora Kimball is a ballet teacher and former American ballerina, who is often overlooked for being one of the first African American female soloists—the second -- [at American Ballet Theatre (ABT). She danced with the ABT in the mid-1980s and as an African American who is also Asian American, preceded Misty Copeland, who is often credited as the first. ABT has been described as one of the three great American-style classical ballet companies on the world stage today (along with New York City Ballet and San Francisco Ballet).

Kimball trained in New York City at the National Academy of Ballet before attending The Harkness House for Ballet Arts. Studied further at The American Ballet Theatre School. Kimball has been a soloist with the Nederlands Dans Theater and the Frankfurt Ballet. She has also worked with Eliot Feld Ballet, the Stuttgart Ballett, Karole Armitage and Peter Sellars. She had moved to the Frankfurt Ballet by 1991. She has worked with William Forsythe. She continues to work in Frankfurt teaching for the Zena Rommett Floor Barre Technique TM since 2001 and the Dancedepartment of the Hochschule für Musik und Darstellende Kunst.

== Notable performances ==
At ABT Clark Tippet made his first ballet, Enough Said, on Kimball, the rest of the cast being Robert Hill, Gabrielle Brown, Lucette Katerndahl, Kathleen Moore, Ethan Brown, John Gardner and Ross Yearsley.

Kimball starred in Peter Sellars' revival of The Seven Deadly Sins with music and lyrics by Kurt Weill and Bertolt Brecht in their final operatic collaboration (the original choreography by Balanchine goes uncredited here.) Kent Nagano conducts the orchestra of the Opéra National de Lyon for this performance. Of the twelve scenes on the DVD, the first nine of which are choreographed, Kimball is credited on four.

Although the production was filmed in 1993, the 47 minute work was not released until June 10, 2003, and intercuts footage from performances in Memphis, Los Angeles, Philadelphia, Boston, Baltimore, and San Francisco. Sellars' direction is widely criticized.

She was one of three solo dancers in El Niño, an opera-oratorio by the American composer John Adams, during its premiers in December 2000 in Paris and January 2001 in San Francisco. Both premiers were under the stage direction of Peter Sellars and musical direction of Kent Nagano.

Kimball also appeared in David Gordon's 1987 production, Made in U.S.A., which starred Mikhail Baryshnikov. The show included three ballets entitled Valda and Misha, TV Nine Lives, and Murder; Valda and Misha was commissioned for the telecast.
