= Lift (2022 film) =

2022 documentary film

Lift is a 2022 documentary film directed by David Petersen and produced by Petersen and Mary Recine. Misty Copeland served as principal advisor and as one of the executive producers.

The film follows homeless and at-risk children in New York Theatre Ballet's LIFT program, which provides them dance training and tutoring. Juxtaposed with the children is the program's new director Steven Melendez, an alumnus of the program himself, who returns to the homeless shelter he lived in as a child to recruit participants as part of his new role.

== Production and release ==
The film includes footage captured over almost 11 years. Initially inspired by a conversation with a photographer who had worked with the New York Theater Ballet (NYTB), Petersen began filming without a budget, a plan, or staff; students from a class he taught at New York University joined him for audio capture. He spent the decade filming 35 of the students, while the final cut narrowed the focus to three – Yolassie, Sharia, and Victor Abreu, who would become a soloist for the New York City Ballet in 2025, three years after the film's premiere.

Advisors for the film include Misty Copeland (as principal advisor) and Lourdes Lopez.

== Release and reception ==
The film premiered at the Tribeca Festival in 2022. Paramount acquired the film for distribution.

The film has been reviewed in The New York Times, and Petersen and Melendez gave an interview to WNYC.
