= A Ballerina's Tale =

- Theatrical release poster
- Directed by: Nelson George
- Produced by: Leslie Norville; Nelson George
- Narrated by: Misty Copeland
- Cinematography: Cliff Charles; Oskar Landi; Nelson George; Malika Weeden; Nicolas Waterman; Jon Dunham
- Edited by: Malika Weeden
- Music by: Chloe Flower; Drew Vella
- Production companies: Urban Romances, Inc.
- Distributed by: Sundance Selects
- Release dates: April 19, 2015 (Tribeca Film Festival); October 14, 2015 (United States)
- Running time: 85 minutes
- Country: United States
- Language: English
- Box office: $125,144 (USA)

A Ballerina's Tale is a 2015 documentary film revolving around the career of Misty Copeland, who serves as the narrator of the film as well as its subject. The film premiered on April 19, 2015, at the Tribeca Film Festival. It was released through video on demand on October 13, 2015, prior to opening in a limited release on October 14, 2015, by Sundance Selects. A version of it, which is available on the PBS website, was also aired by PBS stations beginning in February 2016. The film received mostly positive reviews.

== Synopsis ==
The film follows the daily life of Copeland with emphasis on her role as one of the first African-American female soloists to present what Mekado Murphy of The New York Times describes as the process of the dancer. The film begins with archival footage of a young Copeland at a small ballet studio and focuses on her cultural impact and professional ascension, despite injuries and other challenges, without delving into her personal history.

== Development ==
On September 20, 2013, Nelson George announced a $40,000 Kickstarter campaign to fund production of a documentary film about the life of Misty Copeland. The campaign raised US$54,251 with 657 backers. Prince contributed a "substantial sum" to the campaign. The film is one of several forms of media publicity surrounding Copeland who has become a trailblazing ballerina with the American Ballet Theatre.

== Release ==
The film premiered at the Tribeca Film Festival on April 19, 2015, accompanied by a ballet performance. Copeland, who narrates the film, spoke following its premiere. Sundance Selects acquired the US distribution rights to the film. The film was released through video on demand on October 13, 2015, and the following day began a limited release in US cinemas. A 55-minute version of it aired beginning on February 8, 2016, as part of PBS' Independent Lens series.

== Critical response ==
A Ballerina's Tale received mostly positive reviews. It holds a 73% Fresh rating on the website Rotten Tomatoes, based on 11 reviews with an average rating of 7.8/10. It holds a 57 score on Metacritic based on 4 reviews.

Maya Chung for NBCnews.com wrote: "A Ballerina's Tale is one film that is making that impact. The documentary gives an in-depth picture of Copeland's struggles with being black in a predominantly white Ballet world and it chronicles her experience recovering from a leg fracture - one that could've stopped her dream of becoming a principal dancer." Amy Brady from The Village Voice commented: "In A Ballerina's Tale, director Nelson George paints a moving portrait of Copeland that underscores her triumphs over bodily and historical limitations. ... The film is structured around mid-career highlights – Copeland's solo performance in The Firebird at the Metropolitan Opera House, her career-defining role as Odette/Odile in Swan Lake – but it reminds us that her rise to stardom was marked by self-doubt and a need for mentorship."

The film is not considered "eye-opening" according to Louise Blouin Media's Regina Mogilevskaya, but the presentation of Copeland as a performer is what makes the film memorable.
