= Misty Copeland =

American ballet dancer and author (born 1982)

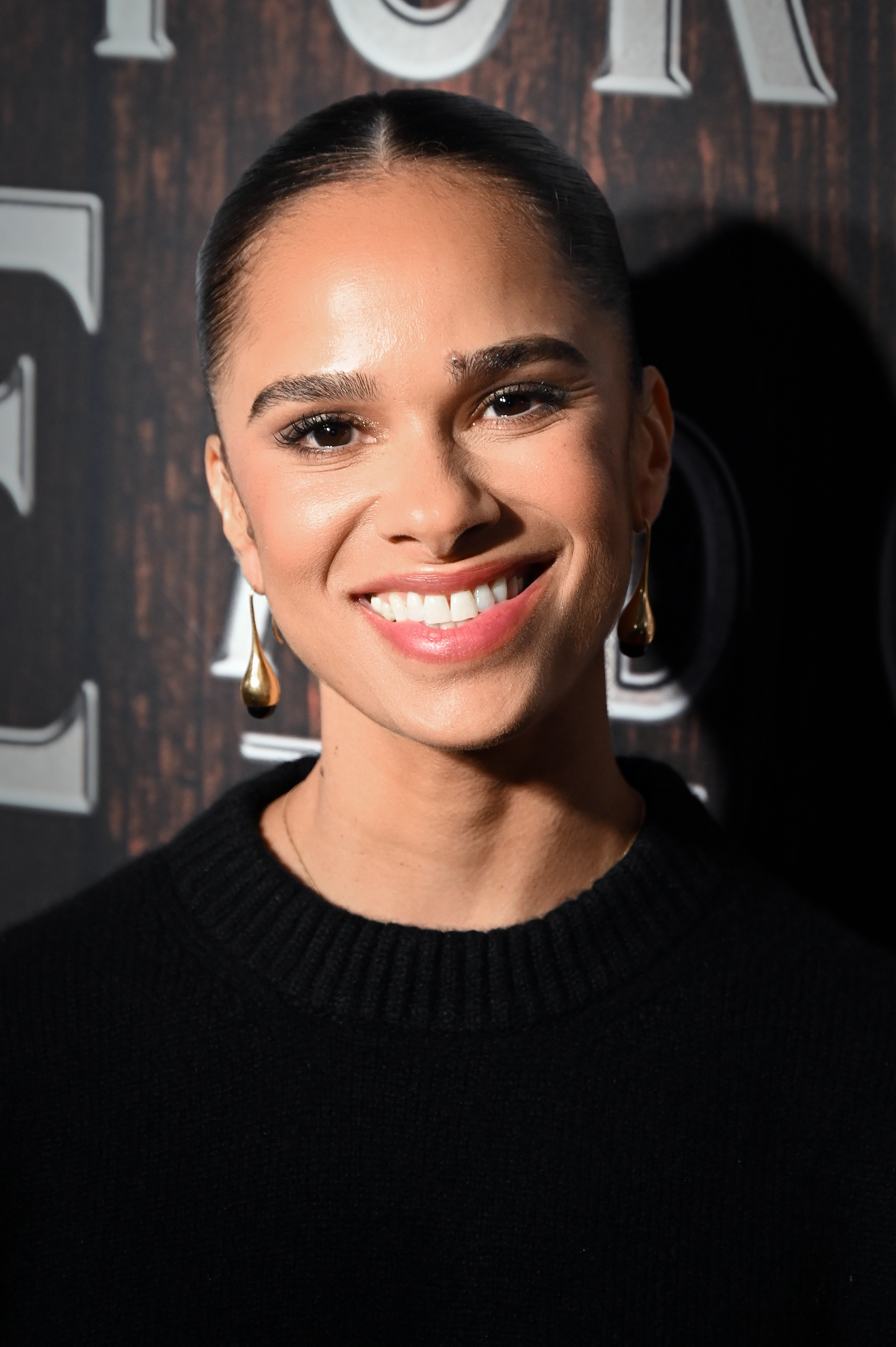
- Copeland in 2026
- Born: Misty Danielle Copeland; September 10, 1982 (age 44); Kansas City, Missouri, U.S.
- Occupations: Ballet dancer, author
- Years active: 1995–present
- Spouse: Olu Evans (m. 2016)
- Children: 1
- Relatives: Taye Diggs (cousin-in-law)
- Website: mistycopeland.com

Misty Danielle Copeland (born September 10, 1982) is an American ballet dancer and author. She has danced primarily for American Ballet Theatre (ABT), one of the three leading classical ballet companies in the United States. On June 30, 2015, Copeland became the first African American woman to be promoted to principal dancer in ABT's 75-year history.

Copeland was considered a prodigy who rose to stardom despite not starting ballet until age 13. Two years later, in 1998, her ballet teachers were serving as her custodial and legal guardians, and her mother was fighting a custody battle against them. At the same time, Copeland – already an award-winning dancer – was receiving professional offers. The legal issues involved filings for emancipation by Copeland and restraining orders by her mother. Both sides dropped legal proceedings, and Copeland moved home to begin studying under a new teacher, who was a former ABT member.

In 1997, Copeland won the Los Angeles Music Center Spotlight Award as the best dancer in Southern California. After two summer workshops with ABT, she became a member of ABT's Studio Company in 2000, its corps de ballet in 2001, and an ABT soloist in 2007. As a soloist from 2007 to 2015, she was described as having matured into a more contemporary and sophisticated dancer. She retired from ABT in 2025.

In addition to her dance career, Copeland has become a public speaker, author, celebrity spokesperson and stage performer. She has written two autobiographical books and narrated a documentary about her career challenges, A Ballerina's Tale. In 2015, she was named one of the 100 most influential people in the world by Time magazine, appearing on its cover. She performed on Broadway in On the Town, toured as a featured dancer for Prince and appeared on the reality television shows A Day in the Life and So You Think You Can Dance. She has endorsed products and companies such as T-Mobile, Coach, Inc., Dr Pepper, Seiko, The Dannon Company and Under Armour.

== Early life ==
Copeland was born in Kansas City, Missouri, and raised in the San Pedro community of Los Angeles, California, the daughter of Sylvia DelaCerna and Doug Copeland. Her father is of German and African American descent, while her mother is of Italian and African American ancestry and was adopted by African American parents. She is the youngest of four children from her mother's second marriage and has two younger half-siblings, one from her mother's third marriage and one from her fourth. Copeland did not see her father between the ages of two and twenty-two. Her mother, a former Kansas City Chiefs cheerleader, had studied dance. She is a trained medical assistant, but worked mostly in sales.

Between the ages of three and seven, Copeland lived in Bellflower, California, with her mother and her mother's third husband, Harold Brown, a Santa Fe Railroad sales executive. The family moved to San Pedro, where Sylvia eventually married her fourth husband, radiologist Robert DelaCerna and where Misty attended Point Fermin Elementary School. When she was seven, Copeland saw the film Nadia on television and its subject Nadia Comăneci became her new role model. Copeland never studied ballet or gymnastics formally until her teenage years, but in her youth she enjoyed choreographing flips and dance moves to Mariah Carey songs. Following in the footsteps of her older sister Erica, Copeland became captain of San Pedro's Dana Middle School drill team, where her natural grace came to the attention of its classically trained coach, Elizabeth Cantine.

By 1994, Copeland's mother had separated from Robert. After she and her children lived with various friends and boyfriends, and were homeless at times, DelaCerna moved with her children into two small rooms at the Sunset Inn in Gardena, California where Copeland and her siblings slept on the couch or floor. In early 1996, Cantine convinced Copeland to attend a ballet class at her local Boys & Girls Club. Cynthia Bradley, a friend of Cantine's, taught a free ballet class at the club once a week. Copeland attended several classes as a spectator before participating. DelaCerna allowed Copeland to go to the club after school until the workday ended. Bradley invited Copeland to attend class at her small ballet school, San Pedro Dance Center. Copeland initially declined the offer, however, because her mother did not have a car, was working 12–14 hours a day, and her oldest sister Erica was working two jobs. Copeland began her ballet studies at the age of 13 at the San Pedro Dance Center when Cynthia Bradley began picking her up from school. After three months of study, Copeland was en pointe.

Her mother told Copeland that she would have to give up ballet, but Bradley wanted Copeland to continue and offered to host her. DelaCerna agreed to this, and Copeland moved in with Bradley and her family. Eventually, Copeland and DelaCerna signed a management contract and a life-story contract with Bradley. Copeland spent the weekdays with the Bradleys near the coast and the weekends at home with her mother, a two-hour bus ride away. Copeland would spend most of her next three years with the Bradleys. By the age of fourteen, Copeland was the winner of a national ballet contest and won her first solo role. The Bradleys introduced Copeland to books and videos about ballet. When she saw Paloma Herrera, a principal ballerina with ABT, perform at the Dorothy Chandler Pavilion, Copeland began to idolize her as much as she did Mariah Carey. The media first noticed her when she drew 2,000 patrons per show as she performed as Clara in The Nutcracker at the San Pedro High School after only eight months of study. She played a larger role as Kitri in Don Quixote at the San Pedro Dance Center and then performed with the L.A. Academy of Fine Arts in a featured role in The Chocolate Nutcracker, an African American version of the tale, narrated by Debbie Allen. The latter was presented at UCLA's Royce Hall. Copeland's role was modified especially for her, and included ethnic dances.

During this period, Copeland received far more personal attention from the Bradley family than her mother could give each of her six children. Raised in a lapsed Christian household, when Copeland lived with the Bradley family, she attended their synagogue and celebrated Shabbat with them, enjoying their family's closeness. In addition to Bradley's intensive ballet training, her husband, a modern-dance teacher, served as Copeland's pas-de-deux instructor and partner. The summer before her fifteenth birthday, Bradley began to homeschool Copeland for 10th grade to free up more time for dance. At fifteen years old, Copeland won first place in the Los Angeles Music Center Spotlight Awards at the Chandler Pavilion in March 1998. Copeland said it was the first time she ever battled nervousness. The winners received scholarships between $500 and $2500. Copeland's victory in the 10th annual contest among gifted high school students in Southern California secured her recognition by the Los Angeles Times as the best young dancer in the Greater Los Angeles Area.

Copeland attended the summer workshop at the San Francisco Ballet School in 1998. She and Bradley selected the workshop over offers from the Joffrey Ballet, ABT and Dance Theater of Harlem. Of the programs she auditioned for, only New York City Ballet declined to make her an offer. San Francisco Ballet, ABT and New York City Ballet are regarded as the three preeminent classical ballet companies in the US. During the six-week workshop at San Francisco, Copeland was placed in the most advanced classes and was under a full-tuition plus expenses scholarship. At the end of the workshop, she received one of the few offers to continue as a full-time student at the school. She declined the offer because of the encouragement from her mother to return home, the prospect of continuing personal training from the Bradley family and dreams of a subsequent summer with American Ballet Theatre.

== Custody battle ==
Copeland returned to her mother's home, where the two frequently argued. Her mother had long resented the Bradleys' influence and soon decided that Copeland would cease study with the Bradleys. Copeland was distraught with fear that she would not be able to dance. She had heard the term emancipation while in San Francisco; the procedure was common among young performers to secure their financial and residential independence. The Bradleys introduced Copeland to Steven Bartell, a lawyer who explained the emancipation petition process. The Bradleys encouraged her to be absent from home when the emancipation petition was delivered to her mother. Copeland ran away from home for three days and stayed with a dance friend, while Bartell filed the emancipation papers. After her mother reported Copeland missing, she was told about the emancipation petition. Three days after running away, Copeland was returned to her mother by the police. DelaCerna engaged lawyer Gloria Allred and applied for a series of restraining orders, which included the Bradleys' five-year-old son, who had been Copeland's roommate, and Bartell. The order was partly intended to preclude contact between the Bradleys and Copeland, but it did not have proper legal basis, since there had been no stalking and no harassment.

The custody controversy was highly publicized in the press (especially Los Angeles Times and Extra), starting in August and September 1998. Parts of the press coverage spilled over into op-ed articles. The case was heard in Torrance, in the Superior Court of Los Angeles County. DelaCerna claimed that the Bradleys had brainwashed Copeland into filing suit for emancipation from her mother, Allred claimed that the Bradleys had turned Copeland against her mother by belittling DelaCerna's intelligence. The Bradleys noted that the management contract gave them authority over her career, but they stated that they would wait until Copeland became eighteen before seeking twenty percent of Copeland's earnings.

The dismissal of the emancipation petition accomplished Sylvia's main goal of keeping the family bonds intact and strong, without interference by third parties. ... Another concern of Sylvia in filing a request for restraining orders was that she did not believe it was in Misty's best interest to have continuing contact with the Bradleys. In the sworn declarations filed by the Bradleys in response to the restraining order they said that "we have not and will never do anything to interfere with Misty's relationship with her mother." ... Since Sylvia has accomplished all of the goals that she intended to achieve when she filed her papers with the court we have chosen not to proceed to seek an injunction in this matter.

— Gloria Allred

After DelaCerna stated that she would always make sure Copeland could dance, both the emancipation papers and restraining orders were dropped. Copeland, who claimed she did not understand the term emancipation, withdrew the petition after informing the judge that such charges no longer represented her wishes. Still, DelaCerna wanted the Bradleys out of her daughter's life. Copeland re-enrolled at San Pedro High School for her junior year (1998–99), on pace to graduate with her original class of 2000. DelaCerna sought Cantine's advice on finding a new ballet school. Copeland began ballet study at Lauridsen Ballet Centre in Torrance with former ABT dancer Diane Lauridsen, although her dancing was now restricted to afternoons in deference to her schooling. Late in 1998, all parties appeared on Leeza Gibbons' talk show, Leeza, where Copeland sat silently as the adults "bickered shamelessly". As a student, Copeland had a 3.8/4.0 GPA through her junior year of high school. In 2000, DelaCerna stated that Copeland's earnings from ballet were set aside in a savings account and only used as needed.

== American Ballet Theatre ==
=== Early ABT career ===
Copeland auditioned for several dance programs in 1999, and each made her an offer to enroll in its summer program. She performed with ABT as part of its 1999 and 2000 Summer Intensive programs. By the end of the first summer, she was asked to join the ABT Studio Company. Her mother insisted that she finish high school, and so Copeland returned to California for her senior year, even though ABT arranged to pay for her performances, housing accommodations and academic arrangements. She studied at the Summer Intensive Program on full scholarship for both summers and was declared ABT's National Coca-Cola Scholar in 2000. In the 2000 Summer Intensive Program, she danced the role of Kitri in Don Quixote. Copeland's strongest memory from the summer is working with choreographer Twyla Tharp on Push Comes to Shove. Of the 150 dancers in the 2000 Summer Intensive Program, she was one of six selected to join the junior dance troupe.

In September 2000, she joined the ABT Studio Company, which is ABT's second company, and became a member of its Corps de ballet in 2001. As part of the Studio Company, she performed the Pas de Deux in Tchaikovsky's The Sleeping Beauty. Eight months after joining the company, she was sidelined for nearly a year by a lumbar stress fracture. When Copeland joined the company, she weighed 108 pounds (49.0 kg) (she is 5 feet 2 inches (1.57 m) tall). At age 19, her puberty had been delayed, a situation common in ballet dancers. After the lumbar fracture, her doctor told her that inducing puberty would help to strengthen her bones, and he prescribed birth control pills. Copeland recalls that in one month she gained 10 pounds, and her small breasts swelled to double D-cup size: "Leotards had to be altered for me ... to cover my cleavage, for instance. I hated this sign that I was different from the others. ... I became so self-conscious that, for the first time in my life, I couldn't dance strong. I was too busy trying to hide my breasts." Management noticed and called her in to talk about her body. The professional pressure to conform to conventional ballet aesthetics resulted in body image struggles and a binge eating disorder. Copeland says that, over the next year, new friendships outside of ABT, including with Victoria Rowell and with her boyfriend, Olu Evans (now her husband), helped her to regain confidence in her body. She explained, "My curves became an integral part of who I am as a dancer, not something I needed to lose to become one. I started dancing with confidence and joy, and soon the staff at ABT began giving me positive feedback again. And I think I changed everyone's mind about what a perfect dancer is supposed to look like." During her years in the corps, as the only black woman in the company, Copeland also felt the burden of her race in many ways and contemplated a variety of career choices. Recognizing that Copeland's isolation and self-doubt were standing in the way of her talent, ABT's artistic director, Kevin McKenzie, asked writer and arts figure Susan Fales-Hill, then vice-chair of ABT's board of directors, to mentor Copeland. Fales-Hill introduced Copeland to black women trailblazers who encouraged Copeland and helped her to gain perspective.

Early career reviews mentioned Copeland as more radiant than higher ranking dancers, and she was named to the 2003 class of Dance Magazine's "25 to Watch". In 2003, she was favorably reviewed for her roles as a member of the corps in La Bayadère and William Forsythe's workwithinwork. Recognition continued in 2004 for roles in ballets such as Raymonda, workwithinwork, Amazed in Burning Dreams, Sechs Tänze, Pillar of Fire, "Pretty Good Year", "VIII" and "Sinfonietta, where she "stood out in the pas de trois – whether she was gliding across the floor or in a full lift, she created the illusion of smoothness". She also danced the Hungarian Princess in Tchaikovsky's Swan Lake. The 2004 season is regarded as her breakthrough season. She was included in the 2004 picture book by former ABT dancer Rosalie O'Connor titled Getting Closer: A Dancer's Perspective. Also in 2004, she met her biological father for the first time and regretted that she had not done so sooner.

In 2005, her most notable performance was a pas de deux in George Balanchine's Tarantella. She also danced the Lead Polovtsian Girl in "Polovtsian Dances" from Prince Igor. In 2006, she was acknowledged for her meticulous classical performance style in Giselle and created a role in Jorma Elo's Glow–Stop. Elo said: "Misty has the capability to absorb something extremely fast and then reproduce it exactly, and she gives such clarity to the material. If I were to make my own company, she would be the first one I would call." That year, she also returned to Southern California to perform at Orange County Performing Arts Center and danced one of the cygnets and reprised her role as the Hungarian Princess in Swan Lake in New York. In both 2006 and 2007, Copeland danced the role of Blossom in James Kudelka's Cinderella. Copeland's "old-style" performance continued to earn her praise in 2007. In 2007, she danced the Fairy of Valor in The Sleeping Beauty. Other roles that Copeland played before she was appointed a soloist by ABT included Twyla Tharp roles in In the Upper Room and Sinatra Suite as well as a role in Mark Morris's Gong. A Dance Magazine feature stated that Copeland's "sublime rapport with her partners in ... Sinatra Suite has earned her the honor of dancing with the company's male superstars".

=== Soloist ===
Copeland was appointed a soloist at ABT in August 2007, one of the youngest ABT dancers promoted to soloist. Although she was described by early accounts as the first African American woman promoted to soloist for ABT, Anne Benna Sims and Nora Kimball were soloists with ABT in the 1980s. Male soloist Keith Lee also preceded her. As of 2008, Copeland was the only African-American woman in the dance company during her entire ABT career. The only male African American in the company during her career, Danny Tidwell, left in 2005. In an international ballet community with a lack of diversity, she was so unusual as an African American ballerina that she endured cultural isolation. She has been described in the press as the Jackie Robinson of classical ballet.

Copeland was a standout among her peers. In her first season as a soloist at New York City Center, in which avant-garde ballets works were performed, she received good notices in The New York Times for a Balanchine Ballo della Regina role. Also in 2007, she created a leading role in C. to C. (Close to Chuck), choreographed by Jorma Elo to A Musical Portrait of Chuck Close, Études 2, 9 & 10, by Philip Glass. Her performances of Tharp's works in the same season were recognized, and she was described as more sophisticated and contemporary as a soloist than she had been as a corps dancer. Her summer 2008 Metropolitan Opera House (the Met) season performances in Don Quixote and Sleeping Beauty were also well received.

During the 2008–09 season, Copeland was praised for performances in Twyla Tharp's Baker's Dozen and Paul Taylor's Company B. During the 2009 Spring ABT season at the Met, Copeland performed Gulnare in Le Corsaire and leading roles in Taylor's Airs and Balanchine's Pas de Deux from Swan Lake. Her 2008–09 Annenberg Fellowship included training for the Pas de Deux. Late that year, she performed in ABT's first trip to Beijing at the new National Center for the Performing Arts. In 2009, Copeland created a role in Aszure Barton's One of Three.

In 2010, after recovering from a stress fracture, Copeland performed in Birthday Offering at the Met and at the Guggenheim Museum danced to David Lang's music. She also created the Spanish Dance in ABT artist-in-residence Alexei Ratmansky's new version of The Nutcracker, premiered at the Brooklyn Academy of Music. In early 2011, she was well received at the Kennedy Center as the Milkmaid in Ratmansky's The Bright Stream, a remake of a banned comic ballet. In Black History Month in 2011, Copeland was selected by Essence as one of its 37 Boundary-breaking black women in entertainment. That same month, she toured with Company B, performed at Sadler's Wells Theatre in London. In May, she created a role in Ratmansky's Dumbarton, danced to Stravinsky's chamber concerto, Dumbarton Oaks. Alastair Macaulay of The New York Times found the piece too intimate for the cavernous Met, but he noted: "Misty Copeland gives sudden hints of need and emotional bleakness in a duet ... too much is going on to explain itself at one viewing; but at once I know I'm emotionally and structurally gripped." Her Summer 2011 ABT solos included the peasant pas de deux in Giselle and, in Ratmansky's The Bright Stream at the Met in June, her reprise of the Milkmaid was called "luminous, teasingly sensual". She reprised the Bright Stream role again in July at the Dorothy Chandler Pavilion in Los Angeles with a performance described as "sly". As a flower girl, she was described as glittering in Don Quixote. In August, she performed at the Vail International Dance Festival in the Gerald Ford Amphitheater in Vail, Colorado. In November, she danced in Taylor's Black Tuesday.

In 2012, Copeland began achieving solo roles in full-length standard repertory ballets rather than works that were mostly relatively modern pieces. A 2012 feature in Dance Magazine stated that Copeland's "classical repertoire ... has deepened in artistry with each season. In the peasant pas de deux from Giselle, she is buoyant and refreshingly lyrical, and her plush jumps in Swan Lake's pas de trois are a joy. As the Fairy of Valor in Sleeping Beauty, she tempers the harsh stabbing fingers and dagger-like pas de chats by uplifting her body with grandeur and, yes, valor." She starred in The Firebird, with choreography by Ratmansky at the Segerstrom Center for the Arts in Costa Mesa, California. It premiered on March 29, 2012. The performance was hailed by Laura Bleiberg in the Los Angeles Times as one of the year's best dance performances. That year, Copeland was recognized by The Council of Urban Professionals as their Breakthrough Leadership Award winner. She also danced the role of Gamzatti in La Bayadère at the Met to praise from Alastair Macaulay of The New York Times, who noted her "adult complexity and worldly allure". The Firebird was again performed at the Met in June 2012, with Copeland set to alternate in the lead. It was Copeland's first leading role at ABT. Backstage described it as her "most prestigious part" to date. After only one New York performance in the role, Copeland withdrew from the entire ABT season due to six stress fractures in her tibia. She was sidelined for seven months after her October surgery.

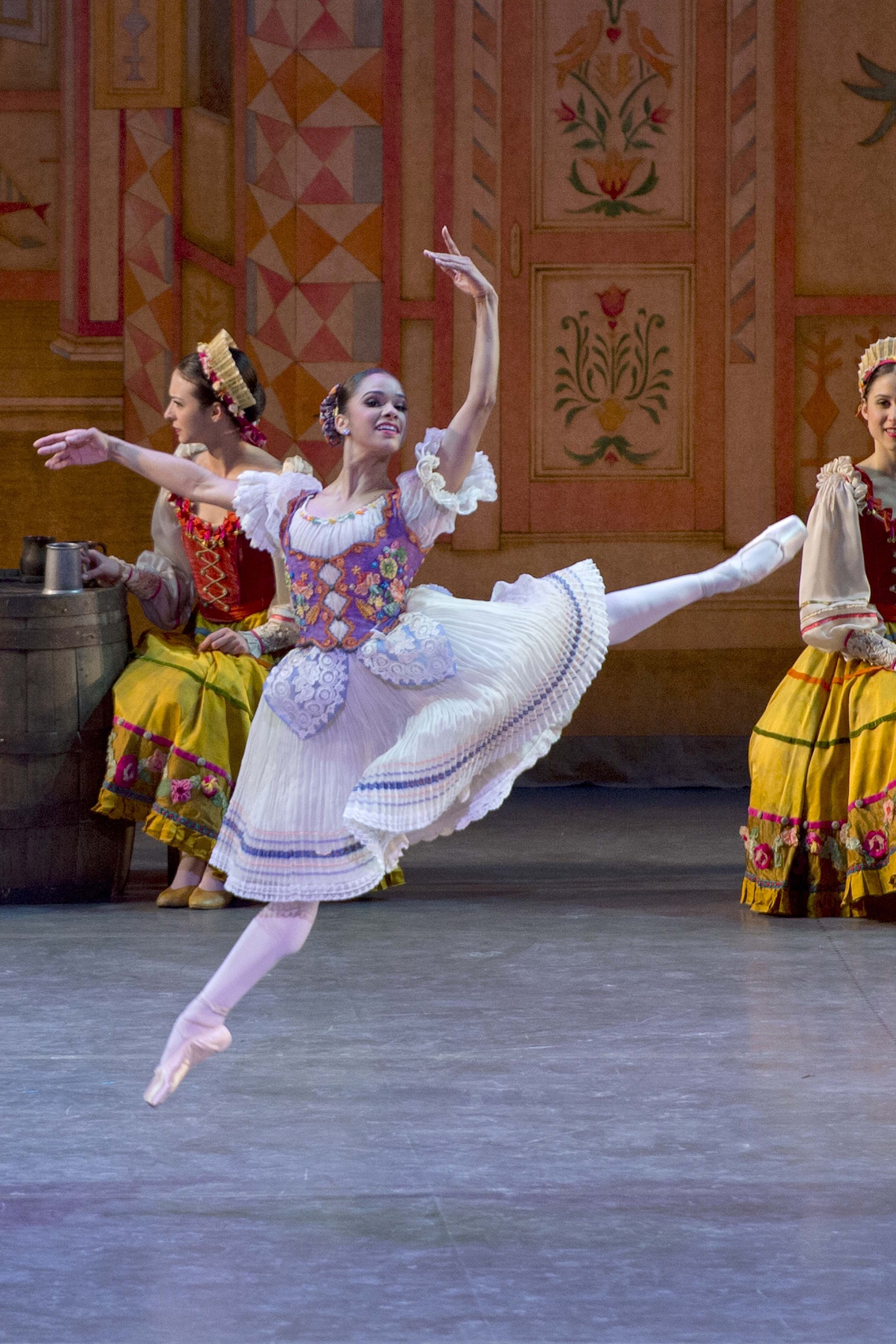
Copeland in Coppélia in 2014

Upon her return to the stage, she danced the Queen of the Dryads in Don Quixote in May 2013. Nelson George began filming a documentary about her comeback. Copeland reprised her role as Gulnare in June 2013 in the pirate-themed Le Corsaire. She also played an Odalisque in the same ballet. Later in the year, she danced in Tharp's choreography of Bach Partita for Violin No. 2 in D minor for solo violin, and as Columbine in ABT's revival of Ratmansky's Nutcracker at the Brooklyn Academy of Music.

In May 2014, Copeland performed the lead role of Swanilda in Coppélia at the Met. According to Los Angeles Times writer Jevon Phillips, she is the first African American woman to dance the role. The same month, she was praised in the dual role of Queen of the Dryads and Mercedes in Don Quixote by Brian Seibert of The New York Times, although Jerry Hochman of Critical Dance felt that she was not as impressive in the former role as in the latter. Later in May, the Met staged a program of one-act ballets consisting of Theme and Variations, Duo Concertant and Gaîté Parisienne, featuring Copeland in all three. Siebert praised her work in Balanchine's Duo Concertant, to Igor Stravinsky's eponymous score for violin and piano performed by Benjamin Bowman and Emily Wong. Of her Flower Girl in Gaîté Parisienne, Apollinaire Scherr of The Financial Times wrote that she "tips like a brimming watering can into the bouquets her wooers hold out to her". Copeland was a "flawless" demi-soloist in Theme and Variations, according to Colleen Boresta of Critical Dance.

In June 2014 at the Met, she danced the Fairy Autumn in the Frederick Ashton Cinderella, cited for her energetic exuberance in the role by Hochman, who missed the "varied texture and nuance that made it significantly more interesting" in the hands of ABT's Christine Shevchenko. That month, she played Lescaut's Mistress in Manon in which role Marjorie Liebert of BroadwayWorld.com described her as "seductive and ingratiating". Also in June, she performed the role of Gamzatti in La Bayadère. Copeland performed the double role of Odette/Odile in Swan Lake in September when the company toured in Brisbane, Australia. Her ascension to more prominent roles occurred as three ABT principal dancers (Paloma Herrera, Julie Kent and Xiomara Reyes) entered their final seasons before retirement. In early October, Copeland performed several pieces including a principal role in Tharp's Bach Partita at Chicago's Auditorium Theatre. In October, Copeland made her New York debut in one of the six principal roles in Tharp's Bach Partita and created a role in Liam Scarlett's With a Chance of Rain. That December, when ABT revived Ratmansky's Nutcracker at the Brooklyn Academy of Music, Copeland played the role of Clara, the Princess. The same month, at the Kennedy Center Honors, she was described as "sublime" in Tchaikovsky's Pas de Deux by the New York City CBS News affiliate.

In March 2015, Copeland danced the role of Princess Florine in The Sleeping Beauty at the Segerstrom Center for the Arts in Costa Mesa, California. She made her American debut as Odette/Odile in Swan Lake with The Washington Ballet, opposite Brooklyn Mack as Prince Siegfried, in April at the Eisenhower Theater in the John F. Kennedy Center for the Performing Arts. The performance was the company's first presentation of Swan Lake in its 70-year history. In May 2015, she played Cowgirl in Rodeo, Bianca in Othello and Zulma in Giselle. In June 2015, Copeland created the small role of the Fairy Fleur de farine (Wheat flower) in Ratmansky's The Sleeping Beauty. The same month, she made her debut as Juliet in Romeo and Juliet on short notice a few days before her scheduled performance on June 20.

Later in June, Copeland became the first black ballerina to dance Odette/Odile in Swan Lake at the Met. Her performance in this "most epic role in world ballet" had been anticipated as "a crowning achievement" in wide-ranging media outlets and by a broad spectrum of fans and supporters. Copeland "was in command of her technique and had the capacity crowd of 4,000 cheering fans believing unreservedly in her ability to appear white swan vulnerable as much as black swan strong." Pioneering dancers Raven Wilkinson and Lauren Anderson presented her with bouquets on stage. Her performance, a critical success, was viewed as a sign that her promotion to principal was forthcoming.

=== Principal dancer ===
On June 30, 2015, Copeland became the first African-American woman promoted to principal ballerina in ABT's 75-year history. Copeland's achievement was groundbreaking, as there have been very few African-American principal ballerinas at major companies. Debra Austin became a principal at Pennsylvania Ballet in 1982, and Lauren Anderson became a principal at Houston Ballet in 1990, the first black principal ballerinas at major American companies. As one critic put it, "Ballet is one of the few art forms ... where discrimination based on colour is still widely practised as an expression of established aesthetics. ... [But] Copeland has the talent and the stage presence: big jumps, a supple arch and full wattage smile on top of tireless energy." According to the 2015 documentary about Copeland, A Ballerina's Tale, until Copeland, "there [had] never been a Black female principal dancer at a major international company".

Copeland played the role of Ivy Smith in the Broadway revival of On The Town for two weeks from August 25, 2015, to September 6. Her debut on Broadway was favorably reviewed in The New York Times, The Washington Post, and other media.

That October, in New York, Copeland performed in the revival of Tharp's choreography of the Brahms-Haydn Variations, in Frederick Ashton's Monotones I, and "brought a seductive mix of demureness and sex appeal to 'Rum and Coca-Cola'" in Paul Taylor's Company B. The same month, she created the role of His Loss in AfterEffect by Marcelo Gomes, danced to Tchaikovsky's Souvenir de Florence, at Lincoln Center. When ABT brought Ratmansky's Nutcracker to Segerstrom Center for the Arts in December 2015, Copeland reprised the role of Clara.

In January 2016, Copeland reprised the role of Princess Florine in The Sleeping Beauty at the Kennedy Center, choreographed by Ratmansky. Her spring 2016 schedule also included leads in ABT productions of The Firebird, La Fille Mal Gardee, Le Corsaire, The Golden Cockerel, Swan Lake and Romeo and Juliet. In 2017, she appeared as a guest artist with La Scala Theatre Ballet when it visited Southern California. In 2019, Copeland danced Harlequinade opposite Calvin Royal III in the roles of Pirrette and Pierrot, in a rare instance of a black couple dancing together in ballet.

Copeland left the ABT stage after a back injury the same year, and she did not perform live during the COVID-19 pandemic, and while raising her son, born in 2022. She retired from ABT in 2025 with a gala farewell performance.

== Other appearances, writings and ventures ==
=== Other appearances 2009–2015 ===
In March 2009, Copeland filmed a music video with Prince for a cover of "Crimson and Clover", the first single from his 2009 album Lotusflower. Prince asked her to dance along to the song in improvised ballet movements. She described his instructions as "Be you, feel the music, just move", and upon request for further instruction, "Keep doing what you're doing". She also began taking acting lessons in 2009. During the New York City and New Jersey portions of Prince's Welcome 2 America tour, Copeland performed a pas de deux en pointe to his song "The Beautiful Ones", the opening number at the Izod Center and Madison Square Garden. Prince had previously invited her onstage at a concert in Nice, France. In April 2011, she performed alongside Prince on the Lopez Tonight show, dancing to "The Beautiful Ones."

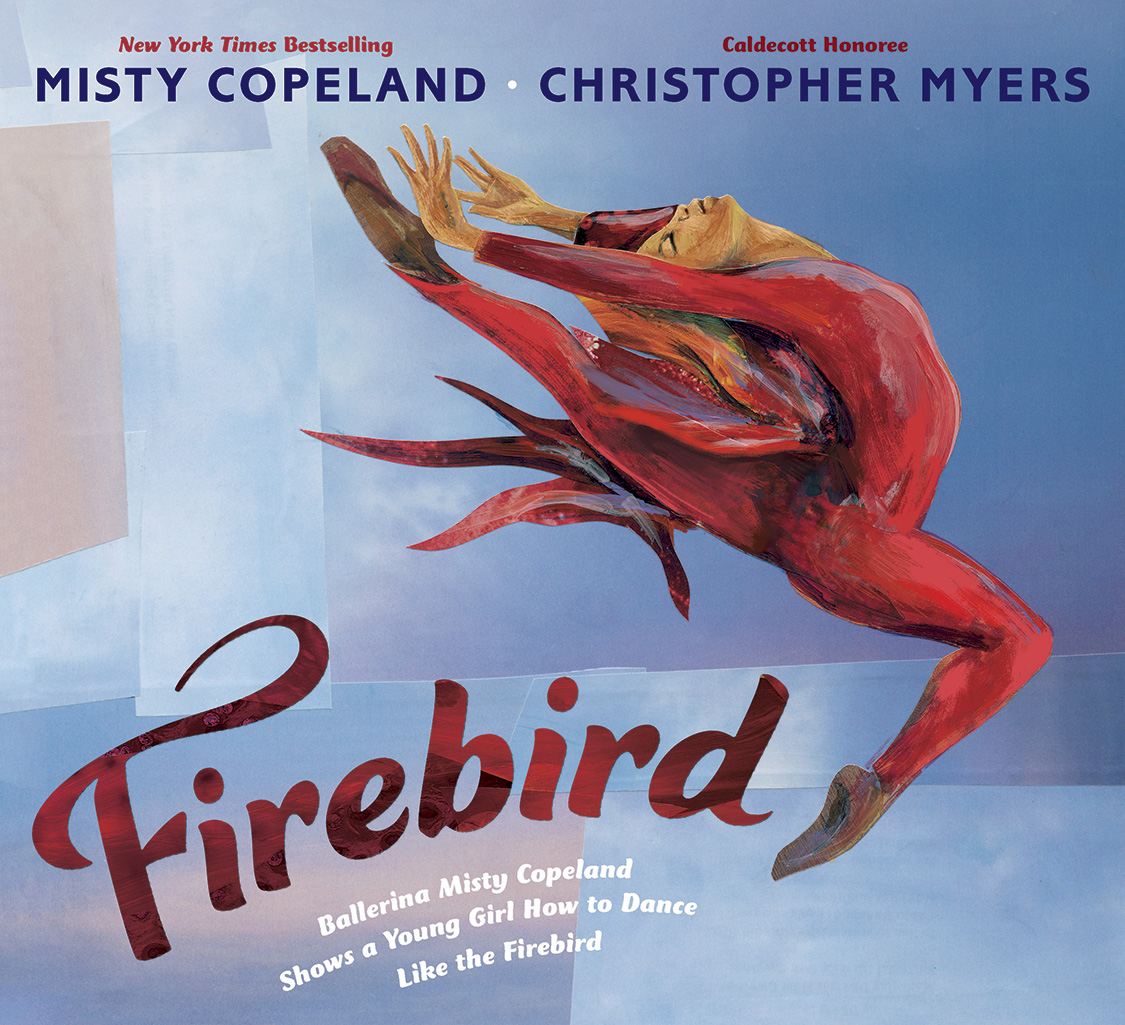
Cover of Firebird, Copeland's 2014 children's book

In 2011, she was featured in the Season 1, episode 5 of the Hulu web series A Day in the Life. Copeland was a guest judge for the 11th season of FOX's So You Think You Can Dance. New Line Cinema has optioned her memoir, Life in Motion, for a screen adaptation, and the Oxygen network has expressed interest in producing a reality docuseries about Copeland mentoring a master class of aspiring young dancers.

A Ballerina's Tale, a documentary film about Copeland, debuted at the Tribeca Film Festival in April 2015 and was released in theaters in October 2015. It was then aired in February 2016 as part of PBS' Independent Lens series. Dawn Heinecken, a professor of women's studies at the University of Louisville, described the film as "part of a calculated media campaign designed to launch Copeland into mainstream celebrity", but stated that the film "directly [challenges] the ideology of white supremacy that undergirds the world of classical ballet." Entertainment Weekly ranked it as one of the best "films that have captured the art of ballet".

In May 2015, Copeland was featured on 60 Minutes in a segment with correspondent Bill Whitaker. The following month, she served as a presenter at the 69th Tony Awards. In July 2015, a black and white book, Misty Copeland: Power and Grace, was released by photographer Richard Corman, with an introduction by Cindy Bradley. The book contains photographs of Copeland dancing at sunrise on and around a baby grand piano that washed ashore under the Brooklyn Bridge. Copeland was included in the 2015 International Best Dressed List, published by Vanity Fair. In October 2015, she performed on The Late Show with Stephen Colbert accompanied by cellist Yo-Yo Ma, who played "Courante" from Bach's Cello Suite No. 2.

=== Other appearances 2016–present ===
In February 2016, Copeland and President Barack Obama were interviewed together in the first of a three part video series with Time and Essence magazines on topics of race, gender, achievement and creating opportunity for young people. The same month, she walked the runway at New York Fashion Week to support the American Heart Association's "Go Red for Women" campaign to increase awareness of the dangers of heart disease for women. She appeared in the March issue of Harper's Bazaar recreating Edgar Degas ballerina poses in a photospread ahead of a Museum of Modern Art exhibition: "Edgar Degas: A Strange New Beauty". The feature was favorably noted by several media outlets, but Sebastian Smee of The Boston Globe argued that contemporary ballet performers take Degas' ballet-themed work too seriously.

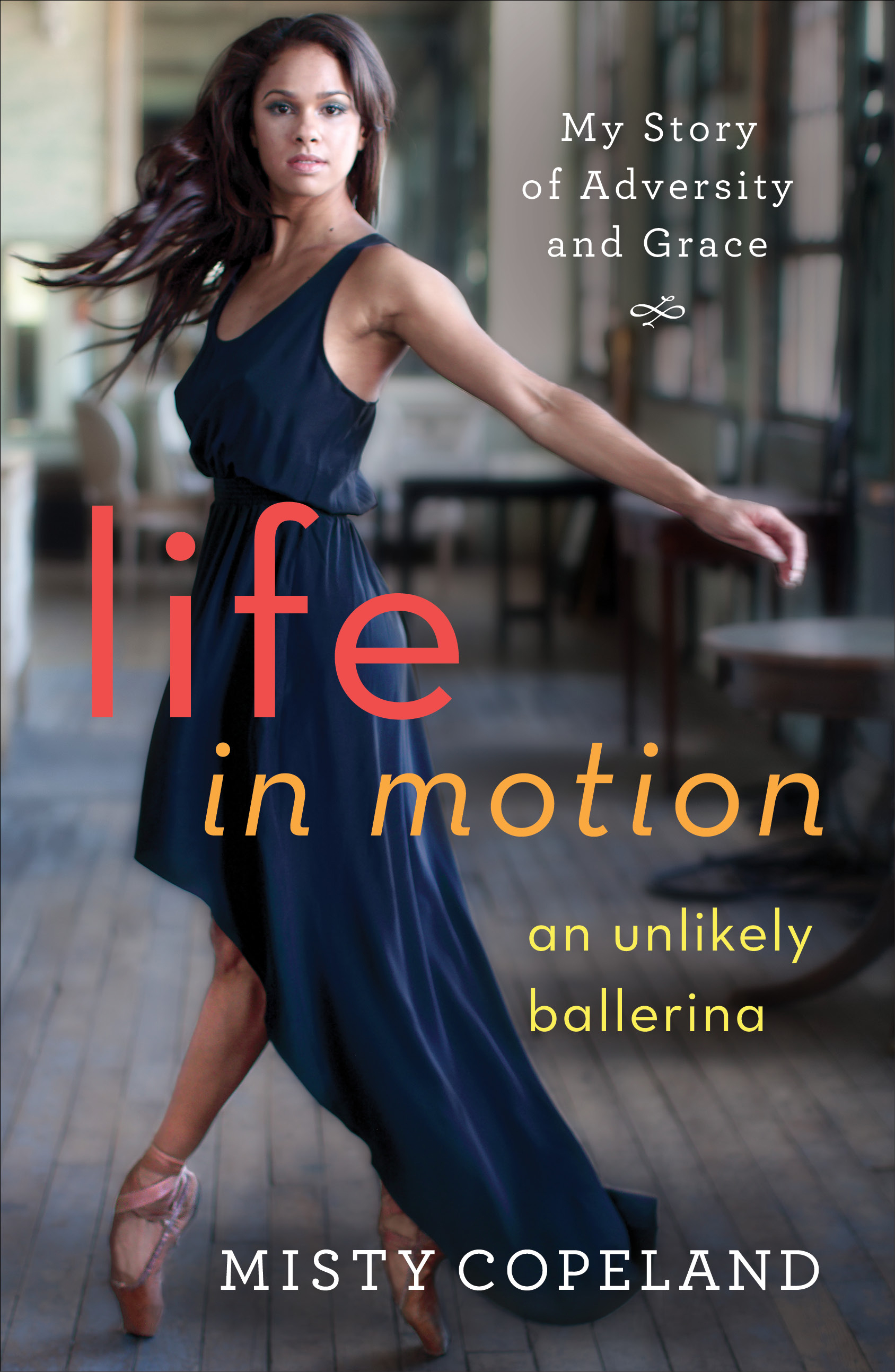
Copeland's first book

Copeland dances the lead ballerina role in the 2018 Disney film, The Nutcracker and the Four Realms, based on the 1816 story "The Nutcracker and the Mouse King". She also voiced herself on a 2016 episode of the animated TV series Peg + Cat, "The Dance Problem/Follow The Bouncing Ball". In 2017, she appeared as a guest judge on World of Dance. Copeland danced with Craig Hall during Taylor Swift's performance of her song "Lover" at the 2019 American Music Awards. She also performed at the 2020 Grammy Awards. In 2022, Copeland served as an executive producer and principal advisor for the documentary film Lift, featuring homeless and at-risk children in New York Theatre Ballet's Project LIFT and the program's director Steven Melendez.

Copeland starred in and co-produced "Flower", a 2023 mostly nonverbal short film about the struggles of a fictional dance teacher caring for her disabled mother, as the family is threatened with homelessness. The film was directed by Lauren Finerman and choreographed by Alonzo King and Rich + Tone Talauega, with music by Raphael Saadiq. It premiered at the Tribeca Film Festival and has been seen at other festivals.

In 2026, she appeared in the 98th Academy Awards broadcast as part of the musical number from the film Sinners, "I Lied to You" (the film's score won the Oscar). Copeland attended that year's Met Gala, themed "Fashion Is Art", wearing a gown designed by Michael Kors.

=== Ventures, writing and philanthropy ===
In 2011, Copeland unveiled a line of dancewear, M by Misty, which she designed. In 2016, she launched another dancewear line, Égal Dance, marketed as inclusive for all body types. She has also produced celebrity calendars. In 2022, she co-founded sports apparel label "Greatness Wins".

Copeland released a memoir in 2014, Life in Motion: An Unlikely Ballerina, co-authored by Charisse Jones. Her 2014 children's picture book, titled Firebird, with illustrator Christopher Myers, has a message of empowerment for young people of color. In 2017, Copeland released the book Ballerina Body, a health and fitness guide. She released a children's book, Bunheads, in 2020, and in 2021 she released Black Ballerinas: My Journey to Our Legacy. In 2022, Copeland released another memoir, The Wind at My Back: Resilience, Grace, and Other Gifts from My Mentor, Raven Wilkinson, co-written with Susan Fales-Hill.

Copeland co-founded a fundraiser, Swans for Relief, which compiled videos made in May 2020 by 32 ballerinas from 14 countries, including Copeland, dancing The Dying Swan. The resulting YouTube video raises funds for each dancer's company's COVID-19 relief fund, or other arts/dance-based relief funds, to alleviate the impact of the COVID-19 pandemic on the dance community. In 2022, she founded The Misty Copeland Foundation, which provides after-school programs for children, ages 8 to 10, that combine affordable ballet training, in the communities where they live, alongside health and wellness, musicianship, mentoring and general tutoring components. The foundation's goals are "to bring greater diversity, equity, and inclusion to dance ... by making ballet affordable, accessible, and fun."

=== Endorsements ===
Copeland was featured in T-Mobile's ads for the BlackBerry in 2010 and an ad for Dr. Pepper in 2013. In 2013, she represented Coach, Inc. and became a spokesperson for Project Plié, a national initiative to broaden the pipeline of leadership within ballet. She also became a brand ambassador for Seiko in 2015. In 2016, Mattel created a Misty Copeland Barbie doll. Later that year, the Dannon Company hired Copeland as a spokesperson for its Oikos brand.

In 2014, Copeland became a sponsored athlete for Under Armour, which paid her more than her ballet career. Her Under Armour women-focused ad campaign was widely publicized, and resulted in her being named an ABC World News Person of the week. The ad campaign was recognized by Adweek as one of The 10 Best Ads of 2014 and as "The year's best campaign targeting women". Copeland, along with Steph Curry and Jordan Spieth, was credited with boosting demand for Under Armour products. In February 2017, Copeland debuted her own collection of activewear for Under Armour. Shortly afterwards, she criticized statements by Under Armour founder and CEO Kevin Plank that praised Donald Trump, stressing that her sponsors should believe in the "importance of diversity and inclusion". Plank responded in an open letter to the Baltimore Sun to state that he supports "a diverse and inclusive America". In July 2017, Under Armour launched a digital ad campaign featuring Copeland, and at the end of that month she became the spokesperson for an Estée Lauder fragrance. W called her Estée Lauder campaign groundbreaking because cosmetics companies have rarely employed spokespersons other than models. In 2021, she was engaged by Ford to promote the Mustang Mach-E online. To help promote the release of the 2025 film Wicked: For Good, Copeland danced, as Cynthia Erivo sang, in a "reimagined" video version of the song "No Good Deed".

== Honors ==
In 2008, Copeland won the Leonore Annenberg Fellowship in the Arts, which funds study with master teachers and trainers outside of ABT. The two-year fellowships are in recognition of "young artists of extraordinary talent with the goal of providing them with additional resources in order to fully realise their potential". In 2013, she was named National Youth of the Year Ambassador by the Boys & Girls Clubs of America. In 2014, Copeland was named to the President's Council on Sports, Fitness, and Nutrition and received an honorary doctorate from the University of Hartford for her contributions to classical ballet and helping to diversify the art form. Copeland was a Dance Magazine Awards 2014 honoree. After her promotion as principal dancer, Copeland was named one of Glamour's Women of the Year for 2015; one of ESPN's 2015 Impact 25 athletes and influencers who have made the greatest impact for women in sports; one of Barbara Walters' 10 "most fascinating" people of 2015; and one of the Time 100. As a result, Copeland appeared on the cover of Time, making her the first dancer on the cover since Bill T. Jones in 1994. In 2016, Copeland won a Shorty Award for Best in Dance in Social Media.

In 2021, the NAACP awarded to Copeland its highest honor, the Spingarn Medal. Copeland has also received honorary doctorates from New York University in 2023 and Wake Forest University in 2026. In 2026, Copeland received the Golden Plate Award of the American Academy of Achievement.

== Personal life ==
Copeland enjoys cooking. She and her husband, attorney Olu Evans, live on Manhattan's Upper West Side. The couple disclosed their engagement in a 2015 cover story in Essence magazine. They married in California on July 31, 2016. They have one child, a son, who was born in 2022.

== Published works ==
- Copeland, Misty; with Charisse Jones (2014). Life in Motion: An Unlikely Ballerina. New York: Touchstone Books, published by Simon & Schuster. ISBN 978-1-4767-3798-0. OCLC 852226309.
- Copeland, Misty (2014). Firebird: Ballerina Misty Copeland Shows a Young Girl How to Dance Like the Firebird. New York: G.P. Putnam's Sons Books for Young Readers. ISBN 978-0-399-16615-0. OCLC 881386397.
- Copeland, Misty (2015). Misty Copeland: Power and Grace. Photographs by Richard Corman. New York: Michael Friedman Group. ISBN 978-0692493236. OCLC 915488693.
- Copeland, Misty; with Charisse Jones (2017). Ballerina Body: Dancing and Eating Your Way to a Leaner, Stronger, and More Graceful You. New York: Grand Central Life & Style. ISBN 978-1455596300. OCLC 953598345.
- Glass, Calliope (2018). The Dance of the Realms. The Nutcracker and the Four Realms. Introduction by Misty Copeland; illustrated by Marco Bucci. Los Angeles: Disney Press. ISBN 978-1368020367. OCLC 1044565014.
- Copeland, Misty (2020). Bunheads. Illustrated by Setor Fiadzigbey. New York: G.P. Putnam's Sons Books for Young Readers. ISBN 978-0399547645. OCLC 1137745453.
- Copeland, Misty (2021). Black Ballerinas: My Journey to Our Legacy. New York: Aladdin, an imprint of Simon & Schuster. ISBN 978-0692493236. OCLC 1237349801.
- Copeland, Misty; with Susan Fales-Hill (2022). The Wind at My Back: Resilience, Grace, and Other Gifts from My Mentor, Raven Wilkinson. New York: Grand Central Publishing. ISBN 978-1538753859. OCLC 1303671778.

== See also ==
- List of dancers
