= Nelson George =

American writer and filmmaker

- George in 2026
- Born: September 1, 1957 (age 69); Brooklyn, New York, US
- Education: St. John's University
- Occupations: Author; columnist; music & culture critic; filmmaker
- Years active: 1978–present
- Spouse: Malika Weeden
- Awards: Grammy Award, Album Liner Notes, James Brown Star Time Box Set, 1991

Nelson George (born September 1, 1957) is an American author, columnist, music and culture critic, journalist, and filmmaker. He has been nominated twice for the National Book Critics Circle Award.

== Biography ==
George attended St. John's University. He was an intern at the New York Amsterdam News before being hired as black music editor for Record World. He later served as a music editor for Billboard magazine from 1982 to 1989. While there, George published two books: Where Did Our Love Go: The Rise and Fall of the Motown Sound in 1986, and The Death of Rhythm & Blues in 1988. He also wrote a column, entitled "Native Son", for the Village Voice from 1988 to 1992. He first got involved in film when, in 1986, he helped to finance director Spike Lee's debut feature She's Gotta Have It.

A lifelong resident of Brooklyn, New York, George still resides in the Fort Greene section of the borough.

== Literary work ==
George has authored numerous non-fiction books, including the bestseller The Michael Jackson Story in 1984, Blackface: Reflections on African-Americans and the Movies in 1994, Elevating the Game: Black Men and basketball in 1992, and Hip Hop America in 1998. In 2005, he published Post-Soul Nation, which further developed his concept of "post-soul" black culture. With Alan Leeds, he co-authored The James Brown Reader, a collection of articles about the "Godfather of Soul," in 2008.

George's The Death of Rhythm and Blues chronicles and critiques the path that R&B has taken. He takes a close look at the genre's fall to the hands of the mainstream and even suggests that some popular artists "sold out". George further articulates in the book that many of the middle-class black Americans that listen to R&B began assimilating into white culture and losing their black roots.

George has written five detective novels featuring bodyguard-turned-private investigator D Hunter. All three novels—The Accidental Hunter, The Plot Against Hip-Hop: A Novel, and The Lost Treasures of R&B—have been optioned by rapper/actor Common.

== Film and television work ==
In 1991, George co-wrote the Halle Berry vehicle Strictly Business, and in 1993, he was co-creator of the movie CB4 starring comedian Chris Rock.

In 2004, George made a short film called To Be a Black Man, starring Samuel L. Jackson, and a documentary called A Great Day in Hip-Hop. Both titles appeared in festivals in New York, London, and Amsterdam. He executive-produced the HBO film Everyday People which also debuted in 2004 at the Sundance Film Festival.

He served as co-executive producer of VH1's Hip Hop Honors television show and executive producer of Black Entertainment Television's American Gangster series, which was the highest rated series in the history of BET in 2006. His directorial debut, Life Support, starring Queen Latifah, aired on HBO on March 10, 2007. Latifah won several awards for her performance as Ana Wallace, including a Golden Globe, Screen Actors Guild award, and the NAACP Image Award. Life Support was also named best TV film of the year by the NAACP. He also hosted the VH-1 series Soul Cities, which examined the music and culture of six prominent cities in the U.S.

A resident of Fort Greene, Brooklyn, for more than 25 years, George wrote, narrated, and co-directed with Diane Paragas the 2012 feature documentary Brooklyn Boheme, portraying the uniquely vibrant and diverse African-American artistic community of Fort Greene and Clinton Hill during the 1980s and '90's that included Spike Lee, Chris Rock, Branford Marsalis, Rosie Perez, Saul Williams, Lorna Simpson, Toshi Reagon, writer Touré, writer Adario Strange, Guru of Gang Starr, Erykah Badu, and Talib Kweli, among many others. Unlike the legendary Harlem Renaissance of the 1920s, which was largely a literary scene, the artists collected in these neighborhoods were as involved with newer means of expression (film, rock music, hip hop, avant garde theater, stand-up comedy, photography) as with traditional African-American artistic pursuits (poetry, jazz). The film premiered on Showtime Networks in February 2012 for Black History Month. Finding The Funk was released in March 2013; the film traced the history of funk music from the 1960s to the present day. This documentary included interviews with musicians such as D'Angelo, Sly Stone, Bootsy Collins, Mike D, Sheila E, and countless others. It was aired on VH1 on February 14, 2013. In 2015, George released A Ballerina's Tale, a documentary on Misty Copeland, a principal ballet dancer for ABT (American Ballet Theatre).

In 2023 he was an executive producer of a new CBC docuseries Black Life: Untold Stories that examined the history, experiences and contributions of Black Canadians in broad area of the culture, including music, hip-hop, sports, to slavery and policing.

== Bibliography ==
=== Books ===
- The Michael Jackson Story (December 1983)
- Where Did Our Love Go: The Rise and Fall of the Motown Sound (1986; re-issued 2007)
- The Death of Rhythm & Blues (1988; reissued 2003)
- Elevating the Game: Black Men and Basketball (January 1992)
- Buppies, B-Boys, Baps & Bohos: Notes on Post-Soul Black Culture (February 1993)
- Blackface: Reflections on African-Americans and the Movies (October 1994)
- Seduced (April 1996)
- One Woman Short (August 2001)
- Life and Def: Sex, Drugs, Money, and God (December 2001), Contributor - Russell Simmons
- Show & Tell (2002)
- Night Work: A Novel (May 2003)
- Hip Hop America (April 2005)
- Post-Soul Nation: The Explosive, Contradictory, Triumphant, and Tragic 1980s as Experienced by African Americans (Previously Known as Blacks and Before That Negroes) (April 2005)
- The James Brown Reader: Fifty Years of Writing About the Godfather of Soul (April 2008), Contributor - Alan Leeds
- City Kid: A Writer's Memoir of Ghetto Life and Post-Soul Success (April 2009)
- Thriller: The Musical Life of Michael Jackson (June 2010)
- The Plot Against Hip Hop: A Novel (A D Hunter Mystery) (November 2011)
- The Hippest Trip in America: Soul Train and the Evolution of Culture & Style (March 2014)
- The Lost Treasures of R&B (A D Hunter Mystery) (January 2015)
- The Accidental Hunter (A D Hunter Mystery) (February 2015)
- The Darkest Hearts (A D Hunter Mystery) (2020)
- The Nelson George Mixtape Volume 1 (2021)

== Filmography ==
- Def by Temptation, 1990, executive producer
- Strictly Business, 1991, associate producer
- Just Another Girl on the I.R.T., 1992, associate producer
- CB4, 1993, producer, writer
- Everyday People, 2004, executive producer
- The N-Word, 2004, producer
- Good Hair, 2009, producer
- Left Unsaid, 2010, director, producer
- Brooklyn Boheme, 2011, director, producer
- All Hail the Beat, 2012, director, producer
- Finding the Funk, 2013, director, producer
- Top Five, 2014, associate producer
- A Ballerina's Tale, 2015, director, producer
- The Get Down, 2017, writer, producer
- Tales from the Tour Bus, 2019, producer
- The Black Godfather, 2019, producer
- With Drawn Arms, 2020, co-executive producer
- A Grammy Salute to The Sounds of Change, 2021, writer
- Say Hey Willie Mays!, 2022, director
- Dear Mama, 2023, executive producer
- Thriller 40, 2023, director
