= New York Theatre Ballet =

New York Theatre Ballet or NYTB was founded in 1978 by Diana Byer, who became its artistic director. Dedicated to the principles of the Cecchetti-Diaghilev tradition, the company both reprises classic masterworks and produces original ballets.

New York Theatre Ballet has performed works by choreographers including Richard Alston, Frederick Ashton, George Balanchine, Gemma Bond, August Bournonville, Michel Fokine, David Gordon, José Limón, John Taras, and Antony Tudor. The company tours its family and adult programs both nationally and abroad, and has become the most widely seen chamber ballet company in the United States.

== Ballet mistresses ==
The British ballet teacher Margaret Craske was ballet mistress for New York Theatre Ballet from its foundation until late in her life. Craske was succeeded by Sallie Wilson, a student of hers, who was ballet mistress until 2008. Wilson staged works by Antony Tudor for New York Theatre Ballet and also choreographed her own pieces.

== Project LIFT ==
New York Theatre Ballet runs LIFT, a community program to give underprivileged children the chance to learn to dance. Steven Melendez, a former Project LIFT student, is the current director of the project. In 2022, Melendez and the LIFT program were featured in the documentary Lift, which premiered at the Tribeca Festival.

== Eviction and relocation ==
In the summer of 2013 New York Theatre Ballet began a fight against eviction from its home of over 30 years in the historic Parish House of the Madison Avenue Baptist Church at 30 East 31st Street in Manhattan, after the building was sold to a private developer. The eviction generated interest as far away as Serbia, however, in early 2015, the company moved into the space formerly occupied by Richard Foreman's Ontological-Hysteric Theater in St. Mark's Church-in-the-Bowery in the East Village.
