= Sallie Wilson =

Sallie Wilson (April 18, 1932, Fort Worth, Texas – April 27, 2008) was a ballerina who appeared with New York City Ballet where she danced opposite Martha Graham in the premiere of Graham and George Balanchine's collaboration at NYCB, Episodes in May, 1959, and subsequently with American Ballet Theatre, where she was associated with several ballets created by Antony Tudor. In 1966, she achieved a triumph as Hagar in ABT's revival of Tudor's ballet Pillar of Fire, set to the music of Arnold Schoenberg's Transfigured Night. The ballet is loosely based on the poem that inspired the Schoenberg piece (although rather loosely) rather than the Biblical story of Hagar.

Wilson made one television appearance, as Mrs. Stahlbaum, the mother of Clara (Gelsey Kirkland), in Mikhail Baryshnikov's television version of Tschaikovsky's The Nutcracker, and one film appearance, in the 1973 PBS documentary American Ballet Theatre: A Close-Up in Time. She also appeared on Merv Griffin's television special "Sidewalks of New England" in 1968, performing a dance from Agnes DeMille's "Fall River Legend".

Wilson was a ballet mistress for New York Theatre Ballet when she died of cancer in Manhattan, on April 27, 2008.

== Choreography ==
Wilson choreographed several ballets. Her first two choreographic works, Liederspiel (1978) and Fête (1979) were created on the Arlington Dance Theater (Arlington, Virginia), under the direction of Carmen Mathé (former ballerina with London Festival Ballet, National Ballet of Washington, and Ballet Chicago). She cast Ken Ludden as the lead male in both of those works. She then choreographed two ballets, Pandora's Box and Eve, in Italy for her fellow ballerina and longtime friend Carla Fracci. Back in New York, she became an artistic consultant with the Poughkeepsie Ballet Theatre, and formed a dance partnership with Ludden, who was a principal dancer with that company. Wilson and Ludden danced a reworking of Gilbert Reed's Fiddler's Child (1981 at the Bardavon Theater), a role Wilson had premiered earlier at the Spoleto Festival with ballet star Lawrence Rhodes. Wilson and Ludden also appeared in Reed's Romance (1982), a duet created specifically for them.

Wilson's next work was "Piazza San Marco" (1983) which she choreographed for herself and Ludden. Also in 1983, Wilson appeared in the title role of Ludden's Royal Invitation: Homage to the Queen of Tonga at the Kennedy Center for the Performing Arts in Washington, DC. After that, Wilson went on to create two more works Idyll (1983) and Cheri (1985), again featuring Ludden in all but the final work. In 1986 the Riverside Dance Festival presented Dances by Sallie Wilson and Ken Ludden in which the pair presented a mixed program of works they had choreographed.
