= Ethel Winter =

American dancer (1924–2012)

Ethel Winter (June 18, 1924 – March 10, 2012) was an American dancer and dance instructor. Winter was specifically a modern dancer - a member of the Martha Graham Dance Company from the 1940s through the 1960s, working with other notable members of the company, including Martha Graham, Bertram Ross, Yuriko, Pearl Lang, Ethel Butler, Jean Erdman, and Patricia Birch. She taught modern dance at the Juilliard School Dance Division for fifty years, retiring in 2003.

Ethel Winter was notable for having been given dance roles by Martha Graham originally choreographed for herself during her early years as a choreographer.

Winter was born in Wrentham, Massachusetts. She died in Manhattan, New York City, on March 10, 2012, at the age of 87.
