= Paul Boos =

American dancer

Paul Boos (born June 2, 1958, in Sioux Falls, South Dakota) is an American dancer, ballet master, archivist, and répétiteur. He danced with New York City Ballet from 1977 until 1990 before becoming a guest teacher for the Royal Danish Ballet. In addition to teaching internationally, he is part of a select group of répétiteurs sanctioned by the Balanchine Trust to set the ballets of George Balanchine. Having previously served as Project Associate since 2016, in 2021, Boos was appointed to Director of the Video Archives for the George Balanchine Foundation.

== Early life and career ==
Boos was born and raised in Sioux Falls, South Dakota. In a variation on the "Billy Elliot story", he started studying dance when his mother enrolled his two sisters in ballet class and was persuaded to sign him up as well. At 15, while attending a dance convention in Chicago, Boos was invited by David Howard to study at the Harkness House on full scholarship. Following that summer intensive, he auditioned for the American Ballet Theatre School where Patricia Wilde offered him a stipend and a double scholarship to the ABT school and the Professional Children's School. After a year of study he successfully auditioned for the School of American Ballet where he was taught by Mme. Antonina Tumkovsky and Stanley Williams and worked with Suki Schorer, Alexandra Danilova, Jerome Robbins, and George Balanchine. At the conclusion of his graduating SAB Student Workshop performances, in which he danced principal roles in Balanchine's Symphony in C and Robbins' Dances at a Gathering, Boos was assigned to work with Balanchine on Juilliard's production of Le roi malgré lui. During these rehearsals he was invited to join New York City Ballet. He was 18 years old.

Described as "an elegant dancer of compelling dignity", while at City Ballet Boos danced a diverse range of featured roles and original parts from the Balanchine and Robbins ballets. For Balanchine, his repertoire included A Midsummer Night's Dream, Symphony in C, Le Tombeau de Couperin, The Four Temperaments, Who Cares?, Donizetti Variations, The Nutcracker, Chaconne, Danses Concertantes, La Sonnambula, Kammermusik No. 2, Allegro Brillante, Diamonds, Stars & Stripes, and Stravinsky Violin Concerto. For Robbins, he danced in The Goldberg Variations, Glass Pieces, Eight Lines, The Four Seasons, Fanfare, Piccolo Balletto, Verdi Variations, and Dances at a Gathering.

In 1990, after dancing with City Ballet for 13 years, Boos moved to Copenhagen to accept a position as guest teacher with the Royal Danish Ballet.

== Ballet master and répétiteur ==
After a year of teaching at the Royal Danish Ballet, Boos received a telegram from Balanchine's longtime assistant Barbara Horgan asking him to rehearse Serenade and Theme and Variations at the Mikhailovsky Theatre in St. Petersburg. Upon successfully completing this assignment, in 1992 he was appointed a sanctioned répétiteur for the Balanchine Trust, a select group who are tasked with setting Balanchine's ballets on dance companies around the world. As a répétiteur his job is to protect the integrity of the copyrights of George Balanchine's work in the present and for the future. In tandem with staging ballets, Boos also serves as balletmaster and master teacher in order to properly prepare dancers to perform the works of Balanchine.

On behalf of the Balanchine Trust, Boos has set ballets on some of world's leading dance companies, including the Bolshoi Ballet, Paris Opera Ballet, Mariinsky Ballet, Het Nationale Ballet, Boston Ballet, La Scala Theatre Ballet, Pacific Northwest Ballet, National Opera and Ballet of Bulgaria, Sarasota Ballet, and Tokyo Ballet. In addition to his work as balletmaster and répétiteur, since 2016 Boos has served as Project Associate of the George Balanchine Foundation's Interpreters Archive. In 2021, he was appointed to Director of Video Archives of the Balanchine Foundation. In this capacity, Boos works with Nancy Reynolds to preserve Balanchine's oeuvre by recording original principal cast members and dancers who worked closely with Balanchine as they coach dancers of today.

When he is not setting ballets or conducting research, Boos teaches open classes at Steps on Broadway as one of their guest teachers, and serves as the Head of the Pre-Professional Division at Rye Ballet Conservatory in Rye, New York.

== Balanchine Trust Ballets ==
Ballet	Dance Company
Agon	Paris Opera Ballet, Boston Ballet, Royal Swedish Ballet, Leipzig Opera Ballet, Ballet Austin, Ballet Idaho, and Washington Ballet (with Vicky Simon)
Allegro Brillante	Ballet Idaho, Sadamatsu Hamada Ballet Company
Apollo	Joffrey Ballet, National Ballet of Mexico, Kansas City Ballet, Minnesota Ballet, Bordeaux National Ballet, and National Opera and Ballet of Bulgaria
Ballet Imperial	Tokyo Ballet (with Merrill Ashley)
Diamonds	Bolshoi Ballet (with Merrill Ashley)
Kammermusik #2	Het Nationale Ballet (with Karin Von Aroldingen), Het Nationale Ballet and Los Angeles Ballet (with Colleen Neary), Perm Opera and Ballet Theatre, Boston Ballet and Louisville Ballet (with Kathleen Tracey)
The Four Temperaments	Miami City Ballet, Oklahoma City Ballet
The Prodigal Son	Paris Opera Ballet, La Scala Ballet, Kirov/Mariinsky Ballet (with Karin Von Aroldingen), Cincinnati Ballet (with Edward Villella), Suzanne Farrell Ballet (with Suzanne Farrell), Arizona Ballet (with Ib Andersen), Ballet du Capitole, Polish National Ballet, K-ballet Tokyo, Kansas City Ballet, Oregon Ballet Theatre, Sarasota Ballet, Grand Rapids Ballet, Lithuanian National Ballet
Rubies (Capriccio for Piano and Orchestra)	Perm Opera and Ballet Theatre, Hong Kong Ballet, Cincinnati Ballet, Ballet Austin, Ballet Idaho, Indiana University Bloomington
Serenade	Paris Opera Ballet, Mikhailovsky Ballet, National Ballet of Romania, Oklahoma City Ballet, Korea National University of Arts, Grand Theatre; Poznan Opera
Stravinsky Violin Concerto	Bordeaux National Ballet, Louisville Ballet, Pacific Northwest Ballet (with Colleen Neary), Boston Ballet (with Colleen Neary), Pennsylvania Ballet (with Colleen Neary)
Symphony in C	New National Theater; Tokyo, Karlsruhe Ballet, Het Nationale Ballet School (4th Movement), Cincinnati Ballet (with Vicky Simon)
Tschaikovsky Pas de Deux	National Ballet of Mexico, Het National Ballet School, BalletMet 2
Theme and Variations	Mikhailovsky Ballet, Tokyo Ballet, Richmond Ballet (with Jerri Kumery)
Valse-Fantaisie	National Ballet of Romania, Point Park University, Minnesota Ballet, Ballet Vero Beach/Ballet Nebraska, Ballet Idaho

== Personal life ==
Boos is the sixth of seven children. His father was a marine, sheriff, U.S. Marshal, and state representative. His mother was a nurse and founding director of the South Dakota School of Nursing. His parents met while they were both serving in the military during World War II.

In 2013, Boos married Hajime Issan Koyama, a Japanese Soto Zen Buddhist priest and hospice chaplain. The couple lives in New York City.
