= Charlotte Ballet =

American ballet company

General information
- Name: Charlotte Ballet
- Previous names: North Carolina Dance Theatre
- Year founded: 1970
- Website: charlotteballet.org

Artistic staff
- Artistic Director: Alejandro Cerrudo

Other
- Associated schools: Charlotte Ballet Academy
- Formation: Company; Apprentice; Trainee

Charlotte Ballet is the oldest professional ballet company in North Carolina. It was founded as North Carolina Dance Theatre in Winston-Salem by Robert Lindgren, who was then Dean of Dance at the University of North Carolina School of the Arts, in 1970. It moved to Charlotte in 1990 and rebranded as Charlotte Ballet in 2014. It currently has 26 dancers and is the parent company of the Charlotte Ballet Academy.

== Artistic staff ==
- Alejandro Cerrudo - Artistic Director
- Douglas Singleton - Executive Director
- Patricia McBride - Associate Artistic Director & Master Teacher
- Traci Gilchrest Kubie - Rehearsal Director

== Dancers ==
=== Company ===
Name	Hometown	Seasons With Company	Training
Juwan Alston	Round Rock, TX	4	University of North Carolina School of the Arts
Raven Barkley	Bronx, NY	4	Fiorello H. LaGuardia High School, Dance Theatre of Harlem's Pre-Professional Program, SUNY Purchase
Chelsea Dumas	Fort Wayne, IN	6	Indiana University's Jacobs School of Music, Charlotte Ballet Apprentice
Colby Foss	Fargo, ND	2	University of Arizona, Company member with Ballet Nouveau
Drew Grant	Devon, PA	3	School of American Ballet, Company member with Los Angeles Ballet, Atlanta Ballet, BalletMet, Carolina Ballet and Stadt Theater Chemnitz in Germany
Josh Hall	Syracuse, NY	7	University of North Carolina School of the Arts
Sarah Hayes Harkins	Waynesville, NC	11	University of North Carolina School of the Arts
Ben Ingel	Charlotte, NC	5	University of North Carolina School of the Arts, Houston Ballet Academy, Charlotte Ballet Academy, Charlotte Ballet 2
Alessandra Ball James	Atlanta, GA	14	Gwinnett Ballet Academy, Company member with Colorado Ballet, Charlotte Ballet 2
James Kopecky	Lake Villa, IL	3	Butler University, Company member with Ballet San Jose
Sarah Lapointe	Bel Air, MD	4	Rock School for Dance Education, YAGP Finalist, National YoungArts Dance Finalist, Guest artist with the Washington Ballet
Peter Mazuroski	Bow, NH	3	Boston Ballet School, Billy in Billy Elliot the Musical on Broadway
Maurice Mouzon Jr	Baltimore, MD	3	Baltimore School for the Arts, SUNY Purchase
David Preciado	Los Angeles, CA	2	San Francisco Ballet School Trainee, Los Angeles Ballet Academy, YAGP Finalist, Charlotte Ballet 2
Amelia Sturt-Dilley	Gypsum, CO	4	Walnut Hill School, Juilliard School
Elizabeth Truell	Columbia, SC	5	Pittsburgh Ballet Theatre School, Charlotte Ballet 2
Shaina Wire	Sussex County, NJ	3	University of North Carolina School of the Arts, Joffrey Ballet School
Anson Zwingelberg	Myrtle Beach, SC	2	South Carolina Governor's School for the Arts and Humanities, Juilliard School

=== Charlotte Ballet II ===
Name	Hometown	Seasons With Company	Training
Elisabeth Baehman	Palm City, FL	1	Dance Academy of Stuart, Charlotte Ballet Apprentice
Elaina da Fonte	La Porte, IN	2	University of North Carolina School of the Arts, Jacobs School of Music Ballet
Thomas Donohue	Stony Point, NY	1	Boston Ballet School
Victoria Jaenson	Guilford, VT	1	Rock School for Dance Education, The Hartt School at the University of Hartford
Jared Sutton	Charlotte, NC	1	Charlotte Ballet Academy, Charlotte Ballet Pre-Professional Division, University of North Carolina School of the Arts
Andrès Trezevant	Las Vegas, NV	1	Hubbard Street Professional Program
Karlee Vadalabene-Donley	Marthasville, MO	1	Charlotte Ballet Pre-Professional Division, Saint Louis Ballet
Macyn Vogt	Newburgh, IN	1	San Francisco Ballet School, trainee with the Joffrey Ballet

=== Trainees ===
Name	Hometown	Seasons With Company	Training
Celeste Borman	Charlotte, NC	4	Charlotte Ballet Academy
Erinn Crittenden	Fontana, CA	2	Pittsburgh Ballet Theatre School
Lilly Fife	Zionsville, IN	1	Boston Ballet School
Nicholas Holtz	Fort Pierce, FL	1	Chautauqua Institution
Roxy Shackelford	Macon, GA	2	Atlanta Ballet Centre for Dance Education
Julia Vinez	Stuart, FL	1	Harid Conservatory
Lara Bircak	Charlotte, NC	2	Charlotte Ballet Academy
Alexander Carrazzone	Ossining, NY	1	Chautauqua Institution, The Hartt School at University of Hartford
Carrington Clark	Charlotte, NC	3	Charlotte Ballet Academy
Sarah Clarke	Pittsburgh, PA	1	Central Pennsylvania Youth Ballet
Gabrielle Cutrona	Charlotte, NC	2	Charlotte Ballet Academy
Emerson Dayton	Pittsburgh, PA	1	San Francisco Ballet School, Central Pennsylvania Youth Ballet
Gianna DeMassio	New York, NY	1	Pittsburgh Ballet Theatre School
Will Giannuzzi	Charlotte, NC	1	University of North Carolina School of the Arts
Gabrielle Moore	Greenville, SC	2	Charlotte Ballet Academy
Kiera Morgan	Redington Beach, FL	2	Sarasota Ballet School
Belle Powell	Columbus, OH	1	University of North Carolina School of the Arts
Amelia Snyder	Atlanta, GA	2	Gwinnett Ballet Theatre
Olivia Vessillo	Cary, NC	1	Cary Ballet Conservatory
Logan Velasquez	Chicago, IL	2	Next Generation Ballet

== Repertoire ==
Charlotte Ballet has performed an extensive repertoire over the years. With two of the company's leaders, Patricia McBride and Jean-Pierre Bonnefoux having extensive ties to George Balanchine and Jerome Robbins and major contemporary dance choreographer Dwight Rhoden being the choreographer-in-residence, Charlotte Ballet has become a major hub for neoclassical and contemporary work.

=== George Balanchine ===
- Agon
- Allegro Brillante
- Apollo
- Concerto Barocco
- Divertimento No. 15
- The Four Temperaments
- La Sonnambula
- A Midsummer Night's Dream
- Pas de Dix
- Raymonda Variations
- Rubies
- Scotch Symphony
- Serenade
- Square Dance
- Stars and Stripes
- Stravinsky Violin Concerto
- Tarantella
- Tschaikovsky Pas de Deux
- Valse Fantaisie
- Walpurgisnacht
- Western Symphony
- Who Cares?

=== Marius Petipa ===
- Swan Lake
- Sleeping Beauty
- Raymonda
- Paquita
- Don Quixote

=== Jiří Kylián ===
- Sechz Tänze
- Forgotten Land

=== Twyla Tharp ===
- Nine Sinatra Songs
- The Golden Section

=== Alvin Ailey ===
- The River
- Night Creature

=== Dwight Rhoden ===
- The Groove
- Spun to The Sky
- Bop Doo Wah
- Alleged Dances
- Artifice
- Othello
- Peace Piece
- Sit In Stand Out
- Gateways
- Ballad Unto
- Broken Fantasy

=== William Forsythe ===
- In the middle, somewhat elevated

=== Sasha Janes ===
- Sketches from Grace
- Lascia la Spina Cogli la Rosa
- We Danced Through Life
- Shelter
- You're So Fine
- Queen
- Last Lost Chance
- Utopia
- Facsimile
- The Weight of Darkness
- At First Sight
- Rhapsodic Dances
- The Four Seasons
- Dangerous Liaisons
- The Seed and Soil
- Chaconne

=== Alonzo King ===
- Salt
- Map

=== Other classics ===
- Nutcracker (Choreographed by Salvatore Aiello, then Jean-Pierre Bonnefoux)
- Cinderella (Choreographed by Jean-Pierre Bonnefoux)
- Romeo and Juliet (Choreographed by Jean Pierre Bonnefoux)
- Carmina Burana (Choreographed by Jean-Pierre Bonnefoux)
- The Little Mermaid (Choreographed by Mark Diamond)
- Peter Pan (Choreographed by Jean-Pierre Bonnefoux)
- Wuthering Heights (Choreographed by Sasha Janes)
- Carmen (Choreographed by Sasha Janes)

== Education ==
Charlotte Ballet is the parent company to the Charlotte Ballet Academy, formerly the North Carolina Dance Theatre School of Dance. The school was founded in September 1993. By 1997, 3 satellite locations had been established to accommodate the then 5 level divisions and an Open Division. The school now offers a conservatory program, developed in 2004, for serious dance students who wishes to incorporate their dance classes with their academics.
