= Professional Children's School =

College preparatory school in New York City

Coordinates: 40°46′14″N 73°59′10″W

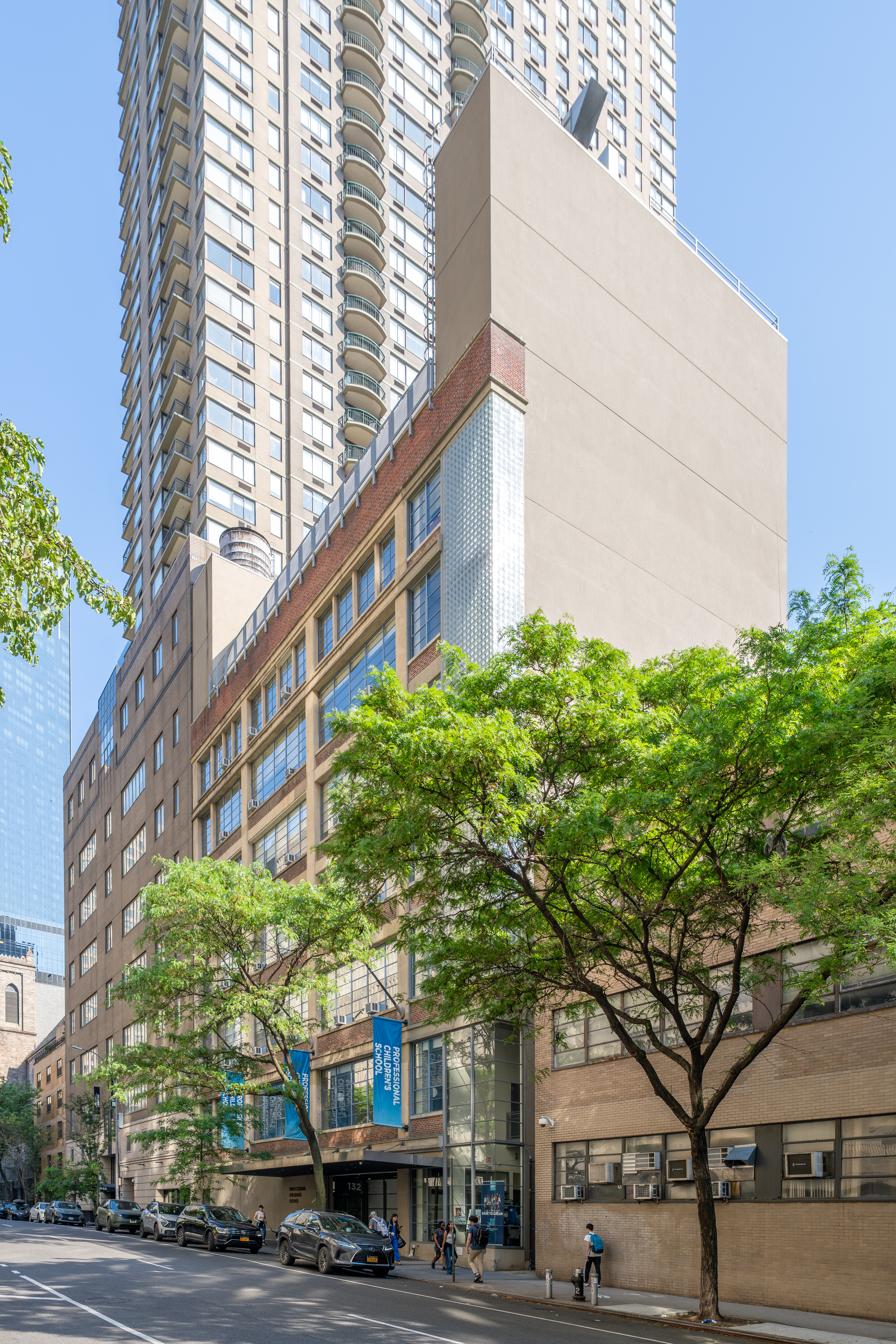
- (2026)

Information
- Established: 1914; 112 years ago
- Founders: Jean Greer; Jane Harris Hall
- Grades: 4-12
- Website: pcs-nyc.org

The Professional Children's School (PCS) is a not-for-profit, college-preparatory school geared toward working and aspiring child actors and dancers in grades four through twelve. The school was founded in New York City in 1914 to provide an academic education to young people working on the New York stage, in vaudeville, or "on the road".

PCS was co-founded by Jean Greer and Jane Harris Hall when they learned that children who were working in entertainment were not able to attend traditional school, in part because acting was considered an unsavory activity for children. The school's premises were originally at The Rehearsal Club on West 45th Street in Midtown Manhattan, and later at 1860 Broadway, near West 61st Street, on Manhattan’s Upper West Side. It subsequently moved to 132 West 60th Street in the Lincoln Square neighborhood of Manhattan.

The school's curriculum and hours have changed over time. The New York Times wrote in 1994 that it "is the country's only fully accredited nonprofit school offering an academic college-preparatory education for those studying for careers in the arts and young performers with special scheduling needs." Students who are especially successful in their careers, such as in ballet, may not go to college after all. A book published in 2005 described scenes at the school that were common with regular schools in terms of the subjects being studied, but with added provisions for remote learning when students were on tour with a production and with the added social comfort of being around other children going through the same experiences.

== Alumni ==
=== Dance ===
- Jerry Ames
- Jared Angle
- Tyler Angle
- Alexandra Ansanelli
- Merrill Ashley
- Debra Austin
- Peter Boal
- Ruthanna Boris
- Ashley Bouder
- Leslie Browne
- Fernando Bujones
- Daniel Duell
- Megan Fairchild
- Robert Fairchild
- Suzanne Farrell
- Eliot Feld
- Savion Glover
- Susan Hendl
- Adam Hendrickson
- Darla Hoover
- Sterling Hyltin
- Allegra Kent
- Gelsey Kirkland
- Darci Kistler
- Maria Kowroski
- Carla Körbes
- Rebecca Krohn
- Lourdes Lopez
- Savannah Lowery
- Nilas Martins
- Steven Melendez
- Colleen Neary
- Kyra Nichols
- Tiler Peck
- SarahAnne Perel
- Susan Pilarre
- Rachel Piskin
- Teresa Reichlen
- Nancy Reynolds
- Carrie Lee Riggins
- Jenifer Ringer
- John Selya
- Jennie Somogyi
- Ethan Stiefel
- Marianna Tcherkassky
- Ashley Tuttle
- Sheryl Ware
- Heather Watts
- Wendy Whelan
- Deborah Wingert

=== Music ===
Students entering school in morning, 2025

- Loni Ackerman
- Anastacia
- Jack Antonoff
- Emanuel Ax
- Jessie Baylin
- Vanessa Carlton
- Kyung Wha Chung
- Dana Dawson
- Peng-Peng Gong
- Andreas Haefliger
- Marvin Hamlisch
- Lorin Hollander
- Caroline Jones
- Ida Kavafian
- Cho-Liang Lin
- Frankie Lymon
- Yo-Yo Ma
- Jack Metzger
- Midori Gotō
- Buddy Rich
- Beverly Sills
- Arlene Smith
- Martha Strongin Katz
- Conrad Tao
- Pinchas Zukerman

=== Theater, film, and television ===
(Front Entrance, 2026)

- Brooke Adams
- Trini Alvarado
- Adam Arkin
- Alex Paez
- Essence Atkins
- Kaye Ballard
- Mischa Barton
- Charita Bauer
- Bonnie Bedelia
- Milton Berle
- Zina Bethune
- Nadia Bjorlin
- Richard H. Blake
- Tempestt Bledsoe
- Joan Blondell
- Ann Blyth
- Laura Bell Bundy
- Eddie Bracken
- Jordana Brewster
- Irene Cara
- Phoebe Cates
- Helen Chandler
- Miles Chapin
- Kathleen Cody
- Holly Marie Combs
- Kieran Culkin
- Macaulay Culkin
- Rory Culkin
- Charlotte d'Amboise
- Alexandra Daddario
- Sandra Dee
- Brandon deWilde
- Barrett Doss
- Giancarlo Esposito
- Donald Faison
- Carrie Fisher
- Anne Francis
- Rebecca Gayheart
- Helen Gallagher
- Sarah Michelle Gellar
- Elliott Gould
- Todd Graff
- Karron Graves
- Lukas Haas
- Albert Hackett
- Anthony Michael Hall
- Huntz Hall
- Patti Hansen
- Melissa Joan Hart
- Amy Irving
- Scarlett Johansson
- Brad Caleb Kane
- Carol Kane
- Ruby Keeler
- Jean Louisa Kelly
- Patsy Kelly
- Jane Krakowski
- Ricki Lake
- Diane Lane
- Jennifer Lien
- Peggy Lipton
- Lorna Luft
- Sidney Lumet
- Barbara Luna
- Ida Lupino
- Helen Mack
- Jena Malone
- Nancy Malone
- Daniel Mann
- Patty McCormack
- Leighton Meester
- Ilan Mitchell-Smith
- Lisa Mordente
- Rita Moreno
- Phyllis Newman
- Jerry O'Connell
- Donald O'Connor
- Jennifer O'Neill
- Sarah Jessica Parker
- Martha Plimpton
- Laura Prepon
- Margaret Qualley
- Martha Raye
- Tara Reid
- Rosemary Rice
- Christina Ricci
- Eden Riegel
- Sam Riegel
- Tanya Rivero
- Christy Carlson Romano
- Rose Marie
- Sara Rue
- Michael Rupert
- Rebecca Schaeffer
- Aaron Schwartz
- Shim Eun-kyung
- Jonathan Silverman
- Penny Singleton
- Christian Slater
- John Spencer
- Julia Stiles
- Susan Strasberg
- Eddie Kaye Thomas
- Jenn Thompson
- Uma Thurman
- Rachel Ticotin
- Ashley Tisdale
- Janine Turner
- Leslie Uggams
- Heidi Vanderbilt
- Dick Van Patten
- Joyce Van Patten
- Christopher Walken
- Nancy Walker
- Malcolm-Jamal Warner
- Lesley Ann Warren
- Tuesday Weld
- Nat Wolff
- Lee Thompson Young

=== Sports ===
- Kristie Ahn
- Carol Heiss
- Reed Kessler
- Sonya Klopfer
- Yvonne Sherman
- Ashima Shiraishi
- Josh Waitzkin

=== Literature ===
- Michael McGarrity
- Linn Ullmann

=== Fashion ===
- Rachel Antonoff
- Claudia Mason
- Vera Wang

== See also ==
- Professional Performing Arts School
- Fiorello H. LaGuardia High School of Music & Art and Performing Arts
