= Who Cares? (ballet) =

Ballet by George Balanchine

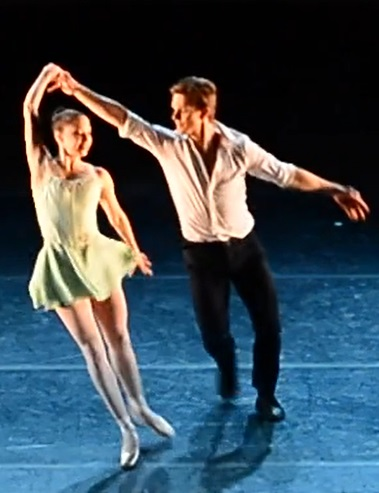
- North Carolina Dance Theatre's Anita Pacylowski and Hernan Justo dancing "The Man I Love " in Who Cares?
- Choreographer: George Balanchine
- Music: George Gershwin
- Premiere: February 5, 1970; New York State Theater
- Original ballet company: New York City Ballet
- Design: Karinska; Jo Mielziner; Ronald Bates
- Genre: Neoclassical ballet

Who Cares? is a ballet choreographed by George Balanchine to songs by George Gershwin that were orchestrated by Hershy Kay. The ballet is split in two parts, the first danced by an ensemble, and the second focuses on four principal dancers. Who Cares? premiered on February 5, 1970, at the New York State Theater, danced by the New York City Ballet.

== Choreography ==
On Who Cares?, original cast member Karin von Aroldingen described, "You think it's so unlike Balanchine, it's so jazzy. One would think he'd just make a jazz ballet out of it, like everyone else, a dance like Broadway, but he put it on pointe – it's sort of like a tap dance on pointe."

The ballet features seventeen songs by Gershwin. The first eight songs are danced by fifteen women and five men. Dance critic Zoe Anderson wrote that this half of the ballet is "staged as a suite of classical dances... with some hoofer steps and showgirl poses." The second half of the ballet focuses on three women and a man. Anderson commented that "the mood turns late-night and more romantic" Each of the dancers has their own solos, and the man dances duets with all three women. This is followed by a quartet, before the full cast returns for the finale.

== Music and original cast ==
Songs	Dancers
"Strike Up the Band"	ensemble
"Sweet and Low Down"	ensemble
"Somebody Loves Me"	Deborah Flomine, Susan Hendl, Linda Merrill, Susan Pilarre, Bettijane Sills
"Bidin' My Time"	Deni Lamont, Robert Maiorano, Frank Ohman, Richard Rapp, Earle Sieveling
"'S Wonderful"	Susan Pilarre, Richard Rapp
"That Certain Feeling"	Deborah Flomine, Deni Lamont, Bettijane Sills, Earle Sieveling
"Do Do Do"	Susan Hendl, Frank Ohman
"Lady Be Good"	Linda Merrill, Robert Maiorano
"The Man I Love"	Patricia McBride, Jacques d'Amboise
"I'll Build a Stairway to Paradise"	Karin von Aroldingen
"Embraceable You"	Marnee Morris, Jacques d'Amboise
"Fascinatin' Rhythm"	Patricia McBride
"Who Cares?"	Karin von Aroldingen, Jacques d'Amboise
"My One and Only"	Marnee Morris
"Liza"	Jacques d'Amboise
"Clap Yo' Hands"	Karin von Aroldingen, Patricia McBride, Marnee Morris, Jacques d'Amboise
"I Got Rhythm"	full cast

The rest of the corps de ballet consist of Rosemary Dunleavy, Suzanne Erlon, Elise Flagg, Gloriann Hicks, Deborah Kooligh, Leslie Peck, Christine Redpath, Polly Shelton, Marilee Stiles and Virginia Stuart.

== Production ==
In his book Balanchine's Complete Stories of the Great Ballets, Balanchine wrote that he became familiar with Gershwin's works while he was still living in Europe in the late 1920s and 1930s. He believed he would not have done musical comedy works in his early choreographic career if it had not been for Gershwin's works. Balanchine and Gershwin worked together on the 1938 film The Goldwyn Follies. While working on the film, Gershwin gave Balanchine a book of his songs arranged in the way he performed them in concerts. During the production of the film, Gershwin died from a brain tumor at age thirty-eight.

Balanchine wrote that he conceived the ballet while playing the songs on the Gershwin songbook, "and thought to myself, Beautiful, I'll make a pas de deux. Then I played another, it was just as beautiful and I thought, A variation! And then another and another and there was no end to how beautiful they are." The title of the ballet came from the eponymous song also used in the ballet, that was written for the musical Of Thee I Sing.

The first section Balanchine choreographed was the titular pas de deux originated by Karin von Aroldingen and Jacques d'Amboise. It was the first role Balanchine made for von Aroldingen. Patricia McBride recalled that Balanchine choreographed both her solo and duet quickly. For the "Fascinatin' Rhythm" solo, she said Balanchine, who was 65, demonstrated all the steps, and danced it better than she could. She rehearsed the solo with a tape recorder many times so she could dance it without counting and "really have fun with it."

Hershy Kay was commissioned to orchestrate the score. The lyrics, all by Ira Gershwin, are not included in the ballet. However, when the ballet premiered, Kay only completed the first song "Strike Up the Band" and the last song "I Got Rhythm", as he was also working on a musical. Therefore, most songs were played on a piano at the premiere, with the exception of "Clap Yo' Hands", using 1926 recording of Gershwin playing the song. The orchestration is complete by May 1970, few months after the ballet's premiere. However, the Gershwin recording of "Clap Yo' Hands" was still used. "Clap Yo' Hands" was removed from the ballet in 1976, but was added back in 2010.

The original costume and lighting were designed by Karinska and Ronald Bates respectively. In November 1970, a New York skyline backdrop designed by Jo Mielziner is added to the ballet. The costumes had since been redesigned several times.

== Performances ==
Who Cares? premiered on February 5, 1970, at the New York State Theater. Since the orchestration of the score was incomplete, Gordon Boelzner played the songs on the piano. Before the premiere, Balanchine was presented the Handel Medallion, New York City's highest cultural award, by mayor John Lindsay.

Other ballet companies that had perform Who Cares? include English National Ballet, Zürich Ballet, San Francisco Ballet, Pacific Northwest Ballet, Atlanta Ballet, Charlotte Ballet (formerly North Carolina Dance Theatre), Sarasota Ballet, Los Angeles Ballet, Cincinnati Ballet, Colorado Ballet and Ballet Chicago. It was also performed on Mikhail Baryshnikov's tour Baryshnikov & Friends. The School of American Ballet, the affiliated-school of the New York City Ballet, had include the ballet in its annual workshop performances.

In 2014, when original cast member Patricia McBride received the Kennedy Center Honor, excerpts of Who Cares? were included in the tribute to McBride. "Fascinatin' Rhythm" was danced by New York City Ballet principal dancer Tiler Peck, and "I Got Rhythm" was danced by four members of Charlotte Ballet, Peck, and other dancers who participated in other segments of the tribute.

== Critical reception ==
Clive Barnes of the New York Times commented, "The ballet is not likely to be regarded as one of Balanchine's major works although it does, not unexpectedly, have some extraordinarily lovely passages in it."

== Videography ==
In 1971, excerpts of Who Cares? was televised by the Canadian Broadcasting Corporation, featuring original cast members Karin von Aroldingen, Patricia McBride and Marnee Morris, as well as Jean-Pierre Bonnefoux.

Excerpts of Who Cares? had also been televised through PBS, including the 1983 Great Performances episode "A New York City Ballet Tribute to George Balanchine", the 1993 Live from Lincoln Center broadcast "The Balanchine Celebration", and the 2004 "Balanchine 100", also on Live from Lincoln Center.

In 1989, a concert performance of Who Cares? was also included in the PBS Dance in America program "Baryshnikov Dances Balanchine With American Ballet Theatre." However, it was danced by the tour Baryshnikov & Friends rather than the American Ballet Theatre. In this program, only half of the ballet is danced, and the corps de ballet is removed. The four lead dancers are Baryshnikov, Christine Dunham, Leslie Browne and Deirdre Carberry.
