= Margaret Severin-Hansen =

American ballerina

- Born: Long Island, New York, U.S.
- Education: School of American Ballet
- Occupation: Ballet dancer
- Years active: 1998–present
- Spouse: Richard Krusch (m. 2018)
- Career
- Current group: Carolina Ballet

Margaret Severin-Hansen is an American ballerina. Since 2002, she has been a principal dancer with the Carolina Ballet. She also serves as the co-chairman of the School of Carolina Ballet, as the Director of the Ruth S. Shur Summer Intensive Program, and is a founding member of the School of American Ballet's Alumni Advisory Committee on Diversity and Inclusion.

== Early life and training ==
Severin-Hansen was born in New York and is of Asian descent. She began her ballet training at the Huntington School of Ballet in Long Island, New York. When she was thirteen, she transferred to the School of American Ballet in Manhattan. In 1997, she trained with the Royal Danish Ballet for six weeks and also performed in the School of American ballet's 33rd Annual Workshop Performance.

== Career ==
In 1998, Severin-Hansen joined the Carolina Ballet as an apprentince in its inaugural season, and was promoted to principal dancer in 2002. She has danced various roles with the company including in Inscapes, Tarantella, A Classical Ballet, and Snow White. Her premier and principal roles with Carolina Ballet include her performances in Giselle, La Sylphide, The Sleeping Beauty, Coppélia, Swan Lake, Romeo and Juliet, The Nutcracker, Messiah, Code of Silence, and Jewels. In 2019, she danced the role of Albatross in Robert Weiss's The Rime of the Ancient Mariner.

In 2009, she was one of eight graduates from the School of American Ballet that were invited by Peter Martins to perform with the New York City Ballet at the 75th Anniversary Celecration of the school. In 2011, she performed as a guest artist with Ballet Mississippi and, in 2012, she performed as a guest artist with South Georgia Ballet. Severin-Hansen performed with the Royal Ballet of Flanders for their 2013–2014 season.

She serves as the director of the Ruth S. Shur Summer Intensive Program and is the co-chairman of the School of Carolina Ballet. Severin-Hansen is also a founding member of the School of American Ballet Alumni Advisory Committee on Diversity and Inclusion and a member of the school's visiting faculty, and serves as assistant director of the Triangle Academy of Dance in Cary.

== Personal life ==
Severin-Hansen married Gabor Kapin, a fellow principal dancer with Carolina Ballet, in 2008.

Divorced Gabor Kapin 2013, married Richard Krusch 2018
