= Ballo della Regina =

- Choreographer: George Balanchine
- Music: Giuseppe Verdi
- Premiere: January 12, 1978; New York State Theater
- Original ballet company: New York City Ballet
- Design: Ben Benson; Ronald Bates
- Created for: Merrill Ashley; Robert Weiss
- Genre: Neoclassical ballet

Ballo della Regina is a ballet choreographed by George Balanchine. Set to the ballet divertissement from Giuseppe Verdi's opera Don Carlos, the Balanchine ballet is plotless but alludes to the grotto setting of the divertissement. The ballet is danced by a lead couple and an all-female ensemble, with choreography that showcases the speed and precision of the lead ballerina. Ballo della Regina was made for the New York City Ballet, and premiered on January 12, 1978, at the New York State Theater, with Merrill Ashley and Robert Weiss in the two lead roles.

== Development ==
Ballo della Regina is set to the Act III ballet divertissement from Giuseppe Verdi's opera Don Carlos, which he had reluctantly included at the request of the Paris Opera, and cut from most subsequent productions of the opera. In the opera, the ballet divertissement was performed in honour of Queen Elizabeth of Spain, who was absent and in her place her lady-in-waiting Princess Eboli, donning a mask, presided over the festivities. The ballet divertissement is set in a grotto and depicts a fisherman discovering the La Peregrina pearl.

Balanchine had choreographed for several Verdi operas early in his career, and told his biographer Bernard Taper, "From Verdi's way of dealing with the chorus, I have learned how to handle the corps de ballet, the ensemble, the soloists, how to make the soloists stand out against the corps, and when to give them a rest." Balanchine made the piano reduction of the music himself as none existed. Aware that the music would be uninteresting for the orchestra, Balanchine apologised to the orchestra and hinted he would use more challenging music for his next ballet, which would be Kammermusik No. 2.

For the lead roles, Balanchine chose Merrill Ashley, recently promoted to principal dancer, and Robert Weiss. Balanchine had spoken to Ashley about a virtuoso role, but she was unaware he was planning for a role for her. She then returned from vacation to find out about her promotion and casting in Ballo della Regina. Debra Austin, Bonita Borne, Stephanie Saland and Sheryl Ware originated the soloist roles. Balanchine choreographed the ballet in a week. Ashley described her experience working on the ballet,

Balanchine was in very good spirits, and I think it was inevitable that he would do something fast for me. He wanted to push me and see how far I could go. He didn't say that to me, but to other people. 'I kept giving her harder things to do, and I couldn't believe she could do it.' There were some things I couldn't do which eventually got changed, but when he makes a ballet for you it's comfortable. He knows how to make one step flow into the next. They're difficult, but you're not forcing your body into an unnatural pattern.

The costumes and lighting, designed by Ben Benson and Ronald Bates respectively, along with the sea-blue backcloth used in the ballet, evoke the grotto setting of the ballet divertissement in Don Carlos. In his will, Balanchine bequeathed the rights to the ballet to Ashley.

== Choreography ==
Ballo della Regina is plotless, and performed by a lead couple, along with an all-female ensemble consisting of four soloists and twelve corps de ballet dancers. It features a prologue, pas de deux, variations for the two lead dancers and four soloists, and a coda.

The ballet was choreographed to highlight Ashley's speed and precision. Balanchine's biographer Bernard Taper described the ballet as "essentially a display piece, spotlighting the bravura talent of Merrill Ashley." Another Balanchine biographer, Jennifer Homans, described the role,

In Ballo [Balanchine] gave [Ashley] some of the most difficult feats ever devised in the classical repertory, yet it wasn't bravura that emerged. It was a kind of muscular physics. The squareness and tension through her shoulders and face dissolved in her mercurial speed, legs slicing, as her torso and hips peeled open with ever extreme torque and an épaulement that spiraled through her limbs and brought her once-studied anatomy to life."

New York Times critic Anna Kisselgoff noted the choreography was also tailored to Weiss' virtuosity, and Weiss said Balanchine took advantage of his speed and jumps. He added, "The qualities that work best in that ballet were qualities that he saw in [Ashley and I]."

Kisselgoff also found that in addition to ballet divertissement from Don Carlos, Balanchine took inspiration from "underwater-pearl" ballets that he became familiar with as a child, such as Saint-Léon's The Little Humpbacked Horse and Petipa's La Perle. According to her, the Verdi score's structure and mood "has given [Balanchine] his cue", and the two lead roles of Ballo della Regina evoke the fisherman and pearl of the opera divertissement.

== Original cast ==
- Merrill Ashley
- Robert Weiss
- Debra Austin
- Bonita Borne
- Stephanie Saland
- Sheryl Ware
- Toni Bentley
- Elise Flagg
- Lauren Hauser
- Lisa Hess
- Nichol Hlinka
- Dolores Houston
- Lourdes Lopez
- Lisa de Ribere
- Leslie Roy
- Lily Samuels
- Noelle Shader
- Sandra Zigars

== Performances ==
Ballo della Regina had a preview performance at a gala benefit in November 1977, before it officially premiered on January 12, 1978, at the New York State Theater. In a performance later that year, Weiss tore his Achilles tendon and Ashley completed the ballet by herself.

Ballo della Regina has also entered the repertory of other ballet companies, including the San Francisco Ballet, Royal Winnipeg Ballet, Cuban National Ballet, Boston Ballet, Miami City Ballet, Pennsylvania Ballet, American Ballet Theatre, Houston Ballet, the Royal Ballet, and Royal Danish Ballet.

== Critical reception ==
Upon the premiere, New York Times critic Anna Kisselgoff wrote that Ballo della Regina "is not a great ballet. It is merely terrific." She added that the ballet "contains some of the most original combinations of steps that Mr. Balanchine has devised in a long time."

== Videography ==
In 1979, Ballo della Regina was televised on PBS's Dance in America, featuring Ashley and Weiss.

In 2020, during the COVID-19 pandemic, the New York City Ballet made an archival video of the ballet featuring Megan Fairchild and Anthony Huxley available online. The Royal Danish Ballet also made a recording of the ballet, featuring Holly Dorger and Jonathan Chmelensky, available to stream.
