= List of Balanchine Trust repetiteurs =

The following is a list of repetiteurs from the Balanchine Trust authorized to stage ballets of George Balanchine.

- Karin von Aroldingen
- Merrill Ashley
- Robert Barnett
- Paul Boos
- Elyse Borne
- Maria Calegari
- John Clifford
- Bart Cook
- Daniel Duell
- Suzanne Farrell
- Judith Fugate
- Nanette Glushak
- Susan Hendl
- Darla Hoover
- Sandra Jennings
- Jillana
- Zippora Karz
- Sean Lavery
- Sara Leland
- Adam Luders
- Miriam Mahdaviani
- Nilas Martins
- Philip Neal
- Colleen Neary
- Patricia Neary
- Susan Pillarre
- Christine Redpath
- Lisa de Ribere
- Francia Russell
- Suki Schorer
- Joysanne Sidimus
- Bettijane Sills
- Victoria Simon
- Diana White
- Deborah Wingert
