= Jim Bywater =

British actor

Jim Bywater (1944-2026) was a British actor, writer and musician who had appeared both in film and television roles. Probably one of his most notable roles was as Wilf Starkey in Coronation Street in 1985. Other television appearances include Bodger and Badger, The Bill, Dalziel and Pascoe and Bulman. His film appearances include the 2009 adaptation of Colette's Chéri.

Bywater was married to the actor, journalist and broadcaster Jeni Barnett. They met in the 1970s working in the left wing agit prop theatre company Belt and Braces.

Jim was a teacher in his early years at St Edwards School Castle Donington, Leicestershire. He also appeared in the 1970s children's TV lunchtime programme, Mr Trimble.

In June 2026, Jeni Barnett confirmed via her blog that Jim Bywater had died on 31 May 2026.
