= Elise Flagg =

American ballet dancer

Elise Flagg (born 1951) is an American ballet dancer who worked with George Balanchine as a dancer at the New York City Ballet .

== Life ==
Elise Flagg was born December 23, 1951, in Detroit, Michigan. Her sister Laura was also a dancer.

In the 1960s and 1970s Flagg danced with the New York City Ballet. She was featured in George Balanchine's Western Symphony, Ivesiana and A Midsummer Night's Dream. She also performed in Richard Tanner's Octuor. After Gelsey Kirkland suffered injury, Flagg danced the Nightingale in Kirkland's place in John Taras' production of Song of the Nightingale at the 1972 Stravinsky Festival. After Kirkland recovered from her injury, Flagg resumed the role of the Mechanical Nightingale opposite her.

Flagg runs a dance academy, the Elise Flagg Academy of Dance. In 2020 the academy moved from West Chicago to a new studio in Geneva, Illinois.

According to her instructor biography on the Midwest Dance Conservatory website, "Elise was born in Detroit to Colonel John Flagg and Miriam Flagg, a music teacher with a trained operatic voice. [...] The family moved to Anchorage, Alaska, where Ms. Flagg started ballet lessons under Linda Lorimer, who suggested that she audition for The School of American Ballet (SAB) in New York City. At the age of twelve, Ms. Flagg was selected by George Balanchine to attend SAB with a Ford Foundation Scholarship.

Elise spent the next four years training at SAB. She [studied] with Alexandra Danilova, Felia Doubrovska, Pierre Vladimarov, and Stanley Williams. Later on in her career, she studied with David Howard, Rudolf Nureyev, and George Balanchine.

At sixteen, Ms. Flagg joined the New York City Ballet, where she spent the next nine years advancing from corps de ballet to soloist. She danced solo and principal roles with the New York City Ballet until the time she left to join the Zurich Ballet as a principal artist. Principal roles Ms. Flagg performed include Giselle, Don Quixote (with Rudolf Nureyev), Swan Lake, A Midsummer Night's Dream, George Balanchine's The Nutcracker, Serenade, Symphony in C, Jewels, Agon, Square Dance, Episodes, La Sonnambula, Apollo, and Concerto Barocco, among numerous others. Ms. Flagg's partners include Rudolf Nureyev, Edward Villella, Peter Schaufuss, John Clifford, Robert Weiss, Maximiliano Guerra, and Jonas Kage.

Ms. Flagg achieved pilates certification with Romana and Juanita Lopez at the Chicago Pilates Studio."
