= SarahAnne Perel =

American ballerina

- Education: School of American Ballet; Professional Children's School; Duke University (BA)
- Occupation: Ballet dancer
- Career
- Current group: Miami City Ballet
- Former groups: Carolina Ballet; Los Angeles Ballet

SarahAnne Perel is an American ballerina. Since 2024, she has danced with the Miami City Ballet as a member of the corps de ballet. Perel was formerly a dancer with Carolina Ballet and Los Angeles Ballet.

== Early life, education, and training ==
Perel grew up in New York. From 2004 to 2014, she attended the School of American Ballet. During her time as a student at the School of American Ballet, she performed with the New York City Ballet in productions of The Nutcracker, Coppélia, and Circus Polka and attended summer intensives at San Francisco Ballet, Miami City Ballet, and Pacific Northwest Ballet. Perel studied under Suzanne Farrell at the John F. Kennedy Center for the Performing Arts in Washington, D.C. for three summers.

She graduated from the School of American Ballet and the Professional Children's School in 2014.

She earned a bachelor of arts degree from Duke University, where she majored in international and comparative studies and minored in dance and Spanish language. While in school, she participated in American Ballet Theatre's residency at Duke University as well as Alonzo King / LINES Ballet's and Ballet X's residencies. She was a recipient of the Clay Taliaferro Award in 2018 and the Julia Wray Award in 2020 from Duke's dance department.

She served as the artistic director of Devils en Pointe, a student-run ballet organization at Duke University, and performed in the organization's productions of The Nutcracker, The Sleeping Beauty, La Bayadère, and Pandora's Box.

== Career ==
In 2014, Perel joined the corps de ballet at Los Angeles Ballet and danced with the company until 2018. While dancing with Los Angeles Ballet, she performed in works by George Balanchine, Sir Frederick Ashton, Colleen Neary, and Thordal Christensen including Don Quixote, Romeo and Juliet, and Tchaikovsky Piano Concerto No. 2. She danced the Rose lead in Waltz of the Flowers with Los Angeles Ballet at the Dolby Theatre. She also taught ballet at the Los Angeles Ballet School.

In 2018, upon invitation by ballet mistress Debra Austin, she joined Carolina Ballet as a guest artist. In 2020, she joined the corps de ballet at Carolina Ballet. She danced in Carolina Ballet's production of The Nutcracker for three seasons and performed in Swan Lake and George Balanchine's Serenade. While dancing at Carolina Ballet, she also worked as a dance teacher at Triangle Day School and Barriskill Dance Theater School in Durham, North Carolina and tutored Spanish-speaking students at Durham School of the Arts.

In 2023, she was featured in Dance Magazine.

In 2024, she joined the corps de ballet at Miami City Ballet. In November 2024, she performed in Miami City Ballet's A Midsummer Night's Dream as a member of Queen Tatiana's retinue.
