= Chéri (2009 film) =

Romantic comedy-drama film by Stephen Frears

- UK theatrical release poster
- Directed by: Stephen Frears
- Screenplay by: Christopher Hampton
- Based on: Chéri and The Last of Chéri by Colette
- Produced by: Andras Hamori; Tracey Seaward; Thom Mount; Bill Kenwright
- Starring: Michelle Pfeiffer; Rupert Friend; Felicity Jones; Kathy Bates
- Cinematography: Darius Khondji
- Edited by: Lucia Zucchetti
- Music by: Alexandre Desplat
- Production companies: BKL Films; Pathé; UK Film Council; Aramid Entertainment
- Distributed by: Pathé Distribution (France); Warner Bros. Entertainment UK (United Kingdom); Prokino Filmverleih (Germany)
- Release dates: 10 February 2009 (Berlinale); 8 April 2009 (France); 8 May 2009 (United Kingdom); 27 August 2009 (Germany)
- Running time: 92 minutes
- Countries: France; United Kingdom; Germany
- Language: English
- Budget: $23 million
- Box office: $9.4 million

Chéri is a 2009 romantic comedy-drama film directed by Stephen Frears from a screenplay by Christopher Hampton, based on the 1920 novel of the same name and its 1926 sequel The Last of Chéri by French author Colette. It stars Michelle Pfeiffer and Rupert Friend. The film premiered at the 59th Berlin International Film Festival.

== Plot ==
In 1900s Paris, wealthy, middle-aged retired courtesan Léa starts an affair with Fred, nicknamed Cheri ("Dear" or "Darling"), the 19-year-old only son of another even wealthier courtesan. A famous beauty, Léa has been successful at extracting large sums of money from her up-scale clients, never falling in love with any of them.

At first, Léa takes Chéri off her "friend" (and former rival) Charlotte's hands as a favor, as his dissipated lifestyle is irritating to Charlotte and unhealthy for Chéri. Although Léa only plans on keeping Chéri around for a short while, their affair turns into a six-year relationship, in which Léa pays for Chéri's expenses, (although he has access to considerable wealth from his mother) and Chéri wears Léa's silk pajamas and pearls. Although they satisfy each other both sexually and emotionally, the two convince themselves that their affair is casual, but they are the only real friend the other has. Her status as a former prostitute and his as the son of one make them outsiders who can only be fully honest and relaxed together.

Léa learns Chéri's mother has arranged for him to marry the daughter of another courtesan, 18-year-old Edmée, as Charlotte has decided she wants grandchildren, largely to make up for her years of neglecting Chéri. Despite not wishing to marry Edmée, whom he finds boring, Chéri has no choice as he stands to inherit a fortune from Charlotte. Léa cheerfully kicks him out of her home but makes Chéri promise to always be gentle and kind with Edmée and to try to give her a good life. After Chéri agrees, the two part ways, both putting on an air of unconcern, as much to convince themselves as the rest of the world that their affair had just been for amusement.

Léa does not attend the wedding, and Chéri and Edmée leave for their honeymoon. It is only after Chéri is on the train to Italy for his honeymoon that both he and Léa realise they are in love with each other. Chéri consummates his marriage with Edmée, but their lovemaking is perfunctory; Edmée is in love with Chéri, but he cannot summon any emotion for her. Léa visits Charlotte before running off on vacation, making up a story in which she is involved with another suitor, when in fact the only man Léa beds while on vacation is a young bodybuilder whom she has no feelings for and regards as a one-night stand.

Meanwhile, Edmée accuses Chéri of not caring about her and says all he ever does is think of Léa. While out on the town with a friend, Chéri is tempted to try opium and cocaine, but declines. On his way home, he notices that Léa's apartment is no longer empty and she has returned home. Comforted by this fact, Chéri runs home to Edmée where he has sex with her properly and kindly, thinking that he can now live in peace, juggling both women. He sends Charlotte the next day to investigate Léa's homelife, whereupon Léa claims she is in love with her new "suitor", and Charlotte tells her that Chéri and Edmée are likewise in love and happier than ever. That night, jealous and wanting to confront Léa about her new suitor, Chéri breaks into her home and admits he loves her. They have sex, and plan on running away together.

In the morning, however, Chéri notices the wrinkles on Léa's face in the light of day, and she sees his doubt. She apologizes to Chéri for "ruining him" and making life too easy on him when they first began their affair. Léa tells Chéri to go back to Edmée, for their age difference would always prevent a true relationship from blossoming between them. Tentatively, Chéri leaves as Léa watches, hoping he will turn back. Both crestfallen and elated by a new sense of freedom, he walks on, as Léa stares into her mirror at her aging face.

Years later, Chéri goes through World War I without a scratch but realises that Léa was the only woman he could ever love, and commits suicide.

== Cast ==
- Michelle Pfeiffer as Léa de Lonval
- Rupert Friend as Fred 'Chéri' Peloux
- Kathy Bates as Madame Charlotte Peloux
- Felicity Jones as Edmée
- Frances Tomelty as Rose
- Anita Pallenberg as La Copine
- Harriet Walter as La Loupiote
- Bette Bourne as Baronne
- Tom Burke as Vicomte Desmond
- Iben Hjejle as Marie Laure
- Toby Kebbell as Patron
- Nichola McAuliffe as Madame Aldonza
- Rollo Weeks as Guido
- Jim Bywater as Clerk
- Jack Walker as Monsieur Roland
- Natasha Cashman as Madame Roland

== Release ==
Chéri premiered in the main competition section of the 59th Berlin International Film Festival. The film was released theatrically in France on 8 April 2009 by Pathé Distribution and in the United Kingdom on 8 May 2009 by Pathé's distribution partner Warner Bros. Entertainment UK, marking the first film released under the then-recent theatrical distribution deal between the two companies.

The film was released on DVD in the United Kingdom on 21 September 2009 by 20th Century Fox Home Entertainment. As of 2021, Warner Bros. Home Entertainment is currently re-releasing Pathé's film library in the United Kingdom.

== Reception ==
On the review aggregator website Rotten Tomatoes, the film holds an approval rating of 52% based on 137 reviews, with an average rating of 5.7/10. The website's critics consensus reads, "A too-short script and a romance lacking in heat detracts from an otherwise haughty charmer." Metacritic, which uses a weighted average, assigned the film a score of 63 out of 100, based on 27 critics, indicating "generally favorable reviews".

Stephen Dalton of The Times reviewed the film favourably, describing Hampton's screenplay as a "steady flow of dry quips and acerbic one-liners" and Pfeiffer's performance as "magnetic and subtle, her worldly nonchalance a mask for vulnerability and heartache."

Roger Ebert of the Chicago Sun-Times wrote that it was "fascinating to observe how Pfeiffer controls her face and voice during times of painful hurt."

Kenneth Turan of the Los Angeles Times praised the "wordless scenes that catch Léa unawares, with the camera alone seeing the despair and regret that she hides from the world. It's the kind of refined, delicate acting Pfeiffer does so well, and it's a further reminder of how much we've missed her since she's been away."
