= Holly Dorger =

American ballet dancer

- Born: Holly Jean Dorger; 1989 (age 36–37)
- Citizenship: American
- Education: School of American Ballet
- Occupation: Ballet dancer
- Years active: 2008-present
- Dancing career
- Current group: Royal Danish Ballet
- Dances: Ballet
- Website: www.hollydorger.com

Holly Jean Dorger (born 1989) is an American ballet dancer. She is a principal dancer at the Royal Danish Ballet.

== Early life ==
Dorger's first dance training was Scottish highland dance. She was the U.S. Champion at age 10. Soon, she shifted her focus on ballet. In 2004, at age 14, Dorger started training at the School of American Ballet on full scholarship. She was trained by former New York City Ballet principal dancer Nikolaj Hubbe.

== Career ==
In 2008, at age 18, Dorger joined the Royal Danish Ballet in Copenhagen as a member of the corps de ballet, at the invitation of Hubbe, now the artistic director of the company. Dorger, who was trained with the Balanchine technique, had to adjust to the company's Bournonville method when she first joined, though she did have opportunities to dance Balanchine's works. While she was in the corp, she danced soloist roles such as Princess Florine in The Sleeping Beauty, Gamzatti in La Bayadere and Dew Drop in The Nutcracker.

In 2013, Dorger was named soloist. In 2016, she was promoted to the rank of principal dancer after dancing Balanchine's Theme and Variations. She has danced principal roles such as Odette/Odile in Swan Lake, the title role in Giselle and Teresina in Napoli, Balanchine repertoire such as Ballo della Regina and contemporary works such as Alice in Alice’s Adventures in Wonderland. Dorger has also danced in different international galas.

In 2016, Dorger was knighted Ridder af Dannebrogordenen by Queen Margrethe II of Denmark. She is also a co-director of the Opus1 Scandinavia Foundation in Nairobi, Kenya.

== Selected repertoire ==
- Odette/Odile, Pas de trois & Pas de quatre, Swan Lake
- Giselle, Giselle
- Alice & Queen of Hearts, Alice’s Adventures in Wonderland
- Teresina & Pas de Six, Napoli
- Lead Ballerina, Ballo della Regina
- "Diamond",Jewels
- Lead Ballerina, Theme and Variations
- Ballerina, Etudes
- Sugar Plum Fairy, Dew Drop, & Lead Marzipan, The Nutcracker
- Tchaikovsky Pas de Deux
- Henriette, Raymonda
- Mistress, Manon
- Polyhymnia, Apollo
- Gamzatti & shade, La Bayadere
- Mercedes & Dryad Queen, Don Quixote
- Prudence Duvernoy, Lady of the Camelias
- Lilac Fairy & Princess Florine, The Sleeping Beauty
- Pas de trois, Agon
- "America", West Side Story Suite
- Lavinia & Luciana, Romeo and Juliet
- Soloist dancer, Viscera
- First and Second Movement Demi-soloist, Symphony in C
- Don Quixote Grand Pas de Deux
- Raymonda Grand Pas de Deux
- Harlequinade Pas de Deux
- Coppélia Pas de Deux
- La Sylphide pas de deux

=== Created roles ===
- Schubart Pas de Deux
- Pauline, Queen of Spades
- Daisy Friis, Blixen
