= A Portrait of Giselle =

1982 film

- Directed by: Muriel Balash
- Produced by: Joseph Wishy
- Starring: Patricia McBride, Anton Dolin
- Production companies: ABC Video Enterprises; Wishupon
- Distributed by: Alpha Repertory Television Service
- Release date: 1982
- Countries: United States; Canada
- Language: English

A Portrait of Giselle is a 1982 documentary film, produced by Joseph Wishy and directed by Muriel Balash. It features Patricia McBride and Anton Dolin along with famous ballerinas who danced the role of Giselle in the past. It was nominated for an Academy Award for Best Documentary Feature.

== Cast ==
- Alicia Alonso as Herself
- Yvette Chauvire as Herself
- Sir Anton Dolin as Himself
- Carla Fracci as Herself
- Alexander Godunov as Himself
- Tamara Karsavina as Herself
- Natalia Makarova as Herself
- Dame Alicia Markova as Herself
- Patricia McBride as Herself
- Olga Spessivtzeva as Herself
- Galina Ulanova as Herself
