= Aage Thordal-Christensen =

Danish dancer and choreographer

Aage Thordal-Christensen (born October 30, 1965) is a Danish dancer, choreographer and ballet director.

Thordal-Christensen and his wife Colleen Neary are founding directors of Los Angeles Ballet. He has directed the ballet since 2006.

Thordal-Christensen was the artistic director of the Royal Danish Ballet 1999-2002.
