= Kammermusik No. 2 (ballet) =

Ballet choreographed by George Balanchine

- Choreographer: George Balanchine
- Music: Paul Hindemith
- Premiere: January 26, 1978; New York State Theater
- Original ballet company: New York City Ballet
- Genre: Neoclassical ballet

Kammermusik No. 2 is a ballet choreographed by George Balanchine to Paul Hindemith's music of the same name. The ballet premiered on January 26, 1978, at the New York State Theater, danced by the New York City Ballet.

== Production ==
Balanchine's last ballet, Ballo della Regina, was not challenging for the orchestra, so he told the musicians his next ballet would be set to a more complex score, Hindemith's Kammermusik No. 2, for solo piano and twelve solo instruments. It features two lead couples, originated by Karin von Aroldingen, Sean Lavery, Colleen Neary, Adam Lüders, and a corps de ballet of eight men, which is an unusual feature. Therefore, the ballet had been referred to as an inverted Concerto Barocco. The costumes were designed by Ben Benson, and the original lighting was by Ronald Bates.

Kammermusik No. 2 was described by Balanchine's biographer Bernard Taper as "one of the most ingenious and technically accomplished ballets Balanchine had made, and one of his least ingratiating." Karin von Aroldingen, one of the original cast members, called the ballet "Kammer-computer" as it is "speedy." She added, "even the pianist can't play the notes. It took us forever to learn it. The movement is very angular, very fast. If you lose concentration for one second, you ruin it all." Sean Lavery, another original cast member, believed that Balanchine "knew exactly what the corps were doing when the principals were doing something else. He was so fast, so in tune with the music, so ahead of himself, that we couldn't keep up with him."

Following Balanchine's death, the rights to Kammermusik No. 2 and five other ballets went to von Aroldingen.

== Original cast ==
- Karin von Aroldingen
- Sean Lavery
- Colleen Neary
- Adam Lüders
- John Bass
- Joseph Duell
- Peter Frame
- Kipling Houston
- Jay Jolley
- Laurance Matthews
- Peter Neumann
- Francis Sackett

== Performances ==
Kammermusik No. 2 premiered on January 26, 1978, at the New York State Theater, with Robert Irving conducting and the piano played by Gordon Boelzner. The company does not revive the ballet as often as other ballets. It has been revived by Los Angeles Ballet, Boston Ballet and Louisville Ballet.

== Critical reception ==
Following the premiere, New York Times critic Anna Kisselgoff commented that Kammermusik No. 2 "confirms again that no other choreographer today works on the same high conceptual level as Mr. Balanchine." Reviewing a performance six years later, she wrote that it "remains as startling and jarring as ever ... it will never become an audience favorite."
