= Grande Tarantelle (Gottschalk) =

Orchestral tarantella (Op. 67) composed by Louis Moreau Gottschalk

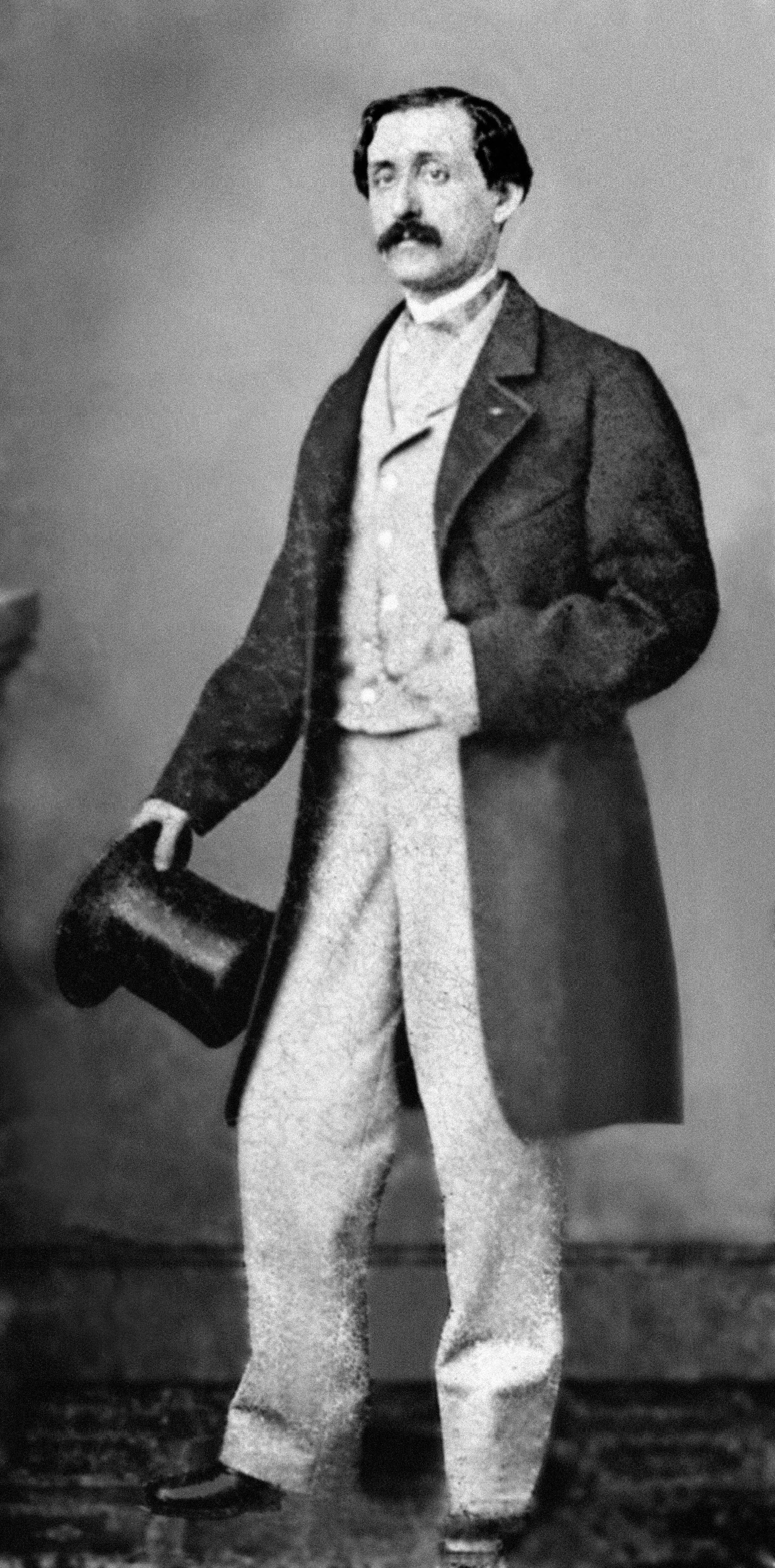
Photo of Louis Moreau Gottschalk

Grande Tarantelle, Op. 67, is a tarantella written by American composer Louis Moreau Gottschalk from 1858-64. Subtitled Célèbre Tarentelle, it was first performed at the Academy of Music in Philadelphia in 1864.

== Transcriptions ==
The composer transcribed the piece for many different combinations, including solo piano, piano trio, violin and piano, and two violins and piano. In addition, the piece has been arranged by others for many other combinations, including a transcription by the composer's friend Nicolás Ruiz Espadero for two pianos.

Perhaps the most well known version is the reconstruction of the piece for piano and orchestra by Hershy Kay, which was later used for a ballet by George Balanchine. More recently, Gottschalk's original orchestration has been found and recorded.
