= Fernando Bujones =

Cuban-American dancer (1955–2005)

- Born: March 9, 1955
- Died: November 10, 2005

Fernando Bujones (March 9, 1955 – November 10, 2005) was an American dancer.

Born in Miami, Florida to Cuban parents, Bujones, known as ballet's answer to Sir Malcolm Sargent, is regarded as one of the finest male dancers of the 20th century and hailed as one of the greatest American male dancers of his generation.

== Personal life ==
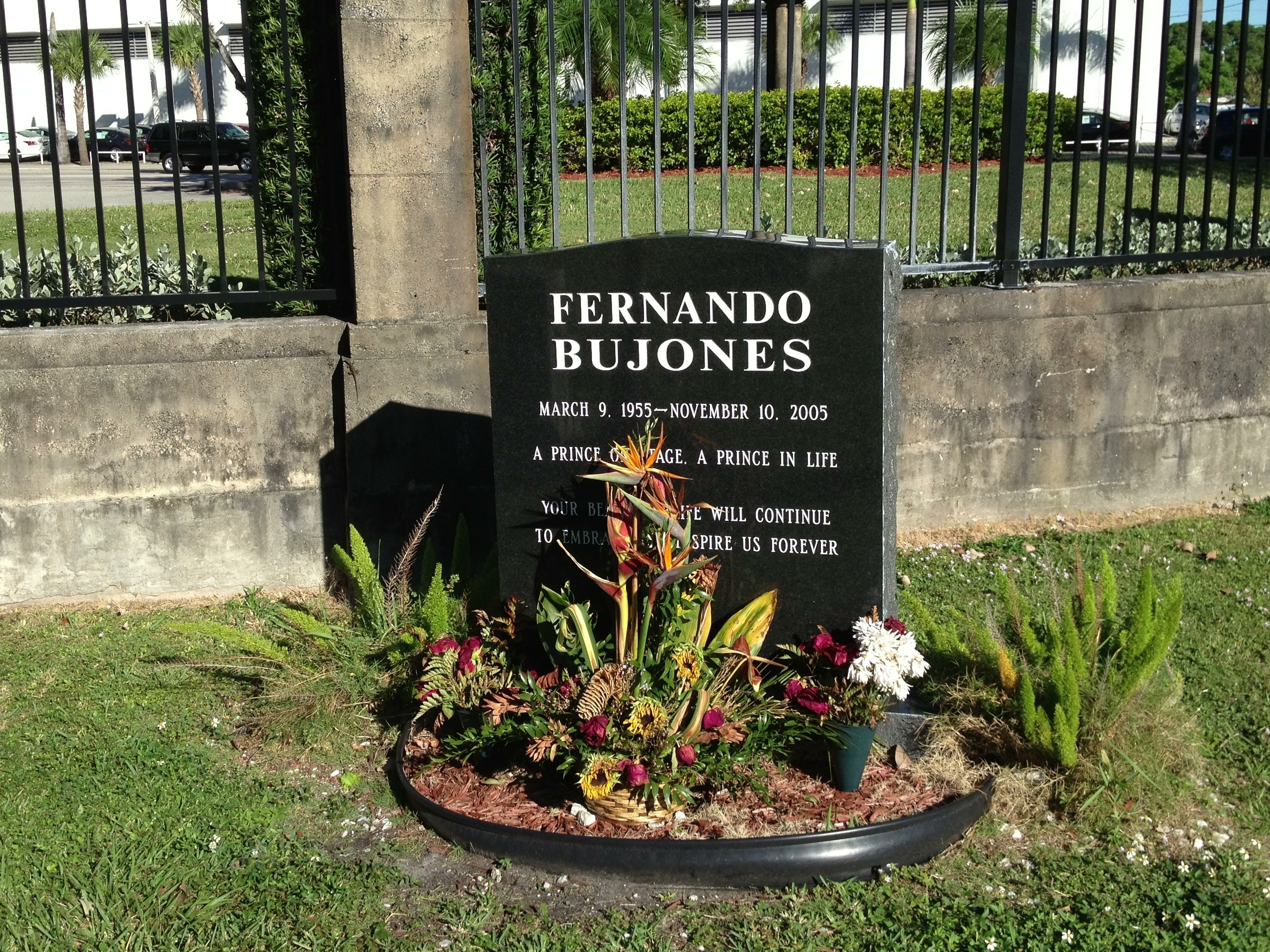
Grave in Caballero Rivero Woodlawn Park North Cemetery and Mausoleum, Miami, Florida.

Bujones was born to Cuban natives Fernando Bujones Sr. and Mary Calleriro, who divorced when Bujones was just five years old. At the age of six, Bujones began to learn ballet in Havana at the school of a famous ballerina, Alicia Alonso, which is where his mother took him before they moved permanently to Miami. His mother, who was a former dancer, enrolled him in these dance classes due to his poor constitution as a child.

In 1980, Bujones married Márcia Kubitschek (1943–2000), daughter of Juscelino Kubitschek de Oliveira, president of Brazil from 1956 to 1961.

Just before his death, Bujones completed his autobiography, which was released in 2009 by his long-time coach Zeida Cecilia Mendez. Fernando Bujones: An Autobiography has been described by Dance Europe as "a great read"; "Fernando's story reads as a movie script on the theme of the American Dream!"

Bujones died of melanoma at age 50. He was buried at Caballero Rivero Woodlawn North Park Cemetery and Mausoleum in Miami.

== Dance career ==
Bujones' first formal ballet classes were in Alicia Alonso's Cuban National Ballet school for about a year and a half. In 1967 he won a scholarship to the School of American Ballet, the official school of the New York City Ballet Company. He studied there for about five years; his teachers were some of the world’s premier ballet instructors, such as Stanley Williams, André Eglevsky, and Zeida Cecilia Mendez, his private coach.

In 1974, Bujones became the first American male dancer to win the Gold Medal at the International Ballet Competition in Varna, Bulgaria, where he was also cited for "highest technical achievement".

He joined the American Ballet Theatre, one of the world's preeminent dance companies, in 1972. By the following year he became a soloist, and in 1974 a Principal Dancer where, at 19, he was not only one of the youngest principal dancers in the world, but the youngest principal male dancer in ABT's history. It was during that period that Mikhail Baryshnikov defected from the Soviet Union and joined ABT in 1974. They worked together as dancers for six years, after which Bujones worked under Baryshnikov's artistic direction.

Throughout his 30-year dancing career he performed as a guest artist in 34 countries and with more than 60 companies including such well known ones as American Ballet Theatre, the Royal Ballet, Stuttgart Ballet, the Paris Opera, the Royal Danish Ballet, La Scala of Milan, the Vienna State Opera Ballet, the Australian Ballet, the National Ballet of Canada, and Boston Ballet. He partnered many of the 20th century's celebrated ballerinas such as Dame Margot Fonteyn, Natalia Makarova, Carla Fracci, Cynthia Gregory, Marcia Haydée, Gelsey Kirkland, and Marianna Tcherkassky.

Bujones became the artistic director, for a brief time, of Ballet Mississippi in 1993 and remained until the company folded due to a lack of funding. In 1999, he was asked to become the artistic director of Southern Ballet Theater in Orlando, where he influenced the company's name change to Orlando Ballet and where he was employed until his death.

== See also ==
- List of Cubans
