= Patrick Bissell =

American ballet dancer

- Patrick Bissell and Galina Samsova dancing the lead roles at the premiere of Cheri at the 1980 Edinburgh Festival.
- Born: Walter Patrick Bissell; December 1, 1957; Corpus Christi, Texas, U.S.
- Died: December 29, 1987 (aged 30); Hoboken, New Jersey, U.S.
- Cause of death: Drug overdose
- Occupation: Ballet dancer
- Years active: 1977–1987
- Height: 6 ft 2 in (1.88 m)
- Spouse: Jolinda Menendez (m. 1982; div. 1983)

Walter Patrick Bissell (December 1, 1957 – December 29, 1987) was an American ballet dancer. He was a leading principal dancer with the American Ballet Theatre. On his death at age 30 from a drug overdose, he was described by the artistic director of the American Ballet Theatre and personal ballet eminence Mikhail Baryshnikov as "without a doubt one of the brightest lights in American Ballet Theater's history, or, for that matter, in the entire ballet world". Bissell was noted for his height, charisma, beauty and athleticism. His most famous role was as Solor in La Bayadère. His death prompted investigations into the alleged widespread drug use within the American Ballet Theatre.

== Early years ==
Bissell was born on December 1, 1957, in Corpus Christi, Texas. He was one of the five children of Donald and Patricia (whom he was named after) Bissell; his siblings included his fraternal twin brother William, two sisters Susan and Barbara, and brother Donald. The family lived in Palos Park, Illinois for several years. His father was a computer-systems designer with Hiram Walker Inc.

Bissell was a natural athlete at even the youngest age who enjoyed performing feats of daring: at the age of 8 he jumped off a 30-foot (9.1 m)-high diving board, even though he did not know how to swim. He dabbled in many sports— baseball, basketball, football, track, etc. He was the pitcher on the baseball team, the center on the basketball team. The coaches gave him an option—either quit sports or quit dance. He gave up athletics in favor of ballet. He was introduced to ballet at age ten by his older sister Susan, who practiced it before he did. She paid him to be her ballet partner; thus he was first paid to dance. While she went on to be a sail-maker and live on a boat, he went on to pursue ballet professionally. He found a home and sanctuary in the passion of ballet and decided to make it his life pursuit. He began training in ballet and jazz dance and was soon accepted into a company in Toledo, Ohio. Like many boys who take up ballet, he tried to keep his lessons a secret, but word got out and he was ridiculed and bullied every single day for the rest of his school days. "I was a skinny kid. They could have crushed me in an instant," he stated.

While Bissell showed early promise as a dancer, he also showed signs of being a troubled young man. He was started with alcohol at age 10, progressing to heavy drugs at 14. He was expelled from his first school for dealing drugs on the premises. He was noticed by the American ballet dancer Edward Villella, who encouraged his parents to send him to a performing arts boarding school. In 1972 he joined the National Academy of Dance in Champaign, Illinois, from which he was dismissed for behavior problems. Bissell then spent a year at the North Carolina School of the Arts which he left when he was informed that he should pay more attention to his academic studies. He hitch-hiked all the way to New York to pursue a lifelong career in dance— as that's where the company's top schools are. He then won a scholarship to study at the School of American Ballet, where he was encouraged by Lincoln Kirstein, its founder, and Stanley Williams, one of his teachers. In 1975, he joined the Boston Ballet, where he danced briefly. He was invited to join Balanchine's New York City Ballet and the American Ballet Theatre. He decided to join ABT and became a member of the corps. Though he quickly rose through the ranks due to the shortage of men in the company. Wherever Bissell went, he attracted attention, both from his fiery dancing and his habit of wearing a cowboy hat and cowboy boots around New York City-—his way of distinguishing he was a true-blue native Texan. He also made his way around the city on a motorcycle.

He danced the lead roles in three of the four ballets performed by the school in its annual workshop and graduated in 1977. He became a good friend of Mikhail Baryshnikov, who praised his dancing.

== Career ==
Bissell joined the corps de ballet of the American Ballet Theatre in 1977, and after three months there, he danced the lead male role in La Bayadère. He moved to the Boston Ballet but returned the following year. In 1978, he was promoted to soloist and to principal dancer in 1979 at the American Ballet Theatre due to the shortage of men in the company—even making the cover of Dance Magazine. The ballerinas nicknamed him "Tarzan," as he was a huge, hulking juggernaut of a man who could carry some of the biggest and tallest girls in the company. For much of his career, however, Bissell was plagued with injuries, and there were reports of drug and alcohol problems. Bissell and Gelsey Kirkland were dismissed from the American Ballet Theatre in 1980 and 1981 on the grounds of chronic lateness and missed rehearsals—in particular for failing to attend a dress rehearsal on the eve of the company's opening at the Kennedy Center in Washington, D.C., on December 9, 1980. Bissell and Kirkland then appeared as guest artists with the Eglevsky Ballet in its production of Act II of Giselle in 1982 at the Hofstra Playhouse in Hempstead, Long Island, New York. Subsequently Bissell rejoined the American Ballet Theatre.

He appeared in many lead roles, including Don Jose in Roland Petit's Carmen, Franz in Coppélia, Basil and Espada in Don Quixote, Albrecht in Giselle, Romeo in Romeo and Juliet, Prince Siegfried in Swan Lake, James in La Sylphide, Prince Desire in Sir Kenneth MacMillan's Sleeping Beauty and lead roles in George Balanchine's Stravinsky Violin Concerto, Symphonie Concertante and Theme and Variations. He created the role of the Prince in Mikhail Baryshnikov's production of Cinderella, the leading male role in Antony Tudor's The Tiller in the Fields (1978), Glen Tetley's Contredances (1979), the title role of Peter Darrell's Chéri (1980) and the lead role in Lynne Taylor-Corbett's Estuary (1983). In 1984, Bissell starred as a guest artist with the Universal Ballet Company in its first production, Adrienne Dellas's Cinderella. He was partnered by its leading ballerina and general director, Julia Moon. He also performed as a guest artist with the National Ballet of Canada, Scottish Ballet and Pacific Northwest Ballet.

== Personal life ==
Bissell married Jolinda Menendez, a former American Ballet Theatre ballerina (she danced two roles in the Baryshnikov Nutcracker) and principal ballerina with the Pennsylvania Ballet, on June 26, 1982, at the Fifth Avenue Presbyterian Church. Patrick was unfaithful throughout the engagement and marriage. The marriage ended after a year due to Bissell's many philanderings and erratic behavior.

He first met Gelsey Kirkland at the ABT when the two were partnered for the world premiere of The Tiller in the Fields in December 1978 and they began a romance. Kirkland states in her 1986 autobiography, Dancing on my Grave, that they started using cocaine together, which developed into cocaine dependency. She states: "I was his drug partner"

=== Drug use and death ===
Bissell started using drugs at a very young age, including shooting up with heroin, and consumed large amounts throughout the course of his life. He started drinking at age ten and was shooting up heroin by thirteen. Because of this, he developed great tolerance. His ferocious appetite for drugs allowed him to show stellar results and tackle his roles with almost no rehearsal. He was arrested in 1981 in Bloomington, Indiana, and charged with public intoxication, disorderly conduct and pushing a policeman. He initially given a 30-day jail sentence and fined $100. However, a plea bargain was made whereby the judge ordered him to arrange to give a performance at Indiana University with the proceeds to be given to charity.

In 1984, company officials from the American Ballet Theatre consulted with experts on drug addiction and found a therapist for him. The following year, a condition of his continued employment by the company was that he undergo regular urine tests. The tests were held weekly with results 95 percent negative, however lapses were only penalized with fines.

In 1987, he spent five weeks at the Betty Ford Clinic in California for intensive therapy, completing the treatment in August. Prior to entering the clinic he had injured his foot and was thus prevented from going on the American Ballet Theatre's fall tour. Around the holidays that year, he was so broke he had to borrow money for groceries.

Bissell was found dead at his apartment in Hoboken, New Jersey on December 29, 1987 at the age of 30. At the time of his death, he was engaged to fellow dancer at the American Ballet Theatre, soloist Amy Rose, and had planned to rejoin the company the following month.

The results of an autopsy showed that he died from an overdose of cocaine, codeine, methadone and other drugs. No paraphernalia was found. It never was determined whether Bissell's death was a deliberate suicide. His body was found lying on the couch, fully dressed. His death prompted charges of extensive drug use in the dance world by Bissell's parents and fellow-dancer Gelsey Kirkland.

His mother, Patricia, said that she blamed his death on the "drug epidemic" in the dance world. She was quoted as saying: "'I've been backstage at dance performances -- have you? I've seen the Kleenex boxes and the cocaine noses. He told me he'd been shooting cocaine into his veins since he was 14, while he was at the North Carolina School of the Arts.'Kirkland's autobiography Dancing on My Grave mentions Bissell's frequent use of cocaine and, when discussing her own addiction, she alleged that he had introduced her to the drug.

Attention was also drawn to the drug therapy program offered by the American Ballet Theatre. According to the company's executive director, Charles Dillingham, Bissell had been participating in the therapy program instituted by the company and had "appeared to have been making progress" prior to his death. Gelsey Kirkland alleged that Bissell's death was "an unavoidable tragedy caused at least in part by the failure of the ballet world and American Ballet Theater in particular to acknowledge and deal openly with the drug problem", which contrasted with Dillingham's statement that "his death came as an utterly horrible surprise". The 1988 production of La Bayadère by the American Ballet Theatre was dedicated to Bissell who had been notable in the role of Solor.
