= Patricia McBride =

American ballet dancer (born 1942)

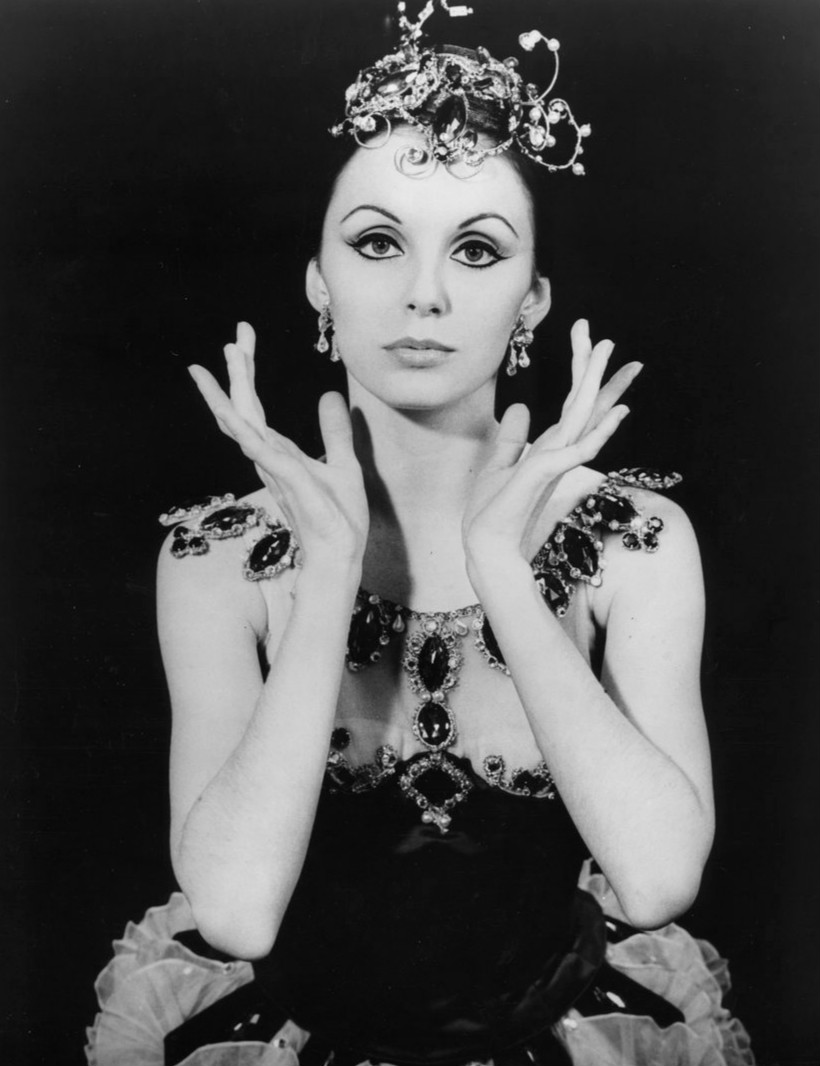
- McBride in Balanchine's Jewels, 1967
- Born: August 23, 1942 (age 84); Teaneck, New Jersey
- Occupations: Ballerina, teacher
- Years active: 1959–1989
- Spouse: Jean-Pierre Bonnefoux
- Children: Melanie Bonnefoux-DeCoudres, Christopher Bonnefoux
- Awards: Kennedy Center Honors, 2014

Patricia McBride (born August 23, 1942) is a ballerina who spent nearly 30 years dancing with New York City Ballet. McBride joined the company in 1959 and became its youngest principal in 1961. During her time with City Ballet, choreographers George Balanchine and Jerome Robbins created roles for her.

== New York City Ballet career ==
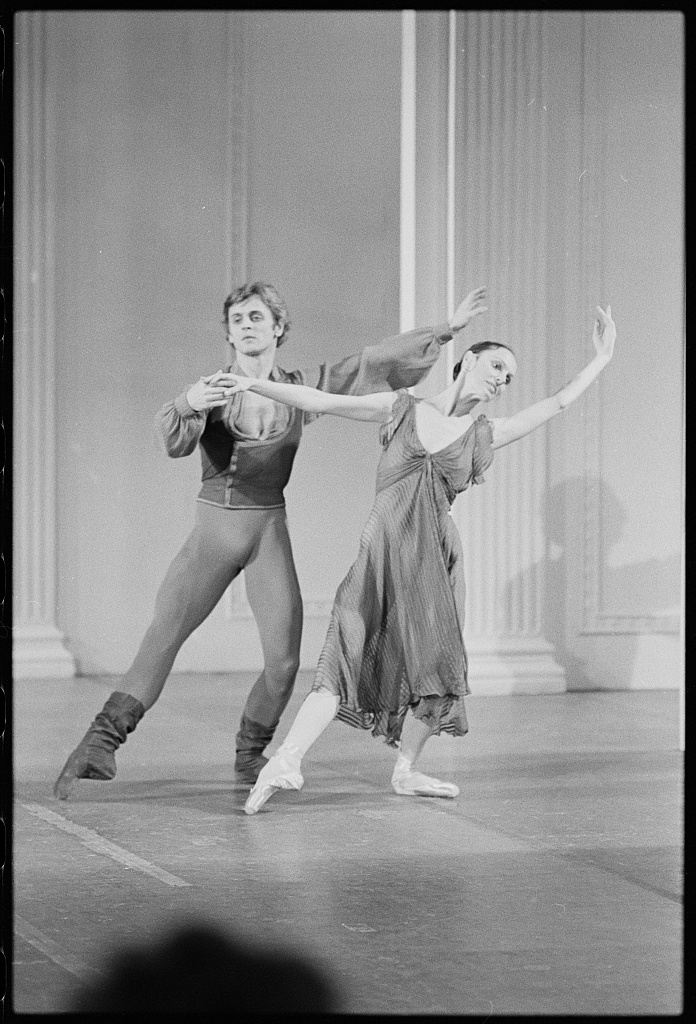
McBride dancing with Baryshnikov in 1979

In the 30 years she spent with the company, McBride had numerous roles created for her by George Balanchine, including Hermia in A Midsummer Night's Dream; Tarantella; Colombine in Harlequinade; the ballerina role in the Intermezzo of Brahms–Schoenberg Quartet; Rubies in Jewels; Who Cares? ("The Man I Love" pas de deux and "Fascinatin' Rhythm" solo); Divertimento from Le Baiser de la Fée; Swanilda in Coppélia; Pavane;The Steadfast Tin Soldier; the Pearly Queen in Union Jack and the "Voices of Spring" section of Vienna Waltzes.

Jerome Robbins created roles for McBride in Dances at a Gathering (pink), In the Night (third nocturne), The Goldberg Variations, The Four Seasons (fall) and Opus 19/The Dreamer, among other ballets.

In 1979, she danced in Le Bourgeois Gentilhomme, a ballet based on the 1670 play by Molière. Her role was minor, and danced well, in contrast to that of Rudolf Nureyev and Jean‐Pierre Bonnefoux. The dance had been first choreographed by Balanchine, then picked up by Jerome Robbins.

McBride was featured in the documentary film A Portrait of Giselle. A video of her and Edward Villella performing Tarantella was filmed by German television, and a live NYCB performance of Coppelia starring her was telecast on PBS.

== Honors ==
McBride was honored with a special performance of the City Ballet on June 4, 1989 at the New York State Theater at New York City's Lincoln Center on her retirement.

McBride was recognized on December 7, 2014, as a Kennedy Center Honors recipient.

== Charlotte Ballet ==
McBride is the Associate Artistic Director and Master Teacher of Charlotte Ballet.

== Personal life ==
She resides in Charlotte, North Carolina, along with her two children. She lived with her husband Jean-Pierre Bonnefous, also a dancer and teacher of dance, until his death in 2025.
