= Chéri (novel) =

1920 novel by Colette

- Author: Colette
- Language: French
- Genre: Romance novel
- Published: 1920 by Calmann-Lévy
- Publication place: France
- Media type: Print (hardcover & paperback)
- Pages: 190
- OCLC: 3472377
- Dewey Decimal: 843.9
- LC Class: PQ2605.O28
- Followed by: La Fin de Chéri

Chéri is a novel by Colette published in France in 1920. The title character's true name is Fred Peloux, but he is known as Chéri to almost everyone, except, usually, to his wife. This novel was followed by a sequel, La Fin de Chéri, published in 1926.

== Plot summary ==
The novel opens with an exchange between Léa and Chéri. They are physically involved, and they argue while Chéri plays with Léa's pearls and thinks on her age. He mentions his marriage prospects, but she seems to take this in stride as they believe their relationship is casual. They have been involved for around six years, and she is 49 while he is 25. Léa alternatingly obsesses over getting old and celebrates what she has done and who she has had in her life while demonstrating no remorse over her life as a courtesan. As they often do, the pair playfully fight before making up, and he runs off to meet his potential bride, Edmée. Edmée is revealed to be a reticent girl with a boisterous, rude mother (Marie-Laure).

At this point, there are flashbacks through the course of their relationship. Léa considers Chéri's mother, Charlotte, a competitor but she also appears to be one of her closest friends. When Chéri was nineteen, Léa mentioned taking a trip to the country. She and Chéri argue a little, kiss and make up, and travel together to Normandy where they stay for several months as lovers. At times she thinks that he is so distant, he might as well speak another language. After attempting to have him trained in boxing, the text flashes forward to a more recent time.

Chéri is telling Léa of his upcoming marriage to Edmée and is disappointed by her lack of response. Notably, his mother and Edmée's mother are at war over the couple's future financial arrangements. After their marriage, Chéri is notably depressed. Léa takes her leave without telling anyone where she is going or when she will come back. Chéri does not take this news well and wishes constantly to know more while reflecting on the shocking youth of his young (nineteen year old) bride and comparing her with Léa.

After an argument with Edmée, Chéri goes for a late night walk and eventually ends up with a friend, Desmond. He has Desmond call his house for him and tell them first that he is having dinner and then that he is staying with Desmond for the night. He does not return home for months though. In this time period, he repeatedly thinks of going home or of divorce, yet he does neither. He pays Desmond for his services, yet he never actually sleeps with the women or does the drugs that are provided. In his absence, Edmée writes him to say that she will wait at their home for further instructions.

After having been gone for six and a half months, Léa returns. This spurs Chéri to buy apology gifts and actually return home to his young wife (who happily accepts his return after his three months' absence). It is revealed that Léa had some lovers while she was away; however, she seems uninterested in most of her old habits once she has returned to Paris. Realizing she is being ridiculous, she begins trying to make plans to keep her mind from her longing for Chéri.

Not long afterward, Chéri turns up on Léa's doorstep and she lets him in. He declares he is here to stay and they realize their relationship was one of love. They have sex that night. After awakening, she begins to plan for them to escape Paris discreetly together; however, there seem to be some prior feelings that they cannot move beyond.

They begin to argue, and he must remind her of what a kind woman she typically is and how she is supposed to care for others. He admits that he has been obsessed with seeing her again and could not move past her. Although this may be true, in the light of morning, he sees how she has aged tremendously and realizes that the Léa he longed for is gone. Heartbroken, she thanks him for finding her beautiful and worthy for so long. She says he should blame her for all that is wrong with him, and sends him home to his wife despite longing to do otherwise. As he walks away, she excitedly thinks he may turn around; however, he does not. The novel ends with his back to her as he leaves and him filling his lungs with air the way an escaped convict might.

== English translations ==
- Chéri and The Last of Chéri, translated by Roger Senhouse (Farrar, Straus and Giroux, 1951)
- Chéri and The End of Chéri, translated by Rachel Careau (W. W. Norton, 2022) ISBN 978-1-324-00637-4
- Chéri and The End of Chéri, translated by Paul Eprile (New York Review Books, 2022) ISBN 9781681376707

== Adaptations ==
The novel has been adapted to film twice, in 1950 by Pierre Billon and in 2009 by Stephen Frears to a screenplay by Christopher Hampton with Rupert Friend as Chéri and Michelle Pfeiffer as Léa; and for television twice, in 1962 by François Chatel with Jean-Claude Brialy and Madeleine Robinson, and as a five-part series for the BBC in 1973 by Claude Whatham with Scott Antony and Yvonne Mitchell.

South African composer David Earl wrote the music for a ballet of Chéri in 1978. Choreographed for the Scottish Ballet by Peter Darrell, it premiered at the Edinburgh Festival in September 1980 with Léa and Chéri danced by Patrick Bissell and Galina Samsova. The set was designed by Philip Prowse. This ballet was revived by the Hong Kong Ballet in 1989.

== In art ==
Womanhouse (January 30 – February 28, 1972) was a feminist art installation and performance space organized by Judy Chicago and Miriam Schapiro, co-founders of the California Institute of the Arts (CalArts) Feminist Art Program, and was the first public exhibition of art centered upon female empowerment. One of the rooms in it, Leah's Room by Karen LeCocq and Nancy Youdelman, was based on the novel. Karen and Nancy borrowed an antique dressing table and rug, made lace curtains and covered the bed with satin and lace to create the effect of a boudoir. They filled the closet with old-looking clothes and veiled hats, and wallpapered the walls to add a feeling of nostalgia. LeCocq sat at the dressing table dressed in a nineteenth-century-style costume as Léa, studiously applying make-up over and over and then removing it, replicating the character's attempts to save her fading beauty.
