= Debra Austin (dancer) =

American ballet dancer (born 1955)

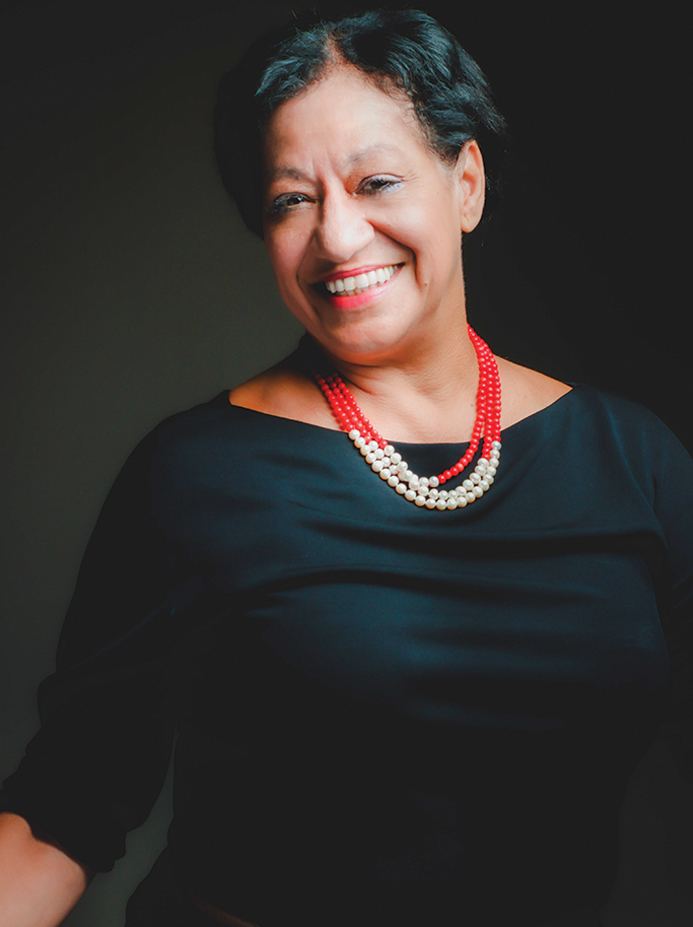
- Born: July 25, 1955 (age 71); United States
- Education: Professional Children's School; School of American Ballet
- Occupations: Ballet dancer, Ballet master
- Spouse: Marin Boieru (m. 1992)
- Children: 2
- Career
- Former groups: New York City Ballet; Zurich Ballet; Pennsylvania Ballet

Debra Austin (born July 25, 1955) is an American ballet dancer who rose to prominence in 1982 when she was promoted to the rank of principal dancer at Pennsylvania Ballet, making her the first African-American female principal dancer of a major American ballet company. She was also the first African-American female dancer at the New York City Ballet. She currently serves as the ballet mistress for the Carolina Ballet.

== Career ==
Debra Austin began dancing when she was eight years old. At the age of twelve, she was awarded a scholarship to dance at the School of American Ballet in New York City. While a dance student at the School of American Ballet, she attended the Professional Children's School for academics. She was handpicked by George Balanchine at age sixteen to join the New York City Ballet, officially becoming the company's first African-American female dancer at age sixteen. Austin appeared in performances that were televised for the PBS series Live from Lincoln Center and the NBC television special Live From Studio H. She later left the New York City Ballet to dance for the Zurich Ballet in Switzerland, where she was promoted to soloist.

After returning to the United States in 1982, she was hired by her former fellow dancer at New York City Ballet, Robert Weiss, then the artistic director of the Pennsylvania Ballet, to be a principal dancer for the company, making her the first African-American woman to reach the rank of principal dancer in a major American ballet company. This was eight years before Lauren Anderson became a principal dancer for the Houston Ballet, even though she is commonly incorrectly accredited as being the first. (Note: In May 2007, The New York Times incorrectly described Anderson as "the first – and until recently, only – black woman promoted to the rank of principal at a major American company." As of July 2016, the anticipated National Museum of African American History and Culture is planning on attributing Anderson with the achievement. In October 2007, Anderson acknowledged in an interview that she was not the first African-American female principal dancer at a major American company.) At the Pennsylvania Ballet, Austin danced in Swan Lake, Coppélia, A Midsummer Night's Dream, Apollo, Symphony in C, Giselle, and La Sylphide. She danced at a Gala Performance at the Academy of Music, hosted by Bill Cosby, while accompanied by Grover Washington on the saxophone.

Austin assisted Lynne Taylor-Corbett in her ballet The Dancing Princesses for Miami City Ballet, which premiered at the John F. Kennedy Center for the Performing Arts in Washington, D.C., on April 25, 1995. She served as a preliminary judge for the National Foundation for the Advancement of the Arts.

Austin retired from dancing in 1990. She has taught ballet at the American Cultural Center, Palm Beach Dance Center, the Miami City Ballet School, and Cary Ballet Conservatory. When the Carolina Ballet was founded by Weiss in 1997, Austin was hired as a ballet master for the company.

== Personal life ==
Austin married Romanian ballet dancer Marin Boieru in 1992, whom she met while they were both performing with Pennsylvania Ballet. She and her husband both work as ballet masters for the Carolina Ballet. They have two daughters, Olivia and Bianca.
