= The Four Temperaments =

Orchestral work and ballet by Paul Hindemith

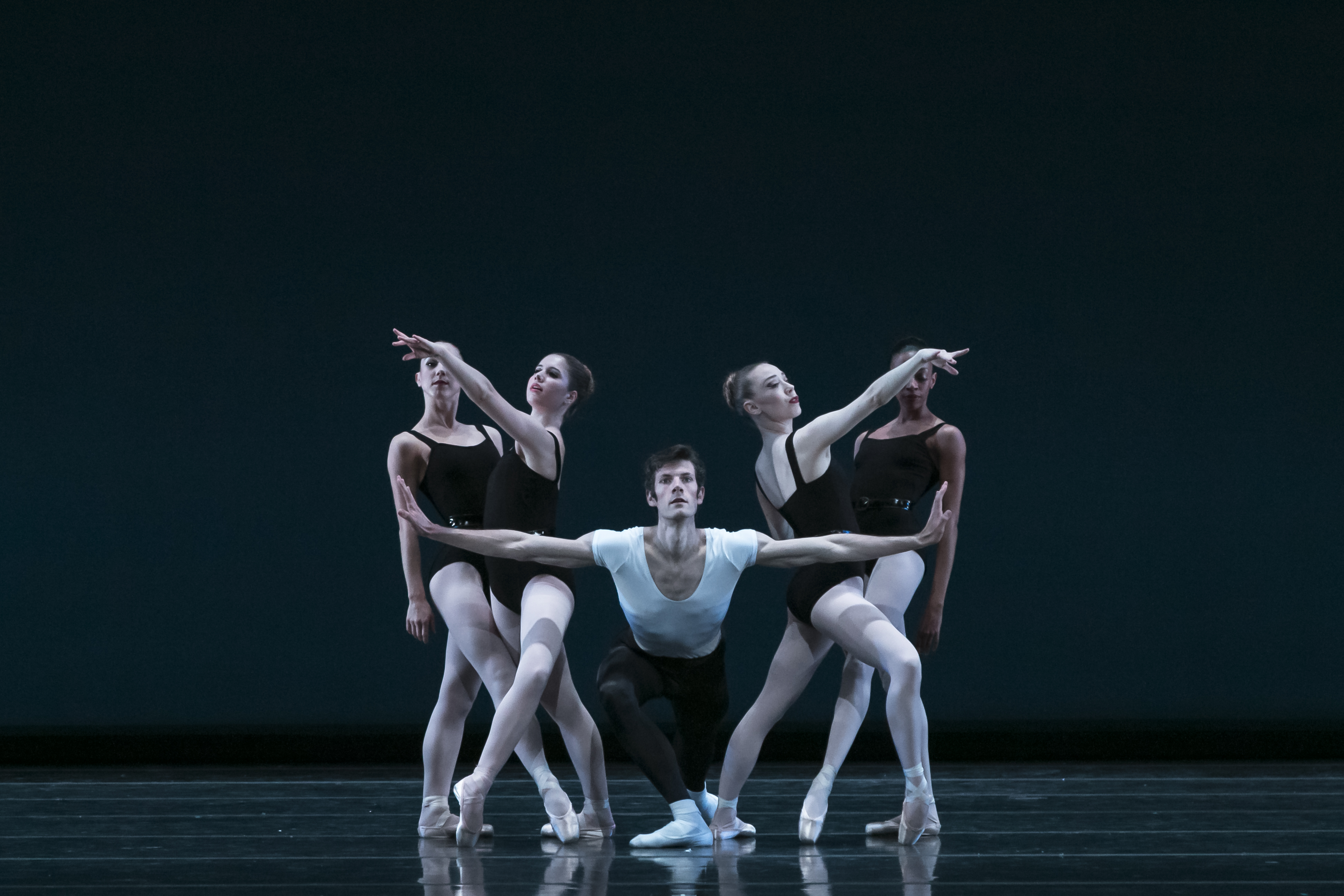
Kansas City Ballet dancers in The Four Temperaments (2015 production)

The Four Temperaments or Theme and Four Variations (The Four Temperaments) is an orchestral work and ballet by Paul Hindemith. Although it was originally conceived as a ballet for Léonide Massine, the score was ultimately completed as a commission for George Balanchine, who subsequently choreographed it as a neoclassical ballet based on the theory of the four temperaments.

The music was premiered in Switzerland by the Stadtorchester Winterthur under the direction of Hermann Scherchen on March 10, 1943. However, Balanchine created the choreography a few years later. The ballet, The Four Temperaments was the first work Balanchine made for the Ballet Society, the forerunner of the New York City Ballet, and premiered on November 20, 1946, at the Central High School of Needle Trades, New York, during the Ballet Society's first performance. Though critics at the premiere did not receive the ballet well, it was later acknowledged as a "masterpiece," and was revived by ballet companies worldwide.

== Background and production ==
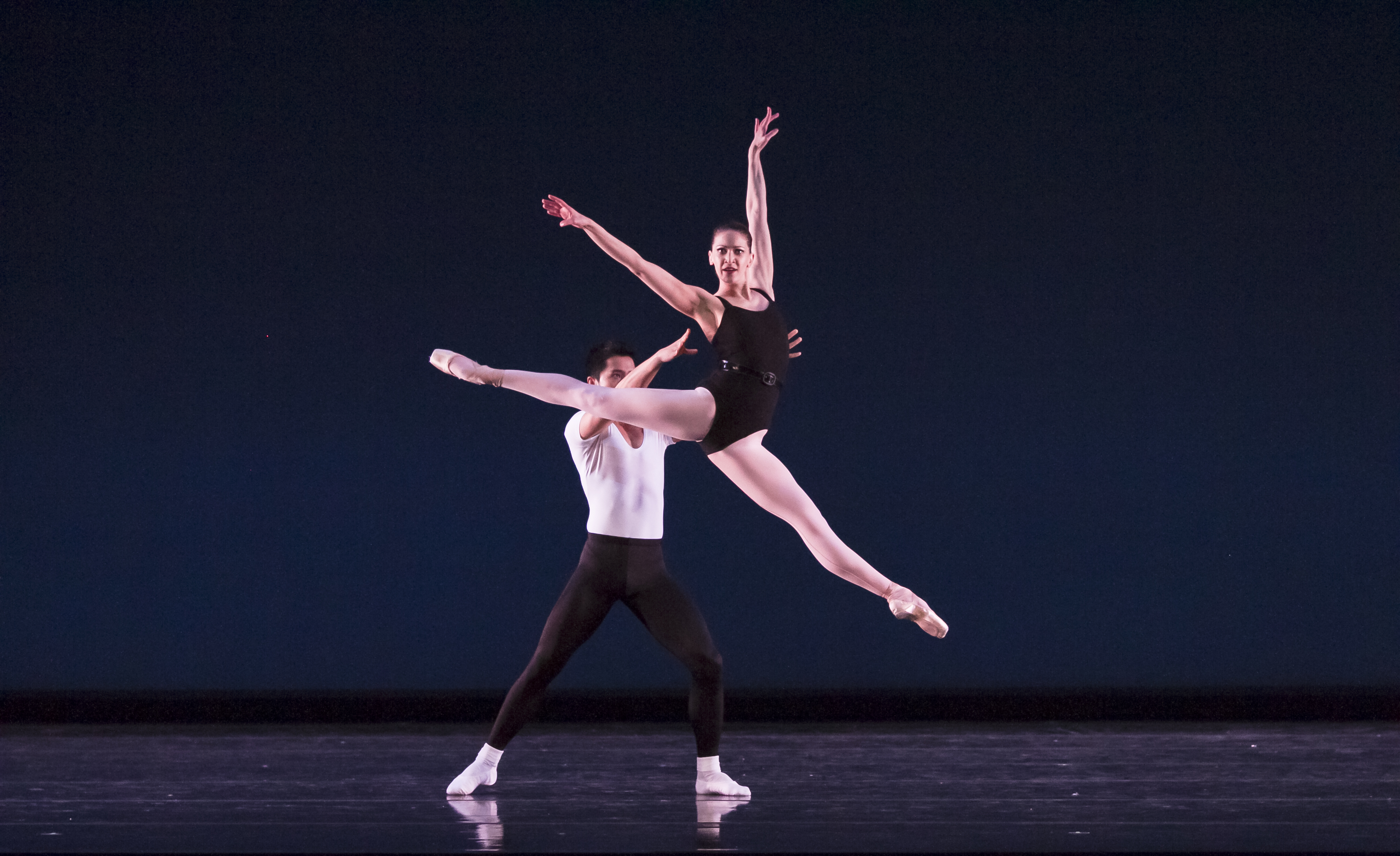
Kansas City Ballet's Angelina Sansone and Liang Fu in The Four Temperaments

Hindemith's score was borne from the success of his previous collaboration with Massine, Nobilissima Visione. Initially, they both conceived of a ballet based on the paintings of Pieter Brueghel the Elder, a score which the composer was projecting to being akin to a "Flemish peasant Persephone." Although Hindemith had composed a significant portion of the score according to Massine's scenario by 1940, he lost confidence in the choreographer after he devised an entirely new scenario for the work. On April 26, 1940, Hindemith wrote to his publisher, Willy Strecker of B. Schott's Söhne, that he had "broken off" his partnership with Massine, but that work on the score was continuing on schedule. Although definitive proof has not been established, it is generally believed that Hindemith's music from his aborted project ultimately became The Four Temperaments. On November 4, 1940, Hindemith wrote that the music was "quite good and worthy of a better cause."

Balanchine first commissioned the score from Hindemith for his own amusement, as a way to spend his income from working on Broadway and Hollywood, hoping he could enjoy listening to and play it on the piano. At the time, Balanchine approached Hindemith's agent about a commission and learned that it would cost five hundred dollars, but Hindemith was unavailable at the time. A year later, he became available, and the first part of the music was sent to Balanchine a week later. The piece, "Theme with Four Variations (According to the Four Temperaments), for string orchestra and piano", had its first hearing at Balanchine's apartment in 52 Street, Fifth Avenue, Manhattan, conducted by Edvard Fendler, Nicholas Kopeikine on the piano, and the orchestra consisted of Balanchine's friends including Nathan Milstein, Samuel Dushkin, Léon Barzin and Raya Garbousova.

Balanchine first considered using Hindemith's score for a ballet in 1941, when the American Ballet was going tour in Latin America, sponsored by the State Department. The piece would be titled The Cave of Sleep, and Pavel Tchelitchew was brought in to design, but the project was abandoned due to its cost and Hindemith's objection.

Hindemith's piece was ultimately used in The Four Temperaments, the first ballet George Balanchine choreographed for the Ballet Society. The Ballet Society, co-founded by Balanchine and Lincoln Kirstein, was a subscription-only company that would mainly perform new works, and the forerunner of New York City Ballet. One of the lead dancers in the original cast, Tanaquil Le Clercq, was seventeen when she created a lead role in this ballet, which was also her first professional solo role.

The costumes of the original production were designed by Kurt Seligmann, and were deemed impractical. Le Clercq called them "hideous" and "gave you a feeling of claustrophobia I can't describe." She noted the costumes include a wig with "a large white horn in the middle like a unicorn's," which she called "very irritating." It also included wings with "fingers enclosed." Starting with a 1951 New York City Ballet revival, the costumes were replaced with practice clothes, which include black leotards for women, white T-shirts and black tights for men.

== Choreography and analysis ==
... [The ballet] is an expression in dance and music of the ancient notion that the human organism is made up of four different humors, or temperaments. Each one of us possesses these four humors, but in different degrees, and it is from the dominance of one of them that the four physical and psychological types—melancholic, sanguinic, phlegmatic, and choleric—were derived ... Although the score is based on this idea of the four temperaments, neither the music nor the ballet itself makes specific or literal interpretation of the idea. An understanding of the Greek and medieval notion of the temperaments was merely the point of departure for both composer and choreographer.

— George Balanchine, Balanchine's Complete Stories of the Great Ballets (1977)

The Four Temperaments, subtitled A Dance Ballet without Plot. is an "abstract" plotless ballet, and as biographer Bernard Taper described, "unlike anything that had ever been seen in ballet before." The choreography stems from the music, with emphasis on "pulse drive", "change of weight" and "foot and leg work", which would become part of Balanchine's vocabulary in making modernist works. The ballet features a theme and four variations that are based on the theory of four temperaments, including Melancholic, Sanguinic, Phlegmatic and Choleric.

The ballet starts with the Theme, with three separate pas de deux. In the book The Faber Pocket Guide to Ballet, dance critic Luke Jennings and former Royal Ballet principal dancer Deborah Bull described, "The mood is pensive; several physical motifs are carefully developed, and by the third pas de deux the music’s speed is gathering." The first variation, "Melancholic," starts with a male principal dancer. On the choreography of this role, Jennings and Bull wrote, "His movements are articulate, plastic and considered, but he is so earth-bound, and so abject. He searches for escape, but is imprisoned by his fascination with his own condition." Then, he joined by two female soloists, before four other women also enters the stage. At the end of this section, the man bend his back backwards.

The second variation, "Sanguinic," starts with a duet. Jennings and Bull commented, "Their steps and lifts are lit with morning brightness, hungry and speedy." The New Yorker critic Arlene Croce noted the female role "is an allegro technician; but is also in character." They are then joined by a corps de ballet of four women. The third variation, "Phlematic," also starts with a male solo, which Jennings and Bull called "considerable articulacy, but his elaborate designs come to nothing in consequence of his intense inward focus." He is later joined by another four women. Croce wrote that this section "is indolent, tropical, given to detached contemplation, to pretentious vices." The fourth and final variation, "Choleric," begin with a female solo, which Croce called an "angry goddess," then joined by the entire cast. The ballet ends with a series of grand jeté lifts.

At the premiere of the ballet, it was not well-received by critics for being "cold and depressing," but it has come to be regarded, as Jennings and Bull described, as a "masterpiece." In 1975, Croce wrote that it "is a messianic work, which conveys to this day the sense of a brilliant and bold new understanding." The ballet is now considered the prototype of Balanchine's "black and white" ballets; according to The Cambridge Companion to Ballet, by having the dancers perform in practice clothes "Balanchine shifted the focus from spectacle to the dance itself and especially to the unadorned body and its natural line, its flexibility, agility, strength and submission to the force above all explored in The Four Temperaments." It was, moreover, the forerunner to other ballets choreographed by Balanchine, including Ivesiana, Agon, Movements for Piano and Orchestra, Stravinsky Violin Concerto and Kammermusik No. 2. Anna Kisselgoff of The New York Times identified The Four Temperaments as "the ancestor of all the Balanchine ballets that now give the City Ballet its signature style." Jay Rogoff, writing in Salmagundi, called The Four Temperaments "the 1946 modernist masterpiece" responsible for "inaugurating a new era for both the choreographer and for the art of dance."

== Original cast ==
Section	Dancers
Theme	Beatrice Tompkins; José Martinez; Elise Reiman; Lew Christensen; Gisella Caccialanza; Francisco Moncion
First variation: Melancholic	William Dollar; Georgia Hiden; Rita Karlin
Second variation: Sanguinic	Mary Ellen Moylan; Fred Danieli
Third variation: Phlematic	Todd Bolender
Fourth variation: Choleric	Tanaquil Le Clercq

== Performances ==
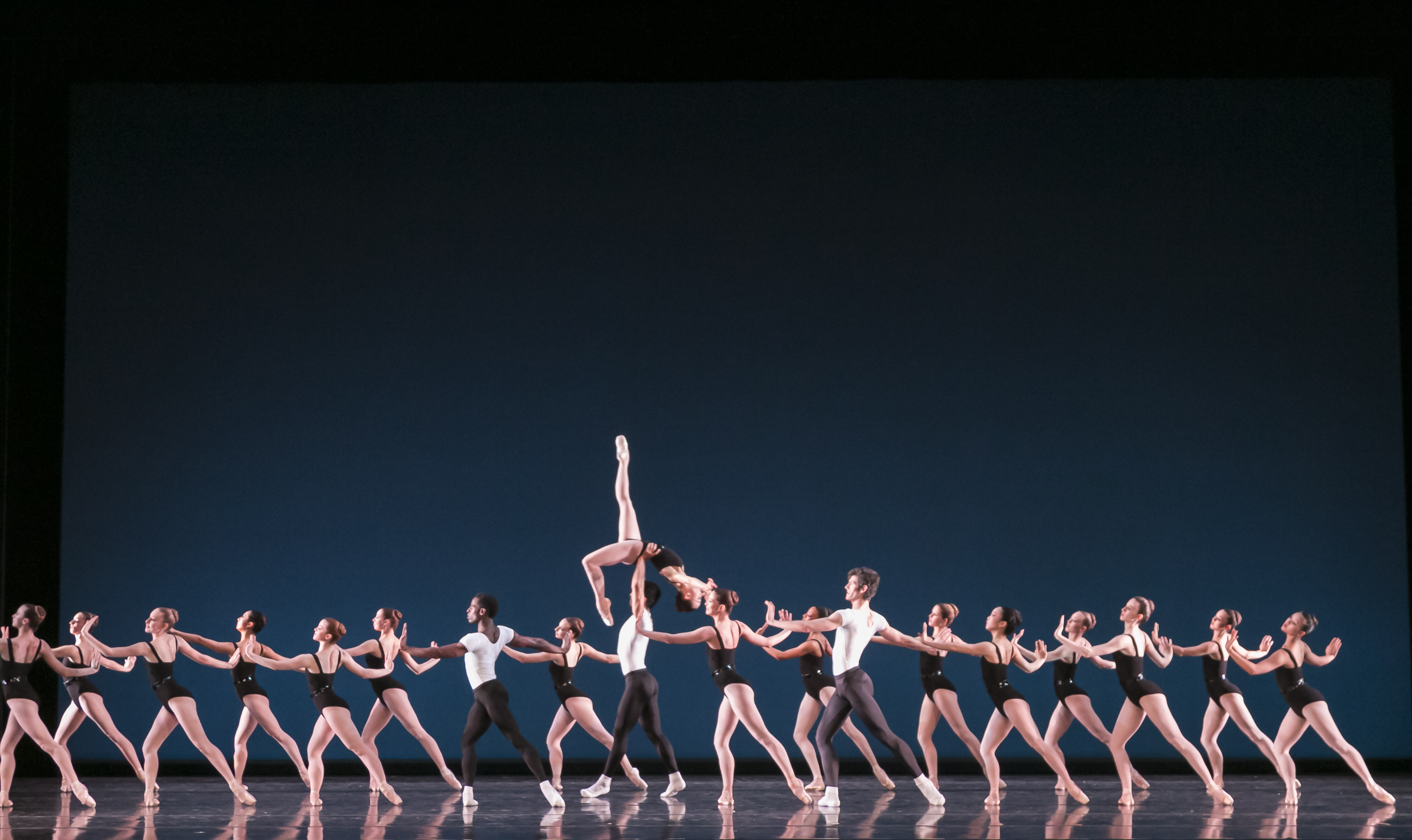
Kansas City Ballet dancers in The Four Temperaments

The Four Temperaments premiered on November 20, 1946, at the auditorium of Central High School of Needle Trades (now High School of Fashion Industries) during Ballet Society's first performance. The stage was merely a raised surface, while the fifty members of the orchestra performed right in front of the audience due to the lack of an orchestra pit. Ravel's opera L'enfant et les sortilèges, also choreographed by Balanchine, was also performed the same night. Due to the company's subscription-only policy, the press was not invited, but reviewers nevertheless were able to attend the performance by either purchasing a subscription themselves, or as Bernard Taper wrote, "sneaking into the auditorium."

New York City Ballet, the successor of Ballet Society, revived The Four Temperaments during one of their earliest performances. Other ballet companies that had performed the ballet include Paris Opera Ballet, The Royal Ballet, San Francisco Ballet, National Ballet of Canada, Dutch National Ballet, Vienna State Ballet, The Australian Ballet, Pacific Northwest Ballet, Boston Ballet, Houston Ballet, Joffrey Ballet, Pennsylvania Ballet and Dance Theatre of Harlem. At New York City Ballet's "Balanchine: The City Center Years" program in 2018, The Four Temperaments was performed by The Joffrey Ballet. The School of American Ballet, the affiliate-school of New York City Ballet, had included The Four Temperaments in their annual workshop performances.

== Videography ==
In 1977, Balanchine, who had long been interested in filming ballets, placed The Four Temperaments as his first choice for PBS' Dance in America broadcast. Dancers who appeared in this broadcast include Bart Cook, Merrill Ashley, Daniel Duell, Adam Lüders and Colleen Neary.
