= The Last of Chéri =

1926 novel by Colette

- Author: Colette
- Language: French
- Genre: Romance novel
- Published: 1926 by Calmann-Lévy
- Publication place: France
- Media type: Print (Hardback & Paperback)
- OCLC: 501997907
- Dewey Decimal: 843.912
- LC Class: PQ2605.O28
- Preceded by: Chéri

The Last of Chéri (French: La Fin de Chéri) is a novel written by Colette. It was published in Paris in 1926. It is the sequel to Colette's 1920 novel Chéri.

== Plot summary ==
The Last of Chéri picks up the lives of Chéri and Léa after a six-year break during which World War I has been fought and Chéri returns an uninjured hero. During this time, Edmée and Madame Peloux have become more assertive in home and business as do many women in the burgeoning suffragist movement. Chéri finds himself wandering aimlessly with no focus now that he does not have his former lover Léa nor the war to occupy his time.

Chéri is also perplexed by the assertive behaviors of Edmée and his mother; he cannot adapt to the new role of women in the post-War era. Eventually, Cheri and Edmée grow further apart and live separate lives, Edmée taking lovers without any jealousy from her husband. Attempting to recapture his past, Chéri visits old friends but finds that they, too, have moved on to new ventures and do not want to dwell in stories of the past. Chéri grows increasingly impatient with his life surrounded by Edmée and Madame Peloux and finds any route he can to escape even for a little while; including buying a car and taking friends on long day trips into the French countryside.

Because he can find no purpose to his life, Chéri obsesses about Léa. He makes the mistake of visiting her one day to find that she has aged and is overweight with short gray hair. Chéri is repulsed by Léa's appearance and plunges into an even deeper despair. Just when Chéri has reached the point where he can think of nothing that interests him or motivates him to think beyond the present, he runs into an old acquaintance, the Pal, who offers up her flat to Chéri's need for time alone.

In the Pal's flat, Chéri finds a wall filled with photographs of Léa, and he spends countless nights lying on a divan and staring at the images. Chéri makes one last attempt to connect with Edmée by asking if she would like a child but Edmée is aghast at the proposition, and Chéri realizes that their marriage is truly over. Chéri visits his mother who understands her son's anguish but can do nothing to assuage it, and they part with Chéri amazed to see a tear in his mother's eye. Chéri visits the Pal's apartment again and with images of Léa staring down at him raises a revolver to his head and pulls the trigger.
