= Stanley Williams (dancer) =

British-Danish ballet dancer and instructor

Stanley Williams (1925–1997) was a dancer and, later, a renowned ballet instructor.

== Early days ==
Stanley Williams was born in England but grew up in Copenhagen, and was enrolled at the Royal Danish School of Ballet. His instruction was steeped in the Bournonville tradition, training with Harald Lander, although he also studied with Vera Volkova, a disciple of Agrippina Vaganova. In 1943, Williams joined the Royal Danish Ballet, becoming a principal dancer six years later, and by 1950 he had begun teaching at the Royal Danish School of Ballet in Copenhagen.

In the 1950s, Stanley Williams was performing as a principal dancer with George Krista's Ballet Comique in London, where he also stood as balletmaster.

By 1964, Williams's reputation had reached George Balanchine, who invited him to instruct at the School of American Ballet in New York City.

== New York ==
From 1964 until his death in 1997, Stanley Williams was first among instructors at the School of American Ballet. As a teacher, he was soft-spoken.

His original teaching style relied a lot on exercises to develop speed, foot work and petit allegro (small jumps), in the tradition of the Bournonville and Balanchine ballet styles. Williams contrasted slow movement with sudden, almost spastic moves, and spoke in vague terms that some students found hard to understand. One of his famous phrases was "You're going out, you have to go in," which he constantly repeated to correct many different types of movements and steps without being too specific.

Williams often stressed his dislike of certain features of the Russian ballet style, which in his opinion, lacked the movement flow, continuity and contrast he was seeking.

He smoked a pipe and was the only person allowed to smoke in the Rose building, where SAB and NYCB are situated. He apparently accepted the job as a teacher on the condition that he be allowed to smoke in the building. The smell of his pipe, which often pervaded the SAB corridors, became associated with him and SAB. He often worked in class with pianists like Lynn STANFORD or Katerina BAPTIST. They played for him using triolet giving an impression of a soft circle music. Katerina BAPTIST released a CD of music for the class "in memory of Stanley Williams".

In 1992 he was awarded the Mae L. Wien Award of $10,000 by the School of American Ballet.

== Notable students ==
Peter Martins
Patrick Bissell
Gelsey Kirkland
Peter Boal
Lawrence Leritz
Fernando Bujones
Edward Villella
