= Carolina Ballet =

Ballet company in North Carolina, US

General information
- Name: Carolina Ballet
- Local name: Carolina Ballet
- Previous names: Raleigh Dance Theatre; Carolina Ballet Theatre
- Year founded: 1997
- Principal venue: Martin Marietta Center for the Performing Arts; Raleigh, North Carolina; United States

Artistic staff
- Artistic Director: Zalman Raffael (current) Robert Weiss (founding)
- Ballet Master: Debra Austin, Marin Boieru, Melissa Podcasy, Pablo Javier Perez, Dameon Nagel

Other
- Formation: Principal; Soloist; Corps de Ballet; Apprentice

Carolina Ballet is one of America's arts organizations, programming traditional ballets and new works by contemporary choreographers. The Ballet was launched as a professional company in 1998 under the direction of Founding Artistic Director Robert Weiss. In 2019, Zalman Raffael became the Artistic Director/CEO joined by Michele Weathers as executive director. For more than 20 years, Carolina Ballet has garnered critical praise from the national and international media, staged over 100 world premiere ballets, and in 2018, chartered the School of Carolina Ballet. Since its inaugural season in 1998, Carolina Ballet and this community have accomplished something remarkable. The company has grown from a budget of $1.2 million featuring sixteen dancers and five apprentices in three programs to a $6.0 million budget featuring 38 dancers in eight programs including the holiday tradition, The Nutcracker.

== History ==
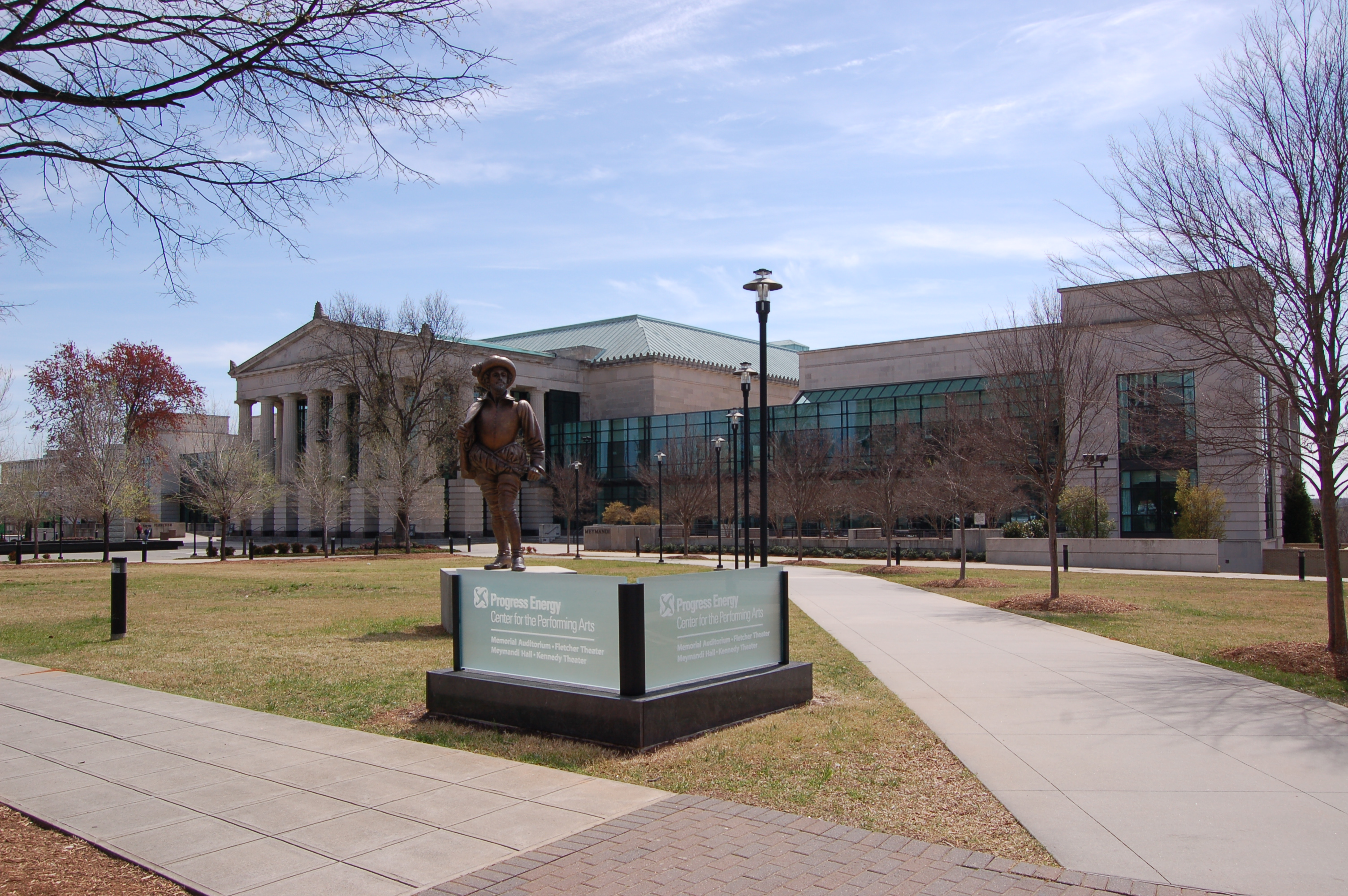
Duke Energy Center for the Performing Arts, primary venue for Carolina Ballet

Carolina Ballet, Inc. was founded in 1984 as Raleigh Dance Theatre, Inc. by Ann Vorus, owner of the Raleigh Dance Theatre. As a student company, its purpose was to provide performance opportunities for students of the school. Over several years, both the school and the company grew in reputation and stature in its metamorphosis as Carolina Ballet Theatre, a pre-professional regional company under Ms. Vorus and her successor as artistic director, Mary LeGere. Performances of the company began to attract favorable notice from area dance critics. In the fall of 1993, Raleigh lawyer Ward Purrington suggested to Ms. Vorus and the Raleigh Dance Theatre board that the company aspire to professional status. Market research suggested a professional dance presence in the Triangle region was not only needed but desired as well.

Robert Weiss, a former principal dancer with New York City Ballet and past artistic director of Pennsylvania Ballet, was selected in April 1997 as the founding artistic director of the new professional company, known as Carolina Ballet, Inc.

== Notable productions ==
- Handel's Messiah, choreography by Robert Weiss, premiering in 1998
- Beethoven, Janáček, J. Mark Scearce The Kreutzer Sonata, based on the Tolstoy novella, 2000
- Carl Orff, Carmina Burana, choreography by Lynne Taylor-Corbett, first performed in 2001
- Poulenc, Debussy, Chausson Monet Impressions, 2006
- Paul Moravec, Tempest Fantasy, based on William Shakespeare's The Tempest, 2007
- Robert Weiss, "Cinderella," music by Karl Moraski

== Dancers ==
Dancers of the Carolina Ballet, as of July 2021:

=== Principals ===
- Margaret Severin-Hansen

=== Soloists ===
- Sam Ainley
- Taylor Ayotte
- Kathleen Black
- Luke Potgieter
- Sokvannara Sar
- McKenzie Van Oss
- Lauren Wolfram

=== Corps de Ballet ===
- Elye Bailey
- Ashton Bradley
- Robert Champ
- Saskia de Muinck Keizer
- Andrew Denise
- Laurel Dorn
- Heather Duncan
- Emily Fretz
- Jonas Godwin
- Pierson Hall
- Zoe Harrel
- Maggie-Kate Howard
- Anthony Hoyos
- Anna Ingold
- Jilian Kossak
- Bryce Leippe
- Juliet Marinello
- Ling Minucci
- Sofia Rose Peetoom
- Russell Schmidt
- Alexa Testa
- Ella Volpe

=== Former dancers ===
- SarahAnne Perel
