= Jean-Pierre Bonnefous =

French ballet dancer and instructor (1943–2025)

- Born: 9 April 1943; Bourg-en-Bresse, German-occupied France
- Died: 15 April 2025 (aged 82); Charlotte, North Carolina, U.S.
- Occupations: Dancer; choreographer; teacher
- Years active: 1954–2025
- Spouse: Patricia McBride
- Children: 2

Jean-Pierre Bonnefous or Bonnefoux (French: [ʒɑ̃pjɛʁ bɔnfu]; 9 April 1943 – 15 April 2025) was a French ballet dancer and instructor. He was during different tenures the artistic director of the Charlotte Ballet and the Chautauqua Institution.

== Life and career ==
At 14, Bonnefous joined the Paris Opera Ballet, and became a star dancer at age 21. Under the direction of George Balanchine, Bonnefous became a principal dancer with the New York City Ballet.

He served twice as the president of the jury at the Prix de Lausanne (2005 and 2007).

Bonnefous resided with his wife Patricia McBride and two children in Charlotte, North Carolina, where he died on 15 April 2025, at the age of 82.

== Filmography ==
Year	Title	Role	Notes
1954	Wild Fruit	José Manzana	
1955	Les Diaboliques	Le jeune De Gascuel	Uncredited
1956	Les carottes sont cuites	Ded Boyer / Boyeski	
2001	Violette et Mister B.	Himself	
