= Merrill Ashley =

American ballet dancer

- Born: Linda Michelle Merrill; December 2, 1950 (age 74); Saint Paul, Minnesota, U.S.
- Education: School of American Ballet
- Occupations: ballet dancer; répétiteur
- Spouse: Kibbe Fitzpatrick (m. 1974)
- Career
- Former groups: New York City Ballet

Linda Michelle Merrill (born December 2, 1950), known professionally as Merrill Ashley, is an American former ballet dancer and répétiteur. She joined the New York City Ballet in 1967, was promoted to principal dancer in 1977, and retired in 1997. She is one of the last dancers to have worked with George Balanchine, and coaches his works since she stopped performing.

== Early life ==
Linda Michelle Merrill was born on December 2, 1950, in Saint Paul, Minnesota, and raised in Rutland, Vermont. She started ballet at age seven. In 1964, at thirteen, she entered the School of American Ballet full-time with a scholarship.

== Career ==
She joined the New York City Ballet in 1967, making her debut as a corps dancer in A Midsummer Night's Dream. As there was another dancer named Linda Merrill, she performed under the stage name Merrill Ashley. She was promoted to soloist in 1974 and principal dancer in 1977. Ashley was known for her speed. She was one of the last dancers to have worked with George Balanchine, and created two lead roles for him, in Ballo della Regina and Ballade. Balanchine also revived The Four Temperaments and Square Dance for her. Ashley also originated roles in Robbins' Requiem Canticles, Robbins' and Tharp's Brahms/Handel and Martins' Fearful Symmetries. Other Balanchine ballets she was known for include Concerto Barocco, Donizetti Variations, Gounod Symphony and Chaconne.

Outside of the New York City Ballet, Ashley toured with Jacques d'Amboise's troupe around the US and with her own group, Merrill Ashley and Dancers, in Hawaii. She also performed Paquita and The Sleeping Beauty with the Sadler's Wells Royal Ballet (now the Birmingham Royal Ballet). Her book, Dancing with Balanchine, was published in 1984.

Ashley retired from the New York City Ballet in 1997, shortly before she turned 47, after 30 years of dancing. She was the longest-serving dancer at New York City Ballet at the time. She remained in the company as a teaching associate until 2008, then went freelance to coach Balanchine ballets in other companies. The documentary The Dance Goodbye follows her ten years after she retired dealing with injuries sustained during her dance career.

== Personal life ==
In 1974, Ashley married Kibbe Fitzpatrick, a United Nations linguist.
