= Gelsey Kirkland =

American ballerina (born 1952)

- Born: Gelsey Kirkland; December 29, 1952 (age 73); Bethlehem, Pennsylvania, U.S.
- Spouses: Greg Lawrence (div.); Michael Chernov
- Parents: Jack Kirkland (father); Nancy Hoardley (mother)

Gelsey Kirkland (born December 29, 1952) is an American prima ballerina. She received early ballet training at the School of American Ballet. Kirkland joined the New York City Ballet in 1968 at age 15, at the invitation of George Balanchine. She was promoted to soloist in 1969, and principal in 1972. She went on to create leading roles in many of the great twentieth century ballets by Balanchine, Jerome Robbins, and Antony Tudor, including Balanchine's revival of The Firebird, Robbins' Goldberg Variations, and Tudor's The Leaves are Fading.

Balanchine re-choreographed his version of Igor Stravinsky's The Firebird specifically for her. She left the New York City Ballet to join the American Ballet Theatre in 1974 as a principal dancer.

Kirkland appeared in the dance role of Clara Stahlbaum in Mikhail Baryshnikov's 1977 televised production of The Nutcracker, which Baryshnikov also acted in as the titular Nutcracker/Prince. She left the American Ballet Theatre (ABT) in 1984, but later returned.

== Early life and education ==
Kirkland was born December 29, 1952, in Bethlehem, Pennsylvania. Her father, Jack Kirkland, was a playwright who penned the Broadway adaptations of Tobacco Road and Tortilla Flat. Her mother, Nancy Hoardley, was an actress. Her sister, Johnna Kirkland, also studied at the School of American Ballet and danced with the New York City Ballet.

While with the New York City Ballet from 1968 to 1974, Kirkland performed as a soloist and principal dancer in several ballets including Concerto Barocco, The Cage, Irish Fantasy, Symphony in C, La Source, Theme and Variations, Tarantella, Harlequinade, The Nutcracker, and Dances at a Gathering.

== Career ==
After Mikhail Baryshnikov defected in 1974, Kirkland joined him for the first time dancing with the Royal Winnipeg Ballet, before the duo joined the American Ballet Theatre later that year. She performed as a principal dancer in a number of classical ballets including the title role in Giselle, Kitri in Don Quixote, Clara in The Nutcracker, Swanilda in Coppélia, Aurora in The Sleeping Beauty, Juliet in Romeo and Juliet, the Sylph in La Sylphide, Lise in La Fille Mal Gardée, Odette/Odile in Swan Lake, Nikiya in The Kingdom of the Shades, the Mazurka and pas de deux in Les Sylphides, and the Sleepwalker in La Sonnambula.

Kirkland was repeatedly fired (but always rehired) by American Ballet Theatre for drug abuse and erratic behavior. Her partner Patrick Bissell introduced her to cocaine, which the two did together. Kirkland said many of the dancers in the company were doing all kinds of drugs to cope with the pressures of dancing. In spite of her substance abuse, she became a prima ballerina.

She defected to London, England to dance with the Royal Ballet of London. She partnered with Anthony Dowell to dance Romeo and Juliet. She hand-picked Stephen Jeffries to dance Sleeping Beauty with her.

Kirkland was featured on cover of Time on May 1, 1978.

In 1986, Kirkland retired from performing, becoming a ballet teacher, choreographer, and coach.

In 2006, she was awarded the Dance Magazine Award.

In 2007, Kirkland, Michael Chernov, and American Ballet Theatre artistic director Kevin McKenzie choreographed a new production of Tchaikovsky's The Sleeping Beauty, in which, after an absence from the stage of more than 20 years, she danced the role of "Carabosse, the Wicked Fairy".

In 2010, Kirkland and Chernov established the Gelsey Kirkland Academy of Classical Ballet (GKACB), where they served as co-Artistic Directors. The Gelsey Kirkland Academy of Classical Ballet was accompanied by the Gelsey Kirkland Ballet company. The ballet company presented classical ballets in New York City. The company eventually closed.

=== Books ===
Kirkland's first autobiography, Dancing on My Grave (1986), written with her then-husband Greg Lawrence, was a memoir chronicling her artistic transformation from George Balanchine's "baby ballerina" to one of the more acclaimed ballerinas of her generation. The book describes in detail her struggles with her domestic family problems, sibling rivalry, anorexia, bulimia, plastic surgeries, drug addiction, her quest for artistic perfection, and her complicated love affairs with Mikhail Baryshnikov and numerous other men, most of whom she encountered in the ballet world. Dancing on My Grave was dedicated to Joseph Duell, a dancer with the New York City Ballet who had committed suicide that same year, in 1986, in hopes "that the cry for help might yet be heard".

Kirkland's second autobiography, The Shape of Love (1990), dealt with her move to England to dance with The Royal Ballet, her attempts to get a fresh start with her first husband, and her return to American Ballet Theatre with a clean slate and a renewed outlook on life. She danced Romeo and Juliet with Anthony Dowell and Sleeping Beauty with Stephen Jeffries.

In 1993, Kirkland and her husband eventually collaborated again on a children's book, The Little Ballerina and Her Dancing Horse, about a little girl who loves ballet but might not be able to keep dancing if she keeps riding her beloved horse Sugar.

== Personal life ==
Kirkland was married to writer Greg Lawrence and they collaborated on each other's projects until they divorced. She currently lives in Maine with her second husband, dancer, choreographer, and teacher Michael Chernov, who was also with ABT.

== Bibliography ==
- Kirkland, Gelsey; Lawrence, Greg (1986). Dancing on My Grave. Garden City, New York: Doubleday and Company. ISBN 0-385-19964-3.
- Kirkland, Gelsey; Lawrence, Greg (1990). The Shape of Love: The Story of Dancing on My Grave Continues. New York, New York: Doubleday and Company, Inc. ISBN 0-385-24918-7.
