= Robert Weiss (choreographer) =

American ballet dancer

Robert Weiss is an American ballet dancer, choreographer, and Artistic Director of Carolina Ballet. He began his professional career at age 17 joining the New York City Ballet under George Balanchine, eventually becoming a Principal Dancer sometime prior to 1977. Balanchine created several roles for him, including Ballo della Regina. Weiss remained with the New York City Ballet for 16 years. He later served as Artistic Director of the Pennsylvania Ballet from 1982 to 1990. Weiss then became the founding Artistic Director of Carolina Ballet in 1997 where he has remained to this day.

== Artistic credits ==
Notable choreography credits include:

- Messiah
- Carmen
- The Kreutzer Sonata
- Romeo & Juliet
- Stravinsky's Clowns
- Don Quixote
