= Tarantella (ballet) =

1964 ballet by George Balanchine

- Choreographer: George Balanchine
- Music: Louis Moreau Gottschalk
- Premiere: January 7, 1964; New York City Center
- Original ballet company: New York City Ballet
- Design: Barbara Karinska
- Created for: Patricia McBride; Edward Villella
- Genre: Neoclassical ballet

Tarantella is a ballet choreographed by George Balanchine to Grande Tarantelle by Louis Moreau Gottschalk, arranged by Hershy Kay. The ballet premiered on January 7, 1964, at the New York City Center, performed by New York City Ballet's Patricia McBride and Edward Villella.

== Production ==
George Balanchine originally created Tarantella, a pas de deux, to showcase New York City Ballet dancers Patricia McBride and Edward Villella's techniques, especially the latter's speed and jumps. According to Villella, Balanchine created Tarantella between rehearsals of his other works, and each time they would only work on small sections and not in order. Villella only realized the stamina required when Balanchine put all the choreography together. He later recalled, "I would be flying parallel to the floor, and then I would be in the wings, on the ground, gasping for air". New York Times critic Anna Kisselgoff wrote that Danish choreographer August Bournonville's influence on Balanchine is "debatable", but Tarantella is one of Balanchine's ballets that "paid homage" to Bournonville.

The title of the ballet is taken from Tarantella, a type of Neapolitan folk dance accompanied by tambourines. Hershy Kay rearranged Louis Moreau Gottschalk's Grande Tarantelle for the ballet. The costumes are designed by Barbara Karinska. The man dresses in red and black and wears a gold earring while the woman is in red and white. The dancers also uses tambourines. The ballet was NYCB's last premiere at the New York City Center before moving to New York State Theater.

== Revivals ==
Other companies that have performed Tarantella include the Miami City Ballet, which Villella founded, Pacific Northwest Ballet, Joffrey Ballet, San Francisco Ballet, and The Royal Ballet. In 2018, at New York City Ballet's festival "Balanchine: The City Center Years", Tarantella was performed by Anna Rose O'Sullivan and Marcelino Sambé, both from The Royal Ballet. New York City Ballet released a 2013 video recording of the ballet, featuring Megan Fairchild and Joaquín De Luz, in response to the coronavirus pandemic.
