= Los Angeles Ballet =

Ballet company

General information
- Name: Los Angeles Ballet
- Year founded: 2004
- Founding artistic director: Aage Thordal-Christensen; Colleen Neary
- Principal venue: Dolby Theatre; Royce Hall; Redondo Beach Performing Arts Center; Pasadena Civic Auditorium; Wallis Annenberg Center for the Performing Arts
- Website: losangelesballet.org

Senior staff
- Executive director: Julia Rivera (Interim)
- Company manager: Kirsten Turkle

Artistic staff
- Artistic director: Melissa Barak
- Ballet mistress: Laura Chachich

Other
- Formation: Ensemble (non-ranked)

Los Angeles Ballet (LAB) is a classical ballet company based in Los Angeles. While rehearsals take place at the Los Angeles Ballet Center, the company tours its performances to venues across the metropolitan area, including the Dolby Theatre, Pasadena Civic Auditorium, and Royce Hall. A typical LAB season consists of Tchaikovsky's The Nutcracker, a large or storybook ballet, and a mixed repertoire performance.

The company was founded and co-directed by husband-and-wife team Thordal Christensen and Colleen Neary, and founding executive director Julie Whittaker. The company debuted December 2006 with an original production of The Nutcracker. In 2022, Melissa Barak became the Artistic Director of the company.

== History ==
The original Los Angeles Ballet was founded in 1974 under the direction of John Clifford, a former principal dancer with New York City Ballet. Eleven years later, in 1985, financial difficulties forced Clifford's company to close.

Two decades later, in 2004, a new Los Angeles Ballet was established by Co-Artistic Directors Thordal Christensen and Colleen Neary, and executive director Julie Whittaker. The company debuted in December 2006, with an original production of The Nutcracker, choreographed by Christensen and Neary, featuring costumes commissioned by Christensen from the Royal Danish Ballet and a Southern California-themed set designed by Catherine Kanner. LAB continues to host performances of The Nutcracker annually. In 2009, LAB presented Bournonville's La Sylphide, its first full-length classical story ballet after The Nutcracker. At the end of nine seasons it presented 28 productions encompassing 50 works, including 15 commissioned world premieres.

In addition to its repertoire of well-known classical ballets, Los Angeles Ballet has also commissioned several new works, one developed out of LAB's Choreographic Workshop, its mission to identify and nurture Southern Californian choreographic talent.

In 2017, Los Angeles Ballet Orchestra, under the direction of internationally renowned conductor Andrea Quinn debuted with The Nutcracker at the Dolby Theatre.

In 2022, Melissa Barak was appointed as the Artistic Director of the Los Angeles Ballet. 2023 marked her full inaugural season with the company.

== Artistic staff ==
=== Artistic directors ===
Thordal Christensen and his wife, Colleen Neary, are the founding directors of the ballet. Christensen was a former principal dancer for and artistic director of the Royal Danish Ballet, with Neary appointed as the ‘first ballet mistress’ in charge of their productions. Neary was a principal dancer with Pacific Northwest Ballet and a Soloist with New York City Ballet under George Balanchine, and is currently a repetiteur for The George Balanchine Trust.

Melissa Barak is the current Artistic Director for the Los Angeles Ballet. She has previously danced with both the Los Angeles Ballet and the New York City Ballet, as well as serving as the Artistic Director for her own Los Angeles-based ballet company, Barak Ballet.

== Dancers ==
The company consists of 24 company dancers and 2 apprentices. LAB holds local and virtual auditions annually. Currently the company is working as a non-ranked company.

=== Company ===
- Shintaro Akana
- Marco Biella
- Bryce Broedell
- Natalia Burns
- Sarah-Ashley Chicola
- Cassidy Cocke
- Poppy Coleman
- Simon Zinabu Costello
- John Dekle
- Brigitte Edwards
- Lilly Fife
- Aviva Gelfer-Mundl
- Abigail Gross
- Kate Inoue
- Anna Jacobs
- Julianne Kinasiewicz
- Lilly Leech
- Marcos Ramirez
- Cesar Ramirez Castellano
- Jake Ray
- Jacob Soltero
- Cleo Taneja
- Jonas Tutaj
- Paige Wilkey

Apprentices

- Taylor Hugens
- Lilly Olvera

== Former members ==
=== Former dancers ===
- Melissa Barak
- Lana Condor
- Craig Hall
- Bianca Bulle
- Corina Gill
- Sarah Hay
- Kelly Ann Sloan
- Allynne Noelle
- Petra Conti
- Eris Nezha
- Chelsea Page Johnston
- Joshua Brown
- Abby Callahan
- Brittany Cavaco
- Alyssa Harrington
- Jay Markov
- SarahAnne Perel
- Carolynn Rowland

== Repertoire ==
LAB's repertoire focuses on various works and styles; including Balanchine masterpieces and beloved story ballets. Starting in 2023, an emphasis on bold new works became an additional centerpiece to LAB's core artistic mission. Barak premiered her full evening work, Memoryhouse in June 2023 at The Broad Stage. The work returns to the stage in the upcoming 24/25 Season at the Wallis Annenberg Performing Arts Center in Beverly Hills. Off Balance, a new, experimental program series launches in the 24/25 Season.

== Programs ==
LAB has two arts programs. “Power of Performance”, or "POP", was founded with LAB's inception, providing free tickets to disadvantaged children, seniors, veterans, and their families. LAB also sponsors ‘A Chance to Dance Community Day’, launched in October 2012. An all-ages event, the public is encouraged to participate in free ballet, hip-hop, Yoga, Pilates and various other dance/fitness classes. The program serves approximately 200 participants every year.

=== Los Angeles Ballet Center ===
Located on the Westside of Los Angeles, the LA Ballet Center spans 12,000 square feet, incorporating three studios and multiple offices.
