= Jennifer Lauren =

American prima ballerina

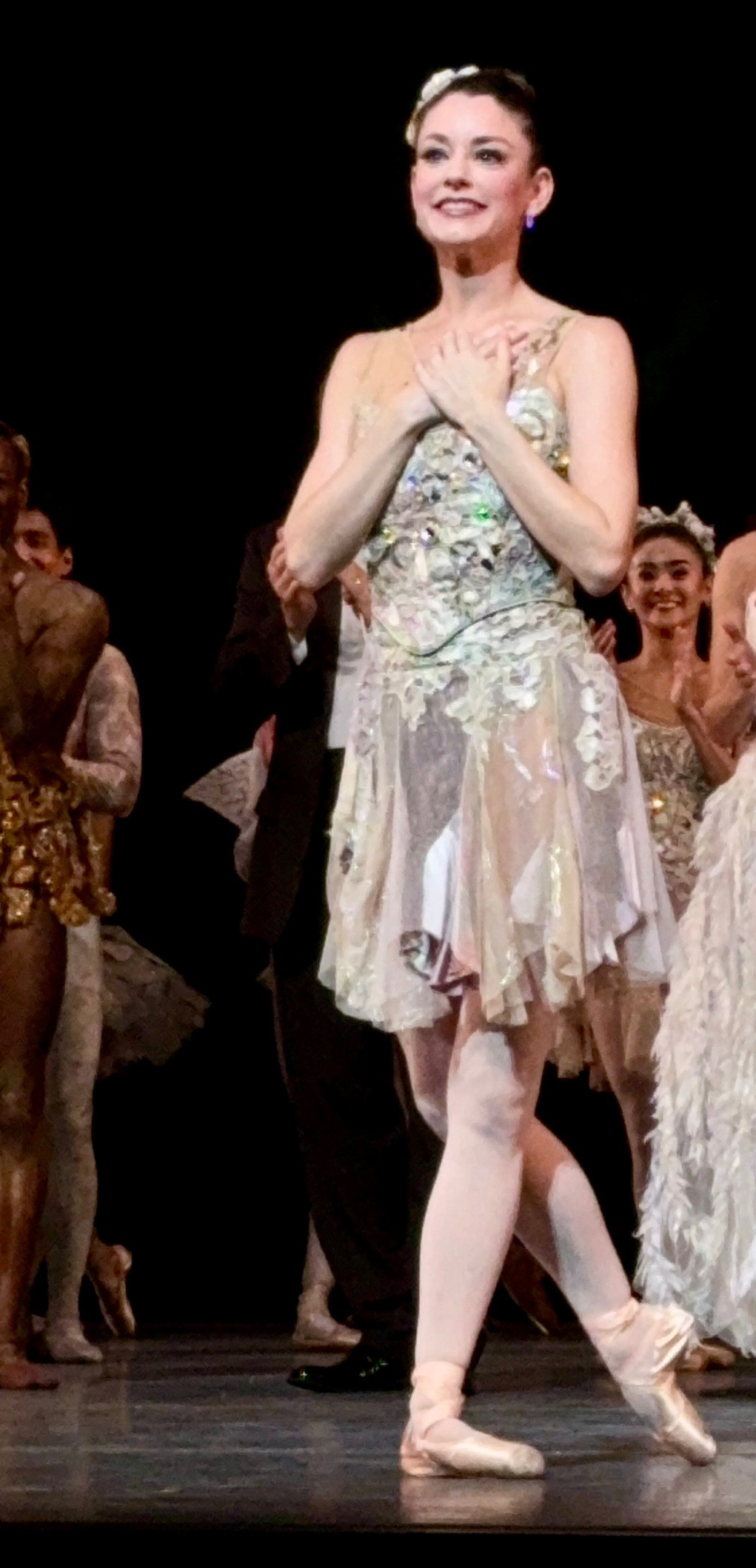
- Born: Jennifer Lauren Quarles; December 1, 1981 (age 43); Tuscaloosa, Alabama, U.S.
- Occupation(s): ballerina, choreographer, rehearsal director, instructor
- Years active: 1998-
- Spouse: Blake F. Pearson (m. 2009)
- Career
- Current group: Miami City Ballet
- Former groups: Alabama Ballet
- Dances: Ballet

Jennifer Lauren is an American prima ballerina, artist, choreographer, rehearsal coach and dance instructor. She was a principal dancer at Miami City Ballet and retired from dancing professionally in December 2024.

Lauren danced as Odette/Odile in Alexei Ratmansky's North American premiere of Swan Lake, and originated roles in Alexei Ratmansky's The Fairy's Kiss and Symphonic Dances; Justin Peck's Heatscape; Liam Scarlett's, Viscera; Pontus Lidberg's Petrichor, among many others.

Lauren choreographed, Tchavolo Swing which was performed March 18, 2024, in collaboration with New World Symphony Fellows.

== Early life and training ==
Lauren was born in Tuscaloosa, Alabama. Lauren's mother enrolled her in ballet classes at age three. She began her formal training with regional schools including, The Royal Academy of Dance, The Dance Centre, Alabama Ballet School, and American Ballet Theatre summer programs.

== Career ==
At 16 Lauren joined Alabama Ballet as a company apprentice beginning her professional career. She danced at Alabama Ballet (1998–2007) under Artistic Director and former American Ballet Theatre principal dancer, Wes Chapman. At Alabama Ballet, Lauren performed principal roles in several full-length classics including Giselle, Firebird, Sleeping Beauty, Cinderella, Romeo and Juliet, Swan Lake, Don Quixote and others, as well as many principal Balanchine roles.

In 2007 Lauren was hired into the corps de ballet of Miami City Ballet, and in 2011 promoted to soloist by former Miami City Ballet founding artistic director Edward Villella. Lauren was named to Dance Magazine's "25 to Watch" in 2014. In 2015 Lauren was promoted to principal soloist, and in 2017 was promoted to principal ballerina by Miami City Ballet's Artistic Director Lourdes Lopez.

Lauren's repertoire at Miami City Ballet included principal roles in George Balanchine's Allegro Brillante, Apollo, A Midsummer Night's Dream, Bourrée fantasque, Concerto Barocco, Donizetti Variations, Divertimento No. 15, Jewels, The Nutcracker (Balanchine), La Sonnambula, La Source, Raymonda Variations, Scotch Symphony, Serenade, Square Dance, Stars and Stripes, Swan Lake (Balanchine), Tarantella, Theme & Variations, Tschaikovsky Pas de Deux, The Steadfast Tin Soldier, Western Symphony, Who Cares?, Valse Fantaisie (1953), as well as Jerome Robbins's, I'm Old Fashioned, Dances at a Gathering, Fancy Free, In the Night,The Concert and Brahms/Handel. Lauren also danced principal roles for works by Alexei Ratmansky, Justin Peck, Sir Kenneth MacMillan, Twyla Tharp, Paul Taylor, Christopher Wheeldon, Sir Frederick Ashton, Pontus Lidberg, Durante Verzola, Roger Van Fleteren, Alan Hineline, Jimmy Gamonet, Liam Scarlett, Brian Brooks, Richard Alston, Leslie Browne, and John Cranko.

Lauren was celebrated by Miami City Ballet following two separate performances, first on October 20, 2024, after she danced the Divertissement Pas de deux in George Balanchine's A Midsummer Night's Dream. She was honored the second time after taking her final bows as a dancer on December 24, 2024, following her performance as the Sugarplum Fairy in George Balanchine's, The Nutcracker.

Lauren began shadowing Miami City Ballet's Artistic Director Lourdes Lopez in August 2024 and teaching Miami City Ballet company class in January 2025.

== Personal life ==
In 2009, Lauren married Blake Pearson, Founder of Visu Artists.
