= Alistair Spalding =

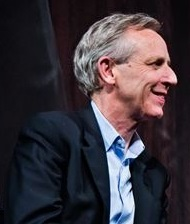
Sir Alistair Spalding

Sir Alistair Spalding CBE (born 25 August 1957, Stotfold, Bedfordshire) has been the Artistic Director and Chief Executive of Sadler's Wells theatre since 2004.

== Early career ==
Spalding's first job in arts management was at the Hawth Theatre, Crawley, where he was a programmer from 1988 to 1994.

== Southbank Centre ==
Over six years between 1994 and 2000 Spalding was the Head of Dance and Performance at the Southbank Centre in London where he developed both the presentation and commissioning of national and international dance and performance companies. As well as increasing the number of performances and audience attendance for dance at the centre he developed strong co-producing relationships with a number of national and international companies and artists including DV8, Alain Platel, Jonathan Burrows, Javier de Frutos and Rosas Dance Company. The South Bank Centre won the Time Out award for best dance production in both 1998 for Alain Platel and in 1999 for the New York Ballet Stars project.

== Sadler's Wells ==
He has been responsible for programming at the theatre since February 2000 (when he joined as Director of Programming, becoming Artistic Director and Chief Executive in October 2004). During that time he has presented companies such as Alvin Ailey American Dance Theater, Ballett Frankfurt, Tanztheater Wuppertal Pina Bausch, les ballets C de La B, Michael Clark, Dutch National Ballet, Martha Graham Dance Company, Mark Morris Dance Group, Netherlands Dance Theatre 1 and 2, and the National Ballet of China.

Under Spalding, Sadler's Wells has become a world-leading production house for dance, as well as a receiving house presenting performances by international companies. In March 2005, he announced a new commissioning and co-producing policy at Sadler's Wells, and has since appointed Matthew Bourne, Sidi Larbi Cherkaoui, Sharon Eyal, Jonzi D, Sylvie Guillem (who became Associate Artist Emeritus on retiring at the end of 2015), Akram Khan (dancer), lighting designer Michael Hulls, Michael Keegan-Dolan, Russell Maliphant, Wayne McGregor, Crystal Pite, BalletBoyz (Michael Nunn and William Trevitt), Kate Prince, Nitin Sawhney, Hofesh Shechter, Jasmin Vardimon, and Christopher Wheeldon as Associate Artists at the theatre.

He has also initiated projects such as the international festival of hip hop dance theatre Breakin' Convention; the Flamenco Festival London; the Global Dance Contest – an online competition to find new choreographic talent from around the world with Shu-Yi Chou (2010), James Wilton (2011) and Ihsan Rustem (2012) being named winners; as well as invited New Adventures, Company Wayne McGregor and ZooNation I The Kate Prince Company to become the theatre's Resident Companies. In November 2014, he appointed English National Ballet as Associate Company at Sadler’s Wells. Since then, he has also appointed Acosta Danza, Rosas and Tanztheater Wuppertal Pina Bausch as International Associate Companies. Sadler's Wells is the companies' UK home.

Spalding was appointed Commander of the Order of the British Empire (CBE) in the 2012 Birthday Honours and was knighted in the 2022 New Year Honours, both for services to dance.

== External posts ==
Spalding was Chair of Dance UK from 2004 to 2009. He was a member of the Arts Council England Dance advisory panel between 1995 and 2003 and he is an external advisor on the City University Validation Board for the Laban centre London degree courses. He was awarded Le Chevalier des Artes et Lettres by the French Embassy in October 2005. From 2009 to 2017, he was a member of Arts Council England's National Council. He has been a member of the Creative Industries Federation’s UK Council since October 2016.
