= Jovani Furlan =

Brazilian ballet dancer (born 1993 or 1994)

- Born: 1993 or 1994 (age 31–32); Joinville, Santa Catarina, Brazil
- Education: Bolshoi Theater School; Miami City Ballet School
- Occupation: ballet dancer
- Years active: 2012–present
- Career
- Current group: New York City Ballet
- Former groups: Miami City Ballet

Jovani Furlan (born 1993 or 1994) is a Brazilian ballet dancer. He joined the Miami City Ballet in 2012, and was promoted to principal dancer in 2017. In 2019, he left the company to join the New York City Ballet as a soloist, and became a principal dancer in 2022.

== Early life and training ==
Furlan was born in Joinville, Santa Catarina. He began ballet at age 11, at Bolshoi Theater School, after being urged by his grandmother. Three years after he began training, Mikhail Baryshnikov chose him to perform at Joinville Dance Festival, dancing an excerpt from The Nutcracker. When he was 17, he competed USA International Ballet Competition in Jackson, Mississippi, due to the scholarships and dance company contracts offered there. Furlan, who had little experience in solos, was eliminated after the first round, but was spotted by Edward Villella and Roma Sosenko, who offered him a scholarship at the Miami City Ballet School. Though he had never heard of the Miami City Ballet, he decided to enter the school. He trained at the school for a year, in the Balanchine technique, which he was unfamiliar with but enjoyed.

== Career ==
Furlan joined the Miami City Ballet in 2012, the year Lourdes Lopez succeeded Villella as artistic director. He was promoted to soloist in 2015 and principal dancer in 2017. At the company, he danced works by George Balanchine, Jerome Robbins, John Cranko, Twyla Tharp, Paul Taylor, Peter Martins, Christopher Wheeldon, Justin Peck, Alexei Ratmansky, Liam Scarlett and Richard Alston. Furlan danced a rarely performed solo from Balanchine's Episodes that was originated by Taylor, after learning it from Peter Frame.

In 2019, Furlan joined the New York City Ballet as a soloist. He became one of the very few dancers of the company that had never attended the affiliated School of American Ballet. The company also rarely recruits dancers from other companies. The previous year, three male principal dancers of the company had departed over sexual misconduct, in addition to Joaquin de Luz's retirement. Sensing an opportunity to fulfill his "dream of dancing at Balanchine’s house", Furlan contacted Peck, the company's resident choreographer and artistic advisor in early 2019 for a position at the company. He was offered a position after an audition. He made his company debut during the first week of the company's fall season, when he filled in for an injured dancer in Wheeldon's DGV: Danse à Grande Vitesse, in a role in which he was cast at the last minute, and partnering Megan Fairchild, with whom he had never rehearsed, after learning the role in his apartment with a suitcase in three days.

In February 2020, Furlan reprised his role in Episodes, and taught it to Michael Trusnovec, a former Paul Taylor Dance Company, who shared the role with him. This marked the first time the New York City Ballet performed the Paul Taylor solo since 1989. As a soloist, he originated roles in Peck's Rotunda (2020) and Jamar Roberts' Emanon — in Two Movements (2022). He also danced in Balanchine's Serenade, Tschaikovsky Pas de Deux, (Note: At the New York City Ballet, the composer's last name is spelled "Tschaikovsky" rather than "Tchaikovsky" as he used the former spelling during a visit to New York in 1891.) La Valse and Kammermusik No. 2, Robbins' Dances at a Gathering, In G Major and Concertino, Peck's Everywhere We Go, Wheeldon's Polyphonia, Ratmansky's Russian Seasons, and as Prince Siegfried in Swan Lake.

In 2020, during the COVID-19 pandemic, Furlan had to return to Brazil due to a visa issue. As a result, he missed out on the company return to rehearsals in small bubbles, digital commissions and the company's appearance in Saratoga Springs, New York. He returned to New York in July 2021, after 14 months in Brazil, and resumed performing in September.

In 2022, Furlan was promoted to principal dancer, following several veteran dancers' retirements.
