= Daniel Sarabia =

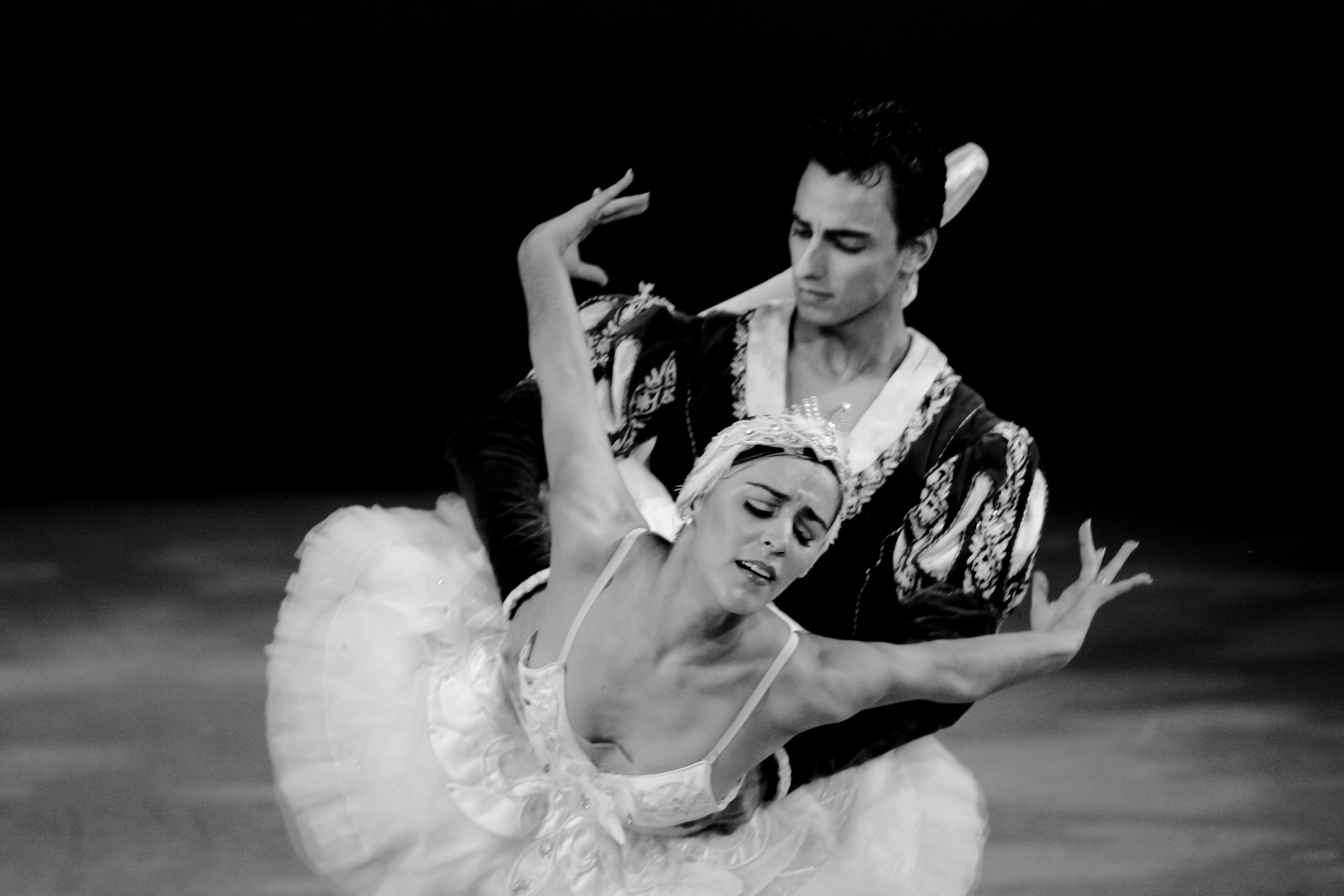
- Daniel Sarabia and Patricia Delgado in Swan Lake, with Miami City Ballet
- Born: 9 December 1984 (age 41)
- Occupation: Ballet dancer

Daniel Sarabia (born 9 December 1984, Havana, Cuba) is a Cuban ballet dancer with the Maurice Béjart Ballet of Lausanne, Switzerland.

== Biography ==
Daniel Sarabia is the son of Cuban dancer Rolando Sarabia, and his brother is currently a principal ballet dancer with the Washington Ballet, Rolando Sarabia. In an interview with Dance Magazine, Daniel explained: "Our father was our first influence and my inspiration...Ballet is in our blood."

== Life and career ==
In 1993 Daniel Sarabia joined the Provincial School of Ballet Alejo Carpentier in Havana, and graduated from the Cuban National Ballet School in 2002. He won Bronze Medal at the International Ballet Competition of Havana in 1998, the Silver Medal in 1999 and also the prize for "Young Revelation", and in 2002 he won the Gold Medal. He began his professional career with the Cuban National Ballet in 2002 under the direction of prima ballerina Alicia Alonso. After two years dancing with the company he defected in 2005 to the United States, where that year he won the Silver Medal in the New York International Ballet Competition. His brother Rolando also defected to the US, in 2006.

He has appeared in Latin America, the United States, Asia and Europe, dancing such roles as Basilio in Don Quixote, Puck in A Midsummer Night's Dream, Siegfried in Swan Lake choreography of George Balanchine, In the Night by Jerome Robbins, Three Preludes by Ben Stevenson for the Gala of Stars in Houston, Texas. He has also performed in the principal roles in such works as the Diane and Actéon Pas de Deux, the Black Swan Pas de Deux and Le Corsaire. He danced with the Boston Ballet in 2005-2006, the Miami City Ballet in 2007 and is a current dancer with the Béjart Ballet of Lausanne.

== Awards ==
- 2005 New York International Ballet Competition Silver Medal New York International Ballet Competition Winners
- 2002 International Ballet Competition of Havana Silver Medal
- 1999 International Ballet Competition of Havana Gold Medal and "Prize for Young Revelation"
- 1998 International Ballet Competition of Havana Bronze Medal and "Best Performance"
