= Johan Renvall =

Swedish dancer and choreographer

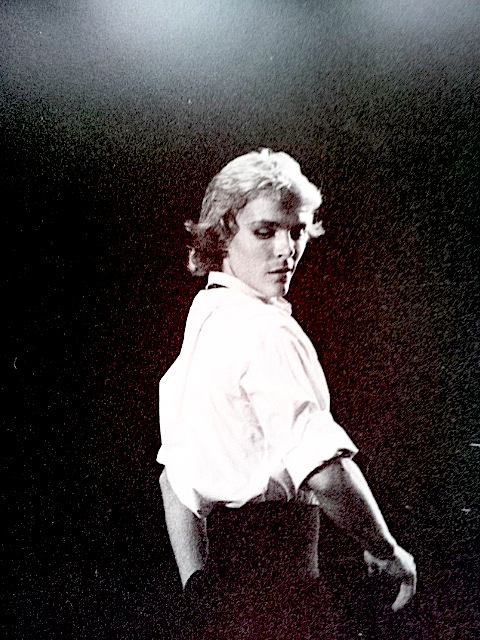
- Renvall performing a tango in 1982
- Born: Bengt Erik Johan Renvall; September 22, 1959; Stockholm, Sweden
- Died: August 24, 2015 (aged 55); Riverdale, Bronx, New York USA
- Occupation: Principal dancer at American Ballet Theatre/teacher/choreographer/actor

Bengt Erik Johan Renvall (September 22, 1959 – August 24, 2015) was a Swedish dancer and choreographer active in the United States from 1978. He was known for "soaring leaps of astounding power and soft landing", of a mixture of extraordinary bravura and lyric nuances through his performances. His career, as "one of only a small group of elite dancers the world has known", began in 1972 when he was admitted to the Royal Swedish Ballet School. He then became a member of the Royal Swedish Ballet in 1977 and of American Ballet Theatre in 1978 where he later became principal dancer.

== Early career ==
Renvall started as a figure skater at the age of 8, winning several championships and the free skating competition in the Scandinavian Junior Championship in Helsinki at the age of 11. In order to bring more softness to his skating he started taking private classes in classic dance for ballet mistress Nina Koslovski, who directly brought him to the Royal Opera Ballet School 1971, where he studied for six years. Here he received his training in classic dance, Bournonville, modern, jazz and character dance studying with notable dancers like Olga Lepeshinskaya, Konstantin Damianov, Frank Schaufuss and Fredbjorn Bjornsson.

During his first year as a member of the Swedish Royal Ballet he danced the title role in Prodigal Son by Swedish choreographer and ballet director Ivo Cramér, Superboy by Australian Walter Burke and the Jester in Kenneth MacMillan's Romeo and Juliet. He highly praised for his strong classical technique, soaring, delayed leaps and stage presence.

== American Ballet Theatre 1978–1996 ==
Renvall's association with American Ballet Theatre (ABT) began in 1978 after a guest teacher at the Swedish Royal Ballet, ABT principal dancer Alexander Minz, had scouted him. He was hired by Lucia Chase, co-founder of American Ballet Theatre and director at the time. Renvall scored many successes with the company in the U.S. and in Europe in the broad range of diverse and demanding roles in ABT's repertoire during his 18 years in the company.

In 1979, while still a member of the corps de ballet, he was selected to dance the complex leading role of the "Boy" in Antony Tudor´s Shadowplay displaying a strong technical capacity and a theatrical stage sense. Clive Barnes of The New York Post called him "a most complete dancer" describing his performance as "electrifying," and the master himself, Mr Tudor, sent the message: "Tell that damn little Swede that he was terrific."

Since this initial success Renvall soon appeared in leading roles in i.a. Tudor's Undertow and Dark Elegies, in Mikhail Baryshnikov's The Nutcracker as well as Flames of Paris and La Fille Mal Gardée and had featured roles in Theme and Variations, Concerto, La Sonnambula, and Configurations.

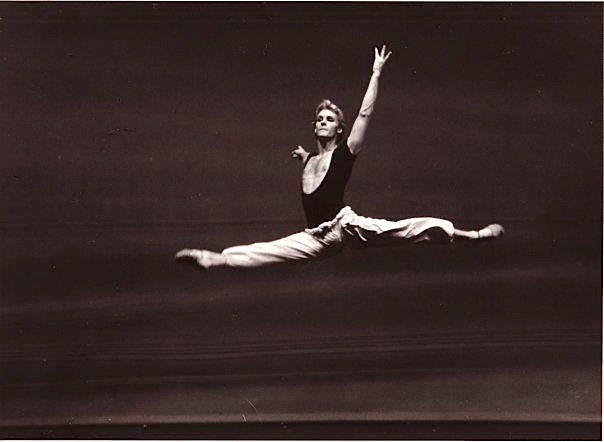
Renvall rehearsing at the Royal Swedish Opera c. 1985; photo by Enar Merkel Rydberg

In 1980, Renvall was promoted as soloist with the ABT.

When Natalia Makarova mounted La Bayadere on ABT in 1980, Renvall danced the role of the Bronze Idol. This role not only won him international praise - Clement Crisp of London Financial Times said "Johan Renvall gave a display of demi-caractere virtuosity I have rarely seen equalled: a cascade of pirouettes and aerial leaps with one leg tucked under him brought off at breathtaking speed…" - but also won him the honor of the September 1980 cover of Dance Magazine, reviewing "his truly magical apparation".

In September 1982, Dance Magazine's editor-in-chief William Como chose to make Renvall the subject of a featured article by Patricia Barnes titled "Johan Renvall: Independent Intelligence at Work".

As a guest artist Renvall appeared in major companies in the U.S. and abroad. He toured Europe in summer 1981 with Alexander Godunov's Stars of American Ballet and subsequently was featured in the summer tour 1982 of Alexander Godunov and Stars. Also in 1982 he participated in the eighth International Festival of Havanna invited by Cuban prima ballerina assoluta Alicia Alonso. His performances in Flames of Paris, Bluebird pas de deux and Three Easy Tangos prompted Dance News to describe him as the festival's "most admired male guest" In December 1982, he returned to his native Stockholm to dance before the Royal House in a nationally televised gala performance to benefit UNICEF and later at the Royal Opera in the lead role in Configuration and Giselle with Marianna Tscherkassky, principal of American Ballet Theatre. In 1987, Renvall was promoted to the rank of principal dancer, a position he held until his retirement from performing in 1996. In 1988, Renvall played the lead role in the dance TV film Dance.

== Choreography ==
In addition to his bravura dancing and dramatic sensitivity, Renvall was also an accomplished choreographer. He made his choreographic debut with an abridged version of Romeo and Juliet at The Aspen Ballet Festival in 1984. Since then, Renvall has choreographed an array of ballets and other dance works including Tango, which premiered at Jacob's Pillow Dance Festival.

His other works include Persnickety, Between the Lines and Perpetual Cycles for New Jersey Ballet and Cinderella for the Alabama Ballet/Ballet South. Recent choreography highlights include his original production of Romeo and Juliet for New Jersey Ballet, which is still part of the company's repertoire, and an original dance piece, Again Fifth, for Bodiography Contemporary Ballet, performed at the Byham Theatre in Pittsburgh, Pennsylvania. He choreographed in a wide range of dance styles for theater performances, recitals, competitions, special events and individual performers. Renvall's choreography has received praise from audiences and critics alike.

As a teacher in New York City, Renvall was a faculty member at Ballet Academy East, City Center and Broadway Dance Center, as well as ABT's Summer Intensive Program. He coached privately and his students have won medals in such high-profile competitions as the Grand Prix and the International Ballet Competition, before going on to successful dance careers. In 2008, Renvall was named "Outstanding Teacher" at the Grand Prix in Torrington, Connecticut.

== Personal life ==
Renvall was in a long-term relationship with actor and composer Tom Frueh. He died of liver failure in Riverdale, New York, on 24 August 2015 at the age of 55.
