= Valentina Kozlova =

Soviet-Russian ballet dancer (born 1957)

Valentina Kozlova (born August 26, 1957) is a Soviet-born Russian American ballerina and founder of Valentina Kozlova International Ballet Competition. In 1979, while on tour as a young principal dancer with the Bolshoi Ballet, Kozlova defected to the United States, where she became a principal dancer with New York City Ballet and later, opened her own ballet school. Perhaps best known as a lyrical and expressive ballerina, Kozlova is also renowned as a private coach, producing students who have gone on to garner prestigious prizes and positions in companies such as Boston Ballet, American Ballet Theatre, Washington Ballet, Stuttgart Ballet, Les Ballets Trockadero de Monte Carlo, Universal Ballet, and the Cuban National Ballet.

== Performing career ==
=== USSR and early career ===
Kozlova was born in Moscow to Russian parents. Encouraged by her mother, a technical supervisor for the phone company, Kozlova joined a children's ballet company at the age of seven and was accepted, at nine, into the Bolshoi Ballet School, where she studied until she was asked to join the company in 1973. She was quickly promoted to principal, in 1975, and danced all of the major classical roles.

In 1979, while in Los Angeles on tour with the Bolshoi, Kozlova and her then-husband, fellow principal dancer Leonid Kozlov, defected. They guest-starred internationally for the next few years, and Kozlova briefly became a principal dancer with The Australian Ballet. In 1982, she made her Broadway debut in the revival of On Your Toes, featuring George Balanchine's ballet Slaughter on Tenth Avenue. Balanchine asked Kozlova and Kozlov to join New York City Ballet in 1983, where she remained a principal dancer until 1995, when she left the company. While with NYCB, Kozlova was praised for her strong technique, flexibility and exuberance. Describing Kozlova's performances in Balanchine's A Midsummer Night's Dream, The New York Times' critic Anna Kisselgoff commented that her Titania "has the virtue of her strong dramatic projection and a supple quality that Russian dancers call plastique." Further, Kisselgoff notes that "the glamour and high extensions that are hallmark [...] also attracted contemporary choreographers, including Jerome Robbins, who have cast her in their works."

=== Daring Project ===
In the wake of glasnost, Kozlova returned to Moscow in 1991 to perform at the Kremlin with dancers from NYCB, New Jersey Ballet and Paul Taylor Dance Company. She returned again in 1992 to perform the premiere of a solo, "Blue Angel," created for her by American choreographer Margo Sappington.

Sappington and Kozlova immediately connected and formed a touring company together that was first called from Bolshoi to Broadway, recognizing Kozlova's own transformation, and was eventually named the Daring Project to emphasize the hybrid nature of the group; as Kozlova told The New York Times in 1996, "in each concert, members dare to perform everything from classical excerpts to sexy modern ballets."

=== Film and television ===
Her performances on video include the Pavlova Special (CBS), La Fille Mal Gardee (Philips Video, Germany), and Spartacus (VEAR Productions, Argentina).

Kozlova has also frequently appeared on television, including talk shows and entertainment programs around the world. She also appeared in a stage version of A Christmas Carol as the Ghost of Christmas Future, along with movie legend Tony Randall and Broadway star Ben Vereen, at Madison Square Garden. Peter Marks of The New York Times noted that Kozlova brought "a seasonal elegance to the proceedings."

== Dance School ==
In 2003, Kozlova founded Valentina Kozlova's Dance Conservatory of New York, where dancers are trained in the traditional Vaganova method, married with Balanchine footwork. The school annually presents their version of The Nutcracker—featuring a female Baroness Drosselmeyer—and a spring performance at New York's Symphony Space theater.

== Valentina Kozlova International Ballet Competition ==
An experienced juror at international ballet competitions, Kozlova founded her own competition in 2011. The first edition of the competition—then known as Boston International Ballet Competition—took place in Boston from May 12 to May 16, 2011, presided over by a jury made up of such acclaimed ballet professionals as Violette Verdy, Andris Liepa and Mikko Nissinen. The competition, managed by the non-profit Dance Conservatory Performance Project, aims to showcase young talent, pushing them to learn new repertory and furthering their careers by putting them in front of an esteemed jury and Artistic Board. In 2014, Ms. Kozlova expanded VKIBC to have its FIRST EDITION: Contemporary Dance and Choreography Competition in NYC, April 28-29th (2014) at Symphony Space on the Upper West Side. It is presided over by renowned judges hailing from companies like Alvin Ailey, Juilliard, Martha Graham Dance Company, and more. Currently Ms. Kozlova and her staff have expanded VKIBC into a huge international competition, with foreign semi-finals. Competitors have won numerous scholarships to dance school and summer programs, and have won contracts to companies such as Boston Ballet and Houston Ballet. Choreographers in VKIBC's Contemporary and Choreography competition have won offers to commission works for numerous international contemporary dance companies.

== See also ==
- List of Eastern Bloc defectors
