= Eleanor D'Antuono =

American ballerina and ballet coach (born 1939)

- Born: Eleanor Jacobs; 1939; Massachusetts, U.S.
- Occupations: Ballet dancer, coach
- Spouse: John B. Vrabel (m. 1986)

Eleanor D'Antuono (born 1939) is an American ballerina whose career spanned more than two decades as a principal dancer with American Ballet Theatre. She later became an influential teacher and artistic leader, serving as artistic director of the New York International Ballet Competition.

== Early life ==
Born Eleanor Jacobs in Massachusetts in 1939, D'Antuono grew up in West Roxbury, Boston, in a family rooted in both Italian and Eastern European immigrant traditions. She spent much of her childhood in the household of her maternal Italian immigrant grandparents, whose surname she later adopted professionally. On her paternal side, her family traced its origins to the former Russian Empire, and Yiddish was spoken within the extended family.

The theatre was part of her daily life. Her mother worked as a dancer, and her father was employed as a theatre manager.

At the age of four she attended a performance by the Ballet Russe de Monte Carlo, an experience that, she later recalled, fixed her ambition to become a ballerina.

From nine to fourteen she studied with E. Virginia Williams in Boston and performed with the New England Civic Ballet. Williams occasionally brought promising pupils to New York, allowing D'Antuono early exposure to professional training environments. She later studied at the School of American Ballet and earned an Associate of Arts degree from Columbia University.

== Performing career ==
At fourteen, D'Antuono joined the Ballet Russe de Monte Carlo. Touring widely across the United States, she absorbed a repertory that combined classical works with mid-century ballet innovations. Her early roles included appearances in Leonide Massine’s Blue Danube and Capriccio espagnol.

In 1960 she joined the Joffrey Ballet as a soloist, broadening her repertory and deepening her technical range.

The following year she entered Ballet Theatre (later American Ballet Theatre), where she rose to principal dancer and remained until her retirement in 1981.

At ABT she developed into a leading interpreter of the classical repertory. Her roles included Giselle, Swan Lake, The Sleeping Beauty, Les Sylphides, Theme and Variations, Spartacus, The Firebird, Raymonda, and La Bayadère.

Her 1977 performance as Giselle at New York City Center drew critical praise; The New York Times described her as “one of the glories” of the company. Over the course of her career she partnered many of the era's leading male dancers, including Rudolf Nureyev, Ivan Nagy, Fernando Bujones, Royes Fernández, Paolo Bortoluzzo and John Meehan.

During this period she declined an opportunity to appear in the 1961 film adaptation of West Side Story, choosing instead to remain committed to stage performance.

In 1978–1979 she toured five cities in the Soviet Union and appeared with the Kirov Ballet in Leningrad. She was later identified as the first American ballerina invited to perform as a special guest artist with the company.

She retired from American Ballet Theatre in 1981 at age forty-six, during the directorship of Mikhail Baryshnikov.

== Later career ==
After retiring from performance, D'Antuono turned increasingly toward coaching and artistic leadership. In the early 1980s she served as artistic director of Festival Dance Theatre in New York.

She later became artistic associate director of New Jersey Ballet and joined the faculty of the Joffrey Ballet School. Her teaching extended to the Nutmeg Conservatory for the Arts, where she coached advanced students and remained active in shaping emerging dancers.

She also served as artistic director of the New York International Ballet Competition, contributing to the international development of young dancers.

== Personal life ==
In 1986, D'Antuono married John Vrabel in Manhattan, New York City.
