= The Sorcerer's Apprentice (1955 film) =

Film by Michael Powell

- Based on: The Sorcerer's Apprentice by Johann Wolfgang von Goethe
- Directed by: Michael Powell
- Starring: Sonia Arova
- Music by: Walter Braunfels
- Country of origin: West Germany
- Original language: English

Production
- Producer: Harold Voller
- Cinematography: Christopher Challis
- Editor: Reginald Mills
- Running time: 13 minutes
- Production company: Norddeutscher Rundfunk

Original release
- Release: 1955

The Sorcerer's Apprentice is a 1955 short film made by Michael Powell for Norddeutscher Rundfunk (NDR) West German television.

It is the 1797 Goethe story of the same name presented as a ballet performed by the Frankfurt Opera with Sonia Arova as the solo dancer.
