= Liam Scarlett =

British choreographer (1986–2021)

- Born: 8 April 1986; Ipswich, Suffolk, England
- Died: 16 April 2021 (aged 35); Ipswich, Suffolk, England
- Education: Royal Ballet School
- Occupation: Choreographer

Liam Scarlett (8 April 1986 – 16 April 2021) was a British choreographer who was an artist in residence with The Royal Ballet and artistic associate with Queensland Ballet. He also choreographed new works for Ballet Black, Miami City Ballet, Norwegian National Ballet, the BalletBoyz, English National Ballet, San Francisco Ballet, American Ballet Theatre, Royal New Zealand Ballet, Atlanta Ballet, Polish National Ballet, and the Royal Ballet School.

== Early life ==
Scarlett was born on 8 April 1986 in Ipswich, and started dancing aged four. He trained at the Linda Shipton School of Dancing in Ipswich, followed by the Royal Ballet Lower School, which he entered at the age of eight, and then the Upper School.

== Choreographer ==
His first work for the main stage at the Royal Opera House in Covent Garden was Asphodel Meadows in 2010. It was a work for 20 dancers set to Poulenc's Concerto for Two Pianos. In 2008, the work was commissioned by The Royal Ballet's then director, Monica Mason, who was eager to develop his choreographic abilities.

Scarlett is the youngest choreographer to have had a full-length ballet commissioned by the Royal Ballet.

Edward Villella, the then director of Miami City Ballet, saw the dress rehearsal and commissioned Scarlett there and then. Viscera's critically acclaimed premiere took place in January 2012. As well as further work for the Royal Ballet and Miami City Ballet, Scarlett created new works for the Norwegian National Ballet, the BalletBoyz, English National Ballet, the San Francisco Ballet, American Ballet Theatre, and the Polish National Ballet.

In November 2012, aged 26, Scarlett gave up his dancing career as a first artist with The Royal Ballet, to become their first artist in residence, a post created especially for him by the Ballet's director, Kevin O'Hare.

On 29 April 2014, Scarlett's Hummingbird, inspired by Philip Glass's Tirol Concerto for Piano and Orchestra premiered at the San Francisco Ballet. In its review, The Arts Desk website's critic thought that it stood "above offerings from Wheeldon, Morris and Liang," and that Scarlett created "a fabulous, compelling visual and emotional world ... stirring stuff, and beautiful."

In August 2019, he was suspended by the Royal Ballet amid allegations of sexual misconduct against his students. An investigation found no evidence to corroborate the allegations and no criminal charges were brought against him. In March, the Royal Opera House announced Scarlett's position with the Royal Ballet had ended because he had decided to leave. Even after having been cleared the choreographer left the company nevertheless.

== Personal life and death ==
At the time of his death, Scarlett was in a relationship with dancer Fernando Duarte.

Scarlett died in his hometown of Ipswich on 16 April 2021, aged 35. No cause of death was given. However, his colleagues Dmitri Tcherniakov and Alexei Ratmansky called his death a suicide and blamed cancel culture. A day before his death, the Royal Danish Theatre had cancelled his Frankenstein show over allegations of unacceptable behaviour in 2018 and 2019. An inquest later determined suicide.

== Works ==
All for The Royal Ballet, unless otherwise noted:

- Few Things Are (2005)
- Despite (2006)
- Vayamos al Diablo (2006)
- Hinterland (2006) (Ballet Black)
- Indigo Children (2007) (Ballet Black)
- Somente (2007/8)
- Of Mozart (2008)
- Consolations and Liebestraum (2009)
- Asphodel Meadows (2010)
- Viscera (2012) (Miami City Ballet)
- Sweet Violets (2012)
- Diana and Acteon in Metamorphosis: Titian (2012)
- Euphotic (2013) (Miami City Ballet)
- Hansel and Gretel (2013)
- Promenade Sentimentale (2013) (K-Ballet)
- Serpent (2013) (BalletBoyz: The Talent)
- Firebird (2013) (Norwegian National Ballet)
- Vespertine (2013) (Norwegian National Ballet)
- The Age of Anxiety (2014)
- Hummingbird (2014) (San Francisco Ballet)
- No Man's Land (2014) (English National Ballet)
- Acheron (2014) (New York City Ballet)
- With a Chance of Rain (2014) (American Ballet Theatre)
- A Midsummer Night's Dream (2015) (Royal New Zealand Ballet and Queensland Ballet)
- Carmen (2015) (Norwegian National Ballet)
- Frankenstein (2016)
- Symphonic Dances (2017)
- Queen of Spades (2018) (Royal Danish Ballet)
- Swan Lake (2018)
- Chopin’s Concerto in E minor (2018) (Polish National Ballet)
- Dangerous Liaisons (2019) (Queensland Ballet and Texas Ballet Theater)
- Die Toteninsel (2019) (San Francisco Ballet)

== Awards ==
- Kenneth MacMillan Choreographic Award (2001)
- Ursula Moreton Choreographic Award (2003 and 2004)
- De Valois Trust Fund Choreographers' Award (2005)
