= Daniel Meja =

French dancer

Daniel Meja was born in Nice, France. He was educated at the École supérieure de danse de Cannes Rosella Hightower in Cannes, as well as in Paris, and with David Howard in New York City. He danced with the London Festival Ballet and La Scala Ballet before coming to the United States, where he danced with the Cleveland Ballet, the San Francisco Ballet, and Boston Ballet. He appeared as a guest artist with the Kirov Ballet on their 1992 tour of the United States, Canada, and Mexico. He was also a frequent guest artist with other companies, and the winner of several medals at the first New York International Ballet Competition and the Jackson International Ballet Competition. He now spends his time teaching.
