= Gorham's Bluff, Alabama =

Unincorporated community in Alabama, United States

- Unincorporated community
- Location within Alabama Location within the United States
- Coordinates: 34°44′07″N 85°50′54″W
- Country: United States
- State: Alabama
- County: Jackson
- Time zone: UTC-6 (Central (CST))
  - Summer (DST): UTC-5 (CDT)
- Area code: 256

Gorham's Bluff is an unincorporated community, approximately three miles north of Pisgah at the top of Sand Mountain. It overlooks the Tennessee River valley.

Currently, Gorham's Bluff is not a recognized town, but part of the Pisgah area. Gorham's Bluff has a six-suite lodge and nine cottages. The lodge is the only property in Alabama to be accepted into the Condé Nast Traveler guide.

Since 1997, in collaboration with the Gorham Bluff's Institute, it has served as a venue for the Alabama Ballet in their pre-season.
