= Russell Maliphant =

British choreographer

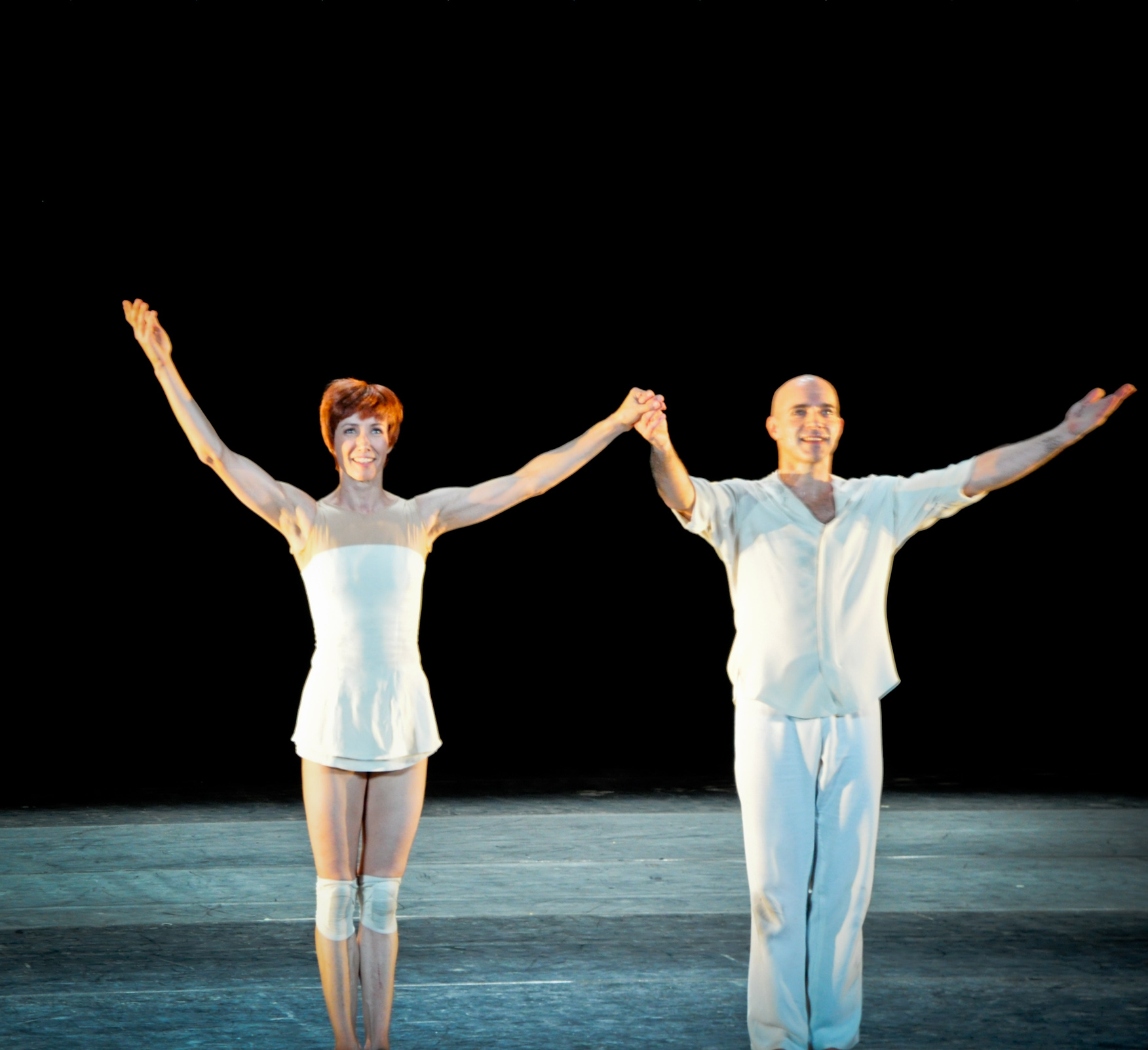
Sylvie Guillem and Russell Maliphant in 2010

Russell Scott Maliphant OBE (born 1961 in Canada) is a British choreographer. He grew up in Cheltenham and trained at the Royal Ballet School and graduated into Sadler's Wells Royal Ballet before leaving to pursue a career in independent dance. As a performer Maliphant worked with companies such as DV8 Physical Theatre, Michael Clark Company, Laurie Booth Company and Rosemary Butcher. He has studied anatomy, physiology, bio-mechanics, and the Rolfing Method of Structural Integration. In April 2000, he received an Arts Council Fellowship. He has created over 20 pieces to date, collaborating closely with lighting designer Michael Hulls, and has set works on renowned companies and artists including: Lyon Opera Ballet, Ricochet Dance Company, The Batsheva Ensemble and Ballet de Lorraine.

In 2003, Russell created Broken Fall with Sylvie Guillem and George Piper Dances and music by Barry Adamson. Broken Fall premiered at the Royal Opera House in December 2003 and was awarded an Olivier Award in 2003. Rise and Fall – an evening of work at Sadler's Wells Theatre including Broken Fall – was awarded a Critics' Circle National Dance Award for Best Choreography (Modern) in 2006.

Broken Fall marked the beginning of a collaborative relationship with Sylvie Guillem, which has seen further fruit with the award-winning Push and Solo. These two works premiered at Sadler's Wells in Autumn 2005 in a programme entitled PUSH, which has subsequently toured to sell-out audiences in France, Italy, Spain, Germany and America. The duet Push danced by Guillem and Maliphant has been presented by The Tokyo Ballet in Tokyo and on tour in Japan. Maliphant received a South Bank Show Award and an Oliver Award (2006) for the work; Guillem also received a Time Out Live Award for Solo (2006). This collaboration with Guillem continued in 2009 with the premiere of a new production, Eonnagata, created with the Canadian Director Robert Lepage.

Russell also makes work with his own company, Russell Maliphant Dance Company, which acts as his creative lab for the development and presentation of new work. In the past two years, the Company have been touring Push, reworked for and presented by two of the company dancers, alongside the new female quintet, Transmission, and a new male solo, Flux. In 2007, RMDC featured in Cast No Shadow, a new work commissioned for Performa 07 exploring the ideas of identity and migration created in collaboration with the visual artists Isaac Julien which was presented at Sadler's Wells and BAM in New York.

Afterlight, created by Maliphant for the in The Spirit of Diaghilev programme at Sadler’s Wells, won the Critics' Circle National Dance Award for Best Modern Choreography in 2010

Maliphant created Fallen for the BalletBoyz, winning the Critics’ Circle National Dance Award for Modern Choreography in 2013.

Maliphant is Associate Artist at Sadler's Wells and Wycombe Swan. In 2011, he was awarded an Honorary Doctorate of Arts by Plymouth University and in 2020 he gained his PhD from Canterbury Christ Church University, for academic research on for research on anatomy and somatic practice within choreography.

Maliphant was appointed Officer of the Order of the British Empire (OBE) in the 2023 Birthday Honours for services to dance.
