= New York International Ballet Competition =

The New York International Ballet Competition (NYIBC), was a program providing dance education and employment opportunities for young dancers ages 17 to 24. In 1983 Ilona Copen founded NYIBC, with Igor Youskevitch as first artistic director, in order to fill a void and satisfy a need in the global dance ecosystem. Other international ballet competitions existed, but New York City, considered a dance capital of the world, did not have its own.

NYIBC's mission was to discover the world's finest young ballet dancers, provide them with an extraordinary educational, mentoring and cultural experience, advance their careers by producing performances in New York City, and promote international understanding and goodwill.

NYIBC's unique format in the ballet world provided its participants with a fair level playing field, and distinguished it from all other ballet competitions. For the three-week intensive program of dance education and professional training, all 48 dancers from around the world received full scholarships to participate. The dancers learned the same choreographic version of the pas de deux and contemporary duet chosen for each progressive round. Prior to arriving to New York City, none of the dancers knew the choice of repertoire, thus increasing the fairness of the competition. The only previously planned choreography was the individual solo, performed during the second round. The tone of the three-week-long competition, therefore, was much more similar to that of a professional company than a competition. The dancers came together from across the world and learned previously unknown choreography together. At the end, the performance rounds and gala took place over the course of five days, in the Rose Theater at Jazz at Lincoln Center.

Citing financial difficulties, the competition was ended on August 23, 2014.

== Process ==
NYIBC participants lived and worked together during their three-week stay in New York. This gave them the opportunity to see what was happening technically around the world and learn from each other in a highly collaborative atmosphere.

The competition began with two weeks of technique classes and the learning and rehearsing of two classical and one contemporary pas de deux. The repertoire, chosen from a rich dance heritage, was taught by world-renowned teachers and coaches. It included the "Black Swan Pas de Deux" from Swan Lake, A Choreographic Offering by José Limón, the "Act III Pas de Deux" from Coppélia, the Fourth Movement duet from Aureole by Paul Taylor, and the Valse from Les Sylphides.

During the performance rounds, the participants performed for the public and the panel of judges. The first round was classical pas de deux, the second round a contemporary pas de deux and individual solos, and the final round was another classical partnering piece. Although they applied as couples, dancers were judged on an individual basis. All participants performed exclusively with the partner with whom they applied. Eliminations were made after each round. Dancers had to participate in all rounds unless both partners were eliminated and, if chosen, perform in the Gala Performance.

== Awards ==
The jury, composed of leading artistic figures from different countries, awarded Gold, Silver and Bronze medals accompanied by monetary prizes. In addition, the jury gave awards for special artistic achievements.

=== Igor Youskevitch Award ===
In 1996, American Ballet Theatre and NYIBC created an award to commemorate the life and work of NYIBC's first Artistic Director, Igor Youskevitch. The Igor Youskevitch Award was a one-year contract to an NYIBC participant of American Ballet Theatre's choosing.

=== Arpino Award ===
In the spring of 2004, NYIBC and the Joffrey Ballet memorialized an agreement under which the Joffrey would offer a one-year contract to an NYIBC participant. The award was offered at the discretion of the Joffrey Ballet's Artistic Director, Ashley Wheater. The award was named the Arpino Award in honor of Mr. Gerald Arpino, acclaimed choreographer, dancer and co-founder of The Joffrey Ballet.

== Notable participants ==
The following is a list of notable participants, and where they are now:

- 1984 – Victoria Mazzarelli, artistic director, The Nutmeg Conservatory for the Arts
- 1984 - Daniel Meja, former dancer with the San Francisco Ballet, Boston Ballet, and Kirov Ballet
- 1984 - Lucrèce Baillairgé, artistic director, Lyon Opera Ballet
- 1984 – Alexandre Proia, artistic director, Proia Dance Project in Atlanta; and, freelance Master Teacher and Choreographer. Formerly danced with New York City Ballet - Soloist, Martha Graham Dance Company and Boston Ballet; and, former artistic director at The Georgia Ballet.
- 1987 – Kenneth Greve, Artistic Director, Finnish National Ballet
- 1987 – José Manuel Carreño, Performing Artist, Master Teacher and Artistic Director of Carreño Dance Festival, former soloist at the American Ballet Theatre and principal at the Boston Ballet
- 1987 – Maximiliano Guerra, Director, Choreographer and Principal Dancer at Ballet del Mercosur and Co-Owner/Director of Fábrica de Arte
- 1987 – Xin Lili, Artistic Director, Shanghai Ballet
- 1987 – Anders Nordström, Principal Dancer, Royal Swedish Ballet
- 1987 – Yang Xin Hua, Director, Shanghai Ballet School
- 1990 – Barry Hughson, executive director, Boston Ballet
- 1990 – Diliana Nikiforova, Prima Ballerina, Sofia National Opera and Ballet
- 1990 – Silvina Perillo, Principal Dancer, Ballet Estable del Teatro Colón
- 1996 – Gillian Murphy, Principal Dancer, American Ballet Theatre and Principal Guest Artist, Royal New Zealand Ballet
- 1996 - Carlos Molina, Freelance Dancer, former soloist at the American Ballet Theatre and Principal at the Boston Ballet
- 2000 – Mikhail Ilyin, Principal Dancer, Miami City Ballet, and at the ABT;Sarah Lamb, Principal Dancer, The Royal Ballet
- 2003 – Cesar Morales, Principal Dancer, Birmingham Royal Ballet
- 2003 – Ludmila Pagliero, Danseuse Étoile, Paris Opera Ballet
- 2003 – Victoria Jaiani, Company Member, The Joffrey Ballet
- 2003 – Kathleen Breen Combes, Principal Dancer, Boston Ballet
- 2005 - Daniel Sarabia, Dancer, Maurice Béjart Ballet
- 2005 – Joseph Gatti, Soloist, Boston Ballet
- 2005 – Gleidson Soares Vasconcelos, Company Member, Ballet Arizona
- 2005- Xuan Cheng,[Principal dancer], [Oregon Ballet Theatre]
- 2007 - Elina Miettinen, Corps de Ballet, American Ballet Theatre
- 2007 – Eun-Ji Ha, Principal Dancer, Finnish National Ballet
- 2007 – Wu Husheng, First Principal Dancer, Shanghai Ballet
- 2007 – Paulo Arrais, Principal Dancer, Boston Ballet
- 2009 – Amber Neumann, Company Member, The Joffrey Ballet
- 2009 – John Mark Giragosian, Company Member, The Joffrey Ballet
- 2009 – Ricardo Santos, Company Member, The Joffrey Ballet
