= George Piper Dances =

George Piper Dances is a London-based contemporary dance company.

George Piper Dances was founded in 2001 by Michael Nunn and William Trevitt, both dancers with The Royal Ballet.
