= Chen Zhenrong =

Chinese ballet dancer

Chen Zhenrong (陳真榮) is a Chinese ballet dancer. He is a principal dancer for the Shanghai Ballet Company.

== Prizes and distinctions ==
- He was awarded the bronze medal in the 1st National Ballet Competition of China in 1985.
- Prize for Encourage in Shanghai Dance Competition in 1991.
- He danced leading roles in Swan Lake, Giselle, Romeo and Juliet, the Nutcracker, the White-haired Girl, The Butterfly Lovers, Coppelia, La Sylphide, Sleeping Beauty, The Latest Time, etc.
- He danced at many locals in China, including Hong Kong, Taiwan and Macau, he also made many international visits promoting Chinese ballet.
- He appeared in a Shanghai TV dancing show.

== Biography ==
Chen Zhenrong (陳真榮) was born in Suzhou, Jiangsu province, People's Republic of China. In 1978 he started his dancing career at People's Liberated Army Jinan Qianwei Dance Ensemble in Shandong province. He was admitted to the Beijing Dance Academy for ballet study in 1978. After graduation in 1987, Zhenrong Chen joined the Shanghai Ballet Company and was promoted to be Principal Dancer in 1990.

In 2004, he is a National Grade 1 Actor of People's Republic of China, Principal Dancer and Tutor for Shanghai Ballet Company.
