= On Your Toes =

Musical

- Original promotional material
- Music: Richard Rodgers
- Lyrics: Lorenz Hart
- Book: Richard Rodgers; George Abbott; Lorenz Hart
- Productions: 1936 Broadway; 1939 Film; 1954 Broadway revival 1983 Broadway revival
- Awards: 1983 Tony Award for Best Reproduction; 1983 Drama Desk Award for Outstanding Revival

On Your Toes (1936) is a musical with a book by Richard Rodgers, George Abbott, and Lorenz Hart, music by Rodgers, and lyrics by Hart. It was adapted into a film in 1939.

While teaching music at Knickerbocker University, Phil "Junior" Dolan III tries to persuade Sergei Alexandrovich, the director of the Russian Ballet, to stage the jazz ballet Slaughter on Tenth Avenue. After becoming involved with the company's prima ballerina Vera Barnova, Junior is forced to assume the male lead in Slaughter. Trouble ensues when he becomes the target of two thugs hired by Vera's lover and dance partner to kill him.

On Your Toes marked the first time a Broadway musical made dramatic use of classical dance and incorporated jazz into its score.

== Background ==
On Your Toes originally was conceived as a film, and as a vehicle for Fred Astaire. His refusal of the part, because he thought that the role clashed with his debonair image developed in his contemporary films, caused it to be presented initially as a stage production. Richard Rodgers wrote: "Astaire at that point in his career was a pretty chic fellow who usually wore white ties and tails, and the producers felt that there was no chance in our script for him to appear that way." Astaire thought that the ballet background in the plot was too "highbrow" for his audiences. Ray Bolger was given the stage role, which allowed him to rise to stardom. Eddie Albert, not known as a dancer in his career, gave a remarkable performance opposite Vera Zorina in the 1939 film.

== Productions ==
The first Broadway production, directed by C. Worthington Miner and choreographed by George Balanchine, opened on April 11, 1936, at the Imperial Theatre, where it ran for seven months, then transferred to the Majestic, for a total run of 315 performances. The cast included Ray Bolger (Junior), Tamara Geva (Vera Barnova), and Monty Woolley (Sergei Alexandrovitch).

The London West End production opened on February 5, 1937, at the Palace Theatre, with Jack Whiting (Junior) and Vera Zorina (Vera Barnova).

The first Broadway revival, directed by Abbott and choreographed by Balanchine, opened on October 11, 1954, at the 46th Street Theatre, where it ran for 64 performances. The cast included Vera Zorina, Bobby Van, Elaine Stritch, and David Winters. The original score was embellished with "You Took Advantage of Me," sung by Stritch.

The second revival, directed by Abbott and choreographed by Donald Saddler, started in 1982 with national previews. One of the original cast members, Natalia Makarova, was injured during the preview at the John F. Kennedy Center in Washington, D.C. Valentina Kozlova filled in the role, and Leonid Kozlov, her former husband, replaced George de la Peña to complete the previews. After seven previews, the revival opened on March 6, 1983, at the Virginia Theatre with the original cast, where it ran for 505 performances. The cast included Natalia Makarova, Christine Andreas, George de la Peña, George S. Irving, Dina Merrill, Philip Arthur Ross, Betty Ann Grove and Lara Teeter. Makarova won a Tony Award for Best Actress in a musical.

Hans Spialek had orchestrated On Your Toes and several other Rodgers-and-Hart musicals in the 1930s; in 1982 he was engaged to reconstruct his original orchestrations for the revival. In 1983 he told the New York Times, "'On Your Toes' was 47 years ago. You know how much was lost, how much was trampled on, how much was smashed, how much you had to restore it? You might say I have a pretty good memory." He also reported, "You have no more real orchestral sound in musical comedy. I think it's those microphones—they ruin the natural color."

The same production opened at the Palace Theatre, London on June 12, 1984, starring Natalia Makarova, Tim Flavin, Siobhan McCarthy and Honor Blackman; it received rave reviews and ran for 539 performances, closing on 17 October 1985, with its backing "angels" losing about 80% of their investments.

In 2013, New York City Center's Encores! produced a limited run of On Your Toes, directed and choreographed by Warren Carlyle, with music direction by Rob Fisher, and Susan Pilarre staging Slaughter on Tenth Avenue.

Slaughter on Tenth Avenue was revived by George Balanchine as a stand-alone ballet in 1968 and has been in the repertoire of New York City Ballet ever since.

== Roles and original cast ==
The main characters in the 1936 Broadway production were as follows:

- Phil Dolan II – Dave Jones
- Lil Dolan – Ethel Hampton
- Phil Dolan III, a.k.a. Junior – Tyrone Kearney, Ray Bolger
- Call Boy – Beau Tilden
- Lola – Betty Jane Smith
- Frankie Frayne – Doris Carson
- Sidney Cohn – David Morris
- Vera Barnova – Tamara Geva
- Anushka – Mae Noble
- Peggy Porterfield – Luella Gear
- Sergei Alexandrovitch – Monty Woolley
- Konstantine Morrosine – Demetrios Vilan
- Snoopy – William Wadsworth
- Mishka – Valery Streshnev
- Vassili – Robert Sidney
- Dimitri – Basil Galahoff
- Leon – Harold Haskin
- Call Boy – Bob Long

== Synopsis ==
Act I

On a vaudeville stage, Phil Dolan II, his wife Lili, and his son Junior perform their nightly routine, but afterwards in the dressing room, the parents tell Junior that he must go to school—his mother is worried that the chorus girls taking an interest in him will corrupt him, since he has an exceptionally strong libido. Fifteen years later, as predicted, Junior is a music teacher at Knickerbocker University. He has two talented students: Sidney Cohn and Frankie Frayne. Sidney has written a promising jazz ballet which Frankie catches Junior dancing to alone in the classroom (uncovering his "secret past"), and she trades an introduction to the Russian Ballet's manager in return for his listening to her song.

In the apartment of Vera Baranova, star of the Russian Ballet, Peggy, the manager, enthusiastically tells Sergei, the company's director, about the new jazz ballet. He is not interested in anything new - he doesn't even recognise that the Revolution has happened! Junior arrives as Vera and co-star/unfaithful lover Konstantine Morrosine are having a Russian screaming match. The others leave, so that Vera and Junior can discuss the new ballet. Liking what she sees, Vera pulls a very confused Junior into bed with her, and in spite of his growing love for Frankie, he succumbs to her siren seduction.

Back in the classroom, Frankie is jealous of Junior's stories about Vera and the Russians (Peggy has promised him a chance to dance in the corps de ballet). Now it's Frankie's turn to play seductress, even the score, and they find a small hotel with a wishing well. At the opening of the ballet, La Princesse Zenobia, Junior is told that one of the dancers is in jail and he must take his place, but onstage he gets all his steps, rhythms and positions cock-eyed and makes a laughing-stock of the ballet. But the audience loves it, nevertheless.

Act II

Sergei, Peggy, Vera, Morrosine and Junior have listened to the jazz ballet. Opinions are mixed, and Vera and Morrosine are still arguing, as he becomes increasingly jealous of Junior. Poor Junior has got love problems, too: he upsets Frankie by going to lunch with Vera (for business reasons) instead of her, but she is "Glad to Be Unhappy".

Then Peggy, Sergei, and some of the company visit Junior's school. Sergei has come to break the bad news that he will not be doing the jazz ballet, but Peggy persuades him by threatening to pull out the million dollars she has put into the company. After Sergei's announcement that the next production will be Slaughter on Tenth Avenue, the class stages the title number "On Your Toes", in which the students' jazz and the company's classical routines are deftly combined.

At a rehearsal, Morrosine's jealousy of Junior escalates, he fights with Sergei and is knocked–out, suddenly making Junior the new star. The humiliated Morrosine plots with his gangster friend, Louie, to shoot Junior at the end of the performance. Joe, the stage doorman, overhears and warns Frankie. On-stage, Junior is tipped–off by her, and signals to the conductor to avoid the final loud climax which would cover the shot, so he keeps the orchestra playing the last few bars of the music over and over as Junior dances frantically to keep the shooter from firing until the police arrest him. After the curtain call, Frankie embraces Junior and is startled to see his parents waiting to congratulate him. Junior chooses Frankie over Vera, asks her never to leave him. The music-teacher has made it back to his home-ground - the stage.

== Original song list ==
Act I

- "Two a Day for Keith" – Phil Dolan II, Lili, Junior
- "Questions and Answers (The Three Bs)" – Junior, Students
- "It's Got to Be Love" – Frankie, Junior, Students
- "Too Good for the Average Man" – Peggy, Sergei
- "There's a Small Hotel" – Junior, Frankie
- Princesse Zenobia Ballet – Orchestra

Act II

- "The Heart Is Quicker than the Eye" – Peggy, Junior
- "Quiet Night" – Students
- "Glad to Be Unhappy" – Frankie
- "On Your Toes" – Frankie, Students
- Slaughter on Tenth Avenue – Orchestra

== Awards and nominations ==
=== 37th Tony Awards ===
- Tony Award for Best Revival (winner)
- Tony Award for Best Actress in a Musical (Natalia Makarova, winner)
- Tony Award for Best Featured Actor in a Musical (Lara Teeter, nominee)
- Tony Award for Best Featured Actress in a Musical (Christine Andreas, nominee)
- Tony Award for Best Choreography (nominee)
- Theatre World Award (Natalia Makarova, winner)
- Drama Desk Award for Outstanding Revival (winner)
- Drama Desk Award for Outstanding Actress in a Musical (Natalia Makarova, winner)
- Drama Desk Award for Outstanding Choreography (nominee)
- Drama Desk Award for Outstanding Director of a Musical (winner)
- Drama Desk Award for Outstanding Orchestrations (winner)
- Drama Desk Award for Outstanding Costume Design (nominee)

== Film adaptation ==
In 1939, Warner Bros. Pictures filmed On Your Toes as adapted by Sig Herzig and Lawrence Riley and written by Richard Macauley and Jerry Wald, with Ray Enright directing. The film stars ballerina Vera Zorina (billed as Zorina), Eddie Albert, Alan Hale and Frank McHugh, and features Leonid Kinskey, Gloria Dickson, James Gleason, Erik Rhodes, Berton Churchill and Donald O'Connor.

Although some of the songs from the Broadway score were used as background music, the film does not have any singing in it. The Slaughter on Tenth Avenue ballet does appear at the end of the film, with choreography by George Balanchine, one of eight films for which he created the dances. Eddie Albert's character dances the lead in the ballet, opposite Zorina. According to John Reid, "Albert is no dancer...But with the aid of a visual double for one or two shots plus post-synched taps, he actually manages rather well, and even duets with the great Zorina with reasonable facility."

Gene Kelly and Vera-Ellen perform an abbreviated version of the ballet in the biopic Words and Music.
