= Maria Caruso =

American dancer, choreographer, academic, and entrepreneur

Maria Angelica Caruso (born 1980) is an American dancer, choreographer and entrepreneur. She is the founding director of Bodiography, an umbrella organization that includes dance performance companies, a conservatory, and related fitness and wellness initiatives. She has served as chair of the Performing Arts Department at La Roche University.

== Early life and education ==
Maria Caruso grew up in Rural Valley, Pennsylvania, outside of Pittsburgh. Her parents separated when she was young, and she began studying dance at an early age. Caruso graduated from high school at age 16. She earned a Bachelor's degree in performing arts and dance from Florida State University and a Master's degree in professional leadership with an emphasis on management of nonprofit organizations from Carlow University. At age 18, she received a scholarship to spend a summer with Dance Theater of Harlem. Following this experience, Caruso founded a dance company with the intention of prioritizing technical rigor, musicality, and choreographic aesthetic over conventional body-type expectations in classical and contemporary dance.

== Career ==
As a choreographer, Caruso has created numerous ballets performed by Bodiography artists and by professional dance companies internationally. Her choreographic work has been commissioned or presented by companies including Graham 2, Cisne Negro Companhia de Dança, and ARB Dance Company. She has also worked internationally as a master teacher but is primarily associated with solo stage performance and the development of creative enterprises across the performing arts, media production, and fashion. In 2020, she founded M-Train Productions, followed in 2022 by the establishment of Ria Angelica Entertainment (RAE Films).

Caruso’s performance career includes collaborations with artists such as Anjali Austin, Ilana Suprun Clyde, Ze’eva Cohen, Lynne Taylor-Corbett, Johan Renvall, and James Martin. After retiring from full-time ensemble dancing with Bodiography Contemporary Ballet in 2015, she shifted her focus toward solo performance and interdisciplinary work, touring internationally. In 2017, Caruso created her first full-length mixed-genre solo concert, Phoenix Rising, incorporating dance forms outside her prior performance repertoire. In 2018, she received a license from Martha Graham Resources to perform Martha Graham’s Lamentation, which she has since presented in select solo performances.

Also in 2018, Caruso premiered a new solo work, Metamorphosis, at the Karmiel Dance Festival in Israel. The work toured internationally across four continents between 2018 and early 2020. In 2021, Caruso returned to live performance in New York City presenting, Metamorphosis, off-Broadway. During the same period, she also performed, Rearview Mirror, at a separate off-Broadway venue. Following its New York engagement, Metamorphosis, toured internationally from late 2021 through mid-2022 and was later presented in a limited engagement in London’s West End at the Lyric Theatre, London. In 2024, Caruso premiered a subsequent solo work, Incarnation, at the Theatre Royal, Drury Lane. The production completed an international tour in 2025. In May of 2026, Caruso premiered a third solo show, Counterpoint of Chaos, at His Majesty's Theatre in the West End.

She has also held academic leadership roles, serving as Chair of the Performing Arts Department at La Roche University.

== Bodiography ==
Caruso founded Bodiography Contemporary Ballet in New York City in 2000 and relocated the company to Pittsburgh in 2001. The organization later established operations in the Squirrel Hill neighborhood of Pittsburgh, Pennsylvania, in a facility associated with Gene Kelly’s former dance studio. Over time, Bodiography expanded to include performance, training, and wellness programming.

The organization’s performance division, Bodiography Contemporary Ballet, presents repertory based in classical ballet technique and incorporating contemporary movement styles. Bodiography also operates the Bodiography Center for Movement, which offers youth training and public classes, including a college preparatory program developed in collaboration with La Roche University.

Caruso also developed two movement-based systems associated with the organization. The Bodiography Fitness and Strength Training System is a mat-based conditioning program that uses props and is taught by certified instructors in fitness and dance settings in the United States. Instructional content from the program became available through digital distribution beginning in 2019.

== Notable works ==
- Carmina Burana (2012, 2016)
- Rearview Mirror (2019, 2021)
- Metamorphosis (2021)
- Incarnation (2024)
