= Leonid Kozlov =

Russian ballet dancer (born 1947)

Leonid Kozlov (born February 6, 1947, in Moscow, Soviet Union) is a former principal dancer of the Bolshoi and New York City Ballet. He is also a choreographer, founder, and owner of Kozlov Dance International (KDI) and Youth Dance Festival of New Jersey.

== Biography ==
Kozlov started his dance career by training at the Bolshoi Ballet School at age 12, after he was picked out from his primary school class and told he was to become a dancer. He later joined the Bolshoi company and became a principal dancer, performing lead roles in Romeo and Juliet, Swan Lake, Don Quixote, Giselle, Le Corsaire, The Stone Flower, Spartacus, The Sleeping Beauty, and La Bayadère.

Kozlov met his former wife, Valentina Kozlova, then an apprentice, during the Bolshoi's tour of Paquita in America in 1973. They married later that year. He and Kozlova decided to defect together on September 16, 1979, when they walked out of a garage door at Shrine Auditorium in Los Angeles after a tour performance. After asylum was granted to them on September 17, they started their lives in the United States by performing as guest artists internationally in Britain, South America, Australia and across North America. With those international tours, Kozlov had opportunities to work with famous choreographers including George Balanchine, Jerome Robbins, George Abbott, Glen Tetley, and Alvin Ailey.

Kozlov staged his first Nutcracker production for the Australian Ballet at the Sydney Opera House in 1981. The following year, he choreographed the Australian Ballet's first commissioned Nutcracker, which premiered at the Palais Theatre on October 8, 1982. He also staged other productions: Swan Lake and Don Quixote for National Ballet of Chile; and for New Jersey Ballet.

In 1983, Kozlov starred in the national previews of the Broadway revival of Roger & Hart’s On Your Toes. He was then invited by Balanchine to become a principal dancer with New York City Ballet. Over the 11 years he was with the company, he established a repertoire of over 30 ballets.

On March 1, 1991, Kozlov performed in Moscow again for the first time after his defection as part of Stars of American Ballet, which featured American choreographers and dancers from New York City Ballet, New Jersey Ballet, and Paul Taylor Dance Company in the 6,000-seat theater at the Kremlin Palace of Congresses.

Currently, Kozlov is an Artistic Advisor to New Jersey Ballet and director of Kozlov Dance International.

== Kozlov Dance International ==
While Kozlov was a principal dancer of New York City Ballet, he founded Kozlov Dance International (KDI) in 1991 based in Ridgewood, New Jersey. The mission of the company was to develop students into professional-level dancers and to bring awareness of art and culture to local communities. KDI's repertory included The Nutcracker, Swan Lake (Act II), Don Quixote, Giselle (Act II), Paquita, The Firebird, La Vivandiere, Chopiniana, Pas de Quatre, and Kozlov's original works. Students of Kozlov have gone on to dance with companies such as New Jersey Ballet, Philadelphia Ballet, Washington Ballet, Boston Ballet, Alberta Ballet, and more.

In 2008, Kozlov staged the first Nutcracker production to be performed in Aruba, featuring dancers of KDI alongside several guest artists. In 2013, Kozlov relocated to Aruba, where he and his wife opened Kozlov Dance Academy.

Kozlov founded Youth Dance Festival of New Jersey in 2005. It is an annual dance competition in classical ballet, contemporary dance, jazz, folk dance and Irish step dance for dancers aged 9–21 with participation from more than 150 dance schools.
