= Pontus Lidberg =

Swedish born choreographer

Pontus Karl Johan Lidberg
- Born: 1977 (age 48–49)
- Occupations: Choreographer, Dancer and Filmmaker
- Website: www.lidberg.se/pontus/

Pontus Karl Johan Lidberg is a Swedish born choreographer, dancer and filmmaker.

== Early life and education ==
Born in Stockholm, Sweden to psychiatrist Lars Lidberg and psychologist Yvonne Lidberg, Lidberg began classical ballet training at the age of four. He has a M.F.A. in contemporary performative arts from the University of Gothenburg, Academy of Music and Drama, Sweden.

== Choreographer ==
Lidberg has created works for dance companies including Acosta Danza, BalletBoyz, Le Ballet du Grand Théâtre de Genève, Les Ballets de Monte Carlo, Miami City Ballet, Morphoses, New York City Ballet, Paris Opera Ballet, Royal Danish Ballet, Royal Swedish Ballet, Semperoper Ballett and Wiener Staatsballett, as well as for his own company Pontus Lidberg Dance. Pontus Lidberg Dance has been presented at venues such as The Joyce Theater, The Havana International Ballet Festival The National Arts Center of Canada, La Biennale di Venezia and Festival Oriente-Occidente in Rovereto, Italy. His choreography "Roaring Twenties" opened the 2022 Montpellier Danse Festival.

In 2016 he was commissioned by Library of Congress to create a new work for the Martha Graham Dance Company, as the centerpiece for a celebration marking the Library's 90th anniversary as a presenter of the performing arts.

Lidberg has been Artist-in-Residence at Harvard, Headlands Center for the Arts, Baryshnikov Arts Center, a choreography fellow at New York City Center, and a fellow at the Center for Ballet and the Arts at New York University. He received a 2019 John Simon Guggenheim Fellowship in Choreography. During the 2025–2026 academic year, Lidberg was artist-in-residence in Harvard Medical School's Master of Science in Media, Medicine, and Health program, where he taught a graduate course and mentored students.

He was the artistic director of Danish Dance Theatre between 2018 and 2022. In December 2024, Lidberg became director of Ballet Nice Méditerranée, succeeding Éric Vu-An. In 2026, he was named a Chevalier of the Ordre des Arts et des Lettres by the French Ministry of Culture.

== Filmmaker ==
In 2007, Lidberg directed The Rain, a film featuring Alicia Vikander that takes place in a ceaseless rainfall. The New York Times wrote: "Memorably The Rain illustrates what filmed dance can say that staged dance cannot".

His subsequent film Labyrinth Within, featured Lidberg himself, former New York City Ballet principal dancer Wendy Whelan and Giovanni Bucchieri. It won the 2012 Jury Prize for Best Picture at the Dance on Camera Festival in New York City. During his 2012 tenure as resident artistic director of Morphoses, Lidberg developed the film into an hourlong work of live performance and film titled Within (Labyrinth Within), premiering at the 2012 Jacob's Pillow Dance Festival.

His third film, Written on Water, premiered in 2021 at Le Festival International du Film sur l'Art in Montréal. Filming began in Paris in 2019 after a successful Kickstarter fundraising of £30,835. Starring Aurélie Dupont, Alexander Jones and Lidberg himself, it is an 81-minute feature film about an artist whose happy and comfortable married life is upended when she unexpectedly falls in love with someone else. Written on Water aims to convey the drama of desire and the turmoil of the protagonist's inner life through dance, evocative cinematography, and music.

== Works ==
- Moonrise, Ballet Nacional Chileno (2024)
- El peso del instante, Ballet Nacional de Cuba (2024)
- On the Nature of Rabbits, La Biennale di Venezia (2023)
- Petrichor, Miami City Ballet (2023)
- Roaring Twenties, Danish Dance Theatre (2022)
- Centaur, Danish Dance Theatre (2020), winner of Lumen Prize Nordic Award
- Between Dogs and Wolves, Wiener Staatsoper Ballett (2020)
- Les Noces, Paris Opera Ballet (2019)
- Siren, Pontus Lidberg Dance and Danish Dance Theatre (2018)
- Paysage, Soudain, La Nuit, Acosta Danza (2018)
- Une Autre Passion, Le Ballet du Grand Théâtre de Genève (2017)
- The Shimmering Asphalt, New York City Ballet (2017)
- Woodland, Martha Graham Dance Company (2016)
- Rabbit, Balletboyz (2016)
- Summer's Winter Shadow, Les Ballets de Monte Carlo (2015)
- Little Match Girl Passion, Westminster College Choir (2015)
- Untitled, American Ballet Theatre Studio Company (2015)
- SNOW, Pontus Lidberg Dance (2013, revised 2015)
- Raymonda, Royal Swedish Ballet (2014)
- Im Anderen Raum, Semperoper Ballett Dresden (2013)
- Stream, Oregon Ballet Theatre (2013)
- Giselle, Ballet du Grand Théâtre de Genève (2012), Theater Basel (2022)
- Within (Labyrinth Within), Morphoses (2012)
- Faune, Pontus Lidberg Dance (2011)
- Vespertine, Morphoses (2010)
- Warriors, Pontus Lidberg Dance (2010)
- Exit, Pursued by a Bear, Royal Danish Ballet (2010)
- Luminous, Beijing Dance Theatre (2009)
- Tactile Affinity, Stockholm 59° North: Soloists of The Royal Swedish Ballet (2009)
- Heart of Silk, Skånes Dansteater (2009)
- Transformations, NorrDans (2008)
- Metamorphose one, Morphoses the Wheeldon Company (2008)
- Light in a Night's Coat, Norwegian National Ballet (2005)
- Duet for Dancer and Pianist, Pontus Lidberg Dance (2004)
