= Rolando Sarabia =

Cuban-born American ballet dancer (born 1982)

- Born: Rolando Sarabia Oquendo; 18 August 1982 (age 43)
- Occupation: Ballet dancer

Rolando Sarabia Oquendo (born 18 August 1982) is a Cuban-born American ballet dancer. He was an acclaimed Principal Dancer for The Washington Ballet under artistic director Julie Kent and former artistic director Septime Webre. He has danced with many companies including the Cuban National Ballet, the Houston Ballet, Miami City Ballet, and American Ballet Theatre as a guest artist in 2011. Erika Kinetz of The New York Times called him the "Cuban Nijinsky" and compared him to the young Mikhail Baryshnikov. In 2021 he was named the artistic director of Roanoke Ballet Theatre.

== Life and career ==
Sarabia was born in Havana, Cuba, on 18 August 1982. His father was a ballet dancer with the Cuban National Ballet. Rolando grew up, among ballet dancers and was performing with the Cuban National Ballet since the age of 5.

In 1990, he was admitted as a student at the Alejo Carpentier Elementary Ballet School in Havana, Cuba. Was trained by Rolando Sarabia (his father), Alicia Alonso, Lázaro Carreño and Magaly Suarez, at the National Ballet School in Havana. Early in his career, Sarabia's explosive performance style garnered comparisons to Nijinsky and Baryshnikov. Sarabita was so famous among young people in Cuba, that according to Sarah Kaufman of The Washington Post his fans "glued him the suffix of endearment, -ita, onto his name like a kiss."

Hailed by The New York Times as the 'Cuban Nijinsky'. Rolando defected from Cuba in 2005, a year after his brother Daniel Sarabia, also a former dancer with Cuban National Ballet, entered the United States via Mexico. Sarabia left Cuba, after Prima Ballerina Alicia Alonso refused to allow him to join the Boston Ballet where his younger brother Daniel Sarabia was dancing as a corps member.

He has performed with renowned dancers as Maya Plisetskaya, Patrick Dupont, Farouk Ruzimatov, Alicia Alonso, Tamara Rojo, among many others.

In July 2021, Sarabia announced his retirement from The Washington Ballet. He is now the artistic director of Roanoke Ballet Theatre.

== Awards ==
- 2011 – Prix Benois de la Danse, Moscow, Russia
- 1998 – Grand Prix 1998, Concours International de Danse de Paris, Paris, France
- 1998 – Grand Prix 1998, Varna International Ballet Competition, Varna, Bulgaria
- 1998 – Junior Division, Gold Medal USA International Ballet Competition in Jackson, Mississippi
- 1998 – Gold Medal 1998 International Ballet Competition in Nagoya, Japan
- 1998 – Grand Prix 1998 International Encounter of Ballet Academies. Havana, Cuba
- 1995 – Grand Prix 1995 International Encounter of Ballet Academies. Havana Cuba
- 1994 – Gold Medal and Prize for Young Revelation, in 1994 Competition at Mercosur in Brazil
