= Three Preludes (ballet) =

Ballet by Mark Morris

Three Preludes is a ballet by Mark Morris to eponymous music by George Gershwin for his own company and presented as a piece d'occasion by the New York City Ballet. The performance took place June 16, 1992, at the New York State Theater, Lincoln Center and featured Mikhail Baryshnikov.
