= Shanghai Ballet Company =

State ballet company for Shanghai, China

General information
- Name: Shanghai Ballet Company
- Year founded: 1966
- Website: www.shanghaiballet.com

The Shanghai Ballet Company is the state ballet company for Shanghai. This regional dance troupe organized in 1966 (though they did not settle on the name "Shanghai Ballet" until 1979). They perform a blend of traditional and Western dance styles. The troupe is known for their performances of The White Haired Girl.

== History ==
The troupe tours internationally. During the 1977 and the 1984 tours, members of the troupe defected, one in the US and one in Canada.

The Shanghai Ballet was formally renamed in 1979 at the base of The White-haired Girl performing team, which won the Gold Medal of the Best Classical Dance Works of the 20th Century in China.

In August 2013, the Company interpreted Jane Eyre for its first show ever in the UK, at the London Coliseum. In December 2015, the Shanghai Ballet Company played The Greatest Swan Lake in the World, directed by Derek Deane, at the Stardust Theatre in Amsterdam. In August 2016, the Company played Echoes of Eternity, directed by Patrick de Bana, at the London Coliseum. In January 2020, the Shanghai Ballet made its debut in New York at Lincoln Center, dancing Swan Lake.

According to Andrea Beck, writer of The Diplomat, showcasing the Shanghai Ballet Company in London is a soft power diplomatic instrument for China to smoothen its image in the UK.

== Repertoire ==
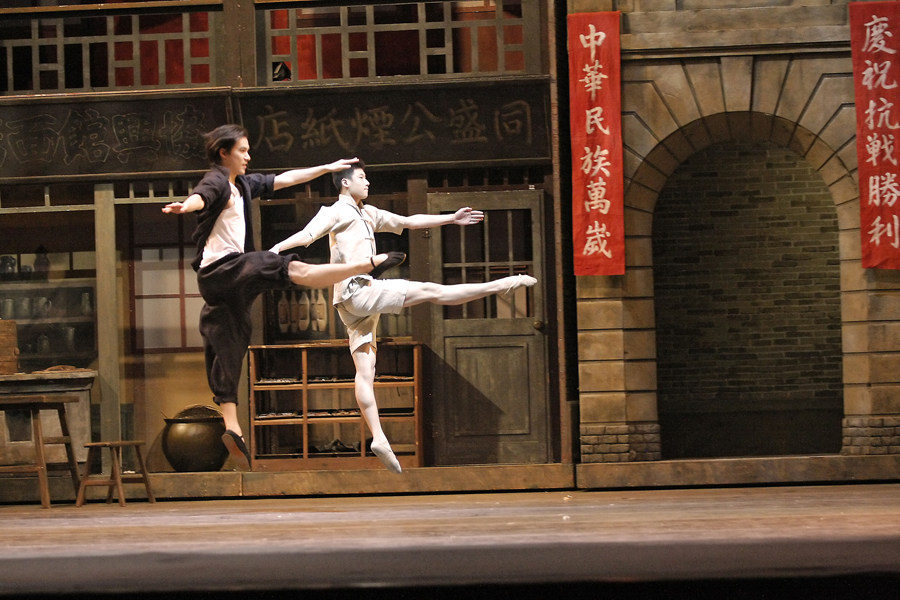
"In the Mood for Love" by Shanghai Ballet, 2010

With a history of thirty year, the Shanghai Ballet created and staged ballet Jane Eyre (Patrick de Bana), The Butterfly Lovers (Xin Lili), A Sigh of Love (Bertrand d’At), The Last Mission of Marco Polo (Jose Martinez), Shanghai Grand Theatre’s version The Nutcracker (Derek Deane).

Besides, the repertoire of the company includes Swan Lake (Derek Deane), Romeo and Juliet (Derek Deane), Coppelia (Pierre Lacotte), La Sylphide (Jean-Paul Gravier), The Nutcracker (Tetsutaro Shimizu), Giselle, Don Quixote, Balanchine and Beyond, The Ode of Joy—Gala Performance.

== Dancers ==
Zhenrong Chen (陳真榮) is a principal dancer for the Shanghai Ballet Company since he was 12. He was awarded with the Bronze Medal in the 1st National Ballet Competition of China in 1985 and the prize for Encourage in Shanghai Dance Competition in 1991. He danced leading roles in Swan Lake, Giselle, Romeo and Juliet, the Nutcracker, the White-haired Girl, The Butterfly Lovers, Coppelia, La Sylphide, Sleeping Beauty, The Latest Time, etc. He has also appeared in a Shanghai TV dancing show.

Since its founding, many young dancers of the company have won total of 37 medals in various international dance competitions. The Shanghai Ballet is active in cooperation and cultural exchange with the artists and companies both abroad and at home. The company not only tours nationwide but also has visited many countries and regions, including the US, UK, Canada, France, Spain, Norway, Australia, New Zealand, Japan, Korea, Indonesia, Singapore, Thailand, Finland, Hong Kong, Macao and Taiwan.
