= Michael Nunn (dancer) =

British ballet dancer and choreographer

Michael Nunn OBE (born 1967) is a British ballet dancer, choreographer, and a television and film director/producer.

== Early life ==
Michael Nunn was born in London in 1967, the son of a builder.

== Career ==
=== Dancer ===
Nunn joined the Royal Ballet in 1987, and was promoted to first soloist in 1997. His first big break was when Kenneth MacMillan chose him to dance the male lead, Crown Prince Rudolf, in Mayerling, a role originally created on David Wall.

In 2001, together with principal dancer William Trevitt, he left to found the modern dance groups, BalletBoyz and George Piper Dances.

=== Choreographer ===
Nunn now works as a choreographer with BalletBoyz and George Piper Dances.

=== Producer ===
A 90-minute abridgment of Kenneth Macmillan's ballet Romeo and Juliet was produced by Nunn and William Trevitt for BBC television and broadcast in 2020 on PBS.

== Personal life ==
He is married, and lives in Kew Gardens, London. He was appointed an Officer of the Order of the British Empire (OBE) in the 2012 Birthday Honours for services to Dance.

Nunn is an ambassador for Borne, a medical research charity looking into the causes of premature birth. In March 2019, Nunn hosted Borne to Dance with Darcey Bussell at the Royal Opera House to raise money for premature birth research.
