= A Midsummer Night's Dream (ballet) =

1962 ballet by George Balanchine

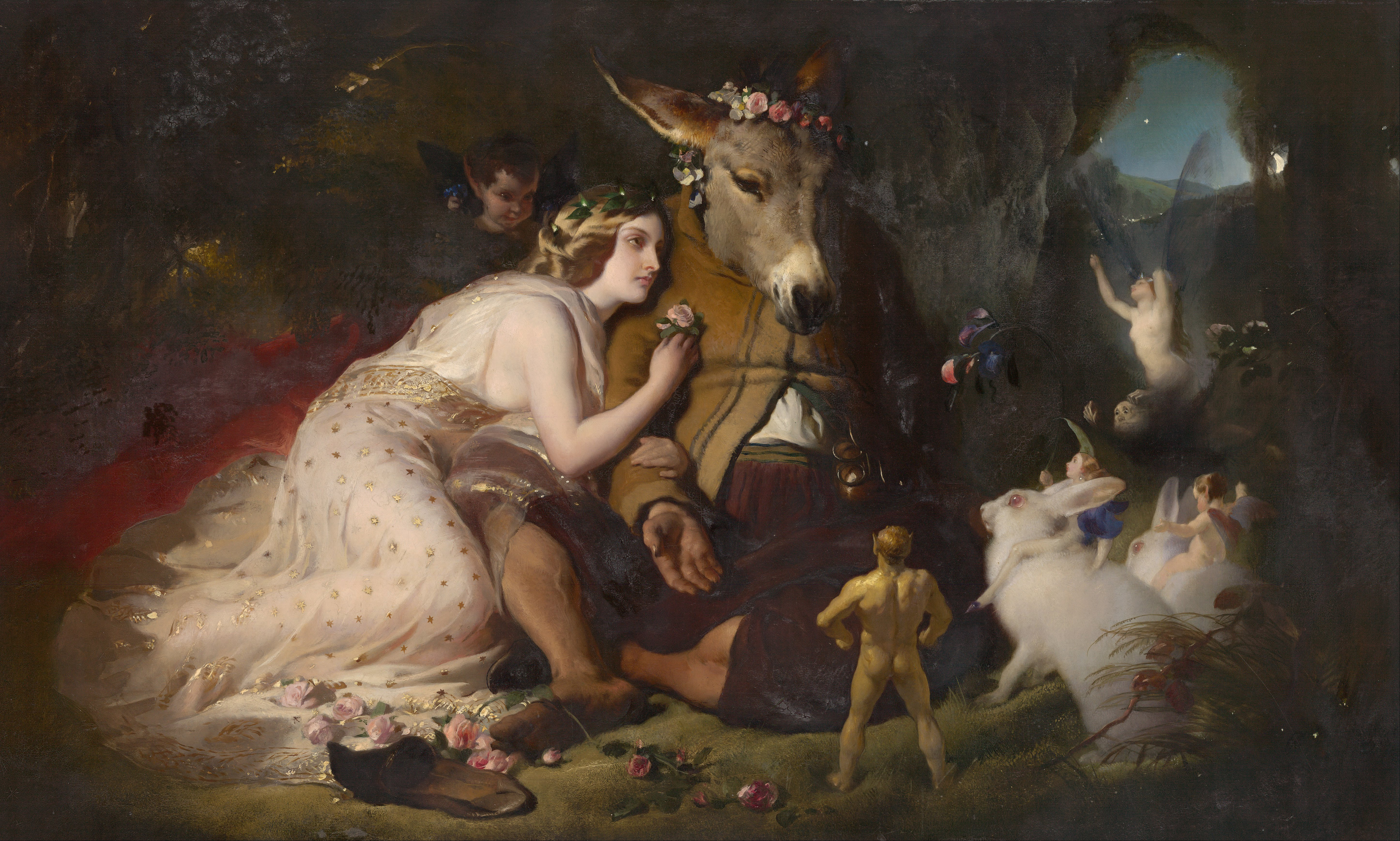
Edwin Landseer, Scene from A Midsummer Night's Dream, Titania and Bottom, 1851

A Midsummer Night's Dream is a two-act ballet choreographed by George Balanchine to Felix Mendelssohn's music to Shakespeare's play of the same name.

== History ==
A Midsummer Night's Dream, Balanchine's first completely original full-length ballet, premiered at New York City Ballet on 17 January 1962, with Edward Villella in the role of Oberon, Melissa Hayden in the role of Titania, and Arthur Mitchell in the role of Puck. They were joined by Francisco Moncion in the role of Theseus- Duke of Athens.

== Description ==
In addition to the incidental music, Balanchine incorporated other Mendelssohn works into the ballet, including the Overtures to Athalie, Son and Stranger, and The Fair Melusine, the "String Symphony No. 9 in C minor" and The First Walpurgis Night.

The ballet employs a large children's corps de ballet. Act I tells Shakespeare's familiar story of lovers and fairies while Act II presents a strictly classical dance wedding celebration. The ballet dispenses with Shakespeare's play-within-a-play finale. A Midsummer Night's Dream opened The New York City Ballet's first season at the New York State Theater in April, 1964.

== Videography ==
A 1966 performance was filmed and released the following year. It featured Suzanne Farrell, Edward Villella, Arthur Mitchell and Gloria Govrin.

A performance in 1986 was filmed as a part of Live from Lincoln Center. The Lincoln Center released the video online in light of the impact of the 2019–20 coronavirus pandemic on the performing arts.

In 1999, a Pacific Northwest Ballet performance at the Sadler's Wells Theatre in London was filmed and released as a DVD.

The Paris Opera Ballet also released a recording of a performance during the 2019-20 coronavirus pandemic, which featured Eleonora Abbagnato, Laëtitia Pujol, Alice Renavand, Stéphane Bullion, Hugo Marchand and Karl Paquette.

When the coronavirus pandemic cut short the San Francisco Ballet 2020 performance to just its opening night on March 6, it was subsequently recorded in an empty War Memorial Opera House shortly after its opening and released as part of the all-digital 2021 season.

== Casts ==
Roles	World premiere (1962)	1966 filmed version	1986 filmed version	Paris Opera Ballet premiere (2017)
Titania	Melissa Hayden	Suzanne Farrell	Maria Calegari	Eleonora Abbagnato
Oberon	Edward Villella	Edward Villella	Ib Andersen	Paul Marque
Puck	Arthur Mitchell	Arthur Mitchell	Jean-Pierre Frohlich	Hugo Vigliotti
Hippolyta	Gloria Govrin	Gloria Govrin	Victoria Hall	Alice Renavand
Theseus - Duke of Athens	Francisco Moncion		Cornel Crabtree	Florian Magnenet
Titania's cavalier	Conrad Ludlow		Jock Soto	Stéphane Bullion
Helena	Jillana		Stephanie Saland	Fanny Gorse
Demetrius	Bill Carter		Peter Frame	Audric Bezard
Hermia	Patricia McBride		Judith Fugate	Laëtitia Pujol
Lysander - Beloved of Hermia	Nicholas Magallanes		Kypling Houston	Alessio Carbone
Butterfly	Suki Schorer		Katrina Killian	Muriel Zusperreguy
divertissement	Violette Verdy; Conrad Ludlow		Merrill Ashley; Adam Lüders	Sae Eun Park; Karl Paquette

== Other versions ==
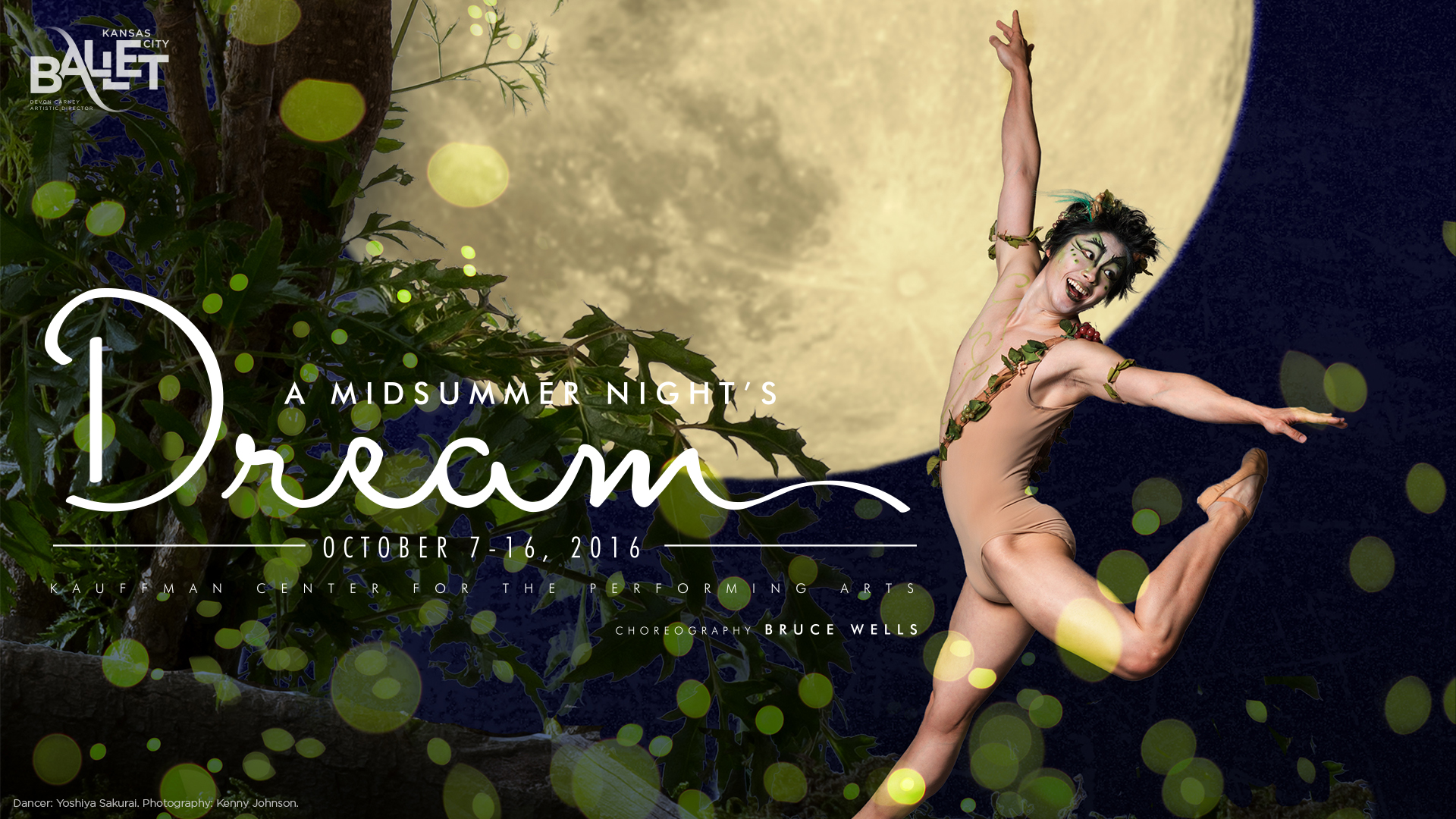
A Midsummer Night's Dream - Bruce Wells

- Frederick Ashton (The Dream)
- Christopher Wheeldon
- Bruce Wells on the Boston Ballet
- Ib Andersen on Ballet Arizona
- David Nixon on BalletMet Columbus
- John Neumeier on the Hamburg Ballet
- François Klaus on the Queensland Ballet
- Heinz Spoerli on Basel Ballet, Rhine Opera Ballet, and Zurich Ballet
- Lourdes Lopez on Miami City Ballet
- John Clifford on (The Portland Ballet)
- Liam Scarlett on The Royal New Zealand Ballet
