= Sonia Arova =

Bulgarian ballerina (1927–2001)

- Соня Арова
- Born: 20 June 1927; Sofia, Kingdom of Bulgaria
- Died: 4 February 2001 (aged 73)
- Occupation: Ballerina

Sonia Arova (born Sophie Errio; Bulgarian: Соня Арова; 20 June 1927 – 4 February 2001), was a Bulgarian ballerina.

== Biography ==
=== Early life ===
Sonia Arova was born as Sophie Errio on 20 June 1927 in Sofia, Kingdom of Bulgaria. She went to a ballet school, where she showed potential that the teachers she had advised her mother to take her to further her training. She began her training in Paris with Olga Preobrajenska. On holiday in Brittany in June 1940 with her best friend, June Ratcliffe, the young girls, Sophie, June and her sister Cecilia, were taken by train to Dax to escape the approaching Germans, by June's mother Andrée Ratcliffe. They eventually caught a ship to Plymouth from Bayonne; reputedly the last ship to leave, after Andrée Ratcliffe, with three children on her passport (her son was at school in England) refused to leave Sophie, as she was then called, alone on the dockside. She never saw her father again. She was reunited with her mother and sister eight years later. In England, the Ratcliffe family paid for her education at the Arts Educational Trust and she eventually joined the International Ballet in 1942.

=== Career ===
She worked as a ballerina in the Col. W. de Basil's Ballets Russes, the London Festival Ballet, the Royal Ballet, the National Ballet of Washington, D.C., and the American Ballet Theatre. She danced with Rudolph Nureyev in their American debut with Ruth Page's Chicago Opera Ballet troupe in New York City (1962). She was a great success, with kings and queens presenting her presents in appreciation of her work. She became Artistic Director of the National Ballet of Norway in 1966 and remained in the position until 1970.

In 1971, she co-directed the San Diego Ballet with her husband Thor Sutowski. The couple accepted teaching posts at the Alabama School of Fine Arts in 1976. During their stay, she was artistic director of the Alabama Ballet. In 1996, the pair returned to San Diego, California, where her daughter, Ariane, lived. In a ceremony at the United Nations, she was made a Dame by King Olaf V of Norway, becoming the second woman so distinguished.

=== Death ===
She died from pancreatic cancer on 4 February 2001, aged seventy-three.
