= Ihsan Rustem =

British choreographer

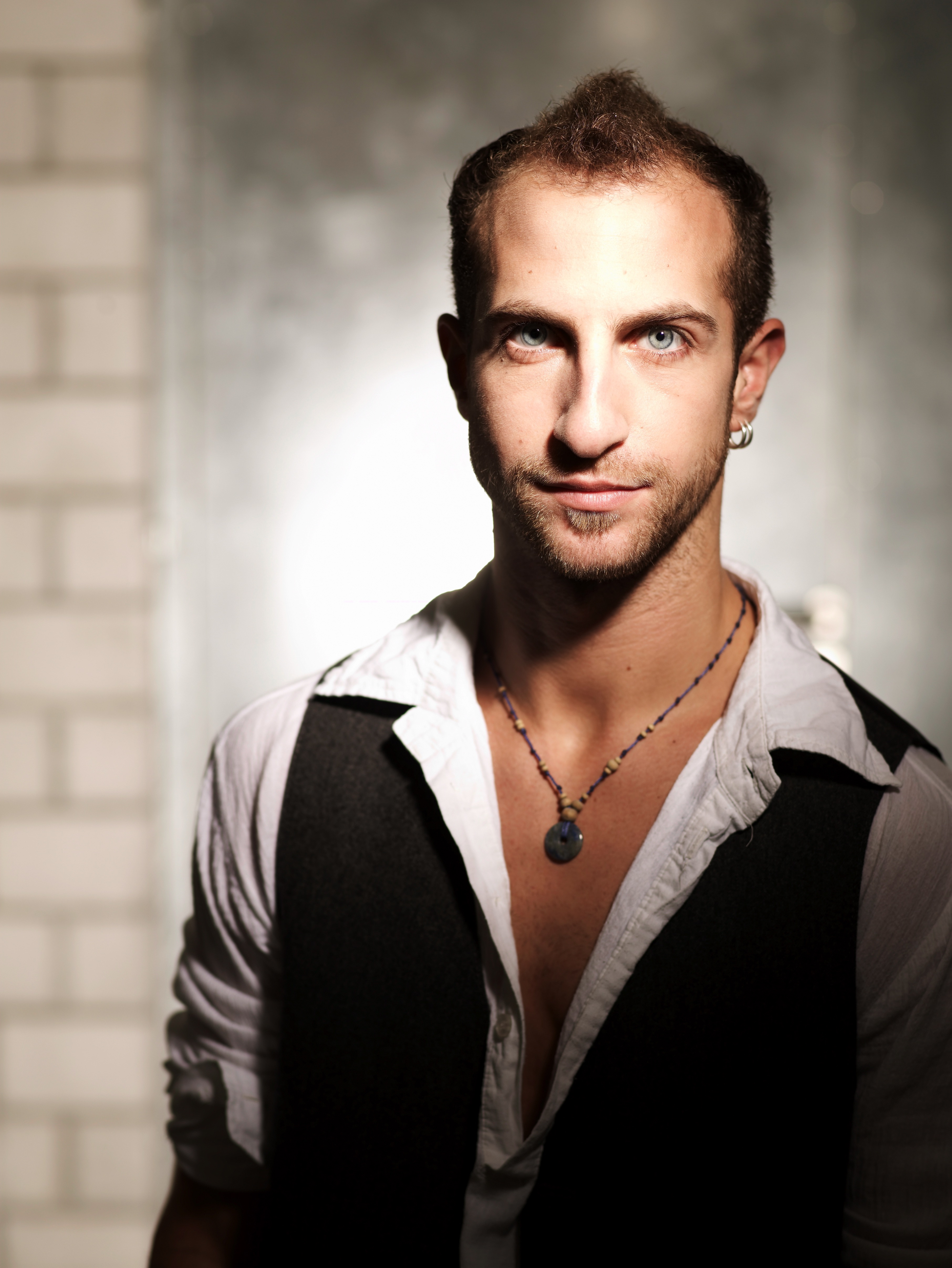
- Born: London, England, UK
- Occupation: Choreographer
- Website: ihsanrustem.com

Ihsan Rustem is a British choreographer living in Switzerland

== Early career ==
Since 2007 Rustem has lived and worked in Switzerland, initially as a soloist with Cathy Marston's Stadttheater Bern Ballet, then at the Tanz Luzerner Theater.

== Choreographer ==
Rustem was encouraged to choreograph whilst at the Rambert School, creating 10 pieces for the academy. His work 'Twist of Fate', made for the Bern Ballet's 'Dance: Made in Bern' series, was nominated for the 24th International Choreographic Competition Hannover in Hanover, Germany, and for the 2010 Sadler's Wells Global Dance Competition, becoming a finalist in the competitions. The following year he went on to win both the Sadler's Wells Theatre's Global Dance Contest and the Audience Choice Award ('Publikumspreis') at the 25th International Competition for Choreographers in Hannover

He was the 2014 recipient of Hubbard Street Dance Chicago's International Commissioning Project and in 2017 Ihsan's production of Carmen, created for the NW Dance Project, won Dance Magazine's 2017 Readers' Choice Award for Best Collaboration.

Rustem is the Resident Choreographer for the Northwest Dance Project.

He is the former Artistic Director of the Dance Art Studio Ballettschule Luzern and currently serves as their Artistic Advisor.

== Awards ==
- Sadler's Wells Theatre's Global Dance Contest 2011 Winner
