= Miami City Ballet =

Non-profit organization in the USA

General information
- Name: Miami City Ballet
- Year founded: 1986; 39 years ago
- Founder: Toby Lerner Ansin
- Founding artistic director: Edward Villella
- Principal venue: Ophelia & Juan Js. Roca Center; 2200 Liberty Avenue, Miami Beach, FL 33139
- Website: www.miamicityballet.org

Artistic staff
- Artistic Director: Gonzalo Garcia
- Ballet Masters: Roma Sosenko (Principal), Joan Latham, Arnold Quintane
- Principal Conductor: Gary Sheldon

Other
- Official school: Miami City Ballet School

Miami City Ballet is an American ballet company based in Miami Beach, Florida, led by artistic director Gonzalo Garcia.

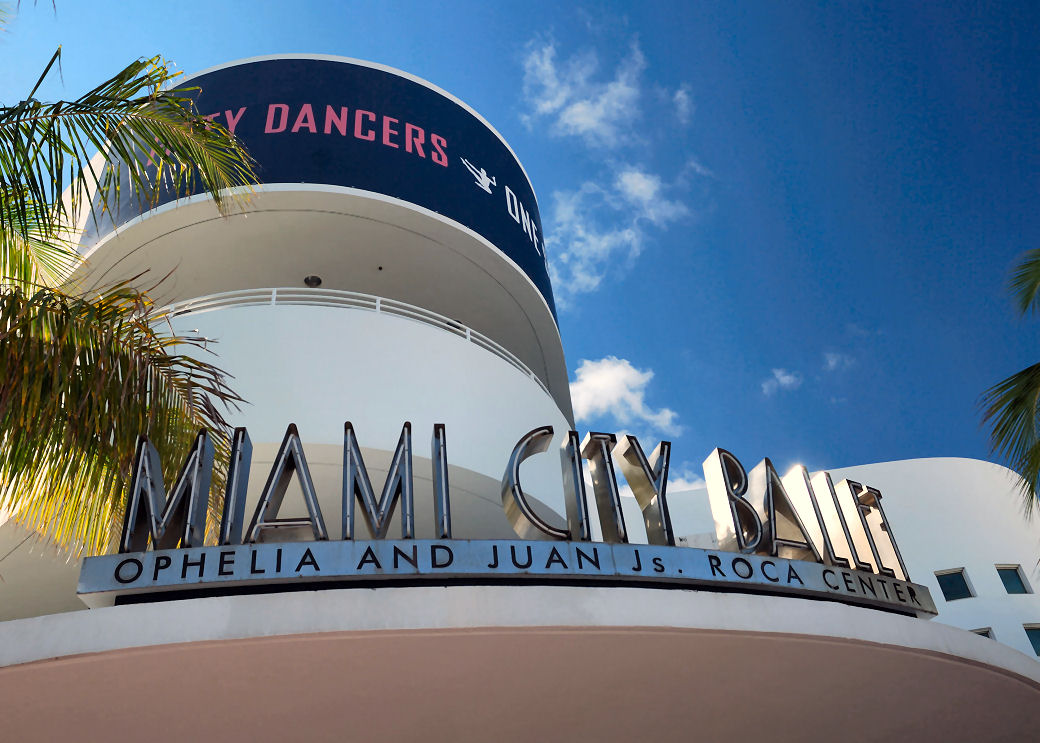
Exterior view of the Miami City Ballet studios (2008)

MCB was founded in 1985 by Toby Lerner Ansin, a Miami philanthropist. Ansin and the founding board hired Edward Villella, former New York City Ballet principal dancer to be the founding artistic director.

A bulk of the company's repertoire is made up of the work of George Balanchine, though the company also performs works by Jerome Robbins, Martha Graham, José Limón, Twyla Tharp, Trey McIntyre, Mark Morris, Jimmy Gamonet, who was the company's founding Resident Choreographer and Ballet Master from 1986 to 1999, Christopher Wheeldon, Justin Peck, and others, in addition to traditional full-length works including Giselle, Don Quixote, and Swan Lake.

In 2012, Lourdes Lopez was chosen to replace founding artistic director Edward Villella. Much like Villella, Lopez was a soloist and principal dancer at NYCB. Lopez is greatly influenced by George Balanchine and Jerome Robbins. Gonzalo Garcia was named the artistic director in 2025 after Lopez announced that the 2024-25 season would be her last with the company.

Miami City Ballet features an international ensemble of over 50 dancers. The company has an active repertoire of 88 ballets, including 9 world premiers, and performs over 75 times annually. Miami City Ballet serves as the resident ballet company in theaters in the Fort Lauderdale, Miami, and West Palm Beach areas. In addition, the company regularly tours both domestically and internationally. Its North American appearances include the Kennedy Center, the 1996 Olympic Arts Festival, Jacob's Pillow Dance Festival, the Los Angeles Music Center, Spoleto Festival USA, Harris Theater (Chicago), the New York City Center, and the Lincoln Center; while theaters and festivals in Europe, Central America, and South America have hosted the company.

Along with the ballet company, Miami City Ballet hosts a ballet school for students aging between 3 and 18. The school is split into three divisions: Children's division (ages 3 to 7), Student division (ages 8 to 13), and Pre-Professional division (ages 14 to 18). Students must audition to be placed in a division. Like the company, the school focuses on the Balanchine method (or Balanchine technique). MCB school students have the opportunity to perform in the yearly Nutcracker performance that the Miami City Ballet company puts together, and there are a number of intensive summer programs that students are eligible to attend.

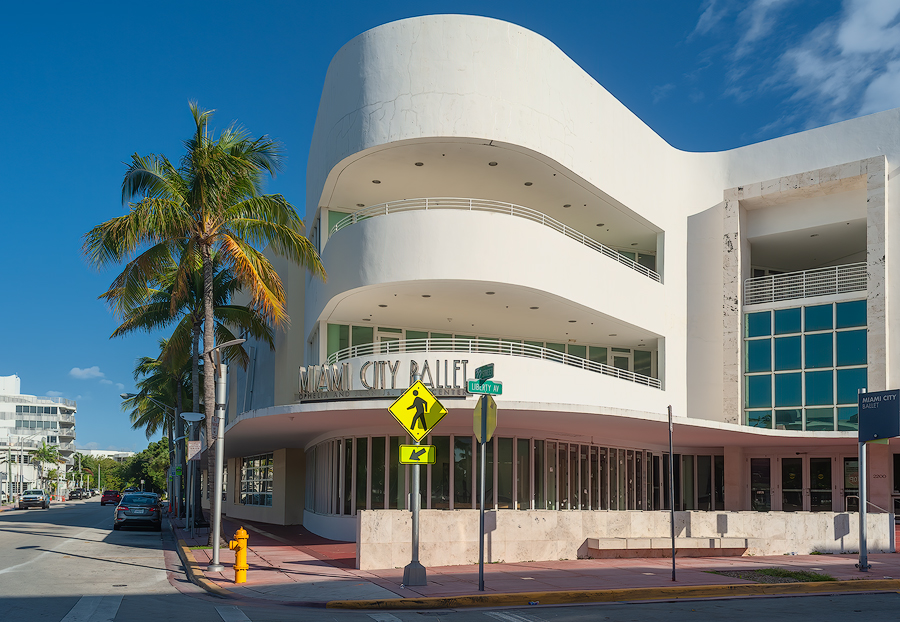
Miami City Ballet (2019) – Miami Beach

== Dancers ==
As of February 2024, the Miami City Ballet Dancers are:

=== Principals ===
Name	Nationality	Training	Joined MCB	Promoted to Principal	Other Companies
Nathalia Arja	Brazil	Escola de Dance Alica Arja; Miami City Ballet School	2011	2020	Compania de Ballet do Rio de Janeiro
Dawn Atkins	United States	The School of Richmond Ballet; Boston Ballet School	2021	2022	Boston Ballet
Katia Carranza	Mexico	Escuela Superior de Musica de Danza de Monterrey	1998, 2017	2004, 2017	Ballet de Monterrey
Renan Cerdeiro	Brazil	Escola de Danca Alice Arja; Miami City Ballet School	2010	2013	
Hannah Fischer	United States	Canada's National Ballet School	2020	2023	The National Ballet of Canada
Samantha Hope Galler	United States	The Ballet Academy, Inc. Boston Ballet School; Central Pennsylvania Youth Ballet; Boston Conservatory	2014	2022	Alabama Ballet
Ashley Knox	United States	Ann Parsley's School of Dance; The Rochester School of Dance; School of American Ballet; Miami City Ballet School	2003	2021	
Steven Loch	United States	Ballet Conservatory (Texas); Harid Conservatory; Pacific Northwest Ballet School	2021	N/A, Joined as Principal	Pacific Northwest Ballet
Yulia Moskalenko	Ukraine	Kyiv State Ballet College	2022	N/A, joined as Principal	National Opera of Ukraine
Stanislav Olshanskyi	Ukraine	Kyiv State Choreographic School	2022	N/A, Joined as Principal	National Opera of Ukraine
Alexander Peters	United States	Allegheny Ballet Academy; School of American Ballet; Royal Danish Ballet	2017	2019	Kansas City Ballet; Pennsylvania Ballet
Chase Swatosh	United States	Retter's Academy of Dance; Joffrey Ballet School; School of American Ballet	2010	2023	

=== Soloists ===
Name	Nationality	Training	Joined MCB	Promoted to Soloist	Soloist Rank
Jordan-Elizabeth Long	United States	Southwest Virginia Ballet	2014	N/A, Joined as Soloist	Principal Soloist
Taylor Naturkas	United States	Crooked Tree Arts Center School of Ballet; Miami City Ballet School	2020	2022	Principal Soloist
Damian Zamorano	Cuba	Provincial School of Ballet "Alejo Carpentier"; Escuela Nacional De Danza Clasica y Contemporanea; Miami City Ballet School	2013	2021	Principal Soloist
Adrienne Carter	United States	Impact Dance of Atlanta; Miami City Ballet School	2010	2022	Soloist
Cameron Catazaro	United States	School of Canton Ballet; Ballet Academy East; Miami City Ballet School	2019	2023	Soloist
Satoki Habuchi	Japan	Naomi Funatsuki Ballet Studio; Tazuru Ichiyanagi Ballet School; Miami City Ballet School	2017	2024	Soloist
Brooks Landegger	United States	School of American Ballet	2022	2024	Soloist
Ariel Rose	United States	Ballet Academy East; Jacqueline Kennedy Onassis School	2013	2022	Soloist
Nicole Stalker	United States	Cheryl Lee Studio of Dance; The Chautauqua Institute; The Rock School for Dance Education	2008	2023	Soloist

=== Corps de ballet ===
- SarahAnne Perel

=== Former dancers ===
- Patricia Delgado
- Jovani Furlan
- Jennifer Lauren
- Kathryn Morgan
- Daniel Sarabia
- Rolando Sarabia
