= Lourdes Lopez =

Cuban ballet dancer

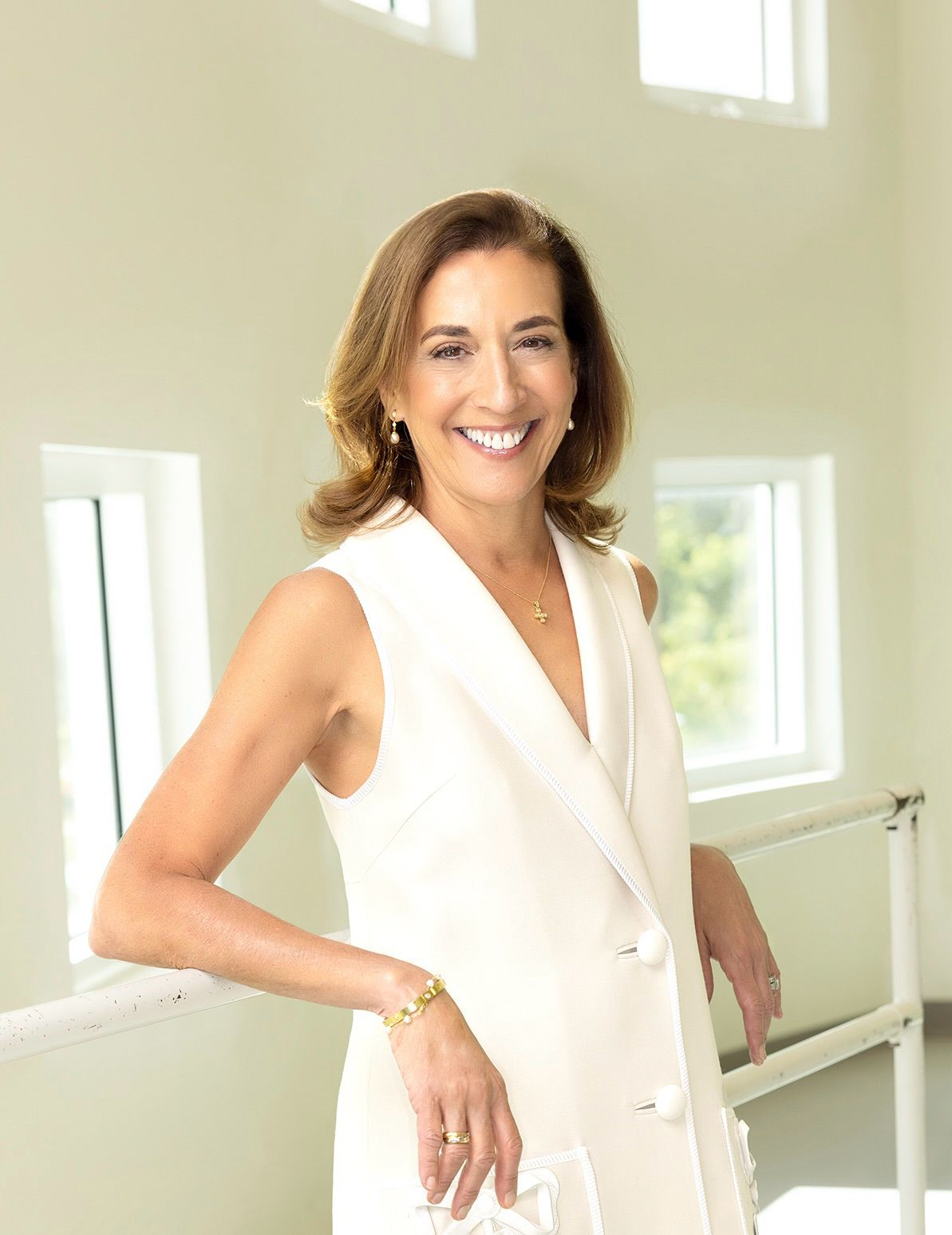
- Born: Havana, Cuba
- Occupation: Arts Executive
- Website: lourdeslopezarts.com

Lourdes Lopez (born 1958) is a Cuban-American arts executive.

She was a principal dancer with New York City Ballet and led Miami City Ballet from September 2012 through May 2025. In 2014, Lopez joined the Board of Trustees of the Ford Foundation. Lopez was named one of "The Most Influential People in Dance Today" and has been recognized with, among many others, the Dance Magazine Award and the Jerome Robbins Award.

== Early life ==
Lourdes Lopez was born in 1958 in Havana, Cuba and has two sisters, after 1959 the family moved to Miami, Florida where she was raised.

== Leadership and philanthropy ==
=== Lourdes Lopez Arts LLC ===
In 2025, Lourdes Lopez Arts LLC was founded. Lopez is working to promote the Miami cultural scene and was quoted in February 2015 with the following, “If you look into the future, what do you create that really protects, that cushions, the arts here in Miami? That’s what I’m trying to figure out.”

Lopez is a member of The Kennedy Center Honors Artist Committee and has also served as a dance panelist for the National Endowment for the Arts. She recently directed and co-produced The Art of Partnering™, a groundbreaking video series that explores this often-forgotten element of ballet.

=== Ford Foundation ===
Lourdes Lopez was appointed to the Ford Foundation Board of Trustees, making her the first artist in the foundation's history to serve on this board. This appointment was groundbreaking as it represented the foundation's recognition of arts leadership at the highest philanthropic levels. Upon her appointment, Ford Foundation President Darren Walker stated, "Lourdes brings a dynamism and creative energy that will enrich and advance the work of the foundation. She shares a deep commitment to social justice and has continually broken barriers in her own life while working to expand opportunity for everyone."

Lopez currently serves on her second six-year term and sits on the foundation's Nominating and Governance Committee and Justice & Equality Program Committee 2. The Ford Foundation has assets of more than $11 billion and operates in all 50 states and more than 50 countries. Significantly, Lopez noted that "The Ford Foundation's efforts to strengthen arts in America directly impacted my life and allowed me to fulfill my dream of a lifetime in the arts" through her scholarship to the School of American Ballet.

=== Miami City Ballet ===
Miami City Ballet is the largest South Florida performing arts organization, reaching an annual audience of over 125,000. Following a five-month search, in September 2012, an 11-member committee chose Lopez, among 35 candidates considered, to be the artistic director of the Miami City Ballet. Lopez says "Dance is so much, especially where I came from, about women. We're the thing in the front. Yet in terms of heading organizations, women haven't had a very visible position within a dance company. I don't know why that is. But I don't wake up in the morning and think I'm the only woman. I wake up in the morning and think, what am I going to do for Miami City Ballet next year?"

In 2016, Lopez brought Miami City Ballet to Lincoln Center's David H. Koch Theater. Alastair Macaulay praised Miami City Ballet for being "at the forefront of all those dancing choreography by George Balanchine today".

As artistic director, Lopez brought 47 premieres to Miami City Ballet including Alexei Ratmansky's Swan Lake. Lopez explained the production with the following, "Just imagine what it means for a company the size of MCB to have permission for a production like that, a creation by one of the greatest living choreographers in the world... I think ‘Swan Lake’ establishes a company as a worthy organization, It gives it a mark of quality. And that’s what I wanted for Miami City Ballet... that mark that said, ‘We are a real ballet company.’ And we achieved that.”

Lopez is the only individual entrusted by The George Balanchine Trust to completely reimagine A Midsummer Night's Dream. This represents an extraordinary level of trust from the organization that controls the choreographic legacy of George Balanchine. Additionally, Lopez reimagined Square Dance, The Nutcracker, and Firebird, all of which had elements inspired by South Florida.

She also led the company through the pandemic and ensured that the holiday staple “The Nutcracker” wouldn’t miss its annual performance developing an outdoor COVID-19 safe “George Balanchine’s Nutcracker in the Park” in downtown Doral in 2020. Miami City Ballet was viewed as a leader in returning the performing arts due to the resiliency of Lopez.

According to the critic Paul du Quenoy, her tenure "deserves all the credit in the world for raising the international profile of the company."

=== Morphoses ===
In 2007, Lopez co-founded Morphoses/The Wheeldon Company serving as its executive director. Morphoses aimed to revitalize dance through innovative collaborations with important artists from the worlds of music, visual arts, design, film and fashion; and by inviting younger and broader audiences to engage in and actively experience dance.

=== Cuban Artists Fund ===
Lopez co-founded The Cuban Artists Fund. It supports Cuban and Cuban-Americans achieve their artistic goals, while ensuring their economic freedom. Lopez was honored by the American Immigration Law Foundation for her accomplishments and contributions to American society.

=== George Balanchine Foundation ===
In 2002, Lopez became the executive director of The George Balanchine Foundation. She oversaw the Balanchine Centennial and worked to educate the public about dance to further the art of ballet.

=== After the New York City Ballet ===
Upon retirement in 1997, Lopez joined WNBC-TV in New York as a cultural arts reporter, writing and producing feature segments on the arts, artists and arts education. She was also a full-time senior faculty member and director of student placement, student evaluation and curriculum planning at New York's Ballet Academy East. She served on the dance faculty of Barnard College and guest taught at numerous dance institutions and festivals in the United States. She even appeared with Jock Soto in some Sesame Street segments such as demonstrating cooperation with Elmo and Zoe.

== Dance career ==
Lopez was handpicked by George Balanchine to join New York City Ballet in 1972. Mentored by Balanchine and Jerome Robbins, Lopez rose to principal dancer, performing iconic roles in works like Balanchine’s Stravinsky Violin Concerto, Firebird, Serenade, and Robbins’ Dances at a Gathering and Fancy Free. She additionally contributed by leading many family matinee series.

At the age of eleven, Lopez received a full scholarship to train at the School of American Ballet. At fourteen, she moved to New York permanently to devote herself to full-time studies at the School of American Ballet, and shortly after her sixteenth birthday, she joined the corps de ballet of New York City Ballet in 1974. She was promoted to soloist in 1981 and principal dancer in 1984 and retired at age 39 in 1997.

== Personal life ==
In 1987, Lopez married Lionel Saporta. She is now married to George Skouras. They live in Miami Beach and have two children, Adriel Saporta and Calliste Skouras.
