= Alabama Ballet =

American ballet company

The Alabama Ballet is a ballet company in Alabama, United States.

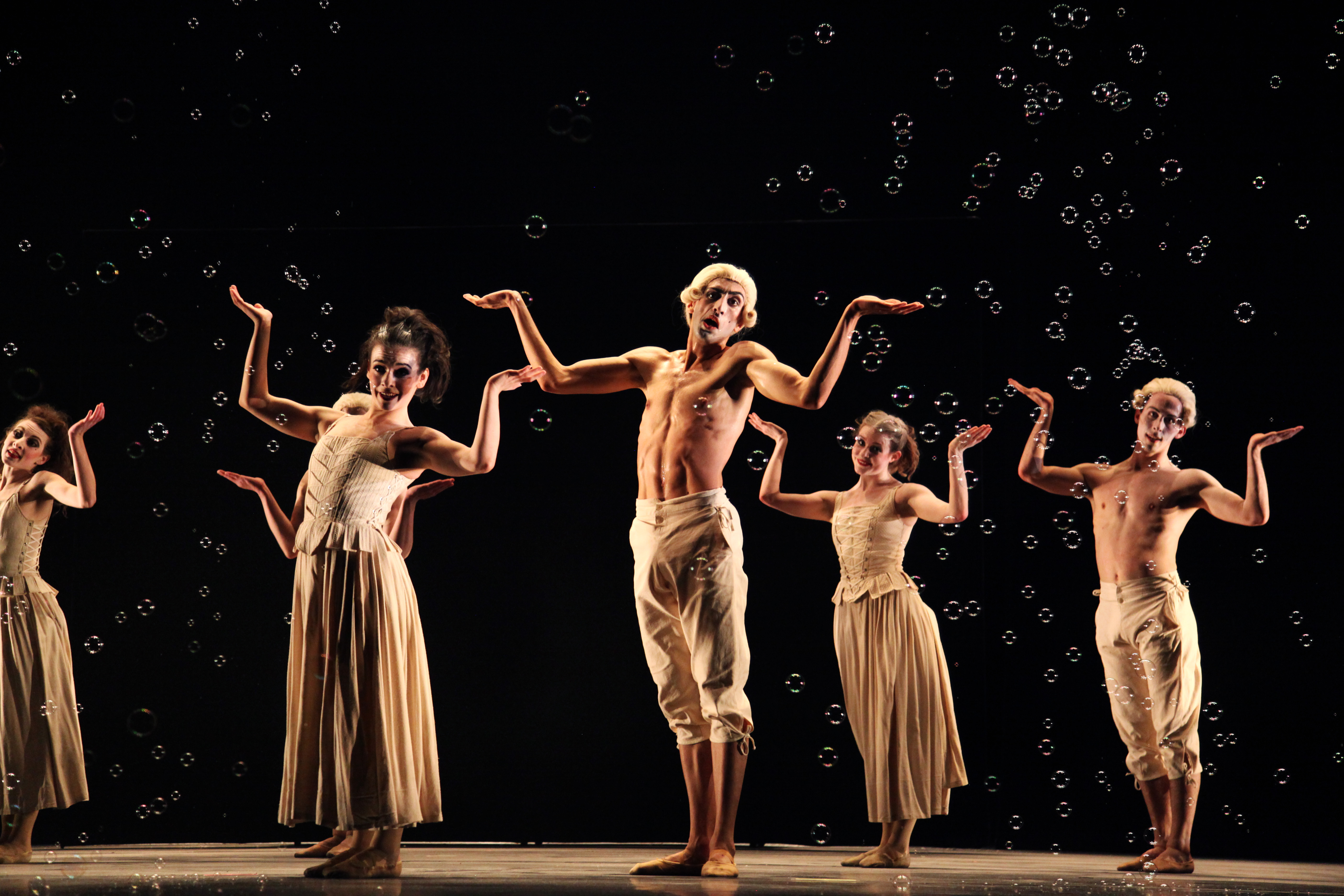
The Alabama Ballet- Six Dances - Jiří Kylián

== History ==
Prior to the establishment of Alabama Ballet, there were three smaller ballet companies in the state of Alabama: the Birmingham Civic Ballet, the University of Alabama at Birmingham Ballet and Ballet Alabama. In 1981, dancers Sonia Arova and Thor Sutowski decided to start a bona fide ballet company in the state and created Alabama Ballet. Fifteen years later, in 1996, Wes Chapman and Roger Van Fleteren became co-directors of the company. Nearly a decade later, in 2005, Tracey Alvey became Ballet Mistress and, two years later, Artistic Director. After Chapman left, Van Fleteren became Associate Artistic Director and Resident Choreographer. Moreover, Leslie Fillmer serves as a music composer for the company.

One of its annual performances is The Nutcracker as choreographed by George Balanchine (1904-1983). Indeed, it is one of only six ballet companies in the world licensed to perform it. The company has also performed choreographic renditions of Dracula and Dr Jekyll and Mr Hyde.

Since 1997, in conjunction with the Gorham Bluff's Institute, it has organized a summer residency in Gorham's Bluff, Alabama, overlooking the Tennessee River Valley.

Additionally, the company runs a school for children ages 3 to 18.
