= New Jersey Ballet =

American ballet company

- Industry: Education, Performance
- Founded: 1958
- Headquarters: Florham Park, New Jersey, U.S.
- Area served: New Jersey
- Website: www.njballet.org

The New Jersey Ballet is a ballet company based in Livingston, New Jersey in the United States, founded in 1958 by native New Jerseyan Carolyn Clark and her fellow dancer, George Tomal.

== History ==
Carolyn Clark's mother established New Jersey School of Ballet in Orange, New Jersey in 1953 with her mother's friends who were dancers. Clark has involved in her mother's dance school operation since its beginning. She has later become a professional dancer herself. After touring around the world with American Ballet Theatre and the Metropolitan Opera Ballet, she had conceived an idea to create a ballet company in New Jersey with national significance. The company was finally founded in 1958 with the first performance on December 27, 1958 at the Arts High School in Newark, New Jersey with George Tomal as the founding director.

After thirteen years from the first season that consisted of two performances for a few hundred people, New Jersey Ballet started a production of The Nutcracker in 1971 at Paper Mill Playhouse in Millburn, New Jersey with world-renowned dancer, Edward Villella, in the role of the Cavalier. The company has run Nutcracker production at Paper Mill Playhouse with Paper Mill Orchestra for many consecutive years since its debut. It also travels to bergenPAC in Englewood, New Jersey, Stafford Township Arts Center in Manahawkin, New Jersey and Middle Township PAC in Cape May Court House.

The company started gaining wider recognition when it started the tours to Taiwan, the Soviet Union, Bermuda and Italy during the 1990s. In 2004, the company staged full-length production of Esmeralda at New Jersey Performing Arts Center. It was the first company in the United States to perform full-length version of Esmeralda and it had gained national recognition. The company also visited India's newly opened National Centre for the Performing Arts in Mumbai in 2006 with its Nutcracker production. It was the first full-length classical ballet in India. In 2008, it traveled to Russia on a seven-city tour of mixed repertory that included Saturday Night, For Ella, Let's Go South and Belong.

Today, the annual season consists of many performances in many venues throughout New Jersey. It also includes New Jersey Ballet Matinee for Kids and Families, which is a collections of children's ballets of classic tales such as Cinderella, Sleeping Beauty, Tom Sawyer, Hansel & Gretel and more.

== New Jersey School of Ballet ==
At the present time, the school offers many courses and instructions ranging from age 4 to professional. The classes include Ballet, Academic Ballet, Pointe, Jazz and Tap. The school offers intensive program for Ballet, Variations, Partnering, Character, Jazz, and Special Workshops by audition only. The classes are held in three locations; Livingston, New Jersey; Somerville, New Jersey; and Morristown, New Jersey. Each year, more than one hundred students who pass auditions have a chance to perform in New Jersey Ballet's Nutcracker professional production. Advanced students are included in New Jersey Ballet Matinee for Kids and Families productions.

New Jersey Ballet's Junior Company is the school's pre-professional program for students with carrier track in dance. Students have opportunities to work with professional dancers, for example, being cast members when the Bolshoi performed at the Metropolitan Opera. Many alumni have performed with or are current dancers of American Ballet Theatre, New York City Ballet, San Francisco Ballet, The Joffrey, Alvin Ailey American Dance Theater, and other major companies.

== Artistic leadership ==
The artistic leadership of New Jersey Ballet, as of October 23 2024:

=== Artistic Director ===
- Maria Kowroski, Artistic Director from September 2022 (Acting Artistic Director 2021)

=== Other Faculty ===
- David Tamaki - Executive Director
- Kotoe Kojima-Noa - Artistic Coordinator

=== Former faculty ===
==== Former Artistic Directors ====
- Carolyn Clark - co-founder and Artistic Director from 1968-2021
- George Tomal - co-founder, Artistic Director (1958-1968), resident choreographer (Ballet) from 1968

==== Other former faculty ====
- Jay Norman - resident choreographer (Modern ballet and jazz) - early 1970s to mid-1980s
- Paul Hilliard McRae - Assistant Artistic Director (1989 to 2023)
- Edward Villella, former Artistic Advisor to NJ Ballet from 1972 to 2023
- Leonid Kozlov, former Artistic Advisor. from 1989
- Eleanor D'Antuono, former Artistic Advisor. from 1986

== Production Department ==
- N. James Whitehill III, Stage Technician

== Performers ==
New Jersey Ballet has a diverse company with artists from around the world including the United States, Argentina, Japan, Korea, Philippines, and Brazil to name a few.

=== Dancers ===
The dancers of the New Jersey Ballet according to the company website, as of October 2023.

- Emily Barrows
- Louis DeFelice
- Vinicius Freire
- Yuiko Honda
- Akira Iida
- Se Hyun Jin
- Ilse Kapteyn
- Raleigh Ledford
- David Lopena
- Jonatan Lujan
- Risa Mochizuki
- Denise Parungao
- Jonathan Philbert
- Abigail Robison
- Brian Sevilla
- Eunice Suba
- Felipe Valentini
- Joshuan Vazquez
- Catherine Whiting
- Alexandra Limeburgs (Apprentice)
- Lilli Etheredge (Apprentice)
