= William Trevitt (dancer) =

British ballet dancer and choreographer (born 1969)

William James Piper Trevitt OBE (born 1969) is a British ballet dancer and choreographer.

== Early life ==
William Trevitt was born in 1969 in Cambridge. He began dancing aged 6, and trained at the Royal Ballet School, from 11 to 16.

== Career ==
=== Dancer ===
Trevitt joined the Royal Ballet aged 18, and was promoted to principal in 1994. In 2001, together with fellow principal dancer Michael Nunn, he left to found the modern dance group, BalletBoyz.

=== Choreographer ===
Trevitt now works as a choreographer with BalletBoyz. A 90-minute abridgment of Kenneth Macmillan's ballet Romeo and Juliet was produced by Michael Nunn and William Trevitt for BBC television and broadcast in 2020 on PBS.

== Personal life ==
He lives with his wife Rebecca and their three sons in Kingston, Surrey. He was appointed an Officer of the Order of the British Empire (OBE) in the 2012 Birthday Honours for services to Dance.
