= Edward Villella =

American ballet dancer and choreographer (born 1936)

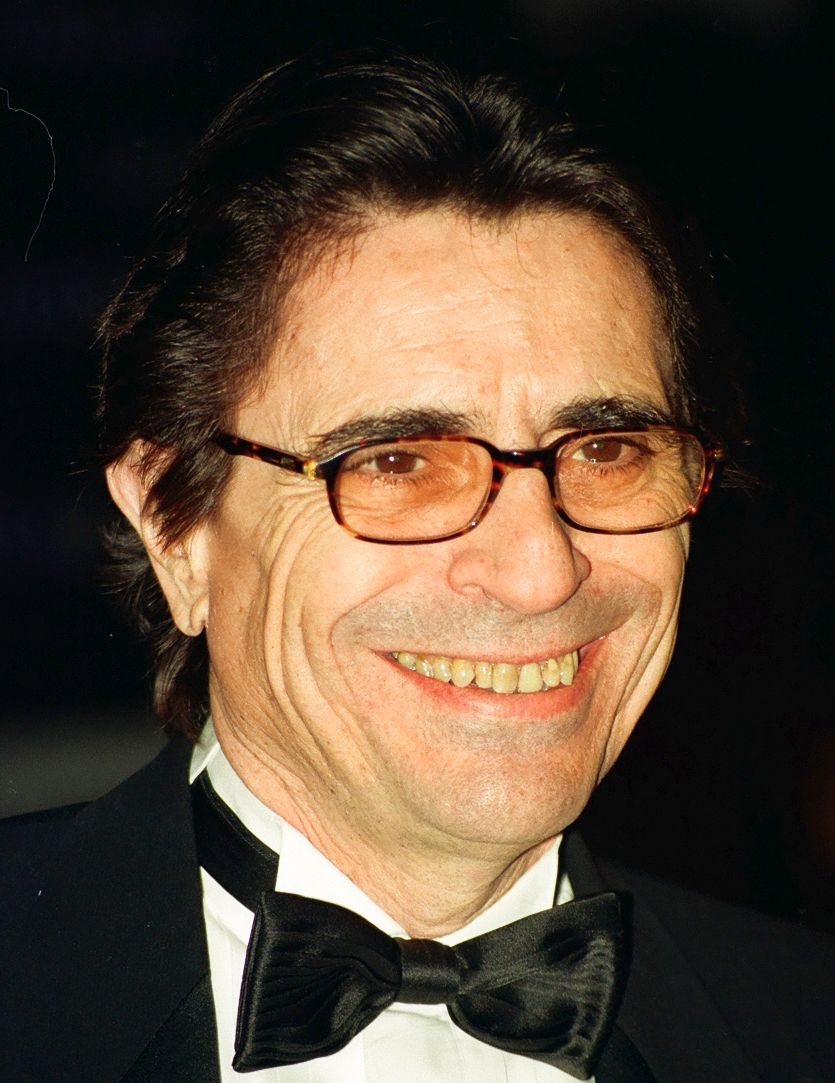
- Villella in 1997
- Born: October 1, 1936 (age 89); New York City, U.S.
- Occupations: Ballet dancer, Choreographer

Edward Villella (born October 1, 1936) is an American ballet dancer and choreographer. He is frequently cited as America's most celebrated male dancer of ballet at the time. He has won numerous awards, including the Daytime Emmy Award for Outstanding Children's Special, the Kennedy Center Honors, and the National Medal of Arts.

== Education ==
Villella enrolled in the School of American Ballet at age ten, and then the High School of Performing Arts, but then interrupted his dance studies to complete his college education. He attended the New York Maritime Academy, where he lettered in baseball and was a championship boxer. He graduated with a marine science degree in 1957, and rejoined the School of American Ballet.

== Career ==
Villella became a member of the New York City Ballet in 1957, rising to soloist in 1958 and principal dancer in 1960, last dancing there in 1979. Among his most noteworthy performances were Oberon in George Balanchine's ballet A Midsummer Night's Dream (with music by Felix Mendelssohn), Tarantella, Rubies in the Balanchine ballet Jewels, and Prodigal Son.

Villella was the first American male dancer to appear with the Royal Danish Ballet, and the only American ever asked to dance an encore at the Bolshoi Theatre in Moscow. He danced at the inaugural for President John F. Kennedy, and performed for Presidents Johnson, Nixon, and Ford. He won an Emmy Award in 1975 for his CBS television production of Balanchine's Harlequinade. He danced in two television versions of The Nutcracker (in different roles), in a ballet film version of A Midsummer Night's Dream, and in a 1966 TV production of Brigadoon, in which he played the tragic suitor Harry Beaton. During the 1960s he and his dancing partner Patricia McBride, who starred together in a 1965 television version of The Nutcracker, appeared often on The Ed Sullivan Show. In 1973, Villella appeared as himself in an episode of The Odd Couple titled "Last Tango in Newark" during which he said (much to Felix's dismay) that he always wanted to be a professional football player and that he took up ballet to meet girls; his son, Roddy, also appeared. In 1983, Villella guest-starred on the soap opera Guiding Light.

== Directorships ==
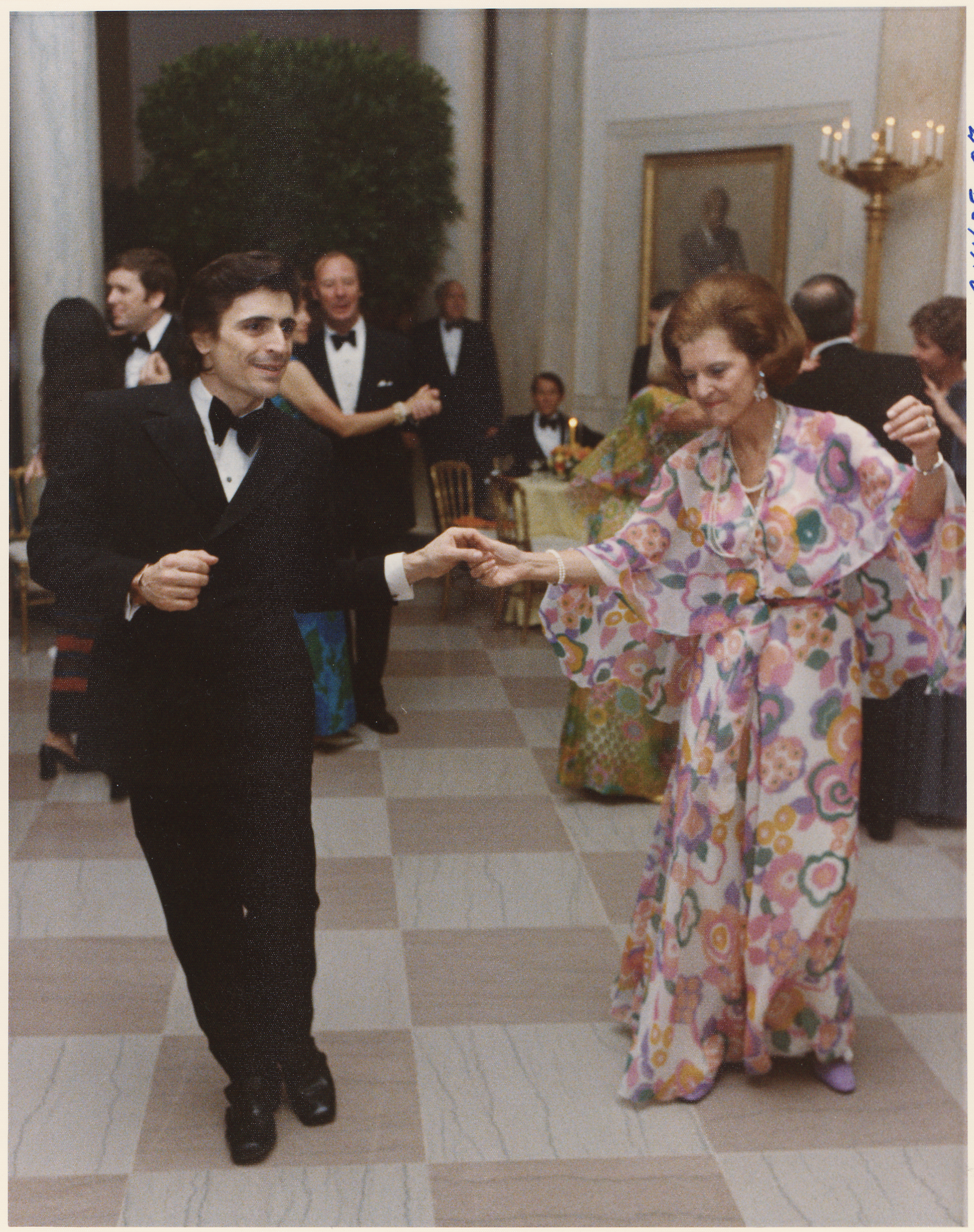
First Lady Betty Ford and Edward Villella dancing at the White House May 8, 1975 External videos: Edward Villella and Patricia McBride on USA DANCE: New York City Ballet (1965) performing George Balanchine's "Tarantella" on archive.org

After retirement as a performer, Villella was the artistic coordinator of the Eglevsky Ballet from 1979 to 1984 and the director of Ballet Oklahoma (now Oklahoma City Ballet) from 1983 to 1985. He has also been artistic advisor to New Jersey Ballet since 1972 and currently is a special artist at New Jersey School of Ballet. He was named founding artistic director of Miami City Ballet in 1985 and served in that role until 2012.

== Awards and honors ==
- American Academy of Achievement Golden Plate Award, 1971
- Daytime Emmy Award for Outstanding Children's Special for "Harlequinade" from The CBS Festival of Lively Arts for Young People, 1975
- Kennedy Center Honoree, 1997
- National Medal of Arts, 1997
- Named the Dorothy F. Schmidt artist-in-residence at Florida Atlantic University, 2000
- Florida Artists Hall of Fame, 2007
- National Museum of Dance's Mr. & Mrs. Cornelius Vanderbilt Whitney Hall of Fame, 2009

== Personal life ==
Villella and his wife Linda Carbonetto, a former Olympic figure skater, married in April 1981. They have two daughters named Lauren and Crista. Villella also has a son, Roddy, with his first wife, former New York City Ballet dancer Janet Greschler, to whom he was married from 1962 to November 1980.
