= BalletBoyz =

British all-male dance company

BalletBoyz or Ballet Boyz are a London-based all-male dance company.

BalletBoyz was founded in 1999 by Michael Nunn and William Trevitt, both principal dancers with The Royal Ballet. BalletBoyz was originally called George Piper Dances.

== Productions ==
Title	Year	Type
Deluxe	2020	Stage
Them/Us	2019	Stage
Fourteen Days	2017	Stage
Life.	2016	Stage
Young Men	2015	Stage
The Murmuring/Mesmerics	2014	Stage
Serpent/Fallen	2013	Stage
Torsion/Alpha/Void	2010	Stage
BalletBoyz: Greatest Hits	2008	Stage
Darcey Bussell - Farewell	2007	Stage
RFH Gala: Ballet for the People	2007	Stage
Encore	2007	Stage
Naked	2005	Stage
Rise and Fall	2004	Stage
Pointless	2001	Stage
