= Doug Fitch =

- Born: August 2, 1959 (age 66); Philadelphia, Pennsylvania, US
- Occupations: Opera director, designer, artist
- Years active: 1970–present
- Website: http://www.douglasfitch.com

Doug Fitch (born August 2, 1959) is a polymath American visual artist and director. He is most well known for his opera productions, but his body of work spans multiple media, from drawing and sculpture to theater, architecture, and food.

Fitch is the co-founder of the theatre and entertainment company Giants Are Small, together with Swiss producer and filmmaker Edouard Getaz, and multimedia entrepreneur Frederic Gumy. He is also the co-founder of the collaborative art partnership known as Orphicorps with Mimi Oka, known for using edible media in experimental feasts.

During his career as a director, Fitch has created productions for the Los Angeles Opera, the New York Philharmonic, the Los Angeles Philharmonic, the Santa Fe Opera, the Royal Stockholm Philharmonic Orchestra, and several other major arts institutions.

Fitch has collaborated with James Levine, Alan Gilbert, Leonard Slatkin, Peter Sellars, Robert Wilson, Karole Armitage, Joshua Bell, and other artists. He has also worked with puppeteer Jim Henson (The Muppets, Sesame Street), and the architect/designer Gaetano Pesce.

== Early years ==
Doug Fitch was born in Philadelphia, Pennsylvania. He then grew up in Fargo, North Dakota and Coventry, Connecticut. As a youth, he studied violin, dance and puppetry. Early on, he was involved with community theater and eventually, with his brother the artist Chris Fitch, turned the family basement into a theater to perform original works based on Shakespeare tragedies and musical comedies. Later, after attending an introduction to puppetry arts course at the University of Connecticut at age nine, he worked with his family to create a touring puppet theatre.

Fitch studied at Harvard University, where he graduated summa cum laude in Visual Studies. During those years, Fitch performed in various musical theater productions including the Hasty Pudding Theatricals. He also collaborated with director Peter Sellars on several theatrical enterprises, including a puppet version of Wagner's Ring cycle in the streets of Denver Colorado. For another Sellars project – a well-known production of Shakespeare's Antony and Cleopatra, staged in the Adams House Swimming Pool at Harvard, Fitch played the part of the Clown.

In 1979–1980 Fitch took a year off from Harvard to study cooking at La Varenne in Paris, and architectural design at l’Institut d’Architecture et d’Etudes Urbaines in Strasbourg, France. At the latter, he met Italian architect and designer Gaetano Pesce, who became an important influence on his work. Fitch worked with Pesce for the next three years in Venice, making models of visionary buildings and contributing to international design competitions.

== Interior design ==
In the late 1980s, Fitch emerged as an architectural designer. He designed several houses, interiors, and pieces of furniture.

In 1986, with collaborator Ross Miller, he designed the home of art dealer/collector Meredyth Moses. First published in the Boston Globe, it was revisited by Metropolis ten years later. Fitch continued to design private residences and in 1989, he also co-founded Ooloo, a company specializing in one-of-a-kind art furniture that he made with artisans in the Philippines. Ooloo furniture was featured in galleries in the US, Europe, and Japan. The company also produced products for the Museum of Modern Art, the Guggenheim, Barney's, Henry Bendell, and many other institutions.

His time in the Philippines led to an assignment by the government there to become the 1997 International Design Consultant for Gifts and Housewares exports. An article appeared about this work in Metropolis.

Meanwhile, Fitch continued to work in the theater, mainly as a set designer for the Seattle Repertory Theater. He also wrote, directed, and designed a series of experimental shows in the Boston area, including The Potluck Supper, The Sweating Fire Alarm, and The Sweating Door Alarm.

A chance meeting with Mimi Oka led to the creation of Orphicorps and a series of Orphic Feasts that eventually culminated in a French-English bilingual book called Orphic Fodder

Upon his return to the US Fitch moved to New York, where together with Oka, he created two major events with the Asia Society, the Edible Still Life in Clay and Good Taste in Art. Many other events followed in Japan, France, New York, Santa Fe, Portugal, and the Czech Republic.

In 1999, Alan Gilbert hired Fitch to design and construct the interior of his New York apartment. This led to an ongoing series of music-based projects with Gilbert.

Fitch also designed an innovative interior for violinist Joshua Bell's home. A New York Times article published in 2003 about Fitch's design caught the attention of Uli Bader, then the artistic director of the National Symphony Orchestra, who invited Fitch to create a series of concert theatre productions at the Kennedy Center in Washington DC: L'enfant et les sortilèges, Swan Lake, and The Abduction from the Seraglio.

Fitch's collaboration with agent Linde Trottenberg, founder of Multi Art International, led to several art exhibitions and installations all over in Germany. The first of these was entitled Organs of Emotion and was held in the Center for Epileptic Research in Bonn. The entire show of drawings was purchased by a pharmaceutical company and toured throughout Germany. Another exhibition, called Mit Haut und Haaren ("With Skin and Hair"), was commissioned and was still traveling around Germany as of March 2013.

== Theatre director and designer ==
Fitch's first collaboration with conductor Alan Gilbert was Igor Stravinsky's The Soldier's Tale at the Santa Fe Chamber Music Festival soon followed by Das Rheingold at the Royal Stockholm Philharmonic. In 2005, Fitch directed and designed the set for Turandot, at the Santa Fe Opera. In 2006, he directed, designed the costumes and sets and choreographed a new production of Hansel and Gretel for the Los Angeles Opera.

In the summer of 2006, Fitch directed and designed the sets for the American premiere of Elliott Carter's only opera, What Next?, conducted by James Levine, at Tanglewood. The show was filmed by Kitao Sakurai and shown at the Museum of Modern Art in New York.

== Giants Are Small ==
In 2005, Fitch was invited by violinist Pinchas Zukerman to create a production of The Soldier's Tale at Lincoln Center, New York, featuring principal players from the New York Philharmonic. Actor F. Murray Abraham was the narrator, Marian Seldes voiced the Devil, and Tim Blake Nelson played the soldier. This project would herald the beginning of Fitch's collaboration with Swiss producer and filmmaker Edouard Getaz. The show itself featured a miniature theater populated with hundreds of two-dimensional paper puppets and was all filmed live. What was captured on camera was simultaneously projected on a screen above the musicians.

The show was repeated at the National Arts Centre in Ottawa, Canada, leading to the development of live animation: a concept merging film and theater in a unique way by making a spectacle out of the making of the film on stage.

After two years of experimental development, Fitch, Getaz, and multimedia entrepreneur Frederic Gumy co-founded the theatre and entertainment company Giants Are Small.

In 2008, Giants Are Small created an adaptation of Peter and the Wolf, which combined live animation and live music played by the Los Angeles Philharmonic. A prequel extended the original story to an hour-long adventure, situated in contemporary Los Angeles, which was underscored by excerpts from a number of other symphonic works. ranging from Shostakovitch to Gershwin. The show was presented at the Walt Disney Concert Hall.

In 2010, Giants Are Small created a production of György Ligeti's absurdist opera Le Grand Macabre with the New York Philharmonic, directed by Doug Fitch (who also designed the set), conducted by Alan Gilbert and produced by Edouard Getaz. The production, which was sold out before it opened, was elected "Best Opera of the Year" by the New York Times, the New York Magazine, and TimeOut NY. The production featured a cast that included Eric Owens, Melissa Parks, Barbara Hannigan, Anthony Roth Costanzo, and Mark Schowalter. Costumes were designed by Catherine Zuber and the lighting was designed by Clifton Taylor. Giants Are Small's live animation was created from drawings and designs by Fitch. The show was presented at Avery Fisher Hall, Lincoln Center.

In 2011, Giants Are Small and the New York Philharmonic paired again to present a new production of Leoš Janáček's The Cunning Little Vixen, directed by Fitch (who also designed the costumes and co-designed the set with Skip Mercier), conducted by Gilbert, and produced by Getaz. The show was choreographed by Karole Armitage and featured a large cast, including Isabel Bayrakdarian, Alan Opie, Melissa Parks, and the Metropolitan Opera Children's Chorus. The production was designated "Best Classical Performance of the Year 2011" by New York Magazine. The show was presented at Avery Fisher Hall.

On February 22, 2012, Giants Are Small and the New York Philharmonic announced a new collaboration, A Dancer's Dream, featuring Igor Stravinsky's ballets Fairy's Kiss and Petrushka, conducted by Gilbert, directed and designed by Fitch, and video directed and produced by Getaz, in June 2013 at Avery Fisher Hall. The show was partially based on a version developed in 2008 at the University of Maryland, directed by Fitch in collaboration with conductor James Ross. Early in 2013, Giants Are Small announced that the show would also comprise one excerpt of Louis Durey's Neige. New York City Ballet's Sara Mearns was the star ballerina, representing various characters throughout the show, in a choreography by Armitage. The production features a mix of music, live filmmaking and puppetry, and ballet.
