= Giants Are Small =

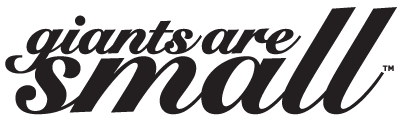
- Type: Private company
- Industry: Entertainment
- Founded: 2007
- Founder: Doug Fitch; Edouard Getaz; Fredric Gumy
- Headquarters: New York City, US
- Area served: Worldwide
- Website: http://GiantsAreSmall.com

Giants Are Small is an entertainment company based in Brooklyn, New York. Founded in 2007 by visual artist/director Doug Fitch, producer/filmmaker Edouard Getaz and multimedia entrepreneur Frederic Gumy, the company produces live and digital entertainment ranging from opera and ballet to family entertainment.

== Origins ==
Doug Fitch and Edouard Getaz met in 2005, shortly before the production of The Soldier's Tale, which Fitch was invited to direct for the New York Philharmonic. Getaz stepped in at the last minute and became the de facto producer of the show. The production brought Fitch’s drawings to life by filming them live on stage, animated by puppeteers; while the orchestra performed the music and actors narrated the story. The miniature world created by the puppeteers was simultaneously projected on a giant screen above the orchestra. The result, dubbed “live-animation”, became a signature technique used by Giants Are Small in many of its shows.

Edouard Getaz, a longtime concert and multimedia producer and filmmaker, and Frederic Gumy, a multimedia entrepreneur, who had known each other from their days in Switzerland, had plans to develop a production company in the US and went on to partner with Fitch, who was already an established visual artist and opera director in the US. Shortly after forming Giants Are Small in 2007, the trio entered into an agreement with the Los Angeles Philharmonic to present an adaptation of Peter and the Wolf at the Walt Disney Concert Hall.

== Shows ==
=== The Soldier's Tale (2005) ===
Fitch's and Getaz' first collaboration, Igor Stravinsky's The Soldier's Tale, was presented in 2005 at the Avery Fisher Hall, Lincoln Center, New York City. It was presented by the New York Philharmonic, directed by Doug Fitch and produced by Edouard Getaz. Working with filmmaker Kitao Sakurai, Fitch developed a toy theater employing hundreds of puppets, drawings and miniature landscapes – a low-tech, hand-made little world enhanced with digital imagery created by Kasumi. Valeria Madonia danced the part of the Princess. Her performance was pre-recorded and mixed into the miniature world of drawn characters. F. Murray Abraham was the narrator. Marian Seldes was the devil and actor Tim Blake Nelson was the Soldier. This was the first time live animation — a technique featuring the animation of miniature elements in front of a camera to create moving images that are projected on a large screen in real time in synch with the orchestra’s performance — was brought to an audience of close to 3,000 people per night.

=== Peter and the Wolf (2008) ===
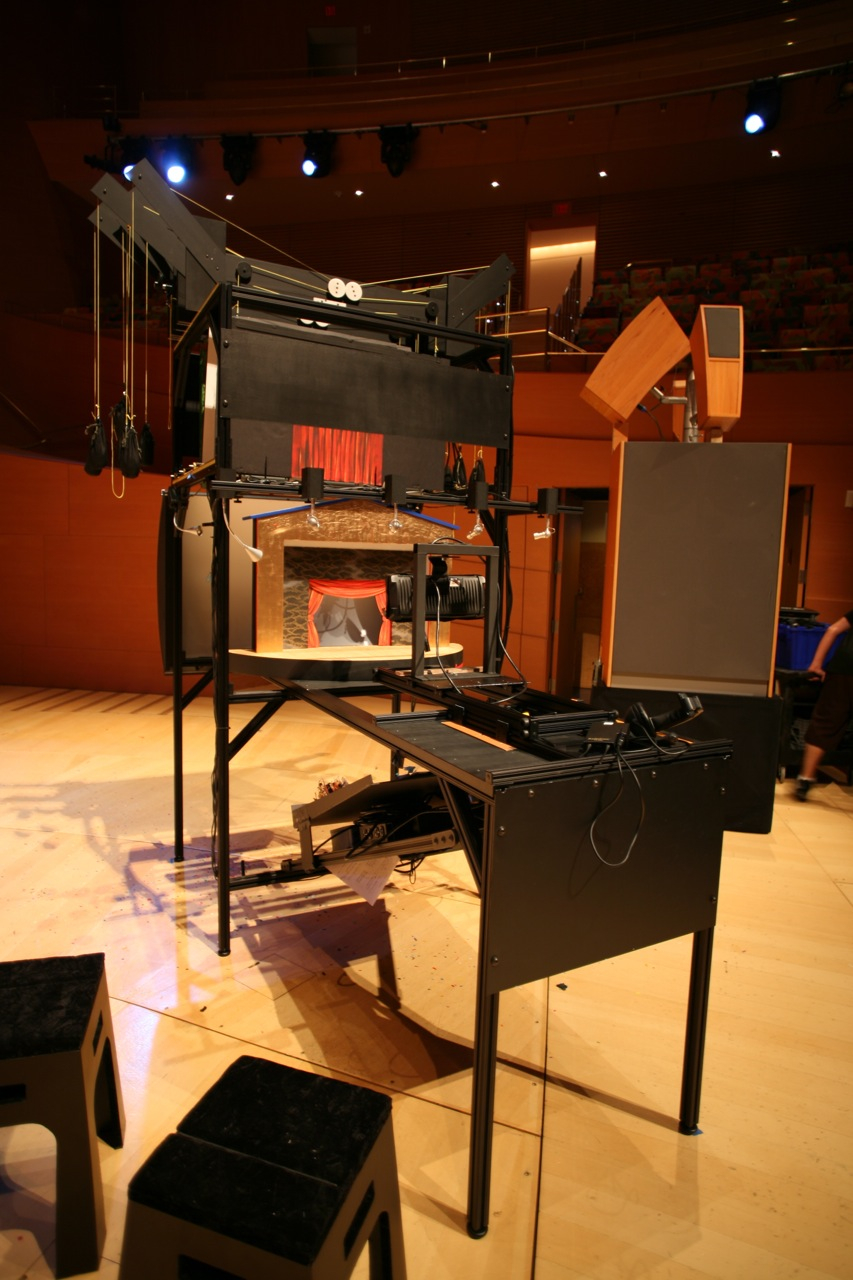
Peter and the Wolf toy theatre set

In 2008 the company presented a new version of Sergei Prokofiev’s Peter and the Wolf with the Los Angeles Philharmonic in a production that merged live classical music, live animation, and video effects together in real time. The show was directed by Doug Fitch and produced by Edouard Getaz. The story of Peter and the Wolf was preceded by a prequel by Giants Are Small called Peter and the Duck, featuring all the characters of Sergei Prokofiev's original story, but taking place in contemporary Hollywood. The piece featured excerpts from iconic pieces of classical music (including Gershwin's Rhapsody in Blue and Peer Gynt's Hall of the Mountain King, plus music from Ravel, Nielsen, Shostakovitch, Schuman, Elgar and others). The production was presented at the Walt Disney Concert Hall in September and October 2008 and played to nearly 15,000 people. Lionel Bringuier was conducting. Narrated by Michael Goldstrom.

=== Le Grand Macabre (2010) ===
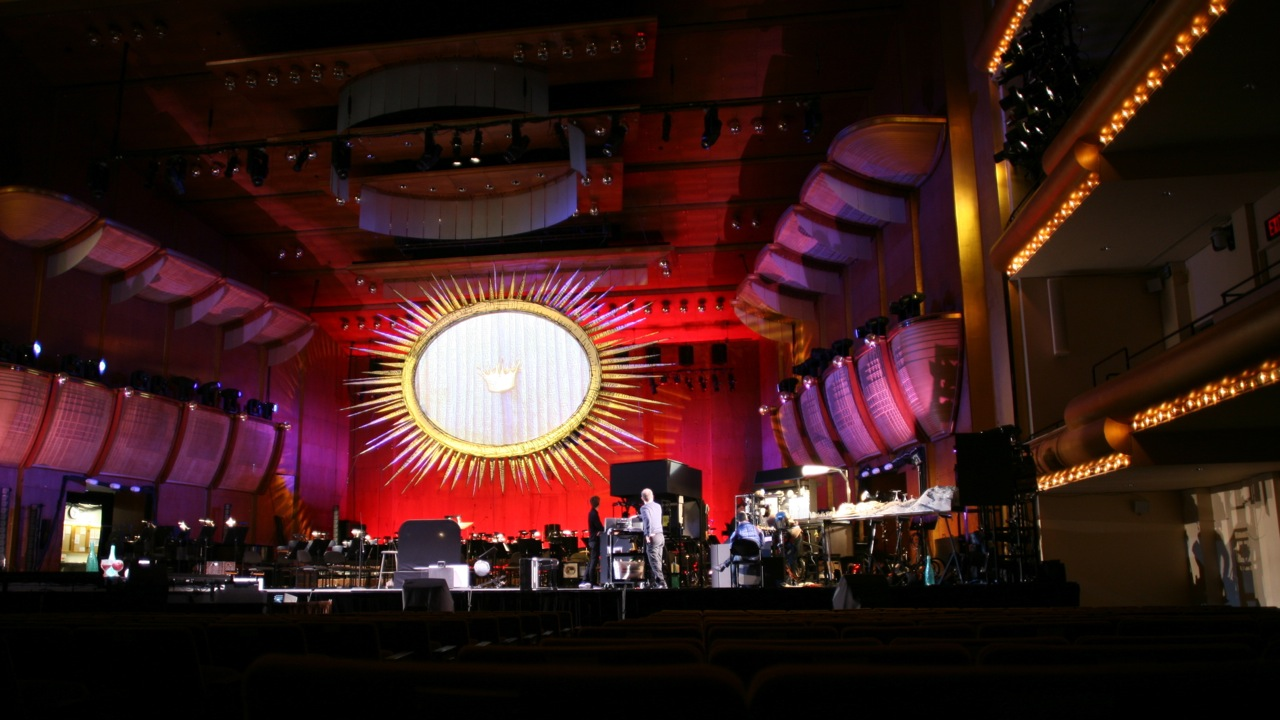
Rehearsal of The Grand Macabre, New York, 2010

In 2010, Giants Are Small created a production of György Ligeti’s absurdist opera Le Grand Macabre with the New York Philharmonic, directed by Doug Fitch (who also designed the set), conducted by Alan Gilbert and produced by Edouard Getaz. The production, which was sold out before it opened, was elected "Best Opera of the Year" by the New York Times, the New York Magazine and TimeOut NY. The production featured a cast that included Eric Owens, Melissa Parks, Barbara Hannigan, Anthony Roth Costanzo and Mark Schowalter. Costumes were designed by Catherine Zuber and the lighting was designed by Clifton Taylor. Giants Are Small's live animation was created from drawings and designs by Doug Fitch. The show was presented at Avery Fisher Hall, Lincoln Center.

=== The Cunning Little Vixen (2011) ===
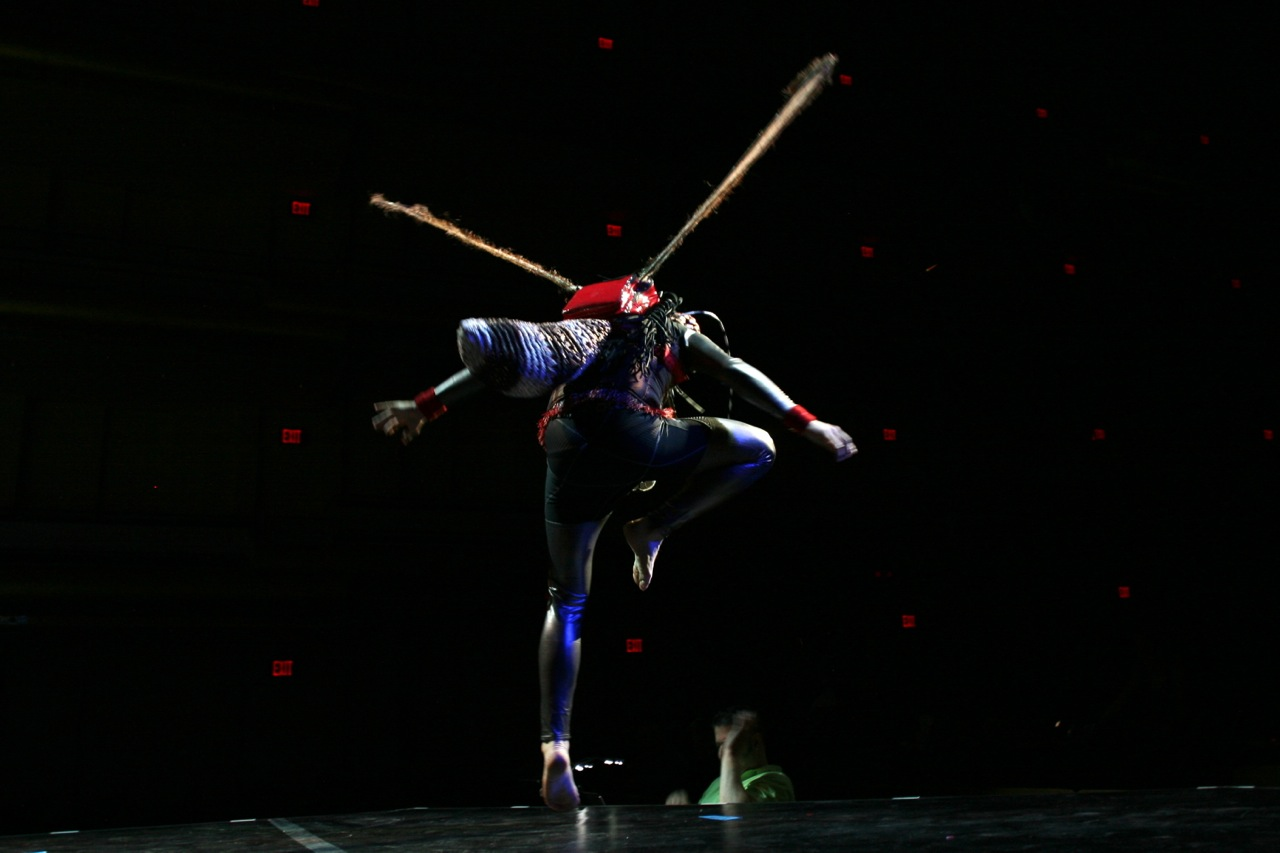
Rehearsal of The Cunning Little Vixen, New York, 2011

In 2011, Giants Are Small and the New York Philharmonic paired again to present a new production of Leoš Janáček's The Cunning Little Vixen, directed by Doug Fitch (who also designed the costumes and co-designed the set with Skip Mercier), conducted by Alan Gilbert and produced by Edouard Getaz. The show was choreographed by Karole Armitage and featured a large cast, including Isabel Bayrakdarian, Alan Opie, Melissa Parks and the Metropolitan Opera Children’s Chorus. The production was elected “Best Classical Performance of the Year 2011” by New York Magazine. The show was presented at Avery Fisher Hall, Lincoln Center.

=== A Dancer's Dream: Fairy's Kiss and Petrushka (2013) ===
Giants Are Small and the New York Philharmonic collaborated on Igor Stravinsky’s ballet Petrushka, which was conducted by Alan Gilbert, directed and designed by Doug Fitch, and video directed and produced by Edouard Getaz in June 2013 at Avery Fisher Hall, Lincoln Center. The show was partially based on a version developed in 2008 at the University of Maryland, directed by Doug Fitch in collaboration with conductor James Ross. The show included two works by Igor Stravinsky, The Fairy's Kiss (original title: Le baiser de la fée) and Petrushka, as well as one excerpt of Louis Durey's Neige. New York City Ballet's Sara Mearns was the star ballerina, representing various characters throughout the show, in a choreography by Karole Armitage. The production featured a mix of music, live filmmaking and puppetry, and ballet; it illustrated the journey of a young ballerina who gets caught in the story of her own imagination; as she realizes her desire to become a great dancer, she progressively loses her ability to have an ordinary life as the demons of ambition and love claim her as their subservient subject.

=== Dadabomb (2014) ===
Part of the Zurich Meets New York Festival, organized by the Swiss Consulate in New York, Dadabomb was a performance event celebrating Dadaism that took place at The White Box and The Box in New York City, co-curated by Doug Fitch and Edouard Getaz, and produced by Getaz. Focused on the theme of “The Death of Privacy,” the event included singers Justin Vivian Bond and Anthony Roth Costanzo, Broadway director Doug Hughes, Swiss performance artist Clarina Bezzola, dancer/choreographer Craig Salstein.

=== Gloria: A Pig Tale (2014) ===
This comic opera by Heinz Karl Gruber explores life in the imaginative world of the heroine pig, Gloria. Presented at the Metropolitan Museum of Art in May–June, 2014 as part of the New York Philharmonic Biennale, Gloria: A Pig Tale was directed and by Doug Fitch, and produced by Edouard Getaz; Alan Gilbert conducted the Juilliard School’s Axiom Ensemble.

=== Petrushka (2015) ===
In April 2015, Giants Are Small and the New York Philharmonic presented a new adaptation of Petrushka in London at the Barbican Centre. This was the European première of a Giants Are Small production. Directed and designed by Doug Fitch, produced by Edouard Getaz (also credited as video director) and conducted by Alan Gilbert, the production featured puppetry directed by Tom Lee and pre-recorded video appearances by dancer Sara Mearns (Colombine), bass-baritone Eric Owens (The Moor), and countertenor Anthony Roth Costanzo (Petrushka).

=== Peter and the Wolf in Hollywood ===
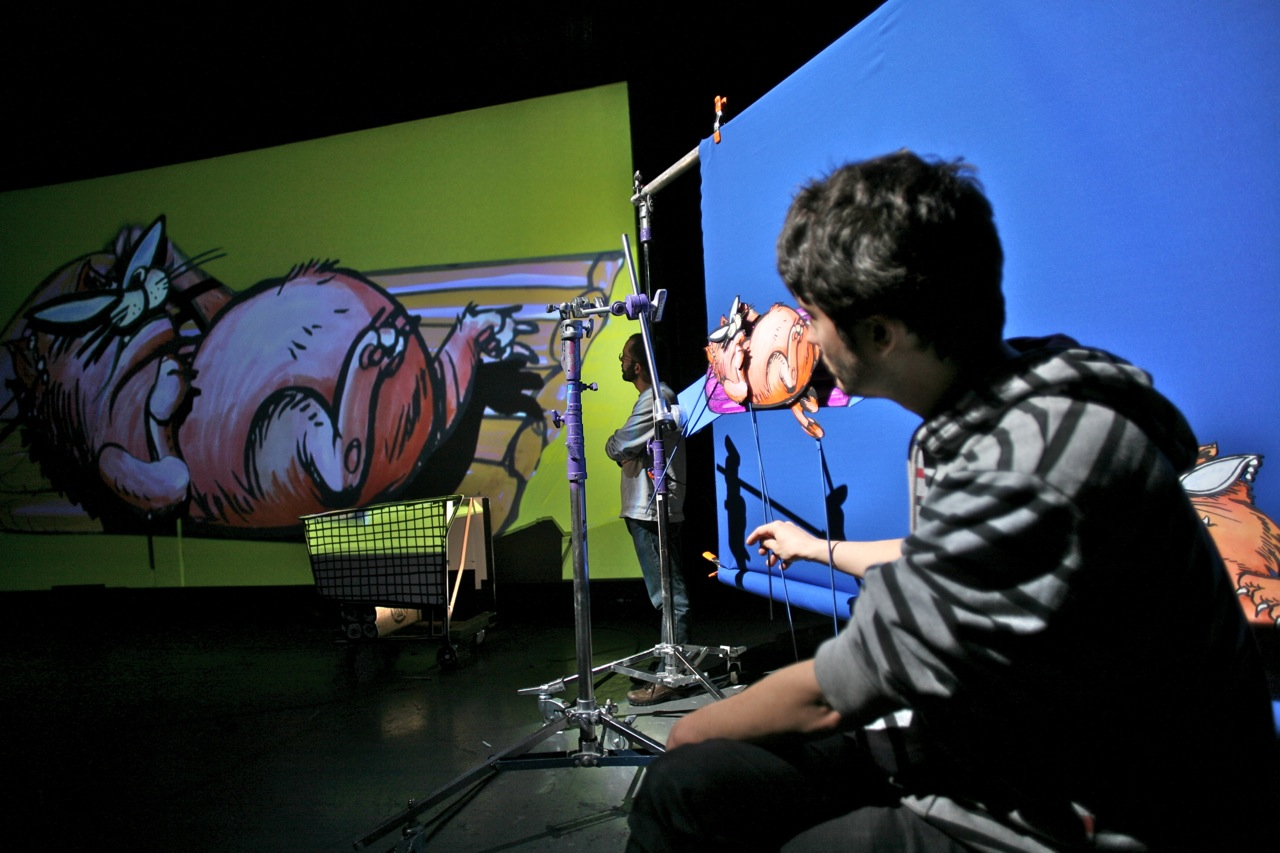
Puppeteer during a workshop, 2010

After the success of Peter and the Wolf with the Los Angeles Philharmonic, Giants Are Small has been working on a new adaptation for a touring production. For this purpose, the company has led various workshops and has been experimenting with state-of-the-art technology. The show was in development for a theatre in the round tented production, with plans to tour the major cities in the US and Europe.

== Film, video, multimedia ==
=== A Dancer’s Dream: Two Works by Stravinsky (2013) ===
A film based on Giants Are Small’s production of A Dancer’s Dream for the New York Philharmonic's program, A Dancer's Dream: Two Works by Stravinsky was distributed in cinemas in the US by SpectiCast beginning September 2013. The film, directed by Habib Azar, features the complete production and behind-the-scenes footage, as well as an intermission feature on Stravinsky's history with the New York Philharmonic, including material from the New York Philharmonic Digital Archives.

=== W Hot Culture (2013-2014) ===
Starring the puppet Wigglesworth, “W Hot Culture” is a series of brief web shows focused on New York cultural events. The series was produced and directed byDoug Fitch and Edouard Getaz, with Fitch performing the puppet Wigglesworth. Guest stars included fashion designer Isaac Mizrahi, actress Sigourney Weaver, opera singer Deborah Voigt, and other arts and show business personalities. A short documentary on the making of the series, directed by journalist Axel Gerdau, was aired on the JetBlue / New York Times video channel.

=== Peter and the Wolf in Hollywood (2015) ===
In November 2015, in co-production with Universal Music and its classical music label Deutsche Grammophon, Giants Are Small launched Peter and the Wolf in Hollywood, based on the classic 1937 work by Russian composer Sergei Prokofiev, a project appearing in app, CD, and digital album formats. Co-directed by Doug Fitch (also credited as designer and illustrator) and Edouard Getaz (also credited as producer, video director, and sound designer), the project features the Prokofiev work combined with an original prequel that’s accompanied by a selection of musical works by classical composers such as Richard Wagner, Robert Schumann, Gustav Mahler, and Eric Satie. The project is narrated in English by rock musician Alice Cooper; in German (Peter und der Wolf in Hollywood) by rock musician Campino, lead singer of the Düsseldorf band Die Toten Hosen and in Dutch (Peter En De Wolf In Hollywood) by Dutch actor/comedian Paul Haenen. Giants Are Small's co-founder Frederic Gumy is credited as producer.

== Artistic collaborations ==
Over the years, Giants Are Small has developed an ongoing relationship with New York Philharmonic's Music Director and conductor Alan Gilbert, which has led to five collaborations Le Grand Macabre, The Cunning Little Vixen, A Dancer's Dream, Gloria: A Pig Tale, and Petrushka). The company has also worked on an ongoing basis with lighting designer Clifton Taylor, set designer Skip Mercier, kinetic sculptor Chris Fitch, projection designer Marty Brinkerhoff and filmmaker Andrei Severny. Giants Are Small collaborated with costume designer Catherine Zuber for their production of Le Grand Macabre, and choreographer Karole Armitage for The Cunning Little Vixen and A Dancer's Dream. Artists with whom Giants Are Small have collaborated with include dancer Sara Mearns, rock musicians Alice Cooper and Campino, conductor Alexander Shelley, and music producer Sid McLauchlan.
