= Joseph Abboud =

American fashion designer (born 1950)

- Born: May 5, 1950 (age 76); Boston, Massachusetts, U.S.
- Education: University of Massachusetts Boston
- Occupation: Fashion designer
- Labels: Joseph Abboud; Jaz
- Children: 2

Joseph Abboud (born May 5, 1950), is an American menswear fashion designer and author.

== Early life and education ==
Joseph Abboud was born in Boston, Massachusetts. The Abbouds were a working-class Lebanese Maronite Catholic family that started out in the South End of Boston, and later moved to Roslindale. Abboud's father Joseph worked in a candy factory and his mother, Lila, was a seamstress. He had one sister, Nancy Ash; she and Lila died of breast cancer.

Abboud graduated from the University of Massachusetts Boston in 1972, then studied at the Sorbonne in Paris.

== Career ==
While in high school, he worked first for Thom McAn dyeing women's shoes and then the Anderson-Little men's store, where he sold suits. As a college student, he worked part-time at Louis Boston. Abboud stated: "Louis Boston was a huge part of my career. I really landed in a world of very glamorous style, beautiful clothes, just the world of what international fashion was about. If this had never happened, then the rest of it wouldn't have happened." Abboud became a buyer at Louis Boston at age 23. Over the course of twelve years, he worked as buyer, merchandiser, and eventually coordinator of promotion and advertising.

Abboud joined Ralph Lauren Corporation in 1981, eventually becoming associate director of menswear design. He launched his own label in spring 1987. In 1988, JA Apparel was created as a joint venture between Abboud and GFT (Gruppo Finanziario Tessile) US.

In 1991 Abboud worked with fashion director Peter Speliopoulos. Abboud was the first designer to win the CFDA award as Best Menswear Designer two years in a row. Many of Abboud's famous friends are also his customers, including American trumpeter and composer Wynton Marsalis, author and former TV news anchor Tom Brokaw, and former Boston Red Sox shortstop Nomar Garciaparra.

Abboud sold his trademarks and name to JA Apparel for $65 million in 2000. The company was acquired by private-equity firm J.W. Childs Associates for $73 million in 2004, and Abboud left JA Apparel in 2005.

Abboud launched a new line called Jaz in 2007. He also created the Black Brown 1826 line for the Lord & Taylor department store in 2008. The year 2008 also marked the opening of Abboud's first stores in China.

In 2010, Abboud became the chief creative officer of HMX, owner of the Hart Schaffner Marx and Hickey Freeman brands. HMX made an offer to buy JA Apparel for $90 million in 2011. In December 2012, Abboud became Chief Creative Director of Men's Wearhouse. While Abboud was employed as its creative director, Men's Wearhouse Inc. (now Tailored Brands Inc.) reacquired the Abboud and JOE by Joseph Abboud trademarks in 2013.

After getting back the legal right to his brand in 2013, Abboud set up e-commerce, opened a Madison Avenue flagship store and produced full-scale fashion shows.

In March 2020, WHP Global acquired the trademarks to the Joseph Abboud brand from Tailored Brands. In turn, Tailored Brands entered into a licensing agreement with WHP Global for the continuing rights to sell and rent Joseph Abboud apparel and selected accessories in the U.S. and Canada.

== Published works ==
Abboud wrote Threads: My Life Behind the Seams in the High-Stakes World of Fashion in which he thoroughly describes the fashion industry from designing and selling clothes to naming colors. He also writes about some of the negative experiences that he has endured such as racial profiling after the September 11 attacks, a court battle over legal rights to his name, and a failed flagship store that is now occupied by Donna Karan.

== Personal life ==
Abboud married Lynn Weinstein on June 6, 1976. They have two daughters and reside in Bedford, New York. He frequently appeared on Don Imus's radio show and was a regular caller to the New York City radio station, WFAN, to discuss his beloved Boston Red Sox, the New York Yankees' rival. In 2002, he was the first fashion designer to throw out the opening pitch at Boston's Fenway Park for a Red Sox game.

Abboud's mother and sister both succumbed to breast cancer. As a result, Abboud has become a breast cancer activist who designed a one-of-a-kind GMC Sierra vehicle to fundraise for a Concept:Cure charity event and has participated in many other charity events for breast cancer research. GM offered a Joseph Abboud Limited Edition Buick Regal GS and LS from 2001 to 2004, and a Joseph Abboud Limited Edition Buick Rendezvous for 2004 and 2005. Abboud was honored as one of five "Men for the Cure" by GQ magazine and General Motors' Concept:Cure during a breast cancer fund-raiser. Concept:Cure raised $2.6 million for breast cancer organizations. Abboud says he has a personal interest in curing breast cancer, because his mother and sister both died from the disease.

== See also ==
- List of Maronites
