= Peter Speliopoulos =

American fashion designer

Peter Speliopoulos, born in 1961 in Springfield, Massachusetts, is an American fashion designer.

== Life as a designer ==
Speliopoulos studied fashion at Parsons School of Design in New York and graduated with a BFA in 1981. Speliopoulos is best friends with fashion designer Isaac Mizrahi who also attended Parsons. His first job as a fashion designer was as assistant stylist with Laura Biagiotti in Rome in 1982. He then worked briefly at the French couture house of Christian Dior and later for New York sportswear designer Gloria Sachs whose label went out of business in 1992. In 1985, Speliopoulos was named creative director at Carolyne Roehm Inc., a New York fashion house that had been created in 1984. He left in 1991 to become fashion director with Joseph Abboud.

From 1993 to 1997, Speliopoulos then worked as a designer for Donna Karan in New York. He replaced Narciso Rodriguez as head of design for the women's collection at Nino Cerruti in mid-1997. While at Cerruti, he gave the label a fresh modern look using fine detail and exquisite fabrics. He left Cerruti in 2002 to return to New York as Vice President of Design for Donna Karan New York. He has stayed with Donna Karan, a fashion house owned by the French LVMH Group, since then. In 1998 he said that his time at Donna Karan between 1993 and 1997 "was invaluable to me in getting to where I am now at Cerruti."

Speliopoulos has also worked as a costume designer for Karole Armitage, a New York ballet dancer who owns her own dance company. In the summer of 2000, he designed the costumes for the Athens Opera production of The Birds by Aristophanes. The collaboration with Armitage continued until 2003. He has also worked as a costume designer with the Rambert Dance Company in London for which Karole Armitage was a choreographer.

He says that he is always inspired by the construction of Balenciaga, the essentialism of Halston and the genius of Yves St. Laurent. He tries to make his garments a mix of feminine sensuality and men's tailoring, creating versatility in a woman's wardrobe.

Speliopoulos - together with his partner for more than 20 years, Robert Turner - is a Friends for Life Annual Fund donor at the GMHC.
