= Anderson-Little =

Clothing Manufacturer and Retailer in America

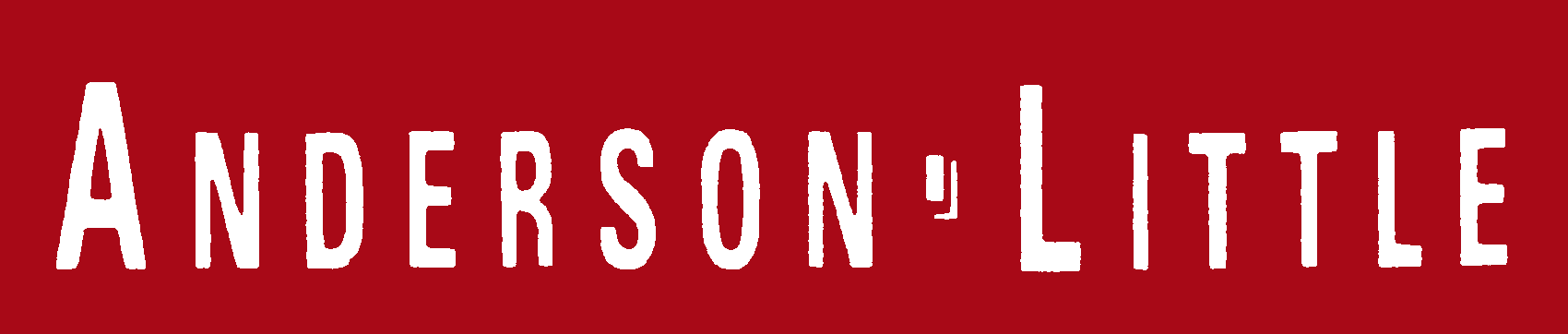
Anderson-Little logo

Derelict Anderson–Little store in Rhode Island, shown shortly before demolition, displays the iconic red and white color scheme used in the company's signage

Anderson–Little was an American clothing manufacturer and retailer of the 20th century, particularly of men's suits. It operated in the eastern United States, and in New England in particular.

The brand has been revived in the 21st century as a small internet retailer.

== Foundation and success ==
Anderson–Little was founded in the Boston area in 1918 or in the 1920s by Morris B. Anderson and Albert Little. Anderson had been born in Russia and came to America as a teen; before co-founding Anderson-Little he had worked for Singer Sewing Machine, and managed firms including the Morris B. Anderson Clothing Company. In the 1930s – perhaps 1933, or perhaps 1936 – the company relocated to Fall River, Massachusetts, then a textile-manufacturing center. (Note: According to the company website the company was founded in Fall River, in 1933, but other sources contradict this)

The company opened a retail store in Fall River in 1936, and after World War II they opened their first factory showroom (a store in a factory), becoming a pioneer of factory–to–consumer retailing. These outlets were relatively austere operations with suits being hung on racks made of pipes assembled by company hands. Their main slogan and jingle for decades, "The Best Factory Makes the Best Clothing", emphasized the manufacturing side of the business. In 1956, the Fall River factory was producing 3000 garments every week and had employed over 1000 people.

By 1960 they had eleven stores, all in New England. In 1966 they were acquired by Richman Brothers, at which time there were 40 stores. In 1969 Richman Brothers (including Anderson–Little) was acquired by the retail giant Woolworth. In 1981, the company created three new brands – Strathmore, Shefford, and Southport – and added business attire for women (they had formerly only offered men's clothing).

Reports in contemporary news publications showed that the growth of stores may have been much slower than the figures given by articles that were written decades later. The Daily Boston Globe reported that the firm had 7 stores in 1950 and 9 stores in 1956. Women's Wear Daily reported that the firm had 19 stores in 4 states in 1966 and 22 stores in 1967.

During the time of Woolworth's ownership, Dallas Cowboys quarterback Roger Staubach served as the company's celebrity spokesman.

== Decline and fall ==
Under Woolworth control Anderson–Little grew to 100 stores and beyond.

However, when Woolworth began to have financial troubles, Anderson & Little followed. By 1992 the company had swollen to 260 stores, three factories, and two distribution centers, but was no longer profitable. That same year Woolworth (just a few years short of its own 1997 demise) closed all but seven Anderson–Little stores and announced it would shut the division down entirely, but a buyer was found and the remnants of Anderson–Little were sold to Cliftex Manufacturing (owners of Gentleman's Wearhouse (not to be confused with Men's Wearhouse) that same year. Cliftex then rebranded some of their Gentlemen's Wearhouse stores as Anderson–Little stores and also began selling clothing under the Anderson–Little brand in their Gentleman's Wearhouse stores.

In 1992, Cliftex operated 26 Anderson–Little stores, but closed 16 of them that year. Cliftex Manufacturing closed the remaining Anderson–Little stores in 1998.

== Revival ==
Ten years later, in 2008, Stuart Anderson (great-grandson of founder Morris Anderson) and his son Scott Anderson reclaimed the brand, which had become available after Cliftex went bankrupt, and started a new clothing company under that name.

This revived company, based in Miami, is a web-only retailer, with products made in America. Their first product was a classic blue blazer, and as of 2023 that and a black version remain their sole product.

In a planned succession Stuart Anderson retired in 2014 and Anderson-Little is now owned and run by Scott Anderson, the fifth generation of Andersons to run the brand.
