= Clifton Taylor =

American theatrical designer

Clifton Taylor (born 1963) is an American theatrical designer who is based in New York City.

== Biography ==
Clifton Taylor, scenic and lighting designer for the theater has worked on Broadway, and in opera and ballet throughout the world. His Broadway credits include: "Jay Johnson: The Two and Only" (2006), "Frozen" (2004)(Lucille Lortel Nomination), "Hot Feet", (2006) (Henry Hewes Nomination). Recent Off-Broadway credits include: "Freud's Last Session", "On the Town" (City Center Encores!), "Face the Music" (City Center Encores!), "Anne of Green Gables" (Theatreworks USA / Lucille Lortel Theatre), "Scattergood", "Endgame", "The Streets of New York", "Last Easter". Mr. Taylor collaborates with Giants Are Small on opera productions such as Le Grand Macabre by the New York Philharmonic.

In the world of dance, his designs have been commissioned by major companies around the world, including: American Ballet Theatre (New York), the San Francisco Ballet, the Alvin Ailey American Dance Theater (NY) among many others. He is the resident designer for Karole Armitage Gone! Dance Company & Elisa Monte Dance and has been the Lighting Director for the "Fall for Dance Festival" at both New York City Center and at the Orange County Performing Arts Center since its inception in 2004.

In addition, Mr. Taylor is a teacher and lecturer on theatrical lighting and projection design. Over the past decade, he has led master classes in Cambodia and in Indonesia, where he has ongoing relationships with several arts organizations and foundations. He currently is a professor of Lighting Design at University of North Carolina School of the Arts. In addition, he has guest lectured throughout the United States at major universities and professional conferences. He was the lighting consultant for "Teatro del Lago", the southernmost opera house in the world, in Frutillar, Chile. Mr. Taylor was educated at New York University, Tisch School of the Arts.

== Teaching ==
- Juilliard School Dance Division 2008 - 2010
- The Broadway Lighting MasterClass 1997–2014
- University of North Carolina School of the Arts 2019–Present

== Awards ==
- Asian Cultural Council Grantee
- Connecticut Critics Circle Award for Outstanding Lighting Design for Journey's End at the Westport Country Playhouse, Directed by Gregory Boyd
- Knight of Illumination Award
- 2025 Publications Award Merit Award
