= Gloria Sachs =

American fashion designer

- Born: Gloria Mildred Wasserman; February 17, 1927; New York City, U.S.
- Died: March 12, 2012 (aged 85)
- Education: Skidmore College; Cranbrook Academy of Art
- Occupation: Fashion designer

Gloria Sachs (February 17, 1927 – March 12, 2012) was an American fashion designer whose company tailored for the increasing percentage of American women employed in professional and management positions through the 1970s and 1980s.

== Early life ==
Gloria Mildred Wasserman was born on February 17, 1927, in Manhattan, New York City. She grew up in Scarsdale and studied at Skidmore College, graduating with a degree in the fine arts in 1947 despite entering as a math major. She then attended the Cranbrook Academy of Art, in Michigan, where she studied textile design. In Paris, she studied in the workshop of the painter Fernand Léger, trained under architects Franco Albini and Giò Ponti, and modeled for Balenciaga and Pierre Balmain. From 1948 to 1949, she designed textiles for the furniture designers Hans Knoll and Herman Miller.

== Career ==
Sachs exhibited artwork at the Pratt Institute (1949), the Philadelphia Art Alliance (1950), the Art Institute of Chicago (1950), and the Museum of Modern Art (1951). After she moved back to New York in 1951, she found work at the Bloomingdale's department store as an executive trainee, feeling as though "painting was too lonely a career for a young woman". Eventually she was promoted to assistant buyer and later fashion coordinator. Sachs attested that, around this time, she first brought Capri pants to the United States and called them "capris", after seeing them on her honeymoon to the Italian island of Capri in 1953.

In 1958, Sachs founded Gloria Sachs Red Barn, a clothing company that designed for preteens. According to Sachs, the company experienced growth despite not initially receiving financial assistance, but after two years she sold the company for around $50,000 to pay debts. She briefly returned to Bloomingdale's to work as fashion director for children's clothing until 1962, and was then employed by Saks Fifth Avenue as an in-house designer of preteen clothing from 1963 to 1965.

=== Gloria Sachs Designs ===
Sachs founded the clothing company Gloria Sachs Designs Ltd. in 1970. Her company sought to design fashionable clothing for working women during a period in the country when there were significant increases in the number of women in professional positions and management. Sach's line mostly utilized classic patterns—plaids, dots, foulards, and paisleys—made in unconventional color combinations. Through the decade it focused on separates, including skirts, shirts and coats, tailored in matching fabrics. In the 1980s she continued this style, producing uncoordinated suits as well as sweaters paired with skirts and pants. Sachs' line was sold at stores such as Bergdorf Goodman, Lord & Taylor, Saks Fifth Avenue, and Neiman Marcus.

Sachs oversaw both the financial and creative operations of her company. As most of the company's fabrics were produced in Europe, she spent four to six months abroad every year managing production. The company's knitted fabrics were produced at a mill in Northern Ireland that she purchased in 1985 following a seven-year working relationship. She founded a holding company, The Greenwich Group, to take ownership of the corporation that owned the mill and also operate in the international market.

Sachs was nominated for a Coty Award in 1983, although it was ultimately awarded to Willi Smith. From 1982 to 1984 she was president of Fashion Group, a professional organization for the fashion industry, having joined the organization in the 1950s.

=== Later life ===
Sachs had closed her clothing company by 1994, although she remained active in the industry. Prior to her death, she was arranging the opening of the Fashion Group's first chapter in Shanghai and received an invitation to be a visiting scholar to the China Central Academy of Fine Arts.

== Personal life ==
Sachs was married to Irwin Sachs, a native of Rye, New York. Irwin was the president of the Willard Fairchild Corporation, a manufacturer of women's clothing based in New York. They later divorced.

Sachs died on March 12, 2012, aged 85, at her Manhattan home.
