= Richman Brothers =

Former American retail men's clothing chain

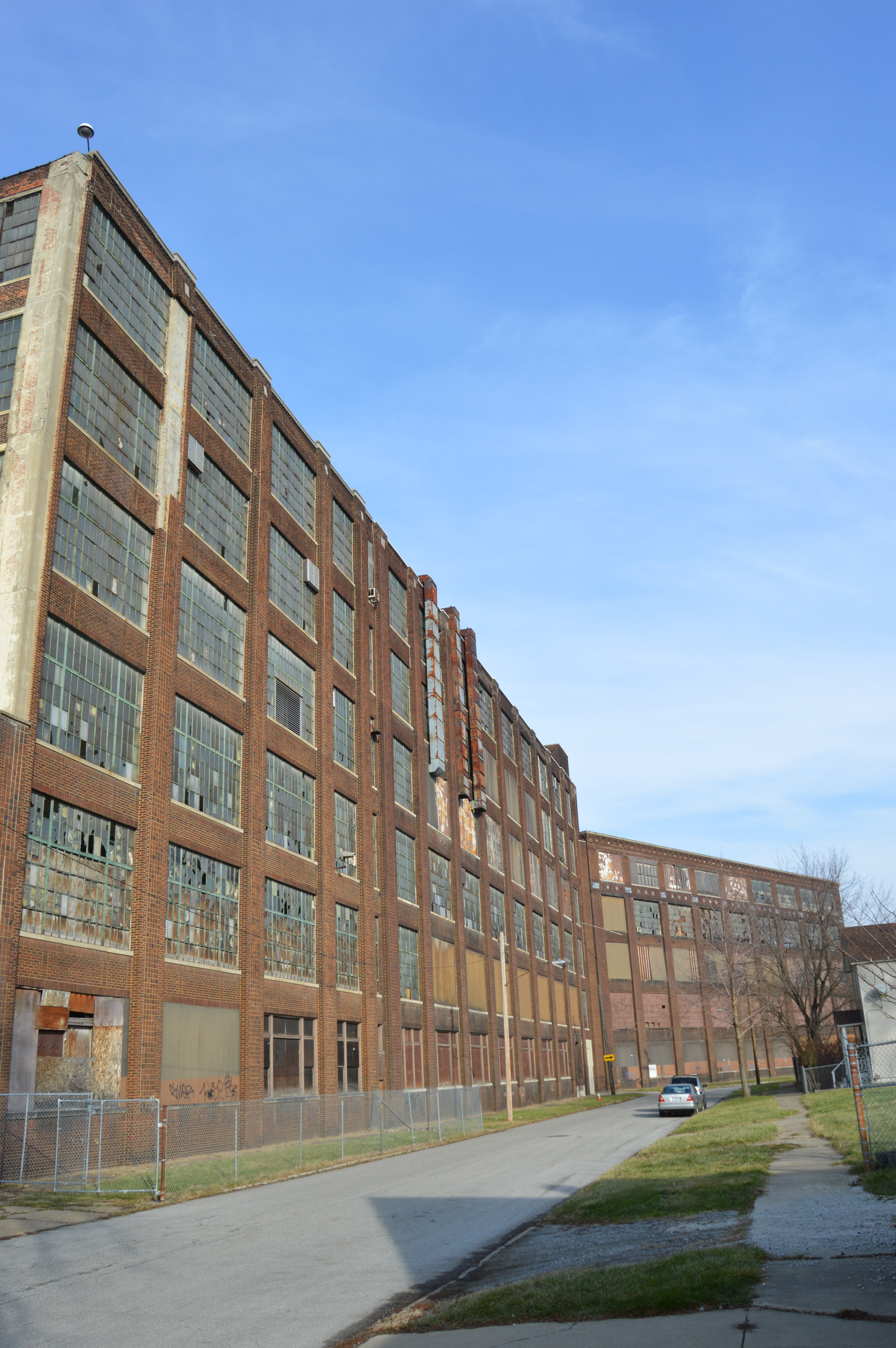
- Richman Brothers abandoned factory. 1600 55th Street, Cleveland, Ohio.
- Type: Subsidiary
- Industry: Retail
- Founded: 1853
- Defunct: 1990
- Fate: Closed
- Headquarters: Cleveland, Ohio, United States
- Area served: Ohio, Nebraska, Indiana, and Wisconsin
- Products: Men's clothing including suits, coats, and hats
- Parent: F. W. Woolworth Company

Richman Brothers was a retail men's clothing chain in the United States. It was a subsidiary of the F. W. Woolworth Company.

== History ==
Richman was founded in Ohio in 1853. It came to be known as a men’s fine clothing store. Though initially the stores would sell only men’s suits, coats, and hats, during the last years of its existence it also sold women’s clothing. There were several stores across the United States, including Nebraska, Indiana, and Wisconsin.

The company allowed its workers to purchase stock below market price, and provided funds for supporting the staff during downturns. As a result of their worker-friendly policies they had little labor trouble during the Depression.

Richman closed in the early 1990s.
