= Bettijane Sills =

American ballerina

Bettijane Sills is an American ballerina. Sills has had a long career in theater and as a soloist in the New York City Ballet. During her career, she danced for both George Balanchine and Jerome Robbins.

== Biography ==
Sills was born and raised in New York City, the daughter of Michael Siegel, a Broadway musician/singer who also performed with the Boston Pops. Sills began acting as a child, appearing in Broadway productions, including the musical 'Seventeen', and television programs, including 'Studio One' and The Children's Hour.' She studied dance at the School of American Ballet, and was accepted to both the acting and dance programs at the New York High School of Performing Arts (the Fame school now called LaGuardia High School of Music & Art and Performing Arts). She chose to major in dance.

== Career ==
She was invited by George Balanchine to join New York City Ballet in 1961. She was promoted to Soloist in 1964, and danced principal roles in many works, including Western Symphony, Jewels, Who Cares?, Divertimento #15 and The Nutcracker. During her 11 years with the New York City Ballet, she performed in numerous productions all over the world and received critical acclaim as the "Wife" in Jerome Robbins' 1972 revival of The Concert.

In recent years, she has acted as a repetiteur for the Balanchine Trust, staging the Balanchine repertory and choreographing numerous works for the Purchase Dance Company as well as several other companies throughout the United States. In 1996, she staged Balanchine's Serenade at the Hong Kong Academy for the Performing Arts. She was designated by the Balanchine Trust to stage Allegro Brilliante for the Orlando Ballet in Florida in 2006. She then returned to Asia in January 2007, to stage Serenade for the Taipei National University of the Arts.

She is currently a tenured professor at State University of New York at Purchase and has served on the Conservatory of Dance faculty at Purchase College since 1979.

Broadway, Balanchine, and Beyond: A Memoir, which Bettijane Sills co-wrote with Elizabeth McPherson, was published by University Press of Florida in 2019. It was reviewed by Marcia Siegel in the Arts Fuse and by Helen Shaw in The New York Times. Sills wrote a letter to the editor as a response to The New York Times review to defend her career decisions.
