= Le baiser de la fée =

1928 ballet by Igor Stravinsky based on themes by Pyotr Ilyich Tchaikovsky

Le Baiser de la fée
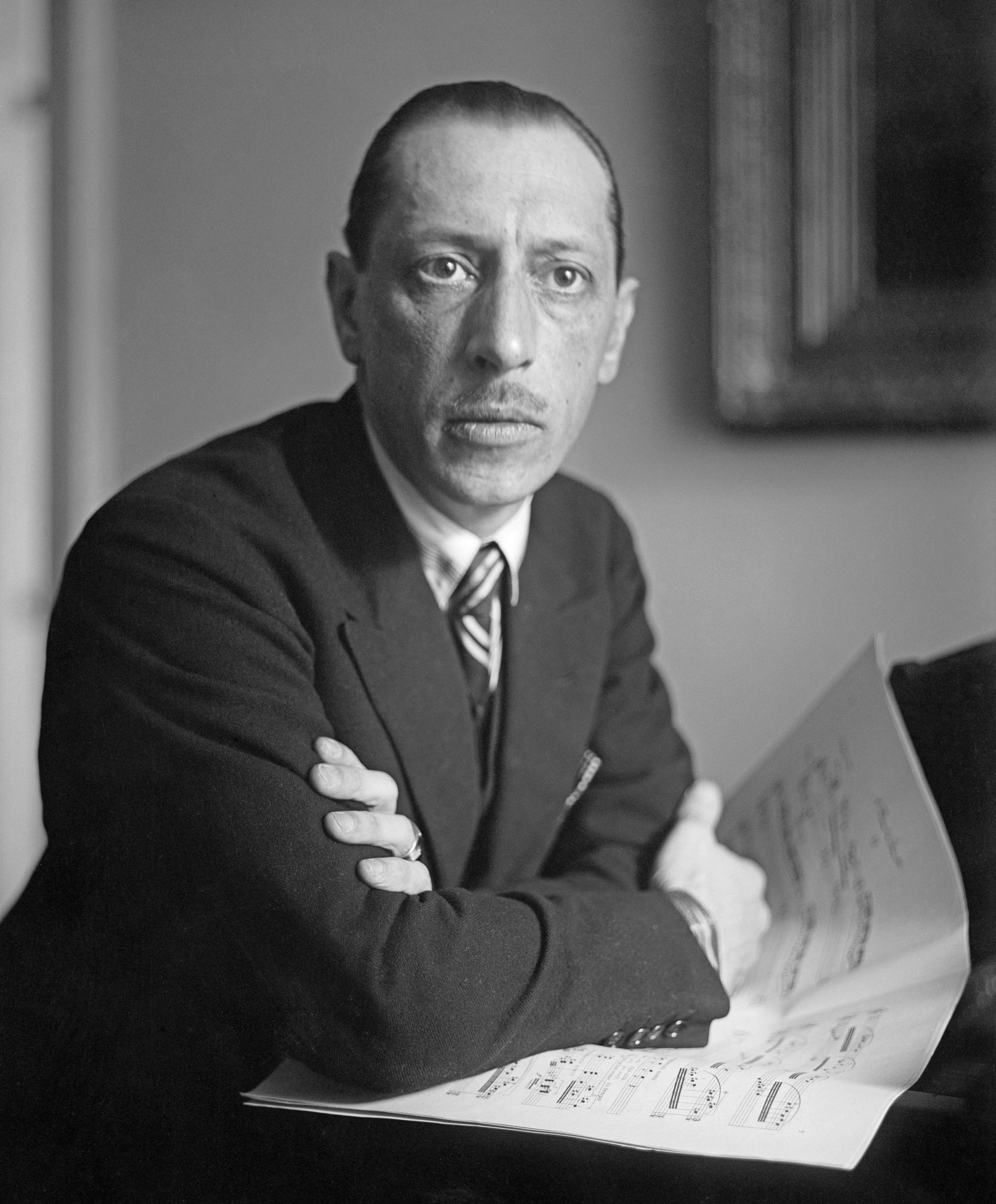
- Igor Stravinsky in the 1920s
- Choreographer: Bronislava Nijinska
- Music: Igor Stravinsky
- Premiere: 27 November 1928; Paris
- Original ballet company: Ballets Russes
- Genre: Neoclassical ballet
- Type: classical ballet

Le Baiser de la fée (The Fairy's Kiss) is a neoclassical ballet in one act and four scenes composed by Igor Stravinsky in 1928 and revised in 1950 for George Balanchine and the New York City Ballet. Based on Hans Christian Andersen's short story Isjomfruen (English: The Ice-Maiden), the work is an homage to Pyotr Ilyich Tchaikovsky, for the 35th anniversary of the composer's death. Stravinsky elaborated several melodies from early piano pieces and songs by Tchaikovsky in his score. A commission by Ida Rubinstein from 1927, the ballet was choreographed by Bronislava Nijinska and premiered in Paris on 27 November 1928.

In 1937, Balanchine made a full-length ballet for his American Ballet, which premiered on 27 April, at the Old Metropolitan Opera House, New York City. His 1950 version premiered on 28 November, at City Center of Music and Drama, New York, at which time it was presented under the English translation of the title, The Fairy's Kiss (the original French title is now more commonly used by English-speakers).

In 1960 Kenneth MacMillan choreographed his own version for The Royal Ballet.

== Themes ==
In his conversations with Robert Craft, Stravinsky did not specify which Tchaikovsky pieces he drew upon, but "Danses suisses" quotes one of the more easily identifiable Tchaikovsky themes, the "Humoresque" from Two Pieces, Opus 10 (1871). The musicologist David Drew provided several musical sources in his liner notes for the 1963 Decca recording of the ballet by Ernest Ansermet:

- Scene I: Andante. Figures from Op. 19 No. 4 and the Barcarolle 'Juin' from Op. 37 bis
- Vivace agitato. Figure from Op. 54 No. 7
- Scene II: Tempo giusto. Humoresque Op. 10 No. 2 and Reverie du Soir, Op. 19 No. 1
- Valse. Natha-Valse, Op. 51 No. 4
- Scene III: Allegretto grazioso. Scherzo humoresque Op. 19 No. 2
- Doppio movimento. Feuillet d'Album Op. 19 No. 3
- Pas de deux. Nocturne, Op. 19 No. 4, Più mosso section
- Scene—Andante non tanto. None but the lonely heart, Op. 6 No. 6

"In addition to the above, Robert Craft—joint author with Stravinsky of Expositions and Developments, the composer's third volume of autobiographical musings—supplies the following titles:"

- Scherzo à la Russe, Op. 1 No. 1 for piano
- Painfully and Sweetly, Op. 6 No. 3 for voice and piano
- The Mujik plays the harmonica, Op. 39 No. 12 for piano
- In the Village, Op. 40 No. 7 for piano
- Danse russe, Op. 40 No. 10 for piano
- Salon valse, Op. 51 No. 1 for piano
- Lullaby on a storm (Berceuse), Op. 54 No. 10 for voice and piano
- Serenade, Op. 63 No. 6 for voice and piano

== Divertimento from Le Baiser de la fée ==
The Divertimento from Le Baiser de la fée is a concert suite for orchestra based on music from the ballet. Stravinsky arranged it in collaboration with Samuel Dushkin in 1934 and revised it in 1949. It has four movements:

1. Sinfonia
2. Danses suisses
3. Scherzo (Au moulin)
4. Pas de deux
  1. Adagio
  2. Variation
  3. Coda

In 1932 Samuel Dushkin and the composer produced a version for violin and piano, using the same title. Another episode from the ballet was arranged for violin and piano by Dushkin with the title Ballad. However, the latter only received the composer’s assent in 1947 after the French violinist Jeanne Gautier put forward an arrangement.

Balanchine created an entirely new work for the City Ballet's Stravinsky Festival, using excerpts from the concert suite and the original ballet. The premiere took place on 21 June 1972, at the New York State Theater, Lincoln Center. In 1974, Balanchine incorporated Tchaikovsky's "None but the Lonely Heart" for a new pas de deux.

== Original casts ==
=== American Ballet ===
- Kathryn Mullowny
- Gisella Caccialanza
- Leda Anchutina
- Annabelle Lyon
- William Dollar

=== New York City Ballet: Divertimento from Le Baiser de la fée ===
- Patricia McBride
- Bettijane Sills
- Carol Sumner
- Helgi Tomasson

== Sources ==
- Playbill, New York City Ballet, Friday, June 20, 2008
- Repertory Week, New York City Ballet, Spring Season, 2008 repertory, week 8

=== Reviews ===
- NY Times by Alastair Macaulay, February 9, 2008
- NY Times by Jennifer Dunning, May 30, 2006
- NY Times by Gia Kourlas, May 30, 2005
- NY Times by Anna Kisselgoff, November 23, 1987
- NY Times by Anna Kisselgoff, June 13, 1981
- NY Times by Anna Kisselgoff, November 20, 1979
- NY Times by Anna Kisselgoff, February 4, 1974
- NY Times by Clive Barnes, June 22, 1972
- NY Times by John Martin, November 26, 1951
- Sunday New York Times by John Martin, May 30, 1937
- Sunday NY Times by John Martin, May 2, 1937
- NY Times by John Martin, April 28, 1937
