= Skip Mercier =

American set designer (1954–2021)

- Born: July 20, 1954; Methuen, Massachusetts, U.S.
- Died: March 11, 2021 (aged 66); Rowayton, Connecticut, U.S.
- Education: University of California, Berkeley (BA); Yale School of Drama (MFA)
- Occupations: Costume designer; set designer; professor
- Years active: 1983–2021
- Spouse: Robert Frazier
- Children: 2

G. W. "Skip" Mercier (July 20, 1954 – March 11, 2021) was an American costume, puppet, and set designer. He has designed for over 370 productions of theater, musical theater, opera, dance, film, and television. He is best known for his set and costume designs for Juan Darien: A Carnival Mass in which he received a Tony Award Nomination for Scenery and two Drama Desk Nominations for Scenic Design and Costume Design in 1997. He was a member of the faculty at the University of Washington School of Drama, where he taught scenic design and costume design to both graduate students and undergraduates.

== Life ==
Mercier was born in Methuen, Massachusetts on July 20, 1954, and was raised in nearby Haverhill. In 1980, Mercier graduated Phi Beta Kappa from the University of California, Berkeley with a BA in Dramatic Art and in 1983 received his MFA at the Yale School of Drama where he was named the Oenslager Scholar.

Starting in 1983, he became a Resident Designer for the O'Neill National Playwrights Conference until 2004 and has been the O'Neill National Theater Institute's design instructor for over 20 years. He is also a Resident Designer for the Vineyard Theater in New York City and Geva Theatre Center in Rochester. He currently works at the University of Washington School of Drama in Seattle as a senior design lecturer.

At the Vineyard Theater, he has received three Drama Desk Nominations for Bed and Sofa (1996) by Polly Pen and Laurence Klavan, Dream True (1999) by Tina Landau and Ricky Ian Gordon, and Head of Passes (2016) by Tarell McCraney. He also received the AUDELCO award for Outstanding Set Design and was regionally honored with the "Bay Area Critics Award" at Berkeley Repertory Theater for Head of Passes (2016).

His first Broadway production was Juan Darien: A Carnival Mass (1997) by Julie Taymor and Elliot Goldenthalat at the Vivian Beaumont where he received a Tony Award Nomination for Scenery and two additional Drama Desk Nominations for Scenic Design and Costume Design.

He has also designed sets for Old Hats (2013) by Bill Irwin and David Shiner, directed by Tina Landau, where he was nominated for the 2013 Henry Hewes Design Award. He has been nominated for the Henry Awards for Outstanding Scenic Award of Denver Theater Center's Measure for Measure directed by Kent Thompson in 2006, awarded the "Bay Area Critics Award" for Best Set Design of William Saroyan's The Time of Your Life (2004) directed by Tina Landau, and has also received a 2001 Jefferson Award Nomination for Best Set Design of Steppenwolf Theatre Company's Ballad of Little Jo (2000) directed by Tina Landau

He was the production designer for feature films Southie (1998) directed by John Shea and Fool's Fire (1992) directed by Julie Taymor, art director of the Amazon children's short Didi Lightful (2012), and assistant art director for the film Big Blonde (1980) directed by Kirk Browning.

He lived in both Seattle, Washington and Rowayton, Connecticut, with his family while continuing to create, collaborate, and educate others about his work as a theatrical designer. He was married to Robert Frazier, and had two children. Mercier died from pancreatic cancer at his home in Rowayton on March 11, 2021, at age 66.

== Selected works ==
- Head of Passes – by Tyrell McCraney; directed by Tina Landau – Set Design, Lucille Lortel & Drama Desk Award Nominations
- Old Hats – by Bill Irwin, David Shiner, Nellie McKay; directed by Tina Landau – Set, costume, & puppet design, Henry Hewes Design Award Nomination
- Dead Man's Cell Phone – by Sarah Ruhl; directed by Anne Bogart – Set and costume design
- Alice in Wonderland – adapted by Sharon Holland; directed by Peter Brosiu – Set and costume design
- Fiddler on the Roof – book by Joseph Stein; directed by Chris Coleman – Set design
- Finding Nemo – book & lyrics by Bobby & Kristen Lopez; directed by Peter Brocius – Set design
- Measure for Measure – by William Shakespeare; directed by Kent Thompson – Henry Award Nomination
- The Time of Your Life – by William Saroyan; directed by Tina Landau – Set design
- The Ballad of Little Jo – book by Sara Slessinger, music by Mike Reid; directed by Tina Landau – Set design, Jefferson Award Nomination
- Dream True – book by Tina Landau, music by Ricky Ian Gordon; directed by Tina Landau – Set and costume design, Drama Desk Award Nomination
- Juan Darien; A Carnival Mass – by Julie Taymor & Eliott Goldenthal; directed by Julie Taymor – Set and costume design, Tony Award Nomination and Drama Desk Award Nomination
- Bed & Sofa directed by Andre Ernotte – Set and Costume Design, Drama Desk Award Nomination
- The Tempest by William Shakespeare; directed by Julie Taymor – Set and Costume Design
