= Karole Armitage =

American dancer and choreographer (born 1954)

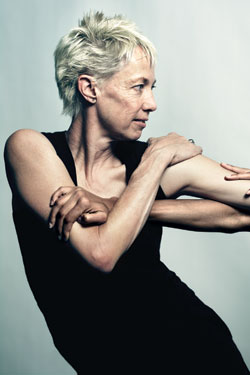
- Born: March 3, 1954 (age 72); Madison, Wisconsin, U.S.
- Occupations: Dancer, choreographer

Karole Armitage (born March 3, 1954) is an American dancer and choreographer based in New York City. She is artistic director of Armitage Gone! Dance, a contemporary dance company that performs in New York City and internationally. Dubbed the “punk ballerina” in the 1980s, she earned a Tony nomination for her choreography of the Broadway musical Hair.

== Early life and early career ==
Born in Madison, Wisconsin, Armitage grew up dividing her time in two places: Gothic, Colorado, and Lawrence, Kansas. Armitage began studying ballet in Lawrence, Kansas at the age of four with former New York City Ballet dancer Tomi Wortham, followed by classes in Crested Butte, Colorado with Shirley Strabhaur. She continued her studies with Ballet West in Aspen and Salt Lake City, at the School of American Ballet, the Harkness House in New York City, at North Carolina School of the Arts, and with Léonide Massine in London.

Armitage began her professional career in 1973 as a member of the Ballet du Grand Théâtre de Genève in Switzerland. The company, directed by George Balanchine and Patricia Neary, was rooted in the Balanchine aesthetic and devoted exclusively to his repertory. There she performed many Balanchine masterworks including Agon, The Four Temperaments and Serenade. In 1975 she became a Swiss citizen and holds dual citizenship with the US. From 1976 to 1981 she was a member of the Merce Cunningham Dance Company performing leading roles across the globe.

In 1978, she created her first piece Ne, followed by Drastic-Classicism in 1981. Throughout the 1980s, Armitage led her own company based in New York City. Her company was known for its collaborations with artists David Salle and Jeff Koons. In 1984, she was invited by Mikhail Baryshnikov to create a work for the American Ballet Theatre. Three years later, Rudolf Nureyev commissioned one of her works for the Paris Opéra Ballet. She created five ballets for the Ballet de l'Opéra National de Paris during the 1980s, leading to commissions in the US and Europe which she pursued throughout the 1990s.

Armitage was named artistic director and choreographer of MaggioDanza (1995–1998) the ballet company at the Opera House in Florence, Italy, where she choreographed, curated and presented classical repertoire, modern masters and contemporary works.

She was named resident choreographer of the Ballet de Lorraine in Nancy, France, in 1999, where she remained until 2002, creating over 20 works for the company.

In 2004, she served as the artistic director of the Venice Biennale International Festival of Contemporary Dance, inviting companies from across the globe to showcase innovative dance throughout the city.

== Armitage GONE! Dance ==
Returning to New York City in 2004, Armitage founded her current company, Armitage Gone! Dance. It is administered by the Armitage Foundation a 501 (c) not- for-profit foundation based in New York City.

Armitage Gone! Dance is based at Mana Contemporary.

== Choreographic style ==
"Karole Armitage is renowned for pushing boundaries to create works that blend dance, music, science, and art to engage in philosophical questions about the search for meaning. Armitage movement looks spontaneous despite its rigorous craftsmanship. Concepts such as “cubism in motion” are applied to group patterns, creating several vantage points so that movement is seen from multiple perspectives, angles, and levels, with planes bleeding into each other. The steps are based on calligraphy and fractal geometry (that of clouds, mountains, seashores), creating a sinuous, curvilinear vocabulary unlike the Euclidian geometry of dance tradition. The dancers share a common purpose but do not dance in unison, producing a funky, democratic individuality with lyricism punctuated by raw, visceral accents."—Harvard Radcliffe Institute

According to her official bio, she is inspired by disparate, non-narrative sources, from 20th century physics, to 16th century Florentine fashion, to pop culture and new media. She has collaborated with contemporary and experimentalist composers such as John Luther Adams, Thomas Adès, Rhys Chatham, Vijay Iyer, and Lukas Ligeti. The sets and costumes for her works are often designed by leading artists in the contemporary art world, including Karen Kilimnik, Jeff Koons, Vera Lutter, David Salle, Phillip Taaffe and Brice Marden. She has also collaborated with fashion designers Christian Lacroix, Jean-Paul Gaultier, and Peter Speliopoulos. Film director James Ivory created sets and costumes for an evening of her choreography that was performed in Italy's historic Teatro della Pergola.

Armitage's choreography can be divided into three distinct, aesthetic periods: punk, picture, and poetry.

=== Punk ===
Armitage joins a long lineage of artists looking at the past at the same time as they seek to dismantle it. Her early work fused Merce Cunningham's aesthetics with an ebullient, joyous, punk-inspired jubilation in destroying the old to bring in the new. The work not only challenged formal notions of dance, but its imagery and content heralded the rise of themes relating to sexuality and gender that became so important in late 20thand early 21st Century discourse. She changed the idea of the ballerina, portraying her as independent thinker with an erotic appetite, rather than as an unobtainable, romantic ideal. In 1980 she put a man in a skirt on the stage as a matter of fact, rather than as drag.

In 1982, Armitage was inspired to examine her roots as a classical ballet dancer after creating three new works for the Paris Opera Ballet at the invitation of Rosella Hightower and Rudolph Nureyev. She combined Balanchine's poetic refinement and brilliant phrase making with Cunningham's use of stage space as a field of action. Her controversial recipe combining the warring factions of ballet and modern dance injected with hard rock energy and the taboo of sexual content, gave dance a much needed shock to its systems with speed, fractured lines, off-balance movement, abstractions and symmetry countermanded by asymmetry and punch.

=== Picture ===
In 1984 Armitage met painter, David Salle, at a post performance dinner that included the choreographer, Yvonne Rainer. The meeting led to the second period in Armitage's aesthetic development as Armitage and Salle began a collaboration that continues to this day. Salle's work, combining figuration with an extremely varied pictorial language, brought dazzlingly original sets and costumes to the stage. The early Armitage/Salle collaborations were made in a free-spirited exploration of style, eras, pluralities and comparatives, embracing the contamination of languages in a mosaic of pattern. The divisions between ballet and modern, high and low, serious and banal disappeared through collage, juxtaposition and humor. Armitage and her dancers performed to spoken text, classical and popular music, jazz, world music and silence. Exploring American identity from the perspective of a culture using everything to sell products, Armitage and Salle's stage work created a contemplative universe awash in color. Though Armitage found consumer culture's influence on the creation of self disturbing, her collaboration with Salle was done, not in the spirit of the social critique, but in the spirit of the artist struggling for form, for the new, for the experimental.

Jeff Koons joined Salle in designing several Armitage productions. The first collaboration in 1988 resulted in Gogo Ballerina for which Koons and Salle shared the costume design while Koons created sets. Armitage worked closely with Koons discussing themes and content for the new work, inspiring the creation of large, interactive sets for the piece. Her dancers used them physically: emerging from a black, heart-shaped chocolate box, dancing on illuminated gogo boxes with red plexiglas bears, hearts, and flowers and breaking apart a large, extravagant cake. The Koons sets were destroyed in the early 2000s when the expense of storage became prohibitive. Salle and Koons worked together again in 1989 on Contempt, Overboard (1991) and The Predators’ Ball/Hucksters of the Soul (1996) where both contributed set and costumes.

=== Poetry ===
In 1995 Armitage was invited to direct the Ballet of Florence, Italy (known as MaggioDanza). The influence of Italian history, politics and aesthetics, living on the streets of Dante and Machiavelli, led to a third, poetic, period in Armitage's artistic thinking. She began to work with a minimum of ingredients to engage in philosophical questions about the search for meaning. Her ideas continued to develop while living in Naples working for the Teatro di San Carlo and in Venice where she directed the Venice International Biennale of Contemporary Dance. Her long collaboration with fashion designer Peter Speliopoulos began in 2000 with The Birds, created for the Greek National Ballet in Athens. He designed over 30 Armitage productions in opera and dance for important theaters in Europe including productions in France when Armitage served as resident choreographer for the Ballet de Lorraine (1999–2004). Their collaboration forms a significant role in the third period of Armitage's work.

Upon her return to New York in 2004, Armitage relaunched Armitage Gone! Dance in a period of intense creativity. To complement her work with visual artists, Armitage began an ongoing collaboration with scientists, drawing upon conceptual ideas around time, space and geometry. In this new phase, Armitage created movement that looks spontaneous and personal, despite it is rigorous craftsmanship. Here dance, light, music, and design are unified into a balanced whole. Concepts such as “cubism in motion” are applied to group patterns creating several vantage points so that movement is seen from multiple perspectives, angles and levels with planes bleeding into each other. The steps themselves are based on calligraphy and fractal geometry (the geometry of nature: clouds, mountains, seashores) creating a sinuous, curvilinear vocabulary unlike the Euclidean geometry of the dance tradition. In her work, the dancers share a common purpose but do not dance in unison. Her spatial design is both elaborate and cohesive, producing a funky, democratic individuality. Extreme lyricism is punctuated by raw, violent accents.

== Music ==
Armitage has choreographed to silence, used text as a score, worked with punk, rock, rap, electronic dance music and commissioned new scores. She searches for music that has a lot of space and silence, allowing the audience to see dance as a primary source of communication. Armitage has also worked with classical music, such as that of composers Béla Bartók (Time is the echo of an axe within a wood, György Ligeti (Ligeti Essays) and, more recently of György's son, Lukas Ligeti. In a conversation with Lukas Ligeti for BOMB Magazine, Armitage described the challenge of choreographing Itutu. Itutu is a dance piece set to both Ligeti's own compositions and those of Burkina Electric, a band based in Burkina Faso. Ligeti works with electronica and Burkinabe popular music in collaboration with the dancer-musicians in the group. Itutu was an opportunity to "make these disparate, contradictory musical worlds mean something theatrical, exploring poly-visual dance and altered states of consciousness."[7]

== Dance Commissions ==
Armitage has created dances for numerous companies including the Paris Opera Ballet, American Ballet Theatre, The Tasmanian Dance Company, Extemporary Dance Company, England, The White Oak Dance Project, the Deutsche Oper Berlin, the Bayerische Staatsoper in Munich, Les Ballets de Monte Carlo, Lyon Opera Ballet, Ballet Nacional de Cuba, The Greek National Ballet, the Washington Ballet, Alvin Ailey American Dance Theater, The Kansas City Ballet, the Bern Ballet, The Washington Ballet, Balletto Teatro di Torino, Rambert Dance Company, Introdans in Holland and the Boston Ballet.

== Dance and Science ==
In 2010 Armitage created the first part of Three Theories inspired by Brian Greene's popular science book The Elegant Universe. This premiered at the World Science Festival (physics of black holes and string theory. [4] Armitage stated that "Physics makes me dream. I try to think outside the box and open up my mind. I like science. Science always questions authority. This conflict between theories seemed to me so dramatic and so incredibly fundamental."[5]

The Armitage GONE! Dance Company, debuted the full-length work version of Three Theories, in 2010 at Champaign-Urbana's Krannert Center for the Performing Arts. The piece, born out of Armitage's desire to embody core principles of physics, presented performing refreshingly virtuosic contemporary ballet choreography.

In March 2015, Armitage collaborated with the Stanford University biologist Paul Ehrlich and 30 dancers to create On The Nature of Things, a work about climate change in the Milstein Hall of Ocean Life at the American Museum of Natural History in New York, the first time the museum hosted a performance season.

== Dance and Theater ==
In the summer of 2010 Armitage worked with the MIT- based composer Tod Machover on his opera titled Death and the Powers. In this opera Armitage incorporated choreography for robots as well as for singers.

Armitage has worked several times at the American Repertory Theater, notably David Adjmi's play Marie Antoinette which was also performed at the Yale Repertory Theater with Armitage choreography

== Dance and Orchestras ==
Armitage choreographed two works for the New York Philharmonic presented at Lincoln Center's Avery Fischer Hall. Both productions were conducted by music director Alan Gilbert. The first, Janáček's The Cunning Little Vixen premiered in 2011. The second, A Dancers Dream, (2013) featured New York City Ballet principal dancers Sara Mearns and Amar Ramasar with Armitage Gone! Dance in choreography to music by Igor Stravinsky.

In 2016 Armitage and Armitage Gone! Dance were commissioned by the London Philharmonia to create Agon with music by Stravinsky, conducted by Esa-Pekka Salonen as part of their Myths and Rituals season.

== Opera Director ==
Armitage has directed operas from the baroque and contemporary repertoire for many of the prestigious houses of Europe. These include the Teatro di San Carlo in Naples, Théâtre du Châtelet in Paris, the Lyric Opera in Athens and Het Muzik Theater in Amsterdam. Her most recent production of Orfeo ed Euridice for the Teatro di San Carlo Opera House in Naples from 2015 was filmed for RAI television and made into a DVD.

In 2007 Armitage directed and choreographed counter tenor Anthony Roth Costanzo's Princeton production of Zefirino - The Voice of a Castrato.

Armitage directed Ariadne Unhinged for the Gotham Chamber Opera in New York and operas for Opera Saratoga including Dido and Aeneas (2015) and Philip Glass's (2016) The Witches of Venice.

== Making Art Dance Exhibition (2015) ==
In 2015 Mana Contemporary presented Making Art Dance, an exhibition that surveyed 35 years of Armitage collaboration with artists and fashion designers in a 25,000 square foot gallery. Costumes, backdrops, sets, and drawings from 1978 to 2015 were nailed to walls, pinned on dress forms and hung from the rafters.

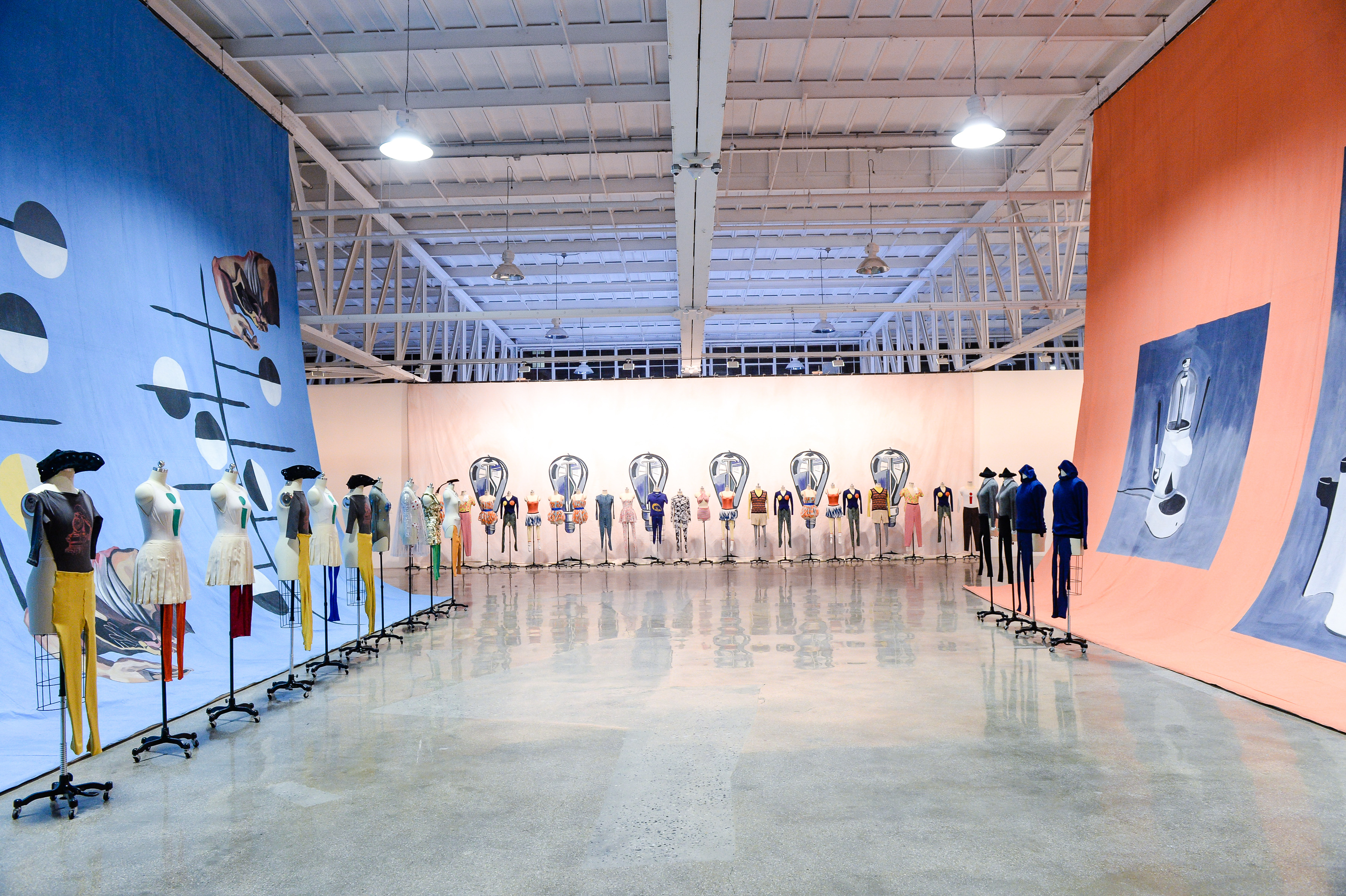
Making Art Dance exhibition at Mana Contemporary

Christian Marclay, while a student at Mass College of Art, created set, costumes and posters for Armitage's first work Ne in 1978. Her subsequent punk pieces were designed by filmmaker, Charles Atlas. Painter, David Salle became her primary collaborator in 1984. Salle created films, costumes, backdrops, sculpture, flats, and props for several incarnations of New York-based Armitage dance companies as well as for European ballet and opera productions. Carroll Dunham created a backdrop for Les Stances a Sophie in 1988. Jeff Koons worked with Armitage from 1987 to 1996 on productions in the US and abroad creating sets and costumes in collaboration with David Salle. Philip Taaffe collaborated on Scheherzade in 1995 and on Itutu in 2008. Brice Marden created backdrops for the Italian production of Orfeo ed Eurdice in 2004 at Teatro di San Carlo in Naples. For Ariadne Unhinged in 2008, Vera Lutter created the set and Donald Baechler designed props. Karen Kilimnik created painted panels based on Domenico Tiepolo's Il Designi Di Pulcinella for Made in Naples in 2009. Armitage collaborators include composers, architects, fashion designers, lighting designers and scientists. Film director, James Ivory created sets and costumes for Armitage in Florence, Italy, as did Jean Paul Gaultier and Christina Lacroix. Peter Speliopoulos, Creative Director of Donna Karan collaborated extensively to create costumes for Armitage productions from the mid-1990s and continues to do so today.

A smaller version of the exhibition was presented at the National Museum of Dance in Saratoga Springs, New York from 2015 to 2016. Several Armitage costumes remain on permanent display.

== Popular culture ==
In addition to working for the stage, Armitage has worked with pop music, including choreography for Michael Jackson's In The Closet and Madonna's Vogue. [6]

In 2012, she choreographed the Cirque du Soleil show Amaluna, a show highlighting the beauty and strength of women, loosely based on Shakespeare's The Tempest, directed by Diane Paulus.[8]

She has also choreographed several movies in collaboration with director James Ivory, including The Golden Bowl and The White Countess. Her work has been the subject of two documentaries made for television: The South Bank Show (1985), directed by David Hinton and Wild Ballerina (1998), directed by Mark Kidel. Her ballet Rave was filmed for television for the European channel Arte.

== Works ==
- Ne (1978) - Armitage Gone! Dance - St. Francis Xavier High School gym. New York, New York
- Do We Could (1979) - Armitage Gone! Dance - The Kitchen. New York, New York
- Vertige(1980) - Armitage Gone! Dance - NYC Club
- It Happened At Club Bombay Cinema - Extemporary Dance Company London, England - London, England
- Drastic-Classicism (1981) - Armitage Gone! Dance - Dance Theater Workshop, New York, New York
- Paradise #1 (1982) - Armitage Gone! Dance - Ukrainian Ballroom, New York, New York
- Slaughter on MacDougal Street (1982) - Group de Recherche de l'Opéra de Paris - Chateauvallon, France
- Parafango (1982) - Armitage Gone! Dance
- The Nutcracker (1982) - Ballet de l'Opéra de Paris - Théâtre de l'Opéra de Paris, Paris, France
- A Real Gone Dance (1982) - Armitage Gone! Dance - La Mama Theater, New York, New York
- Paradise #2 (1983) - Armitage Gone! Dance - Bordeaux, France
- The Last Gone Dance (1983) - Armitage Gone! Dance - Théâtre de la Ville, Paris, France
- GV-10 (1984) - Ballet Théâtre de l'Opéra de Paris - Théâtre de l'Opéra Comique, Paris, France
- Tasmanian Devil (1984) - Tasmanian Dance Company - Tasmania
- The South Bank Show (1985) - Armitage Gone! Dance
- The Mollino Room (1985) - American Ballet Theatre - Kennedy Center, Washington D.C.
- The Watteau Duets (1985) - Armitage Gone! Dance - Maison de la Culture, Grenoble, France
- The Elizabethan Phrasing of the Late Albert Ayler (1986) - Armitage Gone! Dance - Eindhoven, Holland
- Le Stances a Sophie (1987) - Armitage Gone! Dance - Joyce Theater, New York, New York
- The Tarnished Angels (1987) - Ballet de l'Opéra de Paris - Théâtre de l'Opéra de Paris, France
- GoGo Ballerina (1988) - Armitage Gone! Dance - The World, New York, New York
- Kammerdisco (1988) - Armitage Gone! Dance - São Paulo, Brazil
- Duck Dances (1988) - Armitage Gone! Dance - Angers, France
- Without You, I'm Nothing (1989)
- Contempt (1989) - Armitage Gone! Dance - La Quartz, Brest, France
- Various Video Clips (1990)
- World Tour Milli Vanilli (1990)
- Love School (1990)
- Jack and Betty (1990) - Les Nomades - Lausanne, Switzerland
- Dancing Zappa (1990) - Lyon Opera Ballet, Lyon, France
- Forty Guns (1990) - Armitage Gone! Dance - Center for the Arts, Crested Butte, Colorado
- Overboard (1991) - Charleois Dance, Charleois, Belgium
- Renegade Dance Wave (1991) - Armitage Gone! Dance - Center for the Arts, Crested Butte, Colorado
- The Marmot Quickstep (1991) - Armitage Gone! Dance - Center for the Arts, Crested Butte, Colorado
- Chain of Desire (1991)
- World Tour The Dyvinals (1991)
- Blond Ambition World Tour Madonna (1991)
- Vogue (Madonna song) for Madonna (1991)
- Hall of Mirrors (1992)
- Happy Birthday Rossini (1992) - MaggioDanzo di Firenze, Florence, Italy - Teatro della Pergola, Florence, Italy
- In the Closet for Michael Jackson (1992)
- Segunda Piel (1992) - Ballet de Monte Carlo - Monte Carlo, Monaco
- I Had A Dream (1993) - Ballet de Monte Carlo - Monte Carlo, Monaco
- Hucksters of the Soul (1993) - Armitage Gone! Dance - Maison de la Culture, Bobigny, Paris, France
- Search and Destroy (1994)
- The Return of Rasputin (1994)
- The Dog is Us (1994) - Ballet of the Deutsche Oper Berlin - Berlin, Germany
- Tattoo and Tutu (1994) - Ballet of Bayerische stasoper Munich - Statsoper, Munich, Germany
- Hovering at the Edge of Chaos (1994) - Oregon Ballet Theater - Portland, Oregon
- Scheherazade (1995) - MaggioDanza di Firenze - Teatro Comunale, Florence, Italy
- The Predators' Ball/Hucksters of the Soul (1996) - MaggioDanza di Firenze - Brooklyn Academy of Music, New York, New York
- The Predators' Ball (1996) - MaggioDanza di Firenze - Teatro della Pergola, Florence, Italy
- Apollo e Dafne (1997) - MaggioDanza di Firenze - Teatro della Pergola Florence, Italy
- Tersicore (1997) - MaggioDanza di Firenze - Teatro della Pergola, Florence, Italy
- Weather of Reality (1997) - MaggioDanza di Firenze - Teatro Comunale Florence, Italy
- Mirror's Edge (1998) - Ballet de Monte Carlo - Opera de Monte Carlo, Monaco
- Wild Ballerina (1998)
- Nadaswaram (1998) - MaggioDanza di Firenze - Bastia, Corsica France
- Pinocchio (1998) - MaggioDanza di Firenze - Teatro della Pergola, Florence, Italy
- Up At the Villa (1999)
- Life Story (1999) - New York City Ballet - Royal Frestival Hall, London, England
- The Last Lap (1999) - White Oak Project - The New Victory Theater, New York, New York
- The Golden Bowl (2000)
- The Birds (2000) - Greek National Opera Ballet - Irodion Theater, The Acropolis, Athens, Greece
- Yo, Giacomo Casanova (2000) - Armitage Gone! Dance - Teatro Antico, Taormina, Sicily
- Tango Mortale (2000) - Teatro Antico, Toarmina, Sicily
- Concerto Conciso (2000) - Ballet National de Cuba - Teatro Garcia Lorca, Havana, Cuba
- Schrodingers Cat (2000) - Ballet de Lorraine - Théâtre de l'Opéra, Nancy, France
- Technaria (2001) - Armitage Gone! Dance - Joyce Theater, New York, New York
- Drastic Remix (2001) - Ballet de Lorraine - Théâtre de l'Opéra, Nancy, France
- Power Surge (2001) - University of Kansas Dance Department - The Leid Center
- Rave (2001) - Ballet de Lorraine - Théâtre de l'Opéra, Nancy, France
- Melodien (2002) - Ballet de Lorraine - Théâtre de l'Opéra, Nancy, France
- Sonata da Caccia (2002) - Ballet de Lorraine - Mexico
- Pinokkio (2002) - Introdans - Schouwburg Orpheus, Apeldoorn, The Netherlands
- SZ110 (2002) - Ballet de Lorraine - Théâtre de l'Opéra, Nancy, France
- Bluebeard's Castle (2002) - Opéra de Nancy and Ballet de Lorraine - Théâtre de l'Opéra, Nancy, France
- Broken Glass (2002) - Florence Dance Company - Teatro Goldoni, Florence, Italy
- Orfeo ed Euridice (2003) - San Carlo Opera - San Carlo Opera House, Naples, Italy
- Living Toys (2003) - Rambert Dance Company - Glasgow, Scotland
- Time is the echo of an axe within wood (2004) - Armitage Gone! Dance - New York, New York
- The Double Life of Zefirino (2004) - Armitage Gone! Dance - Princeton, New Jersey
- 10 Poems (2004) - ABCDance Company - St. Polten, Austria
- Pigmalion (2004) - Opera House Nancy France and Ballet de Lorraine - Opera de Nancy et de Lorraine, France
- The White Countess (2005)
- Ligeti Essays (Songs) (2005) - Ballet de Lorraine - Centre Malraux Vandoeuvres, France
- In this dream that dogs me (2005) - Armitage Gone! Dance - The Duke on 42nd Street Theater New York, New York
- Cantus Articus (workshop) (2006) - Second Avenue Dance Company - NYU Tisch School of the Arts, New York, New York
- Visual Brainstorming (2006) - Armitage Gone! Dance - The Solomon R. Guggenheim Museum, New York, New York
- Scenes from A Country Bunny (2006)
- Gamelan Gardens (2006) - Alvin Ailey American Dance Theater - New York City Center, New York, New York
- Ligeti Essays (2007) - Armitage Gone! Dance - Joyce Theater New York City
- Gathering his thoughts (2007) - Washington Ballet - Washington D.C.
- Passing Strange (2007) - The Public Theater New York
- Gran Partita (2007) - Rambert Dance Company - Sadler's Wells Theater, London, United Kingdom
- Hair: The American Tribal Love-Rock Musical - The 40th Anniversary Concert Performance (2007) - The Delacorte Theater Central Park, New York, New York
- Passing Strange (2007) - Berkely Repertory Theater - Berkeley, California
- Connoiseurs of Chaos (2008) - Armitage Gone! Dance - Joyce Theater New York City
- Passing Strange (2008) - Belasco Theater New York, New York
- Ariadne Unhinged (2008) - Armitage Gone! Dance - Abrons Arts Center
- Summer of Love (2008) - Armitage Gone! Dance - Damrosch Park, New York, New York
- Between the Clock and the Bed (2008) - Ballet of the Stadttheater Bern - Stadttheater Bern, Switzerland
- Hair: The American Tribal Love-Rock Musical - On Broadway (2009)- Al Hirschfeld Theater, New York, New York
- Mashup (2009) - Armitage Gone! Dance - The Kitchen, New York, New York
- Wild Thing (revival) (2009) - Armitage Gone! Dance - The Kitchen, New York, New York
- The Watteau Duets (revised) (2009) - Armitage Gone! Dance - The Kitchen, New York, New York
- Drastic-Classicism (reviesd) (2009) - Armitage Gone! Dance - The Kitchen, New York, New York
- Arctic Song (2009) - Kansas City Ballet - The Lyric Theater, Kansas City, Mo
- Summer of Love (2009) - Armitage Gone! Dance - Teatro Bellini, Catania, Italy
- Made in Napels (2009) - Armitage Gone! Dance - Teatro San Ferdinando, Napels, Italy
- It's Gonna Get Loud (2009) - The Ririe-Woodbury Dance Company - The Rose Wagner Theater, Salt Lake City, Utah
- The Blue Rider (2009) - Armitage Gone! Dance - The Miller Theater, New York, New York
- Itutu (2009) - Armitage Gone! Dance - Brooklyn Academy of Music, New York, New York
- Brahms on Edge (2010) - The Washington Ballet - The Harmon Center, Washington D.C.
- Three Theories (2010) - Armitage Gone! Dance - Krannert Center for the Performing Arts at the University of Illinois at Urban-Champaing, Illinois
- Fractus (2011) - The Bolshoi Ballet - Orange County Center for the Performing Arts, Costa Mesa, California
- Dancing Exquisite Corpse (2011) - Armitage Gone! Dance - Capitale, New York, New York
- Random Thoughts (2011) - Courtney Henry - Alvin Ailey American Dance Center Theater, New York, New York
- Gaga-Gaku (2011) - Armitage Gone! Dance - The Joyce Theater, New York, New York
- Un-Easy (2011) - Armitage Gone! Dance - SummerStage, New York, New York
- Amaluna (2012) - Cirque du Soleil - Montreal, Canada
- Marie Antoinette (version 1) (2012) - ART Harvard, Cambridge, MA
- Marie Antoinette (version 2) (2012) - Yale Repertory Theater, New Haven, Ct
- Mechanics of the Dance Machine (2013) - Armitage Gone! Dance - New York Live Arts, New York, New York
- A Dancer's Dream (2013) - Sara Means, Amara Ramasar with the New York Philharmonic - Avery Fisher Hall, New York, New York
- Fables on Global Warming (2013) - Armitage Gone! Dance - Krannert Center for the Performing Arts, Urbana, Illinois
- EMV (preview) (2014) - Armitage Gone! Dance - Brooklyn, New York
- Four Seasons - A Spinning Planet (2014) Armitage Gone! Dance - New York City Center, New York
- On The Nature of Things (2015) - Armitage Gone! Dance - The Milstein Hall of Ocean Life, The American Museum of Natural History
- Dido and Aeneas (2015) - Armitage Gone! Dance - The National Museum of Dance open air courtyard, Saratoga Springs, New York
- GoGo Ballerina (Revival) (2016) - Introdans - Municipal Theater of Arnhem, The Netherlands
- Dance Everywhen (2016) - Armitage Gone! Dance - Harvard Art Museums Lobby
- Bitches Brew (2016) - Boston Ballet - Boston Opera House, Boston
- Agon (2016) - Armitage Gone! Dance -Royal Festival Hall, London, United Kingdom
- Summertime (2016) - Armitage Gone! Dance - American Dream Festival, Belvedere di Villa Rufolo, Italy
- Halloween Unleashed: Dancing Bones, Tasting Darkness and the Skeleton Within (2017) - Armitage Gone! Dance - LaMama First Floor Theater
- Walls (2017) - Armitage Gone! Dance - Belvedere di Villa Rufolo
- Donkey Jaw Bone (2018) - Armitage Gone! Dance - New York Live Arts, New York
- Art of the In-Between (2018) - Armitage Gone! Dance - National Sawdust
- You Took A Part of Me (2019) - Armitage Gone! Dance - Japan Society

== Awards and honors ==
Armitage received a 2004 Foundation for Contemporary Arts Grants to Artists Award. In the spring of 2009, Armitage was awarded France's most prestigious award, Commandeur dans L’ordre des Arts et des Lettres.

== Fellowships ==
Radcliffe Fellowship (2016) and Simons Public Humanities Fellowship (2016)

As a Radcliffe Fellow at Harvard University and a Simons Fellow at The University of Kansas, Armitage explored ways to bring the unique point of view of Indigenous cultures into contemporary performance, focusing on the Aboriginal culture of the Kimberley region in Australia and the Kanza, Osage and Pawnee Plains Indian tribes in the United States. Collaborating with thinkers from inside and outside the academy—including from Haskell Indian Nations University—Armitage is continuing research on other ways of being, thinking, and orienting the self on the earth.

MIT Media Lab Directors Fellow (2017–2019) Armitage joins a diverse group of thinkers and inventors, teaching workshops and investigating ideas for how dance and performance can intersect with technology

== See also ==
- Mana Contemporary
