= Ragtime (disambiguation) =

Ragtime is a style of music.

Ragtime may also refer to:

== Arts and entertainment ==
- Ragtime (novel) (1975), by E. L. Doctorow
  - Ragtime (film) (1981), based on the novel
  - Ragtime (musical) (1998), based on the novel
- Ragtime (1927 film), an American silent film directed by Scott Pembroke
- Ragtime (TV series) (1973–1975), a BBC television series for children
- "Ragtime", a song by Brand Nubian from their 1990 album One for All
- Ragtime for Eleven Instruments (1917–18), chamber music, and Ragtime (1921) for piano solo, compositions by Igor Stravinsky
  - Ragtime (I) (1960), second ballet by George Balanchine to Stravinsky's Ragtime for Eleven Instruments
  - Ragtime (II) (1966), third ballet by George Balanchine to Stravinsky's Ragtime for Eleven Instruments

== Other uses ==
- Ragtime (code name), four secret surveillance programs of the NSA
- RagTime, business publishing software
