= Gérard Frémy =

French pianist, composer and percussionist

- Born: Gérard Fernand Marcel Marc Frémy; 12 March 1935 (age 91); Bois-Colombes, France
- Died: 19 January 2014 (aged 78) Haguenau, France
- Genres: Classical music; Contemporary classical music; minimal music
- Occupations: Musician; composer
- Instruments: Piano and keyboard instruments
- Years active: 1950-2014

Gérard Fernand Marcel Marc Frémy (12 March 1935 in Bois-Colombes - 20 January 2014 in Haguenau) was a French pianist and composer.

== Biography ==
A student with Yves Nat at the Conservatoire de Paris, Frémy ended his studies by winning First prize at sixteen.

He was designated by Marcel Dupré and the Association française d'action artistique (Culturesfrance) as a Soviet government scholarship holder. For three years, he studied at the Tchaikovsky Conservatory of Moscow with Heinrich Neuhaus and then rubbed shoulders with Sviatoslav Richter, Emil Gilels, etc. Forty concerts in the USSR and recordings for the state radio punctuated his stay in Russia. He then performed with equal success in most European countries, the United States and Japan, and participated in some of the most important festivals.

He was soloist in ensembles such as Ensemble Ars Nova, Ensemble 2e2m and Musique Vivante, and played as part of Stockhausen's group at Expo '70 in Osaka (1970). His extensive repertoire extended from J.S. Bach to Morton Feldman.

Gérard Frémy was perhaps the closest French performer to John Cage's universe, known, in particular, for his interpretation of the Sonatas and Interludes and Music of Changes. Frémy became an expert at preparing the piano, after performing the Sonatas and Interludes dozens of times, a process which took up to 4 hours when he first started. After the death of Maro Ajemian in 1978, dedicatee of Sonatas and Interludes (which she recorded in 1948), Cage told Frémy that, "There was Maro Ajemian, now there is you."

Remarkably familiar with contemporary creation, Frémy gave many world premieres of some of the most important composers of the time, including Luc Ferrari's Und so weiter (1965), Si le piano était un corps de femme (1966) and Société II (1967); Stockhausen's Pôle pour deux (1970); and the 24 Préludes pour piano from Maurice Ohana (1973). Composer Michèle Bokanowski dedicated Pour un pianiste (1973–1974) to him.

From the mid-1960s and throughout the 1970s, Frémy was an active member of the Groupe d'Etude et Réalisation Musicales (GERM), founded by Pierre Mariétan in 1966, alongside Jean-Yves Bosseur, Michel Amoric, Philippe Drogoz, Bernadette Val, Martin Davorin-Jagodic, Costin Miereanu, Horacio Vaggione, and others. As part of the GERM he recorded Terry Riley's Keyboard Study 2, released on LP on BYG Records in 1970.

In the 1970s, Frémy was romantically involved with composer Éliane Radigue. Radigue's piece Geelriandre (1972) was dedicated to Frémy, and featured him on prepared piano.

Among Frémy's favourite composers were J.S. Bach, Mozart, Schubert, Schumann, Debussy, Ravel, and Cage.

== Teaching ==
An important part of Frémy's career has been devoted to pedagogy, as he taught in the Music Department of the Université Paris-VIII-Vincennes (alongside Daniel Charles, Éveline Andréani, Daniel Caux and Costin Miereanu) from the late 1960s to the mid-1970s. He then taught piano and chamber music classes at the Conservatoire National de région de Strasbourg from 1975 to 1985 and later at the Conservatoire de Paris.

Among his pupils were Cédric Tiberghien, Jérôme Ducros, Nicolas Horvath, Cândido Lima, Dimitri Vassilakis, Nicolas Stavy, Klaus Steffes-Hollände, Sodi Braide, Stéphane Seban, and Bernard Geyer.

== Selected compositions ==
- Fantaisie pour violon et piano (1956)
- Duo
- Autobiophonie (1973)
- Eine kleine Freundschaftmusik (1974)
- Easyroad (1990)
