= Orpheus (ballet) =

1947 neoclassical ballet by Igor Stravinsky

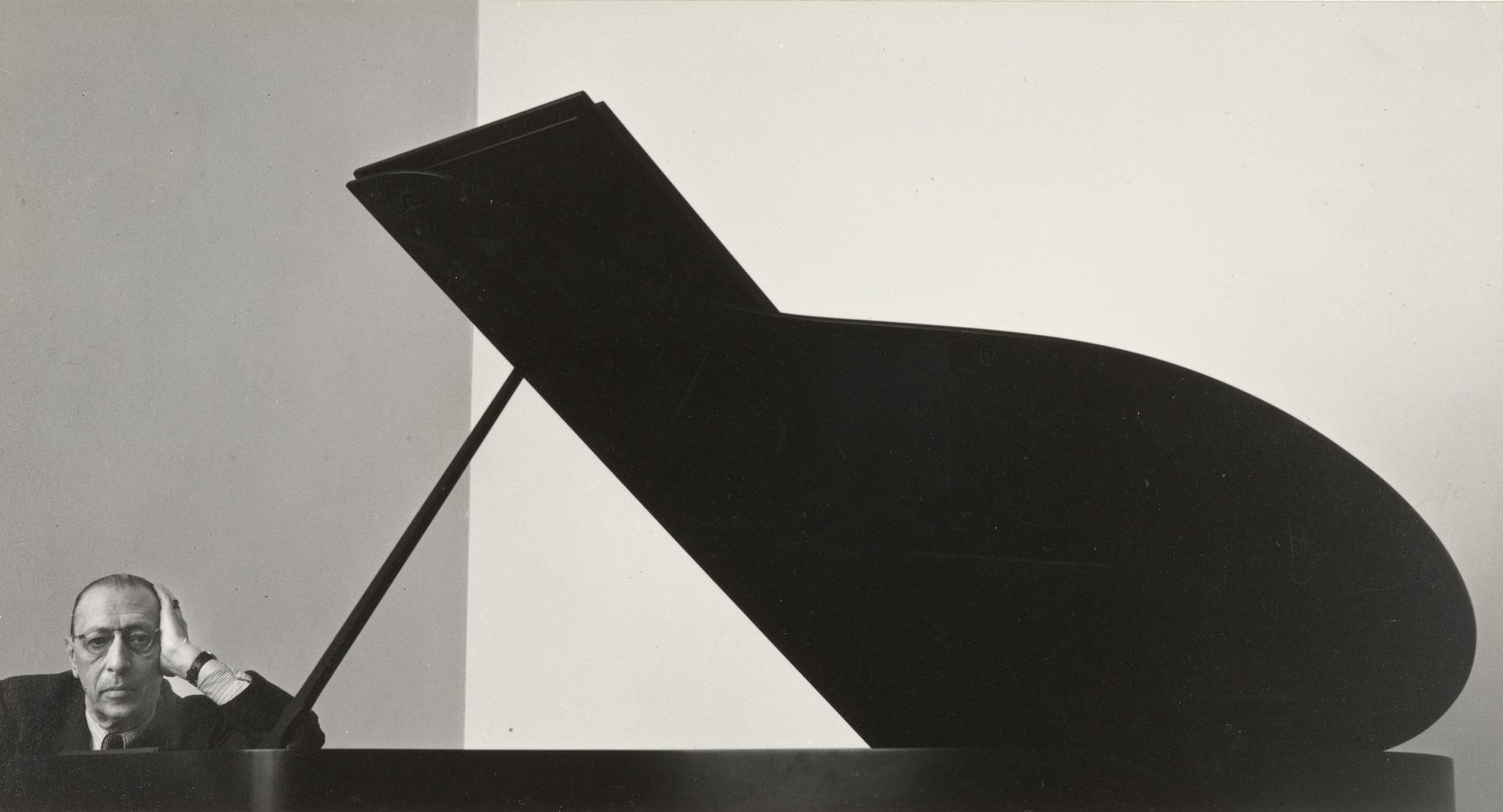
- Photograph of Stravinsky by Arnold Newman
- Choreographer: George Balanchine
- Music: Igor Stravinsky
- Premiere: 28 April 1948; City Center of Music and Drama, New York
- Original ballet company: Ballet Society
- Characters: Orpheus, Dark Angel, Eurydice, Leader of the Furies, Leader of the Bacchantes, Apollo, Pluto, Satyr, Nature Spirits, Friends to Orpheus, Furies, Lost Souls, Bacchantes
- Design: Isamu Noguchi, Jean Rosenthal
- Genre: Neoclassical ballet
- Type: Classical ballet

Orpheus is a thirty-minute neoclassical ballet in three tableaux composed by Igor Stravinsky in collaboration with choreographer George Balanchine in Hollywood, California in 1947. The work was commissioned by the Ballet Society, which Balanchine founded together with Lincoln Kirstein and of which he was Artistic Director. Sets and costumes were created by Isamu Noguchi.

== Structure ==
The original cast consisted of 30 dancers: Orpheus; Eurydice; the Dark Angel of Death; Apollo; the leader of the Furies; the leader of the Bacchantes; eight women Bacchantes; nine women in various roles (Friends to Orpheus, Furies, Pluto, Satyr, and Nature Spirits); and seven men as Lost Souls.

The action is divided into three tableaux and twelve dance episodes: (I. Tableau): Orpheus Weeps for Eurydice; Air de Danse; Dance of the Angel of Death; Interlude. (II. Tableau): Pas des furies; Air de danse (Orphée)/Interlude/Air de danse, conclusion; Pas d’action; Pas de deux; Interlude; Pas d’action. (III. Tableau): Apothéose d'Orphée.

== Score ==
The score is among Stravinsky's most melodious. There is a wide dynamic range (reaching fortississimo, fff, at the moment when the Bacchantes seize and dismember Orpheus); but mostly the orchestra plays quietly, seldom rising above mezzoforte.

The size of the orchestra is very much "neo-classical"; like Beethoven, Stravinsky has scored for pairs of woodwinds (except that, like Beethoven in his 5th and 6th symphonies, he has added a piccolo to the two flutes). This economy in the scoring is, like the quiet dynamics that predominate in Orpheus, in stark contrast to the composer's The Rite of Spring of 35 years before. Beethoven deployed three trombones in his 5th and 9th Symphonies, importing them from the world of operatic music; the use of three trombones then became the normal orchestral practice in the 19th century and up through the present day, but in Orpheus Stravinsky calls for only two. The tuba is omitted entirely. Also strikingly different from The Rite of Spring is the absence of a percussion section and the use of only one timpanist.

There is an important role for the harp in Orpheus. This has a long tradition in classical music, in which the character of Orpheus is associated with that instrument, by analogy with the Ancient Greek lyre. Two important examples of this may be mentioned: Gluck’s opera Orfeo ed Euridice and Liszt’s symphonic poem Orpheus.

Stravinsky's neoclassicism occasionally extends to parody; one of the most extended examples in his work is to be found in the Air de Danse (Orphée) of the second tableau, in which an elegant "Siciliana" for reduced forces of harp, timpani, strings, and oboe duet (with cor anglais replacing one of the oboes after the interlude) evokes the slow movement of a late Baroque concerto. Stravinsky also creates a neo-Baroque parody—for a scene that also takes place in Hades—in his Perséphone of 1934.

== History ==
The premiere took place on April 28, 1948, at City Center of Music and Drama, New York, and directly resulted in City Center's chairman, Morton Baum, inviting Balanchine and Kirstein to establish a resident company. The new company was named (or Ballet Society renamed) New York City Ballet and Balanchine remained its ballet master until his death.

The program for City Ballet's first performance at City Center, conducted by the composer, consisted of Orpheus, Concerto Barocco and Symphony in C on October 11, 1948.

Noguchi's rendition of Orpheus' lyre was adopted as – and remains – City Ballet's official symbol.

== Casts ==
=== Original ===
- Maria Tallchief - Eurydice
- Beatrice Tompkins - Leader of the Furies
- Tanaquil LeClercq - Leader of the Bacchantes
- Nicholas Magallanes - Orpheus
- Francisco Moncion - The Dark Angel
- Herbert Bliss - Apollo

...plus eight women Bacchantes, nine women in various roles (Furies, Pluto, Satyr, Nature Spirits, Friends to Orpheus), and seven men as Lost Souls.

== Reviews ==
- NY Times by John Martin, April 29, 1948

== Articles ==
- Sunday NY Times by John Martin, May 16, 1948
- NY Times by John Martin, January 17, 1949
