= The Seasons (Cage) =

- Choreographer: Merce Cunningham
- Music: John Cage
- Premiere: 17 May 1947; Ziegfeld Theater, New York, NY
- Original ballet company: Ballet Society
- Design: Isamu Noguchi

The Seasons is a ballet with music by John Cage and choreography by Merce Cunningham, first performed in 1947. It was Cage's first piece for orchestra and also the first to use what Cage later called the gamut technique, albeit in an early form.

== Overview ==
Cage composed the music in early 1947, in the midst of working on Sonatas and Interludes. A piano version was first completed, and an orchestral arrangement followed. Cage dedicated The Seasons to Lincoln Kirstein. The ballet was premiered on May 17, 1947 by the Ballet Society (by which the work was commissioned) at the Ziegfeld Theatre in New York City, with original choreography by Merce Cunningham (now lost). Costumes and scenery were designed by Isamu Noguchi. The dancers at the first performance were Gisela Caccialanza, Fred Danieli, Dorothy Dushock, Gerard Leavitt, Tanaquil LeClercq, Job Sanders, Beatrice Tompkins and Cunningham himself.

The ballet is in one act divided into nine sections: Prelude I, Winter; Prelude II, Spring; Prelude III, Summer; Prelude IV, Fall; Finale (Prelude I). As in Sonatas and Interludes and the later String Quartet in Four Parts (1950), Cage was influenced by Indian aesthetics and like the latter work, The Seasons is built on the Indian concept of seasons: winter is associated with quiescence, spring with creation, summer with preservation and fall with destruction. The Finale is a reprise of the first Prelude, symbolizing the cyclical nature of seasons.

As in the majority of Cage's compositions from the 1940s, the music of The Seasons is based on a predefined proportion. In this case the proportion is 2, 2, 1, 3, 2, 4, 1, 3, 1, and it governs not only the construction of individual movements, but also the proportions of the entire work, roughly defining the relative lengths of the movements. The compositional technique involves using gamuts of sounds, i.e. predefined sonorities (single notes, chords, aggregates); Cage started developing this approach in The Seasons, and later perfected it in String Quartet in Four Parts and Concerto for Prepared Piano.

== See also ==
- List of ballets by title
