= Nicholas Efimov =

Nicholas Efimov was a Soviet Ballet dancer who trained at the Theater School in St. Petersburg and the Maryinsky Ballet. During a 1924 tour in Western Europe, Efimov defected along with dancers Alexandra Danilova, choreographer George Balanchine and his wife. He fled to France where he danced with the Ballets Russes and subsequently became a premier dancer with the Paris Opera Ballet.

== See also ==
- List of Russian ballet dancers
- Soviet Ballet
