= Ragtime (I) =

1960 ballet by George Balanchine

Ragtime (I) is the second of three ballets made by New York City Ballet's co-founder and balletmaster George Balanchine to Igor Stravinsky's 1918 Ragtime for Eleven Instruments; with scenery by Robert Drew previously used for Lew Christensen's 1947 work for Ballet Society, Blackface; costumes by Karinska and lighting by David Hays. The premiere took place on December 7, 1960, at City Center of Music and Drama, conducted by Robert Irving, as part of a quartet of works titled Jazz Concert, together with dances by Todd Bolender's Creation of the World, Francisco Moncion's Les biches and John Taras' Ebony Concerto. Balanchine's 1966 Ragtime (II) was also made for City Ballet; his previous ballet to Stravinsky's Ragtime was one of a number of "informal little things" made in St. Petersburg in 1922.

== Original cast ==
- Diana Adams
- Bill Carter
