= Arthur Richman (playwright) =

American playwright

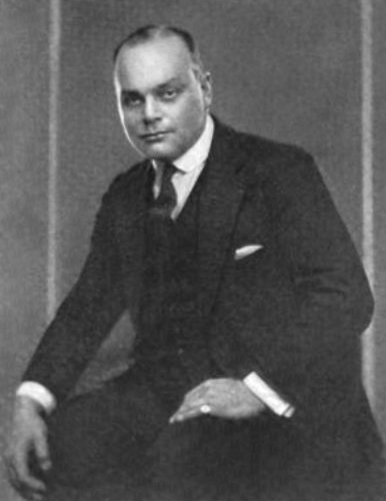
- Born: Arthur Reichman; April 16, 1886; New York City, US
- Died: September 10, 1944 (aged 58); New York City, US
- Occupations: Playwright, screenwriter
- Spouse: Madeleine Marshall (m. 1925; div. 1929)

Arthur Richman (née Reichman; April 16, 1886 – September 10, 1944) was a playwright in the United States. Some of his plays were adapted to film.

== Biography ==
Arthur Reichman was born in New York City on April 16, 1886, to parents William and Janice (Jenny).

During World War I, he served as a lieutenant in the Chemical Warfare Service.

In 1933, he wrote to George Cukor praising the film Little Women.

He married Madeleine Marshall in London on July 18, 1925. She appeared in his play Ambush. In 1928 his wife sought a divorce from him.

He served as president of the Dramatists Guild of America in 1924.

John M. Richman who headed Kraft Foods was his son.

Arthur Richman died from a heart attack at Lenox Hill Hospital in Manhattan on September 10, 1944.

== Theater ==
- Not So Long Ago (1920)
- Ambush (1922)
- A Serpent's Tooth (1922)
- The Far Cry (1924)
- The Awful Truth (1922)
- All Dressed Up (1925)
- Not So Long Ago
- Antonia
- Mayflowers
- A Proud Woman
- Heavy Traffic
- The Seasons Change

== Film ==
- The Awful Truth (1925)
- Not So Long Ago (1925)
- The Awful Truth (1937)
