= String Quartet in Four Parts =

String Quartet in Four Parts is a string quartet by John Cage, composed in 1950. It is one of the last works Cage wrote that is not entirely indeterminate. Like Sonatas and Interludes for prepared piano (1946–48) and the ballet The Seasons (1947), this work explores ideas from Indian philosophy.

== History and structure ==
Cage began writing the quartet in 1949 in Paris. Prior to beginning to work on the piece, he told his parents that he wanted to compose a work which would praise silence without actually using it; after completing the first movement he was so fascinated with the new way to work that he wrote in a letter: "This piece is like the opening of another door; the possibilities implied are unlimited." The piece was completed in 1950 in New York City and dedicated to Lou Harrison. It was premièred on August 12 the same year at the Black Mountain College.

The String Quartet in Four Parts is based partly on the Indian view of the seasons, in which the four seasons—spring, summer, autumn and winter—are associated each with a particular force–those of creation, preservation, destruction and quiescence. The parts and their corresponding seasons are as follows:

1. Quietly Flowing Along – Summer
2. Slowly Rocking – Autumn
3. Nearly Stationary – Winter
4. Quodlibet – Spring

The general quietness and flatness of sound in the quartet may be an expression of tranquility, the uniting emotion of the nine permanent emotions of the Rasa aesthetic, which Cage explored earlier in Sonatas and Interludes for prepared piano. Another aspect of composition which Cage used earlier was the use of counterpoint: the third movement uses a canon for a single melodic line, which repeats itself going backward, in a slightly rhythmically altered form, to the beginning. Cage composed canons from his earliest works, such as the Three Easy Pieces of 1933 and Solo with obbligato accompaniment of two voices in canon of 1934.

To compose the quartet, Cage used a new technique which consisted of dealing with fixed sonorities, or chords. He called those 'gamuts', and each gamut was created independently of all others. After producing a fixed amount of gamuts, scored for each player in an unchanging way, a succession of them could be used to create a melody with harmonic background. Because at any particular point a gamut would be selected only for containing the note necessary for the melody, the resulting harmony would serve no purpose and any sense of progression, which was alien to Cage, would be eliminated. Since 1946 Cage's interest was in composing music to "sober and quiet the mind, thus rendering it susceptible to divine influences", rather than music to express feelings and ideas, and he would later give up control over music altogether by using chance operations, but already in the String Quartet in Four Parts "the inclusion of traditional harmonies was a matter of taste, from which a conscious control was absent."

This composition and a lost early string quartet from 1936 are the only quartets Cage wrote that were explicitly labelled as such. Only three more works were composed for the same ensemble: Thirty pieces for String Quartet of 1983, Music for Four of 1987–88 and Four of 1989. Many of Cage's indeterminate works, such as the Variations series, Fontana Mix, as well as the string parts for Concert For Piano And Orchestra and others can be performed by a string quartet as well. Additionally, Cage's 44 Harmonies have been arranged for string quartet by Irvine Arditti.

== Editions ==
- Edition Peters 6757. 1960 by Henmar Press.

== See also ==
- List of compositions by John Cage

== Notes ==
=== Sources ===
- Cage, John (1973) [1961]. Silence: Lectures and Writings. Wesleyan Paperback. ISBN 0-8195-6028-6.
- Kostelanetz, Richard (2003). Conversing with John Cage. Routledge. ISBN 0-415-93792-2.
- Pritchett, James; Kuhn, Laura; Hiroshi Garrett, Charles (2012). "Cage, John (Milton, Jr.)". Grove Music Online (8th ed.). Oxford University Press. doi:10.1093/gmo/9781561592630.article.A2223954. ISBN 978-1-56159-263-0.
