= Sonatas and Interludes =

Musical works by John Cage

Piano prepared for a performance of Sonatas and Interludes

Sonatas and Interludes is a cycle of twenty pieces for prepared piano by American avant-garde composer John Cage (1912–1992). It was composed in 1946–48, shortly after Cage's introduction to Indian philosophy and the teachings of art historian Ananda K. Coomaraswamy, both of which became major influences on the composer's later work. Significantly more complex than his other works for prepared piano, Sonatas and Interludes is generally recognized as one of Cage's finest achievements.

The cycle consists of sixteen sonatas (thirteen of which are cast in binary form, the remaining three in ternary form) and four more freely structured interludes. The aim of the pieces is to express the eight permanent emotions of the rasa Indian tradition. In Sonatas and Interludes, Cage elevated his technique of rhythmic proportions to a new level of complexity. In each sonata a short sequence of natural numbers and fractions defines the structure of the work and that of its parts, informing structures as localized as individual melodic lines.

== History of composition ==
Cage underwent an artistic crisis in the early 1940s. His compositions were rarely accepted by the public, and he grew more and more disillusioned with the idea of art as communication. He later gave an account of the reasons: "Frequently I misunderstood what another composer was saying simply because I had little understanding of his language. And I found other people misunderstanding what I myself was saying when I was saying something pointed and direct". At the beginning of 1946, Cage met Gita Sarabhai, an Indian musician who came to the United States concerned about Western influence on the music of her country. Sarabhai wanted to spend several months in the US, studying Western music. She took lessons in counterpoint and contemporary music with Cage, who offered to teach her for free if she taught him about Indian music in return. Sarabhai agreed and through her Cage became acquainted with Indian music and philosophy. The purpose of music, according to Sarabhai's teacher in India, was "to sober and quiet the mind, thus rendering it susceptible to divine influences".

Short excerpt from Sonata II ...
... which is clearly inspired by Eastern music

Sonata XVI

At around the same time, Cage began studying the writings of the Indian art historian Ananda K. Coomaraswamy. Among the ideas that influenced Cage was the description of the rasa aesthetic and of its eight "permanent emotions". These emotions are divided into two groups: four white (humor, wonder, erotic, and heroic—"accepting one's experience", in Cage's words) and four black (anger, fear, disgust, and sorrow). They are the first eight of the navarasas or navrasas ("nine emotions"), and they have a common tendency towards the ninth of the navarasas: tranquility. Cage never specified which of the pieces relate to which emotions, or whether there even exists such direct correspondence between them. He mentioned, though, that the "pieces with bell-like sounds suggest Europe and others with a drum-like resonance suggest the East". Cage also stated that Sonata XVI, the last of the cycle, is "clearly European. It was the signature of a composer from the West."

Cage started working on the cycle in February 1946, while living in New York City. The idea of a collection of short pieces was apparently prompted by the poet Edwin Denby, who had remarked that short pieces "can have in them just as much as long pieces can". The choice of materials and the technique of piano preparation in Sonatas and Interludes were largely dependent on improvisation: Cage later wrote that the cycle was composed "by playing the piano, listening to differences [and] making a choice". On several accounts he offered a poetic metaphor for this process, comparing it with collecting shells while walking along a beach. In early 1947, Cage composed The Seasons, a ballet in nine sections also inspired by ideas from Indian philosophy.

Cage completed Sonatas and Interludes in 1948 and dedicated it to Maro Ajemian, a pianist and friend. Ajemian performed the work many times since 1949, including one of the first performances of the complete cycle on January 12, 1949, in Carnegie Hall. On many other occasions in the late 1940s and early 1950s, Cage performed it himself. Critical reaction was uneven, but mostly positive, and the success of Sonatas and Interludes led to a grant from the Guggenheim Foundation, which Cage received in 1949, allowing him to make a six-month trip to Europe. There he met Olivier Messiaen, who helped organize a performance of the work for his students in Paris on June 7, 1949; and he befriended Pierre Boulez, who became an early admirer of the work and wrote a lecture about it for the June 17, 1949 performance at the salon of Suzanne Tézenas in Paris. While in Europe, Cage began writing String Quartet in Four Parts, yet another work influenced by Indian philosophy.

== Analysis ==
=== Piano preparation ===
Part of the table of preparations of Sonatas and Interludes

In the text accompanying the first recording of Sonatas and Interludes, Cage specifically stated that the use of preparations is not a criticism of the instrument, but a simple practical measure. Cage began composing for prepared piano in 1940, when he wrote a piece called Bacchanale for a dance by Syvilla Fort, and by 1946 had already composed a large number of works for the instrument. However, in Sonatas and Interludes the preparation is very complex, more so than in any of the earlier pieces. Forty-five notes are prepared, mostly using screws and various types of bolts, but also with fifteen pieces of rubber, four pieces of plastic, several nuts and one eraser. It takes about two or three hours to prepare a piano for performance. Despite the detailed instructions, any preparation is bound to be different from any other, and Cage himself suggested that there is no strict plan to adhere to: "if you enjoy playing the Sonatas and Interludes then do it so that it seems right to you".

For the most part Cage avoids using lower registers of the piano, and much of the music's melodic foreground lies in the soprano range. Of the forty-five prepared notes, only three belong to the three lowest octaves below F♯_{3}: D_{3}, D_{2} and D_{1}. Furthermore, D_{2} is prepared in such a way that the resulting sound has the frequency of a D_{4} (resulting in two variants of D_{4} available, one more prepared than the other). The portion of the keyboard above F♯_{3} is divided into roughly three registers: low, middle, and high. The low register has the heaviest preparation, and the high register the lightest. Different methods are used: certain notes produce sounds that retain the original frequency and a pianistic character; others become drum-like sounds, detuned versions of the original notes, or metallic, rattling sounds that have no sense of the fundamental frequency at all. The use of the soft pedal, which makes the hammers strike only two of the three strings of each note (or one, for notes with only two strings), complicates the matter further. For example, the note C_{5} is a metallic sound with no fundamental discernible when the soft pedal is depressed, but it sounds fairly normal if the pedal is released. It appears that Cage was fully aware of the implications of this: certain sonatas feature interplay between two versions of one note, others place special emphasis on particular notes, and still others are very dependent on particular note combinations.

The definitive recording by Maro Ajemian, supervised by the composer

The first five bars of Sonata XV in Cage's calligraphic notation. All three major groups of sounds used in Sonatas and Interludes are present: the heavily prepared notes with no fundamental frequency discernible (for instance, D_{6}), lightly prepared notes (G♭_{4}), and non-prepared notes (G_{5}). The soft pedal is depressed throughout—otherwise some of the sounds would be different.

=== Structure ===
The cycle comprises sixteen sonatas and four interludes, arranged symmetrically. Four groups of four sonatas each are separated by interludes in the following way:

Sonatas I–IV – Interlude 1 – Sonatas V–VIII
Interludes 2, 3
Sonatas IX–XII – Interlude 4 – Sonatas XIII–XVI

Cage refers to his pieces as sonata in the sense that these works are cast in the form that early classical keyboard sonatas (such as those of Scarlatti) were: AABB. The works are not cast in the later sonata form which is far more elaborate. The only exceptions are sonatas IX–XI, which feature three sections: prelude, interlude, and postlude. Sonatas XIV–XV follow the AABB scheme but are paired and given the joint title Gemini—after the work of Richard Lippold, referring to a sculpture by Lippold. The interludes, on the other hand, do not have a unifying scheme. The first two are free-form movements, whereas interludes 3 and 4 have a four-section structure with repeats for each section.

Forms and structural proportions in Sonatas and Interludes
Piece	Form	Proportions	Unit size (bars)
Sonata I	AABB	1 1/4, 3/4, 1 1/4, 3/4, 1 1/2, 1 1/2	7
Sonata II	AABB	1 1/2, 1 1/2, 2 3/8, 2 3/8	7 3/4
Sonata III	AABB	1, 1, 3 1/4, 3 1/4	8 1/2
Sonata IV	AABB	3, 3, 2, 2	10
Interlude 1	N/A (no repeats)	1 1/2, 1 1/2, 2, 1 1/2, 1 1/2, 2	10
Sonata V	AABB	2, 2, 2 1/2, 2 1/2	9
Sonata VI	AABB	2 2/3, 2 2/3, 1/3, 1/3	6
Sonata VII	AABB	2, 2, 1, 1	6
Sonata VIII	AABB	2, 2, 1 1/2, 1 1/2	7
Interlude 2	N/A (no repeats)	N/A (unclear)	8
Interlude 3	AABBCCDD	1 1/4, 1 1/4, 1, 1, 3/4, 3/4, 1/2, 1/2	7
Sonata IX	ABBCC	1, 2, 2, 1 1/2, 1 1/2	8
Sonata X	AABBC	1, 1, 1, 1, 2	6
Sonata XI	AABCC	2, 2, 3, 1 1/2, 1 1/2	10
Sonata XII	AABB	2, 2, 2 1/2, 2 1/2	9
Interlude 4	AABBCCDD	1, 1, 1, 1, 1, 1, 1 1/4, 1 1/4	8 1/2
Sonata XIII	AABB	1 1/2, 1 1/2, 3 1/2, 3 1/2	10
Sonata XIV	AABB	2, 2, 3, 3	10
Sonata XV	AABB	2, 2, 3, 3	10
Sonata XVI	AABB	3 1/2, 3 1/2, 1 1/2, 1 1/2	10

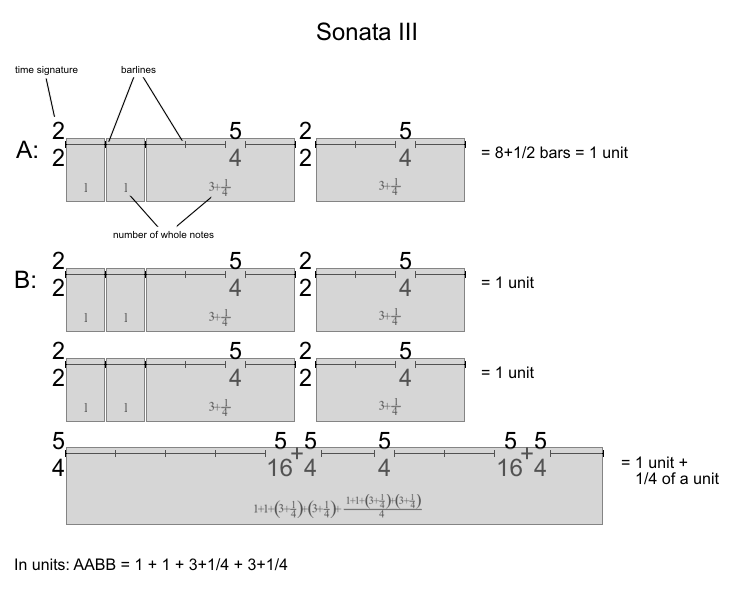
Rhythmic proportions in Sonata III

The main technique Cage used for composition is that of nested proportions: an arbitrary sequence of numbers defines the structure of a piece on both the macroscopic and the microscopic level, so that the larger parts of each piece are in the same relation to the whole as the smaller parts are to a single unit of it. For instance, the proportion for Sonata III is 1, 1, 3 1/4, 3 1/4 (in whole notes), and a unit here is equal to 8 1/2 bars (the end of a unit is marked with a double barline in the score, unless it coincides with the end of a section). The structure of this sonata is AABB. Section A consists of a single unit, composed according to the given proportion: correlation on the microscopic level. A is repeated, and AA forms the first part of the proportion on the macroscopic level: 1, 1. B consists of three units and an appendix of 1/4 of a unit. B is also repeated, and BB gives the second half of the proportion: 3 1/4, 3 1/4. Therefore, AABB has proportions 1, 1, 3 1/4, 3 1/4: correlation on the macroscopic level. The musical phrases within each unit are also governed by the same proportion.

The proportions were chosen arbitrarily in all but the last four pieces in the cycle: sonatas XIII and XVI use symmetrical proportions, and sonatas XIV and XV share the 2, 2, 3, 3 proportion. This symmetry, and the adherence of all four sonatas to the ten-bar unit, were explained by Cage as an expression of tranquility. The complexity of proportions prompted Cage to use asymmetric musical phrases and somewhat frequent changes of time signature to achieve both microscopic and macroscopic correlation. For example, unit length of 8 1/2 in the first section of Sonata III is achieved by using six bars in 2/2 time and two in 5/4 (rather than eight bars in 2/2 and one in 1/2). In many sonatas the microstructure—how the melodic lines are constructed—deviates slightly from the pre-defined proportion.

Cage had frequently used the nested proportions technique and its variations before, most notably in First Construction (in Metal) (1939), which was the first piece to use it, and numerous dance-related works for prepared piano. In Sonatas and Interludes, however, the proportions are more complex, partly because fractions are used. In his 1949 lecture on Sonatas and Interludes Pierre Boulez specifically emphasized the connection between tradition and innovation in Sonatas and Interludes: "The structure of these sonatas brings together a pre-Classical structure and a rhythmic structure which belong to two entirely different worlds."

=== Reception ===
Cage's biographers James Pritchett and Laura Kuhn think "Sonatas and Interludes is a truly exceptional work and may be said to mark the real start of Cage's mature compositional life." David Nicholls writes, "Most critics agree that Sonatas and Interludes (1946–48) is the finest composition of Cage's early period."

== Recordings ==
Sonatas and Interludes has been recorded many times, both in its complete form and in parts. This list is organized chronologically and presents only the complete recordings. Years of recording are given, not years of release. Catalogue numbers are indicated for the latest available CD versions. For the complete discography with reissues and partial recordings listed, see the link to the John Cage database below.

- Maro Ajemian – 1951, Dial Records 20–21. Reissued in the 1960s, Composers Recordings Inc. CRI 700. Reissued on CD, él records ACMEM88CD
- Yūji Takahashi:
  - 1965, Fylkingen Records FYCD 1010 (mono)
  - 1975, Denon COCO 70757 (stereo, digital)
- John Damgaard – 1971, Membran Quadromania 222190-444 (4CD, incl. many other works)
- John Tilbury – 1974, Explore Records EXP0004
- Joshua Pierce:
  - 1975, Wergo WER 60156-50
  - 1988, Newport Classic NPD 85526
  - 1999, Ants Records AG 06 (2CD, live recording)
  - 2000, SoLyd Records SLR 0303 (live recording)
- Gérard Frémy – 1980, Pianovox PIA 521–2, Ogam Records 488004-2, Etcetera Records KTC 2001
- Nada Kolundžija – c. 1981, Diskos LPD-930 (2LP)
- Darryl Rosenberg – c. 1986, VQR Digital VQR 2001 (LP)
- Mario Bertoncini – 1991, released 2001 as Edition RZ 20001 (Parallele 20001)
- Nigel Butterley – 1992, Tall Poppies TP025
- Louis Goldstein – 1994, Greensye Music 4794 (incl. Dream)
- Philipp Vandré – 1994, Mode 50 (according to the liner notes, this is the first recording made on a Steinway "O"-type baby grand piano, the model Cage originally composed the piece on)
- Julie Steinberg – 1995, Music & Arts 937
- Markus Hinterhäuser – 1996, Col Legno WWE 1CD 20001
- Steffen Schleiermacher – 1996, MDG 613 0781-2 (3CD, part of John Cage: Complete Piano Works 18CD series)
- Aleck Karis – 1997, Bridge 9081 A/B (2CD, incl. Cage's lecture Composition in Retrospect)
- Jean Pierre Dupuy – 1997, Stradivarius 33422
- Boris Berman – 1998, Naxos 8.559042 or Naxos 8.554345
- Joanna MacGregor – 1998, SoundCircus SC 003 (2CD, includes miscellaneous other works by Cage and other composers)
- Giancarlo Cardini – 1999, Materiali Sonori
- Kumi Wakao – 1999, Mesostics MESCD-0011
- Herbert Henck – 2000, ECM New Series 1842 (2CD, incl. Henck's Festeburger Fantasien)
- Tim Ovens – c. 2002, CordAria CACD 566 (incl. a multimedia CD)
- Margaret Leng Tan – 2003, Mode 158 (CD and DVD, incl. many other works and several documentaries)
- Nora Skuta – 2004, Hevhetia Records HV 0011-2-131 (SACD)
- Giancarlo Simonacci – 2005, Brilliant Classics 8189 (3CD, part of Complete Music for Prepared Piano)
- Antonis Anissegos – 2014, WERGO (WER 67822)
- Kate Boyd – 2014, Navona Records (NV5984) (CD, also includes Cage's In a Landscape)

== See also ==
- List of compositions by John Cage
- Works for prepared piano by John Cage
- String Quartet in Four Parts
- The Seasons
- Makrokosmos, several collections of works for prepared piano or played using extended technique (or both), by George Crumb

== Notes ==
=== Sources ===
- Cage, John (1973) [1961]. Silence: Lectures and Writings. Wesleyan Paperback. ISBN 0-8195-6028-6.
- Kostelanetz, Richard (2003). Conversing with John Cage. Routledge. ISBN 0-415-93792-2.
- Nicholls, David (2002). The Cambridge Companion to John Cage. Cambridge Companions to Music. Cambridge University Press. ISBN 0-521-78968-0.
- Perry, Jeffrey (Spring 2005). "Cage's Sonatas and Interludes for prepared piano: performance, hearing and analysis". Music Theory Spectrum. 27 (1): 35–66. doi:10.1525/mts.2005.27.1.35.
- Pritchett, James (1993). The Music of John Cage. Cambridge University Press. ISBN 0-521-56544-8.
- Pritchett, James; Kuhn, Laura (2001). "John Cage". In Sadie, Stanley; Tyrrell, John (eds.). The New Grove Dictionary of Music and Musicians (2nd ed.). London: Macmillan. ISBN 978-1-56159-239-5.
