= Ballet Society =

Non-profit educational institution

- Founders: Lincoln Kirstein; George Balanchine
- Established: 1946
- President: Nancy Lassalle
- Location: New York City
- Website: ballet-society.com

Ballet Society is a non-profit educational institution founded in 1946 by Lincoln Kirstein and George Balanchine. At its founding, Balanchine was the artistic director and Kirstein served as the Secretary. The president of Ballet Society is Nancy Lassalle, an original board member of both the School of American Ballet and the New York City Ballet, currently emerita.

== Early history ==
Ballet Society began as a ballet company, the fourth ballet established by Balanchine and Kirstein in the United States. Its performances were for a subscription audience. The first performance took place on November 20, 1946, at the Central High School of Needle Trades in New York City. In its first season, it opened with The Four Temperaments and the Spellbound Child.

== New York City Ballet and change of mission ==
On April 28, 1948 Orpheus, presented by Ballet Society while it was still a ballet company, premiered at City Center. This prompted Morton Baum, Chairman of the Finance Committee of City Center of Music & Drama, to invite Balanchine and Kirstein to establish a resident company, renamed the New York City Ballet. Once the dance company was given a stable home at New York City Center, Ballet Society continued to operate separately as a non-profit organization in the service of the School of American Ballet and the New York City Ballet, publishing dance books and developing and funding projects related to the sustenance and encouragement of dance in the United States, while continuing to commission new ballets.

Ballet Society's purpose has been to develop an historical and pedagogical foundation for the art of ballet and dance. In its first two decades it received $200,000 in grants to research and expand the reach of ballet in the United States. With these funds Ballet Society published programs and held seminars and workshops with dance scholars, artists and dance teachers. It also commissioned and presented choreography by George Balanchine, Todd Bolender, Merce Cunningham, Lew Christensen, Francisco Moncion, and William Dollar.

Ballet Society has worked since 2001 with Eakins Press Foundation to publish works of dance scholarship or that aid dance scholarship.

== School of American Ballet ==
Balanchine and Kirstein opened the School of American Ballet in 1934 before starting any of the ballet companies they went on to found over the years. Prior to and including 1946, when they began Ballet Society, Balanchine was able to utilize the dancers from his school for his ballets.

== Grants and sponsorships ==
In 1949, Ballet Society received a grant from the Rockefeller Foundation for $2,500 for the completion of a book, published as The Classic Ballet: Basic Technique and Terminology, with a text by Muriel Stuart, illustrations by Carlus Dyer, and a foreword by George Balanchine. Lincoln Kirstin is credited with the historical development. This book remains in print today.

In 1958, Ballet Society received two significant grants from the Ford Foundation: a) $25,000 to conduct a survey and evaluate the state of ballet training in America, and b) $150,000 for the purpose of establishing scholarships for students at the School of American Ballet over a three-year period (the San Francisco Ballet School, and five other ballet schools, also received significant funds from Ford Foundation at this time for the same purpose). These grants helped establish a strong foundation and best practices for teaching dance and supporting a merit system that allowed dance schools to recruit the most gifted dancers regardless of financial restrictions.

In 1960, Ballet Society raised funds to implement a new program at the New York City Ballet. This program allowed for 3000 underprivileged children to come to a matinee performance of the ballet, meet the dancers and have exposure to live performance. The program continues to this day at the New York City Ballet.

In 1961, Ballet Society sponsored a Teachers Seminar, based on the findings of the Ford Foundation grant survey, for the purpose of upholding the highest standard of excellence in the quality of teaching ballet across the country. George Balanchine presided over the seminar through lectures and demonstrations. Ballet school directors and teachers came from all over the country to participate.

In 1964, Ballet Society received a $5000 grant from the New York State Council on the Arts to conduct lecture-demonstrations in high schools across New York City. Two teams of NYCB dancers, headed by Melissa Hayden and Edward Villella, delivered these lectures.

In 1986, Ballet Society sponsored travel for 21 New York City Ballet dancers to attend the International Ballet Festival of Nervi in Italy, where they performed works by George Balanchine, Jerome Robbins and Peter Martins.

Through 1990–1995, Ballet Society sponsored two different museum exhibitions: Les Ballets 1933 at the National Dance Museum in Saratoga Springs in 1990, and in 1993 an exhibit called Art, Craft, Creativity in the Theatre Through the Costumes of Barbara Karinska. The exhibit was followed up two years later by a book, Costumes by Karinska, with a chronology compiled for Ballet Society by Edward Bigelow, a former dancer of the NYCB who met Karinska in 1947.

In 2014, Ballet Society produced an interactive app on the Apple platform, to foster knowledge of ballet's beginnings, history and evolution as told through its relationship with art, history and classicism.

== Ballets ==
Year	Title	Composer/Choreographer/Designer	Notes	Ref.
1946	The Four Temperaments	Hindemith/Balanchine/Seligmann		
1946	The Spellbound Child	Ravel/Balanchine/Colette/Bernstein		
1947	Pastorella	Bowles/Christensen/Colt		
1947	Renard	Stravinsky/Balanchine/Francés		
1947	Divertimento	Haieff/Balanchine		
1947	The Minotaur	Carter/Taras/Junyer		
1947	Zodiac	Revil/Bolender/Francés		
1947	Highland Fling	Bate/Dollar/Ffolkes		
1947	The Seasons	Cage/Cunningham/Noguchi		
1947	Blackface	Harman/Christensen/Drew		
1948	Orpheus	Stravinsky/Balanchine/Noguchi	Symphony in C (Bizet/Balanchine)	

== Books ==
- Nijinsky, ed. Paul Magriel, Henry Holt & Co., New York, 1946
- Pavlova, ed. Paul Magriel, Henry Holt & Co., New York, 1947
- Isadora Duncan, ed. Paul Magriel, Henry Co., & Holt, New York, 1947
- Choreography by George Balanchine: A Catalogue of Works, Eakins Press, New York, NY 1983
- Portrait of Mr. B, Lincoln Kirstein, Ballet Society, New York, NY 1984
- First a School...Fifty Years of the School of American Ballet, Viking Press, New York, NY 1985
- George Balanchine: A Reference Guide, Ballet Society, New York, NY, 1987
- Costumes by Karinska, Harry N. Abrams, New York, NY 1995
- Tanaquil LeClercq: 1929–2000, edited by Nancy Lassalle and Randall Bourscheidt, Ballet Society, New York, NY 2001
- Remembering Lincoln, edited by Nancy Reynolds, Eakins Press, New York, NY 2007
- Lincoln Kirstein: A Bibliography of Published Writings 1922–1996, Eakins Press, New York, NY, 2007
