= Dramatists Guild of America =

Professional organization for playwrights, composers, and lyricists

- Established: 1919; 107 years ago
- Type: Professional organization
- Headquarters: 1501 Broadway; New York City
- Key people: Amanda Green, president
- Website: www.dramatistsguild.com

The Dramatists Guild of America is a professional organization for playwrights, composers, and lyricists working in the U.S. theatre market. It was born in 1921 out of the Authors Guild, known then as Authors League of America, formed in 1912.

Membership as an Associate Member is open to any person having written at least one stage play. Active Members are playwrights who have had at least one play produced in front of a paying audience or have had their work published by a major theatrical publisher. Student membership is also available for those enrolled in dramatic writing courses.

The Dramatists Guild works to negotiate better contracts for playwrights in professional markets and offers recommendations for contracts in other markets. The Business Affairs division assists playwrights by reviewing contracts for productions and maintains a set of contracts for Guild members to use when licensing their work.

The Dramatist is a quarterly journal produced by the Dramatists Guild, which includes articles, interviews, and other information pertinent to theatre writers.

== History ==
1912 – The constitution and by-laws of the Authors' League of America (which included 350 novelists, poets, dramatists, and magazine authors) were adopted December 13 and incorporated on December 18.

1915 – First attempt by a sub-committee of the Authors League at creating a Dramatic Contract to stake out the ill-defined rights of dramatists.

1917 – A committee headed by Cosmo Hamilton, in which Edward Childs Carpenter and Channing Pollock began their yeoman service to dramatists, drew up a new Standard Dramatic Form Contract. While some producers were cooperative, those who dominated the then powerful, tightly controlled Manager's Protective Association resented its "gall". The Shuberts sent a message via Augustus Thomas, that they would "close their theatres sooner than sign the proposed contract…managers would treat authors individually and in no other way, and that the part of good business was for a manager to get the best and most he could".

1919 – The Authors' League granted Channing Pollock's suggestion that the playwrights form an autonomous committee of 32 "working dramatists", to unite into a "Dramatic Committee" which by then had in all 112 adherents. Out of this, the Dramatists Guild was later born and baptized. Owen Davis is elected the first Guild President.

1920 – A Standard Form Minimum Dramatic Contract was negotiated between the Managers Protective Association and The Authors' League (not the still amorphous Dramatists Guild). Despite modern improvements, the contract had two vital defects: its use was not mandatory, and its terms were non-enforceable. No manager or author was required to become a member of his respective organization, and no one could be penalized for not using the contract.

1921 – In order that the Authors' League, by supplanting Bronson Howard's Society of American Dramatists and Composers, might not lead to its elimination, a liaison was made with the Dramatists Guild. The two organizations, for a year, with the same officers were officially known as "The American Dramatists".

1922 – Official naming: Dramatists Guild. Edward Childs Carpenter elected second DG president.

1924 – Arthur Richman elected third Guild president.

1926 – The birth of the first Minimum Basic Agreement (MBA). New clauses had crept into the existing polite 1920 agreement to which authors had to submit to get production; unjust trade habits were becoming precedents; red ink was blotting out protective clauses; and lastly, economic conditions had come into the theatre crying for adjustment in fairness to the managers themselves.

2021 – Amanda Green becomes the first woman elected as president of the Guild.
