= Morton Baum (lawyer) =

American politician

Morton Baum (December 28, 1905 – February 7, 1968) was an American lawyer who devised the sales tax system in New York City. He also co-founded the New York City Center in 1943 and served as its chairman from 1966 to 1968.

== Biography ==
Baum was born on December 28, 1905, and grew up in Manhattan's Upper East Side between 72nd Street and Lexington Avenue. He graduated from Columbia College in 1925 and Harvard Law School in 1928. From 1930 to 1933 he was an assistant United States Attorney and was elected a member of the New York City Board of Aldermen in 1934.

From 1935 to 1938, he was tax counsel to New York City mayor Fiorello La Guardia and helped draft the city's first sale tax plan. He also served on the finance committee of the Metropolitan Opera. In 1943, he helped found the New York City Center and served as chairman of its finance committee. He was also instrumental in helping to found the New York City Opera and the New York City Ballet by hiring the likes of Julius Rudel, George Balanchine, and Lincoln Kirstein. He was also a consultant to mayor John Lindsay's commission on city finances.

Baum was credited in reorganizing the City Center into the newly formed Lincoln Center, and served on its board. Baum served as the City Center's chairman from 1966 until his death.

Baum died on February 7, 1968, in the Columbia-Presbyterian Medical Center at age 62.
