= Ragtime (II) =

Ragtime (II) is the third ballet made by New York City Ballet's co-founder and balletmaster George Balanchine to Igor Stravinsky's Ragtime for Eleven Instruments (1918). The premiere took place on July 15, 1966, at Philharmonic Hall, New York. The first City Ballet performance was on January 17, 1967, at New York State Theater, Lincoln Center. The previous ballets made to Stravinsky's Ragtime were Ragtime (I) for City Ballet in 1960 and one of a number of "informal little things" made in St. Petersburg in 1922.

== Original cast ==
- Suzanne Farrell
- Arthur Mitchell
