= Elizabeth Kendall (historian) =

American academic (born 1947)

- Born: April 7, 1947 (age 79); St. Louis, Missouri, U.S.
- Occupations: Academic; television writer; journalist
- Awards: Guggenheim Fellow (1981)

Academic background
- Education: Radcliffe College; Harvard Graduate School of Education

Academic work
- Discipline: History
- Sub-discipline: Dance history; film studies; early-20th century Russian culture
- Institutions: The New School

Elizabeth Bemis Kendall (born April 7, 1947) is an American academic, television writer, and journalist. After working as a writer for the PBS show Great Performances and an editor for Ballet Review, she published several books – particularly Where She Danced (1979), The Runaway Bride: Hollywood Romantic Comedy of the 1930s (1992), and Balanchine and the Lost Muse (2013) – mostly focusing on dance history. She is Associate Professor of Liberal Studies and Literary Studies at The New School.

== Biography ==
Elizabeth Bemis Kendall was born on April 7, 1947 in St. Louis, Missouri. Her parents were Betty (née Conant) and falconer Henry Cochran Kendall. On April 3, 1969, she and her mother were injured when the station wagon she was driving crashed into an abutment on U.S. Route 61; her mother died from her injuries afterwards.

She received her Bachelor of Arts (1969) at Radcliffe College and Master of Arts in Teaching in Language and Literature (1971) at the Harvard Graduate School of Education. After working as a Rockefeller Foundation Fellow (1975–1976), she wrote two 1977 episodes of Great Performances: "Pilobolus Dance Theater" and "Trailblazers of Modern Dance". In 1979, she published the dance history book Where She Danced, became a contributor for Ballet News and a contributing editor for Ballet Review. She was an administrator for the NYIH's Culture of Cities program (1979–1981), and she was a New York Institute for the Humanities (NYIH) Fellow (1980–1982), and Ford Foundation fellow (1980–1982).

In 1981, Kendall was awarded a Guggenheim Fellowship "for a study of Hollywood lyric comedy in the 1930's", and she later published The Runaway Bride: Hollywood Romantic Comedy of the 1930s in 1992. In 2000, she published her memoir American Daughter. In 2008, she published Autobiography of a Wardrobe, a memoir of herself from the perspective of her own attire. In 2013, she published Balanchine and the Lost Muse, a book on the relationship between ballet choreographer George Balanchine and ballet dancer Lidia Ivanova.

She was also a National Arts Journalism Program Senior Fellow (2002–2003), a New York Public Library Dorothy and Lewis B. Cullman Center for Scholars and Writers Fellow (2004–2005), a Likhachev Foundation Fellow (2009), and a Leon Levy Center for Biography Fellow (2011–2012).

As an academic, she specializes in non-fiction, Russian culture in the early-20th century, and history of clothing and textiles. At New School, she has taught classes on non-fiction, general literature, and cultural history.

== Bibliography ==
- Where She Danced (1979)
- The Runaway Bride: Hollywood Romantic Comedy of the 1930s (1992)
- American Daughter (2000, memoir)
- Autobiography of a Wardrobe (2008)
- Balanchine and the Lost Muse (2013)
