= Maro Ajemian =

American pianist

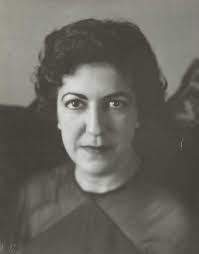
- Maro Ajemian in late 1950s

Background information
- Born: July 9, 1921
- Died: September 18, 1978 (aged 57); Houston, Texas, U.S.
- Genres: Classical
- Occupation: Performer
- Instrument: Piano

Maro Ajemian (Armenian: Մարօ Աճէմեան; July 9, 1921 – September 18, 1978) was an American pianist. Ajemian's career in contemporary music grew from her Armenian heritage. She became known as a contemporary pianist after performing the U.S. premiere of Aram Khachaturian's Piano Concerto, which she chose to play based on their shared Armenian heritage.

Ajemian studied at the Juilliard School of Music. On March 14, 1942, she gave the American premiere of Aram Khachaturian's Piano Concerto in D flat with the Juilliard Graduate Orchestra under Albert Stoessel. She later performed the piece on a cross-country tour. Following her performances of the Piano Concerto, Ajemian began meeting contemporary composers and, together with her sister, the violinist Anahid Ajemian, she became known as a champion of new music, presenting the premieres of many new works by American composers. Among these were John Cage, Alan Hovhaness, Henry Cowell, Ernst Krenek, Lou Harrison, and Gunther Schuller. Cage dedicated his Sonatas and Interludes to her and she made the first recording of them for Dial Records in 1951.

Ajemian was particularly fond of the music of Hovhaness, a fellow Armenian American, and co-founded a New York City-based organization, the Friends of Armenian Music Committee, which promoted his music during the 1940s, presenting annual concerts in such high-profile venues as Town Hall. These concerts were well reviewed by such critics as Lou Harrison, Virgil Thomson, and Olin Downes, and served to launch Hovhaness into the national spotlight.

She died of heart valve failure at her home in Houston, Texas at the age of 57. A memorial service was held at St. Vartan’s Cathedral in Manhattan, New York City.
