= George Balanchine =

Georgian-American ballet choreographer (1904–1983)

- გიორგი ბალანჩივაძე
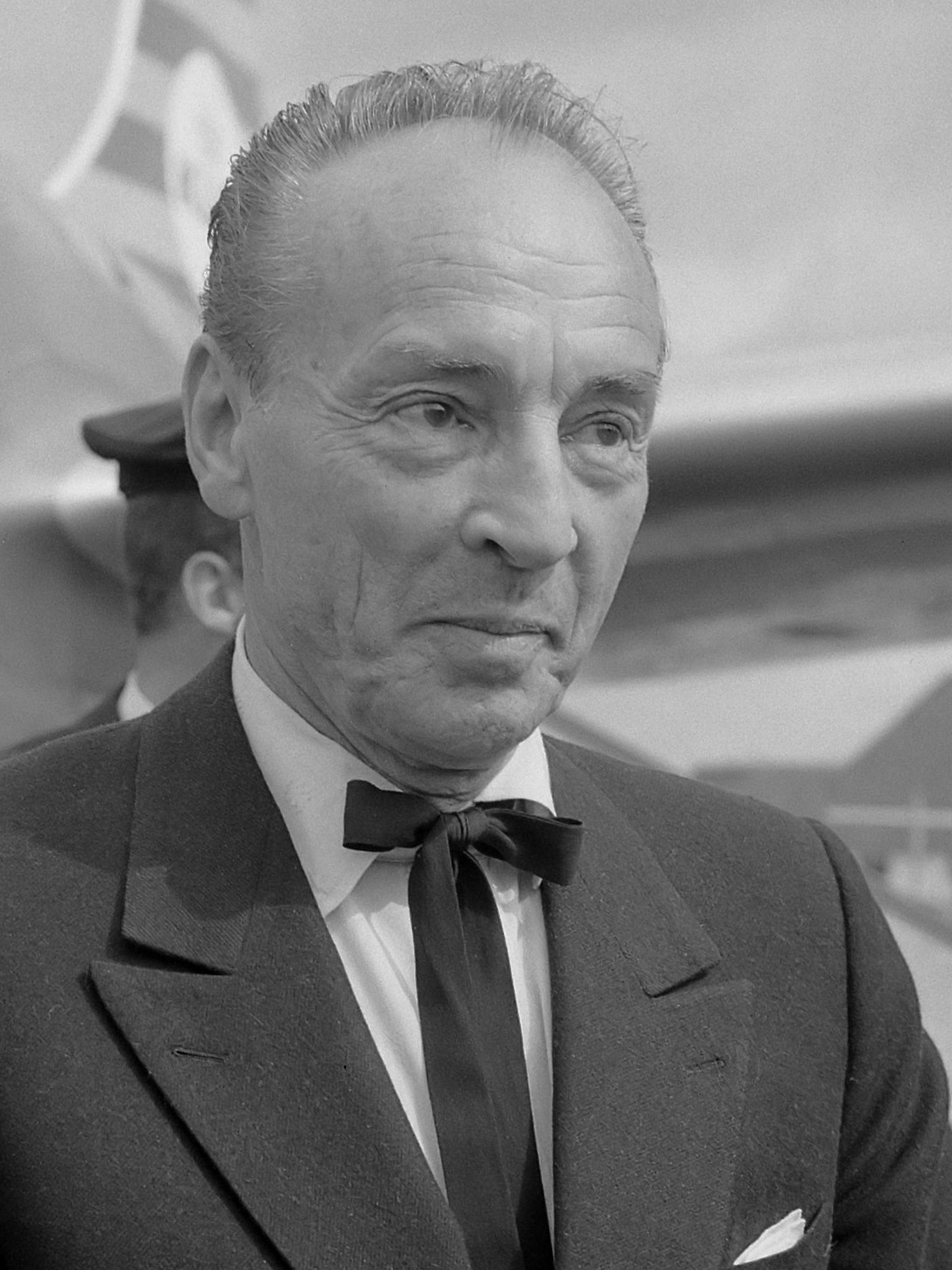
- Balanchine in 1965
- Born: Georgiy Melitonovich Balanchivadze; January 22, 1904; Saint Petersburg, Russia
- Died: April 30, 1983 (aged 79); New York City, U.S.
- Occupations: Dancer; choreographer; director
- Years active: 1929–1983
- Spouses: Tamara Geva (m. 1921; div. 1926) Vera Zorina (m. 1938; div. 1946) Maria Tallchief (m. 1946; ann. 1952) Tanaquil LeClercq (m. 1952; div. 1969)
- Partner: Alexandra Danilova (1926–1933)
- Awards: Presidential Medal of Freedom, among others (see below)

George Balanchine (/ˈbælən(t)ʃiːn, ˌbælənˈ(t)ʃiːn/; born Georgiy Melitonovich Balanchivadze; (Note: In this name that follows East Slavic naming customs, the patronymic is Melitonovich and the family name is Balanchivadze.) (Note: Russian: Георгий Мелитонович Баланчивадзе, romanized: Georgy Melitonovich Balanchivadze; Georgian: გიორგი მელიტონის ძე ბალანჩივაძე, romanized: Giorgi Melit'onis dze Balanchivadze) January 22, 1904 [O.S. January 9] – April 30, 1983) was a Russian-American (Note: Attributed to the following sources:) ballet choreographer of Georgian descent. He is recognized as one of the most influential choreographers of the 20th century. Styled as the father of American ballet, he co-founded the New York City Ballet and remained its artistic director for more than 35 years. His choreography is characterized by plotless ballets with minimal costume and décor, performed to classical and neoclassical music.

Born in Saint Petersburg, Russia, Balanchine took the standards and technique from his time at the Imperial Ballet School and fused it with other schools of movement that he had adopted during his tenure on Broadway and in Hollywood, creating his signature "neoclassical style".

He was a choreographer known for his musicality; he expressed music with dance and worked extensively with leading composers of his time like Igor Stravinsky. Balanchine was invited to America in 1933 by Lincoln Kirstein, a young arts patron; together they founded the School of American Ballet in 1934 as well as the New York City Ballet in 1948.

== Early life and family ==
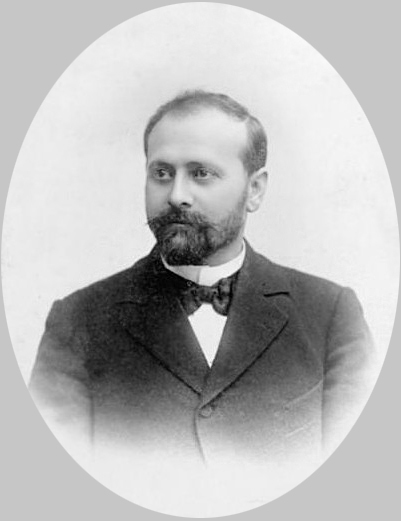
Balanchine's father Meliton, early 1890s

Balanchine was born Georgiy Melitonovich Balanchivadze in Saint Petersburg, Russia, son of Georgian opera singer and composer Meliton Balanchivadze, one of the founders of the Tbilisi Opera and Ballet Theatre. His father later served as the culture minister of the Georgian Democratic Republic, which became independent in 1918 but was soon incorporated into the Soviet Union following the Red Army invasion of Georgia.

The rest of the Georgian side of Balanchine's family consisted largely of artists and soldiers. Little is known of Balanchine's Russian, maternal side. His mother, Meliton's second wife, Maria Nikolayevna Vasilyeva, is said to be the daughter of Nikolai von Almedingen, a German. He later left Russia and abandoned his family, causing Maria to take her mother's name. Maria was fond of ballet and viewed it as a form of social advancement from the lower reaches of Saint Petersburg society. She was eleven years younger than Meliton and rumored to have been his former housekeeper, although "she had at least some culture in her background" as she could play piano well. Maria also worked at a bank.

Although she loved ballet, she wanted her son to join the military. This was a difficult topic to enforce in the family because not only was the mother artistic, George's father was also very talented at playing the piano. Many believe that because his father was very invested in the arts, Balanchine's career of being a businessman failed. Balanchine had three other siblings. His brother Andrei Balanchivadze became a well-known Georgian composer like their father.

Even after immigrating to the United States, Balanchine tried to stay connected to his Georgian roots. He engaged across the Iron Curtain with Georgian artists, who admired him.

== Career ==
=== Early auditions and training ===
As a child, Balanchine was not particularly interested in ballet, but his mother insisted that he audition with his sister Tamara, who shared her mother's interest in the art. Balanchine's brother Andria Balanchivadze followed their father's love for music and became a composer in Soviet Georgia. Tamara's life as a dancer, however, would be cut short by her death in unknown circumstances as she was trying to escape to Georgia on a train from the Siege of Leningrad during World War II.

Based on his audition, during 1913 (at age nine), Balanchine relocated from rural Finland to Saint Petersburg and was accepted into the Imperial Ballet School, principal school of the Imperial Ballet, where he was a student of Pavel Gerdt and Samuil Andrianov (Gerdt's son-in-law).

Balanchine studied dance at the Mariinsky School & Theater until it closed down in 1917 due to government decree. His taking ballet here could have been viewed as a convenience to the Balanchivadze family, because this is where his father composed music. After the Revolution, this theater was transferred to the People's Enlightenment Commissariat and became property of the state. The Theater reopened in 1918; two years later it was renamed as the State Academic Theater of Opera and Ballet.

Balanchine had begun to choreograph and mounted some new and experimental ballets for the Mikhailovsky Theatre in Petrograd (as the city was renamed. It later was renamed again as Leningrad.) Among them were Le Boeuf sur le toit (1920), by Jean Cocteau and music by Darius Milhaud. He also created a piece for Caesar and Cleopatra by Irish playwright George Bernard Shaw.

After graduating in 1921, Balanchine enrolled in the Petrograd Conservatory while working in the corps de ballet at the State Academic Theater for Opera and Ballet. (This was formerly the State Theater of Opera and Ballet and known as the Mariinsky Ballet). His studies at the conservatory included advanced piano, music theory, counterpoint, harmony, and composition. Balanchine graduated from the conservatory in 1923, and danced as a member of the corps until 1924. While still in his teens, Balanchine choreographed his first work, a pas de deux named La Nuit (1920, music by Anton Rubinstein). a piece which The school of directors did not approve of or like this work.

Balanchine worked at his choreography in an experimental way during his evenings. He and his colleagues eventually performed this piece at the State School of Ballet. This was followed by another duet, Enigma, with the dancers in bare feet rather than ballet shoes. While teaching at the Mariinsky Ballet, he met Tamara Geva, his future wife. In 1923, with Geva and fellow dancers, Balanchine formed a small ensemble that presented Evenings of the Young Ballet. The group's first evening was a three-part performance that included homages to Marius Petipa and Mikhail Fokine and a final section devoted to Balanchine's own choreographed dances.

=== Ballets Russes ===
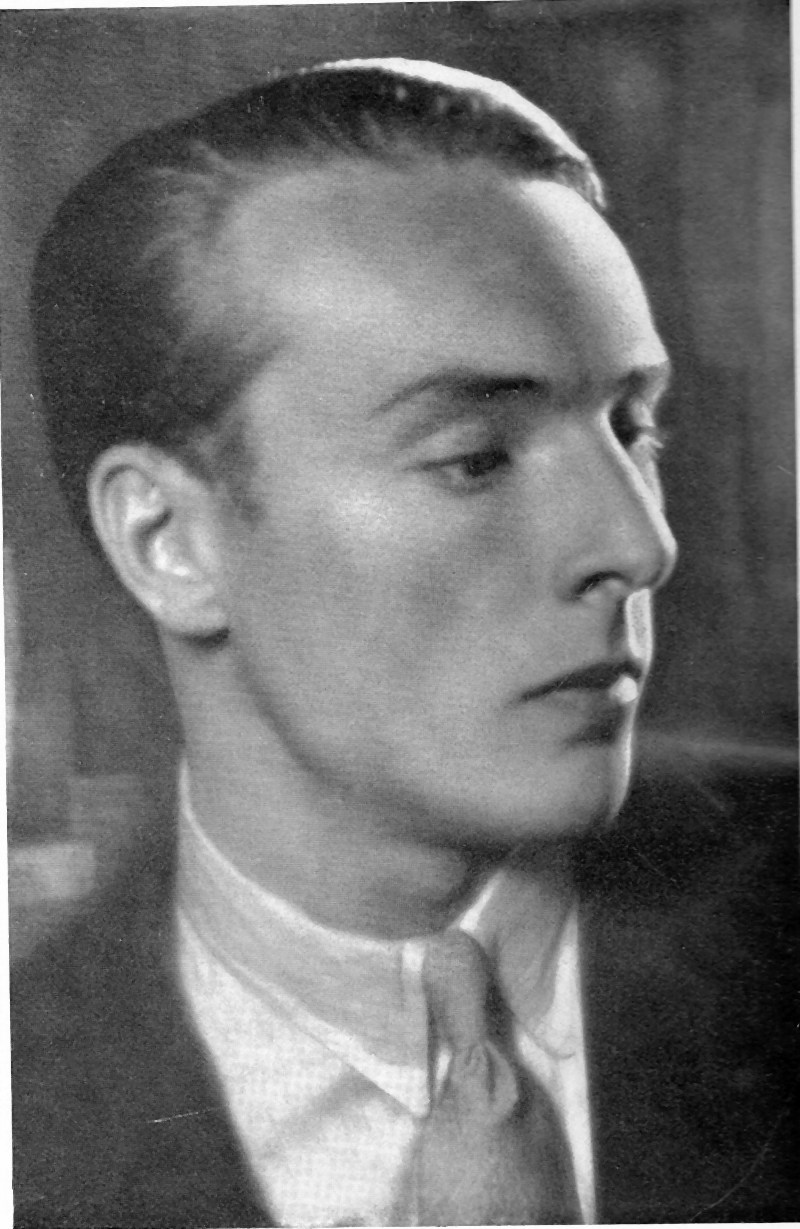
Young Balanchine, pictured in the 1920s

In 1924, the Young Ballet managed to obtain a permission to leave Soviet Russia and tour around Europe. Balanchine with his wife, Tamara Geva, and several other dancers (Alexandra Danilova, Nicholas Efimov) went to Germany, but their performances in Berlin received a chilly response. The Young Ballet had to perform in small cities of the Rhine Province such as Wiesbaden, Bad Ems, and Moselle. Geva wrote later, that in that time they had to dance 'in small dark places, in summer theaters and private ballrooms, in beer gardens and before mental patients'. They could barely afford paying for hotels and often had only tea for a meal. In London, they had two weeks of very unsuccessful performances, when the audience met them with dead silence. With expiring visas, they were not welcome in any other European country. The young dancers settled in Paris, where there was a large Russian emigre community.

In November of 1924, the Russian impresario Sergei Diaghilev, who was based in Paris and had heard of the troupe but not seen any of their dances, invited them to audition for him. Impressed, Diaghilev asked Balanchine to join the Ballets Russes as a choreographer. Balanchine was 21 and became the main choreographer for the most famous ballet company in Europe. Sergei Diaghilev insisted that Balanchine change his name from Balanchivadze to Balanchine. Diaghilev soon promoted Balanchine to ballet master of the company and encouraged his choreography.

Between 1924 and Diaghilev's death in 1929, Balanchine created ten ballets, as well as lesser works. During these years, he worked with rising young composers such as Sergei Prokofiev, Igor Stravinsky, Erik Satie, and Maurice Ravel, and artists who designed sets and costumes, such as Pablo Picasso, Georges Rouault, and Henri Matisse, creating new works that combined all the arts.

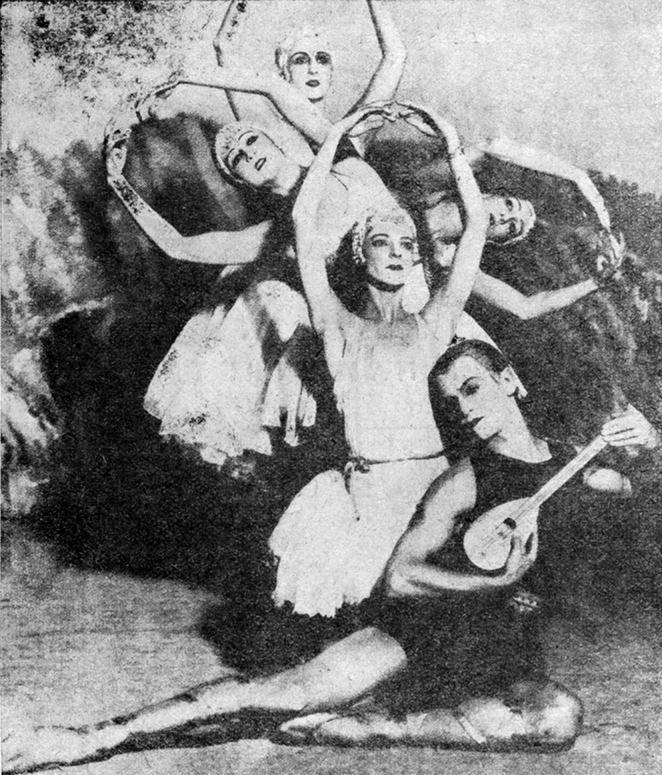
Apollon musagète, 1928

Among his new works, during 1928 in Paris, Balanchine premiered Apollon musagète (Apollo and the muses) in a collaboration with Stravinsky. This was one of his most innovative ballets, combining classical ballet and classical Greek myth and images with jazz movement. He described it as "the turning point in my life". Apollo is regarded as the original neoclassical ballet. Apollo brought the male dancer to the forefront, giving him two solos within the ballet. Apollo is known for its minimalism, using simple costumes and sets. This allowed the audience not to be distracted from the movement. Balanchine considered music to be the primary influence on choreography, as opposed to the narrative.

Due to a serious knee injury, Balanchine had to limit his dancing, effectively ending his own performance career. So he decided to focus all his attention on choreography.

After Diaghilev's death, the Ballets Russes went bankrupt. To earn money, Balanchine began to stage dances for Charles B. Cochran's revues and Sir Oswald Stoll's variety shows in London. He was retained by the Royal Danish Ballet in Copenhagen as a guest ballet master. Among his new works for the company were Danses Concertantes, a pure dance piece to music by Stravinsky, and Night Shadow, revived under the title La Sonnambula.

In 1931, with the help of financier Serge Denham, René Blum and Colonel Wassily de Basil formed the Ballets Russes de Monte-Carlo, a successor to Ballets Russes. The new company hired Leonide Massine and Balanchine as choreographers. Featured dancers included David Lichine and Tatiana Riabouchinska. In 1933, without consulting Blum, Col. de Basil dropped Balanchine after one year, – ostensibly because he thought that audiences preferred the works choreographed by Massine. Librettist Boris Kochno was also let go, while dancer Tamara Toumanova (a strong admirer of Balanchine) left the company when Balanchine was fired.

Balanchine and Kochno immediately founded Les Ballets 1933. Kochno, Diaghilev's former secretary and companion, served as artistic advisor. The company was financed by Edward James, a British poet and ballet patron. The company lasted only a couple of months during 1933, performing in Paris and London. The worldwide Great Depression made arts more difficult to fund. Balanchine created several new works, including collaborations with composers Kurt Weill, Darius Milhaud, Henri Sauguet and designer Pavel Tchelitchew.

=== United States ===
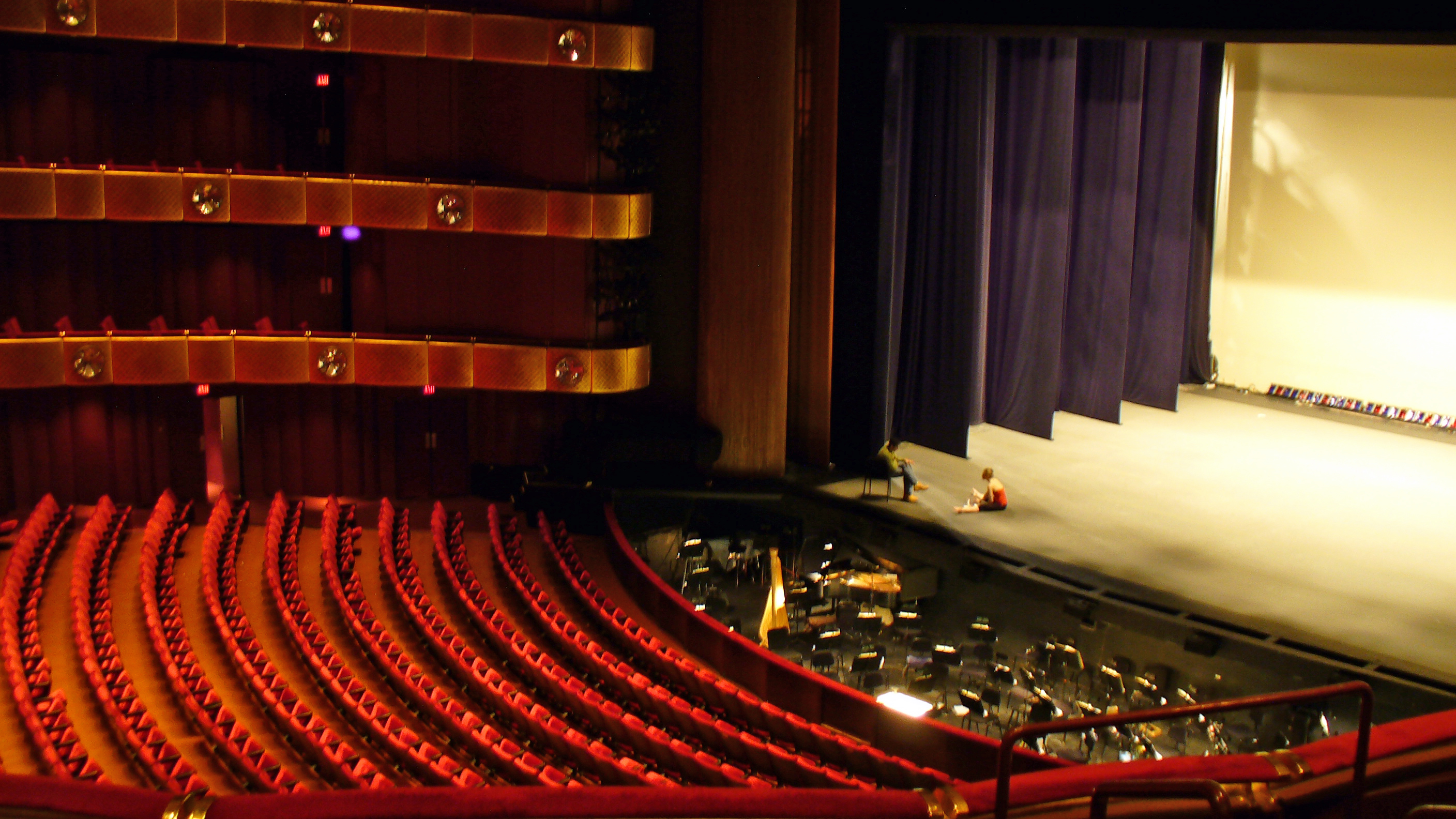
Architect Philip Johnson designed the New York State Theater to Balanchine's specifications.

Balanchine moved to the United States in 1933 at the behest of Lincoln Kirstein. Balanchine insisted that his first project in the United States would be to establish a ballet school, because he wanted to develop dancers who had strong technique along with his particular style. Compared to his classical training, he thought American dancers lacked strength and skills. With the assistance of Lincoln Kirstein and Edward M.M. Warburg, the School of American Ballet opened to students on January 2, 1934, less than three months after Balanchine arrived in the U.S.

Later that year, Balanchine had his students perform in a recital, where they premiered his new work Serenade to music by Tchaikovsky at Woodlands, the Warburg summer estate. It became part of the Canon of the company.

In 1948, Balanchine and Kirstein founded the New York City Ballet. The school of American Ballet became and is now a training ground for dancers of New York City Ballet and companies from all over the world.

Between his ballet activities in the 1930s and 1940s, Balanchine also choreographed Broadway musicals written by such notables as Richard Rodgers, Lorenz Hart and Vernon Duke. Among them, Balanchine choreographed Rodgers and Hart's On Your Toes in 1936, where his program billing specified "Choreography by George Balanchine" as opposed to the usual billing of "Dances staged by". This marked the first time in Broadway history that a dance-maker received choreography billing for a Broadway musical. On Your Toes featured two ballets: La Princesse Zenobia and Slaughter on Tenth Avenue, in which a tap dancer falls in love with a dance-hall girl. Balanchine's choreography in musicals was unique at the time because it furthered the plot of the story.

=== Relocation to West Coast ===
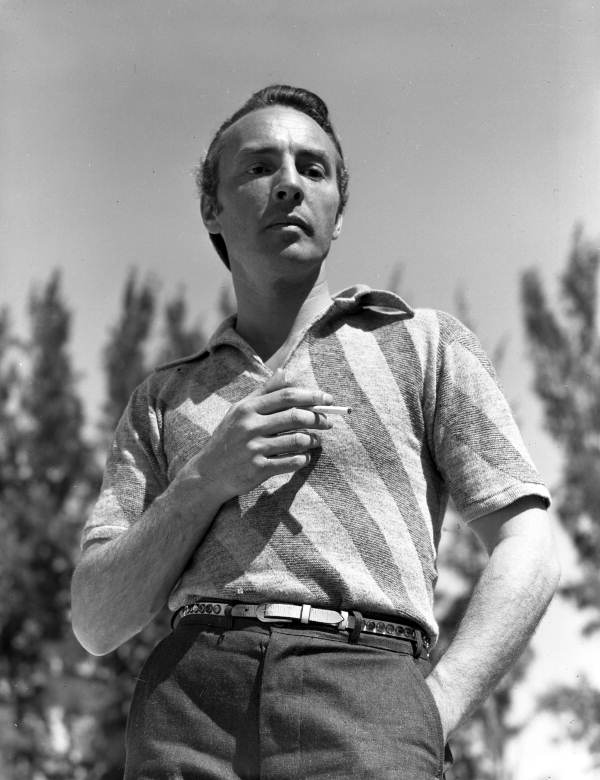
Balanchine in 1942

Balanchine relocated his company to Hollywood in 1938, where he rented a white two-story house with "Kolya", Nicholas Kopeikine, his "rehearsal pianist and lifelong colleague", on North Fairfax Avenue not far from Hollywood Boulevard. Balanchine created dances for five movies, all of which featured Vera Zorina, whom he met on the set of The Goldwyn Follies and who subsequently became his second wife. He reconvened the company as the American Ballet Caravan and toured with it throughout North and South America, but it folded after several years. From 1944 to 1946, during and after World War II, Balanchine served as resident choreographer for Blum & Massine's new iteration of Ballet Russe de Monte-Carlo.

=== Return to New York ===
Soon Balanchine formed a new dance company, Ballet Society, again with the generous help of Lincoln Kirstein. He continued to work with contemporary composers such as Paul Hindemith, from whom he commissioned a score in 1940 for The Four Temperaments. First performed on November 20, 1946, this modernist work was one of his early abstract and spare ballets, angular and very different in movement. After several successful performances, the most notable featuring the ballet Orpheus created in collaboration with Stravinsky and sculptor and designer Isamu Noguchi, the City of New York offered the company residency at New York City Center.

In 1954, Balanchine created his version of The Nutcracker, in which he played the mime role of Drosselmeyer. The company has since performed the ballet every year in New York City during the Christmas season. His other famous ballets created for New York companies include Firebird, Allegro Brilliante, Agon, The Seven Deadly Sins, and Episodes.

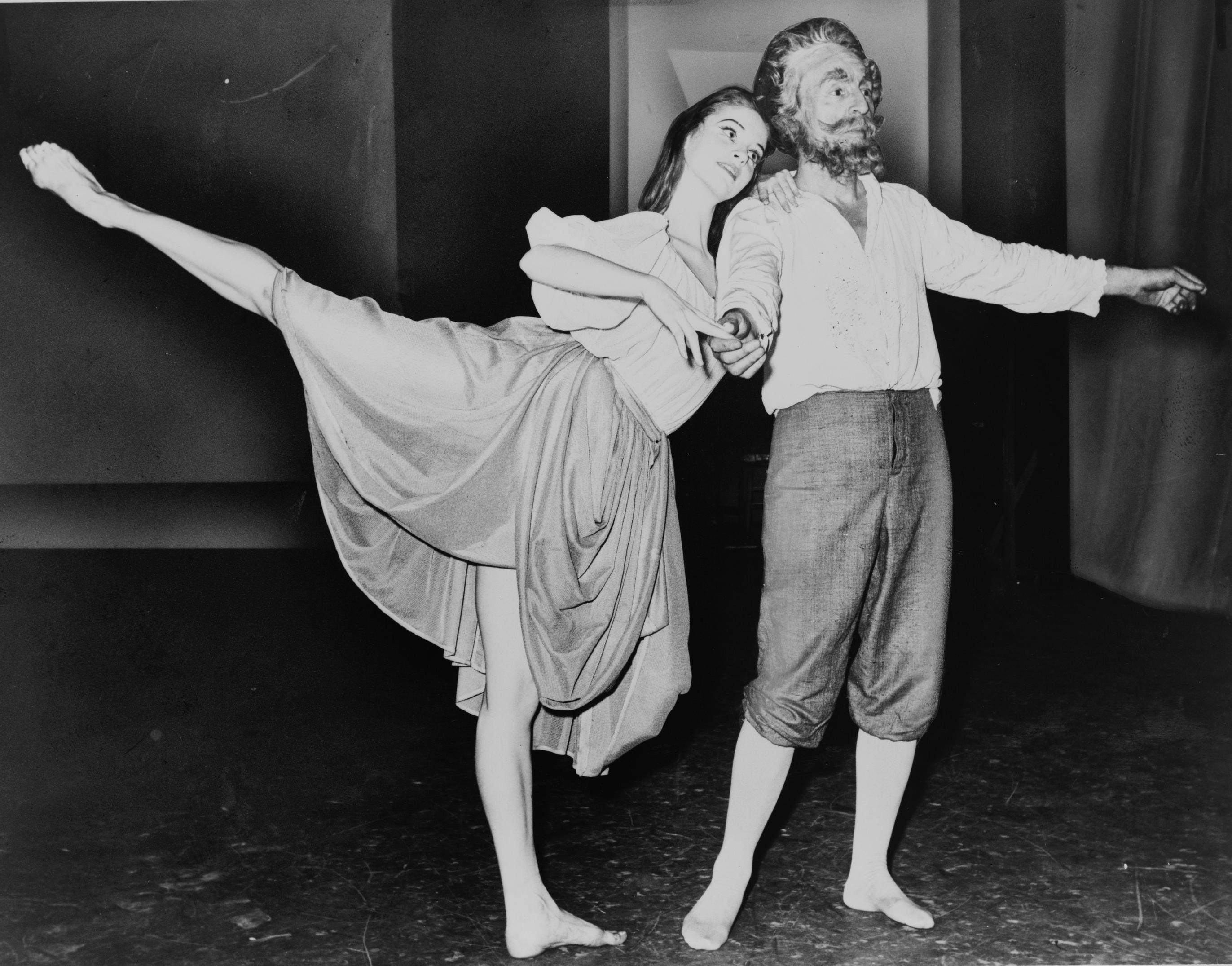
Balanchine with Suzanne Farrell in Don Quixote

In 1967, Balanchine's ballet Jewels displayed specific characteristics of Balanchine's choreography. The corps de ballet dancers execute rapid footwork and precise movements. The choreography is difficult to execute and all dancers must do their jobs to hold the integrity of the piece. Balanchine's use of musicality can also be seen in this work. His other famous works with New York City Ballet are popular today and are performed in the Lincoln Center by New York City Ballet: Mozartiana, Apollo, Orpheus, and A Midsummer Night's Dream.

=== Death ===
In his last years, Balanchine suffered from angina pectoris and underwent heart bypass surgery.

After years of illness, Balanchine died on April 30, 1983, aged 79, in Manhattan from Creutzfeldt–Jakob disease. This was diagnosed only after his death. He first showed symptoms during 1978 when he began losing his balance while dancing. As the disease progressed, his equilibrium, eyesight, and hearing deteriorated. By 1982, he was incapacitated.

The night of his death, the company went on with its scheduled performance, which included Divertimento No. 15 and Symphony in C at Lincoln Center.

Clement Crisp, one of the many writers who eulogized Balanchine, assessed his contribution: "It is hard to think of the ballet world without the colossal presence of George Balanchine ..." In his lifetime he created 465 works. Balanchine extended the traditions of classical ballet. His choreography remains the same to the present day and the School of American Ballet still uses his teaching technique. As one of the 20th century's best-known choreographers, his style and vision of ballet is interesting to many generations of choreographers.

Having kept his faith, he had a Russian Orthodox funeral. He was interred at the Oakland Cemetery at Sag Harbor, Suffolk County, New York. Alexandra Danilova was also later interred here.

== The Balanchine Style ==
Starting out his professional career with opera ballets, Balanchine did not take classicism as the a priori theory, but instead searched for his own style through the 1930s. It is widely accepted that Balanchine had established the American ballet style, and the Neoclassical style that Balanchine consolidated represents the American spirit.

=== Straying away from the European traditions ===
While the European classical ballet often creates a fantasy world filled with "magic sylphs and swans", Balanchine diverted from the traditional story-telling method and let dancers just be dancers who showcase their artistic ability through movements. Throughout Balanchine's career, he created many neoclassical leotard ballets in which dancers perform in simple leotards rather than excessive costumes. Balanchine's removal of characters, storytelling, and costumes bring ballet back into reality to redefine the beauty of dance in its purest form. As the formalist David Michael Levin commented, "Balanchine has mastered the deepest logic of this intrinsic, expressive power of the human body".

=== African influence and elements ===
Although ballet has been seen as a white European art form, scholars such as Brenda Dixon Gottschild have argued for the presence of the African influence in Balanchine's work, marking the African presence in American ballet.

Moving to the United States, Balanchine was close to African American artists such as Katherine Dunham. According to dancers who worked with Balanchine such as Arthur Mitchell who comes from an African background, Balanchine would send students to Dunham or have dancers with an African background demonstrate skills common in African dance.

The displacement of hips instead of vertical alignment, angular arms and flexed wrists, and the non-traditional timing of movements are the several key elements in Balanchine's works that scholars identify as developed under the African influence.

Incorporation of African elements and dancers from an African cultural background made Balanchine's works American. The phenomenon of cultural influences and combinations in his works represent the diversity in the American society.

== Personal life ==
In 1923, Balanchine married Tamara Geva, a sixteen-year-old dancer. After later parting ways with Geva, he became romantically involved with the ballerina Alexandra Danilova, from approximately 1924 to 1931. As The New York Times described their relationship in its obituary for Danilova: "She and Balanchine left the Soviet Union in 1924... Until 1931, she and Balanchine lived together as husband and wife, although they were never married. Balanchine was still officially married to another dancer, Tamara Geva, and he told Miss Danilova that because his marriage papers had been left behind in Russia, he feared it might be difficult to arrange a legal separation." He married and divorced three more times, all to women who were his dancers: Vera Zorina (1938–1946), Maria Tallchief (1946–1952), and Tanaquil LeClercq (1952–1969). He had no children by any of his marriages. However the number of pregnancies and children he was responsible for in his young dancers is not publicly available. Famously, he had many extramarital liaisons.

Biographer and intellectual historian Clive James has argued that Balanchine, despite his creative genius and brilliance as a ballet choreographer, had his darker side. In his Cultural Amnesia: Necessary Memories from History and the Arts (2007), James writes that:

the great choreographer ruled the New York City Ballet as a fiefdom, with the 'droit du seigneur' among his privileges. The older he became, the more consuming his love affairs with his young ballerinas ... When ballerina Suzanne Farrell fell in love with and married a young dancer, Balanchine dismissed her from the company, thereby injuring her career for a crucial decade.

This claim was disputed in Suzanne Farrell's autobiography Holding onto the Air, as well as John Clifford's autobiography Balanchine's Apprentice: From Hollywood to New York and Back. Both books report that Farrell herself resigned, after which she joined Maurice Béjart's "Ballets of the 20th Century" for five years before rejoining the New York City Ballet and continuing to collaborate with Balanchine.

== Legacy and honors ==
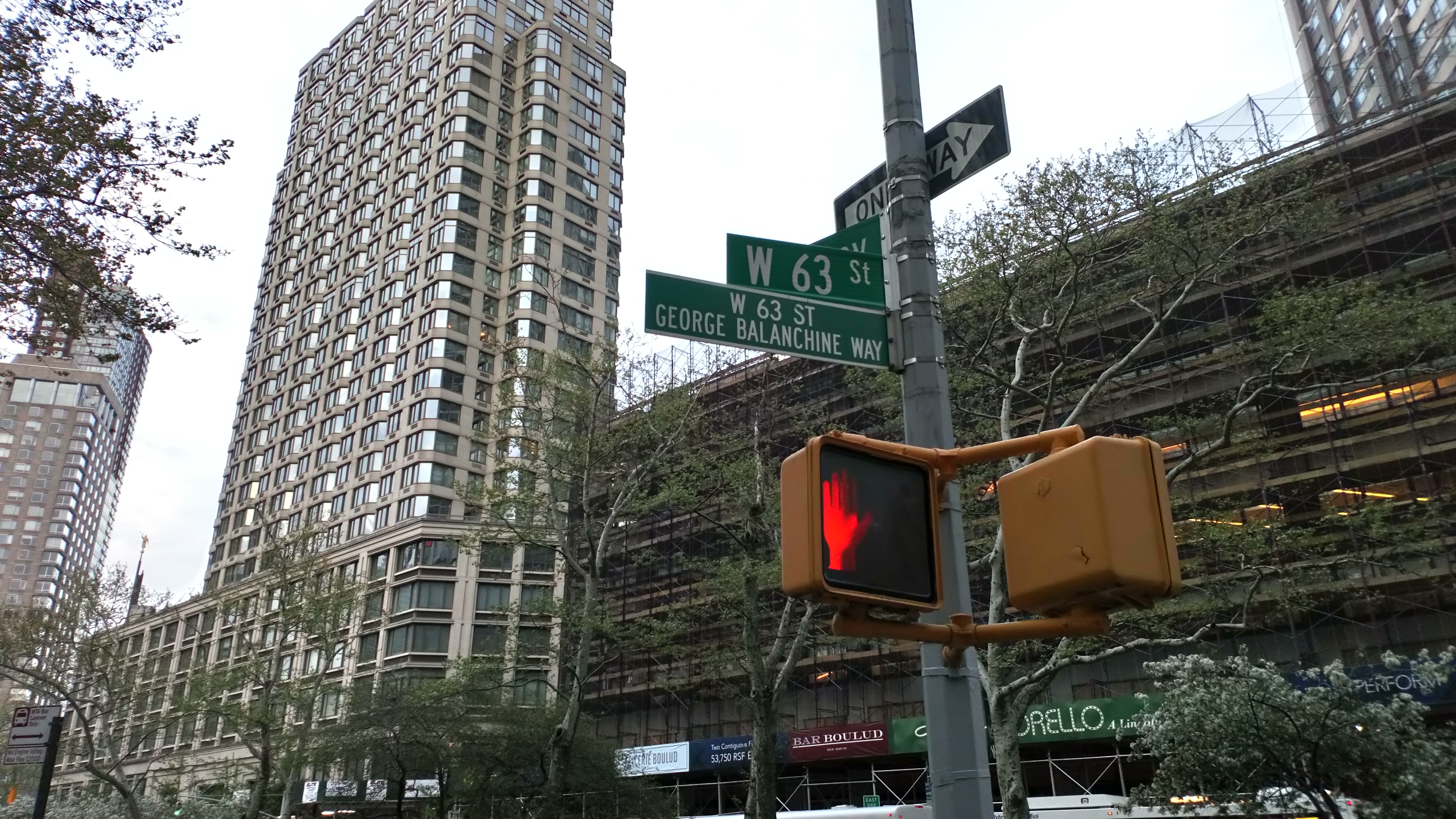
George Balanchine Way in New York

With his School of American Ballet, New York City Ballet, and 400 choreographed works, Balanchine transformed American dance and created neoclassical ballet, developing a unique style with his dancers highlighted by brilliant speed and attack.

A monument at the Tbilisi Opera and Ballet Theatre in Georgia was dedicated in Balanchine's memory. A crater on Mercury was named in his honor.

George Balanchine Way is a segment of West 63rd Street (located between Columbus Avenue and Broadway) in New York City that was renamed in his honor in June 1990.

Playwright Richard Nelson wrote Nikolai and the Others, produced at the Mitzi Newhouse theater at Lincoln Center in 2013 with Michael Cerveris as Balanchine. In 2015, a biopic of Balanchine was announced by Gulfstream Pictures, written by David K. Israel and adapted from Elizabeth Kendall's Balanchine & the Lost Muse: Revolution & the Making of a Choreographer although as of 2026 this remains unproduced.

=== As the Teacher ===
Apart from his legacy in establishing the American-style ballet, Balanchine also contributed to the ballet education in the United States. Upon his arrival in the United States in 1933, Balanchine sensed the urgency of establishing an institutionalized ballet school to deliver systematic training in ballet.

Established in 1934, the School of American Ballet was taught based on the Russian ballet style Balanchine once received himself with his own alternations. Balanchine's pedagogues focused on clarity and breadth of motion, sharpness of nuance, and intensity of image.

Balanchine's lessons delivered were not set in stone, but instead an evolving glossary: he continuously tested his concepts on the stage, and renewed his teaching from time to time to reflect the most up-to-date ideal concepts.

=== Awards ===
- 1975 French Légion d'honneur
- 1978 Kennedy Center Honors
- 1980 Austrian Decoration for Science and Art
- 1983 Presidential Medal of Freedom
- 1987 National Museum of Dance's Mr. & Mrs. Cornelius Vanderbilt Whitney Hall of Fame (posthumously)
- 1988 Induction into the American Theater Hall of Fame
- Kisselgoff, Anna. "Balanchine 100: The Centennial Celebration"

== Selected choreographed works ==
- 1928 Apollo
- 1929 The Prodigal Son
- 1935 Serenade
- 1936 Slaughter on Tenth Avenue
- 1936 Zenobia
- 1936 Ziegfeld Follies of 1936
- 1937 Jeu de cartes
- 1938 The Boys from Syracuse
- 1940 Cabin in the Sky
- 1941 Concerto Barocco
- 1941 Tschaikovsky Piano Concerto No. 2
- 1942 Circus Polka
- 1946 La Sonnambula
- 1946 The Four Temperaments
- 1947 Symphonie Concertante
- 1947 Symphony in C
- 1947 Theme and Variations
- 1948 Orpheus
- 1948 Where's Charley?
- 1949 Bourrée fantasque
- 1949 The Firebird
- 1951 La Valse
- 1951 Swan Lake (Act 2)
- 1951 Courtin' Time
- 1952 Bayou
- 1952 Scotch Symphony
- 1954 Ivesiana
- 1954 Western Symphony
- 1956 Allegro Brillante
- 1956 Divertimento No. 15
- 1957 Agon
- 1957 Square Dance
- 1958 Gounod Symphony
- 1958 Stars and Stripes
- 1959 Episodes
- 1960 Donizetti Variations
- 1960 Liebeslieder Walzer
- 1960 Monumentum pro Gesualdo
- 1960 Ragtime (I)
- 1960 Tschaikovsky Pas de Deux
- 1961 Raymonda Variations
- 1962 A Midsummer Night's Dream
- 1963 Bugaku
- 1964 Tarantella
- 1965 Don Quixote
- 1965 Harlequinade
- 1966 Brahms–Schoenberg Quartet
- 1966 Variations
- 1967 Divertimento Brillante
- 1967 Jewels
  - Emeralds
  - Rubies
  - Diamonds
- 1967 Ragtime (II)
- 1968 Metastaseis and Pithoprakta
- 1968 Requiem Canticles
- 1968 La Source
- 1968 Slaughter on Tenth Avenue
- 1970 Tschaikovsky Suite No. 3
- 1970 Who Cares?
- 1972 Duo Concertant
- 1972 Pulcinella
- 1972 Scherzo à la Russe
- 1972 Stravinsky Violin Concerto
- 1972 Symphony in Three Movements
- 1973 Cortège Hongrois
- 1975 Le tombeau de Couperin
- 1975 The Steadfast Tin Soldier
- 1976 Chaconne
- 1976 Union Jack
- 1977 Vienna Waltzes
- 1978 Ballo della Regina
- 1978 Kammermusik No. 2
- 1979 Le Bourgeois Gentilhomme
- 1980 Ballade
- 1980 Robert Schumann's Davidsbündlertänze
- 1980 Walpurgisnacht Ballet
- 1981 Garland Dance
- 1981 Mozartiana
- 1982 Élégie
- 1982 Noah and the Flood

== Notable students ==
Over the decades Balanchine shared his artistic insights with several of his students including:

- Francisco Moncion
- Nicholas Magallanes

== See also ==
- Balanchine method
- Contemporary ballet
- List of dancers
- List of Russian ballet dancers
- List of Eastern Bloc defectors
- Category: Ballets by George Balanchine
- Category:Musicals choreographed by George Balanchine

== Sources ==
- Taper, Bernard (1996). Balanchine: A Biography. University of California Press. ISBN 9780520206397.
- Polisadova, O. N. (2013). Балетмейстеры ХХ века : индивидуальный взгляд на развитие хореографического искусства [Ballet-master of XXth century: An Individual approach to choreography] (PDF) (in Russian). Vladimir State University. ISBN 978-5-9984-0395-8. Archived from the original (PDF) on December 26, 2022.
