= Mary Ellen Moylan =

American ballet dancer (1925–2020)

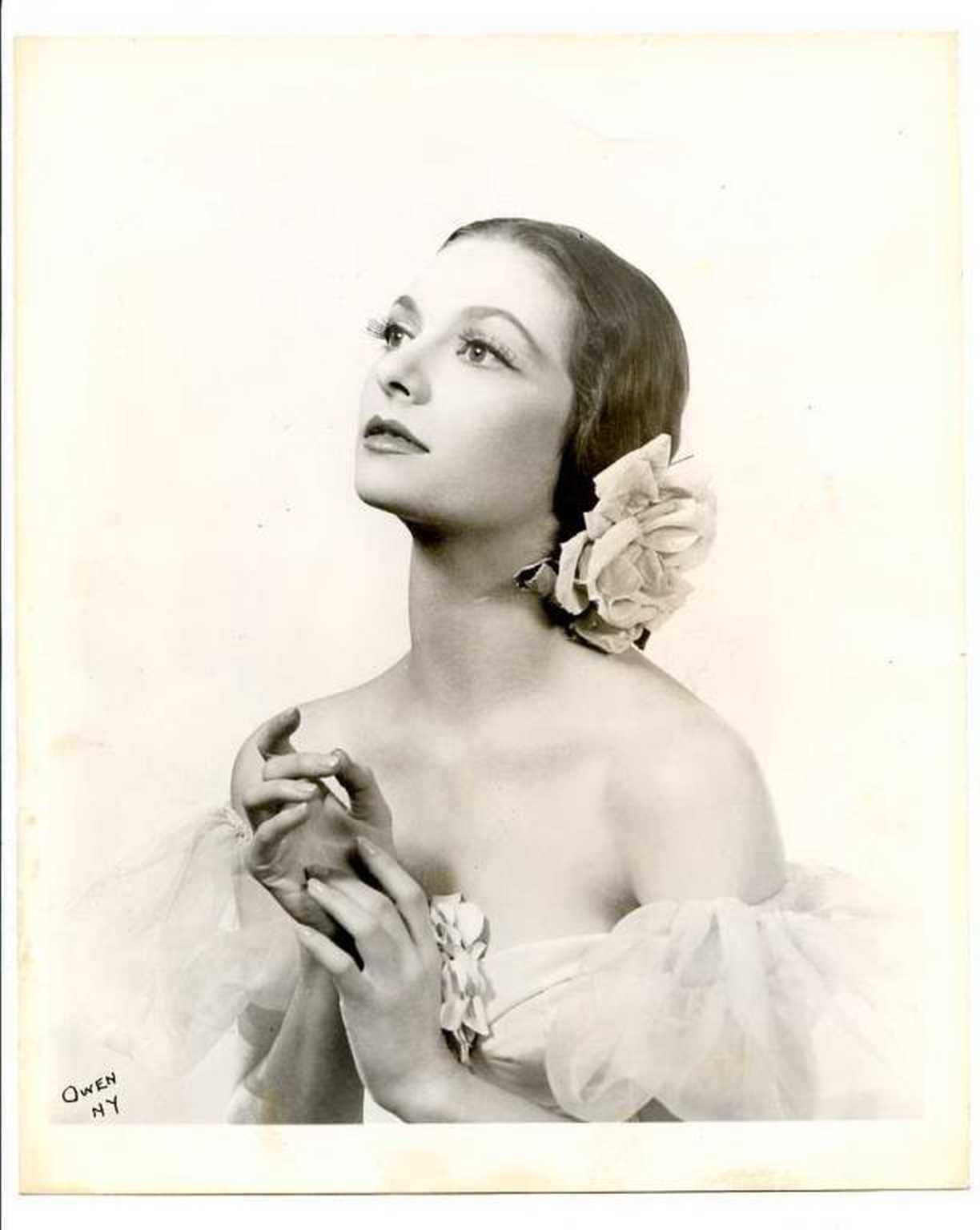
- Moylan for the Ballet Russe de Monte Carlo in 1949
- Born: August 24, 1925; Cincinnati, Ohio, U.S.
- Died: April 28, 2020 (aged 94); Redmond, Washington, U.S.
- Education: School of American Ballet
- Occupation: ballet dancer
- Years active: 1942–1957
- Spouse: Robert Stanley Bailes (m. 1957; died 1962) Read Taylor Hanks (died)
- Children: 1

Mary Ellen Moylan (August 24, 1925 – April 28, 2020) was an American ballet dancer. She was one of the first students of George Balanchine's School of American Ballet, and made her New York stage debut in 1942. She had danced with Ballet Russe de Monte Carlo, Ballet Society, Ballet Theatre (now American Ballet Theatre), Metropolitan Opera Ballet, and on Broadway. She was best known for performing Balanchine's works, and was described as "the first great Balanchine dancer". She retired from performing in 1957.

== Early life and training ==
Mary Ellen Moylan was born on August 24, 1925, in Cincinnati, Ohio, to an Irish builder father and schoolteacher mother. Due to the Great Depression, the family moved to St. Petersburg, Florida, in 1931, when she was six, to find work. Her mother sent her to a local ballet school.

When Moylan was eleven, her mother read about the School of American Ballet, newly founded by George Balanchine, from a magazine, and sent Moylan to the school. She first attended month-long summer sessions for two years. In 1940, at age 14, Moylan started attending the school full-time while living with her aunt in Manhattan. In her second year, after her father's death, she was offered a scholarship, which she called a "lifesaver". Her teachers included Balanchine, Pierre Vladimiroff, Muriel Stuart, Ludmilla Schollar, Felia Doubrovska, Anatole Oboukhoff and Anatole Vilzak.

== Ballet career ==
In 1942, at age 17, Moylan made her New York stage debut in a one-off Balanchine ballet Pas de Trois for Piano and Two Dancers, alongside Nicholas Magallanes for a Russian War Relief performance. The same year, the 17-year-old Moylan was cast in Strauss' operetta Rosalinda, choreographed by Balanchine, with her and José Limón as the principal dancers. At the same time, she was also chosen to dance the role originated by Marie-Jeanne in Balanchine's Ballet Imperial. During the several days Ballet Imperial was performed, she would dance in Ballet Imperial then take a taxi to another theatre to appear in the second act of Rosalinda. She recalled, "When a person so young and inexperienced is onstage in a situation like that, I don’t think they know enough to be as terrified as they should be." On her performance in Ballet Imperial, New York Times critic John Martin commented, "She is definitely a talented dancer who is worth watching." She performed in Rosalinda for a year.

In 1943, she joined Ballet Russe de Monte Carlo, where several of her schoolmates also joined. She took Balanchine's advice of signing a one-year contract instead of two years, and her salary was doubled in her second year. With the company, she appeared in Paquita, Giselle, Raymonda, Fokine's Les Sylphides and Nijinska's Etudes. She had also danced Balanchine's works with the company, including Concerto Barocco, Serenade, Le Bourgeois Gentilhomme and Danses concertantes. The latter was made on the company, with Moylan, Nicholas Magallanes and Maria Tallchief in the lead roles. The same year, Moylan, alongside Ballet Russe, performed Wright and Forrest's operetta Song of Norway for Los Angeles Civic Light Opera, with choreography by Balanchine, though Moylan missed some shows due to illness.

In 1946, Moylan left Ballet Russe to perform Alan Jay Lerner and Frederick Loewe's musical The Day Before Spring on Broadway, with choreography by Antony Tudor. Later that year, Balanchine and Lincoln Kirstein founded Ballet Society (the forerunner of New York City Ballet). She joined the troupe and created the role of Sanguinic in Balanchine's The Four Temperaments, which premiered during Ballet Society's first performance. Reviewing this performance, critic Edwin Denby concluded that among Ballet Society's roster, "Mary Ellen Moylan is its bold young ballerina." She and Francisco Moncion created the lead roles in Balanchine's Divertimento the following year, though she only danced it twice, and left Ballet Society the same year.

Having studied singing and acting, Moylan returned to Broadway in 1947, in Straus' The Chocolate Soldier, also choreographed by Balanchine, with her and Moncion as the lead dancers. Shortly after that, she met with Balanchine and Ballet Theatre (now American Ballet Theatre) co-director Oliver Smith, with Balanchine offering to create the lead role of Theme and Variations on her and Smith asking her to join the company. However, she declined both offers and chose to return to Ballet Russe, as she preferred to "dance all the big old roles." After her return, she made her debut in Swan Lake and The Nutcracker. However, she was still associated with Balanchine and often danced his works.

In 1950, due to changes in Ballet Russe, Moylan joined Ballet Theatre after approaching Lucia Chase. She soon left with the company for their European tour, and made her company debut in London. Her repertory with the company included lead roles in The Sleeping Beauty, Swan Lake, Giselle, Don Quixote pas de deux, Balanchine's Apollo, Theme and Variations, Tudor's Jardin aux Lilas and Petit's Les Demoiselles de la Nui.

In 1955, she joined the Metropolitan Opera Ballet, as she found dealing with her ankle injury while touring with Ballet Theatre difficult. She originated roles in Solov's Soirée and other opera ballets. She performed in another operetta in 1957, in a new staging of Lehár's The Merry Widow choreographed by Balanchine. She retired later that year, after she got married.

Moylan was associated with Balanchine throughout her career, and was featured in the 1989 documentary Dancing for Mr. B: Six Balanchine Ballerinas, where fellow dancer Maria Tallchief called her "the first great Balanchine dancer."

== Post-ballet and personal life ==
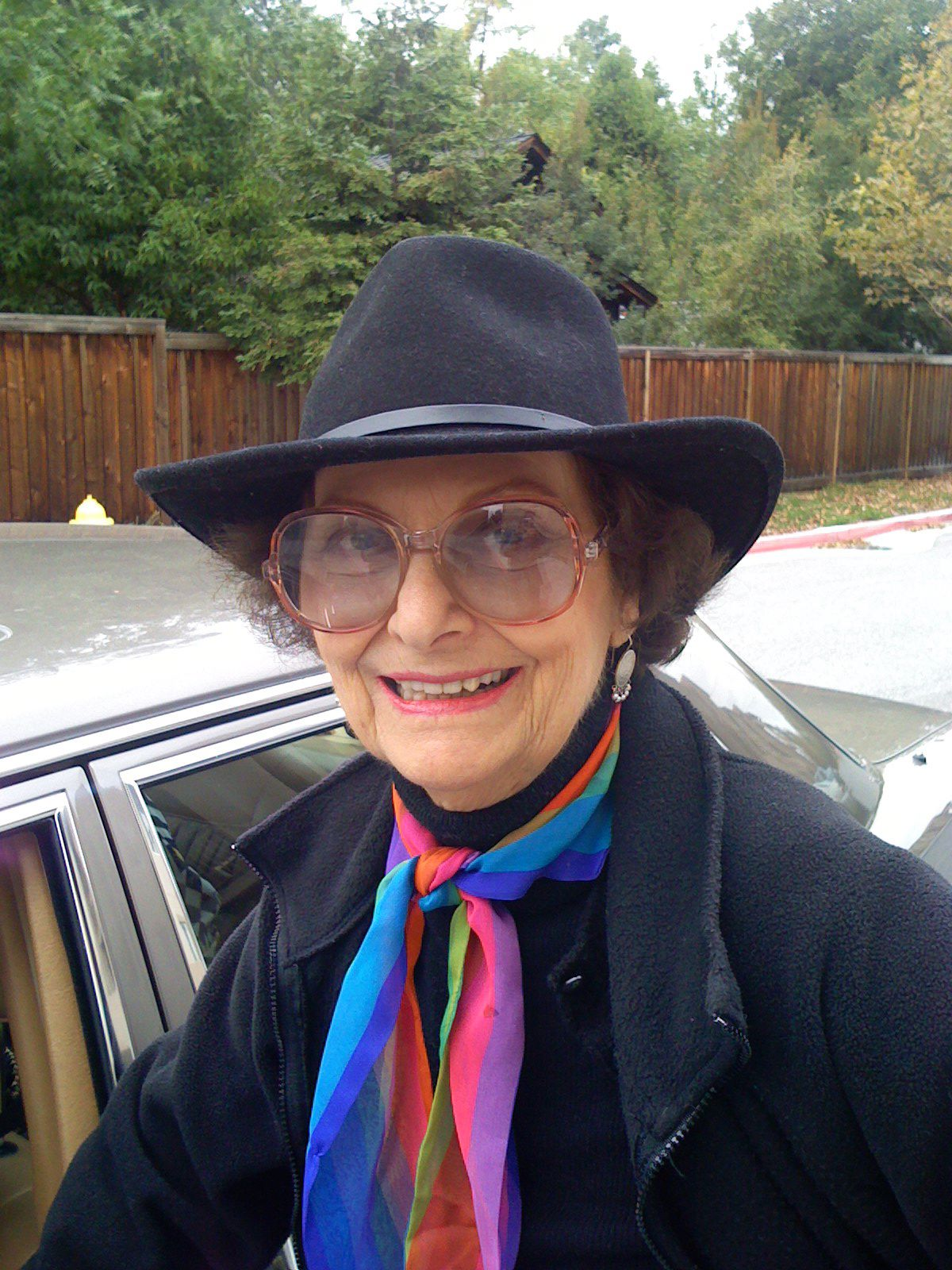
Mary Ellen Moylan in 2007

In 1957, Moylan married Robert Stanley Bailes, a singer. They had a son and owned a hamburger stand in Costa Mesa, California. Bailes died in 1962 from diabetes. Her second husband, accountant Read Taylor Hanks, died from a heart attack a few years later. Her third marriage ended in an annulment in 1968. Then, she moved to Pleasant Valley, New York, and worked at Bennett College as a ballet teacher, purchasing agent and campus shop manager. After retiring from Bennett, she became interested in watercolor painting and held several exhibitions. She moved to San Jose, California, in 1996, and Washington State in 2007. Moylan died on April 28, 2020, in Redmond, Washington, aged 94.
