= Nicholas Magallanes =

Mexican-American ballet dancer

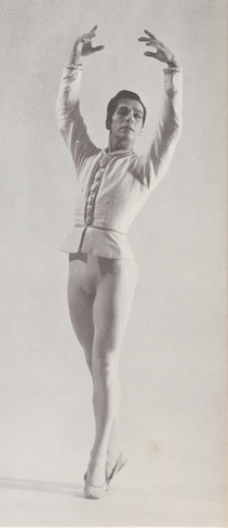
- Magallanes performing The Nutcracker (1954)
- Born: May 31, 1919; Santa Rosalia de Camargo, Chihuahua, Mexico
- Died: May 2, 1977 (aged 57); North Merrick, Long Island, New York, U.S.
- Occupation: Ballet dancer
- Years active: 1939–1976

External videos
- You may watch Nicholas Magallanes dancing the role of "The Shepherd" in Gian Carlo Menotti's opera Amahl and the Night Visitors in 1951 here

Nicholas Magallanes (May 31, 1919 – May 2, 1977) was a Mexican-born American principal dancer and charter member of the New York City Ballet. Along with Francisco Moncion, Maria Tallchief, and Tanaquil Le Clercq, Magallanes was among the core group of dancers with which George Balanchine and Lincoln Kirstein formed Ballet Society, the immediate predecessor of the New York City Ballet.

== Early life and training ==
Magallanes was born in Santa Rosalia de Camargo, now known as Camargo City, in the eastern part of the Mexican state of Chihuahua. He moved with his parents to the United States when he was five years old, first to New Jersey and then to the Lower East Side of New York City. When he was sixteen years old, he was spotted at the New York Boys' Club on East Tenth Street by Pavel Tchelitchev, who recommended him to Lincoln Kirstein as a scholarship student at the fledgling School of American Ballet. A handsome youth, with dark Latin looks and a strong, muscular physique, he auditioned for Balanchine and was accepted into the school in 1938. Under the tutelage of Balanchine and Pierre Vladimiroff, he soon began to show promise as a performer. He first appeared on stage in American Ballet Caravan's production of A Thousand Times Neigh, a tribute to the automobile, at the Ford pavilion at the 1939 New York World's Fair. Thus began his lifelong association with the enterprises of Balanchine and Kirstein.

== Career ==
In 1940, Magallanes danced briefly with the Littlefield Ballet, directed by Catherine Littlefield, and toured South America the following year with American Ballet Caravan. Back in the States, he appeared on Broadway in Balanchine's dances in two musical shows, The Merry Widow (1943) and Song of Norway (1944). On Broadway he also appeared in Ruth Page's dances in Music in My Heart (1947). Earlier in the decade he performed in La Vie Parisienne (1942) to the music of Jacques Offenbach. He then danced with Ballet Russe de Monte Carlo (1943–1946), when Balanchine was ballet master. During this time he collaborated with Balanchine to create several roles including: The Poet in La sonnambula (The Night Shadow), Cleónete in Le Bourgeois Gentilhomme and Jean de Brienne in Raymonda. Subsequently, he danced with Balanchine's Ballet Society (1946–1948). From 1948 until shortly before his death in 1977, he was a principal dancer with the New York City Ballet.

=== Roles created ===
This is a selected list. Choreography is by George Balanchine unless otherwise noted. The primary source of information is The Balanchine Catalogue.

- 1941. Ballet Imperial, later called Tchaikovsky Piano Concerto No. 2.. Role: soloist.
- 1944. Danses concertantes. Music by Igor Stravinsky. Role: Pas de trois with Maria Tallchief and Mary Ellen Moylan.
- 1944. Le Bourgeois Gentilhomme. Music by Richard Strauss. Role: Cléonte.
- 1946. The Night Shadow, also called La Sonnambula. Music by Vittorio Rieti, based on themes by Vincenzo Bellini. Role: The Poet.
- 1946. Raymonda. Ballet in Three Acts. Choreography by Balanchine and Alexandra Danilova, after Marius Petipa. Music by Alexander Glazunov. Role: Jean de Brienne.
- 1948. Symphony in C. Music by Georges Bizet. Role: First movement, a pas de deux with Maria Tallchief and ensemble.
- 1948. The Triumph of Bacchus and Ariadne. Ballet-Cantata. Music by Vittorio Rieti. Role: Bacchus.
- 1948. Orpheus. Ballet in three Scenes. Music by Igor Stravinsky. Role: Orpheus.
- 1949. Bourrée Fantasque. Music by Emmanuel Chabrier. Role: Prélude, a pas de deux with Maria Tallchief and ensemble.
- 1950. The Fairy's Kiss, also called Le Baiser de la Fée. Ballet Allegory in four Scenes. Music by Igor Stravinsky. Role: The Bridegroom.
- 1950. Sylvia: Pas de Deux. Music by Léo Delibes. Role, Cavalier, to Maria Tallchief.
- 1950. Illuminations. Choreography by Frederick Ashton. Music by Benjamin Britten. Role: The Poet (Arthur Rimbaud).
- 1951. La Valse. Music by Maurice Ravel. Role: Eighth waltz, with Tanaquil Le Clercq.
- 1951. The Cage. Choreography by Jerome Robbins. Music by Igor Stravinsky. Role: The Second Intruder.
- 1951. The Pied Piper. Choreography by Jerome Robbins. Music by Aaron Copland. Role: principal dancer.
- 1951. Amahl and the Night Visitors. Opera in One Act for Television. Choreography by John Butler. Music by Gian Carlo Menotti Role: A Dancing Shepherd.
- 1954. Opus 34. Music by Arnold Schoenberg. Role: The First Time, with Diana Adams, Patricia Wilde, and Francisco Moncion.
- 1954. The Nutcracker. Classical Ballet in Two Acts, Four Scenes, and Prologue. Music by Pyotr Ilyich Tchaikovsky. Role: Cavalier to the Sugar Plum Fairy, danced by Maria Tallchief.

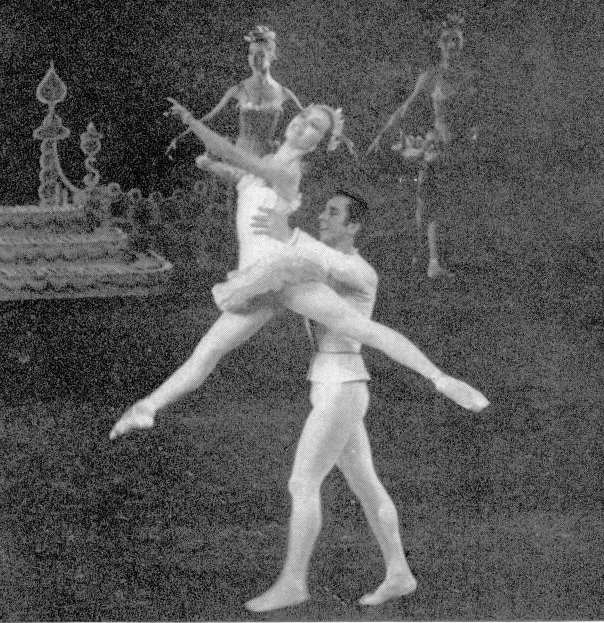
Magallanes and Tallchief in The Nutcracker 1954 lift

- 1954. Western Symphony. Music by Hershy Kay. Role: Second movement, with Janet Reed and ensemble.
- 1956. Allegro Brillante. Music by Pyotr Ilyich Tchaikovsky. Role: principal dancer, with Maria Tallchief.
- 1956. Divertimento No. 15. Music by Wolfgang Amadeus Mozart. Role: principal dancer. Allegro, and fifth variation.
- 1956. The Unicorn, the Gorgon, and the Manticore. Choreography by John Butler. Music by Gian Carlo Menotti. Role: The Poet.
- 1957. Square Dance. Music by Antonio Vivaldi. Role: principal dancer, with Patricia Wilde and ensemble.
- 1959. Episodes. Music by Anton von Webern. Rule: principal dancer, with Allegra Kent and ensemble.
- 1960. The Figure in the Carpet. Ballet in Five Scenes. Music by George Friedrich Handel. Role: The Duke of L'an L'ing.
- 1960. Liebeslieder Walzer. Ballet in Two Parts. Music by Johannes Brahms. Role: principal dancer, with Violette Verdy.
- 1962. A Midsummer Night's Dream. Ballet in Two Acts and Six Scenes. Music by Felix Mendelssohn. Role: Lysander.
- 1965. Don Quixote. Ballet in three Acts. Music by Nicolas Nabokov. Role: Duke.

=== Other roles ===
Besides the many original roles that he created, Magallanes danced in almost every ballet in the New York City Ballet repertory. He was closely associated with Balanchine's Serenade, Concerto Barocco, Symphony in C, and The Four Temperaments. Along with Orpheus, with Magallanes in the title role, Concerto Barocco and Symphony in C were on the program of the inaugural performance of the New York City Ballet on October 11, 1948 at the New York City Center of Music and Drama. After almost thirty years, his last appearance with the company was in 1976, in the mime role of Don Quixote in Balanchine's ballet of the same name (Don Quixote).

=== Television and film ===
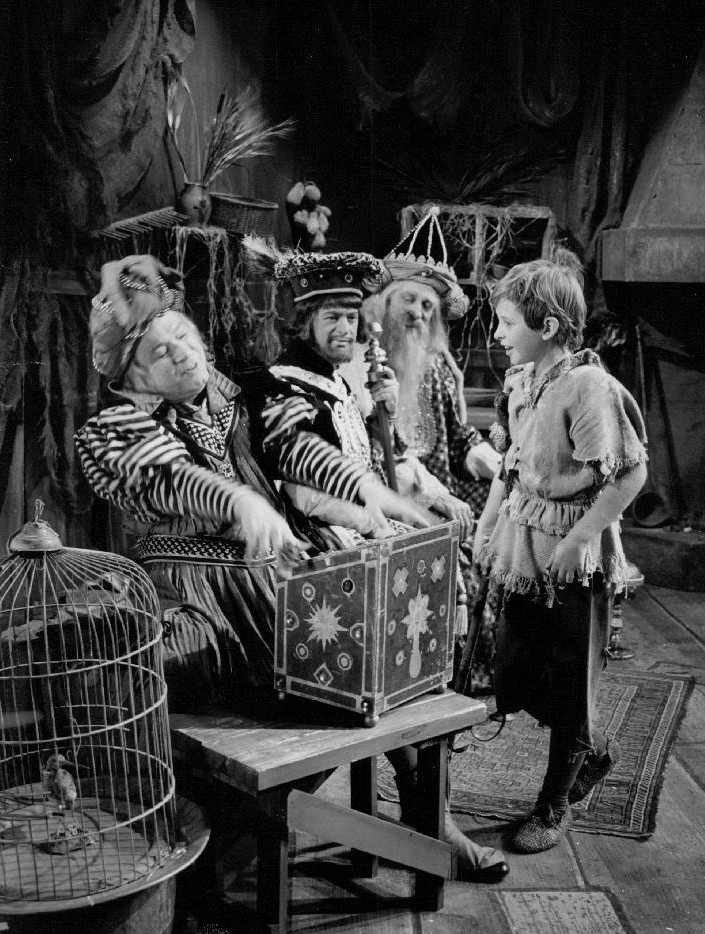
Three Kings and Amahl, Amahl and the Night Visitors, 1958

In 1951 Magallanes appeared with Tanaquil Le Clercq in the CBS TV special Premier. He also danced in the live premier of the first opera composed for television in America – Amahl and the Night Visitors on the debut of the Hallmark Hall of Fame show for the NBC network in the role of the Dancing Shepherd (1951). In later years he was also featured on several other broadcasts including: Camera Three for CBS as Prince Siegfried in Swan Lake (1956), Omnibus in A Midwinter Night's Dream (1961) and episodes of The Bell Telephone Hour for NBC (1962–1964). His performances on film included a collaboration with Tanaquil Le Clercq dancing La Valse (1951) and with Louis Falco in a production of Dionysus in the role of Pentheus (1963). In 1967 he also collaborated with Suzanne Farrell, Edward Villella and Francisco Moncion in Balanchine's A Midsummer Night's Dream dancing the role of Lysander.

=== Technique and style ===
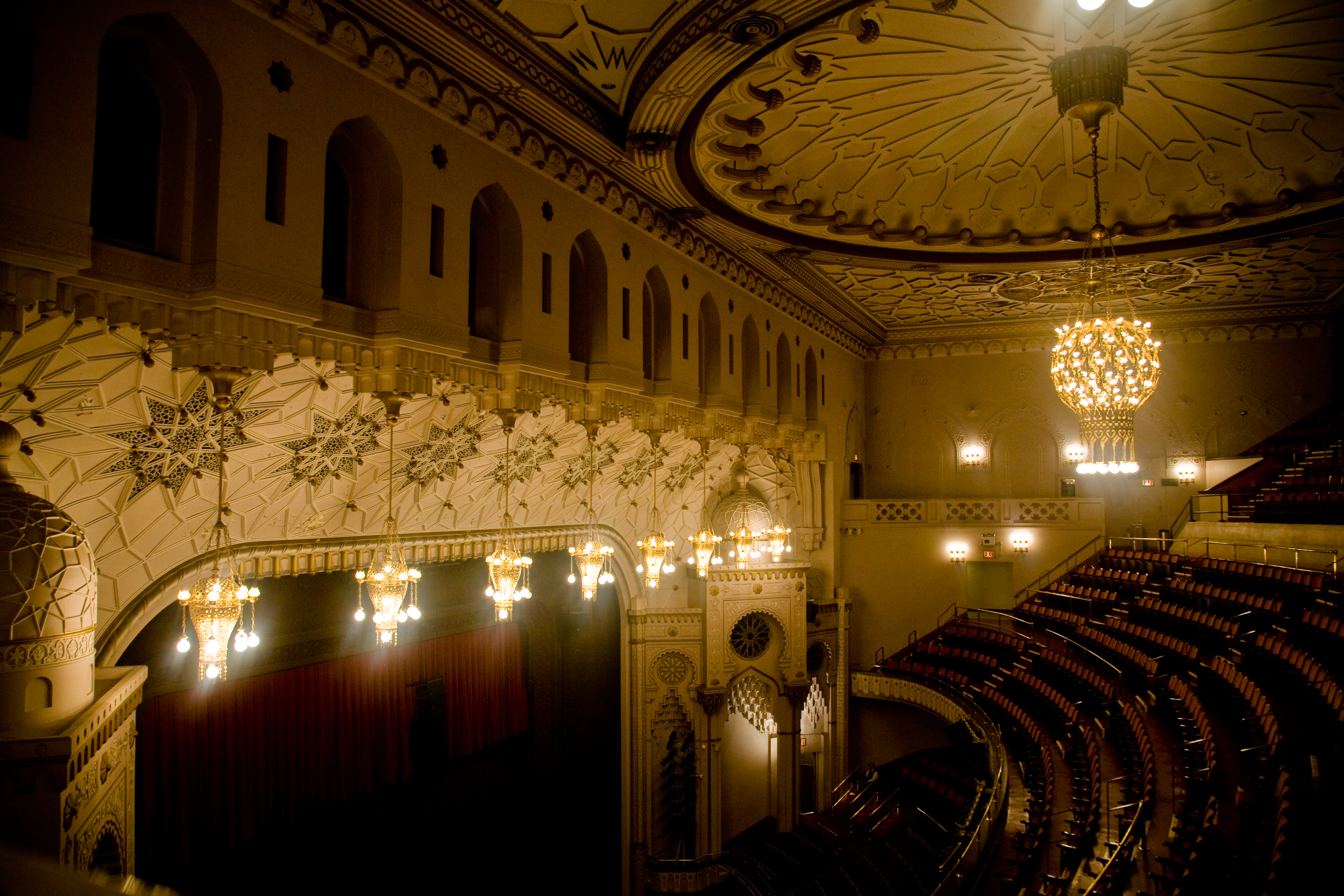
New York City Center NYC Center auditorium 2008

Magallanes was often paired with Maria Tallchief. In one instance, he saved the opening night performance of Balanchine's elaborate production of The Nutcracker on February 2, 1954. Balanchine had choreographed the grand pas de deux for Tallchief and André Eglevsky, but at the eleventh hour Eglevsky injured his ankle and was unable to perform. With no understudy on standby, Magallanes learned the technically challenging part in one day's rehearsal and danced the Cavalier of the Sugar Plum Fairy.

Magallanes embodied the Balanchinian archetype with the melancholy heroes of Serenade, La Valse, and La Sonnambula. He performed Orpheus, opposite Francisco Moncion as the Dark Angel and Tallchief as Eurydice. A set of photographs of the trio by George Platt Lynes suggests the drama of their interrelationships.

== Death ==
Magallanes died of lung cancer at his home in North Merrick, Long Island at the age of 57.

== Legacy ==
In 2013, Magallanes figured as a character in Nikolai and the Others, a play by Richard Nelson produced by the Lincoln Center Theater and presented at the Mitzi E. Newhouse Theater in New York. Depicting a gathering of Russian éemigré artists in the 1940s, the play includes a scene in which Balanchine choreographs Orpheus on Magallanes and Tallchief as Stravinsky looks on. Magallanes and Tallchief were played by Michael Rosen and Natalia Alonso; Balanchine was portrayed by Michael Cerveris. The play had a short run and was not a critical success.
