= Philip Neal =

Former principal dancer

Philip H Neal (born in Richmond, Virginia) is a former principal dancer with New York City Ballet.

== Career ==
He studied from age 11 at the Richmond Ballet School. After studying there, Edward Villella arranged a summer scholarship for him at NCYB's School of American Ballet. In 1985 Philip won the silver medal at the Prix de Lausanne ballet competition.

The following year Neal graduated magna cum laude from St. Paul's School and was a National Foundation for Advancement in the Arts' Presidential Scholar of the Arts and as a consequence performed at Kennedy Center in Washington, D.C. He subsequently enrolled full-time at SAB and also trained at the Royal Danish Ballet School in Copenhagen, joining NYCB's corps de ballet in 1987.

Four years later Neal was promoted to soloist and at the end of the 1992–1993 winter season to principal dancer. Neal's farewell performance took place Sunday, June 13, 2010, and consisted of ballets by George Balanchine.

== Originated roles ==
=== Peter Martins ===
- Guide to Strange Places
- Todo Buenos Aires

=== Kevin O'Day ===
- Swerve Poems

== Featured roles ==
=== George Balanchine ===
- Allegro Brillante
- Ballade
- Chaconne
- Cortège Hongrois
- The Nutcracker
- Divertimento No. 15
- Jewels Diamonds
- A Midsummer Night's Dream
- Mozartiana
- Robert Schumann’s Davidsbündlertänze
- Serenade
- Slaughter on Tenth Avenue
- Swan Lake
- Tschaikovsky Pas de Deux
- Tschaikovsky Piano Concerto No. 2
- Western Symphony
- Who Cares?

=== Ulysses Dove ===
- Red Angels

=== Boris Eifman ===
- Musagète

=== Peter Martins ===
- Black And White
- Ecstatic Orange
- Fearful Symmetries
- Les Gentilhommes
- The Sleeping Beauty Prince Désiré
- Songs of the Auvergne
- Swan Lake Prince Siegfried
- The Waltz Project

=== Jerome Robbins ===
- Brandenburg
- Dances at a Gathering
- The Four Seasons Spring
- Glass Pieces
- The Goldberg Variations
- I'm Old Fashioned
- In G Major
- Interplay

=== Richard Tanner ===
- Ancient Airs and Dances

== Television ==
- PBS Live from Lincoln Center, New York City Ballet's Diamond Project: Ten Years of New Choreography, 2002, Ancient Airs and Dances
- PBS Live from Lincoln Center, Lincoln Center Celebrates Balanchine 100, 2004, Liebeslieder Walzer

== Footnotes ==
=== Sources ===
- New NGB Artistic Director and Dance Department Chair Philip Neal Brings Legacy of Jerome Robbins and George Balanchine
- A.A. Cristi Philip Neal Joins as Artistic Assistant Director (2025) BroadwayWorld
- Artistic Assistant Director Philip Neal Biography (Biography) Boston Ballet
- Philip Neal Interviews
