= Annabelle Lyon =

American ballerina

Annabelle Lyon (New York City, January 8, 1916 – November 4, 2011, Mansfield, Massachusetts) was an American ballerina. She was a principal dancer with American Ballet Theatre.

She was raised in Memphis, where her father Max ran a chain of grocery stores. She took her first ballet lessons there and, showing talent, received a scholarship to Michel Fokine's school in New York and lived with relatives in Brooklyn.

Lyon was a member of George Balanchine’s American Ballet, founded by Lincoln Kirstein in 1936, and danced in the original casts of Le baiser de la fée, Jeu de cartes and Serenade. Three years later she was one of the original dancers of Ballet Theatre, now known as American Ballet Theatre. On January 12, 1940, she was the company's first Giselle, partnered by Anton Dolin. The next year, on October 31, she danced her former teacher Fokine's Le Spectre de la Rose; she and her partner Ian Gibson were the last dancers taught the rôles by the choreographer.

Her repertory included classical as well as contemporary works by the company's founders Antony Tudor and Agnes de Mille; de Mille's 1941 Three Virgins and a Devil (as The Lustful One), Tudor's 1942 Pillar of Fire. On May 12, 1947, she danced with Jerome Robbins in the premiere of his Summer Day at New York City Center.

Leaving Ballet Theater, Lyon danced on Broadway in Carousel (1945–47) and in Juno (1959), both choreographed by de Mille. She married businessman Julius Borah in 1946; they had a son.
