= Francisco Monción =

Dominican-American ballet dancer

Francisco Moncion
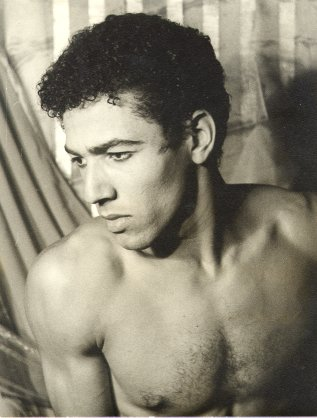
- Photo of Moncion by Carl Van Vechten (1947)
- Born: July 6, 1918; La Vega, Dominican Republic
- Died: April 1, 1995 (aged 76); Woodstock, New York, US
- Occupations: Danseur, choreographer
- Years active: 1942–1983

Francisco Monción (July 6, 1918 – April 1, 1995) was a Dominican-born American ballet dancer and choreographer who was a charter member of the New York City Ballet. Over the course of his long career, spanning some forty years, he created roles in major works by George Balanchine, Jerome Robbins, and others. He was also an amateur painter.

== Early life and training ==
Francisco Monción was born in Concepción de la Vega, a large city in La Vega province in the center of the Dominican Republic. His family immigrated to the United States in 1922 or 1923, when he was four years old. He did not begin dance training until he was twenty, and then it was almost by accident. In 1938, he was offered a scholarship to the recently established School of American Ballet, then engaged in recruiting male students. He accepted the offer and soon found himself in technique classes with Balanchine, Pierre Vladimiroff, and Anatole Oboukoff, undergoing the strict discipline of the Russian school of classical ballet. In 1942, while still a student, he appeared in the ensemble of Balanchine's Ballet Imperial in a production by the New Opera Company at the Majestic Theater in New York. However, as World War II was raging in Europe, he postponed his thoughts of becoming a professional dancer and enlisted in the U.S. Army. After two years of military service, he was discharged, whereupon he returned to New York and began his theatrical career.

== Professional career ==
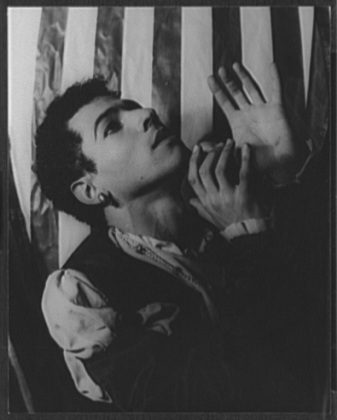
Portrait of Francisco Monción, in Sebastian

Monción's first engagement as a professional dancer was as a "gypsy" in a Broadway revival of The Merry Widow, Franz Lehár's famous operetta, with dances choreographed by Balanchine. When this show closed, in May 1944, he joined the marquis de Cuevas's Ballet International as a principal, creating the title roles in two major productions later that year: Edward Caton's Sebastian and Léonide Massine's Mad Tristan, a Surrealist work with spectacular designs by Salvador Dalí. Of the latter, critic Edwin Denby wrote, "Besides Dalí, there was one other hero Friday night, Francisco Monción, who took the part of Tristan. He carried off the most acrobatically strenuous part without a flaw, and more than that he projected the character and the story convincingly. He is a very fine dancer indeed, and a quite exceptionally imaginative one."

Following this engagement, Monción performed briefly with Colonel de Basil's Original Ballet Russe during the early months of the 1946/47 season. Back in New York, he became an original member of Ballet Society, formed by Balanchine and Lincoln Kirstein in 1947, and later of its successor, the New York City Ballet. During the four decades that he spent in these companies, he created a number of important roles and participated in many historic performances. At the first performance of the New York City Ballet on October 11, 1948, he danced in all three ballets on the program: Concerto Barocco, Orpheus, and Symphony in C. Decades later, during the troupe's 20th anniversary season, he appeared in the premier of Jacques d'Amboise's Tchaikovsky Suite No. 2 in collaboration with Robert Irving and John Serry Sr.

=== Roles created ===
This is a selected list. Choreography is by George Balanchine unless otherwise noted. Principal source of information is The Balanchine Catalogue.

- 1944. Sebastian. Choreography by Edward Caton. Music by Gian Carlo Menotti. Role: Sebastian, opposite Viola Essen.
- 1944. Mad Tristan. Choreography by Léonide Massine. Music by Richard Wagner. Role: Tristan.
- 1946. The Four Temperaments. Music by Paul Hindemith. Role: Theme 3, with Gisella Caccialanza. This was at the first performance of Ballet Society.
- 1947. Divertimento. Music by Alexei Haieff. Role: leading dancer, with Mary Ellen Moylan.
- 1948. The Triumph of Bacchus and Ariadne. Ballet-Cantata. Music by Vittorio Rieti. Role: Midas.
- 1948. Concerto Barocco. Music by Johann Sebastian Bach. Role: principal dancer, with Marie-Jeanne and Ruth Gilbert.

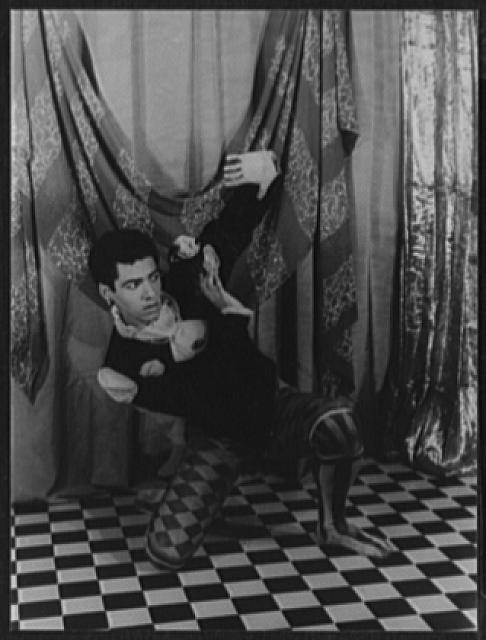
Portrait of Francisco Monción, in Sebastian

- 1948. Orpheus. Ballet in Three Scenes. Music by Igor Stravinsky. Role: Dark Angel, with Nicholas Magallanes as Orpheus and Maria Tallchief as Eurydice.
- 1948. Symphony in C. Music by Georges Bizet. Role: second movement, Adagio, with Tanaquil Le Clercq.
- 1949. Firebird. Music by Igor Stravinsky. Role: Prince Ivan, with Maria Tallchief as the Firebird.
- 1949. Jinx. Choreography by Lew Christensen. Music by Benjamin Britten. Role: principal dancer, with Janet Reed.
- 1950. The Age of Anxiety. Choreography by Jerome Robbins. Music by Leonard Bernstein. Role: principal dancer, with Tanaquil Le Clercq.
- 1951. La Valse. Music by Maurice Ravel. Role: Death.
- 1952. Picnic at Tintagel. Choreography by Frederick Ashton, Music by Arnold Bax. Role: The Husband (King Mark), with Diana Adams as The Wife (Iseult).
- 1953. Afternoon of a Faun. Choreography by Jerome Robbins. Music by Claude Debussy. Role: The Boy, with Tanaquil Le Clercq as the Girl.
- 1954. Opus 34. Music by Arnold Schoenberg. Role: The First Time, with Patricia Wilde.
- 1954. The Nutcracker. Classical Ballet in Two Acts, Four Scenes, and Prologue. Music by Pyotr Ilyich Tchaikovsky. Role: Coffee (Arabian Dance).
- 1954. Ivesiana. Music by Charles Ives. Role: Central Park in the Dark, with Janet Reed.
- 1959. Episodes. Music by Anton von Webern. Role: Ricercata, with Melissa Hayden.
- 1960. The Figure in the Carpet. Ballet in Five Scenes. Music by George Frideric Handel. Role: The Duke of Grenada.
- 1962. A Midsummer Night's Dream. Ballet in Two Acts and Six Scenes. Music by Felix Mendelssohn. Role: Theseus, Duke of Athens.
- 1965. Don Quixote. Ballet in Three Acts. Music by Nicolas Nabokov. Role: Merlin.
- 1967. Jewels, part 1, Emeralds. Music by Gabriel Fauré. Role: second lead dancer, with Mimi Paul.
- 1970. In the Night. Choreography by Jerome Robbins. Music by Frédéric Chopin. Role: principal dancer, with Patricia McBride.
- 1972. Pulcinella. Choreography by Balanchine and Jerome Robbins. Music by Igor Stravinsky. Role: Devil.
- 1982. Noah and the Flood. Choreography by Balanchine and Jacques d'Amboise. Music by Igor Stravinsky. Role: principal dancer.

=== Artistic diversity ===
Early in his career, it was apparent that Monción was unlikely to become a true danseur noble. It was questionable whether he had the elegance of bearing and refinement required for princely roles. Yet it was clear that he was capable of effective portrayals in many different roles as a premier danseur. He was a dashing figure in the Balanchine dances for the Broadway production of The Chocolate Soldier (1947), dancing with Mary Ellen Moylan. He was a tender partner to Tanaquil Le Clercq in Jerome Robbins's meditative Afternoon of a Faun (1953), bringing a sensual languor to the part. He was dramatically powerful in the title role of Balanchine's Prodigal Son, charmed by Yvonne Mounsey and then contrite as he painfully made his way home to his father. In contrast, he was funny as The Husband in Robbins's The Concert, smoking his cigar and flitting about the stage to butterfly music. He was mysteriously compelling and beautiful in Orpheus, as the brooding Dark Angel, the role for which he is perhaps best remembered.

=== Choreographies ===
In the 1950s and 1960s, Monción experimented with choreographing works of his own. He made four for the New York City Ballet and two for other companies.

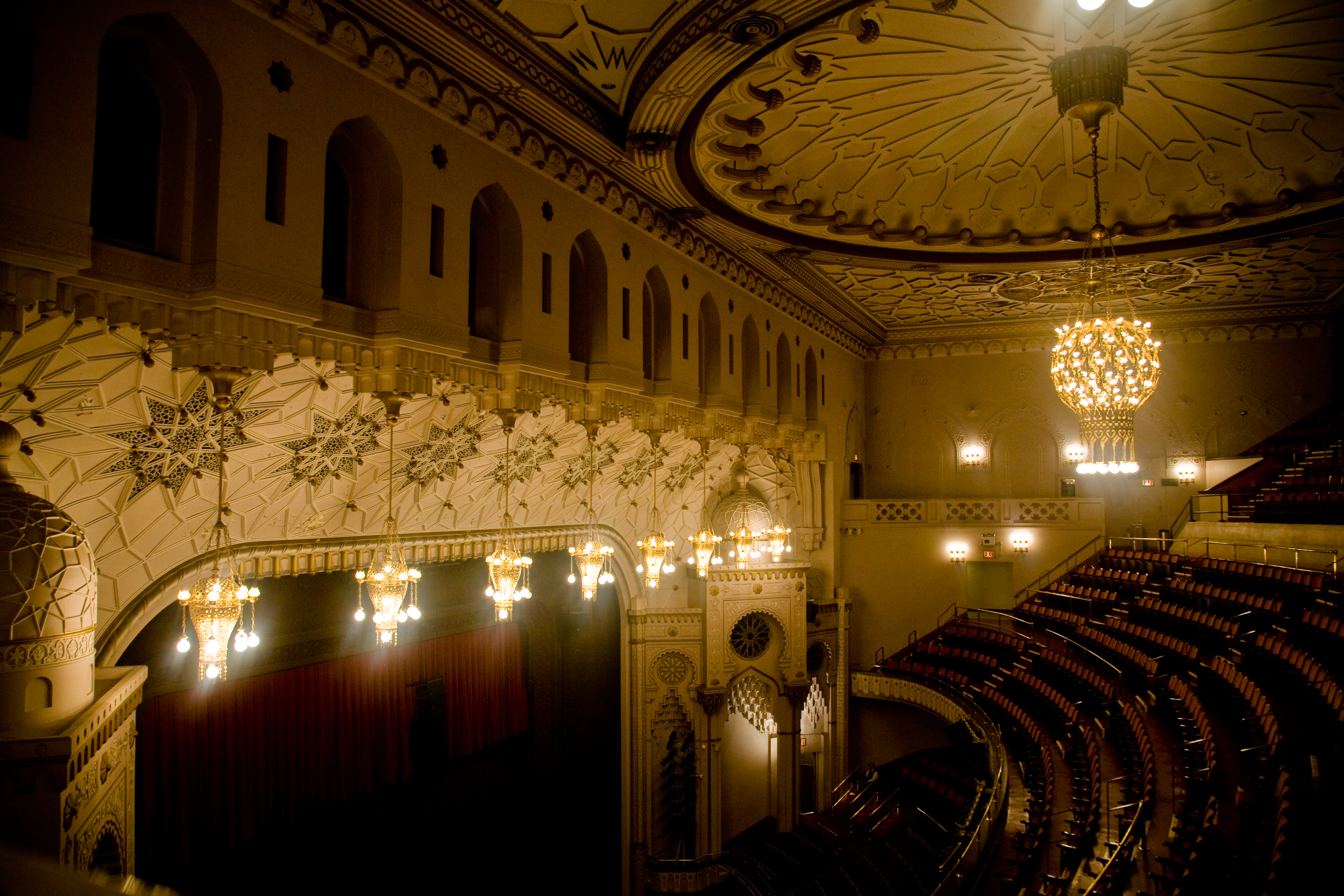
New York City Center NYC Center auditorium 2008

- 1955. Jeux d'Enfants. A collaborative work with Balanchine and Barbara Millberg. Music by Georges Bizet.
- 1957. Pastorale. Music by Charles Turner.
- 1959. Choros No. 7. Music by Heitor Villa-Lobos.
- 1960. Les Biches. Music by Francis Poulenc.
- 1965. Honegger Concertino. Music by Arthur Honegger. Created for the Pennsylvania Ballet.
- 1966. Night Song. Music by Harold Shapero. Created for the Washington Ballet.

== Personal life ==
Monción's surname is well known in the Dominican Republic, as his family is connected to General Benito Monción (1826–1898), an army officer of French descent who fought in the Dominican Restoration War. Monción's forebears certainly included Hispanics as well as French and likely black Africans as well. Most Dominicans are of mixed ethnic and racial backgrounds. In 1947, Francisco Monción became a citizen of the United States, where he was considered a Caribbean Latino for the rest of his life.

After his retirement from the stage in 1983, Monción spent his leisure years at his home in Woodstock, New York, indulging his considerable talent for oil painting. His works were shown in several New York exhibitions. He died of cancer at his home at the age of 76.

== See also ==
- New York City Ballet
- Maria Tallchief
- Tanaquil Le Clercq
- Nicholas Magallanes
