= Allegro Brillante =

Ballet by George Balanchine

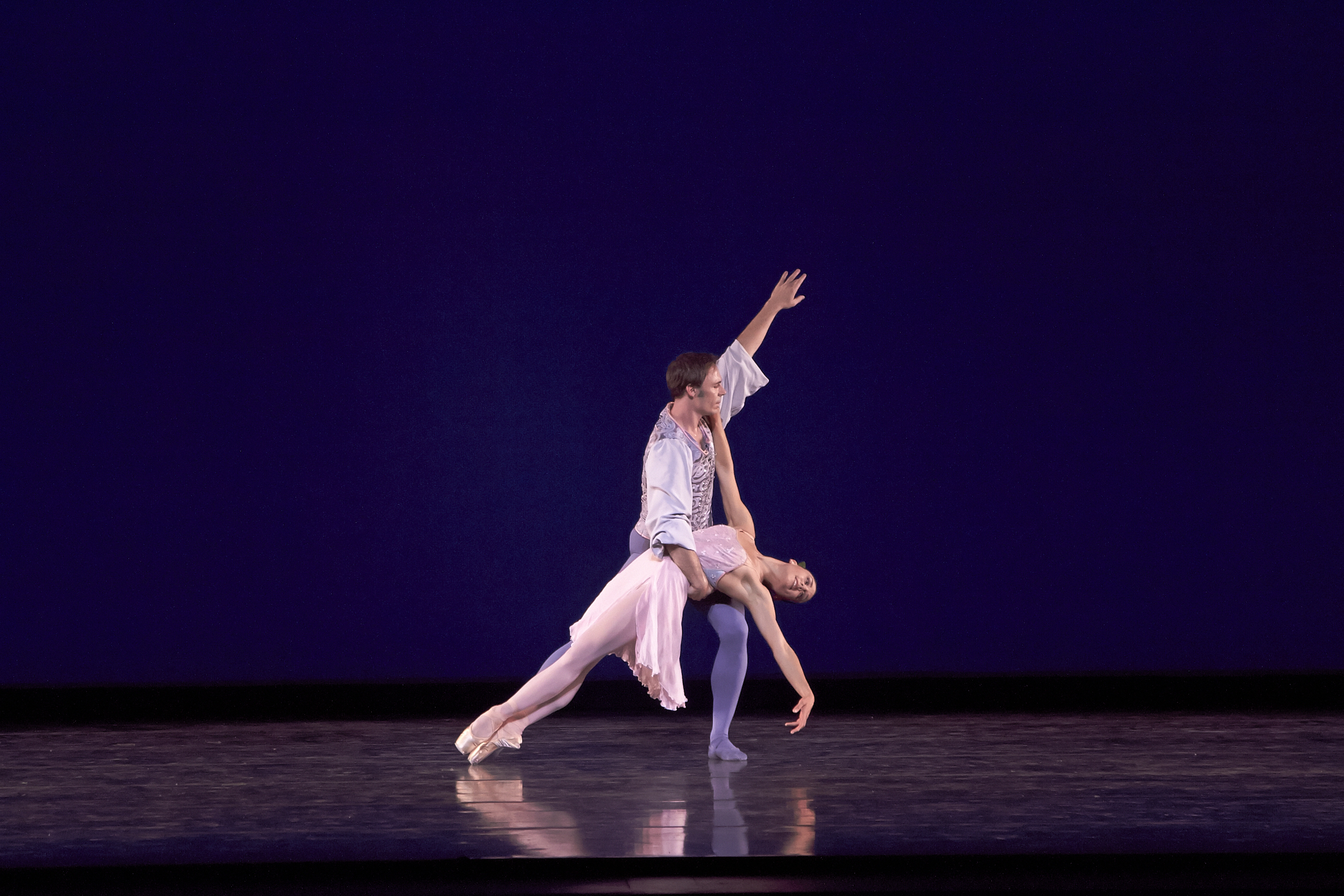
- Kansas City Ballet's Tempe Ostergren and Anthony Krutzkamp in Allegro Brillante
- Choreographer: George Balanchine
- Music: Pyotr Ilyich Tchaikovsky
- Premiere: March 1, 1956; City Center of Music and Drama
- Original ballet company: New York City Ballet
- Design: Karinska; Jean Rosenthal
- Created for: Maria Tallchief; Nicholas Magallanes
- Genre: Neoclassical ballet

Allegro Brillante is a ballet choreographed by George Balanchine to Tchaikovsky's Piano Concerto No. 3. The ballet is danced by a principal couple and a corps de ballet of eight. Balanchine said it "contains everything I knew about classical ballet." Allegro Brillante was made for the New York City Ballet, and premiered on March 1, 1956, at the City Center of Music and Drama, with Maria Tallchief and Nicholas Magallanes originating the two principal roles.

== Choreography ==
Allegro Brillante is danced by a lead couple and a small corps de ballet of eight. The ballet is set to Piano Concerto No. 3, which Balanchine found to be "brisk and declarative but is also deeply contemplative."

Balanchine said the ballet "contains everything I knew about classical ballet – in thirteen minutes." He also wrote, "I had no narrative idea for the work, only wishing to have the dancers complement the music as best I could." Maria Tallchief, who originated the lead ballerina role, noted both the ballet's "expansive Russian romanticism," and the fast speed of some of the choreography. Author Nancy Reynolds commented that the ballet "offers a chance for virtuoso display and is at the same time 'dancey' and flowing". She added that while the tempo of the score made the ballet seem "impossibly difficult", Balanchine strategically placed exits for the performers so most dancers find their roles easier.

The lead ballerina, according to Balanchine, "follows the piano in the cadenza", while her partner and the corps de ballet play the supporting role in conveying "what I hope is the spirit of the work." Dancer Violette Verdy described the lead role,

There's a lot of strong, broad dancing spaced in very little time. The gestures have to be big, ample, spacious, and they have to look free. Under all that freedom has to be control – the pirouettes, exactness, beats and turns, and, as always with him, the fast work. But if the ballerina is afraid that it will not produce enough of an effect by itself, if she feels she has to compensate by telling the audience that it is hard, a false drama is created. It should be left alone, and one should dance it with passion but with happiness. It's quintessentially Russian in its best possible meaning – a great, romantic, beautiful plastic piece.

== Original cast ==
- Maria Tallchief
- Nicholas Magallanes
- Carolyn George
- Barbara Fallis
- Barbara Milberg
- Barbara Walczak
- Arthur Mitchell
- Richard Rapp
- Jonathan Watts
- Roland Vasquez

== Production ==
Balanchine made Allegro Brillante at the last minute, after Jerome Robbins canceled the premiere of Suite from "The Guest", a revival of his earlier work, because his work on The Concert, another ballet slated to premiere in March 1956 was too time-consuming. Balanchine then decided to choreograph to Piano Concerto No. 3. The concerto was Tchaikovsky's last work, as he died less than a month after completing its first movement, Allegro Brillante. Balanchine had previously choreographed Ballet Imperial to Tchaikovsky's Piano Concerto No. 2.

The principal roles of the ballet were originated by Maria Tallchief and Nicholas Magallanes. The costumes were designed by Karinska. The original lighting was designed by Jean Rosenthal.

== Performances ==
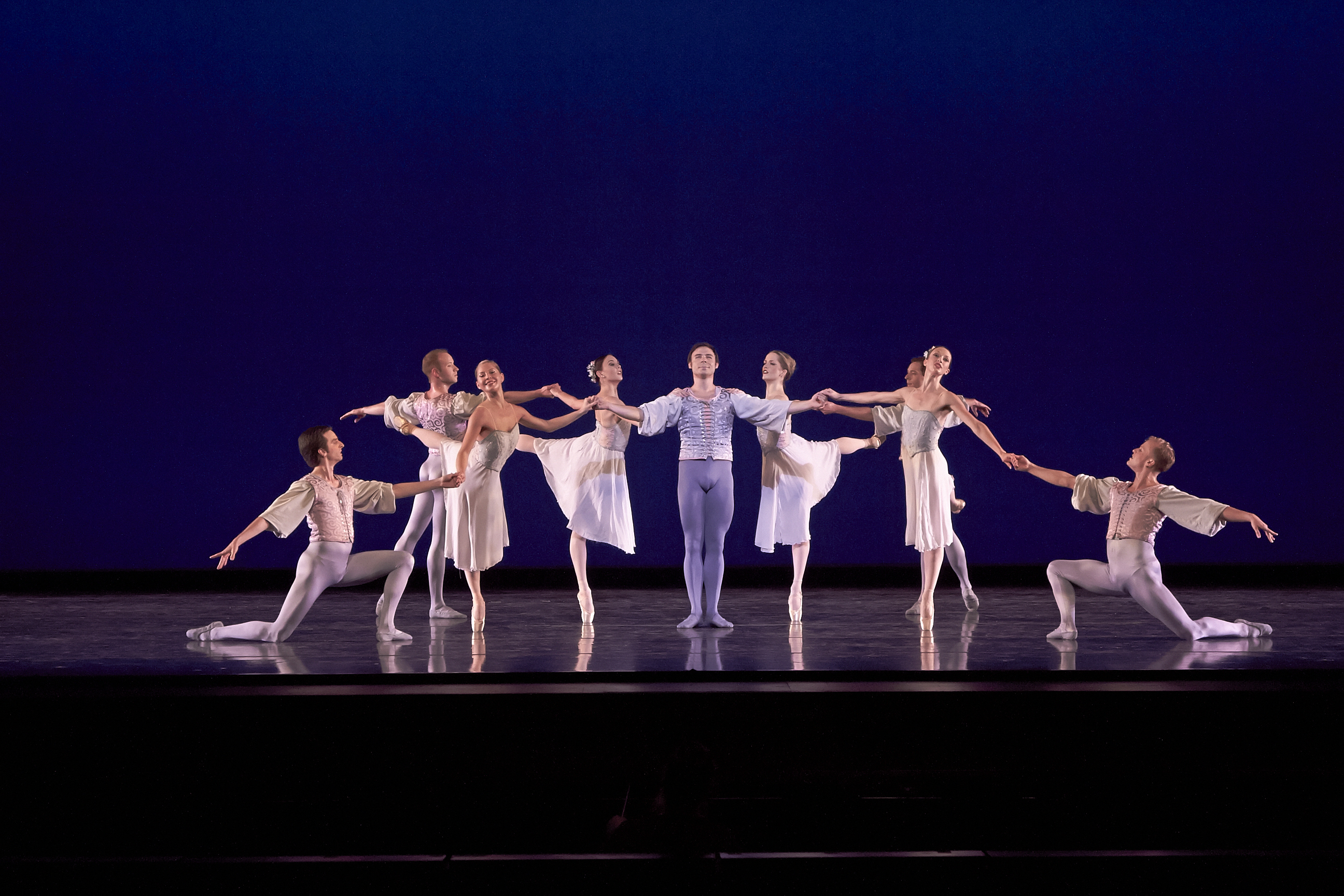
Kansas City Ballet dancers in Balanchine's Allegro Brillante

Allegro Brillante premiered on March 1, 1956, at the City Center of Music and Drama. Léon Barzin conducted while Nicholas Kopeikine played the piano. Despite being made as a last minute addition, the New York City Ballet performs Allegro Brillante regularly. Due to its small cast size and short length, the ballet is often placed in the middle of a mixed bill when performed.

Allegro Brillante has been performed by other ballet companies, including Sadler's Wells Royal Ballet, San Francisco Ballet, Royal New Zealand Ballet, Morphoses, American Ballet Theatre, Stuttgart Ballet, Les Grands Ballets Canadiens, National Ballet of Canada, Ballet BC, Royal Winnipeg Ballet, Miami City Ballet, Pennsylvania Ballet, Washington Ballet, Suzanne Farrell Ballet, Dance Theatre of Harlem, Kansas City Ballet, Ballet Arizona, BalletMet and Ballet West. Students of the School of American Ballet, the New York City Ballet's affiliated-school, has performed Allegro Brillante in its annual workshop performance.

== Critical reception ==
John Martin of the New York Times commented, "Whether the Balanchine work had been planned previously or was a short-notice assignment does not appear in the quality of the work itself, for though it is certainly not one of his masterpieces, it is put together with all his skills and authority. Its main handicap is its music, which is choreographically unevocative in the extreme."

== Videography ==
In 1979, a New York City Ballet performance of Allegro Brillante was televised on PBS's Great Performances. The performance was led by Suzanne Farrell and Peter Martins, and the corps de ballet consisted of Renee Estopinal, Lisa de Ribere, Marjorie Spohn, Heather Watts, Tracy Bennett, Stephen Caras, Victor Castelli and Joseph Duell.

In 2020, the New York City Ballet released an archival video of an Allegro Brillante online, as the first program of its digital season, after its repertory season had to be canceled due to the COVID-19 pandemic. The recording features Tiler Peck and Andrew Veyette, and was filmed in 2017.
