= Tschaikovsky Piano Concerto No. 2 (ballet) =

1941 ballet by George Balanchine

- Choreographer: George Balanchine
- Music: Pyotr Ilyich Tchaikovsky
- Premiere: June 25, 1941; Teatro Municipal
- Original ballet company: American Ballet Caravan
- Design: Mstislav Dobuzhinsky
- Created for: Marie-Jeanne; Gisella Caccialanza; William Dollar

Tschaikovsky Piano Concerto No. 2, (Note: Balanchine spelled the last name of the composer as "Tschaikovsky" rather than "Tchaikovsky", as the composer used the "Tschaikovsky" spelling during a visit to New York.) also titled Ballet Imperial, is a ballet choreographed by George Balanchine to Tchaikovsky's Piano Concerto No. 2. Ballet Imperial was choreographed for American Ballet Caravan's 1941 South American tour, and was aimed at showing that the Americans were capable of the classical ballet traditions. The ballet pays tribute to Tchaikovsky, the classical ballet choreographer Marius Petipa, and Imperial Saint Petersburg, where Balanchine received his ballet training. The ballet featured academic steps and alludes to Imperial Russia through the costumes and scenery. Ballet Imperial premiered on June 25, 1941, at Teatro Municipal, Rio de Janeiro.

In 1973, Balanchine, believing the audience no longer needed elaborate costumes and scenery to understand a ballet, removed all allusions to Imperial Russia and renamed it Tschaikovsky Piano Concerto No. 2, with the ballet now standing in relation to the music alone. The ballet has been performed by several ballet companies, including Balanchine's New York City Ballet, though some troupes still perform the ballet as Ballet Imperial, including American Ballet Theatre.

== Development ==
=== Ballet Imperial ===
In 1941, impresario Lincoln Kirstein was invited by his friend Nelson Rockefeller to organize a dance tour across South America subsidized by the US government. Rockefeller, who had been appointed Coordinator of Inter-American Affairs by President Franklin D. Roosevelt, was given a budget to build cultural and financial relations in South America amid World War II. Kirstein said he "was given a check which seemed so large that I was as scared as if I had stolen it." Kirstein brought in choreographer George Balanchine, and the two hurriedly formed the American Ballet Caravan, with dancers from their two previous troupes, American Ballet and Ballet Caravan. Most of the dancers had trained at the School of American Ballet under Balanchine.

Balanchine and Kirstein decided to present a work to show that Americans are capable of the classical ballet traditions. However, instead of reviving a classic such as Swan Lake or The Sleeping Beauty, Balanchine decided to choreograph a new work that would revitalize the classical tradition, using the vocabulary of Marius Petipa, "the father of the classic ballet." He also decided to make the ballet plotless to allow more time for dancing. Balanchine decided to use Tchaikovsky's Piano Concerto No. 2, the version abridged by Alexander Siloti. Though Petipa and Tchaikovsky had worked together, Petipa would not have used this type of music for dance as it was symphonic, not divided by numbers.

The original set and costumes were designed by Mstislav Dobuzhinsky. The backdrop showed a view of Neva river from the Winter Palace. The women are dressed in tutus, with the lead ballerina wearing a crown. Balanchine donated the Dobuzhinsky designs to the Museum of Modern Art, to help wartime arts programs in army camps. Ballet Imperial had subsequently been redesigned many times, by designers such as Eugene Berman, Carl Toms, Rouben Ter-Arutunian and Karinska, all inspired by Imperial Russia.

=== Tschaikovsky Piano Concerto No. 2 ===
In 1973, Balanchine stripped all allusions to Imperial Russia in the ballet and renamed it Tschaikovsky Piano Concerto No. 2, with the ballet standing only in relation to the music. Balanchine also removed the mime passage in the ballet. In his 1977 book Balanchine's Complete Stories of the Great Ballets, he explained the changes,

I made these changes because the times have changed since the ballet was first done. Our audiences these days don't require elaborate costumes and decoration [sic] in a ballet, and rightly so. We see dancing better than we used to and prefer to see it directly, unencumbered. The music and the dancing themselves are enough here, I hope, to form illusions that scenery and costumes only made specific.

Tschaikovsky Piano Concerto No. 2 was first staged at the New York City Ballet, and was danced before a plain cyclorama. Karinska redesigned the costumes, with the women in mid-calf chiffon dresses rather than tutus. The costumes were redesigned several times throughout the years.

== Choreography ==
Ballet Imperial pays tribute to Petipa, Tchaikovsky and imperial Saint Petersburg, where Balanchine received his ballet training. Tschaikovsky Piano Concerto No. 2, with no allusions to Imperial Russia, is "a work that alludes only to its Romantic, evocative score through powerful kinetic expressiveness," as described in the International Encyclopedia of Dance by Reba Ann Adler.

Balanchine described, "It is a dance ballet and has no story." The choreography features academic steps inspired by Petipa. The ballet is danced by two principal ballerinas, a partner for the first ballerina, two men supporting the second ballerina, two female demi-soloists and a corps de ballet. The first ballerina role, originated by Marie-Jeanne, is considered one of the most difficult roles among Balanchine's works. The role of her partner, however, is more subdued, serving mostly as a supporter for the lead ballerina. In Ballet Imperial, he performs a mime passage. The second ballerina role was created because it would be impossible for one ballerina to dance to all the cadenza. Though corps de ballet in Petipa's days were merely background to the soloists, the corps in Ballet Imperial are active participants that dances challenging choreography like the principal dancers.

== Original cast ==
The dancers who originated the five lead roles in Ballet Imperial are:

- Marie-Jeanne
- Gisella Caccialanza
- William Dollar
- Fred Danieli
- Nicholas Magallanes

== Performances ==
Ballet Imperial had a preview performance on May 29, 1941, at the Little Theater of Hunter College, New York. The ballet then officially premiered on June 25, 1941, at Teatro Municipal, Rio de Janeiro, during the first performance of the tour. American Ballet Caravan performed in nine countries, and the tour ended in October, after which the troupe disbanded.

In 1942, Ballet Imperial was performed at the New Opera, with a cast led by Mary Ellen Moylan, Dollar and Caccialanza. In 1945, Ballet Russe de Monte-Carlo, where Balanchine was a resident choreographer, performed the ballet. The first cast featured Moylan, Maria Tallchief and Nicholas Magallanes. In 1950, the Sadler's Wells Ballet (now the Royal Ballet) debuted the ballet with Margot Fonteyn, Michael Somes and Beryl Grey in the lead roles. La Scala Theatre Ballet first performed the ballet in 1952.

New York City Ballet, founded by Balanchine and Kirstein, first danced Ballet Imperial in 1964, staged by Frederic Franklin, with Suzanne Farrell, Jacques d'Amboise, Patricia Neary, Frank Ohman and Earle Sieveling in the leading roles. The premiere of Tschaikovsky Piano Concerto No. 2 in 1973, also by the New York City Ballet featured a cast led by Patricia McBride, Peter Martins, Colleen Neary, Tracy Bennett and Victor Castelli.

After Balanchine's death in 1983, several ballet companies, including the Royal Ballet, began performing the ballet under the title Ballet Imperial and with the Imperial Russian grandeur again. Some troupes that acquired the ballet after Balanchine's death also opted to dance Ballet Imperial.

Other ballet companies that had danced Ballet Imperial or Tschaikovsky Piano Concerto No. 2 include the Paris Opera Ballet, Mariinsky Ballet, American Ballet Theatre, Australian Ballet, Miami City Ballet, Boston Ballet, Houston Ballet, Pacific Northwest Ballet, Finnish National Ballet, Los Angeles Ballet, and Pittsburgh Ballet Theatre.
