= Concerto Barocco =

Ballet by George Balanchine

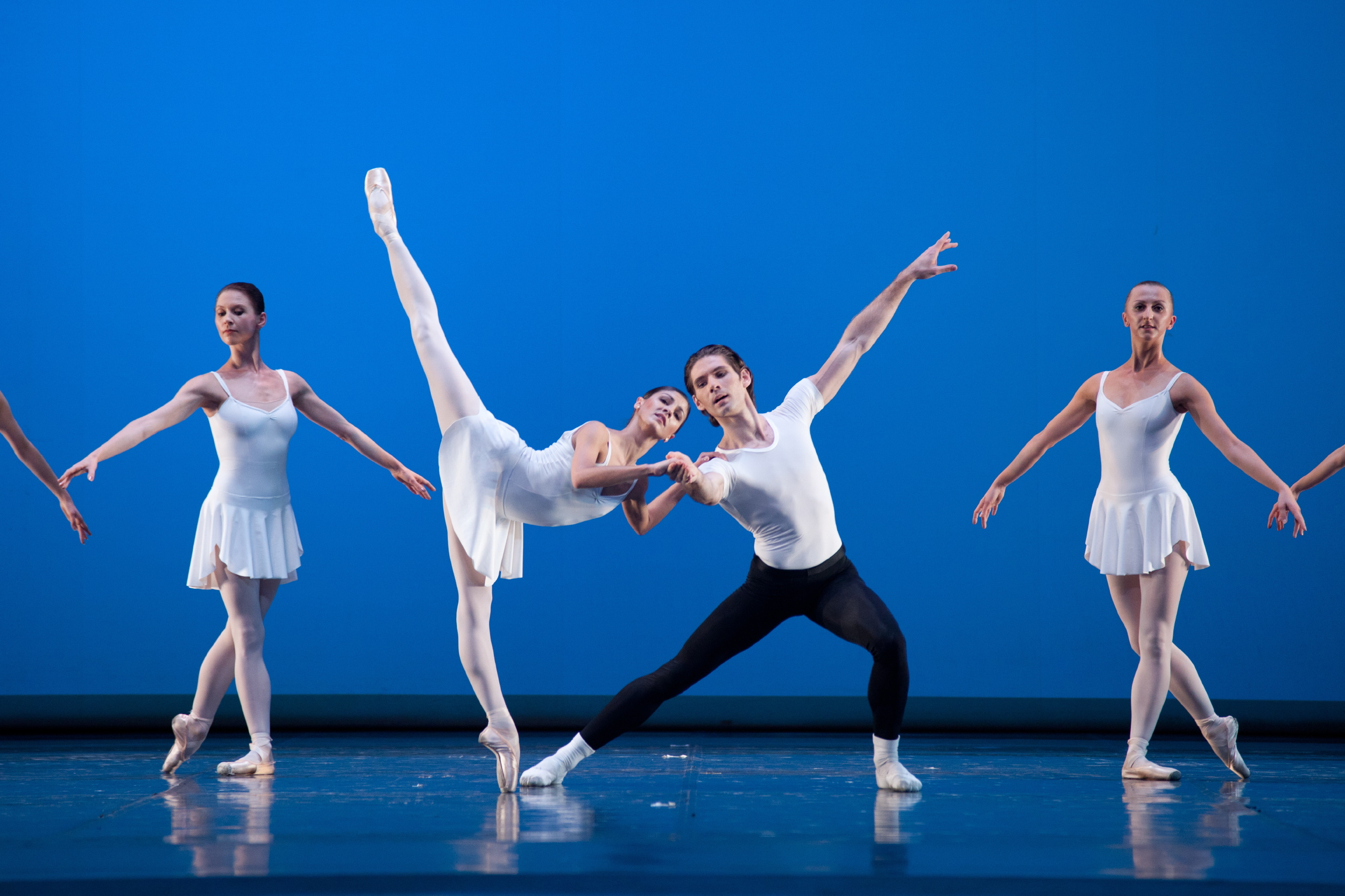
- Polish National Ballet dancers in Concerto Barocco
- Choreographer: George Balanchine
- Music: Johann Sebastian Bach
- Premiere: June 27, 1941; Teatro Municipal
- Original ballet company: American Ballet Caravan
- Design: Eugene Berman
- Created for: Marie-Jeanne; Mary Jane Shea; William Dollar
- Genre: neoclassical ballet

Concerto Barocco is a neoclassical ballet choreographed by George Balanchine to Bach's Concerto for Two Violins. Danced by a cast of eleven, the ballet is completely plotless, and according to Balanchine, "has no "subject matter" beyond the score which it is danced and the particular dancers who execute it". The ballet was made for the American Ballet Caravan's 1941 South American tour, and premiered on June 27, 1941, at Teatro Municipal, Rio de Janeiro. The ballet has entered the repertories of many ballet companies, including Balanchine's New York City Ballet.

== Choreography ==
Concerto Barocco is plotless, and is danced by two principal women, a principal man, and a corps de ballet of eight women. Each of the principal woman dances to one of the violin lines, while the corps dances to the orchestra. The first and third movements featured all ten women, while the second movement is danced by a principal ballerina, the sole man and the corps. One of the principal ballerinas is only absent from the stage in a few instances, while the corps is on stage for the entirety of the ballet.

In his book Balanchine's Complete Stories of the Great Ballets, Balanchine wrote,

The only preparation possible for this ballet is a knowledge of its music, for Concerto Barocco has no "subject matter" beyond the score which it is danced and the particular dancers who execute it. Set to Bach's Concerto in D minor for Two Violins, the ballet tries to interest the audience only by its dancing, its treatment of the ballet, just as Baroque art and architecture interested people not because of their subject but because of the decorative treatment that embellished those subjects.

In the original choreography, Balanchine incorporated elements of jazz dance. Ballet master John Taras described, "Full of odd hips, odd turned-in things... All the dances have syncopation that lies under the Bach score." Suki Schorer, who had danced one of the lead roles, commented,

More difficult in precision in technique is exactitude in timing – the syncopation. [Balanchine] works for hours to get that right. It's as though an ounce makes all the difference. And for all its refinement, he likes it "jazzy". There's one place where the corps almost does the Charleston on pointe. In some of my most brisk and classical movements, he kept saying, "Make it jazzy. Lead with the hip."

Over the years, the choreography was altered, sometimes intentionally by Balanchine and sometimes unintentionally when other dancers took on the roles. For example, a jeté in the second movement was removed due to a dancer's bad knee. The tempo of the ballet was also changed. Parts of the ballet were danced at a slower speed than intended, while others were faster. Marie-Jeanne, the lead ballerina in the original cast, wrote in 1991, "[Balanchine] changed Barocco musically, making it fit the beat. Today's dancers do it slower; they do two beats what we did on one beat. So it's much easier today. It doesn't have the sharpness, and it doesn't have the flow of the adagio." The jazziness in the original choreography was also gone. Taras commented: "Barocco has become rather a tepid, bland classical work now ... And now it's rather romantic, and lyrical. It became diluted."

== Development ==
Balanchine had listened to Bach's Concerto for Two Violins for some years, often a recording by Orchestre symphonique de Paris, conductor Pierre Monteux and violinists Yehudi Menuhin and George Enescu. According to Nathan Milstein, a violinist and friend of Balanchine, the choreographer was interested in Bach for "the mathematical precision of his music and, at the same time, its pure emotional and unfeigned staining for God." In 1936, impresario Lincoln Kirstein urged Balanchine to choreograph a ballet using the concerto for Paul Draper, a tap dancer and son of his friend Muriel Draper. The project did not materialise but gave Balanchine the idea of incorporating American jazz and tap dance techniques and rhythm into the Bach score. Balanchine, who was interested in jazz and African American culture, learned the counting, timing and phrasing techniques in jazz dance through his works with black dancers, including Katherine Dunham, Josephine Baker, Buddy Bradley and the Nicholas Brothers, during the 1930s.

In spring 1941, Balanchine began choreographing Concerto Barocco as an exercise for "stage practice", a course Balanchine taught to advanced students at the School of American Ballet. He choreographed the ballet with the Orchestre symphonique de Paris recording, but was also inspired by a syncopated arrangement of the concerto by jazz pianist Hazel Scott.

Also in 1941, Kirstein was invited by his friend Nelson Rockefeller to organise a dance tour across South America subsidised by the US government. Rockefeller, who was appointed Coordinator of Inter-American Affairs by President Franklin D. Roosevelt, and given a budget to build cultural and financial relations in South America amid World War II. Kirstein said he "was given a check which seemed so large that I was as scared as if I had stolen it." Kirstein and Balanchine then hurriedly formed the American Ballet Caravan, with dancers from their two previous troupes, American Ballet and Ballet Caravan, most of whom had trained at the School of American Ballet under Balanchine. Concerto Barocco was thus set to premiere at the South American tour. Marie-Jeanne, Mary Jane Shea and William Dollar were chosen to dance the three lead roles. Balanchine's then-wife Vera Zorina was set to dance one of the lead roles, but she ultimately did not join the American Ballet Caravan.

The original costumes and sets were designed by Eugene Berman, with a backdrop featuring arches and water and costumes with rubberised fabric, leaves and netting. In the 1945 staging by Ballet Russe de Monte-Carlo, Berman believed the sets were not properly constructed and refused to let the troupe to use his designs. Instead, the dancers were dressed in black practice clothes, an innovative move that would later become a common practice in dance. The 1948 staging at the New York City Ballet featured the Berman designs again. Beginning in 1951, the Berman designs were again dropped from the ballet and replaced by black practice clothes. From 1963 onwards, the women are dressed in white leotards and skirts, and the sole man in a white shirt and black tights. The stripped-down production also features a blue cyclorama.

In his will, Balanchine bequeathed American and media rights to Concerto Barocco to Kirstein. In 1996, Marie-Jeanne took part in a videotaped session in which she coached students of the School of American Ballet to dance Concerto Barocco in its original form. Other participants of the session include former dancer and teacher Suki Schorer, dancer Merrill Ashley, ballet master John Taras and dance historian Nancy Reynolds.

== Performances ==
Concerto Barocco had a preview performance on May 29, 1941, at the Little Theater of Hunter College, New York. The ballet then officially premiered on June 27, 1941, at Teatro Municipal, Rio de Janeiro. American Ballet Caravan performed in nine countries, and the tour ended in October, after which the troupe disbanded.

Concerto Barocco was performed in New York in 1943 by the American Concert Ballet, a short-lived troupe consisted of Balanchine dancers, led by Dollar, Shea and Todd Bolender. In 1945, Ballet Russe de Monte-Carlo, where Balanchine served as resident choreographer, performed the ballet. In 1948, the ballet was performed at the first performance by the New York City Ballet, co-founded by Balanchine and Kirstein, with a cast led by Marie-Jeanne, Ruth Gilbert and Francisco Moncion. It has remained in the company's repertory ever since.

Concerto Barocco is one of Balanchine's most performed works, having entered the repertories of many ballet companies across the US and internationally. By 2020, it was staged nearly 200 times. Other ballet companies that had performed the ballet include San Francisco Ballet, Royal Danish Ballet, National Ballet of Canada, Washington Ballet, Paris Opera Ballet, Boston Ballet, Philadelphia Ballet, Ballet West, Royal Winnipeg Ballet, Dance Theatre of Harlem, Cincinnati Ballet, Los Angeles Ballet, Les Grands Ballets Canadiens, Birmingham Royal Ballet, Pacific Northwest Ballet, Atlanta Ballet, Pittsburgh Ballet Theatre, Les Ballets de Monte-Carlo, Cape Town City Ballet, and New Jersey Ballet.
