= Marie-Jeanne =

American ballet dancer

- Born: Marie-Jeanne Pelus; August 12, 1920; Manhattan, New York, U.S.
- Died: December 28, 2007 (aged 87); Austin, Texas, U.S.
- Other name: Marie-Jeanne Godwin
- Education: School of American Ballet
- Occupation: ballet dancer
- Years active: 1937–1954
- Spouse: Alfonso de Quesada (m. 1942; div. 1947) Dwight S. Godwin (m. 1957; died 1983)
- Children: 3

Marie-Jeanne Godwin (née Pelus, August 12, 1920 – December 28, 2007) was an American ballet dancer. She was one of the first students of George Balanchine's School of American Ballet. Her dance career started at the Ballet Caravan in 1937, followed by stints at Ballet Russe de Monte Carlo, American Ballet Caravan, Ballet International and Ballet Society, before becoming a founding member of the New York City Ballet, where she danced for one season. She then joined Grand Ballet du Marquis de Cuevas, before briefly returning to the New York City Ballet in 1953, and retired in 1954. She was associated with Balanchine throughout her career.

== Early life and training ==
Marie-Jeanne Pelus was born on August 12, 1920, in Manhattan, New York. She was the only child of a French milliner mother and an Italian chef father, both immigrants. She was born on her family's kitchen table because while her father was cooking dinner, her mother went into labor.

She saw her first ballet on New Year's Eve 1933, when her mother "dragged" her to a show danced by Colonel de Basil's Ballet Russe de Monte Carlo, which included George Balanchine's Cotillon and Michel Fokine's Les Sylphides, performed by Alexandra Danilova, Tamara Toumanova, Irina Baronova and Tatiana Riabouchinska. Two days later, she entered School of American Ballet, newly founded by Balanchine. Months later, she danced in the "Preghiera" section of Balanchine's Mozartiana, as well as small roles in Les Songes and Errante. Her teachers included Pierre Vladimiroff, Muriel Stuart, Dorothie Littlefield, Anatole Vilzak, Ludmilla Schollar and Anatole Oboukhoff.

== Career ==
In 1937, 17-year-old Marie-Jeanne joined the Ballet Caravan, a touring company organized by Lincoln Kirstein. She chose to drop her surname, Pelus, as she thought the audience might find it awkward, and people frequently pronounced her surname incorrectly. With the company, Eugene Loring created the double roles of the titular character's mother and dream sweetheart in his Billy the Kid. Loring also chose her to dance as Columbine in Harlequin and South Sea Lady in Yankee Clipper. Lew Christensen created the role of the Rich Girl in Filling Station on her, and cast her as title role in Pocahontas and the Debutante in Charade. Her term with the company ended in 1940. Then, at Balanchine's request, she performed with Ballet Russe de Monte Carlo as a guest dancer, becoming the first American woman to dance with the company, even though she only appeared in two performances of Balanchine's Serenade, which Balanchine reworked to have all the female solos, previously performed by two or three dancers, to be danced by her and included an extra movement.

In 1941, Marie-Jeanne joined the American Ballet Caravan, merged from Ballet Caravan and American Ballet, and Balanchine's first U.S. company. During the company's tour in Latin America the same year, she originated lead roles in two ballets choreographed by Balanchine, Concerto Barocco and Ballet Imperial, and also danced as Terpsichore in Apollo. Her first novel, Yankee Ballerina, was published the same year. Marie-Jeanne got married in 1942, and the news infuriated Balanchine. She moved to Buenos Aires with her husband, and stopped dancing while she was trying to get pregnant. During this period, Balanchine was in Argentina staging Mozart Violin Concerto for Teatro Colón, and wanted her to dance it, as well as the revivals of Apollo and Concietro, but she turned down the offer. After her first child was born in 1943, she started dancing again and continued her collaborations with Balanchine.

In 1944, Marie-Jeanne danced with Marquis de Cuevas's Ballet International, where she created a role in André Eglevsky's Colloque Sentimental. The following year, she was one of a small group of dancers that took part in Balanchine's tour to Mexico. Between 1945 and 1947, she returned to Ballet Russe de Monte Carlo, when Balanchine was attached to the company. With the company, she reprised her roles in Concerto Baracco and Ballet Imperial, and originated the role of Harlequin in Night Shadow, a role that had since been performed by men. Balanchine did not invite her to join the Ballet Society when he formed the company.

In 1948, Marie-Jeanne joined Ballet Society, where Balanchine cast her as the First Symph in Bacchus and Ariadne. Ballet Society became the New York City Ballet later that year. At New York City Ballet's inaugural performance, she danced Concerto Baracco. Her second book, Opera Ballerina, was published the same year. She left the New York City Ballet in 1949, when she married her second husband. She then joined Grand Ballet du Marquis de Cuevas in Europe. In 1953, she briefly returned to the New York City Ballet at Kirstein's invitation, but after two injuries, Balanchine told her, "You'd better go home. You're like Joe Louis, you can't make a comeback." After speaking to Kirstein, she decided to retire in 1954.

Marie-Jeanne, who was associated with Balanchine throughout her career, occasionally coached other dancers her Balanchine roles, including a 1996 rehearsal for Concerto Barocco that was filmed for the Balanchine Foundation archive. In 1967, she began teaching at the Florida-based Joni Messler Studio of Dance and Gainesville Ballet Theatre. With the latter, she contributed on a solo in The Little Match Girl, based on a solo Balanchine taught her. In 1995, she helped the Dance Alive National Ballet acquire the rights to Apollo. She had also taught at University of Florida.

== Personal life ==
Marie-Jeanne and Balanchine lived together in 1940, but the relationship ended as she wanted children but he did not.

In 1942, she married Argentine impresario Alfonso de Quesada. They had a daughter before divorcing in 1947. She married again in 1949, though the marriage also ended. In 1957, she married photographer and filmmaker Dwight S. Godwin, with whom she had two sons. She moved to Gainesville, Florida, in the 1960s, after Godwin accepted a teaching position at the University of Florida. After her husband's death in 1983, she split her time between Gainesville and Spain, before relocating to Texas in the 1990s to live with one of her sons.

In her later life, she had Parkinson's disease, and lived in a retirement home in Austin, Texas. On December 28, 2007, Marie-Jeanne died from congestive heart failure, aged 87.
