= Joseph Duell =

American dancer and choreographer for the New York City Ballet

- Born: April 30, 1956; Dayton, Ohio, US
- Died: February 16, 1986 (aged 29); New York City, US
- Occupations: Dancer, choreographer
- Known for: Classical ballet dancing

Joseph Duell (April 30, 1956 – February 16, 1986) was an American dancer and choreographer for the New York City Ballet. The day after his performance in George Balanchine's Symphony in C, for which he was praised for the elegance of his classical style, Duell jumped from the window of his apartment building on West 77th Street and died in an apparent suicide.

== Early life ==
Joseph Duell was born in Dayton, Ohio, the son of a Baptist minister. His upbringing was described as strict, but he and his older brother Daniel were encouraged to follow artistic and expressive pursuits. He learned to play drums and piano while Daniel played flute. Both brothers began taking ballet classes (Joseph at age 7), studying under two well-known teachers in Dayton: Hermine and Josephine Schwarz. Joseph and Daniel were both considered to be very promising, and at age 10, Joseph received a Ford Foundation scholarship to continue his training. At age 15, he was recruited by the School of American Ballet and traveled to New York for their summer session. He stayed as a full-time scholarship student.

== Career ==
In 1975, Duell followed his brother Daniel in joining the New York City Ballet corps. It was around this time that he began to harbor a "secret competitive feeling" with Daniel, he would confess years later. The intensity of these competitive thoughts and feelings of inadequacy led him to a deep depression, and after a year and a half he dropped out of the company. He later recounted in a New York Times interview, "I couldn't avoid the comparison with Dan and other boys who were physically much more knit ... I hadn't yet worked out who I was and why I was dancing."

However, four months after he dropped out, Duell returned to the company more driven than ever. Apparently having moved past his internal crisis, he and his brother became very close again, and he worked hard to perfect his art. Suki Schorer, a former teacher at the School of American Ballet who worked with him during this period, said of him, "What God gave him to dance with wasn't terrific, but he took it and became a beautiful dancer, performing with a great musical sense."

In 1980, Duell was promoted to soloist, and in 1982 as a choreographer he made his debut with the company, La Creation Du Monde, which was well received by the critics. His dancing career flourished, and in 1984 he was promoted to principal.

== Personal life ==
According to his close friends and colleagues, Duell was a man of deep thought who approached his art with an obsessive, mechanical, and often frustrated passion. A New York Times interview with his mentor, George Balanchine, described him: "Unlike many young dancers, he was not satisfied to convey beauty and grace; he wanted to pick apart and understand these gauzy concepts. Mr. Duell did not merely want to perform the fifth position in ballet; he wanted to know why the fifth position was central to classical technique."

His friend and fellow dancer, Toni Bentley, said of Joseph, "He was extremely intense and very introverted sometimes - you'd see him thinking, and he wouldn't even see you."

Despite these internal conflicts, he maintained an outward demeanor of a charming, affable and giving young man. Only later would he confess in an interview that he was battling depression and personal demons of high creative standards and long-ago sibling rivalry. It was also later revealed that Duell had been under the care of both a psychologist and a psychiatrist for several years and had been taking an antidepressant medication.

Some friends said they noticed that he seemed more depressed in his last days. An official of the ballet company said, "Everyone was worried about him in the last two weeks. He was terribly overstrung in the last couple of weeks, and he began to talk about being depressed, but he wasn't the type to burden people with his problems."

== Death ==
The day before his death, Saturday, February 15, Duell made his final performance in George Balanchine's Symphony in C. That evening he was seen by his brother Daniel, who would later tell the police that he had been feeling dejected, but Daniel "didn't think anything was really wrong," according to Martin Duffy, the investigating detective in the 20th Precinct.

That night, according to fellow dancer Toni Bentley, Duell immersed himself in work. He went to rehearsal and "worked like crazy on 'Who Cares?' the Gershwin ballet." She added, "He hadn't gone and holed himself up. He had many chances to reach out."

The following morning, Sunday, February 16 at around 10 A.M. according to police, Joseph Duell jumped from the fifth-story window of his West 77th Street apartment in Manhattan and died at the scene. No note or explanation was found.

Jerome Robbins dedicated his ballet Quiet City, music by Aaron Copland, to Duell's memory.
