= Serenade (ballet) =

Ballet by George Balanchine to Tchaikovsky's 1880 Serenade for Strings in C, Op. 48

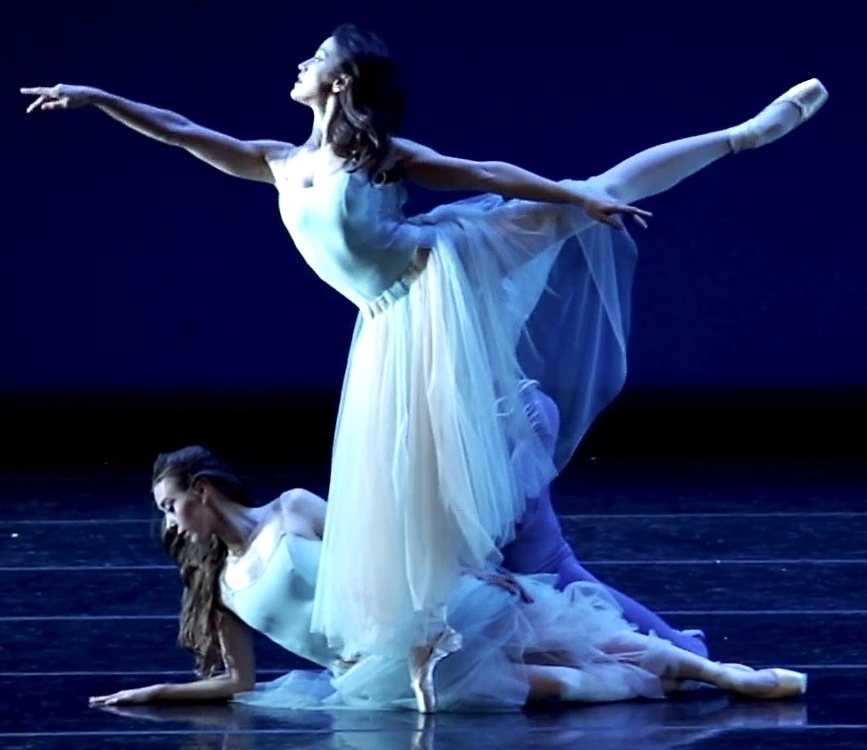
- Kansas City Ballet's Kaleena Burks and Kelsey Hellebuyck in Serenade
- Choreographer: George Balanchine
- Music: Pyotr Ilyich Tchaikovsky
- Premiere: March 1, 1935; Adelphi Theatre; New York City, United States
- Original ballet company: American Ballet

Serenade is a ballet by George Balanchine to Tchaikovsky's 1880 Serenade for Strings in C, Op. 48. Serenade is credited as being George Balanchine's first full-length ballet in America. Using the students of his newly formed School of American Ballet, Balanchine choreographed this ballet for an American audience that had not been widely exposed to ballet before. Students of the School of American Ballet gave the first performance on Sunday, 10 June 1934 on the Felix M. Warburg estate in White Plains, N.Y., where Mozartiana had been danced the previous day. It was then presented by the Producing Company of the School of American Ballet on 6 December at the Avery Memorial Theatre of the Wadsworth Atheneum with sets by the painter William Littlefield. Balanchine presented the ballet as his response to the generous sponsorships he received during his immigration to America. The official premiere took place on 1 March 1935 with the American Ballet at the Adelphi Theatre, New York, conducted by Sandor Harmati.

NYCB principal dancer Philip Neal chose to include Serenade in his farewell performance on Sunday, 13 June 2010.

The blue tutus used in Serenade inspired the naming of the Balanchine crater on the planet Mercury.

== Analysis ==
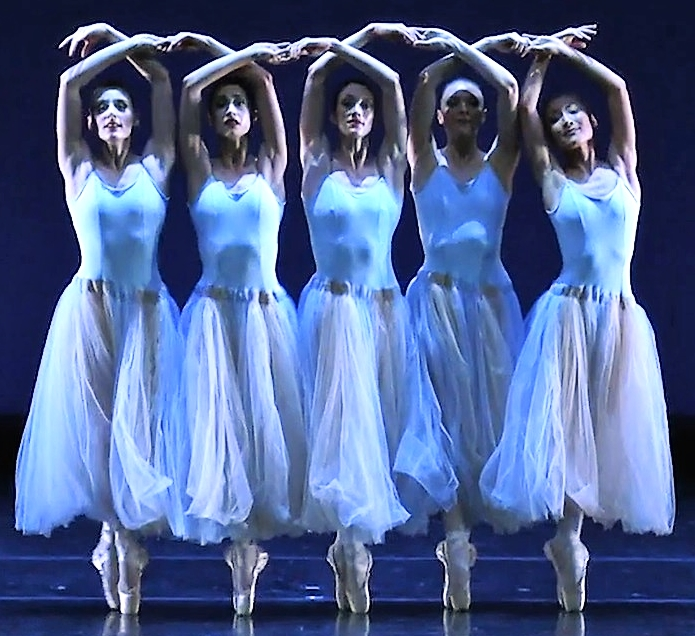
Kansas City Ballet dancers in Serenade

The work can be considered a bridge between his two early works for Sergei Diaghilev and his later, less episodic American works. The dance is characterized by two falls, a choreographic allusion to Giselle, but also an element in the Khorumi, a Georgian folk dance which influenced Balanchine. While Serenade is one of Balanchine's infamous plotless ballets, many elements of the dance seem to point towards a loose form of a story. As dancers came and went during the rehearsal process, Balanchine choreographed their entrances and exits into the piece. At the beginning of rehearsals, Balanchine started with seventeen young women, reflected in the opening scene of the ballet. The next rehearsal there were only nine women present and then six, so he choreographed the following scenes with those numbers of dancers. Male students began to attend the rehearsals and so they were choreographed in, and the late arrival of one woman was also included. While plotless, Serenade reflected the ups and downs of choreographing a ballet, and made the humanity of the dancers clear when he choreographed their real-life mistakes into the finished product.

By achieving this, Balanchine made the ballet very student-friendly: according to City Ballet's Robert Gottlieb, the ballet was formed in such a way “in order to have something to teach the students with—something they could handle yet would stretch their abilities,”. The rehearsal process was extensive - according to some sources the students underwent as long as six months of rehearsal before their first performance in 1934 - and included levels of increasingly difficult technique as the ballet went on. Starting with a simple gesture phrase, the ballet then explores everything from complex formations to technical elements of partnering in the “Waltzing Girl”, for example. Thus, the ballet acted as an important teaching tool that students of all advanced levels could potentially participate in and work up to as a graduation exercise.

Choreographed to a Tchaikovsky score and with references to traditional ballets such as Giselle and Swan Lake, Balanchine created an atmosphere using blue tutus for the women and dimmed lighting.

While the piece was first choreographed with students in mind, the American Ballet is the first ballet company credited with performing it. Starting in 1935 the company performed Serenade, first for two weeks in New York City and then moving on with a fourteen-week tour of the United States. While their early performances were not highly successful, many interpreted this “lack of enthusiasm as an indication of the company’s immaturity,” and ballet's general premature introduction to the United States.

== Original cast ==
- Leda Anchutina
- Holly Howard
- Elise Reiman
- Elena de Rivas
- Sylvia Giselle (Gisella Caccialanza)
- Helen Leitch
- Annabelle Lyon
- Kathryn Mullowny
- Heidi Vosseler
- Ruthanna Boris
- Charles Laskey

== General references ==
- Playbill, NYCB, Friday, February 22, 2008
- Repertory Week, NYCB, Winter season, 2008 repertory, week 7

== Articles ==
- Sunday NY Times, June 10, 1934
- NY Times, June 11, 1934
- NY Times, February 10, 1936
- Sunday NY Times by John Martin, July 27, 1941
- NY Times by John Martin, June 24, 1942
- Sunday NY Times by Anna Kisselgoff, September 25, 1983
- Hershenson, Roberta (April 11, 2004). "Balanchine Created Here". The New York Times.

=== Obituaries ===
- NY Times of Marie-Jeanne by Jack Anderson, January 3, 2008

== Reviews ==
- NY Times by John Martin, October 18, 1940
- NY Times by John Martin, December 21, 1956
- NY Times by John Martin, August 29, 1959
- Ballet Magazine, by Eric Taub, February–March 2004
- NY Times by Jennifer Dunning, February 18, 2008
