= Barbara Karinska =

Ukrainian-American costumier (1886–1983)

- Варвара Каринська
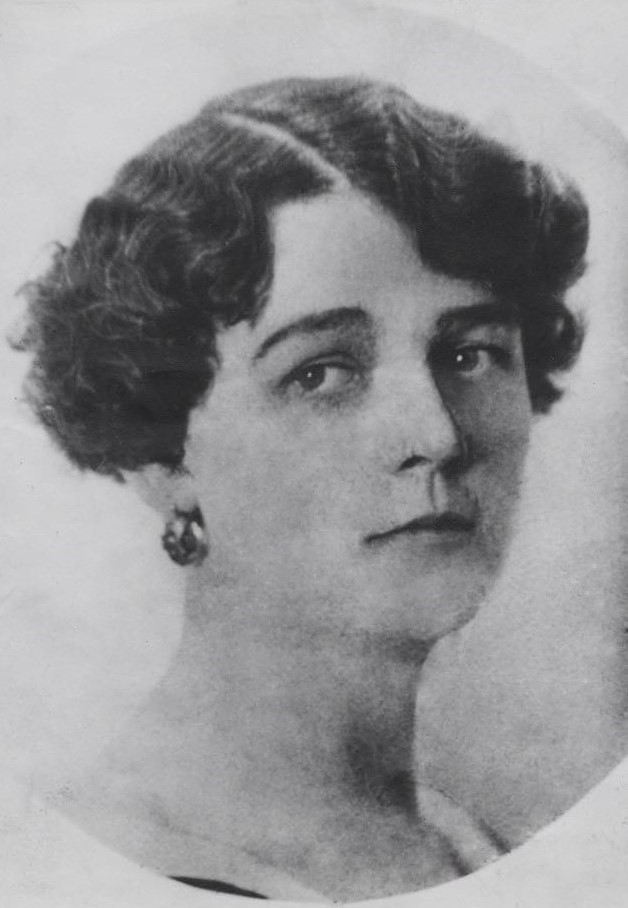
- Born: October 3, 1886; Kharkiv, Russian Empire
- Died: October 18, 1983 (aged 97)
- Other name: Karinska
- Occupation: costumier
- Employer(s): Ballet Russe de Monte Carlo, New York City Ballet, Broadway and Hollywood film industry
- Known for: designing the 'powder puff' tutu
- Awards: Oscar 1948 for color costume design for 'Joan of Arc', Capezio Dance Award 1962, Oscar nominee 1952 for 'Hans Christian Andersen'

Varvara Jmoudsky, better known as Barbara Karinska or simply Karinska (October 3, 1886 – October 18, 1983), was a Ukrainian-American costumier of cinema, ballet, musical and dramatic theatre, lyric opera and ice spectacles. Over her 50-year career, that began at age 41, Karinska earned legendary status time and again through her continuing collaborations with stage designers including Christian Bérard, André Derain, Irene Sharaff, Raoul Pêne du Bois and Cecil Beaton; performer-producers Louis Jouvet and Sonja Henie; ballet producers René Blum, Colonel de Basil and Serge Denham. Her longest and most renown collaboration was with choreographer George Balanchine for more than seventy ballets — the first known to be “The Celebrated Popoff Porcelain,” a one act ballet for Nikita Balieff's 1929 La Chauve-Souris with music by Pyotr Ilyich Tchaikovsky for which Karinska executed the costumes design by Sergey Tchekhonin. She began to design costumes for Balanchine ballets in 1949 with Emmanuel Chabrier's “Bourrèe Fantasque,” for the newly founded New York City Ballet. Their final collaboration was the 1977 "Vienna Waltzes.” Balanchine and Karinska together developed the American (or powder puff) tutu ballet costume which became an international costume standard.

With Dorothy Jeakins, she won the 1948 Oscar for color costume design (the first year costume design was divided into color and black & white categories) for Joan of Arc, and was nominated in 1952 for the Samuel Goldwyn musical Hans Christian Andersen, starring Danny Kaye. She was the first costume designer to win the Capezio Dance Award, in 1962, for costumes "of visual beauty for the spectator and complete delight for the dancer".

Karinska divided her time between homes in Manhattan, Sandisfield, Massachusetts, and Domrémy-la-Pucelle, France, the birthplace of Joan of Arc.

== Early life (From the memoirs of Lawrence Vlady) ==
Barbara Karinska was born Varvara Andriivna Jmudska (Ukrainian: Варвара Андріївна Жмудськa) in 1886, in the city of Kharkiv, Russian Empire (now in Ukraine). She was baptized in the Orthodox Church. Her father was a wealthy wholesaler of cotton goods, philanthropist and city father. She was the third and eldest female of the ten Jmoudsky siblings. Karinska learned Victorian embroidery as a child from her German and Swiss governesses. She studied law at Kharkiv Imperial University. In 1907, she married Alexander Moiseenko, the son of another wealthy Kharkiv merchant. Moiseenko died in 1909 several months before the birth of their daughter Irina. In 1910, Varvara's older brother Anatoly, owner of the moderately Socialist Kharkiv newspaper Utro (Morning), went through divorce proceedings that resulted in Varvara winning custody of his two-year-old son, her nephew, Vladimir Anatolevich Jmoudsky. Vladimir and Irina were raised as brother and sister.

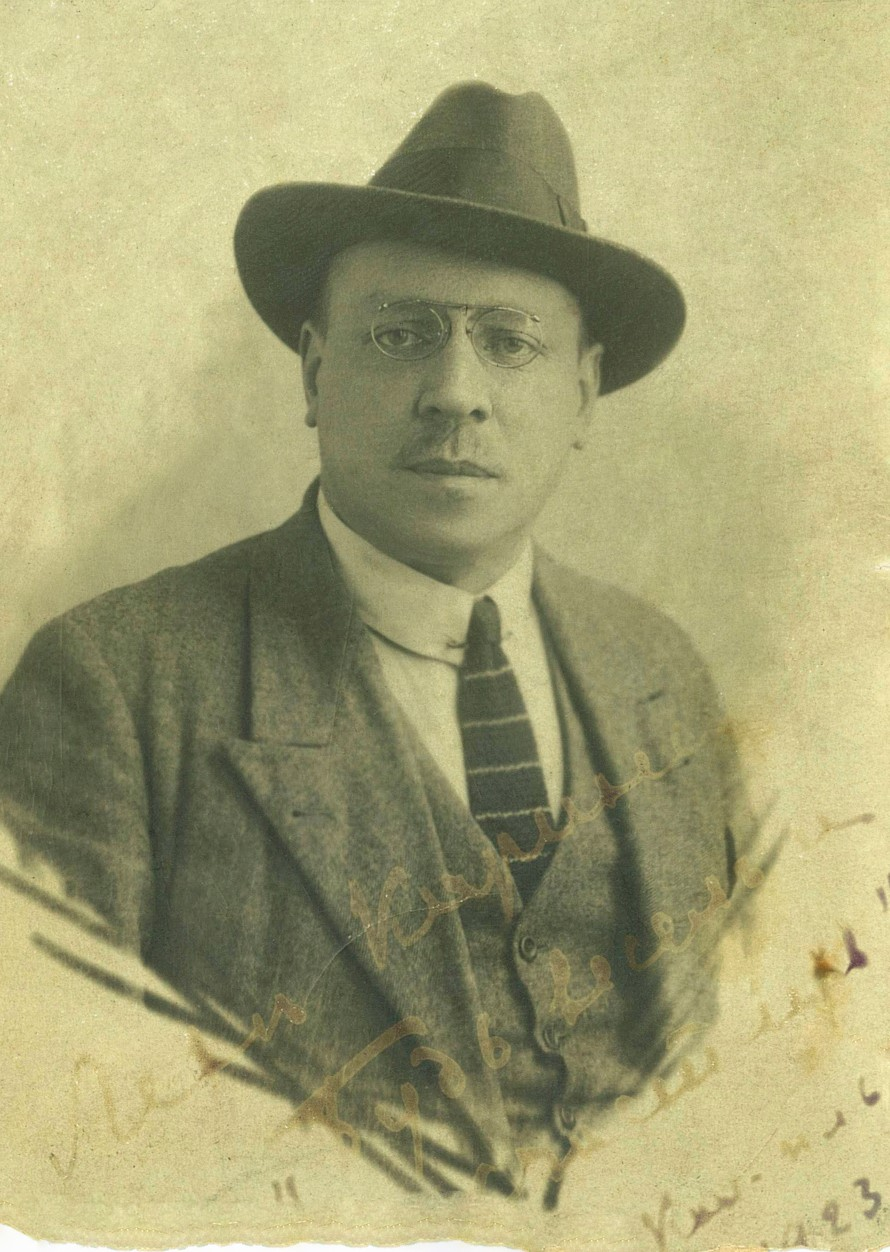
Nikolai Karinsky in 1923

Varvara remarried a prominent lawyer, Nikolai Sergeevich Karinsky (N.S. Karinsky, 1873–1948), from Moscow, who was residing in Kharkiv. With his law practice burgeoning, the Karinsky family of four moved to Moscow in 1916, to a spacious apartment that Varvara had purchased. Karinsky continued to practice criminal and political law and gained fame and prestige throughout the Russian Empire. Varvara, meanwhile, became totally engrossed in the arts and hosted her famous salon every night after the theater or ballet. She developed her own form of painting applying pieces of colored silk gauze to photographs and drawings. Her first subjects were ballet scenes. After much tearing apart and redoing, she exhibited about 12 of her works in a prominent Moscow gallery and was quite successful both financially and critically.

Czar Nicholas II abdicated in March 1917. In May, 1917, under the Provisional Government, Nikolai Karinsky was appointed Prosecutor of the St. Petersburg Court of Justice. He and Varvara resided in the capital several months, leaving the children in the care of their governess in Moscow.

Following the Bolshevik Revolution of October 1917, Varvara, Irina and Vladimir spent the years of the Civil War moving between Kharkiv and Crimea. Karinsky who held posts off and on as prosecutor under the White government of the South joined them sporadically.

As 1920 began, Varvara and the children were living in Yalta. In February Karinsky was appointed Deputy Minister of the Interior of the South Russian Government with headquarters in Novorossiysk. With the fall of Crimea to the Red forces in October of that year, Karinsky was a marked man. Unable to find his family, several of Varvara's sisters and brothers forced him to leave Crimea with them by ship, assuring him that Varvara would soon follow. But Varvara had decided to remain in Crimea.

Even as Karinsky made his way from Constantinople to New York, Varvara made her way back to Moscow leaving the children in Yalta for close to a year under the care of the faithful governess. In 1921, Varvara met and married Vladimir Mamontov, son of one of Moscow's wealthiest pre-revolutionary industrialists. Having lost everything, Mamontov remained with nothing except his charm, beautiful piano playing and the delusion that someday his late father's fortune would be returned to him.

Lenin's New Economic Policy (1921–1928) provided for limited capitalism to help finance his new regime exhausted and debilitated by three years of civil war. Karinska opened a Tea Salon that became the meeting place of Moscow artists, intellectuals and government officials every afternoon at five o’clock. In the same complex she founded an haute-couture and a millinery atelier to dress the wives of the Soviet elite. She opened an antique store and an embroidery school where she taught the needle arts to the proletariat.

Karinska's reasons for leaving RSFSR are multiple: (1) the death of Lenin in 1924 and the uncertainty of what was to come; (2) within weeks after Lenin's death the new regime nationalized her embroidery school and turned it into a factory to manufacture Soviet flags (in exchange, she was awarded the title of “Inspector of Fine Arts”); (3), importantly Mamontov, a chronic alcoholic was incapable of performing any kind of work and thus seen as a symbol of bourgeois decadence; his arrest was imminent.

Karinska devised a plan to save Mamontov. Supported by Anatoly Lunacharsky, Minister of Education and long time friend of her father, she proposed to take a large number of embroideries made by her students to exhibit in Western European cities as a “good will” gesture to demonstrate the great cultural advances that the young Soviet regime was making. The proposition was enthusiastically accepted across the high ranks, although Lunacharsky and others knew quite well what she was up to.

With corruption widely practiced throughout the Soviet government, an exit visa was obtained for Mamontov who left immediately for Germany where he had cousins in exile. A few weeks later Karinska, Irina and Vladimir left together from Moscow station on a Berlin-bound train. Irina boarded the train whimpering under the weight of a huge chapeau. “Stop whining!” her mother would scold. Later the girl of 14 learned that the hat was filled with diamonds. Vladimir boarded the train with a suitcase filled with his Soviet school books, American hundred dollar bills, bought on the black market, hidden between the pages. Karinska boarded the train waving and blowing kisses to the crowd that came to bid her bon voyage. But the crates with her student's embroideries framed under glass had, hidden underneath each, antique embroideries sewn by the ladies-in-waiting to the Russian Empresses of the past centuries. Reuniting with Vladimir Mamontov in Berlin, the family of four headed for Brussels where Karinska's father and several brothers and sisters were living. But Brussels was too quiet for Karinska and after a few months they moved to Paris.

== Life in Paris ==
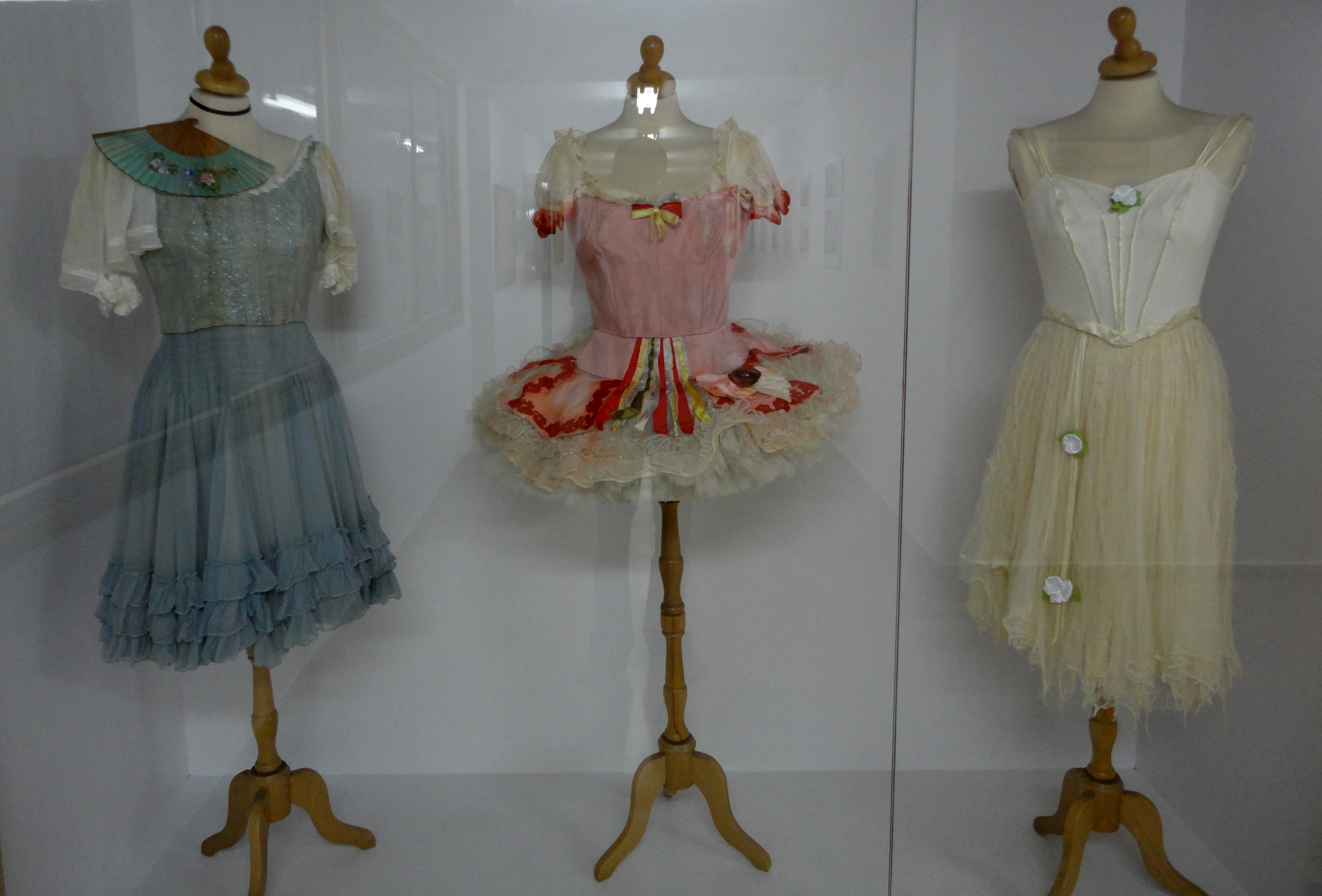
Costumes by Barbara Karinska for the Ballet Russe de Monte Carlo: from left – Coppelia (act 2), Coppelia (act 1), and Giselle (act 2). Displayed at Beit Ariela, Tel Aviv-Yafo.

After two years of luxurious living in Paris, all the treasures brought from home were gone. The family was forced to move to a popular quarter of the city of lights and Karinska looked desperately for any and every kind of work using her skills of sewing and embroidery. With her beauty and aplomb she had no difficulty meeting whoever she wanted to meet. It wasn't long before she made her first costume; an elaborately embroidered robe designed by Boris Bilinsky for the 1927 motion picture The Loves of Casanova. More single orders followed and then larger and larger ones. All the time Irina and Vladimir worked with her. A newly formed ballet company, the Ballet Russe de Monte Carlo, directed by Colonel de Basil and René Blum requested she make costumes for their first season. The costumes were designed by Christian Bérard, André Derain, and Joan Miró, and the choreography was by George Balanchine and Leonide Massine, both choreographers with whom she had worked previously. Bérard, Derain, and Miró would provide a general sketch, an idea, but it would be Karinska who expounded upon the concept, modified it, chose the fabric, quality and quantity, and decided how the concept would be implemented. During Karinska's brief career in Paris she also collaborated with Balthus, Cassandre, Soudeikine, and Vertès, and other painters and designers. She costumed the plays of Jean Cocteau and Louis Jouvet. In 1933, Karinska costumed Les Ballets 1933 (designed by Bèrard, Derain, and Tchelitchev amongst others), Balanchine's six ballets in Paris before he left for New York.

== Life in London ==
In 1936, and free of Mamontov for several years, a series of circumstances led Karinska to make the decision to leave Paris. Her daughter remained and the business was reopened under the name “Irène Karinska”. Barbara Karinska and Vladimir, sponsored by Mme. Hayward Court Dressmaker, settled in London. The partnership was short lived and, after a second short-lived partnership with another prestigious London dress firm, Karinska and Vladimir rented the Sir Joshua Reynolds House where they each took an upper floor for their respective flats while the spacious lower floors housed the costume making facilities.

The London years were far more prosperous than Paris. They costumed ballet, musical revue, Shakespeare, and cinema while still attending to Louis Jouvet back in Paris. Together with Bérard, Karinska and Vladimir experimented very successfully with new materials never before used in theater. Here Karinska began her long collaborative relationship with Cecil Beaton.

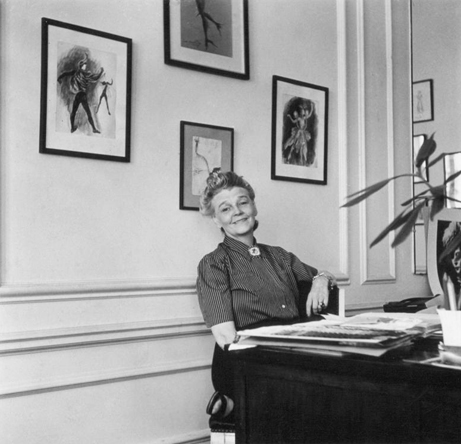
Barbara Karinska in her London Studio, 1939

But war was in the making and early in 1939, Karinska abandoned her London empire, on short notice, and moved permanently to the United States, leaving her nephew to close the business with honor; evacuate Reynolds's House and liquidate his aunt's accumulation of costume sketches and antiques. Irène came to London immediately to sign all release documents in her mother's place.

Karinska appeared in New York early in 1939 of her own volition and quickly resumed work that began in London with the New York manifestation of the Ballets Russes de Monte Carlo directed by Serge Denham who helped her to immigrate and provided working space where she launched her American career with BRMC's “Ghost Town,” with costumes designed by Raoul Pêne de Bois and Salvador Dalí's “Venusberg” from “Tannheuser” — both presented in New York in the fall of 1939.

England and France declared war on Germany in September 1939, and Vladimir, feeling greater allegiance to France than to England, returned to Paris and enlisted in the French army. Wounded, captured and escaping from a German POW camp in August 1940, made his way to the South of France where he received the Croix de Guerre for Bravery. Karinska's sister, Angelina, was living near the military base where Vladimir was billeted. She had just received Karinska's address in New York from Irène in Paris and put aunt and nephew in touch.

== United States ==
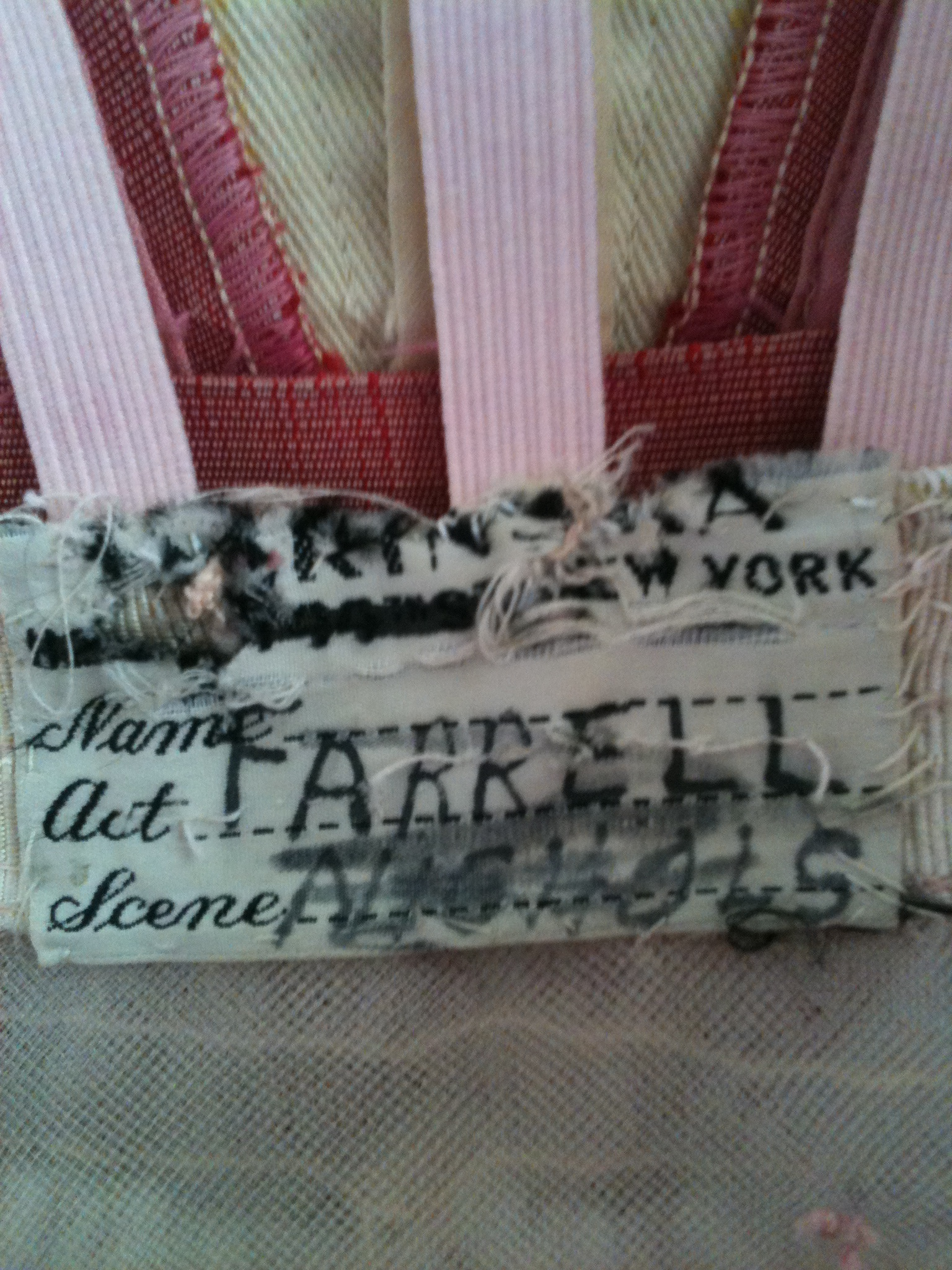
Original Karinska label in a costume for the New York City Ballet's production of Scotch Symphony. Worn by dancers Suzanne Farrell and Kyra Nichols. From the Barbara Karinska Collection at Ailina Dance Archives.

=== Nephew Vlady's and daughter Irène's involvement ===
Through a Spanish dancer, Karinska made friends with the Spanish Consul and confided to him her nephew's case. Vladimir received instructions to make his way to the Spanish border where he would be provided safe transit to a ship leaving Lisbon for New York, via Havana. Emaciated and sickly, he arrived to New York in January 1941 where he was smothered by his aunts hugs and kisses. His new apartment awaited him at the mansion that Karinska was renting on E. 56th Street.

Karinska at that time was ridding herself of her partners, “The Princess and the Baron”, from a fly by night venture in haute-couture. She kept the mansion; the name Karinska Inc. and the parquet floor that the Baron had had brought to New York from a family castle in France.

Shortly after Vlady's arrival they began executing the designs of Karinska's arch rival Irene Sharaff for Gypsy Rose Lee. Miss Lee believed that Karinska understood the impact of her performance and enhanced her ability to deliver her unique style of burlesque to the audience. Vladimir hit it off well with Sharaff and made it possible for the two rivals to work together.

But rivalry soon ensued between Vladimir and Kermit Love who designed Agnes de Mille's Rodeo for the Ballet Russe de Monte Carlo. Vladimir and Love were both makers of masks and hard costumes. But the rivalry was short lived as Vladimir was drafted into the United States Army.

Since the German occupation of Paris, Karinska had lost contact with her daughter, Irène, who was living in Sarthe at the family residence of her husband, Xavier François. It was Vladimir the soldier who found Irène days before the liberation of Paris and from his nearby barracks wrote to Karinska special delivery informing her that she was a grandmother twice over. Vladimir entered the American Army in 1943 as Private Vladimir Jmoudsky and returned to civilian life in 1945 as Lieutenant Lawrence Vlady.

Back to work with Karinska, Vlady brought to the costumer something she had never known: American military order, discipline and administration. The 56th Street mansion was soon abandoned; Karinska Inc. was liquidated and the Karinska-Vlady enterprise, KARINSKA Stage and Art Inc., made its debut in a rather unsightly loft on W. 44th Street where Karinska's costumes, always delivered at the last moment, could be walked over to the theaters if needs be. The affordable rent of the dusty atelier permitted Karinska to purchase a townhouse on E. 63rd St. (where the Baron's parquet floor was installed); a house in Joan of Arc's home town, Domrémy-la-Pucelle, in the Lorraine region of Eastern France, and a George Washington period house that she named "Saint Joan Hill" in Sandisfield, Massachusetts.

During the war years, while Karinska took extensive leaves to supervise costume production for motion pictures in Hollywood, she would rent her 56th St. mansion and her staff to ballet and theater companies, ventures that always ended in misunderstandings. With Vlady permanently settled in New York, he would run the business while Karinska worked in Hollywood. Under this arrangement she won her Oscar for Joan of Arc and her Oscar nomination for Hans Christian Andersen. These were the “Golden Years”. The label “KARINSKA Stage and Art Inc.” was sewn into costumes for ice shows, musicals, legitimate theater, motion pictures, lyric opera and the most important for the 'Lady from Kharkov' – Ballet.

At the end of the German occupation of Paris, Irène Karinska reopened her costume atelier and worked successfully until retirement in the 1970s. Due to the fact that Irène's work was often credited as "Costumes par Karinska", researchers have credited much of her work to her mother. Costume design of the 1953 French film adaptation of La Dame aux Camélias was credited to Barbara Karinska when, in fact, the costumes were designed by Rosine Delamere and executed by Irène Karinska. Costumes designed by Raoul Dufy, Georges Braque, Leonor Fini, and Yves St Laurent (for Roland Petit) are the work of Irène Karinska. Costumes for the 1958 Oscar-winning musical Gigi, designed by Cecil Beaton were executed by Irène Karinska.

The last costumes executed by Stage & Art Inc. were for Franco Zeffirelli's production of Verdi's Falstaff, that debuted March 6, 1964— one of the last productions at the Old Metropolitan Opera House. Karinska had signed a contract with the Ford Foundation to operate the New York City Ballet's new costume shop. In April 1964 Karinska sold Stage and Art's physical plant to Vlady for one US Dollar. Half the staff chose to stay with Vlady in his new business Lawrence Vlady, Inc. and half went with Karinska to her new atelier first located at 10 W. 57th St. Vlady continued their commitment to the Metropolitan Opera executing a share of the 1964 Lucia di Lammermoor by Donizetti designed by Atilio Colonello. Next came two back short-lived period costume musicals designed by Motley—Ben Franklin in Paris 1964, and Baker Street 1965. He then executed all the masks and armor for Balanchine's 1965 Don Quixote. His career looked promising, however, advanced Macular Degeneration rendered him unable to read costume sketches and he retired following his share of costumes for the Met's 1966 Cleopatra by Samuel Barber and Franco Zeffirelli.

=== New York City Ballet ===
In 1964 Karinska was invited by Balanchine to join the New York City Ballet at the New York State Theater at Lincoln Center, newly injected with generous grants from the Ford Foundation. This period that lasted thirteen years produced a long list of ballet productions in different musical genres, including some abstract designs —such as “Jewels” 1967— is often praised by critics as Karinska's greatest and condemned by others for “garish” colors. For a full list of Balanchine-Karinska collaborations see: The George Balanchine Foundation Online Catalog.

Both aging during the 1970s Balanchine and Karinska returned to a fantasy ballet they had begun in the early 1950s —"Birds of America," based on the drawings of John J. Audubon. Elaborate beyond possibility, "Birds of America" was never meant to be materialized; it was a means to keep their attention on life and beauty. Balanchine would spend long sojourns at Karinska's Berkshire home. Karinska would make endless sketches by pasting pieces of fine fabric onto pencil-drawn figures on heavy watercolor paper. They would walk in the woods daily and Balanchine would choreograph by imitating the dances of different birds. (Eyewitnesses remarked on the immense effort and skills required to make the complex costumes with the 'extra bounce', in the 1970s, for example resulting in the Cincinnati Ballet gaining knowledge of her 'secret' methods.)[21]

In 1983, Balanchine died in April and Karinska died on 18 October; two weeks after her 97th birthday, but six years after a debilitating stroke left her unable to speak or move.

== The "powder puff" tutu ==
With a large assembly of dancers on stage – as was often preferred by Balanchine—the traditional "pancake" tutu with its stiff wired layer would bob and dip when the dancers' skirts brushed up against one another and this bobbing and dipping would reverberate long after the steps were complete.

Karinska solved this problem by devising the "powder puff" tutu, with a shorter skirt made of six or seven layers of gathered net, each layer a half inch longer than the preceding layer. The layers were tacked together for a fluffier, looser appearance than the stiff "pancake" tutu. Because the shorter layers are self-supporting, no wire hoop is needed in the "powder puff" tutu, or the Balanchine-Karinska or American tutu. This tutu design has become standard in ballet companies all over the world since it first appeared in 1950, in the ballet Symphony in C. She also cut the bodice material in a way that was more comfortable for the dancer.

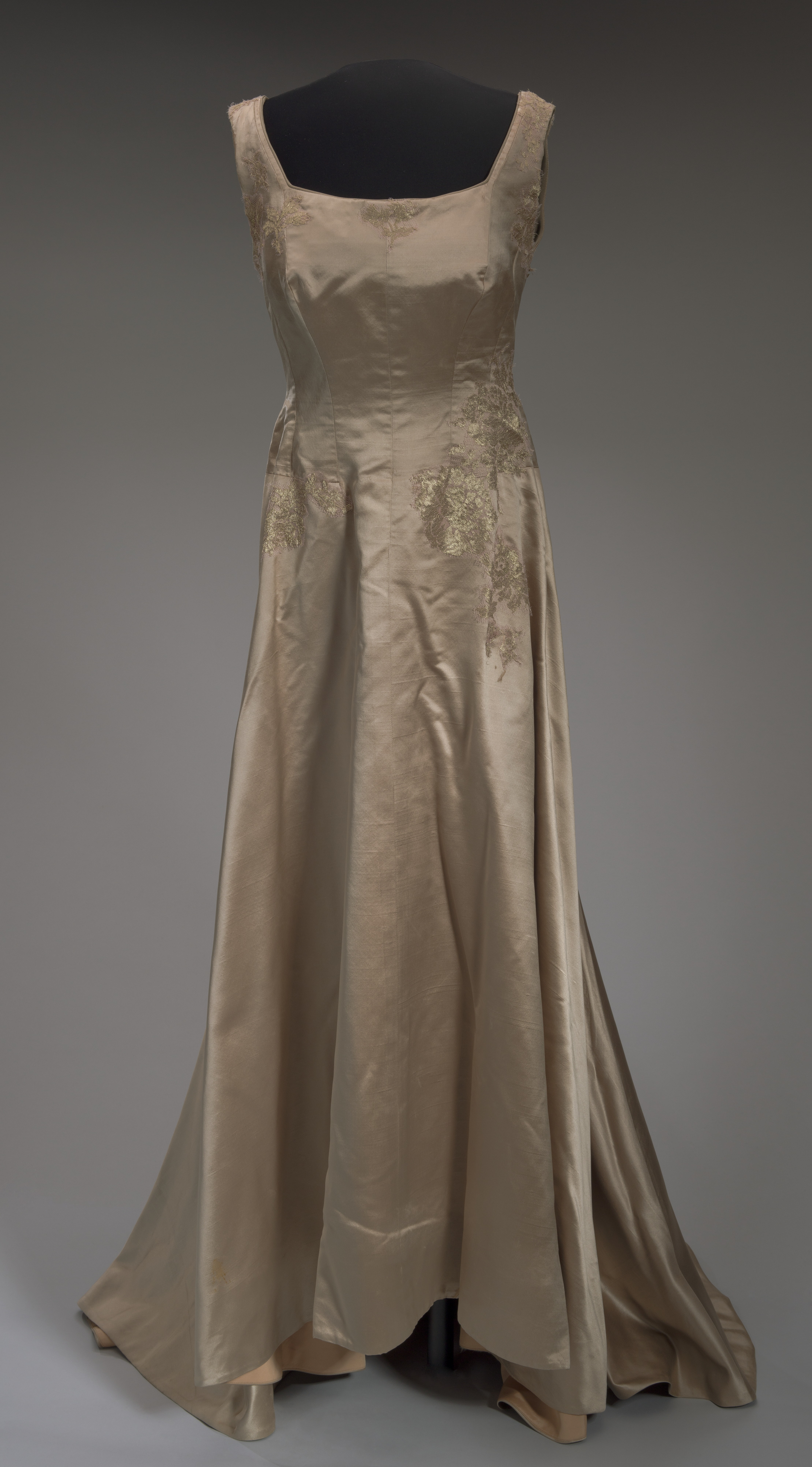
Satin gown designed by Barbara Karinska. Image and original data from the National Museum of African American History and Culture

Balanchine said, "I attribute to [Karinska] fifty percent of the success of my ballets to those that she has dressed."

Karinska collaborated with Balanchine on seventy-five ballets in all. The first ballet she made for Balanchine from her own designs was Bourrée Fantasque in 1949. In 1956, for Balanchine's Allegro Brillante, Karinska created the knee-length chiffon ballet dress, which has also become a standard design for ballet costumes. And in 2014, her costumes were recreated for a production of George Balanchine's A Midsummer Night's Dream when the original source of gold trim was found by Marc Happel, the NYC Ballet costume director, in the original shop Tinsel Trading, whose owner's grandfather had supplied Karinska in 1933. The Smithsonian has one of her other costume gowns on display.

== Honoring memory ==
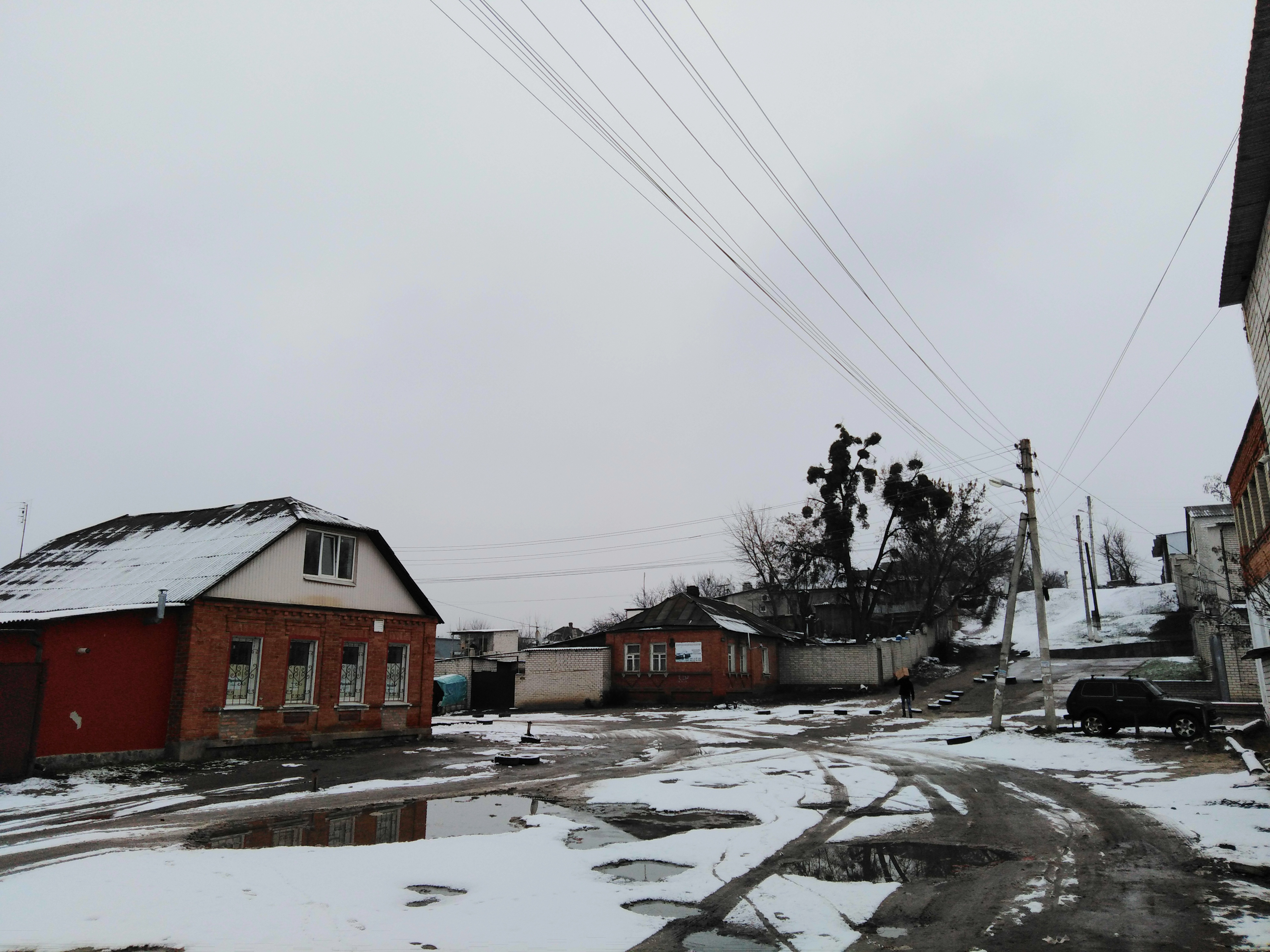
Barbara Karinska str., Kharkiv (Ukraine)

- In 1995, New York Public Library held an exhibition of the work on Balanchine and Karinska's Nutcracker, now visible online.
- In 1999, Karinska was inducted into the National Museum of Dance's Mr. & Mrs. Cornelius Vanderbilt Whitney Hall of Fame.
- In 2015, Kharkiv (Ukraine), named Barbara Karinska street (see image) in the Kyivskyi District (previously named after Marcel Cachin).
