= Pierre Vladimiroff =

Russian dancer and teacher

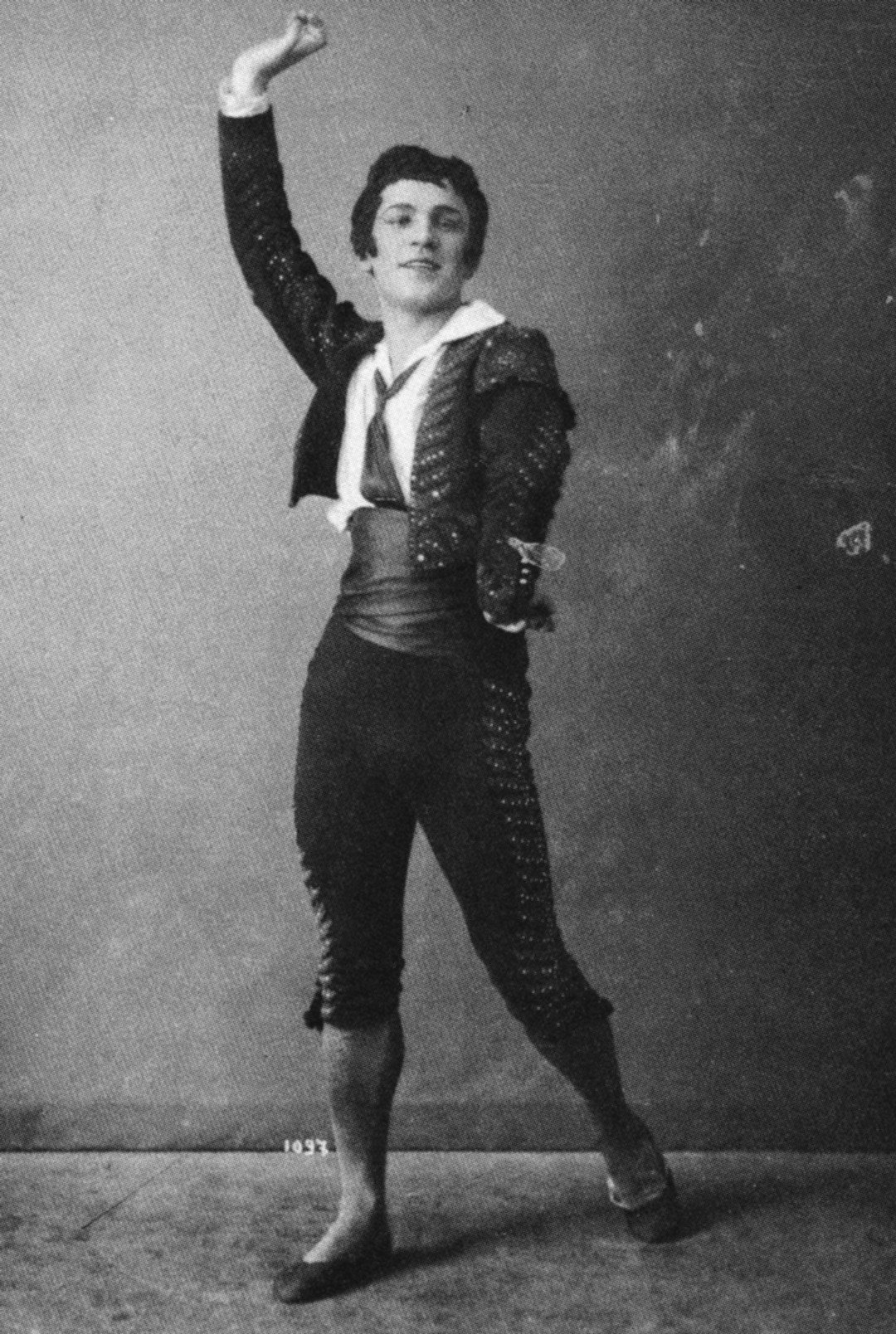
- Born: Pyotr Nikolayevich Vladimirov; February 13, 1893; Gatchina, Tsarskoselsky Uyezd, Saint Petersburg Governorate, Russian Empire
- Died: November 25, 1970 (aged 77); New York, United States

Pierre Vladimiroff, or Pyotr Nikolayevich Vladimirov (Russian: Пётр Николаевич Владимиров; February 13, 1893 – November 25, 1970), was a Russian dancer and teacher.

Vladimirov graduated from the Imperial Ballet School in 1911 and remained a member of the Imperial Ballet company until 1918. In 1915, he received the title of the first dancer.

In 1920, he and his later wife Felia Doubrovska emigrated to the West, where they joined the Ballets Russes; all roles of Vaslav Nijinsky went to Pierre Vladimiroff (Nijinsky left the Diaghilev company in 1917). He danced the prince in the 1921 production The Sleeping Princess. Later, he danced with the Mordkin Ballet and joined Anna Pavlova's company on Pavlova's last tour, becoming her last partner.

From 1934 to 1967, he taught at the School of American Ballet, being the first teacher of the newly founded school to teach the male students.

Among his students were Todd Bolender, John Taras, Willam Christensen, William Dollar, Nicholas Magallanes, Francisco Moncion, Tanaquil LeClercq, and Maria Tallchief.

He was for some time a lover of Mathilde Kschessinska, who at this time was living with Andrei Vladimirovich Romanov. Andrei Romanov called Pierre Vladimiroff to a duel and shot him in the nose.

== See also ==
- List of Russian ballet dancers
