= Suki Schorer =

American ballerina, ballet master

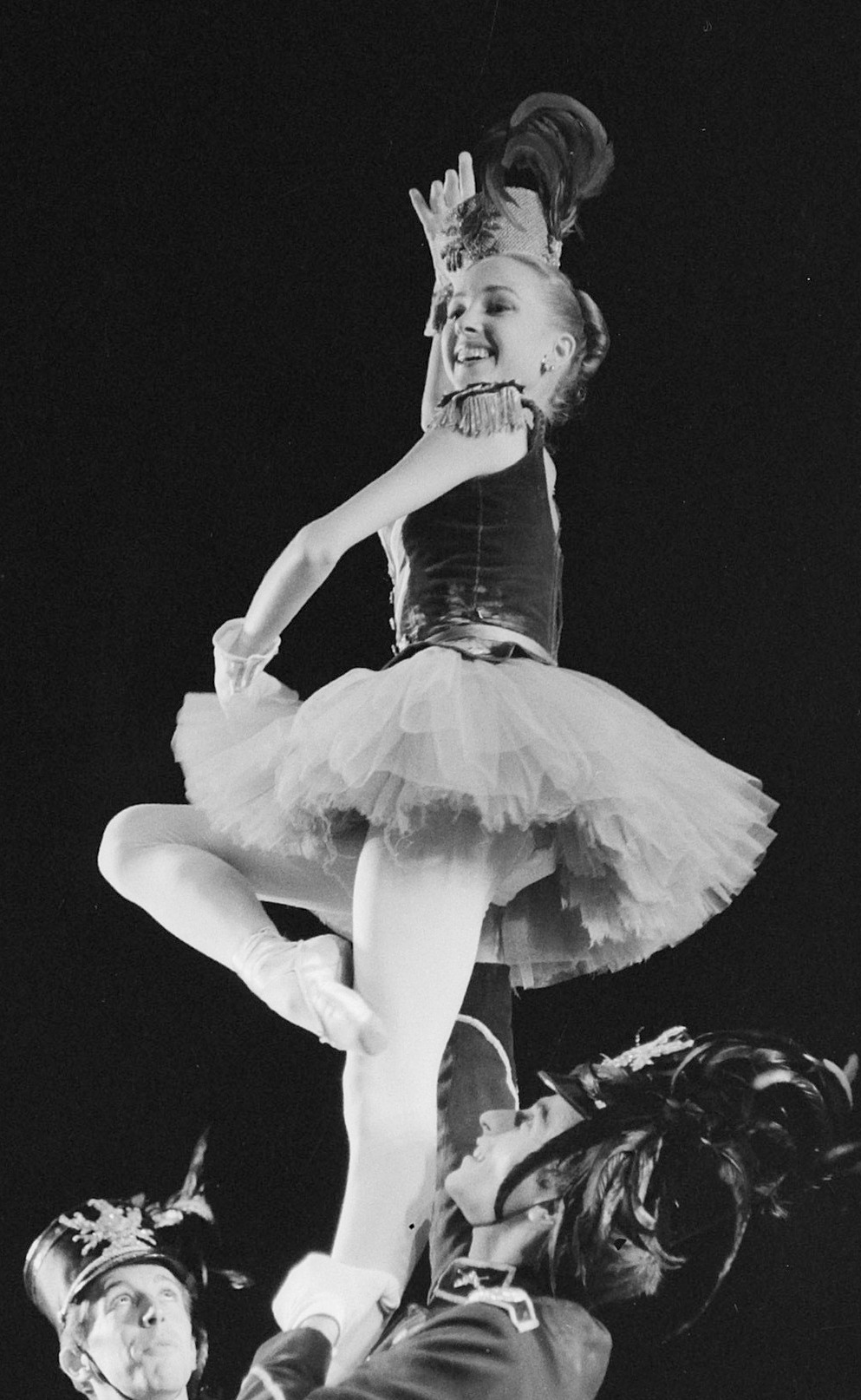
Suki Schorer in 1965

Suki Schorer is an American ballet dancer, ballet mistress, teacher, and writer. She danced with George Balanchine's New York City Ballet from 1959 to 1972. Schorer teaches at the School of American Ballet, the official school of the New York City Ballet and is a Balanchine Trust répétiteur.

== Biography ==
Suki Schorer received her early professional training at the San Francisco Ballet School and joined the San Francisco Ballet in 1956. She continued her ballet studies with Lew Christensen as a member of the company and also attended the University of California, Berkeley.

In 1959, at the invitation of George Balanchine, she joined the New York City Ballet where she took his daily classes for over a decade. In 1968, she was made a principal dancer. Her repertory included principal roles in Apollo, Serenade, Concerto Barocco, Symphony in C, Ivesiana, Stars and Stripes, Tarantella and Jewels among others. Balanchine made solo roles on her in Don Quixote, Raymonda Variations, Harlequinade, and A Midsummer Night's Dream.

Almost from the beginning of her tenure at the New York City Ballet, she began to teach at the School of American Ballet and she occasionally taught company class. Later, Mr. B asked her to teach a "newcomers" class for dancers joining the company. At his request, she toured the US as a talent scout for the School of American Ballet and assisted him in seminars for ballet teachers that were organized with support from the Ford Foundation.

On her retirement from the Company in 1972, Mr. B organized a new class of advanced girls at SAB of which she was to be the principal teacher. In 1998, she was appointed to the Brown Foundation Senior Faculty Chair at the School, which remains her principal commitment. In addition to teaching, she has staged a ballet annually for SAB's Workshop and excerpts for appearances in other venues by SAB students.

She lectures on Balanchine aesthetics and guest teaches widely in the United States and abroad (School of Bolshoi). In Europe, Scuola di Ballo del Teatro alla Scala in Milan, and Ecole de Danse de l'Opéra National de Paris.

== Publications ==
She is also a dance writer:

- contribution to Francis Mason (1991). I remember Balanchine: recollections of the ballet master by those who knew him. Doubleday. ISBN 978-0-385-26610-9.
- Suki Schorer; Society of Dance History Scholars (U.S.) (1995). Balanchine pointework. Society of Dance History Scholars. ISBN 9780965351904.
- 1999 : Suki Schorer on Balanchine Technique, Knopf. In 2000 winner of de la Torre Bueno Prize, translated in French and in Italian. A Japanese edition is in progress.
- contribution to Lise Friedman; Suki Schorer (1999). First Lessons in Ballet. Workman Pub. ISBN 978-0-7611-1352-2.
- contribution to Costas (2009). Balanchine: Celebrating a Life in Dance. Tide-Mark Press, Limited. ISBN 978-1-55949-847-0.
- contribution to Barbara Newman (2004). Grace under pressure: passing dance through time. Dance Books. ISBN 978-1-85273-099-4.
- Suki Schorer; School of American Ballet (2005). Put Your Best Foot Forward: A Young Dancer's Guide to Life. Workman Publishing. ISBN 978-0-7611-3795-5.
- contribution to Anne Hogan (2008). "Suki Schorer in conversation with Ann Hogan". Balanchine then and now. Sylph Editions. pp. 101–109. ISBN 9780955296390.

== Videography ==
- 1992 : Music for ballet class- Intermediate Pointe Class, VHS/DVD Bodarc Productions
- 1995 : The Balanchine Essays – series of 9 VHS/DVDs –, The Balanchine Library. Nonesuch, 1995–96. Analysis of details of Balanchine's approach to classical technique, with Merrill Ashley
- 1997 :Marie-Jeanne coaching Concerto Barocco with John Taras and Suki Schorer VHS. The G.Balanchine Foundation
- 1997 : Encore VHS/DVD – Ballet Pointe class, Bodarc Productions
- 1998 : Balanchine lives! – Arte – VHS
- 1999 : contribution to Antonina Tumkovsky – 50 years at the School of American Ballet, VHS/DVD – SAB
- 2001 : Living a Ballet Dream: Six Dancers Tell Their Stories – Richard Blanshard – SAB
- 2003 : Legends – Beginning Pointe Class, VHS, Bodarc Productions
- 2008 : School of American Ballet, serving the classical vision DVD – SAB
- 2008 : Bringing Balanchine back DVD

== Awards ==
- 1992 : Who's Who in America.
- 1997 : Distinguished Teacher in the Arts – National Foundation for the Advancement of the Arts.
- 1998 : Dance Magazine Award.
- 2000 : De la Torre Bueno Prize
- 2001 : Century Association of New York

== Bibliography ==
- Bernard Taper (1996). Balanchine, a Biography. University of California Press. ISBN 978-0-520-20639-7.
- Jennifer Dunning (1985). "But First a School": The First Fifty Years of the School of American Ballet. Viking. ISBN 978-0-670-80407-8.
- La tecnica e lo stile di Balanchine, Carla Wertenstein, Accademia nazionale di danza, Roma 2007
- Bill Smoot (2010). Conversations with Great Teachers. Indiana University Press. p. 86. ISBN 978-0-253-00432-1.
