= American Ballet =

Professional ballet company in the US

The American Ballet was the first professional ballet company George Balanchine created in the United States. The company was founded with the help of Lincoln Kirstein and Edward Warburg, managed by Alexander Merovitch and populated by students of Kirstein and Balanchine's School of American Ballet. Having failed to mount a tour, American Ballet began performing at the Old Met. After being allowed to stage only two dance performances (Orfeo ed Euridice) in 1936 and an evening of dances choreographed to the music of Igor Stravinsky in 1937), Balanchine moved the company to Hollywood in 1938. The company was restarted as the American Ballet Caravan and toured North and South America, although it too folded after several years.

== See also ==
- New York City Ballet
