= Kansas City Jazz Orchestra =

- Short name: KCJO
- Founded: 2003
- Concert hall: Kauffman Center for the Performing Arts
- Website: kcjo.org

The Kansas City Jazz Orchestra (KCJO) is a not-for-profit 501(c)(3) big band jazz orchestra based in the Kansas City metropolitan area and part of the Kansas City jazz music scene.

== History ==
The Kansas City Jazz Orchestra was founded by Jim Mair and Gene Hall in Kansas City in May 2003 after being inspired by similar jazz orchestras across the United States, though it was primarily modeled after the Columbus Jazz Orchestra. Jim's wife, Mary Mair, was also integral in getting the orchestra started. Mary Mair took the helm as the first executive director.

The Kansas City Jazz Orchestra had their debut performance was in 2003. They began with theme-based concerts and a two-concert subscription season.

In the beginning of the orchestra's performing schedule, they regularly drew audiences of up to 1,000 people. "Our vision for the Kansas City Jazz Orchestra is to be on the same cultural plane as the symphony, the ballet, and the Lyric opera", said Mair when elaborating on a strategy to grow the orchestra and attract young audiences and musicians. To that end, the orchestra incorporated youth outreach and education into their strategy, an initiative entitled JazzWorks! They co-sponsored the third annual Kansas City Kansas Community College Jazz Camp and held clinics at Kansas City schools.

By 2008, the orchestra was an 18-piece band. They connected with audiences through their tributes to Duke Ellington, Stan Kenton, Benny Goodman, Frank Sinatra, Mel Tormé, Woody Herman, and even Kansas City jazz great Count Basie. They had played at Unity Temple on the Kansas City Plaza for most of their concerts, but after 5 years they grew to the Folly Theater as well. As of 2018, the concert season is held at the large Kauffman Center for the Performing Arts.

Since spring of 2013 the orchestra is directed by Clint Ashlock, who succeeded Kerry Strayer.

The orchestra embarked on its first international tour in May 2018, performing at the Swinging Hannover festival in Germany and other concerts in Poland.

== Discography ==
- Take One 2005
- Live on the Plaza 2007
- Rhapsody 2016
