= Captain Jinks of the Horse Marines =

Opera

- Opera by Jack Beeson
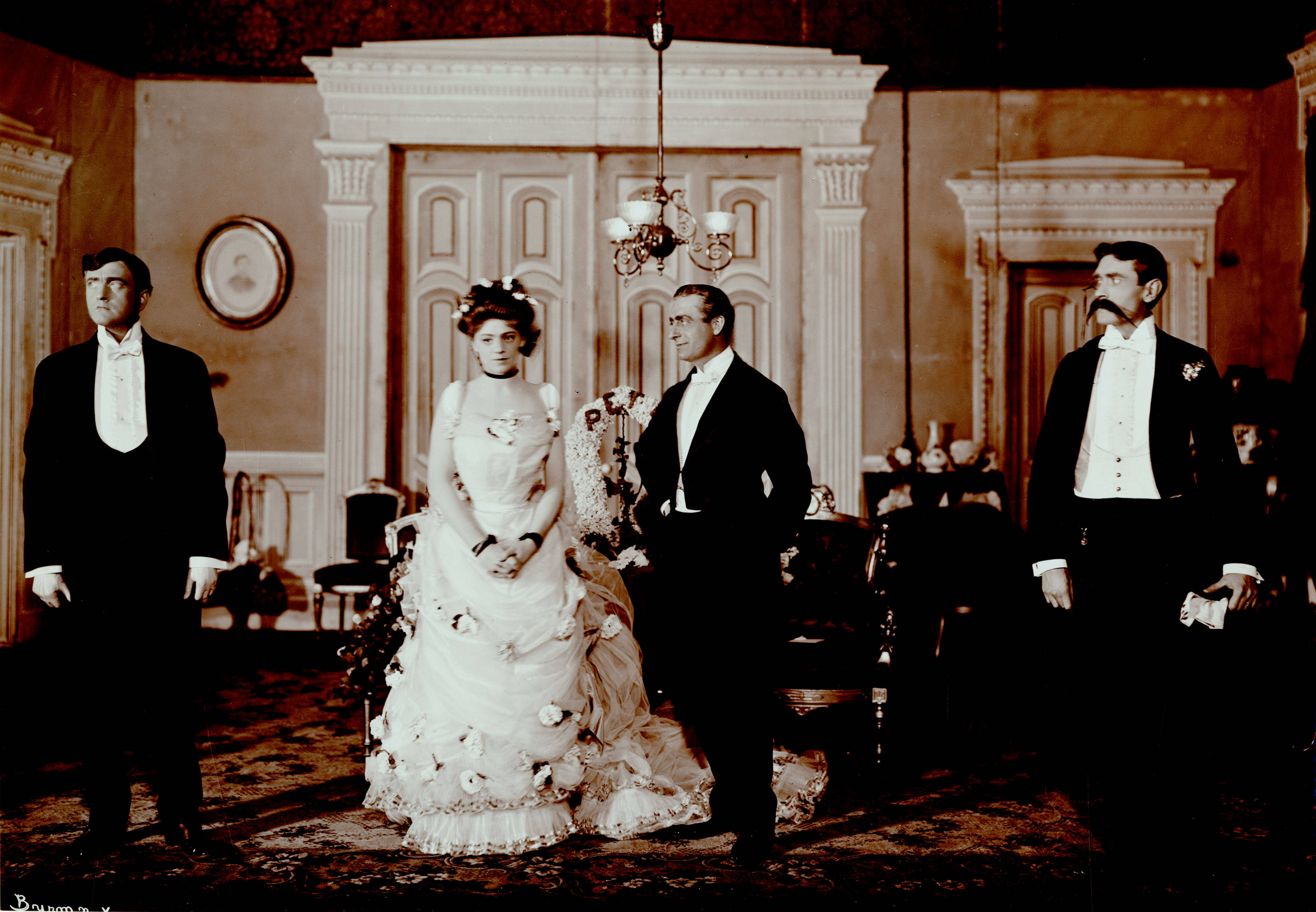
- A scene from "Captain Jinks," which opened July 1, 1907, at the Grand Theater, Seattle
- Librettist: Sheldon Harnick
- Based on: Captain Jinks of the Horse Marines by Clyde Fitch
- Premiere: 20 September 1975; Lyric Theater, Kansas City, Missouri

Captain Jinks of the Horse Marines is an opera in three acts by Jack Beeson written in 1975 to a libretto by Sheldon Harnick after the 1901 play of the same name by Clyde Fitch. The play had previously been adapted for a 1916 silent film.

The world premiere was September 20, 1975, at the Lyric Theater, Kansas City, Missouri directed and choreographed by Jack Eddleman and conducted by Russell Patterson. It was produced by the Lyric Opera of Kansas City. A recording of the original cast was published in 2010 by Albany Records.

== Synopsis ==
Jonathan Jinks and his friends Salty Sam and Charlie go to welcome opera star Aurelia Trentoni. Charlie, jealous of Jinks's success with women, provokes him into betting he can seduce Aurelia. They are immediately attracted to one another. Ashamed of the bet, Jinks tries to cancel it. Unsuccessful, he gives Charlie an IOU. In an attempt to speed Aurelia's luggage through Customs, Jinks offers money to an inspector. He is surprised as he is arrested for bribing a U.S. official.

Jinks, out on bail, becomes secretly engaged to Aurelia. "Papa" Belliarti, Aurelia's uncle and teacher, enters with Charlie. Charlie, presenting the IOU, claims Jinks is a fortune hunter who has wagered he would marry Aurelia. Belliarti forbids Jinks to see Aurelia again.

Aurelia returns from her triumphant debut in La traviata too distressed to attend the party given in her honor. Jinks appears, explains what has happened, and begs forgiveness. A policeman arrives looking for Jinks, who has missed his trial. Aurelia, playing the dying Violetta for the second time that evening, explains that Jinks was helping her to survive a recurrence of an old lung complaint. All the principals enter, bringing the party to Aurelia, and all ends happily.

== Roles ==
- Colonel Mapleson (Basso Cantante)
- Reporter from The Times (Irish Tenor)
- Reporter from The Tribune (Tenor)
- Reporter from The Sun (Baritone)
- Reporter from The Herald (Baritone)
- Reporter from The Clipper (Bass)
- Sam Van Bleecker (Bass Baritone)
- Charles LaMartine (Baritone)
- Jonathan Jinks (Tenor)
- Mrs Greenborough (Mrs Gee) (Contralto and pianist, if possible)
- Aurelia Trentoni (Lyric coloratura Soprano)
- "Papa" Belliarti (Lyric Baritone and violinist if possible)
- Mary ("Annina") (Soprano)
- Mrs Stonington (Dramatic Soprano)
- Miss Merriam (deaf-mute)
- Policeman (Buffo Bass)
- Customs official (Buffo Bass)
- Mrs Jinks (Jonathan's mother) (Mezzo-soprano)
- Stage doorman (role doubled by customs official) (Buffo Bass)
- Stagehand/scene-painter (role doubled by policeman) (Buffo Bass)
- Bandmaster, bandsmen (from the orchestra)
- 3 or 4 dancing couples
- Stagehands, sailors, stevedores
- 3 dogs
