= Tatiana Dokoudovska =

French ballet dancer (1921–2005)

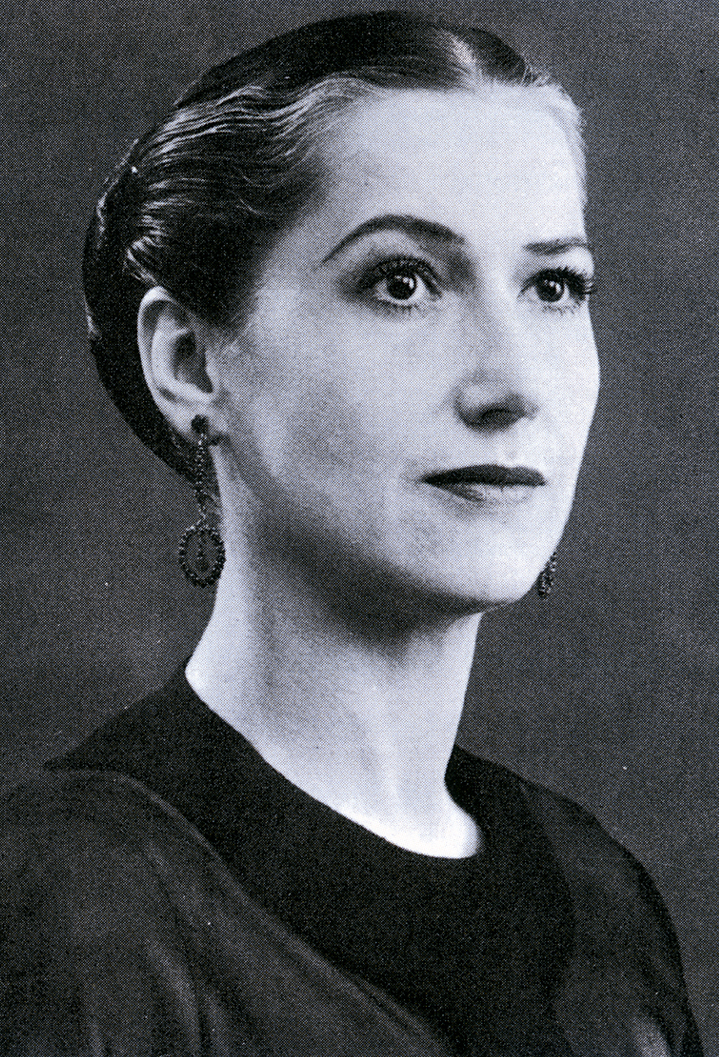
- Tatiana Dokoudovska
- Born: 13 January 1921; Beausoleil, Alpes-Maritimes
- Died: 21 September 2005 (aged 84); Kansas City, Missouri, U.S.
- Resting place: Forest Hill Calvary Cemetery; Kansas City, Missouri, U.S. 39.0032310°N 94.5680618°W
- Occupations: Dancer; choreographer; dance teacher; artistic director
- Years active: 1933–1989
- Known for: Dancer, teacher. Founder and teacher of the Kansas City Ballet

Tatiana Dokoudovska (13 January 1921 – 21 September 2005) was a French ballet dancer, choreographer and ballet master of Russian origin. She founded the Kansas City Ballet in 1957 and was the company's first artistic director.

== Biography ==
Tatiana Dokoudovska was born on 13 January 1921 in Beausoleil, France, near Monte Carlo, from Alexis and Nadia Dokoudovskaya. Her father was the son of a Russian nobleman; her mother's Italian father, Leopold Lazzarini, was an opera tenor. Her father's family had fled Russia during the Russian revolution.

Her father, who had lost everything following the revolution, drove a taxi while in Monte Carlo. Her mother had been studying to be a doctor, but had to quit when the family lost their fortune.

Dokoudovska experienced many illnesses during childhood, including tonsilitis, rheumatic fever, burst appendix, dislocated toes, and pneumonia.

The family moved to Paris, joining a community of exiled Russians (nobility and military).

A student of Olga Preobrajenska, prima ballerina of the Russian Imperial Theatre, Dokoudovska at the age of 12 started her professional career, dancing in operettas and films. While attending the Ecole des Artes (Professional School), she danced for the lyric season in Monte Carlo, then was hired as a soloist by the Ballet Russe de l'Opera Comique in Paris.

In 1939 she immigrated to the United States on an refuge passport and joined the Mordkin Ballet, with which she toured and spent a season in New York City, continuing with the company that would later be called the American Ballet Theatre. She then danced at Radio City Music Hall.

Following World War II, she returned to Europe to dance with the Ballet Russe at Covent Garden in London, surviving on "small portions of meat and one egg a month," according to an interview with The Kansas City Star.

She came back to the United States and became an American citizen.

In 1954, while performing at Starlight Theatre in Kansas City, Missouri, she was offered a teaching position with the Conservatory of Music of Kansas City (precursor to UMKC Conservatory) by Wiktor Labunski, after he saw her give a television interview.

She was called "Miss Tania" by her students. Dokoudovska became head of the dance department and was a strict disciplinarian: when classes started the doors were locked and no one was admitted. Talking was not allowed, nor bathroom break. Dancers stayed in fifth position between exercises.

The conservatory could not afford an accompanist for classes, so Dokoudovska used a stick to strike the floor and keep time for the dancers.

The first performance of the Kansas City Ballet was on April 30, 1957 at the Victoria Theater (former Lyric Theatre, now a YMCA.) The first performance included the Chopin-Fokine "Les Sylphides;" Michael Fokine's "Ruse D'Amour," adapted by Dokoudovska; a set of divertissements; a modern dance piece choreographed by Conservatory colleague Howard Vogel; and an excerpt from Act III of Tchaikovsky's "Sleeping Beauty." The performance was repeated at Wyandotte High School in Kansas City, Kansas on May 1, 1957.

Dokoudovska invited dancers with the New York City Ballet to perform in Kansas City (Civic) Ballet recitals. "The performances of dancers such as Jacques d'Ambroise, Melissa Hayden, Edward Villella, Gelsey Kirkland and other set standards of the aspiring local dancers," wrote Dory DeAngelo, former stage manager with the Kansas City Civic Ballet in the 1960s.

In 1977, she stepped down artistic director of KCB so she could concentrate on teaching.

Dokoudovska retired from the UMKC Conservatory of Music in 1989.

She died on 21 September 2005. She is buried at Forest Hill Calvary Cemetery in Kansas City.

== Notes ==
Her brother Vladimir "The Duke" Dokoudovsky was also a noted ballet dancer and teacher in New York.

Dokoudovska was succeeded as artistic director of Kansas City Ballet by Todd Bolender.

== See also ==
- List of Russian ballet dancers

== Sources ==
- "Tatiana Dokoudovska". Kansas City Ballet.
- "Obituary: Tatiana Dokoudovska". Kansas City Star. 22 September 2005.
- "The way back to dance through Tatiana Dakoudovska". 26 July 2015.

== Bibliography ==
- Wyatt Townley & Jacques D'Amboise (2007). Kansas City Ballet : the first fifty years. Kansas City: Rockhill Books.
- State Ballet of Missouri; Muriel McBrien Kauffman Foundation (1995). A salute to Todd Bolender. Kansas City: State Ballet of Missouri.
