= Kauffman Center for the Performing Arts =

American performing arts center

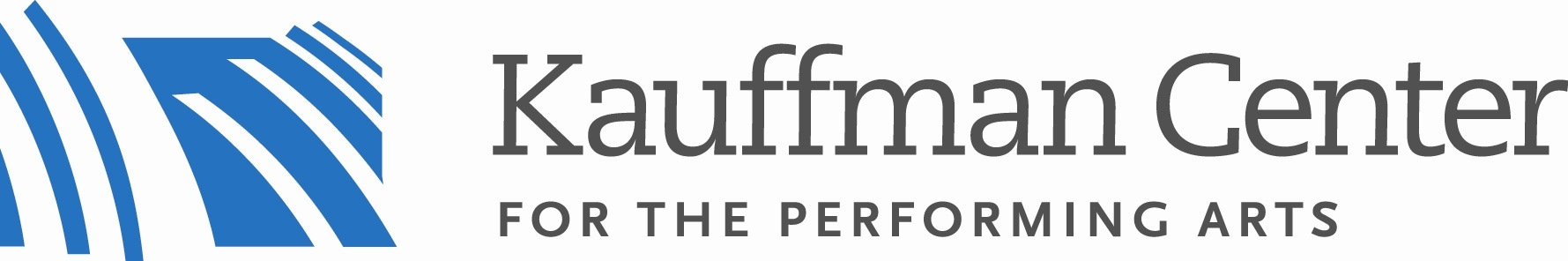

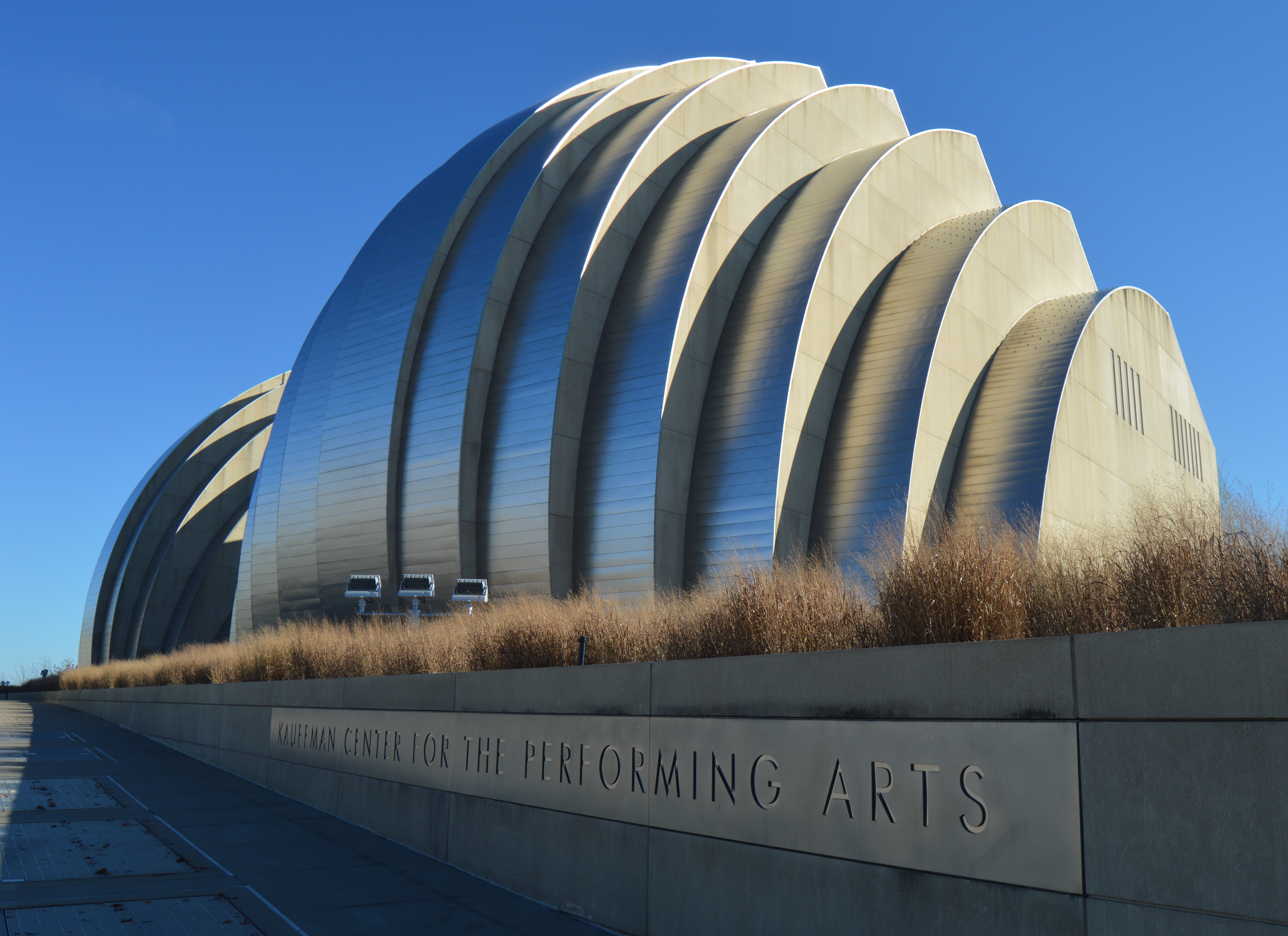
- Interactive map of Kauffman Center for the Performing Arts
- Address: 1601 Broadway; Kansas City, Missouri; United States
- Coordinates: 39.093698°N 94.586824°W
- Capacity: Helzberg Hall: 1,600; Muriel Kauffman Theatre: 1,800
- Type: Performing arts center
- Public transit: KC Streetcar: Kauffman Center

Construction
- Opened: September 16, 2011
- Architect: Moshe Safdie

Website
- www.kauffmancenter.org

The Kauffman Center for the Performing Arts is in downtown Kansas City, Missouri, USA, at 16th and Broadway, near the city's Power & Light District, the T-Mobile Center and the Crossroads Arts District. Opened in 2011, it houses two venues: the 1,800-seat Muriel Kauffman Theatre, home of the Kansas City Ballet and Lyric Opera of Kansas City; and the 1,600-seat Helzberg Hall, home of the Kansas City Symphony Orchestra. Both venues host a variety of artists and performance groups in addition to these three resident entities.

Construction of the Kauffman Center played a large part in the redevelopment of downtown Kansas City. The project was launched under the 501(c)(3) non-profit laws but, unlike some other civic-construction initiatives, did not use taxpayer funds. The Center operates to this day as a 501(c)(3) non-profit organization. The City of Kansas City contributed to and operates the large adjacent parking garage. Before 2011 the three resident entities performed at the Lyric Theatre, eight blocks to the north.

== Construction ==
=== Origins ===
Muriel Kauffman first discussed her idea for a performing arts center in Kansas City with her family and the community in 1994. After her death the following year, her daughter and chairman of the Muriel McBrien Kauffman Foundation, Julia Irene Kauffman, began to move the project forward. A feasibility study was conducted in 1997; it resulted in a report that gave Julia Irene Kauffman and the rest of the board a practical foundation on which they could begin to build Muriel Kauffman's vision.

In 1999, the Muriel McBrien Kauffman Foundation purchased an 18.5-acre plot of land just south of the central business district. The Foundation announced that this site would be the home of the proposed performing arts center. By 2000, the then-named Metropolitan Kansas City Performing Arts Center board had narrowed down the pool of potential architects to four. They ultimately chose Moshe Safdie, an award-winning modernist known for such buildings as Habitat 67 in Montreal, Canada; the Khalsa Heritage Centre in India; the Marina Bay Sands resort in Singapore; and the Crystal Bridges Museum of American Art in Bentonville, Arkansas. Soon after, he arrived in Kansas City to see the site for himself, and while at dinner with Julia Irene Kauffman he sketched an idea for the center on his napkin. Soon, that sketch would evolve into an architectural icon and the home for performing arts in Kansas City.

Safdie presented his plan in May 2002, and four years later, on October 6, 2006, ground was broken for what had now been officially named the Kauffman Center for the Performing Arts.

=== Design and construction ===
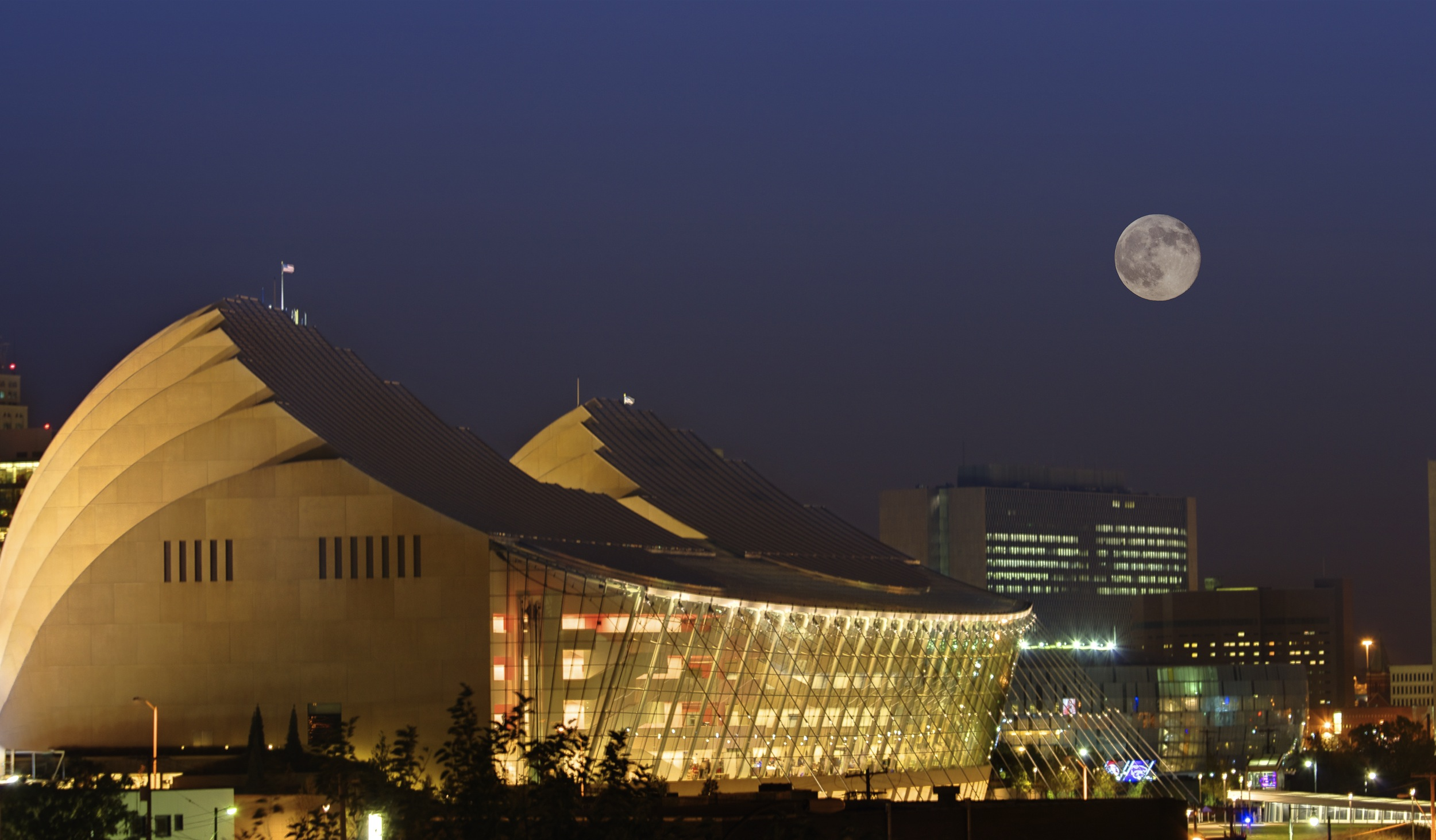
Kauffman Center for the Performing Arts

The technical requirements and exacting standards required of a facility like the Kauffman Center made it one of the most complex structures in the world to design and build. The building, which took nearly five years to complete, contains 40,000 square feet of glass, 25,000 cubic yards of concrete, and 27 steel cables. The main lobby, Brandmeyer Great Hall, is built of a glass ceiling and sloping glass walls that provide a panoramic view of Kansas City to the south. The twenty-seven steel cables on the south façade are anchored in embeds that weigh approximately one and a half tons, and the embeds are an extension of the foundation and bedrock beneath the building. When the steel cables were pulled taut during the construction process, the entire steel structure shifted two to six inches to the south. This tensioning provides stability to the structure and keeps the glass lobby securely in place. The Kauffman Center covers 13 acres (53,000 m2), including landscaped grounds over the 1,000-space, city-owned Arts District Garage. The cost of the project was approximately $413 million, which includes both a $40 million operating endowment and the city's $47 million construction of the parking garage. The Kauffman Center was designed by lead architect Moshe Safdie, acoustician Yasuhisa Toyota, theater consultant Theatre Projects Consultants and Richard Pilbrow, and engineering firm Arup. Local firm BNIM was the associate architect. Lead contractor was J.E. Dunn Construction Group of Kansas City.

=== Architecture ===
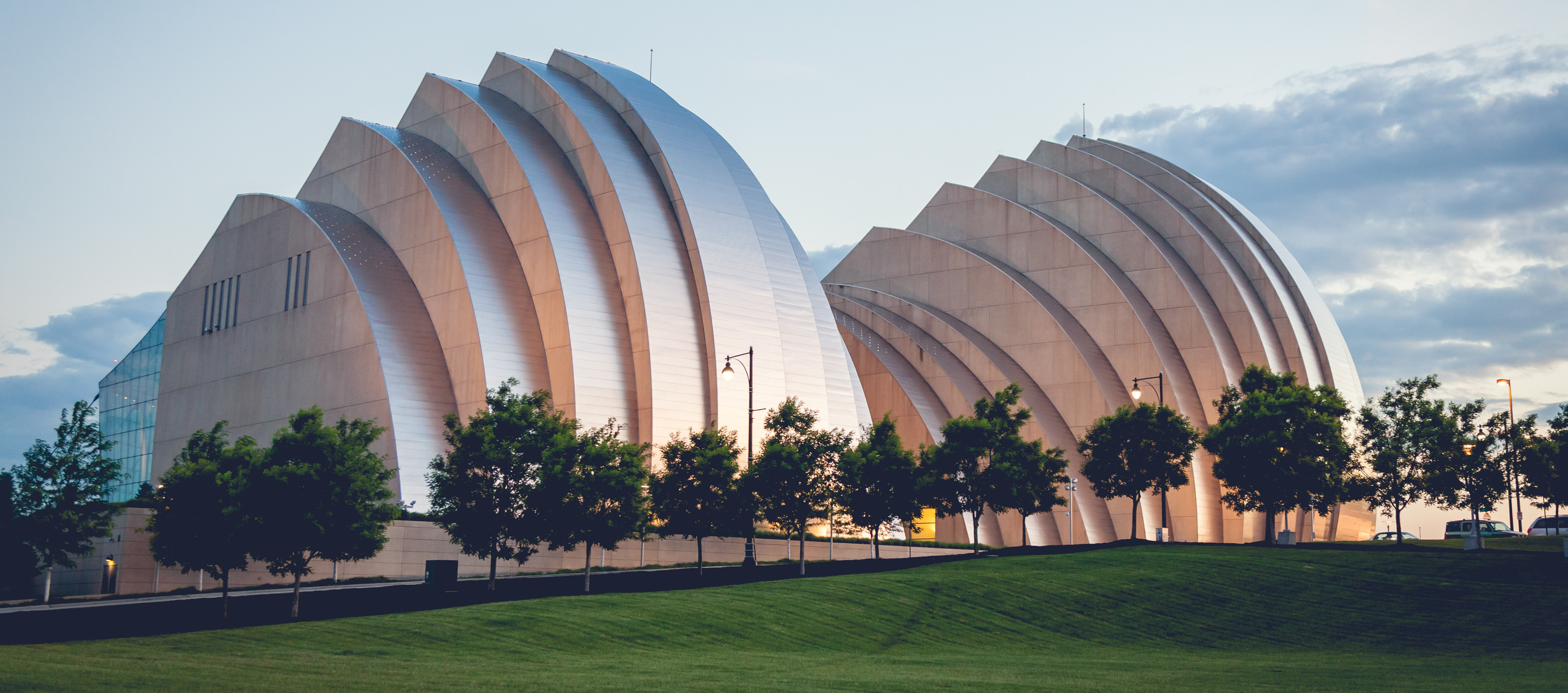
The Kauffman Center is visible from the Kansas City Convention Center.

The center's exterior consists of two symmetrical half shells of vertical, concentric arches that open toward the south. Each shell houses one acoustically independent performance venue, although the backstage area is shared. The south façade of the Center is made entirely of glass. Safdie describes the lobby as "an expansive glazed porch contained by a glass tent-like structure". For those inside Brandmeyer Great Hall, the glass puts Kansas City on display; for those on the outside, the Kauffman Center becomes like a terrarium, revealing the thousands of attendees backlit against the white interior.

== Performance facilities ==
The 285,000-square-foot (26,500 m^{2}) Kauffman Center for the Performing Arts houses two performance halls: Muriel Kauffman Theatre and Helzberg Hall. The venues share backstage space that runs the entire length of the Kauffman Center. There are dressing rooms that can accommodate more than 250 performers, along with 11 rehearsal rooms. The Kauffman Center joins the Lincoln Center as another of the few performing arts centers in the country to have two (or more) performance venues in one building. Another example is the Kennedy Center in Washington, D.C.

This decision to have two halls, each tailored to a specific purpose, rather than a multipurpose building, reminded many Kansas City residents of a similar decision in the 1970s—when Ewing Kauffman and city officials decided to build separate stadiums for the Kansas City Chiefs and the Kansas City Royals, rather than a single arena for both. The lobby features floor-to-ceiling windows, refreshment stands, gift shop, and staircases.

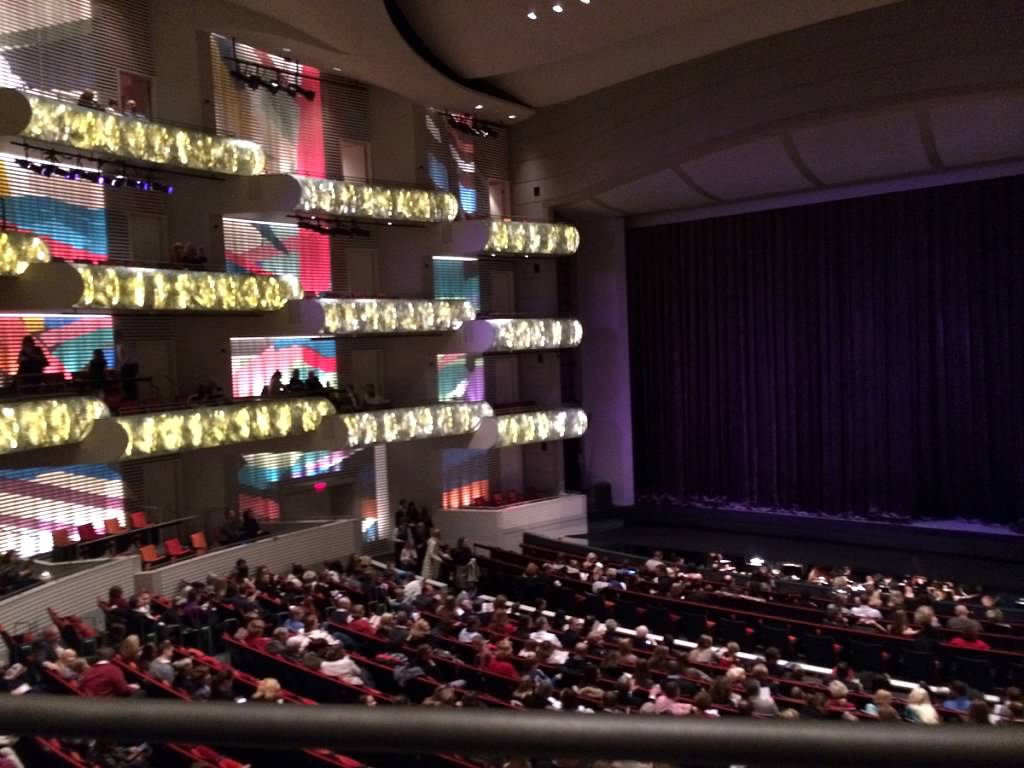
View of the Muriel Kauffman Theater from the mezzanine level

The Muriel Kauffman Theatre is a 1,800-seat theater whose design was inspired by the great European opera houses. With multiple balconies and box seating on either side of the theater, attendees are much closer to the stage than in most other auditorium-type venues. The balconies and boxes, which feature seats covered in various shades of red, also boast balustrades that glimmer with gold lighting and dim when the performance begins. The undulating walls of the theatre are painted with a brightly colored mural, designed and carried out by students at the Kansas City Art Institute, under the guidance of Moshe Safdie. With a 5,000-square-foot stage, an orchestra pit that can house up to 90 musicians, and a 74-foot tall fly tower, Muriel's Theatre is the performance home of the Kansas City Ballet and the Lyric Opera of Kansas City, as well as the site of many other theatrical, musical, and dance productions. Another feature of the Muriel Kauffman Theatre is the installation of the Figaro Simultext Seatback System, which displays subtitles in various languages on the backs of chairs, as opposed to most other opera houses that require the audience to look above the stage for opera translations.

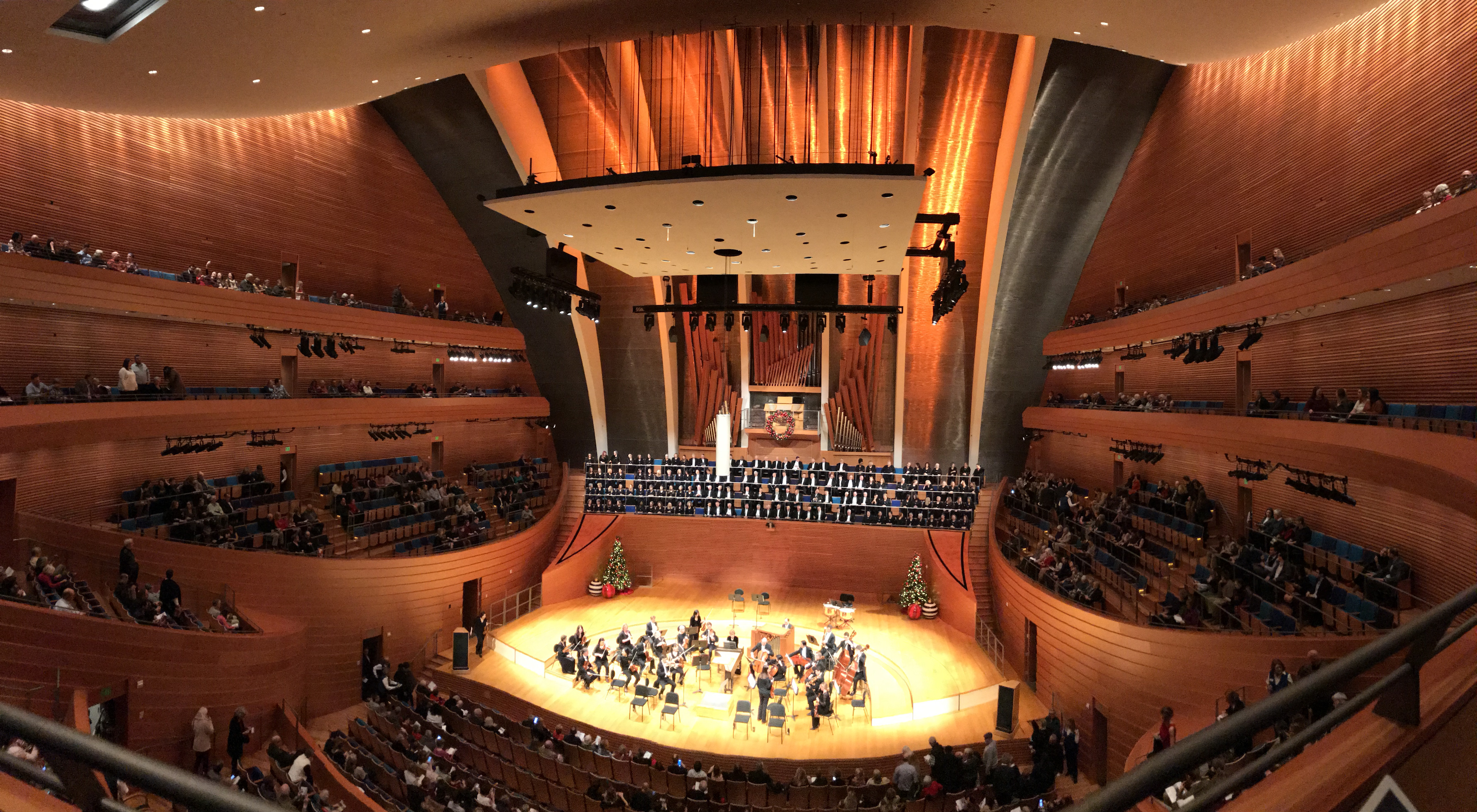
The Kansas City Symphony prepares to begin their annual performance of Handel's Messiah in Helzberg Hall.

Helzberg Hall is a 1,600-seat, oval-shaped concert hall, and it is the performance home to the Kansas City Symphony. Because the stage extends into approximately one-third of the space, even the seat farthest from the stage is a mere 100 feet away. Helzberg Hall features vineyard-style seating on all four sides of the stage, adding to the intimate feel of the space. Safdie explains it thus: "From the outset, we wanted a hall that was intimate and in which the public is engaged with the musicians in a feeling of embrace." Within the stage itself are motorized risers, which can either lie flat or rise into a tier, depending on the needs of the performance. Helzberg Hall also houses a 79-stop, 102-rank pipe organ built by the firm Casavant Frères in Saint-Hyacinthe, Quebec, Canada. Fewer than 10 percent of the 5,548 pipes are visible to those in the hall. The largest pipe is 32 feet tall and weighs approximately 960 pounds. After the two-month installation process, and an additional two-month tuning period, the organ was dedicated on March 10, 2012 with a special concert by James David Christie.

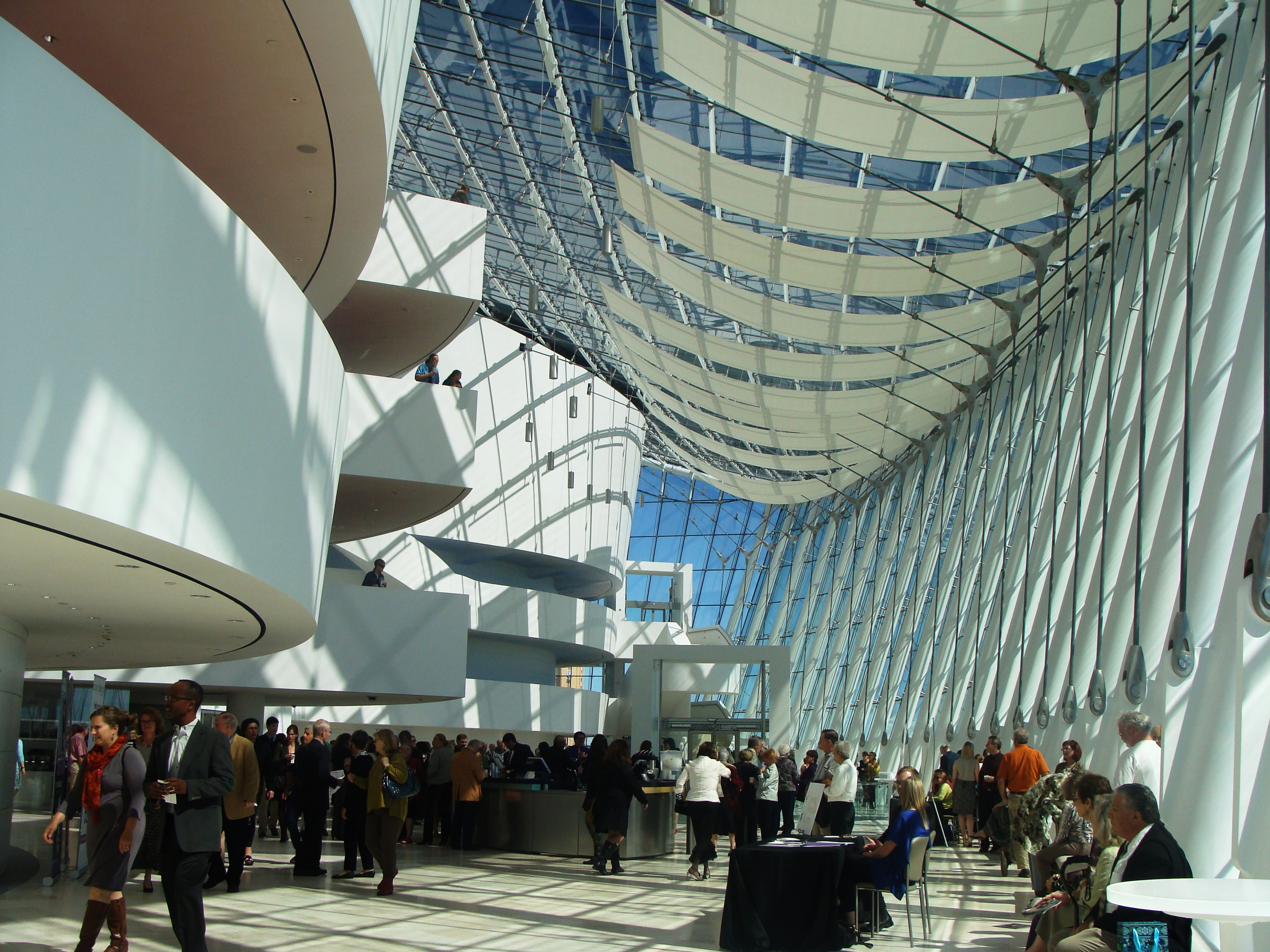
View of the Great Hall

Brandmeyer Great Hall links Muriel Kauffman Theatre and Helzberg Hall, and features an expansive view of the Kansas City skyline to the south. It serves as a lobby for patrons on performance nights and is also available for special events. The white great hall provides access to the performance halls by a series of stacking, open balconies. This means that on performance nights, patrons attending events in either hall are visible to each other, and to the city below.

== Partnerships ==
The Kauffman Center for the Performing Arts also provides partnership opportunities for local, regional, and student organizations in the Kansas City area. In the inaugural season, such partnerships included the Kansas City Friends of Alvin Ailey, the Harriman-Jewell Series, the Heartland Men's Chorus, the Kansas City Broadway Series, Kansas City Friends of Chamber Music, the University of Missouri – Kansas City Conservatory of Music and Dance Artist Series, The Kansas City Jazz Orchestra, the Youth Symphony of Kansas City, and Starlight Children's Theatre.

== Education ==
The Kauffman Center's Open Doors Program is an educational program and community initiative that gives schools across the Kansas City metropolitan area the opportunity to bring children to the Kauffman Center. Through the Open Doors Transportation Fund, donations help make the cost of bringing children to performances at the Kauffman Center more affordable. Through the Open Doors Tickets Fund, donations help offset the cost of tickets for various events at the Kauffman Center, in order to provide free or low-cost performing arts experiences for program recipients supported by select non-profit agencies.

On February 13, 2012, The Grammy Museum announced that it would debut its Music Revolution Program at the Kauffman Center for the Performing Arts in June 2012.

== Arts District Garage ==
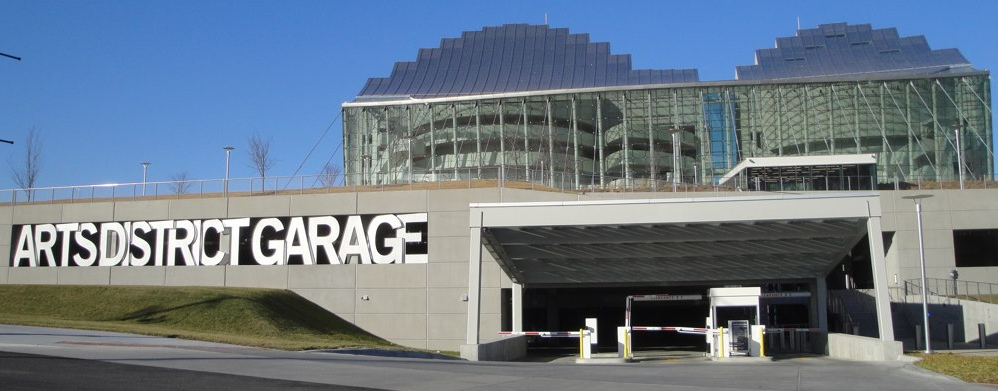

Adjacent to the south side of the Kauffman Center is the city-owned and operated Arts District garage. The $47 million project was paid for in bonds. It provides covered parking for Kauffman Center attendees, with entrances on 17th Street and Wyandotte Street. Spaces for parking and charging are reserved for electric cars. The roof of the garage doubles as the landscaping for the Kauffman Center. It required 300,000 pieces of high-density foam, 3,000 tons of sand mixture, and 100,000 square feet of sod. The eco-friendly green roof was designed and constructed by local landscape architect Jeffrey L. Bruce & Company. Construction projects typically disrupt the natural ecosystem of green spaces, so Bruce and his team worked to re-establish the sustainability of the new front lawn, which consists of fescue and Reveille, a low-water-use grass. It is an area for outdoor events, and the garage's green roof reduces the destructive heat inherent to more traditional paved lots.

=== Terpsichore ===
As a part of the City of Kansas City's One Percent for Art ordinance, a mixed media art installation called "Terpsichore for Kansas City" was placed in the Arts District garage. Named after the Muse in Greek mythology who ruled over choral song and dance, the installation is a combination of original musical compositions played over speakers in the ceiling and a four-story "light organ". The light organ consists of seven acrylic tubes that encase a series of LED lights, which move in sync with the music overhead.

== See also ==
- List of concert halls
