= Todd Bolender Center for Dance and Creativity =

Coordinates: 39°05′01″N 94°35′25″W

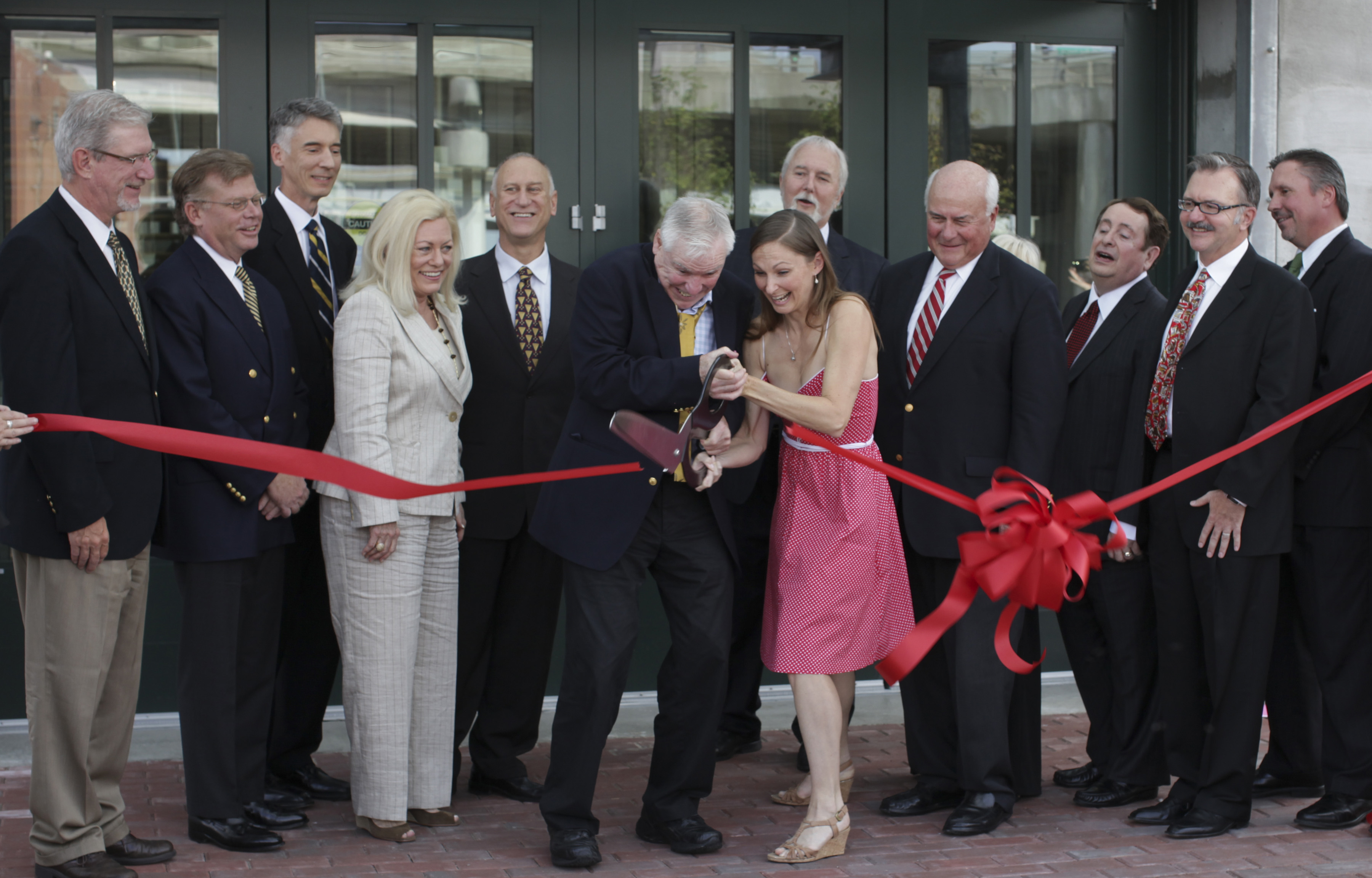
The Todd Bolender Center for Dance & Creativity, grand opening in August 2011. Julia Irene Kauffman in white suit with William Whitener to her left.

The Todd Bolender Center for Dance and Creativity, named after the late Todd Bolender, is located in what used to be the Union Station Power House in Kansas City, Missouri. It opened on August 26, 2011. Following extensive renovations on the historic building, it became home for the Kansas City Ballet.

== Building history ==
The Union Station Power House was originally designed in 1913 by Union Station architect Jarvis Hunt. The Power House which supplied coal powered energy to the Station and other buildings was completed in 1914.

== Construction ==
Ground was broken on November 13, 2009 and was completed in the summer of 2011. The renovations used the 65,000 square feet (6,000 m^{2}) of space to create seven studios, including the 180-seat Michael and Ginger Frost Studio Theater. The building design includes areas for production, wardrobe/costume, physical therapy, storage, artist locker rooms and administration. BNIM Architects were challenged with adapting the Power House structure into a new facility. Design elements from the historic building will be incorporated to create unique interior elements, such as coal hoppers and ash chutes as children's dressing rooms. Restoring the abandoned Power House building to the new home for the Kansas City Ballet cost approximately $39 million, which included a $7 million endowment. Of the costs, $11 million came in the form of state and federal historic tax cuts given to the Kansas City Ballet for restoring this near extinct building.
