= Kansas City Ballet =

Ballet company based in Missouri, US

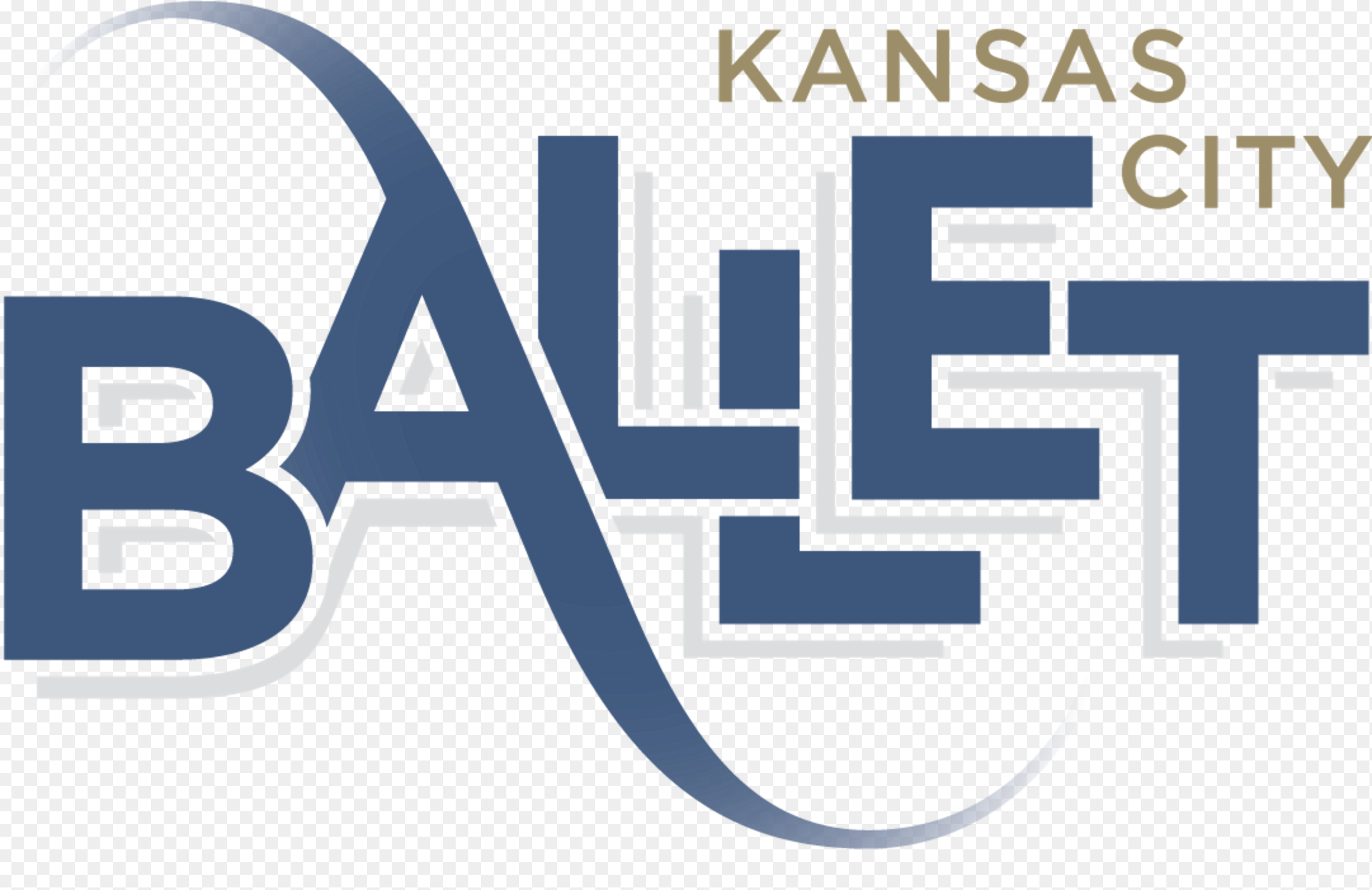

General information
- Name: Kansas City Ballet
- Year founded: 1957
- Founder: Tatiana Dokoudovska
- Principal venue: Kauffman Center for the Performing Arts; Kansas City, Missouri
- Website: kcballet.org

Senior staff
- Executive director: David Gray

Artistic staff
- Artistic director: Devon Carney

Other
- Official school: Kansas City Ballet School
- Formation: Ensemble/unranked

The Kansas City Ballet (KCB) is a professional ballet company based in Kansas City, Missouri. The company was founded in 1957 by Russian expatriate Tatiana Dokoudovska. The KCB presents five major performances each season to include an annual production of The Nutcracker. The KCB, its school, and its staff are all housed in, operate from, and rehearse at the Todd Bolender Center for Dance and Creativity, a renovated, seven-studio, office, and rehearsal facility in Kansas City, Missouri, that opened in August 2011. The company performs at and is the resident ballet company at the nearby Kauffman Center for the Performing Arts, a performance venue in downtown Kansas City that opened in September 2011.

== History ==
=== 1957–1981 – Dokoudovska era ===
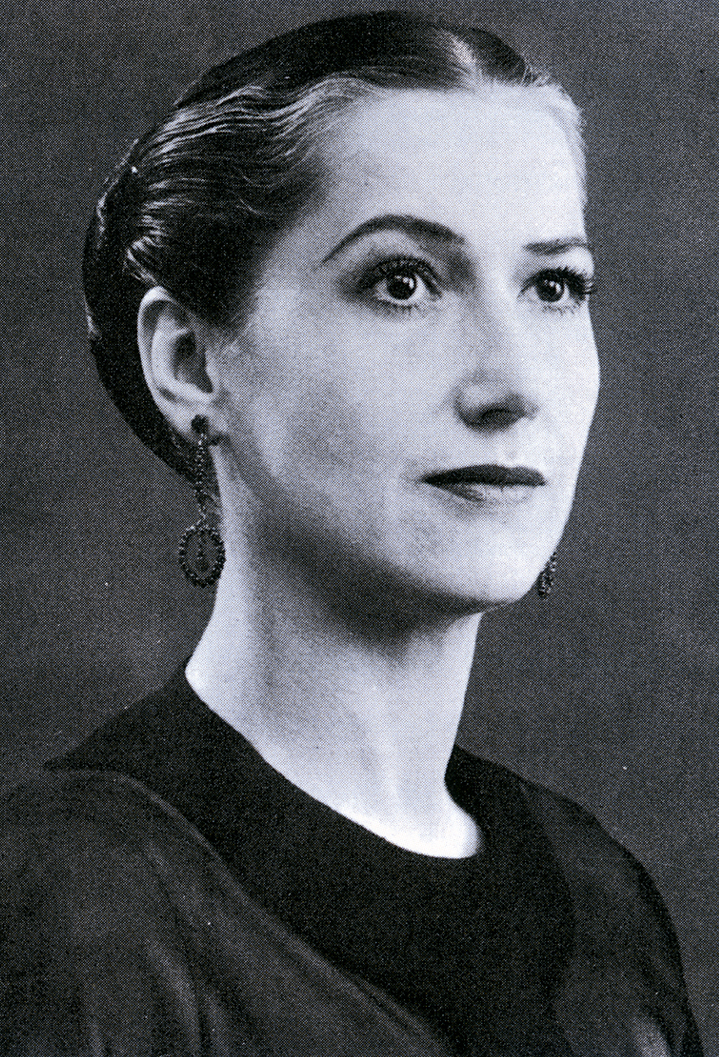
Tatiana Dokoudovska

In 1957, Tatiana Dokoudovska founded the Kansas City Ballet (KCB) at the Carriage House in what is now Overland Park, Kansas. On April 30, 1957, the company gave its premiere performance at the Victoria Theater (renamed the Lyric Theatre) with Dokoudovska serving as its first artistic director. The program included two ballets: Michel Fokine's original Les Sylphides, and Ruse d’Amour, an adaptation by Dokoudovska of Fokine's The Toys. In December 1957, the Kansas City Ballet Company became a 501(c)(3) not-for-profit organization with a board of directors, business manager, and musical director.

In the 1958–1959 season, the company name changed to the Kansas City Civic Ballet.

In 1963, the company moved from the Carriage Club to a location in Kansas City proper on 45th street near the Nelson Atkins Museum.

In 1966, guest artist Nathalie Krassovska came to Kansas City to set Anton Dolin's restaging of Pas de Quatre on the company.

In 1967, Dokoudovska brought Shirley Weaver, a Kansas City native and former dancer with the Metropolitan Opera and the Ballet Russe de Monte Carlo, to the KCB. Weaver danced major roles with KCB, choreographed, served as (honorary) ballet mistress, and taught alongside Dokoudovska at the University of Missouri–Kansas City Conservatory of Music for many years. To commemorate its 10th anniversary, the company performed a program at the Kansas City Music Hall featuring three guest choreographers.

In 1968, the company moved to Treadway Hall on the University of Missouri–Kansas City Campus.

In April 1968, choreographer Zachary Solov began a multi-year collaboration with the KCB, coming to Kansas City to choreograph and stage two world premiere ballets with the KCB: an abstract piece set to Mozart's Symphony No. 40 and a theater ballet based on Carnival of the Animals by Saint-Saëns. The program also included performances by New York City Ballet guest artists Edward Villella and Patricia McBride.

For the opening of the 1969–70 season, Solov returned to Kansas City to create and present three world premiere ballets with the KCB: The World I Knew (set to Massenet's Scenes Alsaciennes), Zygosis, and Divertissement. Lead roles in the first piece were danced by New York City Ballet guest artists Jacques d'Amboise and Melissa Hayden.

In 1970, the mayor of Kansas City, Ilus Winfield Davis, proclaimed a special "Civic Ballet Week" to recognize the company. During the 1970–1971 season, the company name changed back to Kansas City Ballet.

In spring 1971, Solov returned yet again to Kansas City to present a program titled "Ages of Innocence" with the KCB. Solov choreographed/set two additional works for the KCB: Rhapsody and Celebration. The program also included two pieces danced by New York City Ballet guest artists Jacques d'Amboise and Melissa Hayden.

During the 1973–74 season, the KCB moved to a former appliance store building on the corner of 61st and Troost. In December 1973, KCB performed its first full-length The Nutcracker.

In 1975, the Lyric Theatre was designated as the season performance home for the company. That same year, the company added a third fall production to its existing The Nutcracker and spring productions. The company also implemented its first sale of subscription series season tickets.

In 1976, Dokoudovska stepped down as artistic director of the Ballet to devote her time to teaching as head of the ballet department at the Conservatory of Music on the University of Missouri–Kansas City campus. That same year, KCB qualified as a member of the National Endowment for the Arts Dance Touring Program.

From 1976 to 1978, Eric Hyrst served as artistic director.

In 1977, the company office moved to the Prescott Firehouse in Kansas City, Kansas, an upstairs room with a fire pole in the corner. In April 1977 New York City Ballet dancer Patricia McBride performed her first full-length production of Giselle with the KCB.

In 1977–1978, the company went to a four-production season with the addition of a second spring show.

Ronald M. Sequoio served as artistic director from 1978 to 1980. In 1979, the company moved to a warehouse under the Broadway Bridge at 3rd and Broadway in Kansas City, Missouri.

=== 1981–1995 – Bolender era ===
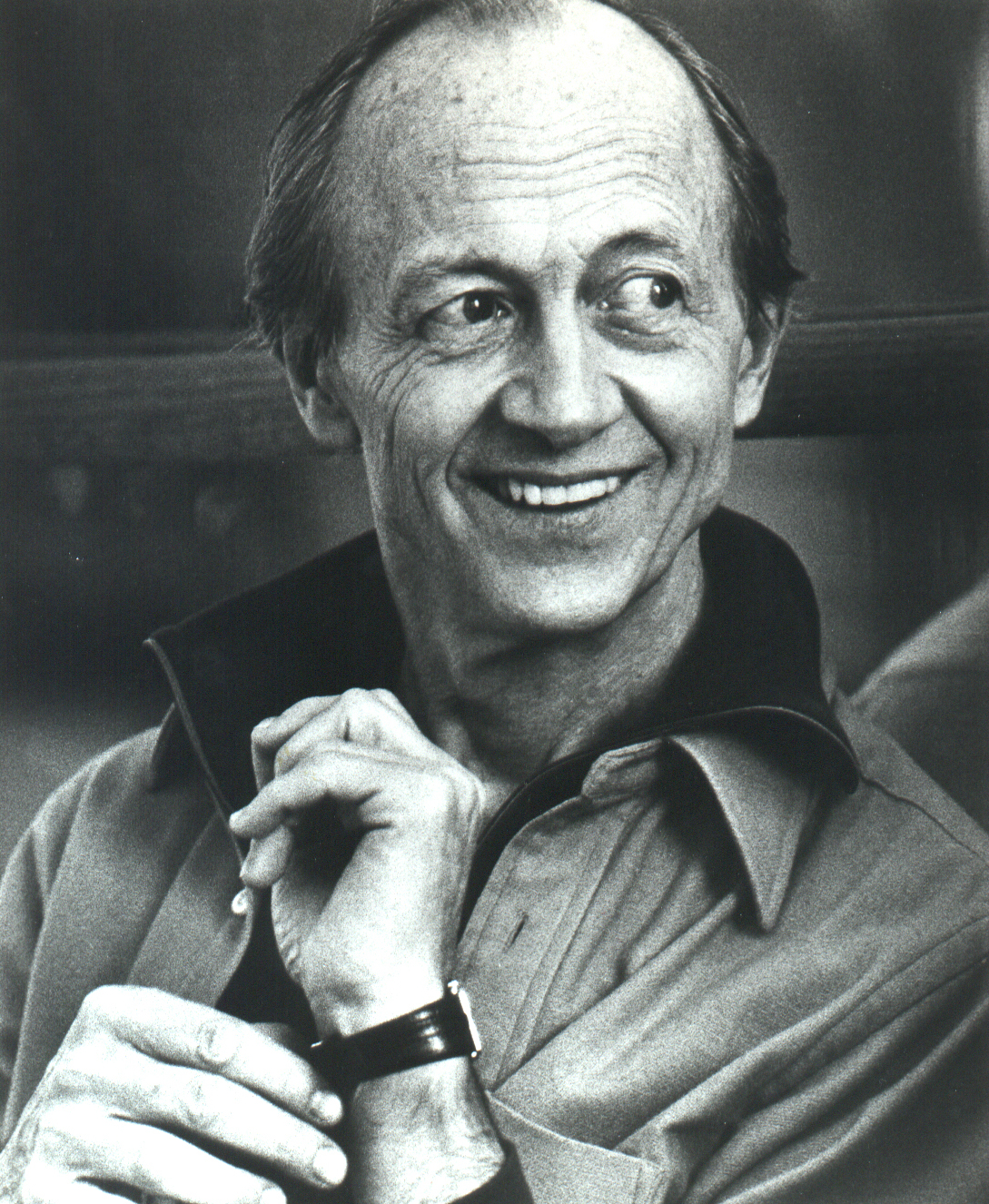
Todd Bolender

In January 1981, Todd Bolender, a renowned and long-time New York City Ballet (NYCB) dancer, teacher, and choreographer, accepted the artistic directorship of the Kansas City Ballet. His first year proved to be pivotal for the company with the introduction of major new works and the implementation of several major initiatives to include the creation/formation of the Kansas City Ballet School.

In May 1982, Bolender saluted his mentor, George Balanchine, by presenting a four-day Balanchine Festival at the Lyric Theatre.

Kevin Amey joined KCB as company manager in February 1983. During the 1983–1984 season, the company increased its performance season with 25 tour dates in five states: Arkansas, Kansas, Missouri, Nebraska, and Wyoming.

In 1985, Michael Kaiser joined the KCB as General Manager.

In 1986, the KCB was renamed the State Ballet of Missouri. The company continued to operate under this name for the next 13+ years. That same year, the company moved to what was then called the Westport Allen Center, a former school building on 42nd Street.

In 1987, KCB debuted in New York City with four Bolender ballets – Souvenirs, The Still Point, Classical Symphony and Concerto in F.

In 1988, Alvin Ailey came to KCB with his ballet The River – the company's first Ailey work. Also in 1988, American Ballet Theatre's Clark Tippett stages his work Enough Said.

In 1989, KCB premiered Bolender's work Celebration, created and performed to mark the 150th anniversary of the founding of the University of Missouri.

In 1991, KCB premiered its first work by Antony Tudor, Lilac Garden.

In 1994, Muriel Kauffman, long-time Kansas City civic leader, philanthropist, and KCB Board Chairman from 1990 to 1992, established a $1 million endowment for the Kansas City Ballet.

In 1994, KCB's Nutcracker sets were redesigned by Robert Fletcher (artist/designer).

Una Kai retired as Ballet Mistress in 1994.

In fall 1995, Bolender choreographed a "Tribute to Muriel" in memory of long-time Kansas City philanthropist and KCB-supporter Muriel Kauffman.

In 1995, Bolender retired at age 81. He was named Artistic Director Emeritus in 1996.

In the fall of 1996, Bolender premiered his last new work for the company, Arena, commissioned by a “Meet the Composer” grant with James Mobberley, composition professor at the UMKC Conservatory and composer-in-residence with the Kansas City Symphony.

=== 1996–2013 – Whitener era ===
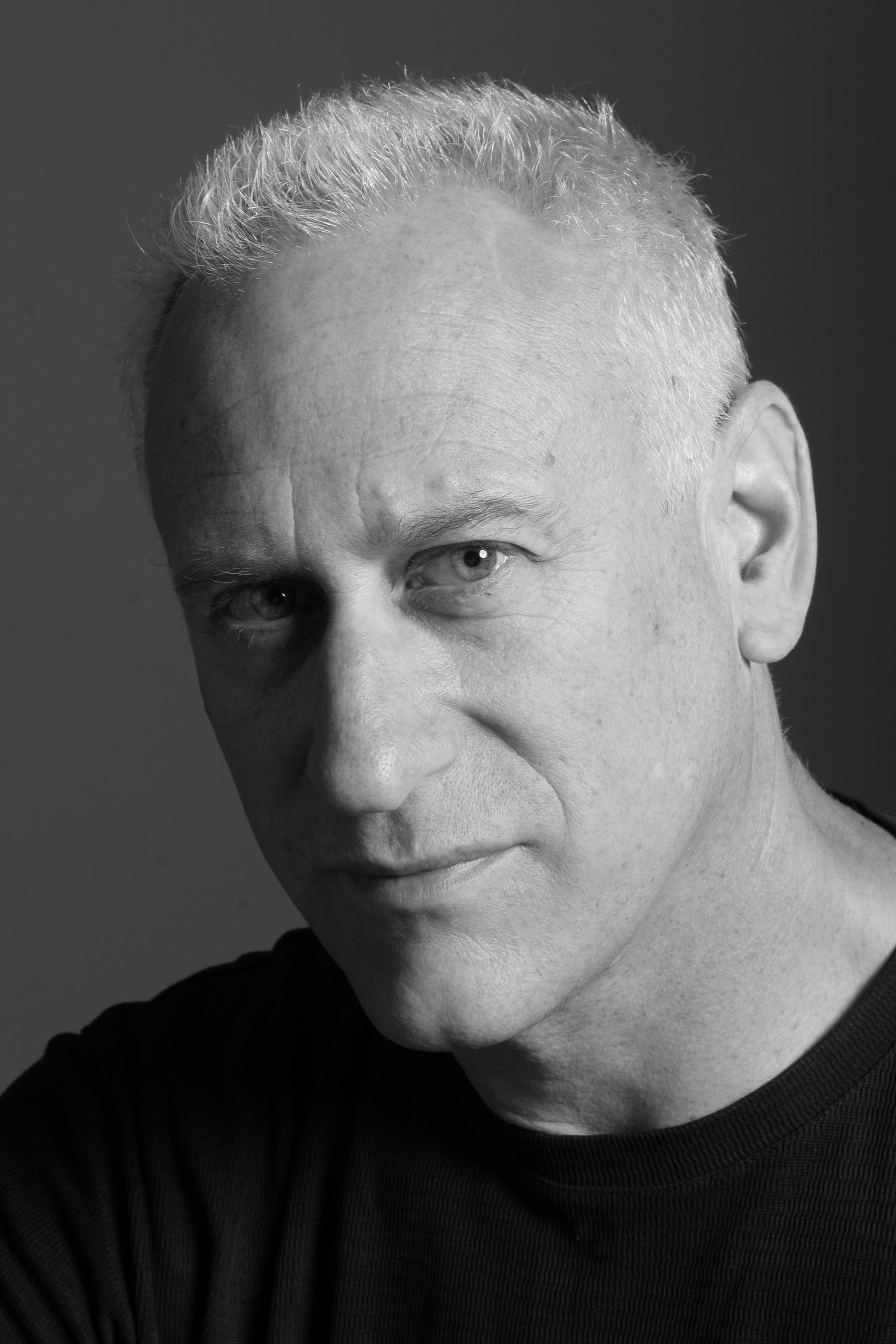
William Whitener

William Whitener, a veteran Joffrey Ballet and Twyla Tharp dancer, prolific choreographer, and experienced artistic director, was selected as KCB Artistic Director in the fall of 1996.

In the spring of 1997, Whitener premiered The Scarlatti Dances, the first of his many creations for the KCB. In the fall of 1997, KCB established a full-time community outreach director position.

In 1998, Jeffrey Bentley was appointed Executive Director of the KCB. In the spring of 1998, Whitener premiered two new works: Songs in the Open Air and A Midsummer Night's Dream featuring the Kansas City Chorale and local Kansas City actor Dale O’Brien at the Midland Theatre.

In 1999, the company moved to the old NCR Building at 1601 Broadway (prophetically perhaps, in 2011 this became the address of the new Kauffman Center for the Performing Arts). KCB presented Giselle, staged by KCB Ballet Mistress/School Director Karen Brown, and two world premiers emphasizing live music: Lila York's Gloria which showcased the Kansas City Symphony Chorus with the Kansas City Ballet Orchestra and Ann Reinking's Suite Kander which included a six-musician band on stage.

In January 2000, after nearly 15 years as the State Ballet of Missouri, the Kansas City Ballet reclaimed its original name. In October 2000, Whitener co-choreographed On the Boulevard with Twyla Tharp Dance colleague Shelley Freydont. The dancers perform alongside the Boulevard Big Band with Grammy-nominated guest vocalist Karrin Allyson. In May 2000, Artistic Director Emeritus Todd Bolender traveled to New York City with four company dancers at the invitation of the George Balanchine Foundation to videotape Bolender's recreation of the "lost" Balanchine ballet Renard.

In 2001, the company participated in Kansas City's Stravinsky Festival. KCB presented two ballets by Balanchine, his masterpiece Agon and Bolender's recreation of Balanchine's Renard.

In the spring of 2002, Whitener garnered national attention and a Dance Magazine cover article with his work Six Solos, a program presenting six solo works created by the legendary choreographers Lotte Goslar, Anna Sokolow, Merce Cunningham, Agnes de Mille, Daniel Nagrin, and Michel Fokine.

In February 2003, in a collaboration with Johnson County Community College, KCB performed Merce Cunningham's Duets, as staged by Catherine Kerr, with Cunningham in attendance.

In 2004, as part of the Balanchine Centennial Celebration and for the first time since 1987, KCB dancers were invited to New York City to perform Bolender's recreation of Balanchine's Renard in the "Wall-to-Wall Balanchine" event at the Sharpe Theatre in Manhattan.

In 2005, KCB performed Twyla Tharp's Nine Sinatra Songs as part of the "Evening Stars" dance series at Battery Park in New York City. Midwest Youth Ballet (now the Kansas City Youth Ballet) began its residency at Kansas City Ballet School in September 2005.

In 2006, KCB announced plans to renovate the old Power House Building at Union Station in downtown Kansas City, Missouri as its new permanent home. Whitener added the story ballet La Fille mal Gardee to the repertory and presented a second series of solo dances by master choreographers, Six Solos of Consequence II.

In January 2007, KCB made a final interim move to a former ladies apparel wholesale warehouse at 1616 Broadway. In May 2007, Whitener added Carmen to the KCB repertory.

In 2008, as part of KCB's 50th Anniversary Celebration season, Whitener added Tharp's Brahms Paganini to the repertory as well as two world premieres, Whitener's First Position and Donald McKayle Hey-Hay, Goin' to Kansas City. That same year, KCB made its debuts at the Joyce Theatre in New York City as well as the John F. Kennedy Center for the Performing Arts in Washington, D.C. The company also performed an extended run of Ib Andersen's Romeo & Juliet at the Music Hall.

In 2009, Whitener continued to add to the KCB repertory with Yuri Possokhov's Firebird, the world premiere of Artic Song by Karole Armitage, and Jessica Lang.

In August 2011, after operating out of nine different locations over the course of 50+ years, the KCB moved into its new permanent home, the totally renovated Todd Bolender Center for Dance and Creativity. In October 2011, KCB made its debut as the resident dance company of the Kauffman Center for the Performing Arts with William Whitener's Tom Sawyer: A Ballet in Three Acts.

=== 2013–present – Carney era ===
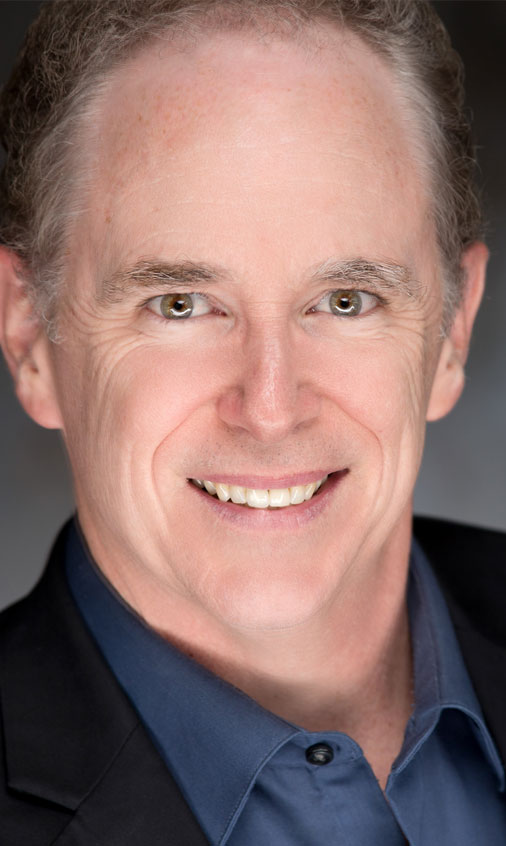
Devon Carney, Artistic Director, Kansas City Ballet

Devon Carney became KCB's artistic director in 2013.

One of Carney's first initiatives at KCB in fall 2013 was the establishment of a Second Company program under the auspices of the KCB School. Carney saw the Second Company, comprising post-graduation trainees and emerging professional dancers, as an important bridge and connector between KCB's school programs and the professional company. Carney concurrently began a concerted effort to expand KCB's repertory, introducing a series of full-length classical ballets as well as more modern works from established choreographers.

2013–2014 season. Carney choreographed and staged his first new work for the KCB, Opus I, which was presented in October 2013. In February 2014, KCB performed Dracula by choreographer Michael Pink. To round out the season, Carney presented the full-length ballet Cinderella, choreographed by Victoria Morgen

In March 2014, Carney launched "New Moves", an initiative designed to search out, develop, and showcase emerging national, local, and company choreographers. Now an annual KCB performance event at the Bolender Center,"New Moves" offers participating choreographers the time, space, and opportunity to work with seasoned professional dancers to create and present world premiere works.

2014–2015. Carney brought choreographer Septime Webre to Kansas City to stage Webre's ballet Alice in Wonderland. In December 2015, KCB retired its venerable Bolender Nutcracker production (performed annually in Kansas City since 1981). In its place, Carney choreographed and staged an entirely new production of The Nutcracker. Carney ended the 2014–2015 season with the premiere of his full-length version of the classic ballet Giselle.

2015–2016. Carney added two more full-length ballets to KCB's repertory: The Three Musketeers and Swan Lake. For the latter piece, Carney invited former American Ballet Theatre prima ballerina Cynthia Gregory to come to Kansas City to coach KCB dancers on the Odette/Odile role. In the spring 2016, Carney presented a program of four modern works: Viktor Plotnikov's new work Vesna, Yuri Possokhov's Diving into the Lilacs, Helen Pickett's Petal, and Adam Houghland's Rite of Spring. For the latter work, former New York City Ballet principal Wendy Whelan came to Kansas City to coach the company.

2016–2017. KCB began the season with Bruce Wells’ ballet A Midsummer Night's Dream. The spring performance was Carney's production of the renowned fairy-tale ballet The Sleeping Beauty. KCB finished off the season with a "Director's Choice" program of three works: Jerome Robbins' Interplay, Val Caniparoli's The Lottery, and George Balanchine's Theme and Variations.

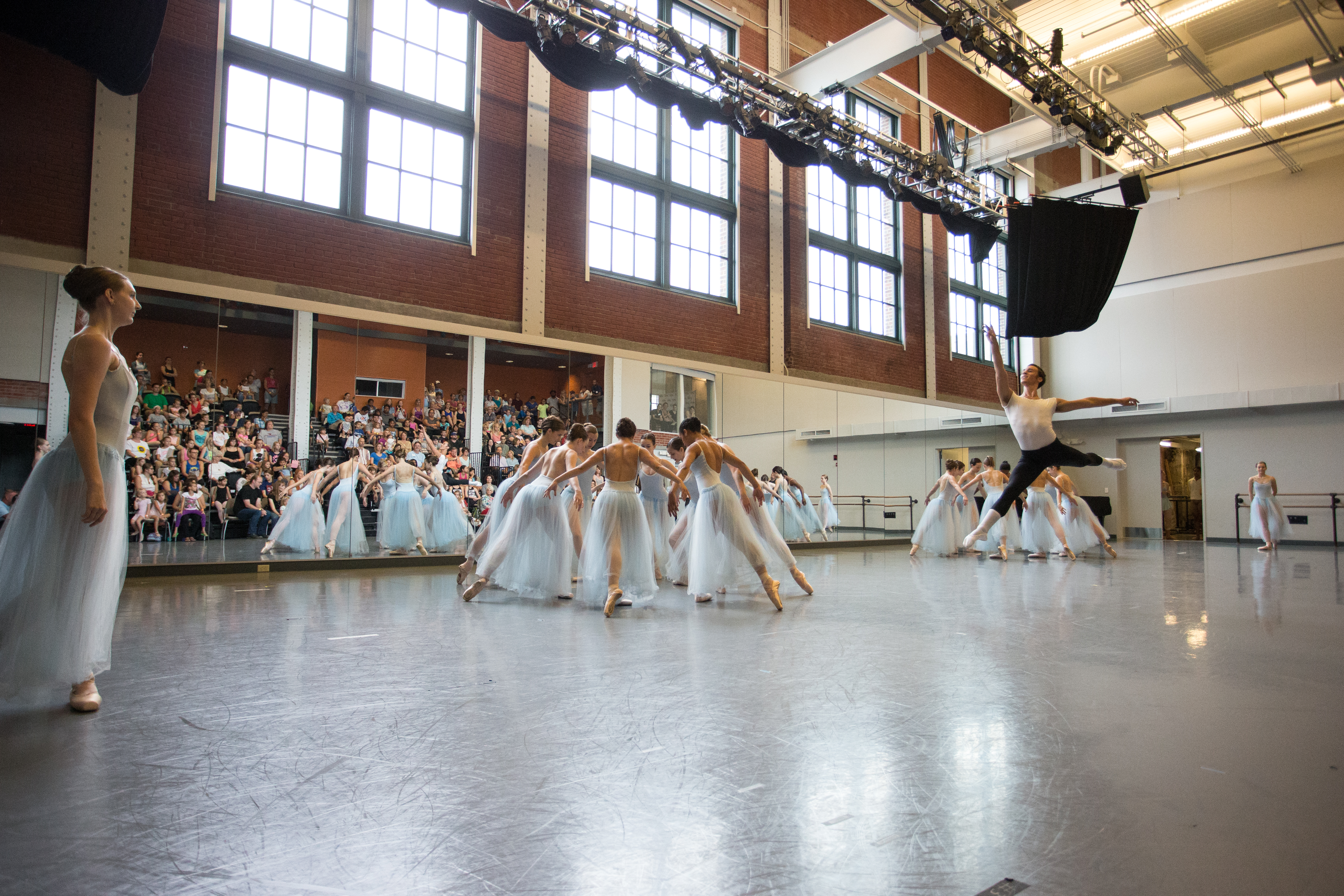
The Kansas City Ballet's downtown studio

2017–2018. KCB celebrated its 60th anniversary in its 2017–2018 season. Carney kicked off the anniversary season with his production of Romeo & Juliet. In November 2017, the John F. Kennedy Center for the Performing Arts invited the KCB to Washington, D.C. to present its new production of The Nutcracker to a national audience. In spring 2018, KCB presented its 60th Anniversary Dance Festival over two consecutive weekends. Week one included Mathew Neenan's The Uneven, Jiří Kylián's Petite Mort, and George Balanchine's master work Diamonds. Week two of the festival brought the world premiere of Andrea Schermoly's Klein Perspectives as well as Stanton Welch's Play, and The Man in Black by James Kudelka. Carney ended KCB's 60th anniversary season with his original production of Peter Pan.

2018–2019. Choreographer Septime Webre returned to Kansas City to create and present the world premiere of his ballet The Wizard of Oz. This work was a joint collaboration between the KCB, Colorado Ballet, and Royal Winnipeg Ballet. In November 2018, Kansas City PBS aired a documentary "Me, Dorothy…and This Road to Oz" that captured the behind-the-scenes story of the creation of this Wizard of Oz ballet. Kansas City PBS won a regional Emmy award for this documentary. The KCB wrapped up their 2018–2019 season with a three-piece program highlighting works by three master American choreographers – William Forsythe's "In the Middle, Somewhat Elevated", the world premiere of (Kansas City-raised) David Parsons' "A Play for Love", and Twyla Tharp's "In the Upper Room."

2019–2020. Carney began the season with a program of three contemporary works: – the world premiere of "Carmina Burana" choreographed on KCB by Adam Hougland, the KCB premiere of Annabelle Lopez Ochoa's "Tulips & Lobster", and Helen Pickett's "Petal". In February 2020, KCB returned to its classical ballet repertory with a reprisal of Devon Carney's "Swan Lake." In March, 2020, KCB announced that they were delaying and/or cancelling scheduled performances for the remainder of their 2019–20 season due to the Coronavirus pandemic.

2020–2021. KCB initially announced the cancellation of its entire 2020–21 season. However, in February 2021, KCB was able to return to the stage virtually with New Moves: The Broadcast Series which consisted of sixteen videos (streamed weekly) of new pieces filmed at well-known venues across the greater Kansas City area. In late May 2021, KCB returned to the stage physically (albeit in masks), presenting live open-air performances at the historic Starlight Theatre.

2021–2022. KCB offered a full season of live performances for their 2021–22 season. In September 2021, KCB performed the world premiere of the work Amor Brujo, choreographed and set on the company by Cuban dancer Irene Rodriguez, as part of the 8th annual New Dance Partners event at the Midwest Trust Center at Johnson County Community College in Overland Park, Kansas. KCB returned to their home stage at the Muriel Kauffman Theatre at the Kauffman Center for the Performing Arts in October 2021 to present a program of three contemporary works: Serenade (George Balanchine), Wunderland (Edwaard Liang) and Celts (Lila York). In February 2022 KCB reprised Michael Pink's work "Dracula" (originally offered by KCB in 2014). In March 2022, KCB hosted their annual New Moves showcase at the Todd Bolender Center for Dance and Creativity, featured for the first time a set of original works all created by female choreographers. KCB closed its 2021–22 season in May 2022 with a reprisal of Septime Webre's popular The Wizard of Oz (originally premiered by KCB in 2018).

2022–2023. KCB opened its 2022–23 season with a reprisal of Devon Carney's Giselle. In late November 2022, the company returned to the John F. Kennedy Center for the Performing Arts to present Devon Carney's The Nutcracker followed in December 2022 by their traditional run of The Nutcracker on their home stage in Kansas City. In February 2023, KCB performed Carney's new production of Cinderella. KCB end-of-season production was aptly titled “Bliss Point” and consisted of three contemporary works; Mark Morris's “Sandpaper”, Jiří Kylián's “Petit Mort”, and “Cacti,” by Alexander Ekman. The latter piece included a strolling onstage performance by local Kansas City-based string quartet Opus 76.

In May 2022, KCB's long-serving Executive Director Jeffrey Bentley announced his retirement, effective the end of the 2022–23 season. In May 2023, KCB announced the selection of David Gray as its new executive director, effective the beginning of the 2023–24 season.

2023–2024. The KCB kicked off its 2023–24 season in October 2024 with the North American premiere of Val Caniparoli's Jekyll & Hyde. After its standard month-long run of Carney's Nutcracker in December 2023, in February 2024 the KCB brought Devon Carney's production of Peter Pan back to the stage (originally performed by KCB in 2018). The KCB presented its annual New Moves program at the Bolender Center in March 2024. The program included seven new works; three choreographed by KCB company dancers, one choreographed by KCB rehearsal director Parrish Maynard, and three works by choreographers Natasha Adorlee, Morgen Sicklick and a collaboration by Caroline Dahm and Haley Costas. The KCB ended its 2023–24 season in grand style with the KCB premiere of George Balanchine's full-length Jewels.

2024–2025.The KCB started its 2024-25 season with a reprisal of Septime Weber’s “Alice (in wonderland)” which was first performed by KCB in 2014. Following its traditional run of “Nutcracker” performances in December 2024, KCB started off 2025 presenting its annual “New Moves” program at the Bolender Center. This program offered six new works; three choreographed by KCB company dancers and three by guest choreographers Duncan Cooper, Peter Chu and Elaine Kimble. The latter piece was performed live by the Kansas City-based Opus 76 Quartet. The program also included a live piano solo performed by company dancer Cameron Thomas.

In February 2025, as the first offering in the new KCB “Family Series”, the KCB presented the story-ballet “Beauty and the Beast” , choreographed by Bruce Wells and featuring KCB Second Company dancers. This hour-long, narrated performance with no intermissions was specifically designed for young audiences and families as an introduction to theater and dance. Bruce Wells himself narrated his ballet from onstage at the historic Folly Theater in downtown Kansas City.

In March 2025, KCB presented its premiere performance of the ballet “Don Quixote”, choreographed by acclaimed dancer, choreographer, and Emmy award winner Anna-Marie Holmes. KCB completed its season in May 2025 with a collection of short dance works collectively titled “Fusion”. It featured a selection of four short, contemporary dance works, including three that the company had performed previously: Annabelle Lopez Ochoa's "Tulips & Lobster", Lila York’s “Celts”, and William Forsythe's “In the Middle, Somewhat Elevated”. The fourth work, titled “hold on tight”, was a world premiere created by Kansas City-based choreographer Caroline Dahm.

2025–2026. The company launched its season in October 2025 with the classic ballet “Swan Lake”, originally choreographed and premiered by Carney in 2016. KCB returned to the stage in late November 2025 for an extended 5-week run of its holiday “The Nutcracker.” In late-January 2026, KCB presented four new works as part of its annual “New Moves” program at the Todd Bolender Center. This was followed in February 2026 with the KCB’s Second Company performance of an hour-long, family-friendly, narrated version of [https://kc.teentix.org/blog/snow-white-a-ballet-for-everyone/ “Snow White”], choreographed by Bruce Wells and presented at the historic Folly Theater in downtown Kansas City.

In March 2026, in celebration of the country’s 250th anniversary, KCB presented an Americana-themed mixed program. This program started with Agnes de Mille’s “Rodeo”, followed by a world premiere by choreographer Caili Quan titled “A Home Away”. Closing the program was George Balanchine’s dazzling “Stars and Stripes.” In May 2026, KCB capped off its Americana-themed season with the KCB premiere of “The Great Gatsby”, choreography by Septime Webre with music by Billy Novick and his Blue Syncopators. Locally-based Kansas City artists performed with the company to include narrator/actor/singer Tanner Rose, jazz singer Ebony Fondren, and tap dancer Lonnie McFadden.

== Senior staff ==
=== Executive Director ===
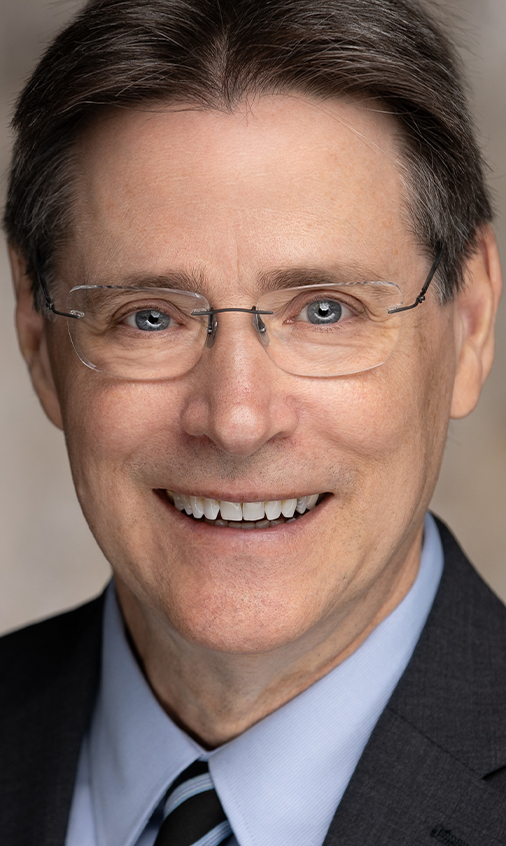
David Gray, Executive director, Kansas City Ballet

David Gray joined KCB as its executive director on 1 July 2023. Prior to coming to Kansas City, Gray served as press director for the New York City Ballet, executive director of the Philadelphia Ballet, the American Repertory Ballet and the Princeton Ballet School, and founded a financial consulting firm focused on non-profit organizations.

== Artistic staff ==
=== Artistic Director ===
Devon Carney became KCB's Artistic Director in 2013. A native of New Orleans, Carney was a long-time principal dancer and ballet master with the Boston Ballet. He also toured extensively throughout the United States, Mexico, Europe, and Asia with ballet notables such as Rudolf Nureyev, Fernando Bujones, and Cynthia Gregory. Prior to coming to KCB, Carney served as the Associate Artistic Director of the Cincinnati Ballet.

=== Rehearsal Directors ===
Kristi Capps joined KCB's artistic staff in 2013. A native of Charlotte, North Carolina, Capps' ballet training included the School of American Ballet, Harid Conservatory and the University of North Carolina School of the Arts. Upon graduation from UNCSA, Ms. Capps joined the Atlanta Ballet for three seasons and then moved to the Cincinnati Ballet in 1996. Promoted to principal in 2002, Capps continued to dance in Cincinnati until her retirement in 2010.

Parrish Maynard joined KCB in 2016. He danced with American Ballet Theatre and as a principal dancer with both the Joffrey Ballet and San Francisco Ballet. From 2005 to 2015, Maynard served on the faculty of San Francisco Ballet School.

Christopher Ruud is the newest member of the KCB artistic staff, having joined KCB in 2019 in the dual roles of KCB's Second Company Manager and Rehearsal Director. Ruud received most of his ballet training at the San Francisco Ballet School. He was hired by Ballet West in 1998, was promoted to principal dancer in 2004, and continued to dance with the company until his retirement in 2019.

=== Music Director ===
Ramona Pansegrau joined KCB in October 2006 as its first Music Director. Previously, Pansegrau served with both the Boston and Tulsa ballet companies, where she held positions as principal pianist, solo pianist, music director, and conductor, respectively. She has also served on the faculty, as music director, and/or as conductor/guest conductor for the Aspen/Snowmass Dance Festival, multiple International Ballet Competitions, the Ballet Across America Festival, the Orlando Ballet, and the Jacob's Pillow Ballet Program.

== Company ==
The Kansas City Ballet is an ensemble or unranked company consisting of 30 dancers. Dancers are routinely interchanged and perform multiple lead, solo, or corp de ballet roles within productions, as required.

Company dancers for the 2026–2027 season are: name (year joined)

- Gavin Abercrombie (2018)
- Isaac Allen (2022)
- Alladson Barreto (2022)
- Joseph Boswell (2024)
- Kaleena Burks (2010)
- Angelin Carrant (2018)
- Anya Chiu (2026)
- Michael Dadlez (2026)
- Aidan Duffy (2023)
- Sidney Haefs (2019)
- Amira Hogan (2023)
- Whitney Huell (2014)
- Olivia Jacobus (2022)
- Joshua Kiesel (2021)
- Keaton Linzau (2024)
- Jordan Long (2026)
- Celeste Lopez-Keranen (2025)
- Audrey Lynn (2026)
- Mei McArtor (2025)
- Amelia Meissner (2023)
- Maura O'Neill (2025)
- Elliott Rogers (2023)
- Noura Sander (2025)
- Naomi Tanioka (2019)
- Cameron Thomas (2017)
- Marisa DeEtte Whiteman (2018)
- Derek Wippel (2025)
- Ben Workman (2026)
- Gillian Yoder (2024)
- Paul Zusi (2021)

== Repertory ==
The KCB has performed over 200 works since its founding in 1957. The company maintains a complete list of works they have performed on their website.

The growth of the company to 30 full-time dancers and the addition of the Second Company has allowed it to expand into more and larger full-length classical works.

== School ==
The KCB School was formed in 1981 by KCB Artistic Director Todd Bolender. It provided pre-professional training under his personal direction and that of KCB Ballet Mistress Una Kai. Over 40 years later, the school has grown and expanded dramatically, now offering a comprehensive and diverse training program for students of all ages. It received "Outstanding School" awards at the 2017, 2018, 2019, and 2020 Youth America Grand Prix Regional Semi-finals.

It operates from two locations; the Bolender Center in downtown Kansas City, Missouri and its South Campus at Meadowbrook facility in nearby Johnson County, Kansas. In June 2022, the KCB announced plans for a $1.8M expansion of its South Campus facility. The expansion, which nearly triples the facility's square footage, adds two studios (from two to four), and provides staff space and expanded/full changing rooms, was completed in August 2023.

=== School Director ===
Oliver Till joined KCB as director of the Kansas City Ballet School in July 2024. He trained at the Royal Ballet School and was a former soloist with Birmingham Royal Ballet, where he performed a wide range of roles and repertoires and toured extensively across the UK, Europe, USA, Japan and China. After his dance career, Oliver transitioned to Ballet training, starting with the Swedish National Ballet School and then joining the Joffrey Ballet as Head of Children's, Adult, and Adaptive Programs.

=== School programs ===
The KCB School has two divisions: The academy, which begins at age 3, and the Studio Division, for ages 12 and older.

- The academy. Currently, the academy has more than 500 students, making it one of the largest ballet schools in the region. The academy is divided into two sections: a "lower" school and an "upper" school.

- Lower School. The Lower school offers two programs. The Children's Program, for ages 3-7, introduces children to ballet and movement while focusing on creativity and group interaction. The Primary Program, for ages 7-11, lays the foundation of more advanced classical ballet training.

- Upper School. The Upper school offers Intermediate and Advanced programs. Both programs focus on developing a student's technique, musicality, and artistry. The varied curriculum and progression of levels allows for the development of a strong, versatile dancer. The Daytime Program was introduced in 2016 as an extension of the Upper School. It offers students an opportunity to study intensively during the day. Students attend 20-25 hours of training each week including classes in all dance forms.

- Studio Division. Classes/Programs offered include:

- Junior Studio classes are for students, ages 7–15 who are unable to commit to the number of classes per week that are required to participate in the Academy Division. These classes also provides Academy students the opportunity to augment their dance education with classes in other dance curriculum, such as Jazz and Hip Hop.

- Studio Dance and Fitness classes are for all ages and experience levels.

- Adult dance classes and workshops are available and organized into 4 or 6 week sessions.

=== Kansas City Youth Ballet ===
Originally called the Midwest Youth Ballet, it began its residency with the KCB School in 2005. KCYB is made up of dancers ranging in age from 13 to 18. The company presents two major performances each season and educational outreach demonstrations throughout the community, showcasing works by local and national choreographers, as well as new emerging artists.

=== Second Company program ===
KCB's Second Company is an emerging professionals program. It provides talented young dancers professional experience as a prelude to their moving into a professional company.

- Trainee Program. The tuition-based Trainee Program was created in 2014 to develop the technical skills and artistry of young aspiring post-secondary school dancers, preparing them for a dance career by bridging the gap between the student and the professional level. Trainees participate in some company classes and have the opportunity to be considered for performances with KCB Company during the season. They also perform in tandem with the KCB II in their own educational and community outreach performances throughout the year.
- KCB II. The KCB II concept was created and implemented as a strategic initiate by KCB Artistic Director Devon Carney in the fall of 2013. It currently consists of seven aspiring dancers selected from across the US. KCB II dancers hone their dance skills and gain experience in a professional environment and are often afforded the opportunity to perform alongside KCB's professional company. They also serve as ambassadors for dance and KCB across the region, reaching out to local audiences and communities via "mini-performances" at private and public venues. Previous events have included performances at local Kansas City art galleries, Kansas City's historic Union Station, and at the annual Kansas City Plaza Lights Ceremony.

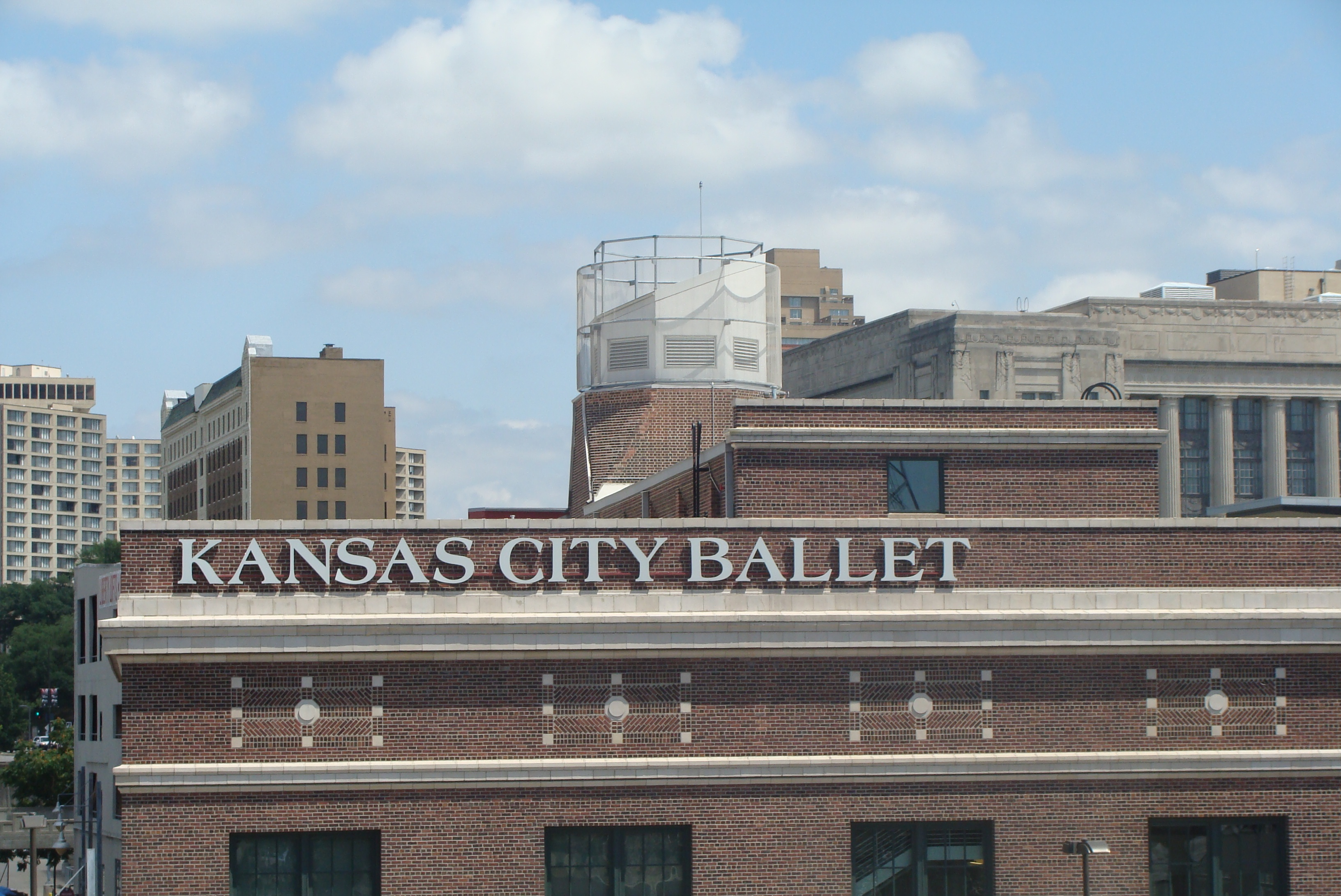
The Kansas City Ballet's studio is located blocks away from Union Station in downtown Kansas City

=== Reach Out and Dance (ROAD) ===
- Residency Program. The "Reach Out And Dance" (ROAD) program was created in 2000 and currently introduces 1000+ Kansas City area elementary school students each year to movement, music, and ballet. ROAD is a 12- to 24-week in-school dance residency program focused on encouraging and engaging students to have a deeper understanding and connection to dance. ROAD is taught by professional teaching artists from KCB to live music. Participation in ROAD requires no special dance clothing, shoes, or equipment for the students. The curriculum is specifically designed for 3rd and 4th grade students, introducing students to the fundamentals of dance: space, time, effort, self-discipline and cooperative learning. Weekly lessons are integrated with a school's academic curriculum and are based on national, Missouri, and Kansas State education standards. The ROAD program culminates each year in a special "ROAD Rally" for the families of ROAD students.
- ROAD Scholarship Program. KCB's ROAD Scholarship Program was initiated in September 2017 in partnership with Kansas City Public Schools (KCPS) in Missouri and with the Turner Unified School District 202 in Kansas. This program provides 100+ select children from sixteen schools participating in the ROAD School Residency Program the opportunity to study dance once a week during the school day at the Bolender Center. The school districts provide the students transportation to and from the Bolender Center.
- Program Recognition. In 2019, recognizing the impact and importance of the ROAD program to children in the greater Kansas City community, the Hearst Foundations awarded the ROAD program a $100,000 grant.

== Community Engagement and Education ==
KCB offers an array of community engagement and education programs designed to create awareness and appreciation of ballet and to engage learners of all ages in a deeper understanding and connection to dance and the ballet art form.

=== Educational performances ===
- Matinees for Schools. KCB performs specially discounted morning matinees for schools designed to enhance interdisciplinary learning, including English language arts, social studies/history, music, and technology. Teachers receive an online multi-media study guide which includes a ballet synopsis, educational activities and resources related to performances.
- Lecture Demonstrations. KCB Second Company offers a 60-minute interactive dance program in schools, appropriate for elementary, middle, and high-school students. These programs are narrated by dancers and KCB staff and include a diverse repertoire of classic and contemporary ballets, including excerpts for KCB's current season.

=== Community programs ===
- Dance-a-Story. For pre-K and early elementary school students, KCB provides 45-minute "Dance-a-Story" workshops that bring stories to life through creative movement, music, and a costume and props show-and-tell.
- Master Classes. Intermediate and advanced dance students may take a class from one of KCB's master teachers or from a master guest teacher.
- Dance Speaks. Dance Speaks is an educational series offered by KCB at various community venues. The series provide up-close and personal discussions with guest artists on KCB's current repertoire and the creative processes of in-house and emerging choreographers, as well as trends in the field.
- Behind-the-Scenes Tours. Community groups are invited to tour the Todd Bolender Center for Dance and Creativity, KCB's home, and to view company class and rehearsals. Groups also receive informative materials about the company's up-coming ballets in progress.
- KC Dance Day. Since 2010, KCB has opened the Bolender Center to the public for the annual "KC Dance Day" event. Thousands of people from the Kansas City region come to this event each year for free dance classes as well as performances by local Kansas City dance groups. William Whitener stated that KC Dance Day “was KC Ballet's gift to the local dance community... It was a way to support, acknowledge and generate enthusiasm for all kinds of dance in the local area."

== Support groups ==
=== KCB Guild ===
The KCB Guild can be traced to a group created by KCB mothers to support the KCB back in 1961. In 1967, this group was known as the KCB "Women's Committee", it was subsequently renamed the "Kansas City Ballet Guild." The KCB Guild is currently a group of over 200 Kansas City-area ballet supporters who serve as advocates for dance and ballet in the Kansas City community.

- Fundraising. The Guild conducts two major fundraising efforts each year for the KCB – the Nutcracker Boutique and the annual Ballet Ball. The KCB "Women's Committee" sponsored the first "Ballet Ball" in 1968, with Elizabeth Hard and Jan Newman as co-chairs. In 2017, the KCB Guild sponsored the KCB 60th Anniversary "Diamond Ball", raising over $300K for the KCB.
- Archive. The KCB Guild Archive Committee maintains the Tatiana Dokoudovska Library for Dance which was established in 2008. It currently houses four collections: the KCB core collection and three special collections containing materials from each of the three previous artistic directors; Tatiana Dokoudovska, Todd Bolender, and William Whitener. The core collection spans 1957–2012 with the bulk of the records dating after 1980. In May 2023, the Guild announced the creation of a named endowment fund to support the continued development of the KCB Archive.

=== Bolender Society ===
The KCB Bolender Society is a group of ballet supporters who make substantial annual donations and/or legacy endowments to the KCB. Members are invited to special KCB events such lunches/lectures with guest choreographers, social gatherings with company dancers, private rehearsals, and trips to dance performances.
