= Todd Bolender =

American choreographer (1914–2006)

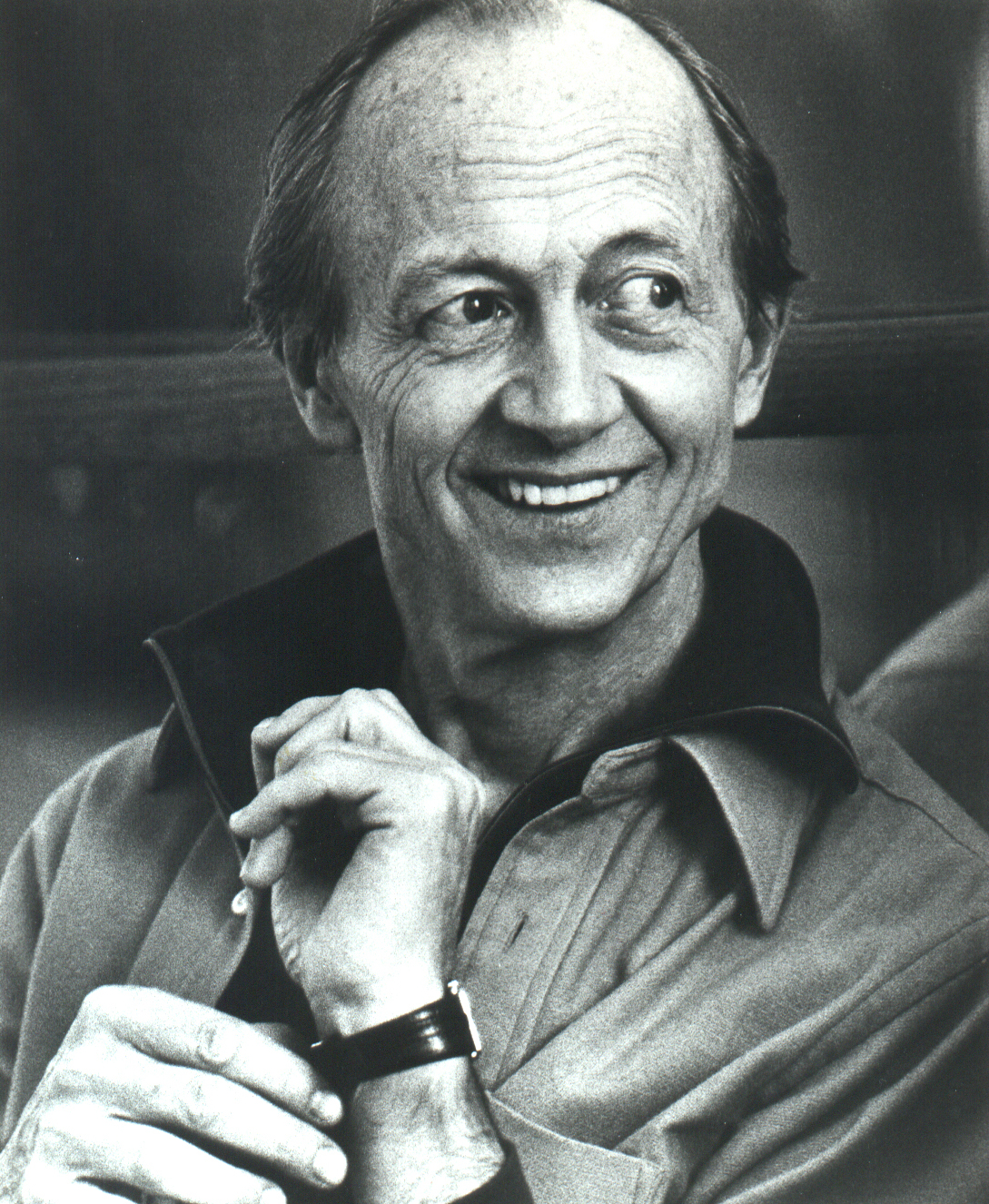
Todd Bolender

Todd Bolender (February 27, 1914 – October 12, 2006) was a renowned ballet dancer, teacher, choreographer, and director. He was an instrumental figure in the creation and dissemination of classical dance and ballet as an American art form. A child of the American Midwest during the Great Depression, he studied under George Balanchine and led the Kansas City Ballet in Kansas City, Missouri, from 1980 to 1995.

== Early life ==
Born in Canton, Ohio, on February 27, 1914, Bolender grew up in a family in which the arts, music and theater in particular, were an important part of life. The extremely lively child—one of four—was early on dubbed the dancer of the family and his physical energy channeled in lessons in acrobatic tap. In 1931, when he was 17, Bolender went to New York, which he said in an interview in 2002 seemed to him like a "kind of heaven", to study theatrical dance. In 1933 he moved to New York for good, taking up full-time residence there at about the same time George Balanchine arrived in this country.

== Early years of dance ==
Attendance at a concert by Mary Wigman led Bolender to Hanya Holm, who he said later saved him from bad teaching. Social acquaintance with Balanchine, however, made a strong impression. Under Balanchine's supervision, Bolender studied at the fledgling School of American Ballet with such Russian teachers as Pierre Vladimiroff, Felia Dubrovska, Anatole Oboukhoff and Ludmilla Schollar. He also trained with Muriel Stuart and, pursuing a strong interest in modern dance, studied with Louis Horst and Harald Kreutzberg. The two greatest influences on his choreography, Bolender was to say later, were Wigman and Uday Shankar, both of whom he saw perform in New York in the early thirties, along with Kreutzberg. Asked why he became a ballet dancer, Bolender said simply it was the Depression and he needed a job.

As a dancer, Bolender had an unusually long career, lasting from 1936 to 1972 when he performed onstage for the last time in New York City Ballet's Stravinsky Festival, for which he also choreographed two pieces, Serenade in A and Piano-Rag-Music. Not only was he a member of every permutation of the company that became New York City Ballet, he also danced with Littlefield Ballet in the late thirties, performing in Catherine Littlefield's Barn Dance and the first American Sleeping Beauty. He performed with Les Ballets Russe de Monte Carlo for one season (1945–46) and with Ballet Theatre for four months in 1944 before being sidelined with an injury.

Bolender was a versatile dancer, originating roles in the work of Balanchine — most notably The Four Temperaments, Renard, and Agon — and in much of the choreography of Jerome Robbins as well. In Lew Christensen's work, he originated the State Trooper in Filling Station and Alias in Billy the Kid. Critic and historian Doris Hering, writing in the International Dictionary of the Ballet calls him "a superb comedian with a penchant for high camp." Describing him in Jerome Robbins' The Concert, she writes: "[he] was a henpecked husband who constantly escaped into daydreams of sexual conquest. Clad in a vest and long underwear and chewing on a huge cigar, he was the prototype of ... J. Walter Mitty." Longtime New York City Ballet observer Robert Garis said of him in Agon, "[his] easy wit and charm in the first pas de trois seem unrecapturable" (ibid.)

Mother Goose Suite, made in 1943, was the first of some three dozen ballets Bolender made in the course of his long career, eleven of them for New York City Ballet. Bolender's choreography is in the repertoires of Kansas City Ballet, New York City Ballet, American Ballet Theatre, the Ballet Russe de Monte Carlo, San Francisco Ballet, Pacific Northwest Ballet, The Joffrey Ballet, and the Alvin Ailey American Dance Theater. His best known works, both of which are still in active repertoire, are Souvenirs and The Still Point, both made in 1955.

== Later career ==
He worked with Igor Stravinsky, Aaron Copland, Virgil Thomson and Samuel Barber.

While the bulk of his choreography was for ballet companies, Bolender also choreographed for musical theater, opera and television, starting in 1952 with Time Remembered for Albi Marre Productions. In 1969, he choreographed The Conquering Hero, followed by Cry for Us All in 1970. In Turkey, where he worked in the seventies, Bolender choreographed My Fair Lady, Fiddler on the Roof, Man of La Mancha, and Showboat. In Kansas City, he choreographed for many operas, including Samson and Delilah for which the dancing got a better review than the singing.

Bolender taught throughout his career in New York and as a guest teacher all over the United States as well as in Turkey, Japan, Austria, and Germany. From 1963 to 1966, he was ballet director for the Cologne Opera House and from 1966 to 1969 he filled the same role in Frankfurt. With Janet Reed he was a founding director of Pacific Northwest Ballet in 1975 and for three years starting in 1977 he was ballet director in the Atatürk Opera House.

== Career in Kansas City ==
Todd Bolender's appointment as artistic director in the winter of 1981 opened a new chapter of opportunity for the Kansas City Ballet. Confident that a broader community support for classical ballet might be found, Bolender had a vision to build a company, a repertoire, and a school in the nation's heartland. Bolender did all three and at an age when most people have retired

Bolender became Artistic Director Emeritus in 1996 when he retired from Kansas City Ballet and William Whitener took over as artistic director. In the fall of 1997, Bolender was invited to New York by the George Balanchine Foundation to officially document for videotape the choreography of the solo that Balanchine created for him in The Four Temperaments. Bolender, who created the role of the Fox in the original 1947 production of Renard, resurrected this piece, which had initially vanished for a half century, in 2001 for Kansas City Ballet.

He was active in the preservation of Balanchine's work, coaching dancers in his roles in the repertoire for the Balanchine Foundation's Film Archive, including reconstructing Renard with Kansas City Ballet dancers. In 2006, Bolender was awarded the Dance Magazine Award for his lifetime achievement in dance.

Just weeks before he was to receive the award, Bolender died on October 12, 2006, at age 92 from complications related to a stroke.

The Todd Bolender Center for Dance and Creativity opened on August 26, 2011. The building is the new home for the Kansas City Ballet and the Ballet School.

After 34 successful years, Kansas City Ballet performed its final Nutcracker featuring choreography by Todd Bolender during the 2014 winter season.
