= Lonnie McFadden =

American singer-songwriter (born 1956)

- Born: James Lonnie McFadden III; January 1, 1956 (age 70); Kansas City, Missouri, U.S.
- Genres: Jazz; R&B
- Occupations: Musician; singer; tap dancer; songwriter; bandleader
- Instruments: Trumpet, flugel horn, voice, taps
- Years active: 1961–present
- Labels: Didah's Music, Green Lady Radio, Jazz Daddy Records
- Website: lonniemcfadden.com

Lonnie McFadden (born January 1, 1956) is an American jazz trumpet player, tap dancer, singer, songwriter, arranger, and recording artist. McFadden is known for his exuberant multi-genre performance style. He and his brother, Ronald McFadden, have performed a stage show for decades as The McFadden Brothers. More recently, the Kansas City-based artist leads his own jazz ensembles.

== Early life ==
Lonnie McFadden was born on January 1, 1956, in Kansas City, Missouri. McFadden and his siblings were raised by their parents in the Jazz District of Kansas City, Missouri. His father, renowned tap dancer and musician Jimmy McFadden, had a strong influence on Lonnie's musical development. Jimmy, known as “Pops,” toured nationally with top, national jazz orchestras in his youth. He held deep roots in the Kansas City jazz scene and brought influential local talents into the McFadden's home and social circles. Jimmy had Lonnie and his brother Ronald in tap shoes before they reached kindergarten, and he required the boys to study piano. He ushered them to the stage at Kansas City's Muehlbach Hotel when Lonnie was seven and Ronald, six. The brothers performed in The Mutual Musicians Foundation, the world's oldest jazz jam room, when they were still in grade school. Entering middle school, Lonnie quit tap dancing and took up trumpet.

== Career ==
Before graduating from Kansas City's Lincoln High School, McFadden joined the band Clyde N’em and Her, a R&B ensemble led by alto saxophonist Clyde Bagby. McFadden joined as a trumpeter and stayed with the band for a year and half. Bagby required him to sing, and it was here that McFadden first developed his vocal stage presence, now a key part of his performance palette.

In 1974, at age 17, he formed his own group, Lonnie and the Band, playing in Kansas City's inner-city clubs under his father's management. McFadden was lead singer, songwriter, trumpeter and musical arranger. Ronald McFadden played alto saxophone, flute, and vocals, and choreographed performances. Other personnel were Thomas Dean, trumpet, trombone, Flugel horn and vocals; John “Duck” Brown, drums; Tyrone Clarke, bass; Tim Williams, trombone; Willie Matthews, lead and rhythm guitar.

Lonnie and the Band performed from 1974 to 1984. From 1976 to 1980, they played in Osaka, Japan four months of each year. While in Japan, McFadden and his brother revived the tap combinations of their childhood, and since then tap has stayed in McFadden's act.

In 1983, Lonnie and Ronald formed The McFadden Brothers, presenting a tap-infused floor show. In July of that year, they premiered as a specialty act for singer Oleta Adams in a performance at The Kansas City Music Hall. From May through October 1984, the brothers performed six daily performances, six days a week at Worlds of Fun amusement park. In 1985, playwright John Auble produced Steps: the Pops McFadden Story, about McFadden's father. The McFadden Brothers starred in the play on the Goldenrod (showboat) in St. Louis, MO for nearly a year. Also in 1985, they performed on a Variety Club telethon with Sammy Davis Jr., who had worked previously with Jimmy McFadden. In the mid-1980s, they appeared on the national television programs, Inside Edition, The Jenny Jones Show and Incredible Sundays.

In 1986, The McFadden Brothers danced in front of the Count Basie Orchestra at the historic 18th and Vine crossroads in Kansas City, to commemorate their father's work with that orchestra. The next year, they signed with Count Basie Enterprises, and toured internationally from 1987 to 1990, performing with the Count Basie Orchestra.

From 1995 to 1998, The McFadden Brothers joined Las Vegas entertainment giant, Wayne Newton's stage act, performing at the MGM Grand Las Vegas and Las Vegas Hilton. They travelled with Newton in 2004 to entertain US troops in Kuwait and Iraq.

In 2008, Reel Images Film and Video Group released Rodney Thompson's Sons of a Hoofer, a documentary movie about The McFadden Brothers that premiered at Kansas City's historic Gem Theater with a live performance by Lonnie and Ronald.

In 2012, McFadden recorded the CD I Believe in Music. The openly biographical CD reflects his life in music. Its personnel includes his brother and three daughters.

For many years, McFadden enjoyed a steady booking of solo and duo settings at Kansas City's Plaza III Restaurant, until the venue's 2018 closing. That year, Kansas City club owner and producer John Scott invited him to the Black Dolphin stage of the Green Lady Lounge jazz complex, a group of Scott's jazz stages located near the well-known Green Lady Lounge. McFadden accepted a monthly booking and began working with a full quartet. This booking as a quartet leader increased to two nights per week and opened room for a full, signature show.

In 2018, he recorded the CD Lonnie McFadden Live at Green Lady Lounge. The recording features McFadden in an assortment of roles: he wrote six of its nine tunes in a variety of musical genres, and he emcees, sings, plays trumpet and taps, backed by Tyree Johnson on drums, Deandre Manning on acoustic and electric bass, and Andrew Ouellette on piano.

== Musical style and influences ==
McFadden's work embraces diverse 20th-century entertainment traditions and advances into contemporary jazz. His father instilled in him and his brother Ronald the jazz styles of the 1930s and 40s, and performance styles of Vaudeville stage entertainment. He taught the McFadden brothers to create multi-genre shows suited to their audiences, and McFadden has benefited from that vision, reinventing his collaborative stage act throughout his career.

Funk, rock, and R&B influenced him early on, and McFadden's performances include popular songs of the 1960s, 70s and 80s.

McFadden's entertainment style combines energetic trumpet solos with riffs reminiscent of Louis Armstrong, soulful singing, and traditional jazz tap. As a leader, he showcases diverse musicians, invites collaboration across genres, and reflects his penchant for Kansas City's swinging jazz style. In a 2018 interview, he told jazz artist Ken Lovern, “[When I perform] it is just natural for me to be humble and ingratiating to the audience. This is not pandering: I care that the audience has a good time… I count on the musicians I hire to bring musical integrity: I would never hire a musician who doesn't play better than me." Raised in the heart of Kansas City's 18th and Vine jazz district, he says of that heritage: "…there’s nobody who could swing like those guys did! No matter what I’m playing…there's something of that sound in it. It’s what I do."

== Awards ==
In 2016, Lonnie and Ronald McFadden received a Lifetime Achievement Award from the American Jazz Museum. In 2017, Tapology awarded the brothers The Living Legends Award and Kansas City's Ingram's Magazine awarded McFadden Best Entertainer.

== Discography ==
Year recorded	Title	Label	Producer(s)
2007	Chapter 1	The McFadden Brothers	Lonnie McFadden
2012	I Believe in Music	Didah's Music	Lonnie McFadden
2018	Lonnie McFadden Live at Green Lady Lounge	Green Lady Radio & Jazz Daddy Records	John Scott (Executive) & Lonnie McFadden, Ken Lovern, Robert Rebeck
