= Lyric Theatre (Kansas City, Missouri) =

Historic theatre in Kansas City, Missouri

- Ararat Shrine Temple, Playhouse Theatre, Victoria Theatre, Capri Theatre
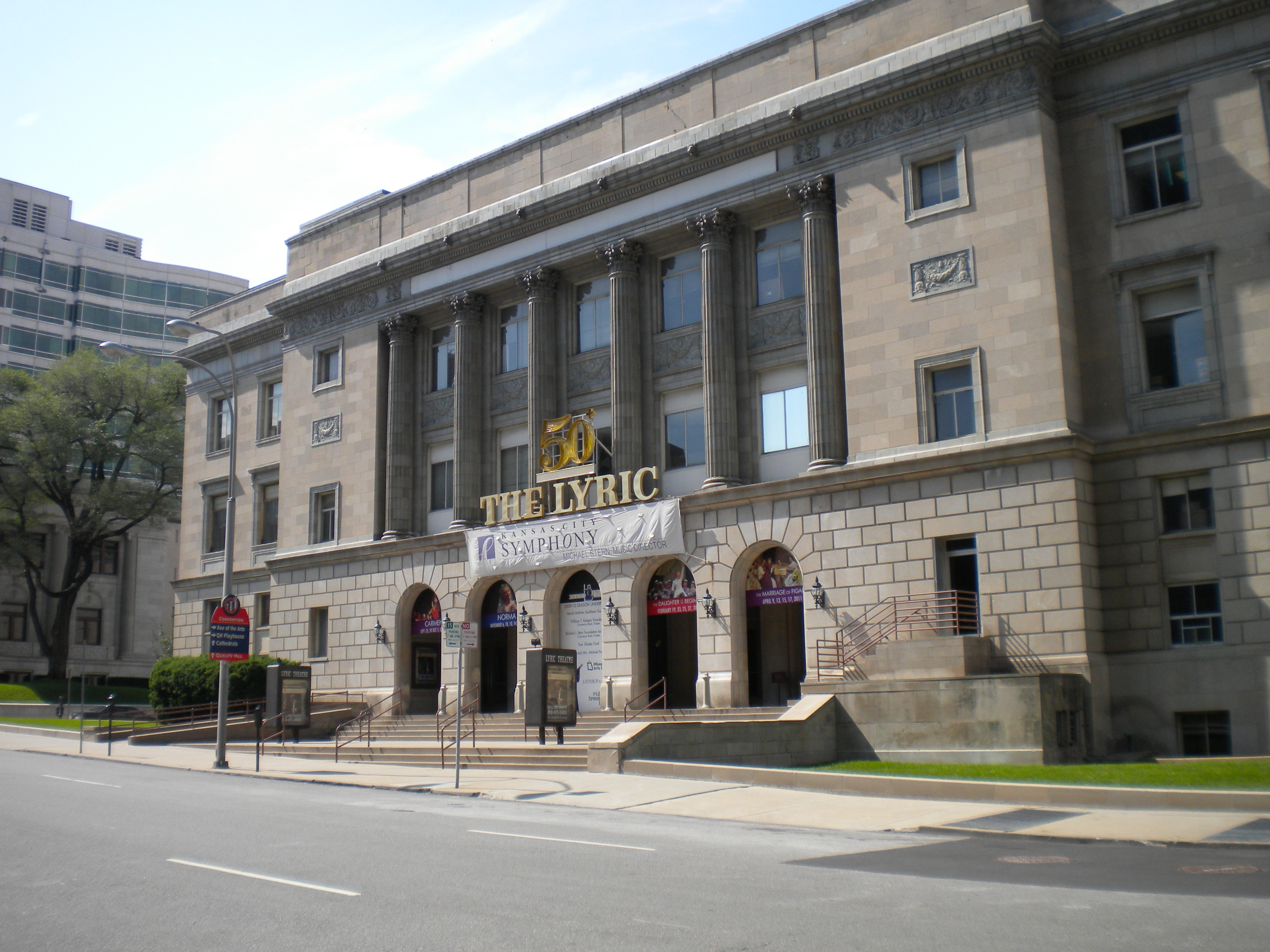
- Interactive map of Lyric Theatre
- Address: 1029 Central Avenue; Kansas City, Missouri; United States
- Coordinates: 39°06′05″N 94°35′12″W
- Owner: DST Realty
- Capacity: 3,000
- Type: Shriners Temple

Construction
- Opened: December 18, 1926
- Closed: 2011
- Architects: Owen, Sayler & Payson

The Lyric Theatre was a theatre in Kansas City, Missouri, United States.

The 4 1/2-story structure designed by Owen Saylor and Payson opened on December 18, 1926, as the Ararat Shrine Temple. It cost the Shriners $1 million and had a seating capacity of 3,000. It was designed to imitate the Temple of Vesta and was to be part of a complex that also consisted of the Deramus Building and the American Hereford Building on other corners of the intersection at 10th and Central.

In 1939 Union Trust of St. Louis foreclosed on the $600,000 note on the building. During World War II it was sold to the American Red Cross as a blood collection center.

It was used as a legitimate theatre called the Playhouse and later the Victoria.

Midland Broadcasting bought the building in 1947 for its KMBC radio broadcasts (and later KMBC-TV)

In 1957 Durwood Organization took it over and converted for Todd-AO and later Cinerama movies and named it the Capri Theatre.

KMBC continued to broadcast from beneath the stage.

In 1970 the Lyric Opera of Kansas City signed a lease to perform at the theatre.

In 1974 Metromedia, then owners of KMBC-TV, took over management of the building although the live arts continued to be performed.

In 1982 The Hearst Corporation, KMBC-TV's new owners, acquired the building. In 1989 a piece of plaster fell from the building during a rehearsal of the Kansas City Symphony. Hearst initially began repairs and eventually sold it to the Lyric Opera which continued the repairs.

In 2007 the Lyric Opera sold the theatre to DST Realty. KMBC-TV left its long-time home to go to new quarters near Swope Park.

In 2011 the Lyric Opera of Kansas City, the Kansas City Symphony and the Kansas City Ballet moved their performances to the newly constructed Kauffman Performing Arts Center.

On November 19, 2018, the YMCA of Greater Kansas City broke ground on the renovation that would become what is now the Kirk Family YMCA.
