= Lyric Opera of Kansas City =

Opera company in Kansas City, Missouri, United States

Lyric Opera of Kansas City is an American opera company located in Kansas City, Missouri.

Founded in 1958 by conductor Russell Patterson, the company presents an annual season of four operas at the Kauffman Center for the Performing Arts. Productions in the first season were of Puccini's La bohème, Leonavallo's Pagliacci, Mozart's The Abduction from the Seraglio, and Verdi's Otello, all sung in English. Since then the company has presented performances of more than 100 different operas.
