= List of awards and nominations received by Scott Rudin =

Scott Rudin awards and nominations
Awards and nominations
| Award | Wins | Nominations |
| Academy Awards | 1 | 10 |
| BAFTA Awards | 0 | 10 |
| Emmy Awards | 1 | 5 |
| Golden Globes | 4 | 15 |
| Grammy Awards | 1 | 1 |
| Tony Awards | 19 | 49 |
| Indie Spirit Awards | 0 | 7 |

Totals (Note: Certain award groups do not simply award one winner. They acknowledge several different recipients, have runners-up, and have third place. Since this is a specific recognition and is different from losing an award, runner-up mentions are considered wins in this award tally. For simplification and to avoid errors, each award in this list has been presumed to have had a prior nomination.)
- Wins: 76
- Nominations: 260

Scott Rudin is an American film, television and theater producer. Among his numerous accolades as a film and theatrical producer, Rudin has won an Academy Award, sixteen Drama Desk Awards, an Emmy Award, a Grammy Award, four Golden Globe Awards and nineteen Tony Awards. Additionally, he has been nominated for ten British Academy Film Awards. With his Grammy win for The Book of Mormon in 2012, he became one of the few people who have won an Emmy, Grammy, Oscar and Tony Award, and the first producer to do so.

He won the Academy Award for Best Picture as a producer of the Joel and Ethan Coen crime thriller No Country for Old Men (2007). He was Oscar-nominated for producing the films The Hours (2002), No Country for Old Men (2007), True Grit (2010), The Social Network (2010), Extremely Loud & Incredibly Close (2011), Captain Phillips (2013), The Grand Budapest Hotel (2014), Fences (2016), and Lady Bird (2017). He also was nominated for the Academy Award for Best Animated Feature for the Wes Anderson stop-motion film Isle of Dogs (2018).

For producing numerous plays and musicals on Broadway he has received 19 Tony Awards out of 49 nominations. He won the Tony Award for Best Musical twice for Passion (1994) and The Book of Mormon (2011) and the Tony Award for Best Revival of a Musical once for Hello, Dolly! (2017). He won the Tony Award for Best Play nine times for Copenhagen (2000), The Goat, or Who Is Sylvia? (2002), Doubt (2005), The History Boys (2006), God of Carnage (2009), The Curious Incident of the Dog in the Night-Time (2015), The Humans (2016), The Ferryman (2017), and The Inheritance (2020). He won the Tony Award for Best Revival of a Play seven times for Fences (2010), Death of a Salesman (2012), A Raisin in the Sun (2014), Skylight (2015), A View from the Bridge (2016), The Boys in the Band (2019), and Death of a Salesman (2026).

On television, he won the Primetime Emmy Award for Outstanding Children's Program for the documentary He Makes Me Feel Like Dancin' (1984). He was Emmy-nominated for the miniseries Little Gloria... Happy at Last (1983), the children's series School of Rock (2017), and the comedy What We Do in the Shadows (2020). He won the Grammy Award for Best Musical Theater Album for The Book of Mormon (2011).

== Film and television ==
=== Academy Awards ===
| Year | Category | Nominated work | Result | Ref. |
|---|---|---|---|---|
| 2003 | Best Picture | The Hours | Nominated | |
| 2008 | Best Picture | No Country for Old Men | Won | |
| 2011 | Best Picture | True Grit | Nominated | |
| 2011 | Best Picture | The Social Network | Nominated | |
| 2012 | Best Picture | Extremely Loud & Incredibly Close | Nominated | |
| 2014 | Best Picture | Captain Phillips | Nominated | |
| 2015 | Best Picture | The Grand Budapest Hotel | Nominated | |
| 2017 | Best Picture | Fences | Nominated | |
| 2018 | Best Picture | Lady Bird | Nominated | |
| 2019 | Best Animated Feature | Isle of Dogs | Nominated | |

=== British Academy Film Awards ===
| Year | Category | Nominated work | Result | Ref. |
|---|---|---|---|---|
| 1999 | Best Film | The Truman Show | Nominated | |
| 2002 | Best Film of British Production | Iris | Nominated | |
| 2003 | Best Film of British Production | The Hours | Nominated | |
| 2003 | Best Film | The Hours | Nominated | |
| 2007 | Best Film of British Production | Notes on a Scandal | Nominated | |
| 2008 | Best Film | No Country for Old Men | Nominated | |
| 2011 | Best Film | True Grit | Nominated | |
| 2011 | Best Film | The Social Network | Nominated | |
| 2014 | Best Film | Captain Phillips | Nominated | |
| 2015 | Best Film | The Grand Budapest Hotel | Nominated | |

=== Emmy Awards ===
| Year | Category | Nominated work | Result | Ref. |
Primetime Emmy Awards
| 1983 | Outstanding Drama Special | Little Gloria... Happy at Last | Nominated | |
| 1984 | Outstanding Children's Program | He Makes Me Feel Like Dancin' | Won | |
| 2017 | Outstanding Children's Program | School of Rock | Nominated | |
| 2020 | Outstanding Comedy Series | What We Do in the Shadows | Nominated | |
Daytime Emmy Awards
| 1984 | Outstanding Children's Special | He Makes Me Feel Like Dancin' | Nominated | |

=== Golden Globe Awards ===
| Year | Category | Nominated work | Result | Ref. |
|---|---|---|---|---|
| 1993 | Best Motion Picture – Musical or Comedy | Sister Act | Nominated | |
| 1996 | Best Motion Picture – Musical or Comedy | Sabrina | Nominated | |
| 2003 | Best Motion Picture – Drama | The Hours | Won | |
| 2008 | Best Motion Picture – Drama | No Country for Old Men | Nominated | |
| 2009 | Best Motion Picture – Drama | The Reader | Nominated | |
| 2009 | Best Motion Picture – Drama | Revolutionary Road | Nominated | |
| 2010 | Best Motion Picture – Musical or Comedy | It's Complicated | Nominated | |
| 2011 | Best Motion Picture – Drama | The Social Network | Won | |
| 2013 | Best Motion Picture – Musical or Comedy | Moonrise Kingdom | Nominated | |
| 2013 | Best Television Series – Drama | The Newsroom | Nominated | |
| 2014 | Best Motion Picture – Drama | Captain Phillips | Nominated | |
| 2014 | Best Motion Picture – Musical or Comedy | Inside Llewyn Davis | Nominated | |
| 2015 | Best Motion Picture – Musical or Comedy | The Grand Budapest Hotel | Won | |
| 2018 | Best Motion Picture – Musical or Comedy | Lady Bird | Won | |
| 2019 | Best Motion Picture – Animated | Isle of Dogs | Nominated | |

=== Miscellaneous awards ===
| Organizations | Year | Category | Work | Result | Ref. |
|---|---|---|---|---|---|
| AACTA Awards | 2014 | Best Film | Captain Phillips | Nominated | |
| AACTA Awards | 2015 | Best Film | The Grand Budapest Hotel | Nominated | |
| AACTA Awards | 2018 | Best Film | Lady Bird | Nominated | |
| Alliance of Women Film Journalists | 2007 | Best Film | No Country for Old Men | Won | |
| Alliance of Women Film Journalists | 2011 | Best Film | The Social Network | Won | |
| Alliance of Women Film Journalists | 2013 | Best Film | Inside Llewyn Davis | Nominated | |
| Alliance of Women Film Journalists | 2015 | Best Film | The Grand Budapest Hotel | Nominated | |
| Annie Award | 2019 | Best Animated Feature | Isle of Dogs | Nominated | |
| Australian Film Institute | 1999 | Best Foreign Film | The Truman Show | Nominated | |
| Australian Film Institute | 2003 | Best Foreign Film | The Hours | Nominated | |
| Black Reel Award | 2015 | Outstanding Film | Top Five | Nominated | |
| Black Reel Award | 2017 | Outstanding Film | Fences | Nominated | |
| Golden Raspberry Awards | 2022 | Worst Picture | The Woman in the Window | Nominated | |
| Gotham Awards | 2004 | Best Feature | I Heart Huckabees | Nominated | |
| Gotham Awards | 2007 | Best Feature | Margot at the Wedding | Nominated | |
| Gotham Awards | 2012 | Best Feature | Moonrise Kingdom | Won | |
| Gotham Awards | 2013 | Best Feature | Inside Llewyn Davis | Won | |
| Gotham Awards | 2014 | Best Feature | The Grand Budapest Hotel | Nominated | |
| Gotham Awards | 2014 | Audience Award | The Grand Budapest Hotel | Nominated | |
| Gotham Awards | 2017 | Audience Award | Lady Bird | Nominated | |
| Gotham Awards | 2018 | Audience Award | Eighth Grade | Nominated | |
| Gotham Awards | 2019 | Audience Award | Uncut Gems | Nominated | |
| Gotham Awards | 2019 | Best Feature | Uncut Gems | Nominated | |
| Independent Spirit Awards | 2011 | Best Feature | Greenberg | Nominated | |
| Independent Spirit Awards | 2013 | Best Feature | Moonrise Kingdom | Nominated | |
| Independent Spirit Awards | 2014 | Best Feature | Frances Ha | Nominated | |
| Independent Spirit Awards | 2014 | Best Feature | Inside Llewyn Davis | Nominated | |
| Independent Spirit Awards | 2018 | Best Feature | Lady Bird | Nominated | |
| Independent Spirit Awards | 2019 | Best Feature | Eighth Grade | Nominated | |
| Independent Spirit Awards | 2020 | Best Feature | Uncut Gems | Nominated | |
| Producers Guild of America Awards | 2008 | Best Theatrical Motion Pictures | No Country for Old Men | Won | |
| Producers Guild of America Awards | 2010 | Best Animated Motion Pictures | Fantastic Mr. Fox | Nominated | |
| Producers Guild of America Awards | 2011 | Best Theatrical Motion Picture | True Grit | Nominated | |
| Producers Guild of America Awards | 2011 | Best Theatrical Motion Picture | The Social Network | Nominated | |
| Producers Guild of America Awards | 2011 | David O. Selznick Achievement Award | —N/a | Won | |
| Producers Guild of America Awards | 2012 | Best Theatrical Motion Picture | The Girl with the Dragon Tattoo | Nominated | |
| Producers Guild of America Awards | 2013 | Best Theatrical Motion Picture | Moonrise Kingdom | Nominated | |
| Producers Guild of America Awards | 2014 | Best Theatrical Motion Picture | Captain Phillips | Nominated | |
| Producers Guild of America Awards | 2015 | Best Theatrical Motion Picture | The Grand Budapest Hotel | Nominated | |
| Producers Guild of America Awards | 2017 | Best Theatrical Motion Picture | Fences | Nominated | |
| Producers Guild of America Awards | 2018 | Best Theatrical Motion Picture | Lady Bird | Nominated | |
| Producers Guild of America Awards | 2019 | Best Animated Theatrical Motion Picture | Isle of Dogs | Nominated | |
| Producers Guild of America Awards | 2021 | Best Episodic Television – Comedy | What We Do in the Shadows | Nominated | |
| Satellite Award | 1998 | Best Film – Musical or Comedy | In & Out | Nominated | |
| Satellite Award | 2018 | Best Film | Lady Bird | Nominated | |
| Satellite Award | 2019 | Best Animated or Mixed Media Feature | Isle of Dogs | Won | |

== Theatre ==
=== Tony Awards ===
| Year | Category | Nominated work | Result | Ref. |
|---|---|---|---|---|
| 1994 | Best Musical | Passion | Won | |
| 1995 | Best Revival of a Play | Hamlet | Nominated | |
| 1995 | Best Play | Indiscretions | Nominated | |
| 1996 | Best Revival of a Musical | A Funny Thing Happened on the Way to the Forum | Nominated | |
| 1996 | Best Play | Seven Guitars | Nominated | |
| 1997 | Best Play | Skylight | Nominated | |
| 1998 | Best Revival of a Play | The Chairs | Nominated | |
| 1999 | Best Play | Closer | Nominated | |
| 2000 | Best Play | The Ride Down Mt. Morgan | Nominated | |
| 2000 | Best Play | Copenhagen | Won | |
| 2000 | Best Musical | The Wild Party | Nominated | |
| 2002 | Best Play | The Goat, or Who Is Sylvia? | Won | |
| 2004 | Best Musical | Caroline, or Change | Nominated | |
| 2005 | Best Revival of a Play | Who's Afraid of Virginia Woolf? | Nominated | |
| 2005 | Best Play | Doubt | Won | |
| 2006 | Best Revival of a Play | Faith Healer | Nominated | |
| 2006 | Best Play | Shining City | Nominated | |
| 2006 | Best Play | The History Boys | Won | |
| 2008 | Best Revival of a Musical | Gypsy | Nominated | |
| 2009 | Best Play | God of Carnage | Won | |
| 2010 | Best Revival of a Play | Fences | Won | |
| 2011 | Best Play | The Motherfucker with the Hat | Nominated | |
| 2011 | Best Play | Jerusalem | Nominated | |
| 2011 | Best Musical | The Book of Mormon | Won | |
| 2012 | Best Revival of a Play | Death of a Salesman | Won | |
| 2013 | Best Play | The Testament of Mary | Nominated | |
| 2014 | Best Revival of a Play | A Raisin in the Sun | Won | |
| 2015 | Best Revival of a Play | This Is Our Youth | Nominated | |
| 2015 | Best Revival of a Play | Skylight | Won | |
| 2015 | Best Play | The Curious Incident of the Dog in the Night-Time | Won | |
| 2016 | Best Revival of a Play | The Crucible | Nominated | |
| 2016 | Best Revival of a Play | Blackbird | Nominated | |
| 2016 | Best Revival of a Play | A View From the Bridge | Won | |
| 2016 | Best Play | King Charles III | Nominated | |
| 2016 | Best Play | The Humans | Won | |
| 2016 | Best Musical | Shuffle Along, or, the Making of the Musical Sensation of 1921 and All That Followed | Nominated | |
| 2017 | Best Play | A Doll's House, Part 2 | Nominated | |
| 2017 | Best Play | Sweat | Nominated | |
| 2017 | Best Revival of a Musical | Hello, Dolly! | Won | |
| 2018 | Best Revival of a Play | Three Tall Women | Nominated | |
| 2018 | Best Revival of a Play | The Iceman Cometh | Nominated | |
| 2018 | Best Revival of a Musical | Carousel | Nominated | |
| 2019 | Best Play | The Ferryman | Won | |
| 2019 | Best Play | Gary: A Sequel to Titus Andronicus | Nominated | |
| 2019 | Best Revival of a Play | The Boys in the Band | Won | |
| 2019 | Best Revival of a Play | The Waverly Gallery | Nominated | |
| 2020 | Best Play | The Inheritance | Won | |
| 2026 | Best Play | Little Bear Ridge Road | Nominated | |
| 2026 | Best Revival of a Play | Death of a Salesman | Won | |

=== Drama Desk Awards ===
| Year | Category | Nominated work | Result | Ref. |
|---|---|---|---|---|
| 1994 | Outstanding Musical | Passion | Won | |
| 1995 | Outstanding Revival of a Play | Indiscretions | Nominated | |
| 1996 | Outstanding Play | Seven Guitars | Nominated | |
| 1996 | Outstanding Revival of a Musical | A Funny Thing Happened on the Way to the Forum | Nominated | |
| 1998 | Outstanding Revival of a Play | The Chairs | Nominated | |
| 1999 | Outstanding Play | The Ride Down Mt. Morgan | Nominated | |
| 1999 | Outstanding Play | Closer | Nominated | |
| 2000 | Outstanding Play | Copenhagen | Won | |
| 2002 | Outstanding Play | The Goat, or Who Is Sylvia? | Won | |
| 2003 | Outstanding Revival of a Play | Medea | Nominated | |
| 2004 | Outstanding Musical | Caroline, or Change | Nominated | |
| 2005 | Outstanding Revival of a Play | Who's Afraid of Virginia Woolf? | Nominated | |
| 2005 | Outstanding Play | Doubt | Won | |
| 2006 | Outstanding Play | The History Boys | Won | |
| 2008 | Outstanding Revival of a Musical | Gypsy | Nominated | |
| 2009 | Outstanding Revival of a Play | Exit the King | Nominated | |
| 2010 | Outstanding Revival of a Play | Fences | Won | |
| 2011 | Outstanding Revival of a Play | The House of Blue Leaves | Nominated | |
| 2011 | Outstanding Play | The Motherfucker with the Hat | Nominated | |
| 2011 | Outstanding Musical | The Book of Mormon | Won | |
| 2012 | Outstanding Revival of a Play | Death of a Salesman | Won | |
| 2015 | Outstanding Play | The Curious Incident of the Dog in the Night-Time | Won | |
| 2016 | Outstanding Revival of a Play | A View From the Bridge | Won | |
| 2016 | Outstanding Play | King Charles III | Nominated | |
| 2016 | Outstanding Play | The Humans | Won | |
| 2016 | Outstanding Musical | Shuffle Along, Or The Making of the Musical Sensation of 1921 and All That Followed | Won | |
| 2017 | Outstanding Play | Sweat | Nominated | |
| 2017 | Outstanding Revival of a Play | The Front Page | Nominated | |
| 2017 | Outstanding Revival of a Musical | Hello, Dolly! | Won | |
| 2018 | Outstanding Revival of a Play | Three Tall Women | Nominated | |
| 2018 | Outstanding Revival of a Musical | Carousel | Nominated | |
| 2019 | Outstanding Play | The Ferryman | Won | |
| 2019 | Outstanding Revival of a Play | The Waverly Gallery | Won | |
| 2020 | Outstanding Play | The Inheritance | Won | |
| 2020 | Outstanding Revival of a Musical | West Side Story | Nominated | |
| 2026 | Outstanding Revival of a Play | Death of a Salesman | Won | |

=== Drama League Awards ===
| Year | Category | Nominated work | Result | Ref. |
|---|---|---|---|---|
| 1996 | Outstanding Production of a Play | Seven Guitars | Won | |
| 1996 | Outstanding Revival | A Funny Thing Happened on the Way to the Forum | Nominated | |
| 1998 | Outstanding Revival | The Chairs | Nominated | |
| 2000 | Outstanding Production of a Play | Copenhagen | Won | |
| 2000 | Outstanding Production of a Musical | The Wild Party | Nominated | |
| 2004 | Outstanding Production of a Musical | Caroline, or Change | Nominated | |
| 2004 | Outstanding Revival of a Play | Beckett/Albee | Nominated | |
| 2005 | Outstanding Production of a Play | Doubt | Won | |
| 2005 | Outstanding Revival of a Play | Who's Afraid of Virginia Woolf? | Nominated | |
| 2006 | Outstanding Production of a Play | The History Boys | Won | |
| 2006 | Outstanding Revival of a Play | Faith Healer | Nominated | |
| 2007 | Outstanding Production of a Play | The Year of Magical Thinking | Nominated | |
| 2008 | Outstanding Revival of a Play | Gypsy | Nominated | |
| 2009 | Outstanding Production of a Play | God of Carnage | Won | |
| 2009 | Outstanding Revival of a Play | Exit the King | Nominated | |
| 2010 | Outstanding Production of a Play | A Behanding in Spokane | Nominated | |
| 2010 | Outstanding Revival of a Play | Fences | Nominated | |
| 2011 | Outstanding Production of a Play | Jerusalem | Nominated | |
| 2011 | Outstanding Production of a Play | The Motherf**ker with the Hat | Nominated | |
| 2011 | Outstanding Production of a Musical | The Book of Mormom | Won | |
| 2011 | Outstanding Revival of a Play | The House of Blue Leaves | Nominated | |
| 2012 | Outstanding Production of a Play | One Man, Two Guvnors | Nominated | |
| 2012 | Outstanding Revival of a Play | Death of a Salesman | Won | |
| 2013 | Outstanding Production of a Play | The Testament of Mary | Nominated | |
| 2014 | Outstanding Revival of a Play | A Raisin in the Sun | Nominated | |
| 2015 | Outstanding Production of a Play | The Audience | Nominated | |
| 2015 | Outstanding Production of a Play | The Curious Incident of the Dog in the Night-Time | Won | |
| 2015 | Outstanding Revival of a Play | The Iceman Cometh | Nominated | |
| 2015 | Outstanding Revival of a Play | Skylight | Nominated | |
| 2015 | Outstanding Revival of a Play | This Is Our Youth | Nominated | |
| 2016 | Outstanding Production of a Play | The Humans | Won | |
| 2016 | Outstanding Production of a Play | King Charles III | Nominated | |
| 2016 | Outstanding Revival of a Play | Blackbird | Nominated | |
| 2016 | Outstanding Revival of a Play | The Crucible | Nominated | |
| 2016 | Outstanding Revival of a Play | A View from the Bridge | Won | |
| 2017 | Outstanding Production of a Play | A Doll’s House, Part 2 | Nominated | |
| 2017 | Outstanding Production of a Play | Sweat | Nominated | |
| 2017 | Outstanding Revival of a Musical | Hello, Dolly! | Won | |
| 2018 | Outstanding Production of a Play | Meteor Shower | Nominated | |
| 2018 | Outstanding Revival of a Play | The Iceman Cometh | Nominated | |
| 2018 | Outstanding Revival of a Play | Three Tall Women | Nominated | |
| 2018 | Outstanding Revival of a Musical | Carousel | Nominated | |
| 2019 | Outstanding Production of a Play | The Ferryman | Won | |
| 2019 | Outstanding Production of a Play | Gary: A Sequel to Titus Andronicus | Nominated | |
| 2019 | Outstanding Production of a Play | To Kill a Mockingbird | Nominated | |
| 2019 | Outstanding Revival of a Play | King Lear | Nominated | |
| 2019 | Outstanding Revival of a Play | The Waverly Gallery | Won | |
| 2020 | Outstanding Production of a Play | The Inheritance | Won | |
| 2020 | Outstanding Revival of a Musical | West Side Story | Nominated | |
| 2026 | Outstanding Revival of a Play | Death of a Salesman | Won | |

=== Lucille Lortel Awards ===
| Year | Category | Nominated work | Result | Ref. |
|---|---|---|---|---|
| 2006 | Outstanding Play | Red Light Winter | Nominated | |
| 2013 | Outstanding Play | Cock | Nominated | |
| 2015 | Outstanding Solo Show | Every Brilliant Thing | Nominated | |

=== Outer Critics Circle Awards ===
| Year | Category | Nominated work | Result | Ref. |
|---|---|---|---|---|
| 1995 | Best Broadway Musical | Passion | Nominated | |
| 1995 | Best Revival – Play | Hamlet | Nominated | |
| 1996 | Best Broadway Play | Seven Guitars | Nominated | |
| 1998 | Best Revival – Musical | On the Town | Nominated | |
| 1999 | Outstanding Broadway Play | Amy's View | Nominated | |
| 1999 | Outstanding Broadway Play | Closer | Nominated | |
| 2000 | Outstanding Broadway Play | Copenhagen | Won | |
| 2000 | Outstanding Off-Broadway Musical | The Wild Party | Won | |
| 2002 | Outstanding Broadway Play | The Goat, or Who Is Sylvia? | Won | |
| 2004 | Outstanding Broadway Musical | Caroline, or Change | Nominated | |
| 2005 | Outstanding Revival of a Play | Who’s Afraid of Virginia Woolf? | Nominated | |
| 2005 | Outstanding Broadway Play | Doubt | Won | |
| 2006 | Outstanding Broadway Play | The History Boys | Won | |
| 2008 | Outstanding Revival of a Musical | Gypsy | Nominated | |
| 2009 | Outstanding New Broadway Play | God of Carnage | Won | |
| 2010 | Outstanding Revival of a Play | Fences | Won | |
| 2011 | Outstanding New Broadway Musical | The Book of Mormon | Won | |
| 2011 | Outstanding New Broadway Play | The Motherf**ker With the Hat | Nominated | |
| 2012 | Outstanding New Broadway Play | One Man, Two Guvnors | Won | |
| 2012 | Outstanding Revival of a Play | Death of a Salesman | Won | |
| 2013 | Outstanding New Off-Broadway Play | Cock | Nominated | |
| 2013 | Outstanding New Broadway Play | The Testament of Mary | Nominated | |
| 2015 | Outstanding New Broadway Play | The Audience | Nominated | |
| 2015 | Outstanding New Broadway Play | The Curious Incident of the Dog in the Night-Time | Won | |
| 2015 | Outstanding Revival of a Play | Skylight | Nominated | |
| 2016 | Outstanding New Broadway Play | The Humans | Won | |
| 2016 | Outstanding New Broadway Play | King Charles III | Nominated | |
| 2016 | Outstanding Revival of a Play | Blackbird | Nominated | |
| 2016 | Outstanding Revival of a Play | The Crucible | Nominated | |
| 2016 | Outstanding Revival of a Play | A View From the Bridge | Nominated | |
| 2017 | Outstanding New Broadway Play | A Doll's House, Part 2 | Nominated | |
| 2017 | Outstanding New Broadway Play | Sweat | Nominated | |
| 2017 | Outstanding Revival of a Play | The Front Page | Nominated | |
| 2017 | Outstanding Revival of a Musical | Hello, Dolly! | Won | |
| 2018 | Outstanding Revival of a Play | Three Tall Women | Nominated | |
| 2018 | Outstanding Revival of a Musical | Carousel | Nominated | |
| 2019 | Outstanding New Broadway Play | The Ferryman | Won | |
| 2019 | Outstanding New Broadway Play | To Kill a Mockingbird | Nominated | |
| 2019 | Outstanding Revival of a Play | The Waverly Gallery | Nominated | |
| 2020 | Outstanding New Broadway Play | The Inheritance | Won | |
| 2020 | Outstanding Revival of a Musical | West Side Story | Won | |
| 2026 | Outstanding New Broadway Play | Little Bear Ridge Road | Nominated | |
| 2026 | Outstanding Revival of a Play | Death of a Salesman | Won | |

== Music ==
=== Grammy Awards ===
| Year | Category | Nominated work | Result | Ref. |
|---|---|---|---|---|
| 2012 | Best Musical Theater Album | The Book of Mormon | Won | |
