= Noel Katz =

American composer

Noel Katz

Noel Katz is an American composer and lyricist. He is best known for Such Good Friends, an original musical comedy presented at the fourth annual New York Musical Theatre Festival in 2007, where it won five awards, including Talkin’ Broadway’s Citation as the season’s best musical. It tells the story of three old friends working together in the early years of live television who are forced to name names before the House Un-American Activities Committee, and the consequences of the different choices each character makes. The NYMF presentation of Such Good Friends featured Tony nominees Liz Larsen and Brad Oscar.

Katz composed Our Wedding, The Musical, a musical written for his own actual wedding, which was featured in The New York Times in 2003.

He has composed scores for a variety of Second City (NY) improv-based revues, including We Built This City on Rent Control, A Time For Heroes and Hoagies, and Generation F’d. He has also taught song improvisation at Fairleigh Dickinson University, Circle in the Square and the National Dance Institute.

== Works ==
- Through the Wardrobe
- Murder at the Savoy
- The Heavenly Theatre (composer)
- The New U.
- On the Brink
- Not a Lion
- The Christmas Bride
- The Company of Women
- Spilt Milk
- The Pirate Captains
- The Making of "Larry: The Musical"
- The Love Contract
- Area 51
- Our Wedding
- Such Good Friends
- Learning Curve, a short musical film created as part of Ripfest #11 (lyricist/screenwriter)
- Identity
- Camp Ginger
- Rehearsing For Life
- Out of Our Heads
- Catch Me When I Fall
- Unmasked
