= Fanfare (ballet) =

- Choreographer: Jerome Robbins
- Music: Benjamin Britten
- Premiere: June 2, 1953; City Center of Music and Drama
- Original ballet company: New York City Ballet
- Genre: Neoclassical ballet

Fanfare is a one-act ballet choreographed by Jerome Robbins to Benjamin Britten's The Young Person's Guide to the Orchestra, in celebration of the Coronation of Queen Elizabeth II. The ballet premiered on June 2, 1953, the night of the coronation, at the City Center of Music and Drama, danced by the New York City Ballet.

== Structure ==
The ballet starts with a majordomo on stage reading Britten's explanatory text from the score, then proceeds to an ensemble performance with dancers representing different instruments, including three women as a piccolo and two flutes, a woman as the oboe, a man and a woman as the clarinets, two men as the bassoons, a man and a woman as the violas, three women as the cellos, a man as the double bass, a woman as the harp, two men as trumpets, four men as a tuba and three trombones and three men as the percussion instruments. There are no major solos in the ballet.

== Production ==
According to Deborah Jowitt's biography of Jerome Robbins, it is believed that George Balanchine and Lincoln Kirstein, both New York City Ballet co-founders and Anglophiles, requested Robbins to create a new ballet on the occasion of the Coronation of Queen Elizabeth II. Balanchine wanted to contribute to the ballet. When Robbins was unavailable, he requested Balanchine to lead a rehearsal, but Balanchine added his touch to the choreography, which Robbins reversed once he found out. Balanchine would say "I fixed, but you changed" to Robbins whenever Fanfare was revived.

The ballet is set to Britten's The Young Person's Guide to the Orchestra, which is based on a theme by Henry Purcell and was commissioned for the 1946 BBC documentary, Instruments of the Orchestra. At the premiere, the costumes and set were uncredited, though Irene Sharaff was later credited.

== Performances ==
The program on which Fanfare had its premiere, which was also the day of the coronation, was curated by Kirstein to honor British choreographers, composers and designers, though Robbins was born in Manhattan. It started with an address made by Major-General William Dimoline of the British Army. Then, Walton's Orb and Sceptre, which was used at the coronation earlier, was performed by the orchestra. Following performances of two ballets by choreographer Frederick Ashton and Swan Lake, Fanfare had its premiere.

The New York City Ballet revives Fanfare infrequently, and the ballet was absent from the repertory between 1978 and 1987. Fanfare was included in the 2008 Jerome Robbins Celebration program, then was absent from the repertory again until the Robbins centenary program in the 2017/18 season. Actors who have been the majordomo include Eric Swanson, David Jaffe, Bill Nolte, David Lowenstein, and David Aaron Baker. In 2020, in response to the impact of the coronavirus pandemic on the performing arts, the New York City Ballet released a video excerpt of the ballet.

The School of American Ballet, the affiliated school of the New York City Ballet, have included Fanfare in their annual workshop performances. Robbins staged Fanfare for the Royal Danish Ballet in 1956. The Pacific Northwest Ballet have also performed the ballet with minor changes.

== Original cast ==
Original cast:

- Yvonne Mounsey
- Carolyn George
- Jillana
- Irene Larsson
- Jacques d'Amboise
- Edward Bigelow
- Todd Bolender
- Robert Fletcher
- Frank Hobi
- Michael Maule
