= Michelle Bitting =

American poet

Michelle Bitting (born February, 1964 in Los Angeles, California) is an American poet. On March 8, 2012, she was named Poet Laureate of Pacific Palisades, California.

== Early life and education ==
Bitting grew up in Pacific Palisades. Studied theater at the University of California, Berkeley and pursued careers in dance and culinary arts before turning her focus to writing in 2001. She received an MFA in writing and poetry from Pacific University, in 2009. and a PhD in mythological studies at Pacifica Graduate Institute.

== Career ==
She teaches at Loyola Marymount University.

Bitting is the author of three collections of poetry: Notes to the Beloved (Winner of the Sacramento Poetry Center Book Award, 2011), Good Friday Kiss (C&R Press, 2008), and Blue Laws (Finishing Line Press, 2007). Good Friday Kiss was chosen by Thomas Lux as the winner of the 2007 DeNovo Prize for 1st Book of Poetry.

Publications that have printed her poetry and fiction include American Poetry Review, Narrative Magazine, Prairie Schooner, Verse Daily, Poetry Daily, LA Weekly, Rattle, diode, and The Cortland Review.

In collaboration with her husband, actor Phil Abrams, Bitting adapted a number of her works for the visual medium known as poem films, some of which were presented by Atticus Review, Cheek Teeth, and Moving Poems.

Bitting collaborated with the non-profit California Dance Institute to implement a poetry component within its inner city middle school performing arts program for the Los Angeles Unified School District. She has taught poetry in the University of California, Los Angeles Writer's Program, and is also a California Poet in the Schools, serving hundreds of students in Southern California. Her poetry outreach work also includes teaching the incarcerated at Twin Towers Correctional Facility in Los Angeles, CA with grants from Poets and Writers Magazine. She is leading a Youth Poetry Project at Westside.

== Personal life ==
Bitting lives in Los Angeles with her husband, Phil Abrams, and their two children.

== Awards ==
Bitting's first collection, Good Friday Kiss (2008, C&R Press) was chosen by Thomas Lux as the winner of the DeNovo First Book Award. Her second collection, Notes to the Beloved (2012, SPC Press) won the Sacramento Poetry Center Book Award and received a starred review from Kirkus Reviews. A third collection, The Couple Who Fell to Earth (2016, C&R Press) also received a starred review and was named to Kirkus Reviews' Best Books of 2016. She has won the Beyond Baroque Foundation, Virginia Brendemuehl, and Glimmer Train poetry contests, and has been a finalist for the Poet's & Writer's Magazine California Exchange, the Rona Jaffe Foundation, the Julia Peterkin, among others.

- 2004 - Glimmer Train Poetry Contest for "Trees"
- 2005 - Rock & Sling’s Virginia Brendemuehl Prize for "Good Friday Kiss"
- 2007 - DeNovo First Book Award, C & R Press, for "Good Friday Kiss"
- 2011 - Sacramento Poetry Center Book Award
- 2011 - Beyond Baroque Foundation Poetry Award
- 2018 - Mark Fischer Poetry Prize

== Works ==
Bitting's poems have been published or are forthcoming in American Poetry Review, Prairie Schooner, The Paris-American, Narrative, The New York Times, Plume, River Styx, The L.A. Weekly, Crab Orchard Review, Rattle, diode, Linebreak, Anti-, Poemeleon, Passages North, Silk Road, The Cortland and Naugatuck River Reviews, among many others.

Individual poems have been featured on Poetry Daily and Verse Daily and have been nominated for Pushcart and Best of the Net prizes. Most recently she's been nominated for - The Pablo Neruda, The American Literary Review, and Tupelo Quarterly poetry prizes (2016)

=== Collections ===
- 2018 - "Broken Kingdom"
- 2017 - "Notes to the Beloved"
- 2016 - "The Couple Who Fell To Earth"
- 2012 - "Notes to the Beloved"
- 2008 - "Good Friday Kiss"
- 2007 - "Blue Laws"

=== Anthologies ===
- 2011 - Marin Center Poetry Anthology, Spring (Poems: "Faulkner Farms", "My Bukowski Life")
- 2005 - Traveling: An Anthology of Award-Winning Poetry, edited by John Reid (Poem: "Trees")
- 2002 - Emily Dickinson Awards Anthology, Vol. 7 (Poem: "At The Theme Park")

=== Selected poems ===
- 2011 - "Black Guitar"
- 2011 - "Epiphany"
- 2011 - "On Any Day Like Alice"
- 2011 - "After Four Days of Hammering Rain"
- 2011 - "Wheel of Fortune"
- 2010 - "Mammary"
- 2010 - "Open in Case of"
- 2009 - "Patti Smith"
- 2009 - "Meteor; Persimmon"
- 2009 - "Mother’s Day Omen"
- 2007 - "Little Gifts" (Micro fiction)
- 2006 - "Sacrament" (Finalist in 2005 poetry contest)

=== Poem films ===
- "In Praise of My Brother, The Painter"
- "Boys Like You"
- "The Call"

== Reviews ==
"Notes to the Beloved" brims with the language of a fully lived life. A powerful female voice, body, spirit and sensibility inhabits this book and shakes it to the core. Bitting is at her best here: unbridled, open, aware. ~ Dorianne Laux, author of "The Book of Men" and "Facts About the MoonAnna"

Richly dense in both language and insight into the human heart, Michelle Bitting's "Notes to the Beloved" is a stunning collection of poems. As a fiction writer I am thrilled particularly by her voice, by the yearning of her poetic persona for a self, for a place in the universe, that yearning being the deeply beating heart of narrative as well. She is one of my favorite poets and this book will abide in me for a long, long time to come. ~ Robert Olen Butler, author of the Pulitzer Prize-winning "A Good Scent from a Strange Mountain"

This amazing book will get inside you. "Notes to the Beloved" pulses with immediacy. The sensory language, the resolute momentum, a large and courageous heart--here is a rare, seductive wholeness. Michelle Bitting's poetry is at once personal and transcendent. What could be better? ~ Marvin Bell, author of "Vertigo" and "Mars Being Red"

The poems of Michelle Bitting's gorgeous new collection, "Notes to the Beloved", feel like exquisite origami epistles that their recipients (and her readers) are asked to unfold the way the lovers of these poems have unfolded each others bodies. These eloquent reflections on love both found and lost echo with desire, humor, and a fierce sense of continued hope, reminding us that torn valentines are sometimes the most beautiful. ~ David St. John, author of "The Auroras" and "The Face"

"...Bitting proves herself a sister poet to Anne Sexton, Sharon Olds and Sheryl St. Germain." ~ Kirkus Book Reviews, March 29th, 2012

"After reading this book not only did I understand the physical world in a more intimate and immediate way but I felt more a part of it." ~ Matthew Dickman, March 22nd, 2012: Free Verse: Notes To The Beloved, Tin House Blog

In a multi-directional “one shape” of voices, time, people, spaces Bitting takes us in and out of her all-seeing third eye poetics. We go into an orb of family, love, then we swoop out into the delight of humanity. And, in a sense, these refractions are “the self ’s / shady daguerreotype coming to surface / through exposure to light.” In day-to-day terms we find enlightenment and paradox “of death and peppermint,” of “birth and strange beauty,” of “Elysium nothingness” and “mythmaking machinery.” I find Michelle’s cosmic mechanics fused with historical platforms akimbo and the “sheen” of personal meditations, a rare accomplishment. A unique treasure of visions and voice. ~ Juan Felipe Herrera, U.S. Poet Laureate

If Louis C.K. is a comic’s comic, and Benoît Violier was a chef ’s chef, readers might think of Bitting as a poet’s poet. While she displays her wares for all to see - and admire - there is a level of excellence in her verse that should provide numerous pleasures for the connoisseur. In her new collection, she is often in conversation with poets, including Dante Alighieri, Wendell Berry, James Merrill, and Frank O’Hara. Near the heart of her book, the author gives readers in “When the Sky Makes a Certain Sign” one of those lines that might sneak into her obituary decades in the future: “Every poem’s a love poem.” And in every one of Bitting’s diamond-sharp verses, there is something to love. Readers should count themselves lucky if this sublime volume falls into their laps. With this poetry collection, the author firmly establishes herself as a powerful contemporary voice in American letters. ~ Kirkus Reviews May 2, 2016

Michelle Bitting is a poet of the natural world but in a completely Transcendental sense. Like Emerson, her poems seem to claim that, even in the face of all kinds of traumatic loss, “beauty breaks in everywhere.” The Couple Who Fell to Earth holds things of the world up to the eye in an effort to glimpse heaven, or as Bitting herself says, “Accept me. I love the dawn. / The sun is a sea / I throw myself into…” This book is all heart. ~Jericho Brown
