= Charlotte d'Amboise =

American actress

- Born: Charlotte Lorraine d'Amboise; May 11, 1964 (age 62); New York City, U.S.
- Occupations: Actress, dancer, singer
- Years active: 1978–present
- Spouse: Terrence Mann (m. 1996)
- Children: 2
- Parents: Jacques d'Amboise (father); Carolyn George (mother)
- Relatives: Christopher d'Amboise (brother)

Charlotte Lorraine d'Amboise (born May 11, 1964) is an American actress, dancer and singer. She has played starring roles in musical theatre, and has been nominated for two Tony Awards for her performances in Jerome Robbins' Broadway and A Chorus Line.

== Early life ==
Charlotte d'Amboise was born in New York City, the daughter of Jacques d'Amboise, a ballet dancer and choreographer, and Carolyn George, a ballet dancer and photographer. She has a twin sister, Catherine. Her older brother is ballet dancer and choreographer Christopher d'Amboise. As a child, she danced with the New York City Ballet, choreographed by George Balanchine and Jerome Robbins.

== Career ==
=== Musical theatre ===
D'Amboise made her Broadway debut in the musical Cats in September 1984 as Cassandra, where she met her future husband, performer Terrence Mann, who played Rum Tum Tugger.

She originated the role of Chris Hargensen in the ill-fated 1988 musical Carrie.

She frequently has played the role of Roxie Hart in Chicago, first heading the 1997 national tour and later joining the Broadway revival cast in 1999. She has appeared in productions of the musical almost every year since then.

In 2001, she replaced Karen Ziemba in Contact.

In early 2005, d'Amboise replaced Christina Applegate in the Boston leg of the pre-Broadway tour of the revival of Sweet Charity, as well as the first few weeks of previews on Broadway, following a foot injury sustained by Applegate that nearly cancelled the production. Once Applegate returned to the role in New York, d'Amboise remained as her standby while simultaneously performing the role of Roxie Hart in Chicago.

She appeared in the 2006 Broadway revival of A Chorus Line as Cassie, earning a second Tony Award nomination.

She played the role of Fastrada in the 2013 Broadway revival of Pippin, alongside her husband Terrence Mann, who played Charles.

=== Film and television ===
Her film credits include The In Crowd (1988), American Blue Note (1989), Just Off the Coast (1992) and The Preacher's Wife (1996). She is featured in Every Little Step (2008), a documentary about the 2006 Broadway revival of A Chorus Line. In 2012, she appeared in Frances Ha, directed by Noah Baumbach.

She has also appeared in several made-for-TV movies, including Alone in the Neon Jungle (1988), Lost in the Bermuda Triangle (1998), Galyntine (2014) and A Carol for Two (2024).

On television, she has appeared three times in the Kennedy Center Honors (1989 Mary Martin, 1995 Jacques d'Amboise and 2002 Chita Rivera), Law & Order (2001), a videotaped performance of the Broadway musical Contact (2002) and One Life to Live (2009).

She has danced in music videos for Blue Suede Shoes (1984), I Heard It Through the Grapevine (1984), Country Boy (1985), The Rum Tum Tugger (1985) and The Karate Rap (1986).

== Stage appearances ==
Year	Title	Role	Location	Notes
1978	The Tennis Game	not known	not known	Off-Broadway
1978	Red Eye	not known	not known	Off-Broadway
1979	Prairie Avenue	not known	Citizens Hall	Regional
1981	Toulouse	Lulu	Ukrainian Hall	Off-Broadway
1981	Time Pieces	not known	Washington Square Methodist; Episcopal Church	Off-Broadway
1983	Non Pasquale	Ensemble	Delacorte Theatre	Off-Broadway
1983–1984	Cats	Cassandra	—N/a	1st national tour
1984–1985	Cats	Cassandra	Winter Garden Theatre	Broadway (replacement)
1985–1986	Song and Dance	Woman; Woman in Blue	Royale Theatre	Broadway
1988	Carrie	Chris	Royal Shakespeare Theatre	Out-of-town tryout
1988	Carrie	Chris	Virginia Theatre	Broadway
1989	Jerome Robbins' Broadway	Anita West Side Story; Ensemble ...Forum; Peter Pan Peter Pan; 2nd Dancer Miss Liberty and Call Me Madam (understudy)	Imperial Theatre	Broadway
1991	Speed-the-Plow	Karen	Actors Theatre of Louisville	Regional
1991	Italian American; Reconciliation	not known	Dorset Theatre Festival	Regional
1992	The Dolphin Position	Cheryl	45th Street Theatre	Off-Broadway
1993	On the Town	Ivy Smith	Goodspeed Opera House	Regional
1994–1995	Damn Yankees	Lola	Marquis Theatre	Broadway (replacement)
1995	Company	Kathy	Criterion Center Stage Right	Broadway
1997–1999	Chicago	Roxie Hart	—N/a	1st national tour
1999–2025	Chicago	Roxie Hart	Shubert Theatre; Ambassador Theatre	Broadway (replacement)
2009	Chicago	Roxie Hart	Ford Center for the Performing; Arts Oriental Theatre	National tour (replacement)
2000	Tonight at 8.30	Lily Pepper Red Peppers; Victoria Gayforth Shadow Play	Williamstown Theatre Festival	Regional
2001–2002	Contact	Wife	Vivian Beaumont Theatre	Broadway (replacement)
2002	The Guys	Joan	Carolina Arts Festival	Regional
2004	Can-Can	Claudine	New York City Center	Encores!
2004	Cabaret & Main	Performer	Williamstown Theatre Festival	Regional
2005	Sweet Charity	Charity Hope Valentine (standby)	Colonial Theatre	Out-of-town tryout
2005	Sweet Charity	Charity Hope Valentine (standby)	Al Hirschfeld Theatre	Broadway
2005	The 24 Hour Plays 2005	Diana	American Airlines Theatre	Broadway
2006	A Chorus Line	Cassie	Curran Theatre	Out-of-town tryout
2006–2008	A Chorus Line	Cassie	Gerald Schoenfeld Theatre	Broadway
2009	Parade	Mrs. Phagan; Sally Slaton; Ensemble	Mark Taper Forum	Regional
2012–2013	Pippin	Fastrada	American Repertory Theater	Out-of-town tryout
2013–2015	Pippin	Fastrada	Music Box Theatre	Broadway
2014	The Lightning Thief	Oracle of Delphi; Sally Jackson	Lucille Lortel Theatre	Off-Broadway
2015	Carousel	Mrs. Mullin	Lyric Opera of Chicago	Regional
2022	The Last Supper	Naomi Day	South Orange Performing Arts; Center	Regional
2025	Steel Magnolias	M'Lynn Eatenton	Bell Theater at Bell Works	Regional
2025	A Chorus Line Official 50th Anniversary Celebration	Performer	Shubert Theatre	Broadway
2026	Tru	The Swan	House of the Redeemer	Off-Broadway
2026	Tru	The Swan	Menier Chocolate Factory	Off-West End
2026	Dear Friend: A Tribute; Concert for Scott Ellis	Performer	Studio 54	Broadway

== Awards and nominations ==
Year	Award	Category	Work	
1989	Tony Award	Best Actress in a Musical	Jerome Robbins' Broadway	Nominated
1995	Astaire Award	Outstanding Female Dancer in a Broadway Show	Damn Yankees	Won
1998	Los Angeles Stage Alliance Ovation Award	Lead Actress in a Musical	Chicago	Won
1998	Los Angeles Drama Critics Circle Award	Lead Performance	Chicago	Won
1998	San Francisco Bay Area Theatre Critics Circle Award	Best Principal Actress in a Musical	Chicago	Won
2005	TDF/Astaire Award	Special Award	Sweet Charity and Chicago	Won
2007	Tony Award	Best Featured Actress in a Musical	A Chorus Line	Nominated
2007	Drama League Award	Distinguished Performance	A Chorus Line	Nominated
2007	Outer Critics Circle Award	Outstanding Featured Actress in a Musical	A Chorus Line	Nominated
2013	Outer Critics Circle Award	Outstanding Featured Actress in a Musical	Pippin	Nominated
2013	Fred & Adele Astaire Award	Outstanding Female Dancer in a Broadway Show	Pippin	Won
2014	IRNE Award	Large Theater: Best Supporting Actress (Musical)	Pippin	Nominated

== Personal life ==
She has been married to Terrence Mann since January 20, 1996. They have two daughters, Josephine (born in 2002) and Shelby (born in 2003). Charlotte and Terrence both starred on Broadway in musicals Cats, Jerome Robbins' Broadway and the 2013 revival of Pippin.
