= He Makes Me Feel Like Dancin' =

- VHS Cover
- Directed by: Emile Ardolino
- Produced by: Emile Ardolino; Executive: Scott Rudin; Edgar J. Scherick
- Starring: Jacques d'Amboise
- Production company: Edgar J. Scherick Associates
- Distributed by: Direct Cinema; NBC (television)
- Release date: November 1983
- Running time: 60 minutes
- Country: United States
- Language: English

He Makes Me Feel Like Dancin' is a 1983 American documentary film directed by Emile Ardolino.

== Summary ==
The film is about Jacques d'Amboise, a noted former American ballet star who had dancing roles in such films as Seven Brides for Seven Brothers and Carousel, and who later founded the National Dance Institute, a dance school. Kevin Kline and Judy Collins make appearances as themselves. It aired on television on the NBC anthology series Special Treat.

== Reception ==
John J. O'Connor of The New York Times stated that the production "captured splendidly the key point of Mr. d'Amboise's efforts: Doing your best is what counts." In the educational magazine Media & Methods, Marion Bue called He Makes Me Feel Like Dancin' "engaging" and wrote that the film "captures the intensity of rehearsal and the excitement of performance."

== Accolades ==
He Makes Me Feel Like Dancin' won the 1983 Academy Award for Best Documentary Feature. After it was shown on NBC, He Makes Me Feel Like Dancin' won the 1984 Primetime Emmy Award for Outstanding Children's Program and a Peabody Award. It is one of the few theatrical films to win both an Oscar and an Emmy. It was also nominated for a Daytime Emmy Award for Outstanding Children's Entertainment Special.

The film was also named to the ALA Notable Children's Videos list in 1984.
