= Carolyn George =

American Ballerina and dance instructor

- Born: September 6, 1927
- Died: February 10, 2009 (aged 81); New York City, U.S.
- Other names: Carolyn d'Amboise
- Education: School of American Ballet and the school of the San Francisco Ballet
- Known for: Ballet
- Spouse: Jacques d'Amboise (m. 1956)
- Children: 4, including Christopher and Charlotte

Carolyn George (September 6, 1927 – February 10, 2009) was an American ballerina, photographer, and dance instructor.

== Life and career ==
Born in Dallas, Texas, George was descended from some of the first settlers in Waco, Texas. She studied at the School of American Ballet (SAB) and at the San Francisco Ballet's school. She started her professional dance career in 1952 in Broadway musicals and joined New York City Ballet (NYCB) on its European tour that year in George Balanchine's Swan Lake.

She rose to the rank of soloist, created roles in Todd Bolender's Souvenirs, William Dollar's Five Gifts and Jerome Robbins' Fanfare and appeared in the 1954 revival of On Your Toes, which Balanchine had choreographed.

It was at NYCB that she met her husband Jacques d'Amboise, whom she married on New Years Day, 1956. The couple had four children, including dancers Christopher, who is married to Kelly Crandell, and Charlotte, who is married to Terrence Mann.

Until her death George continued to work as a photographer, having begun at NYCB and SAB; her work appears in her son's autobiography Leap Year: A Year in the Life of a Dancer. She died on February 10, 2009, at her Manhattan home from primary lateral sclerosis, at the age of 81.

Photographs for the book, by Jacques d'Amboise and Hope Cooke, titled Teaching the Magic of Dance, published by Simon & Schuster.

== Reviews ==
- NY Times by John Martin, January 21, 1953
- NY Times by John Martin, May 7, 1953
- NY Times, March 1, 1954
- NY Times, September 18, 1954
- NY Times by John Martin, February 18, 1955
- Sunday NY Times by John Martin, October 23, 1955
- NY Times by John Martin, November 10, 1955
- NY Times by John Martin, November 14, 1955
- NY Times by John Martin, November 18, 1955
- NY Times, December 14, 1955
- NY Times by John Martin, March 1, 1956

== Articles ==
- Sunday NY Times by John Martin, August 24, 1958
- NY Times obituary by Anna Kisselgoff, February 12, 2009
