= The Nutcracker (1993 film) =

- Theatrical release poster
- Directed by: Emile Ardolino
- Written by: Susan Cooper (narration)
- Based on: George Balanchine's (New York City Ballet) The Nutcracker
- Produced by: Robert Hurwitz; Robert A. Krasnow
- Starring: Darci Kistler; Damian Woetzel; Kyra Nichols; Bart Robinson Cook; Macaulay Culkin; Jessica Lynn Cohen; New York City Ballet
- Narrated by: Kevin Kline
- Cinematography: Ralf D. Bode
- Edited by: Girish Bhargava
- Music by: Pyotr Ilyich Tchaikovsky
- Production companies: Elektra Entertainment; Regency Enterprises
- Distributed by: Warner Bros.
- Release date: November 24, 1993
- Running time: 92 minutes
- Country: United States
- Language: English
- Budget: $19 million
- Box office: $2.1 million

The Nutcracker, also known as George Balanchine's The Nutcracker, is a 1993 American Christmas ballet film based on Balanchine's choreography and staged for film by Peter Martins and directed by Emile Ardolino. It stars Darci Kistler, Damian Woetzel, Kyra Nichols, Bart Robinson Cook, Macaulay Culkin, Jessica Lynn Cohen, Wendy Whelan, Margaret Tracey, Gen Horiuchi, Tom Gold, and the New York City Ballet.

The film was released by Warner Bros. under their Warner Bros. Family Entertainment label on November 24, 1993, four days after director Ardolino died. It received mixed reviews and was a box office failure, grossing only $2 million.

== Plot ==
The film follows the traditional plot of The Nutcracker.

=== Act I ===
Scene 1: The Stahlbaum Home

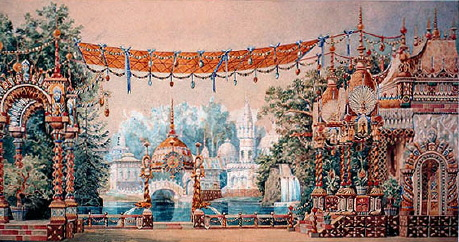
Konstantin Ivanov's original sketch for the set of The Nutcracker (1892)

It is Christmas Eve. Family and friends have gathered in the parlor to decorate the beautiful Christmas tree in preparation for the party. Once it is finished, the Stahlbaum children, Marie and Fritz, are sent for. They stare in awe at it sparkling with candles and decorations.

The party begins. A march is played. Presents are given out to the children. Suddenly, as the owl-topped grandmother clock strikes eight, a mysterious figure enters the room. It is Herr Drosselmeyer, a local councilman, magician, and Marie's godfather. He is also a talented toymaker who has brought gifts for the children, including four lifelike dolls who dance to the delight of all. He then has them put away for safekeeping.

Marie and her brother, Fritz, are sad to see the dolls being taken away, but Drosselmeyer has yet another toy for them: a wooden nutcracker carved in the shape of a little man. The other children ignore it, but Marie immediately takes a liking to it, only for Fritz to break it. Marie is heartbroken, but Drosselmeyer fixes the nutcracker, much to everyone's relief.

During the night, after everyone else has gone to bed, Marie returns to the parlor to check on her beloved nutcracker. As she reaches the little bed she put it on, the clock strikes midnight and she looks up to see Drosselmeyer perched atop it. Suddenly, mice begin to fill the room and the Christmas tree begins to grow to dizzying heights. The nutcracker also grows to life-size. Marie finds herself in the midst of a battle between an army of gingerbread soldiers and the mice, led by their king. They begin to attack the soldiers.

The nutcracker appears to lead the soldiers, who are joined by tin soldiers, and dolls who serve as doctors to carry away the wounded. As the Mouse King advances on the still-wounded nutcracker, Marie throws her slipper at him, distracting him long enough for the nutcracker to stab him.

Scene 2: A Pine Forest

The mice retreat and the nutcracker is transformed into a handsome Prince. He leads Marie through the moonlit night to a pine forest in which the snowflakes come to life and dance around them, beckoning them on to his kingdom as the first act ends.

=== Act II ===
The Land of Sweets

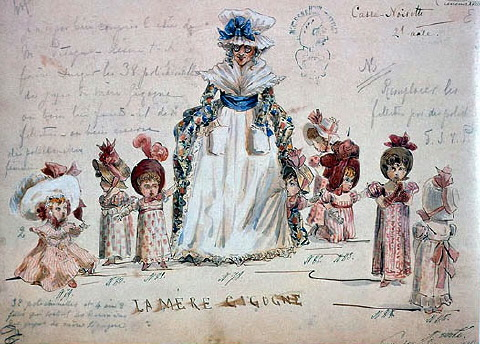
Ivan Vsevolozhsky's original costume designs for Mother Gigogne and her Polichinelle children, 1892

Marie and the Prince travel to the beautiful Land of Sweets, ruled by the Sugar Plum Fairy in the Prince's place until his return. He recounts to her how he had been saved from the Mouse King by Marie and transformed back into himself. In honor of the young heroine, a celebration of sweets from around the world is produced: chocolate from Spain, coffee from Arabia, tea from China, and candy canes from Russia all dance for their amusement; Marzipan shepherdesses perform on their flutes; Mother Ginger has her children, the Polichinelles, emerge from under her enormous hoop skirt to dance; a string of beautiful flowers perform a waltz. To conclude the night, the Sugar Plum Fairy and her Cavalier perform a dance.

A final waltz is performed by all the sweets, after which the Sugar Plum Fairy ushers Marie and the Prince down from their throne. He bows to her, kisses Marie goodbye, and leads them to a reindeer-drawn sleigh. It takes off as they wave goodbye to all the subjects who wave back.

== Cast ==
- Darci Kistler as The Sugar Plum Fairy
- Damian Woetzel as The Sugar Plum Fairy's Cavalier
- Kyra Nichols as Dewdrop
- Wendy Whelan as Coffee
- Margaret Tracey as Marzipan
- Gen Horiuchi as Tea
- Tom Gold as Candy Cane
- Lourdes López as Chocolate
- Nilas Martins as Chocolate
- William Otto as Mother Ginger
- Peter Reznick as Fritz Stahlbaum
- Karin von Aroldingen as Grandparent
- Edward Bigelow as Grandparent
- Heather Watts as Frau Stahlbaum
- Robert LaFosse as Dr. Stahlbaum
- Bart Robinson Cook as Herr Drosselmeyer
- Jessica Lynn Cohen as Marie Stahlbaum
- Macaulay Culkin as The Nutcracker/Prince/Drosselmeyer's Nephew
- Kevin Kline as Narrator
- Katrina Killian as Harlequin
- Roma Sosenko as Columbine
- Michael Byars as Soldier
- Robert D. Lyon as Mouse King
- Maureen C. McFadden Devlin as Drummer

== Production ==
Development on The Nutcracker began around Christmas 1989, when Peter Martins, Master-in-Chief of the New York City Ballet, learned that Time Warner Entertainment chairman Steve Ross wanted to produce a film with the company. Bob Krasnow, an avid ballet fan and executive of Time Warner subsidiary Elektra Records, worked on the film as a producer. George Balanchine's trust hired Emile Ardolino to direct the film and Macaulay Culkin was cast as the Nutcracker Prince due to his stardom as well as his experience dancing as Fritz Stahlbaum for the School of American Ballet during the 1989 and 1990 seasons. Initially, there had been talk of hiring a major star such as Dustin Hoffman for the role of Drosselmeyer, but the role ultimately went to dancer Bart Robinson Cook. Cinematographer Ralf D. Bode watched every film version of The Nutcracker to ever be produced in order to decide how he'd shoot the film. During production, Culkin's father and manager Kit Culkin repeatedly sparred with the producers, often threatening to withdraw his son's likeness and support in all promotional materials due to Milchan's refusal to reshoot footage, remix audio, and remove narration provided by Kevin Kline. Despite Kit Culkin's objections and demands, the narration was retained at the behest of George Balanchine's trustee Barbara Horgan.

== Reception ==
=== Critical response ===
The film received generally mixed reviews from critics. Based on eight reviews, it holds a rotten rating of 50% on review aggregator Rotten Tomatoes, with an average rating of 6/10. The film was criticized by James Berardinelli for not capturing the excitement of a live performance; he wrote that it "opts to present a relatively mundane version of the stage production...utilizing almost none of the advantages offered by the (film) medium." Roger Ebert of the Chicago Sun-Times was mixed on it, and gave it 2 out of 4 stars criticizing it for not adapting the dance for a film audience and also its casting of Culkin who, he writes, "seems peripheral to all of the action, sort of like a celebrity guest or visiting royalty, nodding benevolently from the corners of shots." In The Washington Post, Lucy Linfield echoed Ebert's criticism of Culkin, stating that "it's not so much that he can't act or dance; more important, the kid seems to have forgotten how to smile...all little Mac can muster is a surly grimace." She praised the dancing, however, as "strong, fresh and in perfect sync" and Darci Kistler's Sugar Plum Fairy as "the Balanchinean ideal of a romantic, seemingly fragile beauty combined with a technique of almost startling strength, speed and knifelike precision." The New York Times' Stephen Holden also criticized Culkin, calling his performance the film's "only serious flaw", but praised the cinematography as "very scrupulous in the way it establishes a mood of participatory excitement, then draws back far enough so that the classic ballet sequences choreographed by Balanchine and staged by Peter Martins can be seen in their full glory."

=== Box office ===
During its theatrical run, the film grossed $2,119,994. In North America, it opened at number 16 in its first weekend with $783,721.

== Home media ==
George Balanchine's The Nutcracker was released on VHS on October 25, 1994, and on DVD on November 19, 1997, by Warner Home Video.

The film was released on DVD on August 11, 2015, from 20th Century Fox Home Entertainment (now owned by Disney) through their exclusive partnership with Regency Enterprises.

== See also ==
- List of Christmas films
