= Christopher d'Amboise =

American ballet dancer and choreographer

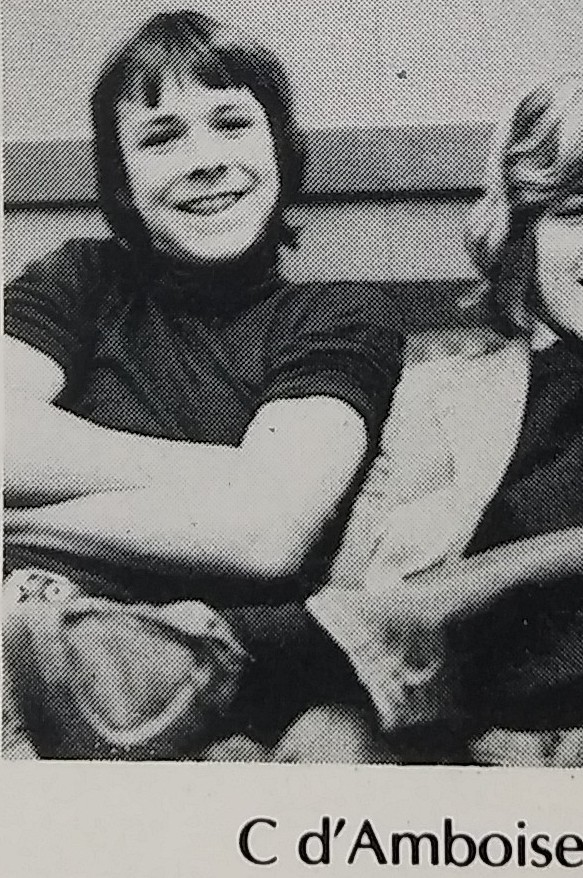
- d'Amboise in 9th grade, 1975
- Born: 1960 (age 65–66); New York City, U.S.
- Other name: Chris d'Amboise
- Education: School of American Ballet
- Known for: Ballet
- Spouse: Kelly Crandall (m. 2008)
- Parents: Jacques d'Amboise (father); Carolyn George (mother)
- Relatives: Charlotte d'Amboise (sister)

Christopher d'Amboise (born 1960) is an American danseur, choreographer, writer, and theatre director.

== Life and career ==
Born and raised in New York City, the son of dancers Jacques d'Amboise and Carolyn George, d'Amboise became a principal dancer in the New York City Ballet, where he worked closely with George Balanchine and Jerome Robbins, dancing all the major roles as well as originating several new works. His sister Charlotte d'Amboise is also a professional dancer. He quit the company in 1983 to pursue other interests, including the Broadway production of Song and Dance, which earned him a Tony Award nomination for Best Featured Actor in a Musical for a role in which he only danced.

From 1990 to 1994, d'Amboise was the artistic director, President, and CEO of the Pennsylvania Ballet, where he presented classic repertoire as well as introduced new works by contemporary choreographers.

As a choreographer, d'Amboise has created more than fifty ballets for numerous international companies, including those in San Francisco, Amsterdam, and Flanders. For the musical theatre, he has choreographed productions of High Society and the rock musical William Shakespeare's Romeo and Juliet, a project conceived by his brother-in-law, Terrence Mann.

Television credits include two appearances on the Kennedy Center Honors, Live from Studio 8H, and the Emmy Award-winning documentary He Makes Me Feel Like Dancing.

In 2007, d'Amboise wrote, directed, and choreographed The Studio, a "play with dance" about a Manhattan-based choreographer with a public image larger than life, for South Coast Repertory.

Currently, d'Amboise teaches dance at George Mason University and has been teaching unique curricula for aspiring professional dancers and choreographers, including Moving Story and other master's level classes. Conceived by d'Amboise prior to the COVID-19 pandemic, d'Amboise and the university launched the LIVE Center (also known as The Center for Live Interactive Virtual Education) in late 2020, during the height of the US COVID-19 resurgence, further uniting location-disparate and socially-distanced dancers and masters.

== Personal life ==
Chris married a fellow dancer, Kelly Crandall, in late summer of 2008.
