= California Dance Institute =

California Dance Institute (CDI) was founded in 2001 by Joffrey Ballet principal dancer Carole Valleskey. CDI was founded as a West Coast affiliate of Jacques d'Amboise's National Dance Institute. CDI teachers have all been trained in the rigorous NDI teaching methodology.

Having served over 17,000 in Los Angeles County, CDI's in-school and after-school programs provide a structured set of lessons in rhythm, music and movement. The schools served by CDI are in ethnically diverse, low-income neighborhoods. At the end of each school year, the students dance in a professionally staged production with live musical accompaniment, full costumes, and lighted backdrops.

According to founder Carole Valleskey, "Virtues are habits, and dance, as taught by CDI, is habituation in many of the skills of learning, as well as the components of good character. Dance, properly taught, is like sport, properly understood." Now adult alums of the program credit CDI with helping to shape their futures.

CDI has been supported by notables such as Angela Lansbury and George Will, as well as numerous foundations such as the Pasadena Showcase for the Arts, the Herb Alpert Foundation, and the California Arts Council.

Neuroscientist Dr. Adele Diamond has explained that CDI's methodology helps to develop Executive Function, a strong predictor of student success from Kindergarten through University and throughout life. According to Dr. Diamond, CDI helps students to develop working memory, cognitive flexibility, self-control and discipline, the three main aspects of Executive Function.

== See also ==
- National Dance Institute
- National Dance Institute of New Mexico
