= Scott Rudin =

American film, television, and theater producer (born 1958)

- Rudin's 1975 yearbook photo
- Born: July 14, 1958 (age 68); Baldwin, New York, U.S.
- Occupation: Producer
- Years active: 1978–2021, 2025–present
- Spouse: John Barlow
- Awards: Full list

Scott Rudin (born July 14, 1958) is an American film, television and theatre producer. His films include the Academy Award Best Picture-winning No Country for Old Men, as well as Uncut Gems, Lady Bird, Fences, The Girl with the Dragon Tattoo, The Social Network, South Park: Bigger, Longer & Uncut, School of Rock, Zoolander, The Truman Show, Clueless, The Addams Family, and eight Wes Anderson films. On Broadway, he has won 17 Tony Awards for shows such as The Book of Mormon, Hello, Dolly!, The Humans, A View from the Bridge, Fences and Passion.

He is one of 28 people who have won an Emmy, Grammy, Oscar, and Tony (EGOT).

Rudin stepped back in 2021 from his Broadway, film, and streaming projects after The Hollywood Reporter published allegations of abusive behavior toward his employees. In 2025, he returned to Broadway as the producer of Little Bear Ridge Road, starring Laurie Metcalf. Rudin produced two Broadway shows in the 2026 season, earning him two new Tony Awards nominations and one win.

== Early life ==
Rudin was born and raised in Baldwin, New York, on Long Island, in a Jewish family. He attributes much of his interests and behavior to his upbringing.

== Career ==
At the age of 16, he started working as an assistant to theater producer Kermit Bloomgarden. Later, Rudin worked for producers Robert Whitehead and Emanuel Azenberg. Instead of attending college, Rudin took a job as a casting director and thereafter started his own company. His new firm cast many Broadway shows, including Annie (1977) for Mike Nichols. He also cast PBS's Verna: USO Girl (1978), starring Sissy Spacek and William Hurt, and the mini-series The Scarlet Letter (1979), starring Meg Foster, Kevin Conway and John Heard, as well as the films King of the Gypsies (1978), The Wanderers (1979), Simon (1980) with Alan Arkin, and Resurrection (1980).

=== Film producer ===
In 1980, Rudin moved to Los Angeles, taking up employment at Edgar J. Scherick Associates, where he served as producer on a variety of films, including I'm Dancing as Fast as I Can (1981), the NBC miniseries Little Gloria... Happy at Last (1982), and the Oscar-winning documentary He Makes Me Feel Like Dancin' (1983).

Rudin then formed his own company, Scott Rudin Productions. His first film under that banner was Gillian Armstrong's Mrs. Soffel (1984). Not long afterwards, Rudin placed his production shingle in dormancy and joined 20th Century-Fox as an executive producer. At Fox, he met Jonathan Dolgen, a higher-level executive, with whom he worked again at Paramount Pictures years later. Rudin rose through the ranks at Fox and became president of production in 1986 at age 27.

His stint at the top of Fox was short-lived, and he soon left and entered into a producing deal with Paramount. On August 1, 1992, Rudin signed a deal with TriStar Pictures but soon moved back to Paramount. Rudin's first-look deal with Paramount lasted nearly 15 years, producing pictures including The First Wives Club, The Addams Family, Clueless, Sabrina and Sleepy Hollow.

After the resignation of Paramount's chairwoman Sherry Lansing in 2004 and the nearly simultaneous departure of Jonathan Dolgen (then president of the company), Rudin left Paramount and set a five-year first-look pact with Disney that allowed him to make films under their labels Touchstone Pictures, Walt Disney Pictures, Hollywood Pictures, and Miramax Films, whose founders Harvey and Bob Weinstein had departed. Previously, Harvey Weinstein and Rudin had public confrontations during the production of The Hours (2002), which Rudin produced for Miramax Films when it was a studio subsidiary under Disney. Rudin later said he and Weinstein "are both control freaks. We both want to run our own shows. When I'm doing a Miramax movie, I work for him. And I don't like that feeling. I chafe under that. I especially chafe under it when I feel that I'm on a leash." Rudin's projects in the 2010s have included lower-budget, independent films. In 2017 and 2018, Rudin and studio A24 released three films about adolescence by first-time writer/directors: Greta Gerwig's Lady Bird, Bo Burnham's Eighth Grade and Jonah Hill's Mid90s. In 2015, he signed a television production deal with Fox.

=== Sony Pictures email leak ===
On December 9, 2014, a major illegal breach of Sony's computer systems by "Guardians of Peace" hackers using Shamoon malware led to disclosure of many gigabytes of stolen information, including internal company documents. In subsequent news coverage SPE Co-Chair Amy Pascal and Scott Rudin were noted to have had an email exchange about Pascal's upcoming encounter with President Barack Obama that included characterizations described as racist. The two had suggested that upon meeting the president they should mention films about African Americans, such as Django Unchained, 12 Years a Slave, The Butler, and Amistad which all discuss slavery in the United States or the pre-civil rights era. In the email thread, Rudin added, "I bet he likes Kevin Hart."

Rudin later said that the e-mails were "private emails between friends and colleagues written in haste and without much thought or sensitivity." He added that he was "profoundly and deeply sorry".

=== Theater producer ===
Typically producing between two and five productions per year, Rudin was once described as one of Broadway's most prolific commercial producers.

His first Broadway play, David Henry Hwang's Face Value in 1993, was produced alongside Stuart Ostrow and Jujamcyn Theaters, and it closed after eight preview performances. He started a deal with Jujamcyn to develop and produce new plays for the theater chain. In 1994, Rudin won the Best Musical Tony Award for his production of Stephen Sondheim and James Lapine's Passion. The following year, he co-produced Kathleen Turner's Broadway comeback, Indiscretions, and Ralph Fiennes' New York stage debut in Hamlet. In 1996, Rudin produced the revival of the Stephen Sondheim and Larry Gelbart musical A Funny Thing Happened on the Way to the Forum, for which Nathan Lane won his first Tony Award. His subsequent productions and co-productions have included Skylight, The Goat or Who Is Sylvia?, Seven Guitars, The Ride Down Mt. Morgan, Copenhagen, Deuce, The History Boys, Beckett/Albee, Closer, The Blue Room, Doubt, Who's Afraid of Virginia Woolf?, The Year of Magical Thinking, A Behanding in Spokane, God of Carnage, The House of Blue Leaves, and Exit the King.

In 2010, Rudin and Carole Shorenstein Hays produced the first Broadway revival of August Wilson's Pulitzer Prize-winning play Fences, directed by Kenny Leon and starring Denzel Washington and Viola Davis. Fences garnered ten Tony Award nominations and three wins, including Best Revival of a Play, Best Actor for Washington, and Best Actress for Davis. He would later produce the 2016 film adaptation of Fences.

The following year, Rudin was a producer for the Broadway musical The Book of Mormon, which opened in March 2011 at the Eugene O'Neill Theatre. The show won nine Tony Awards including Best Musical and the Grammy Award for Best Musical Theatre Album. The production has played more than 3,740 Broadway performances as of March 15, 2020. The show has also played in London, Australia, Europe, Asia, and on tour across the United States.

Since 2011, Rudin has won Tony Awards for producing Arthur Miller's Death of a Salesman (directed by Mike Nichols and starring Philip Seymour Hoffman and Andrew Garfield), Lorraine Hansberry's A Raisin in the Sun (starring Denzel Washington), David Hare's Skylight (directed by Stephen Daldry and starring Carey Mulligan and Bill Nighy), Stephen Karam's The Humans, Ivo van Hove's staging of Arthur Miller's A View From The Bridge, and the record-breaking revival of Hello, Dolly! starring Bette Midler. Other notable productions include Larry David's Fish in the Dark, a hit comedy with more than $13.5 million in advance sales at the box office, a record at the time.

Rudin left the Pulitzer Prize-winning play Clybourne Park in February 2012, ahead of an April opening, due to a feud with writer Bruce Norris that was unrelated to the play.

In 2015, it was announced that Rudin would produce Groundhog Day, a musical adaptation of the 1993 film of the same title, originally starring Bill Murray. Tim Minchin wrote the music and lyrics, and screenwriter Danny Rubin wrote the book. Rudin withdrew from the production in June 2016, citing creative differences with the production team. Groundhog Day opened on Broadway in 2017 and was a financial failure, closing after just five months.

In 2013, after New York Times theater reporter Patrick Healy published an interview with Colm Toibin, the author of Rudin's financially unsuccessful The Testament of Mary, Rudin ran an advertisement in the Times, saying: "Let's give a big cuddly shout-out to Pat Healy, infant provocateur and amateur journalist at The New York Times. Keep it up, Pat -- one day perhaps you'll learn something about how Broadway works, and maybe even understand it."

In 2016, in a throwback to an earlier practice on Broadway, Rudin demanded that all critics attend the opening night performance of his production of The Front Page, which starred Nathan Lane, John Slattery, John Goodman, Holland Taylor, and Robert Morse. (Typically, critics are invited to several performances prior to opening night, giving them ample time to file reviews.) In a public dispute, The Hollywood Reporter critic David Rooney, who had a conflict on the date of the opening, balked at the change, adding: "You know nobody works at that pace anymore, right?" Rudin shot back: "Critics reviewed shows on Broadway this way for 100 years. You can do it for one night. Get over it." Rooney's rave review eventually ran two days later than other New York critics, on October 23.

==== To Kill a Mockingbird legal disputes ====
Rudin produced the first Broadway production of Harper Lee's To Kill a Mockingbird, newly adapted for the stage by Aaron Sorkin, directed by Bartlett Sher, and starring Jeff Daniels. The production opened to critical acclaim at the Shubert Theatre on December 13, 2018. During the week ending December 23, 2018, the production grossed more than $1.5 million, breaking the record for box-office grosses for a non-musical play in a theater owned by The Shubert Organization.

In March 2018, prior to the play's opening, the Harper Lee estate filed a lawsuit against the play's production company based on allegations that the play deviates too much from the novel. Sorkin had previously admitted that, "As far as Atticus and his virtue goes, this is a different take on Mockingbird than Harper Lee's or Horton Foote's. He becomes Atticus Finch by the end of the play, and while he's going along, he has a kind of running argument with Calpurnia, the housekeeper, which is a much bigger role in the play I just wrote. He is in denial about his neighbors and his friends and the world around him, that it is as racist as it is, that a Maycomb County jury could possibly put Tom Robinson in jail when it's so obvious what happened here. He becomes an apologist for these people." The following month, producer Rudin countersued for breach of contract. The legal dispute was settled by May 2018.

Prior to the run of Sorkin's adaptation, another version of the play by Christopher Sergel had been available for license for more than 50 years. Since the opening of Sorkin's adaptation, lawyers acting for Atticus Limited Liability Company (ALLC) – the company formed by Rudin for the Broadway production of To Kill a Mockingbird – claimed worldwide exclusivity for professional stage rights to any adaptation of Lee's book. The company has moved aggressively to shut down all other productions of To Kill a Mockingbird staged within 25 miles of any city ALLC determines to be a major metropolitan center that might eventually host the Sorkin adaptation – even though the companies had been legally granted rights by Dramatic Publishing Co. to produce the Sergel adaptation. One of the amateur companies, The Grand Theatre, estimated that the cancellation of Mockingbird would cost the theater some $20,000.

== Misconduct allegations ==
Rudin has been called "the most feared man in town" (The Hollywood Reporter), and notoriously hot-tempered. Rudin acknowledged having "a temper" in a 2008 interview, but said he had "grown up". Hugh Wilson admitted in a 2015 interview that he had negative experiences working with Rudin during the making of The First Wives Club.

On April 7, 2021, Rudin was accused, by numerous employees speaking to The Hollywood Reporter, of demonstrating a long-standing pattern of abusive behavior towards his employees, including physical abuse, such as throwing objects at his assistants, and in one instance breaking an assistant's hand with a computer monitor. In that article, he was also accused of having victims sign non-disparagement agreements and having the victims' film credits increased or retroactively decreased after quitting.

On April 14, 2021, KO announced that they would not return to Moulin Rouge! when it reopened in protest of the industry's silence on the allegations against Rudin. In an Instagram video, KO stated: "I want a theatre industry that matches my integrity." As a result of the allegations, Sutton Foster, who was slated to star alongside Hugh Jackman in Rudin's upcoming Broadway revival of The Music Man, vowed to leave the production if Rudin did not "take a seat". On April 17, 2021, the Actors' Equity Association called on Rudin to release employees from any ongoing nondisclosure agreements and for actions from employers, in order to create "truly safe and harassment-free theatrical workplaces on Broadway and beyond." Members of the union have pushed for Rudin to be added to a Do Not Work list.

On April 17, Rudin released a statement apologizing for "the pain my behavior caused to individuals, directly and indirectly" and said he would "step back" from active work on his Broadway productions. On April 20, he announced that he would do the same for his "film and streaming" projects. Rudin's business relationship with the studio A24 was terminated.

On August 13, it was reported that Rudin was no longer an executive producer for the upcoming third season of What We Do in the Shadows.

In a September 2021 interview with Vanity Fair, Aaron Sorkin was asked about Rudin being fired from To Kill a Mockingbird, after an 18-month hiatus due to the COVID-19 pandemic, and said, "I think Scott got what he deserves."

== Accolades ==
In 2008, two of Rudin's productions—the Coen brothers' No Country for Old Men, which was adapted from the Cormac McCarthy book of the same name, and Paul Thomas Anderson's There Will Be Blood, which was adapted from the Upton Sinclair novel, Oil!—were nominated for eight Oscars apiece at the 80th Academy Awards, including a Best Picture nod for each. The two films shared the distinction of being the most nominated movies at that year's Oscar ceremony. Ultimately, No Country for Old Men won the Best Picture prize, with Rudin accepting the award on stage.

Rudin earned Primetime Emmy award nominations for Little Gloria... Happy at Last and School of Rock, and won both Primetime and Daytime Emmys for He Makes Me Feel Like Dancin'. He won a Grammy award for The Book of Mormon.

At the 2011 Producers Guild of America (PGA) Awards, Rudin became the only person ever to be nominated twice in one year. He was nominated (along with Dana Brunetti, Ceán Chaffin and Michael De Luca) for producing the Facebook biographical film The Social Network and was also nominated (along with Joel and Ethan Coen) for their remake of the classic western True Grit (2010). That same year, the PGA also awarded Rudin the David O. Selznick Achievement Award in Motion Pictures which recognizes an individual's outstanding body of work in the field of motion picture production.

== Personal life ==
Scott Rudin is married to John Barlow, previous owner (until its shutdown on June 14, 2009) of the Broadway public relations firm Barlow-Hartman Public Relations. In 2019, Scott Rudin and John Barlow purchased a three-story Greek Revival-style house in New York's West Village neighborhood from Graydon Carter.

== Filmography ==
Rudin was a producer in all films unless otherwise noted.

=== Film ===
Producer

- I'm Dancing as Fast as I Can (1982)
- Reckless (1984)
- Mrs. Soffel (1984)
- Pacific Heights (1990)
- Regarding Henry (1991)
- Little Man Tate (1991)
- The Addams Family (1991)
- White Sands (1992)
- Jennifer 8 (1992)
- Life with Mikey (1993)
- The Firm (1993)
- Searching for Bobby Fischer (1993)
- Addams Family Values (1993)
- Sister Act 2: Back in the Habit (1993)
- Nobody's Fool (1994)
- Clueless (1995)
- Sabrina (1995)
- Mother (1996)
- The First Wives Club (1996)
- Ransom (1996)
- Marvin's Room (1996)
- In & Out (1997)
- Twilight (1998)
- The Truman Show (1998)
- A Civil Action (1998)
- Bringing Out the Dead (1999)
- Sleepy Hollow (1999)
- Angela's Ashes (1999)
- Wonder Boys (2000)
- Rules of Engagement (2000)
- Shaft (2000)
- Jordeys (2000)
- Zoolander (2001)
- The Royal Tenenbaums (2001)
- Iris (2001)
- Orange County (2002)
- Changing Lanes (2002)
- The Hours (2002)
- Marci X (2003)
- School of Rock (2003)
- The Stepford Wives (2004)
- The Manchurian Candidate (2004)
- The Village (2004)
- I Heart Huckabees (2004)
- Team America: World Police (2004)
- The Life Aquatic with Steve Zissou (2004)
- Freedomland (2006)
- Failure to Launch (2006)
- Notes on a Scandal (2006)
- No Country for Old Men (2007)
- The Darjeeling Limited (2007)
- Margot at the Wedding (2007)
- Stop-Loss (2008)
- Doubt (2008)
- Revolutionary Road (2008)
- Fantastic Mr. Fox (2009)
- It's Complicated (2009)
- Greenberg (2010)
- The Social Network (2010)
- True Grit (2010)
- Margaret (2011)
- The Girl with the Dragon Tattoo (2011)
- Extremely Loud & Incredibly Close (2011)
- The Dictator (2012)
- Moonrise Kingdom (2012)
- Frances Ha (2012)
- Inside Llewyn Davis (2013)
- Captain Phillips (2013)
- The Grand Budapest Hotel (2014)
- Rosewater (2014)
- While We're Young (2014)
- Top Five (2014)
- Mistress America (2015)
- Aloha (2015)
- Steve Jobs (2015)
- Zoolander 2 (2016)
- Fences (2016)
- The Meyerowitz Stories (2017)
- Lady Bird (2017)
- Eighth Grade (2018)
- Annihilation (2018)
- Isle of Dogs (2018)
- The Legacy of a Whitetail Deer Hunter (2018)
- Game Over, Man! (2018)
- 22 July (2018)
- Mid90s (2018)
- The Girl in the Spider's Web (2018)
- Uncut Gems (2019)
- The Woman in the Window (2021)

Executive producer

- Flatliners (1990)
- Sister Act (1992)
- I.Q. (1994)
- South Park: Bigger, Longer & Uncut (1999)
- Closer (2004)
- Lemony Snicket's A Series of Unfortunate Events (2004)
- Wild Tigers I Have Known (2006)
- Reprise (2006)
- Venus (2006)
- The Queen (2006)
- There Will Be Blood (2007)
- Towelhead (2007) (credited at Toronto premiere only)
- The Other Boleyn Girl (2008)
- Julie & Julia (2009)
- The Way Back (2010)
- Moneyball (2011)
- Inherent Vice (2014)
- Ex Machina (2014)
- First Cow (2019)

As casting director

Year	Film
1978	King of the Gypsies
1979	Last Embrace
1979	The Wanderers
1980	Simon
1980	Hide in Plain Sight
1980	Resurrection

As an actor

Year	Film	Role	Notes
2014	While We're Young	Party Guest	Uncredited

Other acknowledgement in credits

Year	Film	Role
2009	Away We Go	Special thanks
2010	Beginners	Special thanks
2013	Night Moves	Special thanks
2015	Louder Than Bombs	Thanks
2016	Certain Women	Special thanks
2019	Share	Special thanks

=== Television ===
Executive producer

- Little Gloria... Happy at Last (1982)
- Page Eight (2011) (TV movie)
- The Newsroom (2012–14)
- Aziz Ansari: Buried Alive (2013)
- Silicon Valley (2014)
- School of Rock (2016–18)
- Five Came Back (2017)
- What We Do in the Shadows (2019–21)
- My Favorite Shapes by Julio Torres (2019) (TV movie)
- Diagnosis (2019)
- First Wives Club (2019)
- Barkskins (2019)
- Dispatches from Elsewhere (2020)
- Devs (2020)
- Console Wars (2020)

Producer

- Revenge of the Stepford Wives (1980) (TV movie)
- Clueless (1996–99)
- The Corrections (2012) (pilot)
- Another Day, Another Time: Celebrating the Music of Inside Llewyn Davis (2013)

Miscellaneous crew

Year	Title	Role	Notes
1996	Passion	Stage producer	TV movie
2016	The Night Of	Consultant	

As casting director

Year	Title	Notes
1979	Sanctuary of Fear	TV movie
1980	The Lathe of Heaven	TV movie
