= National Dance Institute =

Coordinates: 40.82391°N 73.939488°W

National Dance Institute (NDI) was founded in 1976 by New York City Ballet principal dancer Jacques d'Amboise.

NDI works with mainstream, bilingual, and special education classes.

NDI classes are taught by professional artists, who work with 6,500 New York City school children each week throughout Manhattan, Brooklyn, and the Bronx. Most NDI dancers come from low-income communities, and all NDI programs are offered to children free of charge. Among NDI dancers, 32% are Latino, 24% Asian, 23% Caucasian, 19% African-American, and 2% other non-white minority groups.

In 2001, Carole Valleskey, formerly a principal dancer with the Joffrey Ballet, founded California Dance Institute as a West Coast affiliate of NDI. California Dance Institute teachers have all been trained in the rigorous NDI teaching methodology.

== Notable students ==
- Azealia Banks
- Timothée Chalamet
- Colby Minifie
- Nev Schulman

== See also ==
- National Dance Institute New Mexico
- Jacques d'Amboise (dancer)
