= National Dance Institute New Mexico =

- Formation: 1994
- Founder: Jacques d'Amboise, Catherine Oppenheimer
- Legal status: 501(c)(3)
- Purpose: Youth arts education
- Headquarters: Santa Fe, New Mexico
- Executive Director: Russell Baker
- Website: https://www.ndi-nm.org/

National Dance Institute New Mexico (NDI New Mexico) is a non-profit arts education organization, founded in 1994 by Jacques d'Amboise and Catherine Oppenheimer and based in Santa Fe, New Mexico. The organization, through both in-school and after school programs, employs the medium of dance to instill values and habits in its students that are meant to help them succeed in academics and everyday life. Fees for its after school programs operate on a sliding scale basis, with many students qualifying for free tuition based on parents' income. NDI New Mexico serves communities statewide, and reports that a majority of its participants are children from low income families and children of color.

In 2021, NDI New Mexico partnered with New Mexico PBS on VASTNESS, a short film that the two entities billed as "A Socially Distanced Dance Film for a Global Pandemic." The film featured more than 50 of NDI New Mexico's advanced students, who performed original choreography that was developed by staff and students.

Also in 2021, NDI New Mexico was voted by the readers of the Santa Fe Reporter as both "Best Dance Company" and "Best Youth Arts Program."
