= Medea, the Musical =

1994 American musical comedy

- Written by: John Fisher
- Original language: English
- Subject: LGBT culture Greek mythology Play within a play
- Genre: Musical comedy

Premiere
- Date premiered: 1994
- Place premiered: United States

Medea, the Musical is a 1994 musical comedy by American playwright John Fisher. The play, a farce, concerns a theater director's attempt to recast Medea, the ancient Greek tragedy by Euripides, as a serious modern commentary on LGBT culture, which goes humorously wrong when the director's cast and crew refuse to conform to the stereotyped roles he has created for them. The play became a long-running "cult favorite" in San Francisco in the mid-1990s before touring regionally. Not to be confused with Medea The Musical written by English actress and playwright Hayley Canham which premiered in Cambridge in 2022.

== Characters ==
- The "Auteur", or theater director, who has rewritten Medea and is now trying to rehearse and stage the play, portrayed in some productions by Fisher himself
- Paul, who plays Jason in the production, and while not acting is lead singer of a disco band, the Argonauts
- Elsa, who plays Medea
- Actors playing Phaedra, Hippolytus, Aphrodite, the King of Colchis, Eros, Apsyrtus, and other mythological figures from the Greek play
- The piano player and stage manager
- "The rocker", a young gay rock star
- Princess Tamalpa (a mythical Miwok Indian woman after whom Mount Tamalpais is named)

== Plot ==
The Auteur is rehearsing a production of the ancient Greek tragedy Medea, for the "Euripides festival". He has set the play as a serious commentary on contemporary gay issues.

Things start to go wrong when Paul (playing Jason, the hero of Medea), who has not been attracted to women since kindergarten, falls in love with leading lady Elsa (playing Medea, Jason's lover), a straight feminist. The two, disappointed with what they consider a sexist portrayal of Medea as a muse and victim of Jason's ambitions in both the original and the Auteur's retelling, conspire to rewrite the play to promote a feminist agenda. This upsets the Auteur, who is hostile to feminism, and "grosses out" the rest of the cast, each of whom has their own reason for resenting the pair's unlikely off-stage relationship.

On opening night the play falls completely apart, as the cast members revolt against the Auteur's direction. A theater critic from Time Magazine gives the play a glowing review, believing that the chaos was intentional. However, the audience of the play (as attributed by the actors to the real-life theater audience), knows that the play is a failure, both in performance and in its failure to present a coherent commentary on gay issues.

== Production history ==
=== Conception ===
John Fisher came out as gay at age 23, shortly after graduating with a drama degree from Berkeley. He returned for graduate school, where he wrote and directed plays while studying to be an academic scholar of theater. Dissatisfied with the plays of the time, which he felt depicted gays as unhappy, conflicted, and tragic, he decided to write plays that portrayed gays unapologetically.

Most of Fisher's work is gay-themed and includes a historically-based plot (often a retelling of an iconic tragic play or event), a large ensemble cast, an academic thesis as a sub-plot or theme, and elements of comedy, music, and farce. Before Medea, the Musical he wrote and directed Mary! (a musical take on Mary Stuart), Oresteia: The Musical, Cleopatra: the Musical, and Napoleon: The Camp-Drag-Disco-Musical Extravaganza (in which upon discovering that Joséphine de Beauharnais is actually a man, Napoleon decides he is gay and liberates Europe so that all gays can be free). Medea is (as of now) his most successful work.

=== Productions ===
The play was originally produced at UC Berkeley in 1994, when Fisher was a graduate student there, with a mostly volunteer cast of Fisher's school friends. It later moved to San Francisco, where it ran for fifteen months with the same cast members at a succession of ever-larger theaters. Most of the play's run was at the 565-seat Stage Door Theater, which later became the Ruby Skye nightclub.

The play was later produced in Los Angeles, California, and Seattle, Washington in 2000.

The play was widely expected to open on Broadway, but plans did not materialize. Fisher and others attribute the lack of interest to the play's being "too gay". Although many gay-themed plays did well on Broadway at the time, all of them (according to Fisher and commentators) allowed straight audience members and conservative gays to keep some distance from the gay themes.

In 2005 there was a revival production at Theater Rhinoceros in San Francisco.

=== Reception ===
The play was a surprise hit. Originally scheduled for a limited run the original production played fifteen months in San Francisco.

Critics generally (and approvingly) describe the play as self-consciously silly, campy, and "corny". The music was praised as "horrid" and "so absurdly bad it's funny". For example, the main characters fall in love while singing a duet from the musical, Oklahoma!, that the Auteur in his questionable esthetic judgment had decided to insert into the ancient tragedy. The play also features the actors singing versions of disco classics "I Will Survive" and "Y.M.C.A." with lyrics rewritten to reflect the play's plot elements, as well as Phaedra's courting her stepson Hippolytus to the tune of Barry Manilow's "Copacabana". One dance number evokes the choreography of Michael Jackson's video "Thriller".

Other critics describe the play as intelligent and profound, noting how most of the jokes and plot lines in the play draw parallels between modern sexual politics and Euripides' themes from the Greek version. For example, the straight Elsa seducing Paul away from his gay life mirrors the barbarian Medea seducing Jason from Greek civilization. Some note that the play spoofs itself, in a "so bad it's good" sort of way, lampooning amateur college productions (for example, the common custom of writing new lyrics for borrowed popular pop tunes) and the foibles of the cast, crew, reviewers, and audience who participate. More recent critics describe the play in retrospect as "dated", in part because of period-references to the 1970s, but also because gay farces and self-referential plays about plays became far more common in mainstream entertainment in the years after Medea's original production.

=== Awards ===
The play won six Critics Circle Awards (including Best Musical), the Will Glickman Play Writing Award, the BackstageWest Garland Award, the GLAAD Media Award, the Cable Car Award and the LA Weekly Award for "Best Musical".
