= Emile Ardolino =

American director and producer (1943–1993)

- Born: May 9, 1943; Queens, New York City, U.S.
- Died: November 20, 1993 (aged 50); Los Angeles, California, U.S.
- Resting place: St. John Cemetery, New York, U.S.
- Occupations: Television director; television producer; film director; film producer; actor
- Notable work: Dirty Dancing; Sister Act

Emile Ardolino (May 9, 1943 – November 20, 1993) was an American television and film director and producer, best known for his work on the films Dirty Dancing (1987) and Sister Act (1992). He won an Academy Award for Best Documentary Feature for his film He Makes Me Feel Like Dancin' (1983).

== Early life and career ==
Emile Ardolino was born in Maspeth, a neighborhood of Queens, the son of Italian immigrants Ester (nee Pesiri) and Emilio Ardolino.

He began his career as an actor in Off-Broadway productions, and then moved to the production side of the business. In 1967, he founded Compton-Ardolino Films with Gardner Compton. In the 1970s and 1980s, Ardolino worked for PBS. He profiled dancers and choreographers for their Dance in America and Live from Lincoln Center series.

Ardolino won an Academy Award for Best Documentary Feature for the 1983 film He Makes Me Feel Like Dancin' at the 56th Academy Awards. He found commercial success with the Academy Award-winning 1987 hit Dirty Dancing.

== Death ==
Ardolino died in California on November 20, 1993, of complications from AIDS. His last films, The Nutcracker (based on George Balanchine's New York City Ballet adaptation) and the television production of Gypsy starring Bette Midler, were released and shown posthumously. Ardolino is buried beside his parents at St. John Cemetery in New York.

== Personal life ==
Ardolino was openly gay.

== Awards ==
- 1969 Obie Award for the Broadway production of Oh! Calcutta!
- 19 Emmy Award nominations, winning three
- 1983 Academy Award for Best Documentary Feature for He Makes Me Feel Like Dancin'.

== Partial filmography ==
- He Makes Me Feel Like Dancin' (1983)
- Dirty Dancing (1987)
- Chances Are (1989)
- Three Men and a Little Lady (1990)
- Sister Act (1992)
- The Nutcracker (1993)
- Gypsy (1993, TV movie)
