= Jacques d'Amboise (dancer) =

American dancer and choreographer (1934–2021)

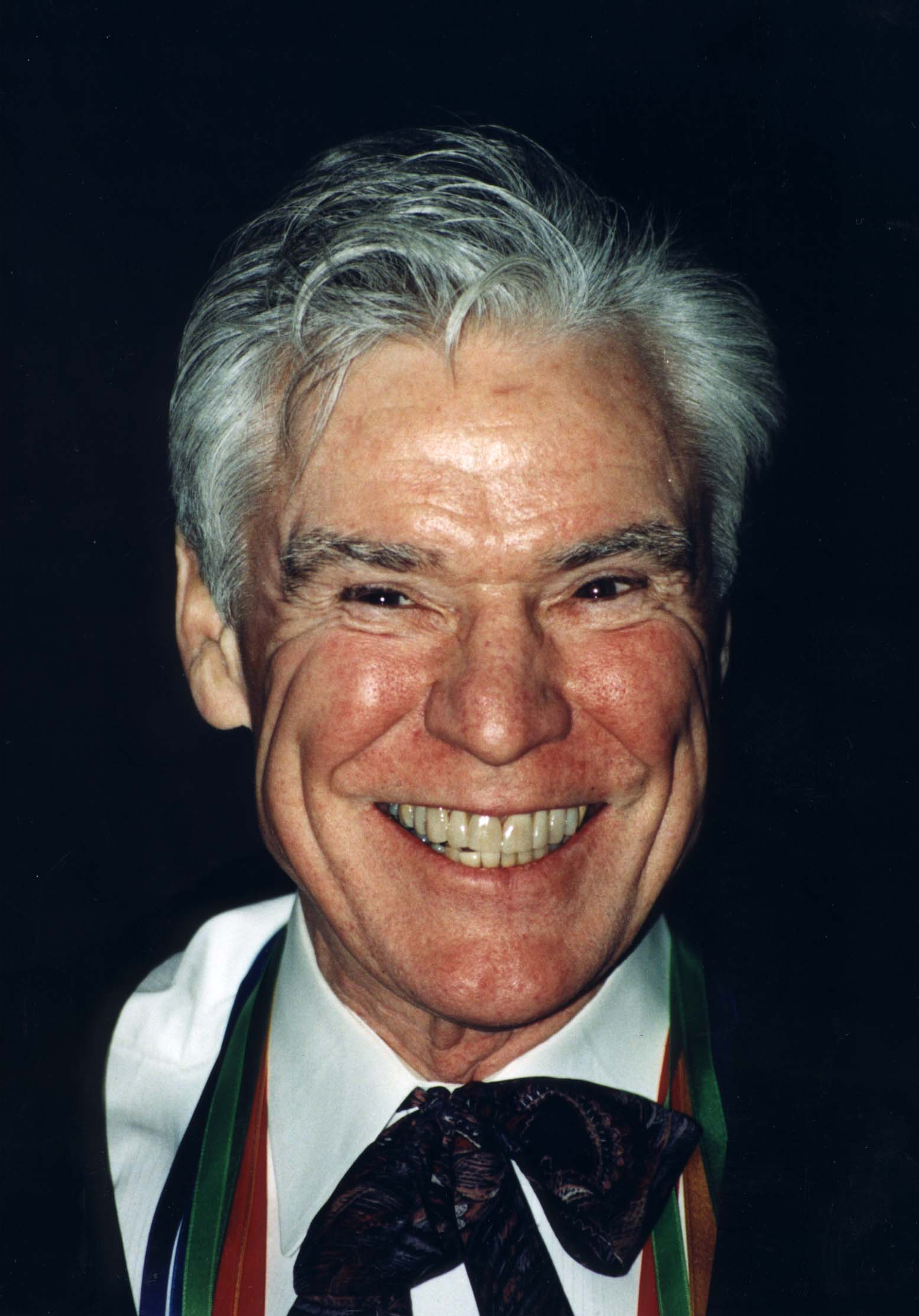
- d'Amboise in 2000
- Born: Joseph Jacques Ahearn; July 28, 1934; Dedham, Massachusetts, U.S.
- Died: May 2, 2021 (aged 86); Manhattan, New York, U.S.
- Education: School of American Ballet
- Occupations: Ballet dancer; choreographer; educator
- Years active: 1949–2021
- Organization(s): New York City Ballet; National Dance Institute
- Spouse: Carolyn George (m. 1956; died 2009)
- Children: 4, including Christopher and Charlotte

Jacques d'Amboise (born Joseph Jacques Ahearn; July 28, 1934 – May 2, 2021) was an American ballet dancer, choreographer, and educator. He joined the New York City Ballet in 1949 and was named principal dancer in 1953, and throughout his time with the company he danced 24 roles for George Balanchine. He also made film appearances, including Seven Brides for Seven Brothers and Carousel. He choreographed 17 ballets for the New York City Ballet and retired from performing in 1984.

D'Amboise founded the National Dance Institute in 1976 to promote dance to children. His work with the institute was featured in the documentary, He Makes Me Feel Like Dancin', which won an Academy Award and a Primetime Emmy Award. He received the MacArthur Fellowship in 1990, the Kennedy Center Honors in 1995, and the National Medal of Arts in 1998.

External videos
- Jacques d'Amboise rehearsing with Tanaquil Le Clercq (New York City Ballet) on PBS's American Master's in: Jerome Robbins' Afternoon of a Faun in 1953

== Early life and training ==
Joseph Jacques Ahearn was born on July 28, 1934, in Dedham, Massachusetts, to an Irish American father, Andrew Ahearn, and a mother of French Canadian descent, Georgette D'Amboise. He was one of four children. His father worked as a personal telegraph operator to Joseph P. Kennedy Sr. The family later moved to Washington Heights, Manhattan, New York. His father became an elevator operator at the Columbia Presbyterian Hospital.

At age seven, d'Amboise was sent to his sister's ballet class, and within six months he entered George Balanchine's School of American Ballet. In 1946 his mother managed to convince the family to change their surname from Ahearn to hers, d'Amboise, as "it's aristocratic, it's French...and it's a better name". Thus his name was legally changed to Joseph Jacques d'Amboise. The same year he started performing child roles with Ballet Society. He left high school at age fifteen when he joined the New York City Ballet.

== Career ==
In 1949, 15-year-old d'Amboise was recruited to the New York City Ballet. Soon he was cast in lead roles, including the lead in Lew Christensen's Filling Station. In 1953 he was promoted to principal dancer. Balanchine created 24 roles for him, including Western Symphony (1954), Stars and Stripes (1958), Episodes (1959), Movements for Piano and Orchestra (1963), Jewels (1967), Who Cares (1970), Robert Schumann's Davidsbündlertänze (1980), as well the New York City Ballet 1957 revival of Balanchine's Apollo, in which d'Amboise danced the titular role. He also choreographed 17 ballets for the company.

Outside of the New York City Ballet, d'Amboise had also appeared in films. In 1954 he played Ephraim in Stanley Donen's film, Seven Brides for Seven Brothers, after Donen spotted d'Amboise in a performance of Filling Station. In 1956 he appeared in two films, Carousel as Starlight Carnival barker and The Best Things in Life Are Free. In 1957 he performed in the Broadway musical Shinbone Alley.

In 1976 he founded the National Dance Institute to promote dance to children. At first the group only had 30 boys. As of 2021 the program had reached 2 million children. In 1978 he was named dean of dance at State University of New York at Purchase. D'Amboise was the subject of Emile Ardolino's documentary, He Makes Me Feel Like Dancin', which followed his works with the National Dance Institute. The film won the Academy Award for Best Documentary Feature in 1983 and the Primetime Emmy Award for Outstanding Children's Program in 1984.

External videos
- Jacques d'Amboise with Suzanne Farrell on USA DANCE: New York City Ballet (1965) performing George Balanchine's "Meditation" on archive.org

He retired from the New York City Ballet in 1984, shortly before he turned 50. He later stated he decided to retire as there were few roles he could dance at that age. He then shifted his focus to the National Dance Institute. In 1986 he appeared in the Disney film, Off Beat, with his character teaching dance to New York City police.

In 1994, he co-founded the National Dance Institute New Mexico (NDI New Mexico) with Catherine Oppenheimer.

== Awards and honors ==
Honors d'Amboise received include the MacArthur Fellowship in 1990, the Kennedy Center Honors in 1995, the National Medal of Arts in 1998, and the Fred and Adele Astaire Awards in 2011. He also received the Heinz Award, the New York Governor's Award, and honorary doctorate degrees from Boston College and Montclair State University.

== Personal life ==
In 1956 d'Amboise married Carolyn George, a New York City Ballet dancer and later a photographer. They had four children, including Christopher, a dancer and choreographer, and Charlotte, also a dancer and actress. Carolyn George died in 2009.

== Death ==
D'Amboise died at his home in Manhattan on May 2, 2021, following complications from a stroke at the age of 86.
